= Nissan Pulsar =

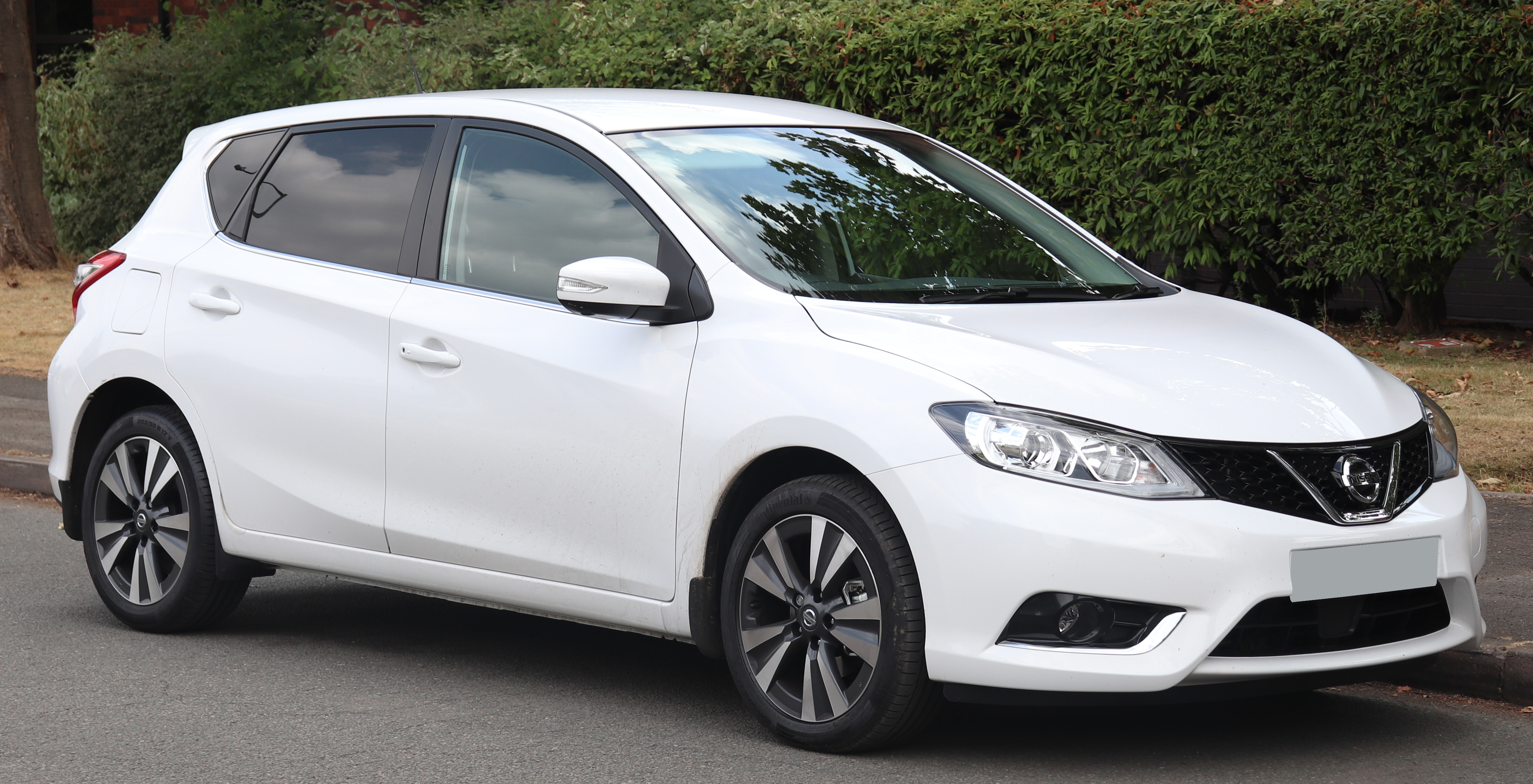
- 2018 Nissan Pulsar (C13)

Overview
- Manufacturer: Nissan
- Production: 1978–2005; 2014–2018; 2016–2026 (China)

Body and chassis
- Class: Subcompact car (1978–1995); Compact car (1995–2005, 2014–2018)

Chronology
- Predecessor: Nissan Cherry
- Successor: Nissan AD/Wingroad (station wagon); Nissan Bluebird Sylphy; Nissan Tiida

The Nissan Pulsar (Japanese: 日産・パルサー, Hepburn: Nissan Parusā) is a line of automobiles produced by the Japanese automaker Nissan from 1978 until 2000, when it was replaced by the Nissan Bluebird Sylphy in the Japanese market.

Between 2000 and 2005, the name "Pulsar" has been used in Australia and New Zealand on rebadged versions of the Sylphy. This arrangement continued until the introduction of the Nissan Tiida (C11) in 2005; at this time the Pulsar name was retired. In 2013, Nissan replaced the Tiida in Australia and New Zealand with two new models badged as Pulsar. These were based on the Sylphy (B17) sedan and Tiida (C12) hatchback, the latter also sold in Thailand under the Pulsar name. In 2014, a European-only replacement for the Tiida was introduced using the Pulsar nameplate.

The original Pulsar was a hatchback to be sold exclusively at a different Nissan Japan dealership network called Nissan Cherry Store as a four-door fastback sedan which replaced the Nissan Cherry; three-door and coupé variants followed three months after the introduction. Although Pulsar models were front-wheel drive from introduction, Nissan did offer four-wheel drive as an option on select models from 1986 on.

The Pulsar sold in Japan originally served as the entry model at Nissan dealerships Nissan Cherry Store, occupying the Cherry's erstwhile slot beneath the Nissan Violet. Meanwhile, other Pulsar derivatives served as the base model at other Japanese Nissan sales networks. Various Pulsar-based models were exported as international market conditions dictated, sometimes labeled as "Sunny", "Cherry", or "Sentra", even though they were not the same as the Japanese market Sunny or Cherry.

The name "Pulsar" is taken from pulsar (portmanteau of pulsating star), a highly magnetized, rotating neutron star.

== N10, N11 (1978) ==
N10, N11
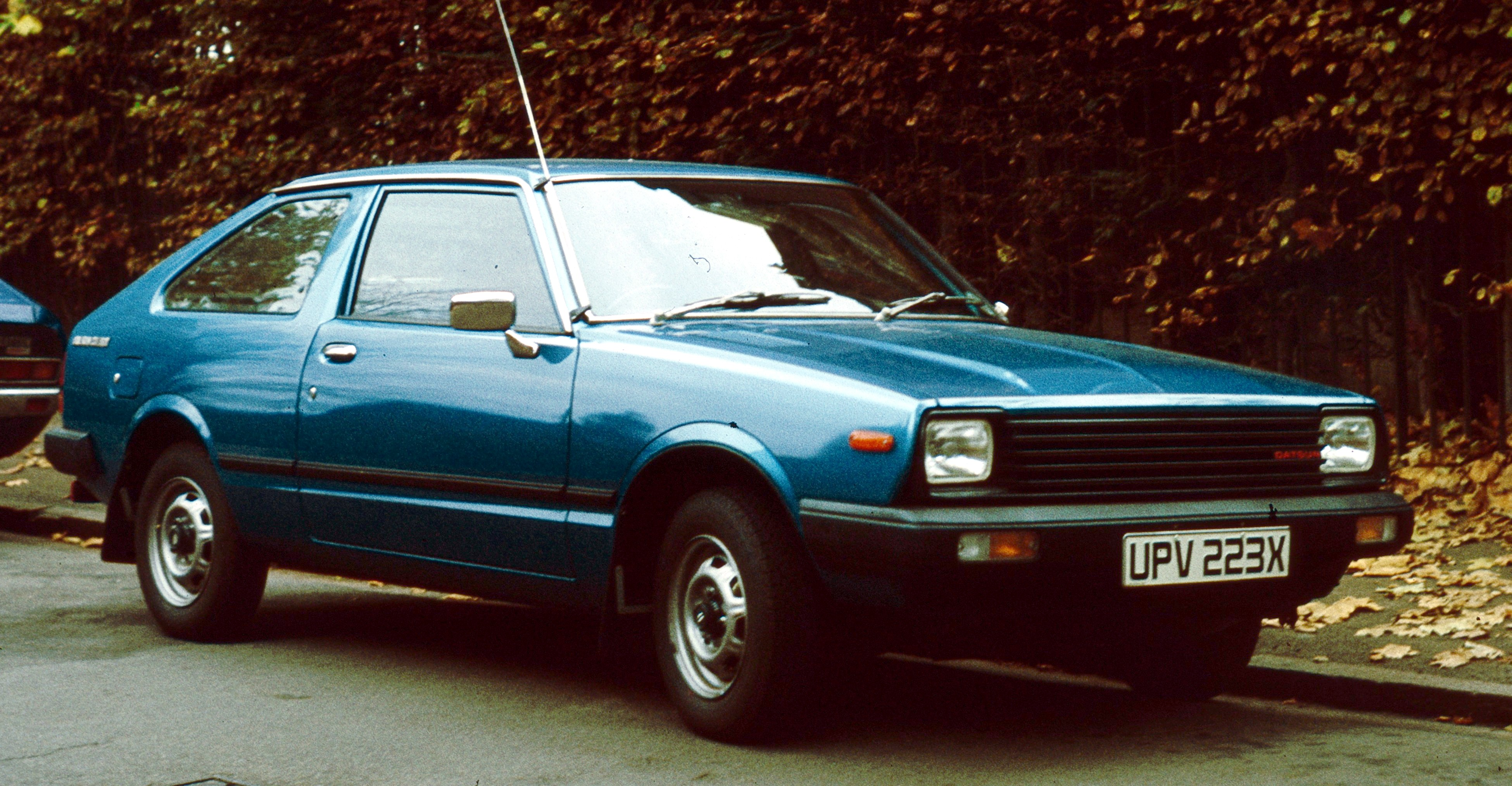

Overview
- Also called: Datsun 100A/120A/130A/140A/150A; Datsun 310 (US); Datsun Cherry (Europe); Datsun Pulsar; Nissan Langley
- Production: May 1978 – April 1982
- Assembly: Japan: Oppama Plant, Yokosuka, Kanagawa; Greece: Volos (TEOKAR); Malaysia: Kuala Lumpur (Tan Chong); New Zealand: Wiri; South Africa: Rosslyn, Gauteng (NSA)

Body and chassis
- Body style: 3/5-door hatchback; 3-door liftback coupé; 4-door fastback sedan; 5-door station wagon/van; 3-door panel van
- Layout: Transverse front-engine, front-wheel-drive

Powertrain
- Engine: 988 cc A10 I4 (BN10); 988 cc E10 I4 (SN10); 1171 cc A12 I4 (N10/N11); 1237 cc A12A I4 (YN10); 1270 cc E13 I4 (UN10); 1397 cc A14 I4 (HN10/HN11); 1488 cc A15 I4 (Datsun 310); 1488 cc E15 I4 (MN10)

Dimensions
- Wheelbase: 2,395 mm (94.3 in)
- Length: 3,890–3,940 mm (153.1–155.1 in)
- Width: 1,620 mm (63.8 in)
- Height: 1,360 mm (53.5 in)
- Curb weight: 840 kg (1,852 lb)

The N10 model Pulsar, introduced in May 1978, replaced the earlier Cherry F-II. It benefited from the engineering efforts of the Prince Motor Company, which developed the original Nissan Cherry before the company merged with Nissan in 1966. It retained the rack-and-pinion steering of the Cherry, as well as the independent suspension with coilover struts in front and coil sprung trailing arms at the rear. The Pulsar was a subcompact car to augment the Sunny sedan. The Sunny and the Pulsar ranges were sold at different Nissan Japan dealerships, called Nissan Satio Shop for the Sunny, and Nissan Cherry Shop for the Pulsar.

It retained the Cherry name in Europe and many other export markets, even being sold as the "Cherry Europe" in some markets such as Belgium to separate it from the Cherry F-II which remained on sale for a while. The "Cherry"-badged version was first introduced at the Dutch AutoRAI show in February 1979 and went on sale shortly thereafter. An unusual styling feature for the car was its long nose, which was due to Nissan envisaging that the car would also be built with a longitudinal rear-wheel-drive layout for developing markets; however, only front-wheel-drive models were actually built. At the time of introduction, the Pulsar only had a four-door fastback-styled sedan bodywork, and either a 1.2- or a 1.4-liter engine. The three-door and coupé hatchbacks arrived in September 1978. Many export markets also offered a 1.0-liter (A10) option, with 45 PS (33 kW) while the 1.2-liter A12 offered 52 PS (38 kW). This was the first passenger car Nissan assembled in their new Greek plant, where local partner TEOKAR built it with the 1.0 and 1.2-liter engines from 1980 on.

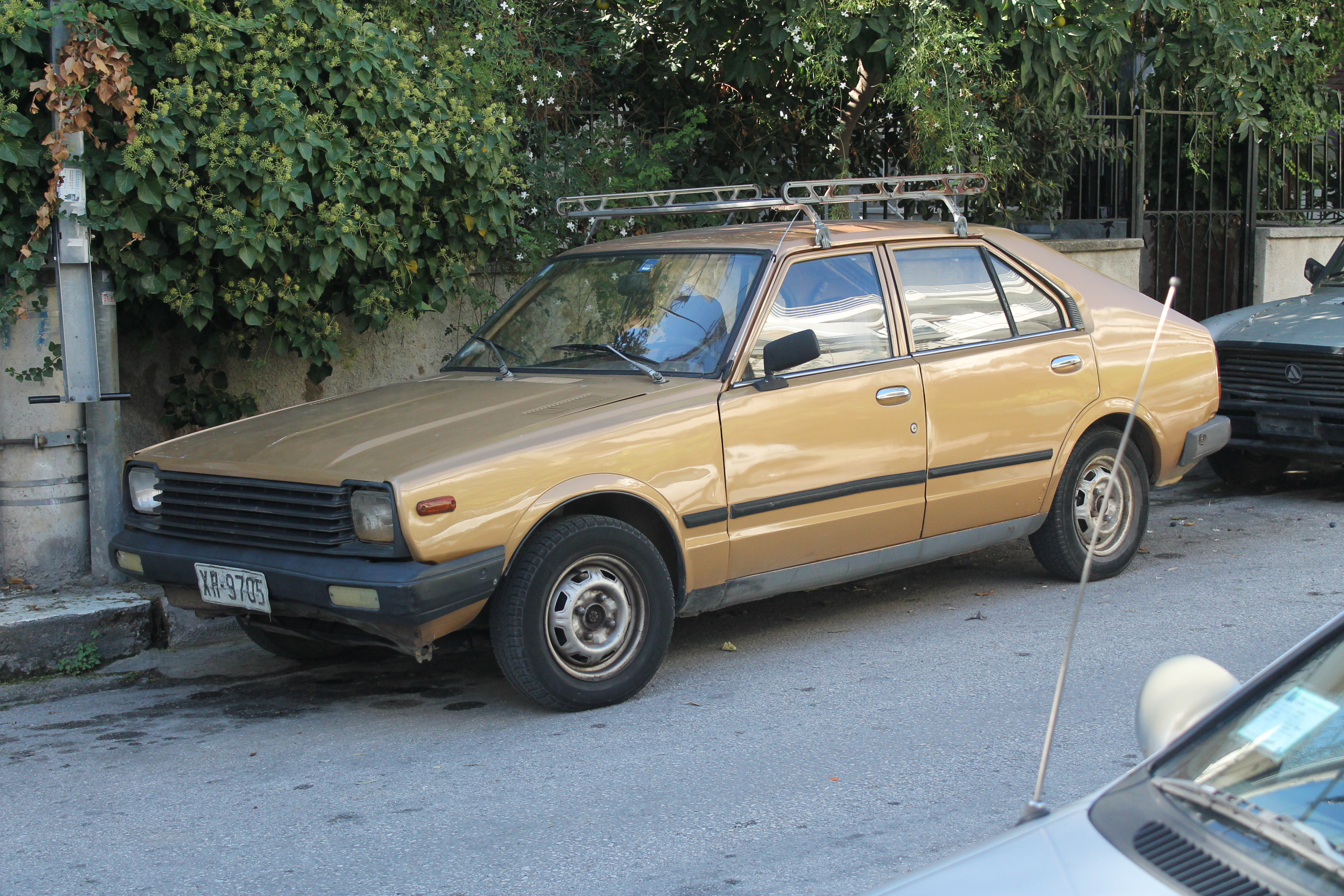
1981-1982 Datsun Cherry DX 5-door (Greece)

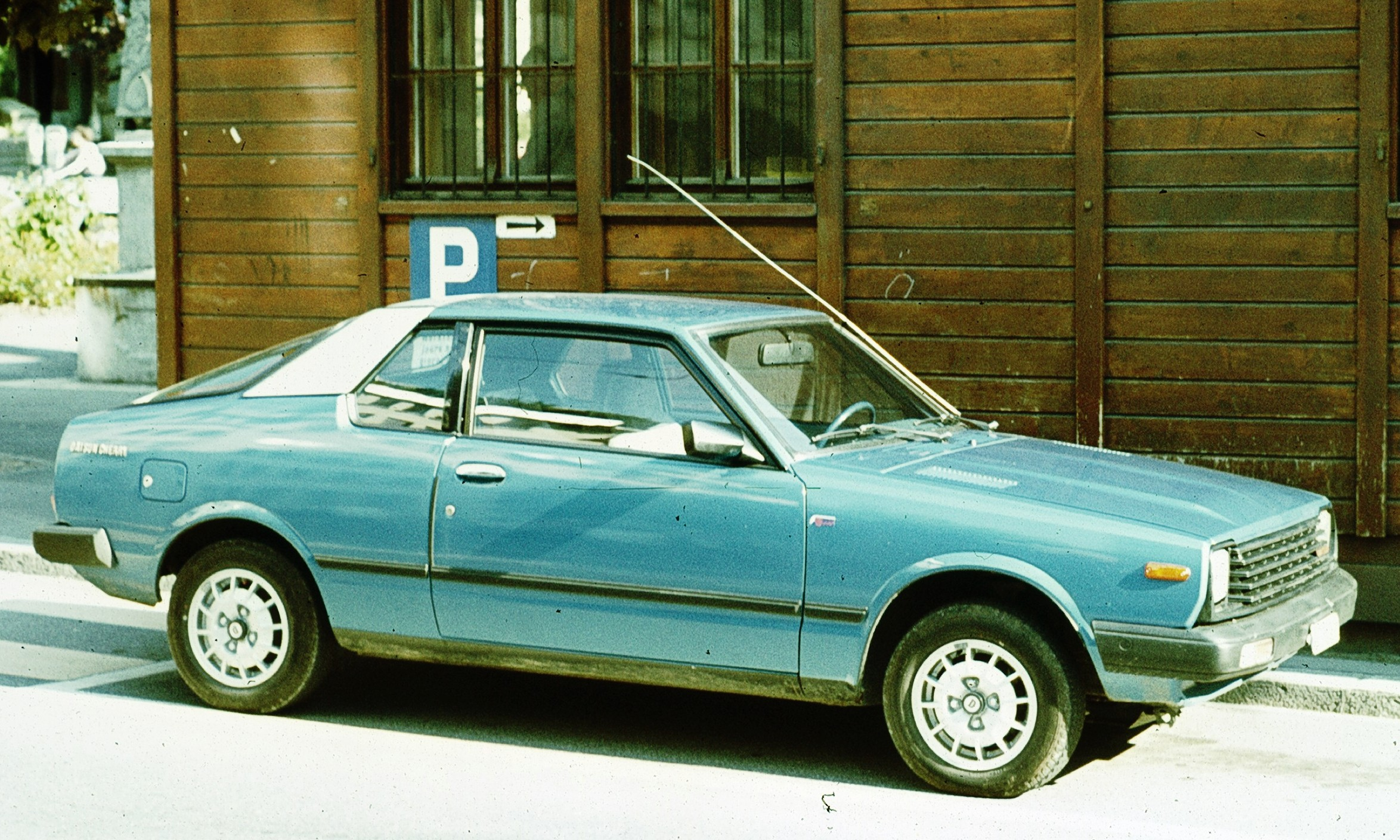
1981–1982 Datsun Cherry coupé (Europe)

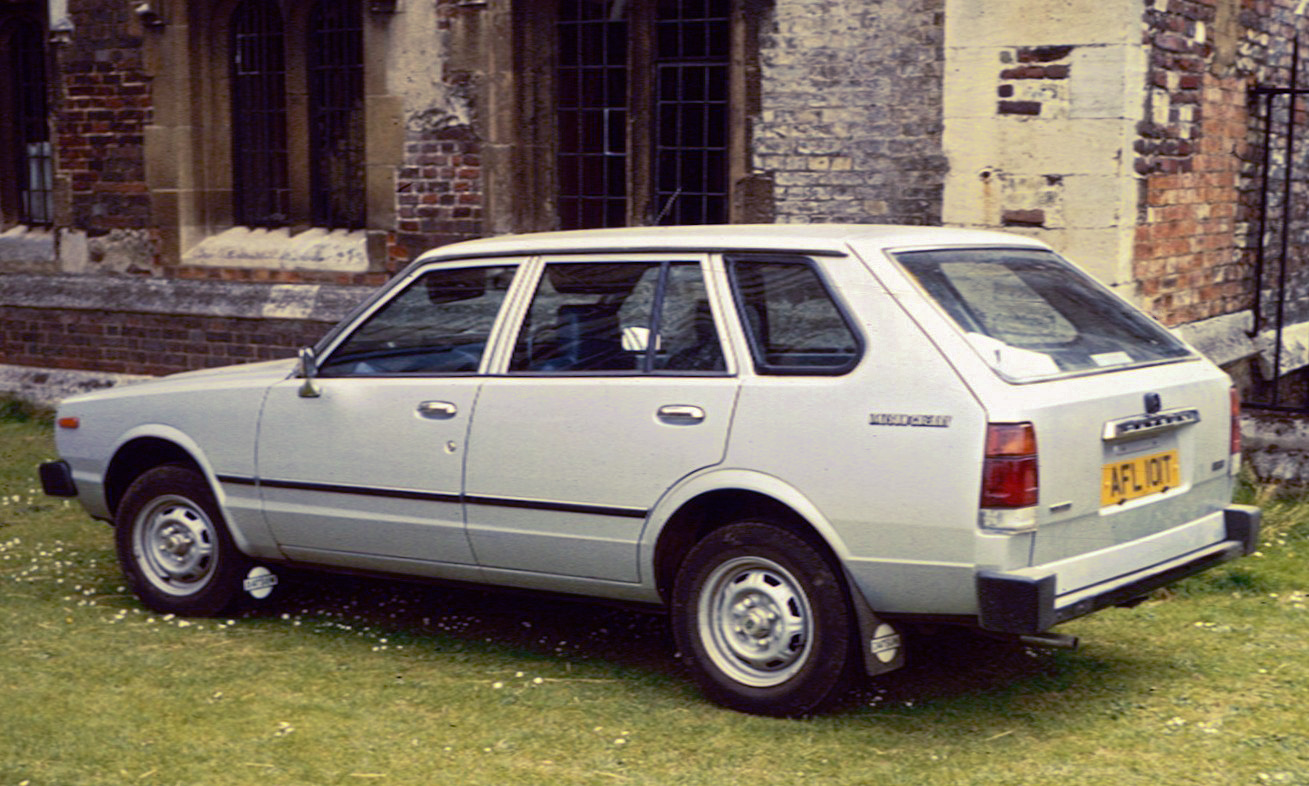
1979 Datsun Cherry wagon (Europe)

This model was known as the Datsun Cherry or Datsun 100A/120A/130A/140A/150A in Europe and most of Asia, and the Datsun 310 in the US and Canada. It was exported to Australia, New Zealand, South Africa, and Malaysia with the Datsun Pulsar name. It entered the Australian market in October 1980, with the facelift arriving in October 1981. In New Zealand the facelift model was locally assembled from late 1981, effectively replacing the previous generation 100A which was built and sold locally in the mid-1970s. The Datsun Pulsar was also locally assembled in South Africa and in Malaysia by Tan Chong Motor. Some late South African Pulsars use the square Skyline-style head- and taillights from the Langley, including on the well-equipped Pulsar Panache model.

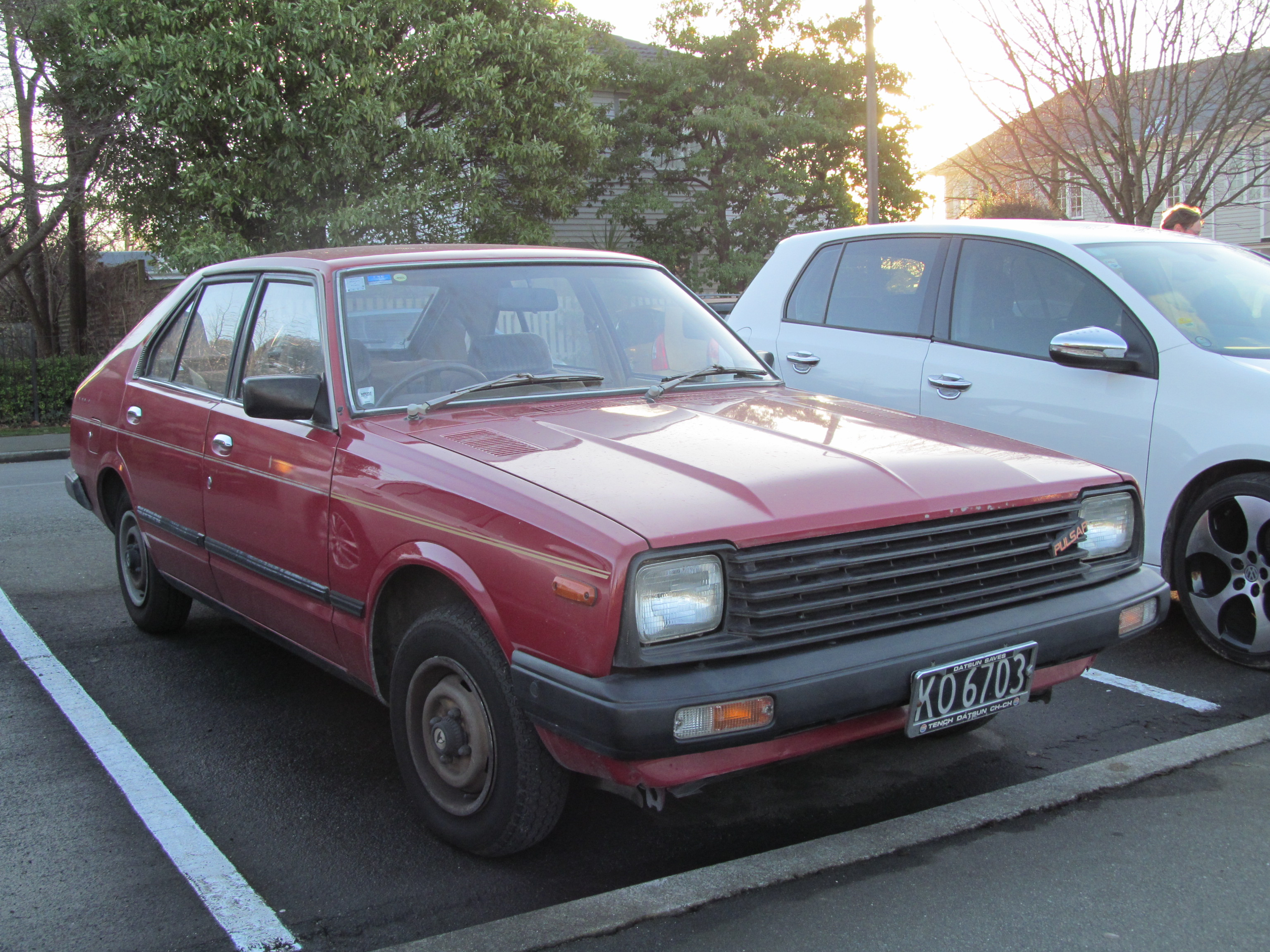
1981-1982 Datsun Pulsar TL 5-door (New Zealand)

Another Pulsar derivative was introduced to Japan, called the Nissan Langley, from 1980, and was introduced as a "mini Skyline", and exclusive to Nissan Prince Shop. The Japanese-market Langley assumed duties of the first generation, Sunny-based coupe called the Nissan Silvia when the second generation Silvia was upgraded to the larger Nissan Violet platform; both the Silvia and the Langley remained exclusive to Nissan Prince Store locations. The Langley was given its name from Samuel Pierpont Langley the inventor of the bolometer, a device used to measure electromagnetic radiation from the Sun, and was well regarded for his work in solar physics. Because of its sporting intentions, the Langley was equipped with an independent suspension at all four wheels, using MacPherson struts in the front, and a trailing arm coil suspension for the rear. The engine choices consisted of the A14 and E15 series engines with multi-point fuel injection on top level trim packages, but only in a three-door hatchback.

The N10 series Pulsar was available as a three- or five-door hatchback, a short-lived four-door fastback sedan, a five-door van or station wagon, and a three-door fastback-styled coupé with a wraparound rear window introduced at the end of 1978. The van was first released in November 1978, while the export-only wagon models first appeared in early 1979. Originally the lineup consisted only of the four-door sedan which utilized the same body profile as the later hatchback models; in August 1978 the coupé and three-door hatchback models were added, along with a fuel injected version of the 1.4-liter engine. One year later a five-door hatchback appeared, replacing the four-door sedan which was discontinued in May 1980, when the lineup was facelifted.

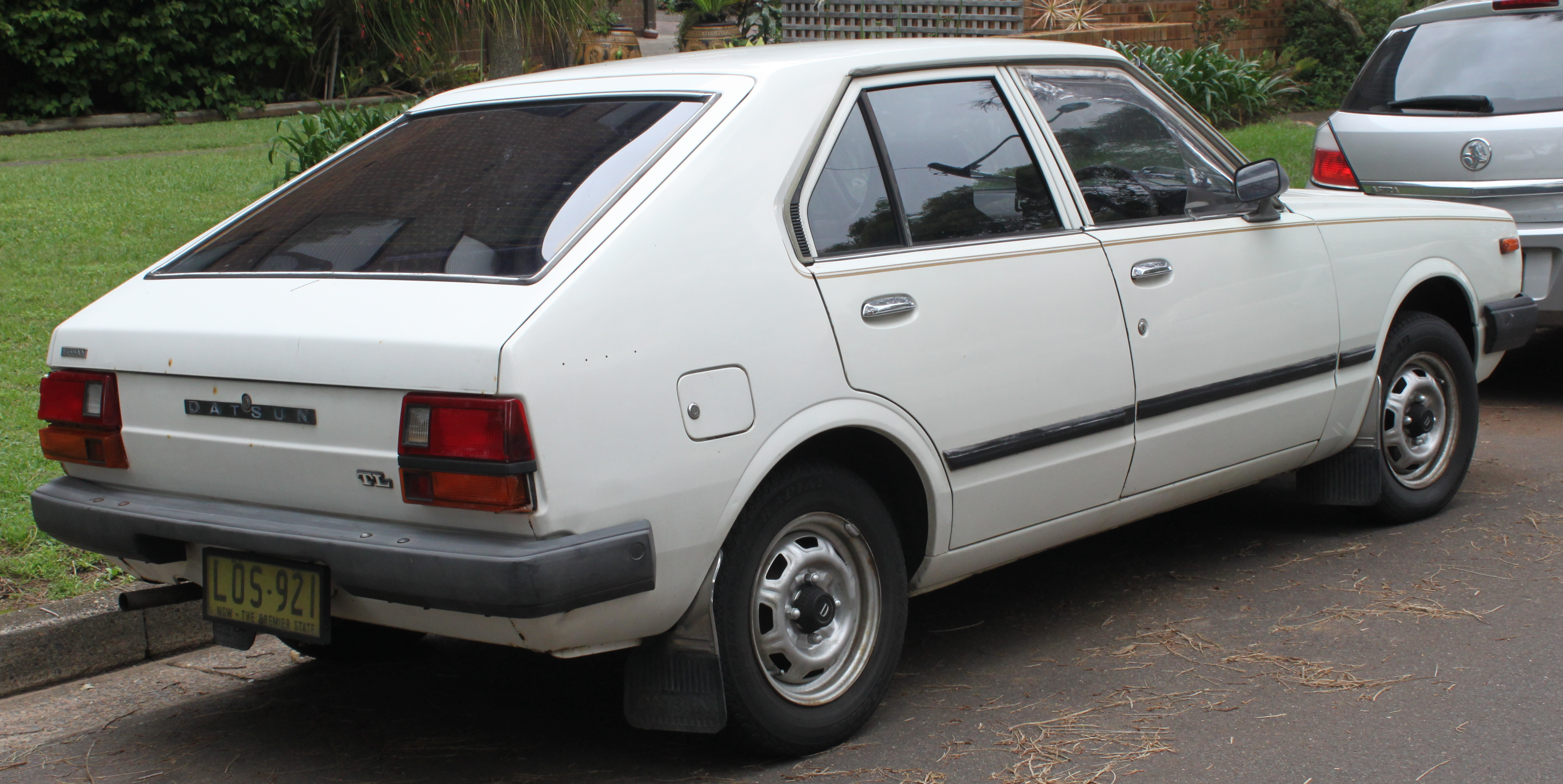
1981-1982 Datsun Pulsar TL 5-door (Australia)

Most markets outside Japan did not receive all versions: for instance, the three- and five-door hatchbacks and the coupé were the only models to be offered in the US. Most markets never got any fuel injected versions. The 1.0-liter A10 (later also updated to an OHC engine, called E10) was never available in Japan, mainly restricted to markets where tax codes made smaller engines necessary. An interesting anomaly of the French automotive taxation system is that while the A12A-engined Cherry sedans were considered as "6 CVs", the coupés with the same engine were markedly cheaper to own as they were classified as "5 CVs". An unusual feature at the time of introduction was the split folding rear seat fitted to better equipped models, increasing versatility.

A late-term facelift in March 1981 brought Nissan's newly developed OHC E-series engines in for the last twelve months of production, which also introduced the more conventional (and industry standard) drivetrain with an end-on transmission with unequal length driveshafts - the A-Series engine cars continued to use the transmission-in-sump layout that had been used in the previous generation Cherry models. The facelift involved a new grille and rectangular headlamps. The updated 1982 model Pulsar five-door hatchback with E-series engine was assembled in New Zealand at Nissan's new factory-owned assembly plant in Wiri, Auckland. Only one well-equipped model was offered, with a five-speed manual gearbox.

In 1982 "Nissan" badges began to appear on the cars, due to Nissan phasing out the Datsun name at that time for its international markets. Production of the N10 series ceased in mid-1982, to be replaced by the all-new N12 Cherry/Pulsar.

In Japan the five-door van received the VN10 chassis code when shown in November 1978, but was then re-released in August 1979 in a version which met the 1979 commercial vehicle emissions standards — this model was designated VN11. While domestic market passenger models only received the slightly larger A12A engine, the vans and many export markets retained the smaller A12 engine (and the option of the larger A14) as also used in the preceding Cherry F-II. The van was unusual in the Japanese market for the period in being front-wheel drive; Nissan made the most of this and gave it a special rear suspension to allow for a very low loading floor. To further lower the rear opening the rear bumper was also extremely slim. This generation Pulsar van also provided the basis for the first generation of the Prairie people carrier. The van's bodywork, with more comfortable fittings, was also used for the wagon model as sold in export markets. After the March 1981 facelift, the van also received the updated E13 and E15 OHC engines and now carried the VUN10 and VMN10 chassis codes. The three-door panel van model seems to have only been sold in the export.

=== Datsun 310 ===
In North America the N10 Pulsar was originally sold only with the largest, 1.4-liter engine and only with four- or five-speed manual transmissions. Called the Datsun 310, in Canada it was also available with Pulsar striping on the rear quarters. Equipment levels were Deluxe or GX, and originally only the three-door hatchback or hatchback coupé bodywork were available. Only the three-door (called a "two-door sedan hatchback" in period materials) was ever available in Deluxe trim, with the GX being optional and all other bodystyles only sold in GX trim. A four-speed manual was installed in all sedans, while the GX Coupé received a five-speed unit. The three-door GX was unusual in receiving manual, remotely controlled (from the center console, behind the parking brake) rear side windows. A five-door hatchback ("sedan hatchback") model was added to the line during the 1980 model year, only in GX trim.

For 1981 the Pulsar received a facelift in North America, with a sloping, horizontal bar grille and rectangular headlights in place of the previous round units. A larger 1.5-liter engine replaced the earlier 1.4-liter unit, although in desmogged form it only produced 65 hp (48 kW). This was still a pushrod unit (unlike the new E-series which was on its way into the Pulsar in the rest of the world), with a two-barrel carburetor and a catalytic converter. The 310 never stood a great chance in North America, where the cheaper and somewhat larger rear-wheel-drive 210-series always outsold it. The lack of an automatic option was a further hindrance in the US market.

== N12 (1982) ==
N12
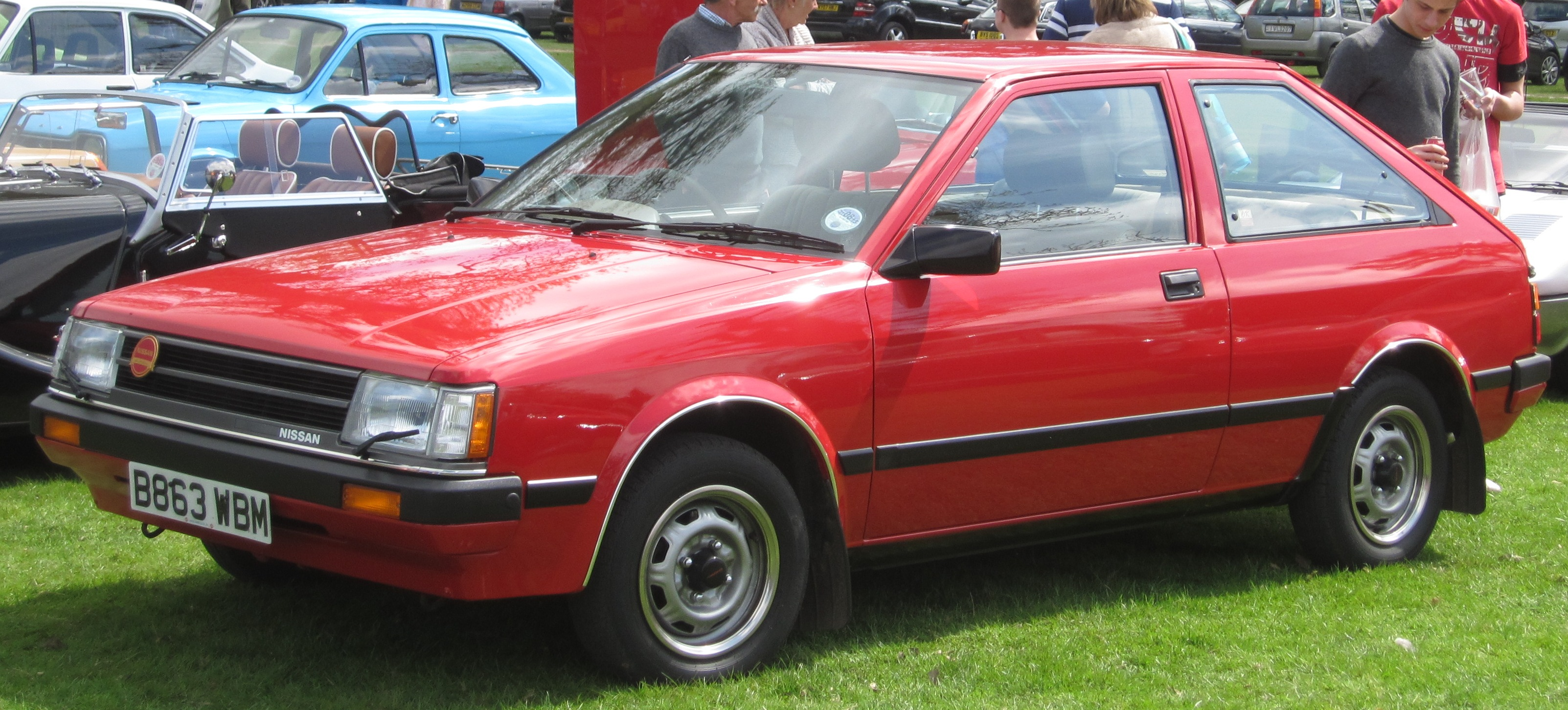
- Nissan Cherry 3-door (Europe)

Overview
- Also called: Nissan Cherry (Europe); Nissan Langley; Nissan Liberta Villa; Alfa Romeo Arna (Europe); Holden Astra (LB/LC)
- Production: 1982–1986; 1983–1987 (Australia)
- Assembly: Japan: Oppama Plant, Yokosuka, Kanagawa; Australia: Clayton South, Victoria; New Zealand: Wiri; Italy: Pratola Serra; South Africa: Rosslyn, Gauteng (NSA)

Body and chassis
- Body style: 2-door coupé (Nissan Pulsar EXA); 3/5-door hatchback 4-door sedan
- Layout: Front-engine, front-wheel-drive
- Related: Nissan Pulsar EXA (N12)

Powertrain
- Engine: 988 cc E10 I4 (BN12); 1270 cc E13 I4 (HN12); 1488 cc E15 I4 (PN12); 1488 cc E15ET turbo I4 (PN12); 1597 cc E16 I4; 1680 cc CD17 diesel I4 (SN12)

Dimensions
- Wheelbase: 2,415 mm (95.1 in)
- Length: 3,960 mm (155.9 in)
- Width: 1,620 mm (63.8 in)
- Height: 1,390 mm (54.7 in)
- Curb weight: 820 kg (1,808 lb)

A more angular version was announced in April 1982, making its European debut in October. By this time, Nissan had more or less standardised its naming policy worldwide, so as a Nissan it tended, except in European markets, to be known as the Pulsar. In Europe it retained the "Cherry" moniker, and in Malaysia it was sold as the Nissan Langley. In South Africa the hatchbacks kept the Pulsar name for this generation, but the sedans were sold with Langley badging. This generation Pulsar hatchback, three-door and five-door, was sold in North America only for model year 1983. The US-market Pulsar hatchbacks were equipped with the same, 1.6-litre E16S engine as the Pulsar NX coupé, producing 69 hp (51 kW; 70 PS) at 5,200 rpm. The engine was equipped with a two-barrel carburetor and an oxidizing catalytic converter - California market cars received a three-way catalytic converter with no change to power or torque figures. A five-speed manual or a three-speed automatic were available in the United States.

Some unusual options were carried over from the previous generation, such as having the rear locks (on four-door models) remote operated by cable from the front seat. The rear child locks could also be controlled with a slider mounted beneath the driver's seat.

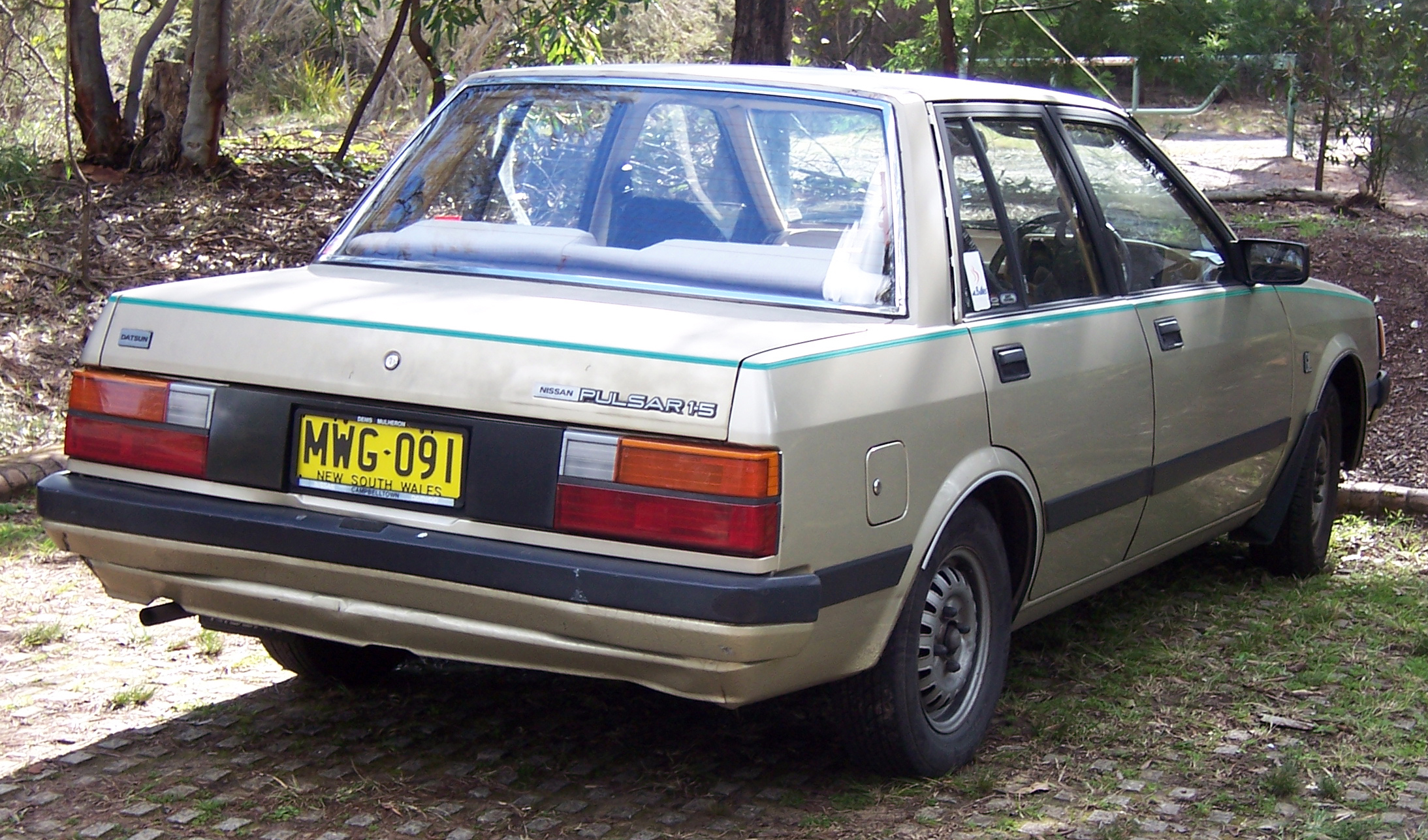
1983–1984 Nissan Pulsar GL sedan (Australia)

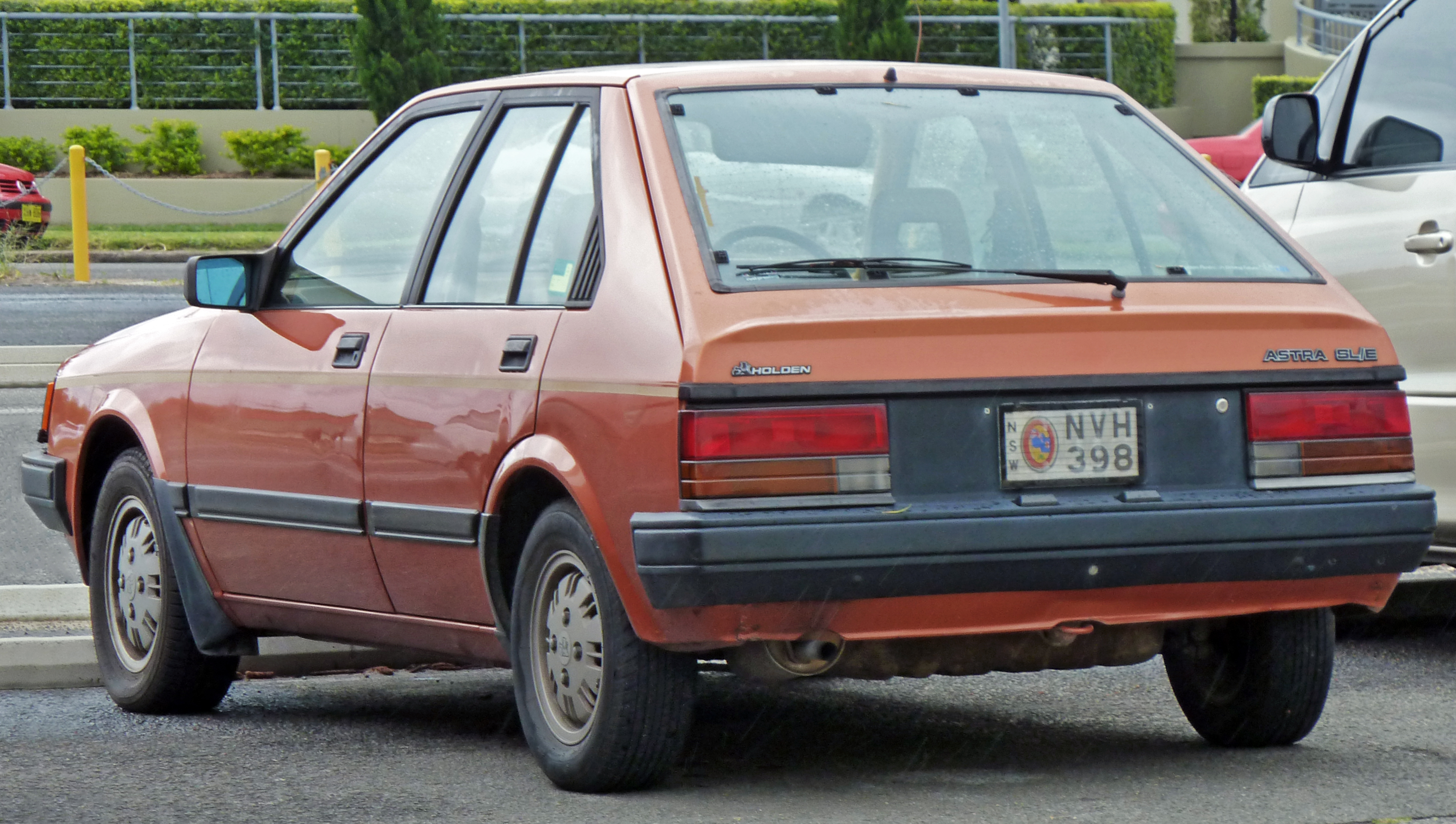
Holden Astra (LB/LC) 5-door (Australia)

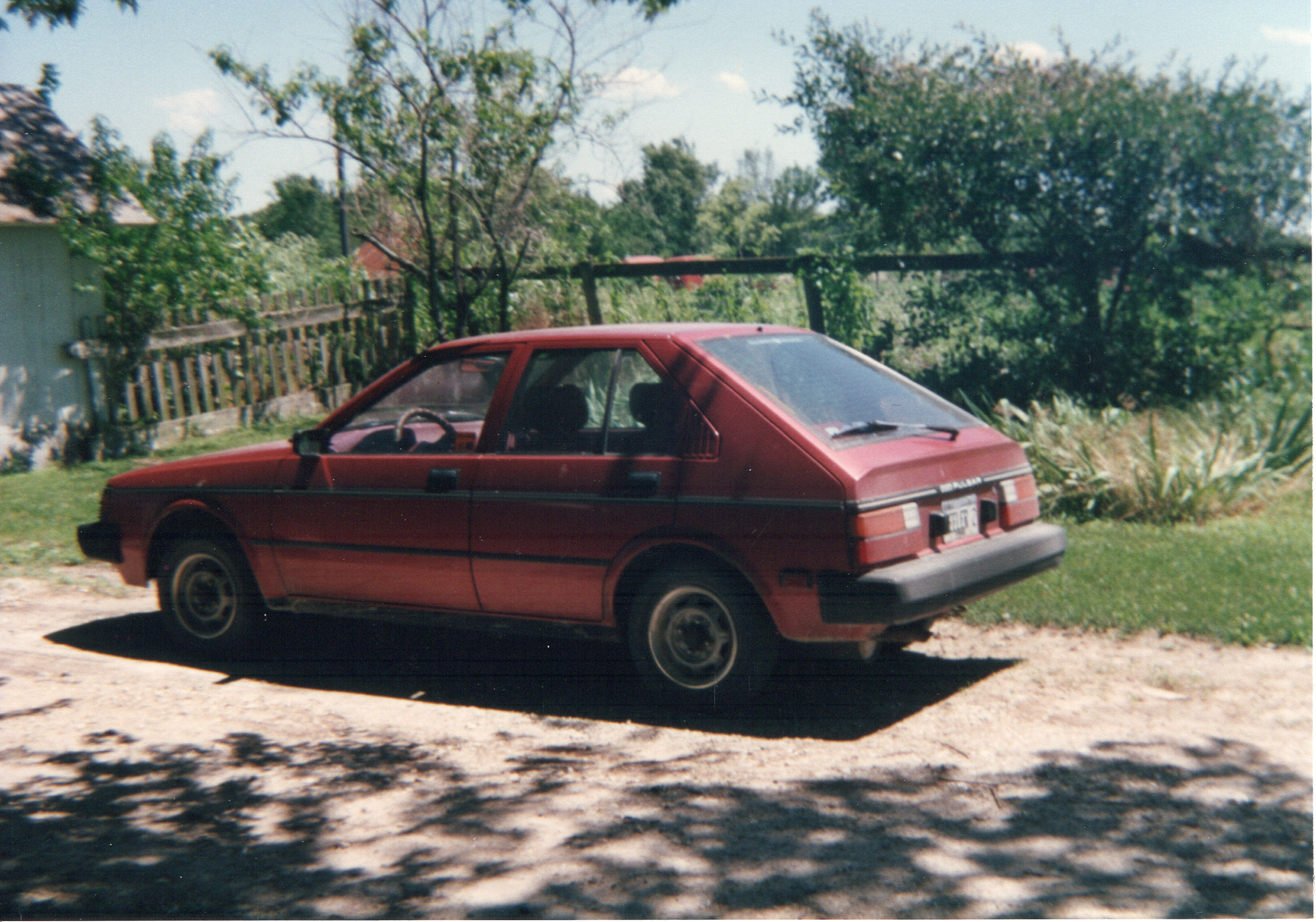
In the United States, the Pulsar hatchback was only sold for the 1983 model year

=== Asia ===
New Pulsar models were introduced in the Japanese home market with three- or five-door hatchback bodywork, as well as the Pulsar EXA two-door coupé. In June a four-door sedan arrived as well. Most Pulsars sold had flush-fitting, aerodynamic rectangular headlights, but the lowest-spec cars received smaller rectangular units set deeper within the grille surround. There was no van model of the N12 Pulsar; instead, Nissan Cherry stores sold a version of the B11-series AD Van as the "Pulsar AD." In May 1983 the 1.7-liter CD17 diesel and a 115 PS (85 kW) turbocharged petrol model were introduced. At the same time, a door mirror was fitted to some models rather than the traditional fender-mounted unit. The law had been changed only two months earlier, allowing for such fitment, and the Pulsar was the first Japanese car to take advantage of the change. The lowest-spec models, like the Pulsar TC, continued to use fender mirrors until the end of N12 production.

The series was facelifted at the end of March 1984, with wider and slimmer headlights. There were no longer two types of headlamps available. This is also when the Pulsar Milano trim level was introduced. This was a three-door hatchback with a more European and Italianate flair - while Alfa Romeo were not involved in its development, calling the model by the name of Alfa Romeo's hometown was a nod at the collaboration. In May 1985 the turbocharger was changed to a water-cooled design.

The Nissan Langley, in its second generation, was a Pulsar sold at Nissan Prince Store locations next to the Skyline, and shared many styling influences from the Skyline. The market acceptance of the Langley inspired Nissan to sell a second badge engineered version at Nissan Store as the Nissan Liberta Villa. This model partially replaced the larger Nissan Stanza clone called the Nissan Violet Liberta. The Liberta Villa was only available as a sedan, offered as a smaller companion to the Nissan Leopard (itself a Skyline clone). The top trim package was the SSS Turbo with the E15ET engine, and the top two trim packages offered multi-port fuel injection with the base model offering a carburetor—all with the 1.5-liter petrol engine. As with the Pulsar and the Langley, the CD17 diesel engine was also offered on the Liberta Villa. To celebrate Nissan's 50th anniversary in 1983, a limited production run of one-thousand Nissan Langley "50 Special" units were produced. It was exclusively available as a three-door hatchback, and color options were limited. The interior featured British-sourced fabric and "Langley" embroidery, and the exterior had twelve pieces of commemorative 50th Anniversary badging and varient-only equipment. This varient was powered by the naturally aspirated E15 engine, as it was not a top trim level and so didn't receive a E15ET turbocharged engine. From 1982 to 1984, a Super Silhouette race variant was produced, competing in the short lived Japanese group 5 series, which ran from 1979 to 1984, piloted by the all female team, the Langley Racing Angels, which were backed by Nissan.

In Singapore the Pulsar was clearly defined as a class below the Sunny (even though a Pulsar sedan is longer than a Sunny and sits on a longer wheelbase). While the Sunny could be had with 1.3 or 1.5-liter engines, the Pulsar was only available with the 1-litre E10 engine. It was also fitted with the small recessed lights used for the lowest-cost models. In Singaporean specifications, the E10 engine produces 52 bhp (39 kW; 53 PS) DIN and was also available together with air conditioning.

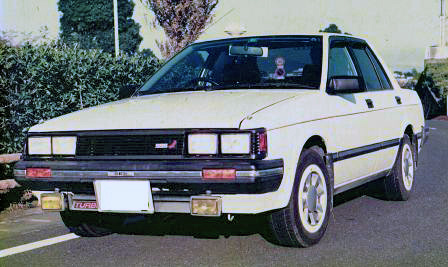
1986 Nissan Liberta Villa SSS sedan (Japan)

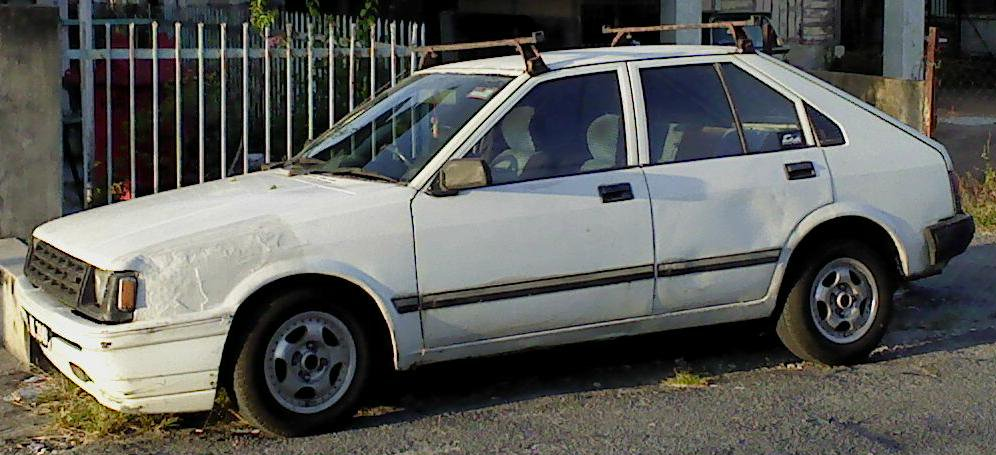
Nissan Langley (N12) 5-door hatchback (Malaysia)

=== Australasia ===
The Australian market Pulsar N12 series arrived in October 1982. Offered as a five-door hatchback, 1.3-liter TC and 1.5-liter TS specifications featured. These early cars were manufactured in Japan. May 1983 saw the debut of an update to the Australian range. Now produced locally, the update heralded minor trim changes, suspension and steering revisions and new seats. Specification levels were overhauled with the Pulsar E opening up the range with its 1.3-liter engine, followed by the 1.5-liter GL and GX. In October 1983 the sedan body was introduced in GL and GX guises (1.5-liter). A turbocharged Pulsar ET five-door arrived in April 1984, sharing its engine and trim with the EXA. It was only available with a five-speed manual. The ET also had alloy wheels, a modified suspension and various aerodynamic improvements. The engine was imported fully built from Japan, which placed a limit on how many ETs could be built without falling afoul of laws on local content.

The next update came in August 1984 alongside a badge engineered twin, the Holden Astra (LB)—a scheme devised under the Button car plan. To differentiate the Pulsar, Nissan Australia applied the upmarket Japanese market Langley body details for its facelift. The headlamps were now fitted as quad units and narrower horizontal tail lamps distinguished the rear styling. Other changes included an increase in specification, minor suspension calibrations, and refreshed interior trims. Sedan versions had their facelift delayed until November that year, and the ET hatchback lingered on with the older styling until the demise of the N12 in 1987. The Australian-built Pulsar ET was also exported to New Zealand, beginning in 1985 - these were the first fully built up cars to be exported by Nissan Australia.

The final Australian N12 update arrived in April 1986 prior to the 1987 N13 introduction. The Holden version was known as the LC Astra. The revisions brought further trim changes, tweaks to the five-speed manual transmission, new colours, a new entry-level DX model, a change from GX to GXE, and the introduction of a larger displacement 1.6-liter engine tuned for unleaded petrol replacing the 1.3- and 1.5-liter leaded units used previously. The ET model also saw its 1.5-liter turbocharged engine updated for unleaded fuel.

The N12 was assembled in New Zealand at Nissan NZ's plant in Wiri South Auckland from 1982, and facelifted in 1984 when the main change was a switch to the now compulsory laminated windscreen. This generation was offered in both three and five door hatchback form with both 1.3- and 1.5-liter Nissan E-series engines shared with the also locally assembled Sunny sedan (NZ did not import the equivalent Pulsar sedan). The Holden Astra badged variant was not sold in New Zealand. The EXA Coupé was a limited official Nissan import new but thousands more Japanese market specification models arrived in the later 1980s and early 1990s when the NZ market was opened up to used imports.

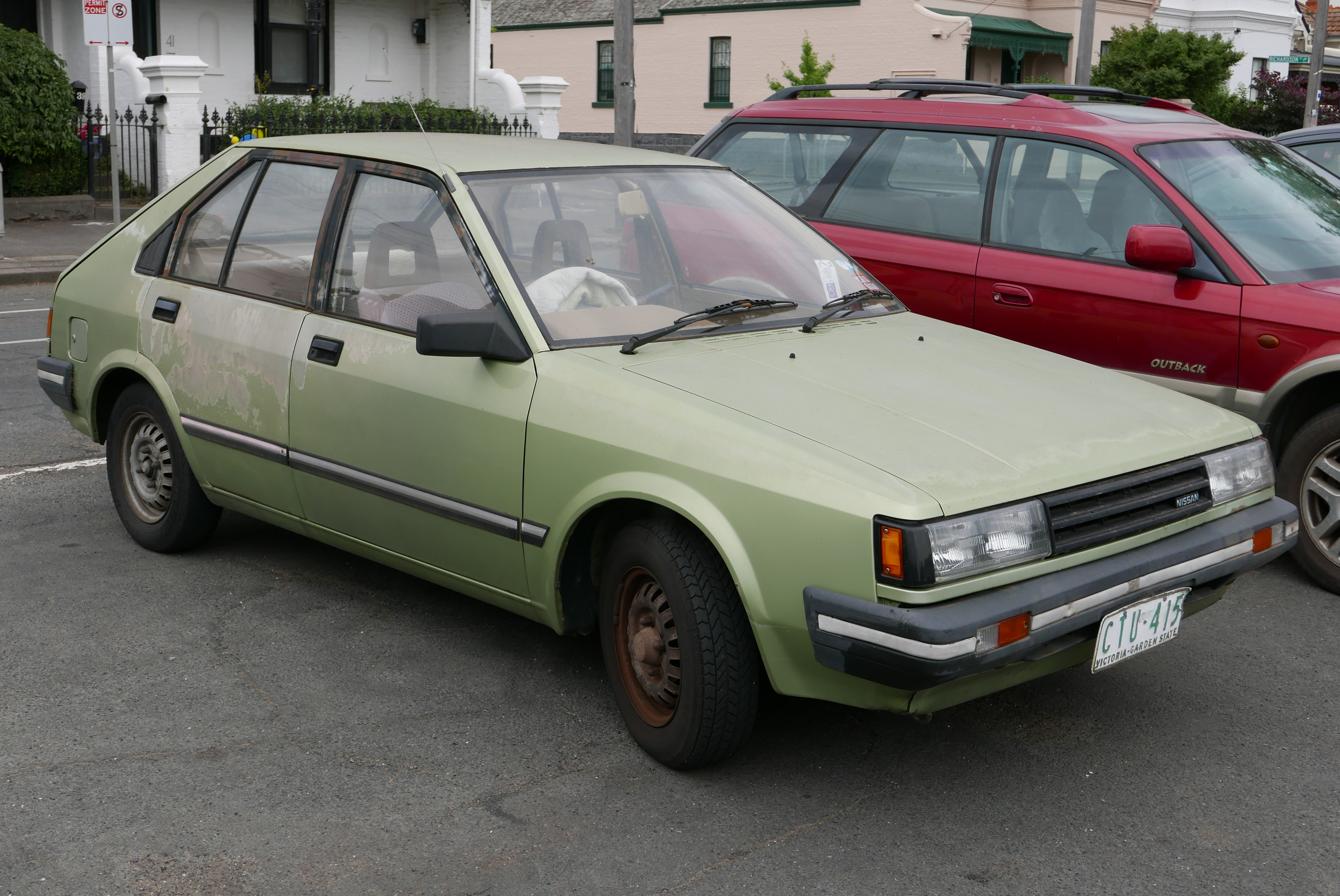
1984–1986 Nissan Pulsar GL 5-door (Australia)

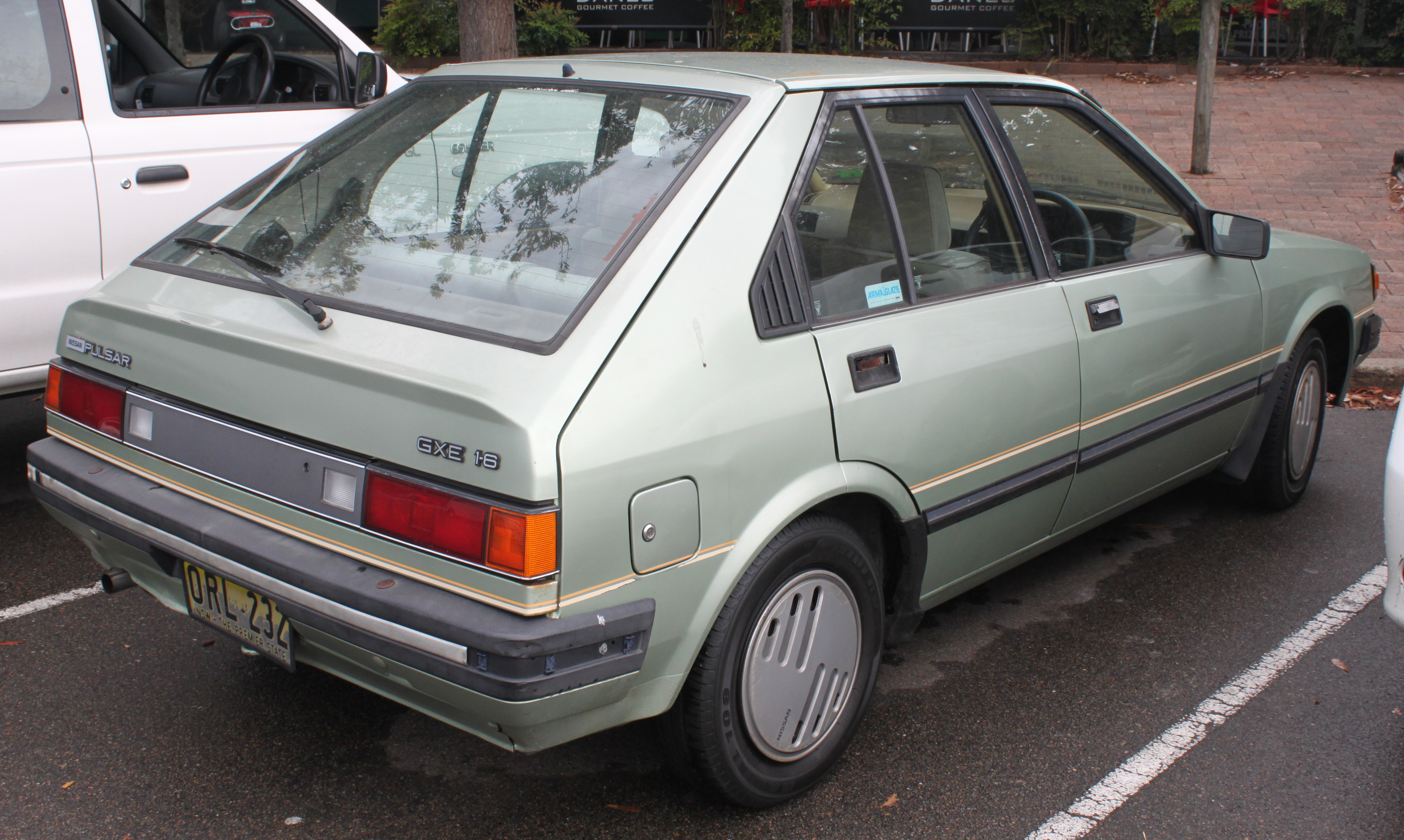
1986–1987 Nissan Pulsar GXE 5-door (Australia)

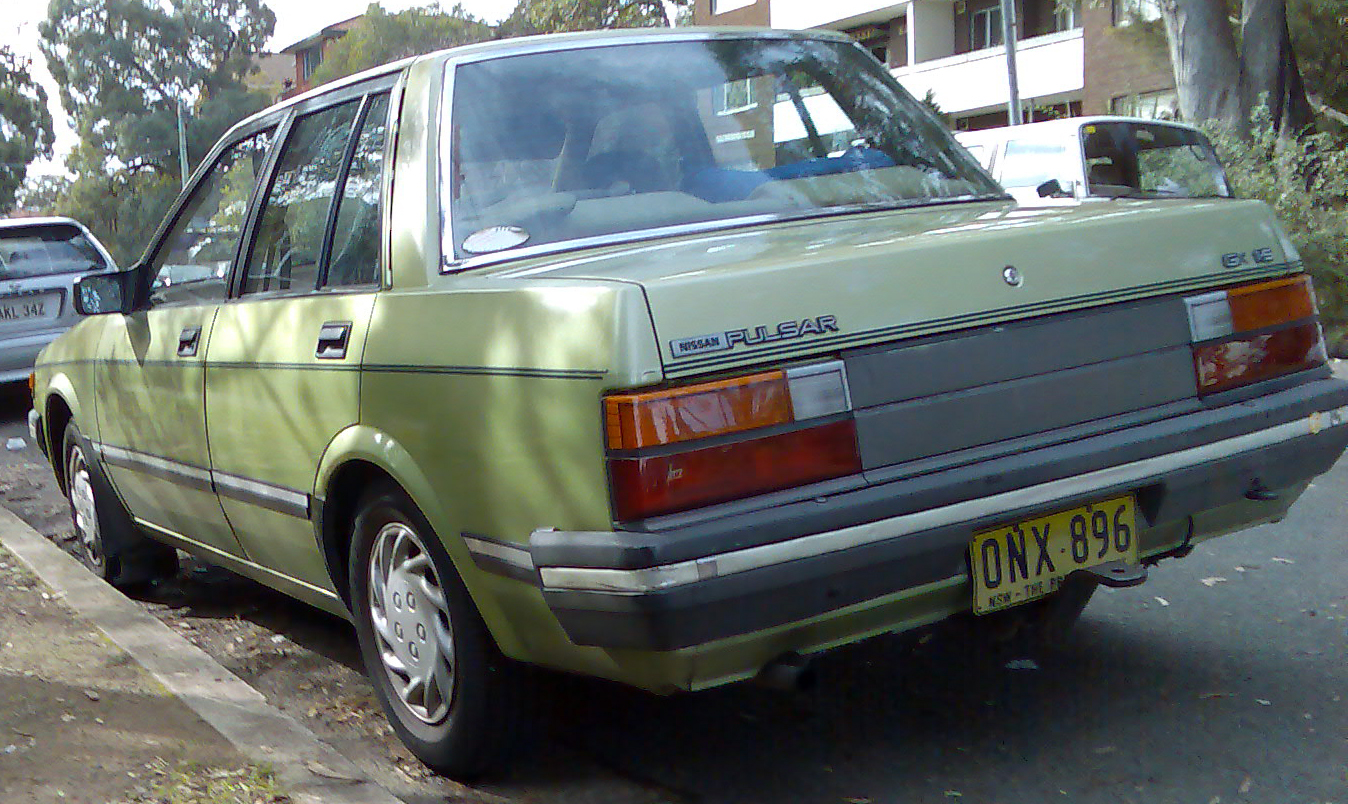
1984–1986 Nissan Pulsar GX sedan (Australia)

=== Europe ===
The European market Cherrys were available with engines ranging from a 1.0-liter, 50 PS (37 kW) petrol unit via a 1270 cc 60 PS, a 1488 cc 70 PS, up to the 114 PS (84 kW) turbocharged 1.5-liter E15ET and also included the diesel CD17. The 1.7-liter diesel option was first introduced in early 1983; this was the first Cherry diesel. Only a small "diesel" badge on the bootlid betrayed the engine option. To accommodate the extra 65 kg (143 lb) over the front axle, the diesel received stronger front springs and a model-specific, slightly larger, single-spoke steering wheel to counteract what would have otherwise been a heavier steering.

The Cherry Turbo was an attempt at breaking into the then very popular GTi category, but being a somewhat half-hearted effort it did not have much of an impact in the marketplace. The Turbo sat on comparatively skinny Dunlop tires and had few changes aside from its many stickers and the turbocharger. Period tests complained about peaky power delivery (and the same long gear ratios as for the regular Cherry), torque steer, and a harsh ride. The Pulsar/Cherry underwent a light facelift in July 1984.

This model was also built in Italy by Alfa Romeo as the Arna (named after the joint venture which created it, Alfa Romeo Nissan Autoveicoli), using Alfa Romeo boxer engines. Confusingly, the Italian-made models were also sold in the United Kingdom and Spain as the "Nissan Cherry Europe", in order to circumvent quotas on Japanese-made cars. At Alfa Romeo, the Arna was meant to replace lesser versions of the popular Alfasud, but the Arna never had the Italian car's appeal. The Cherry Europe also failed in its "home" market (Europe), as it lacked the build quality and reliability of its Japanese built twin car.

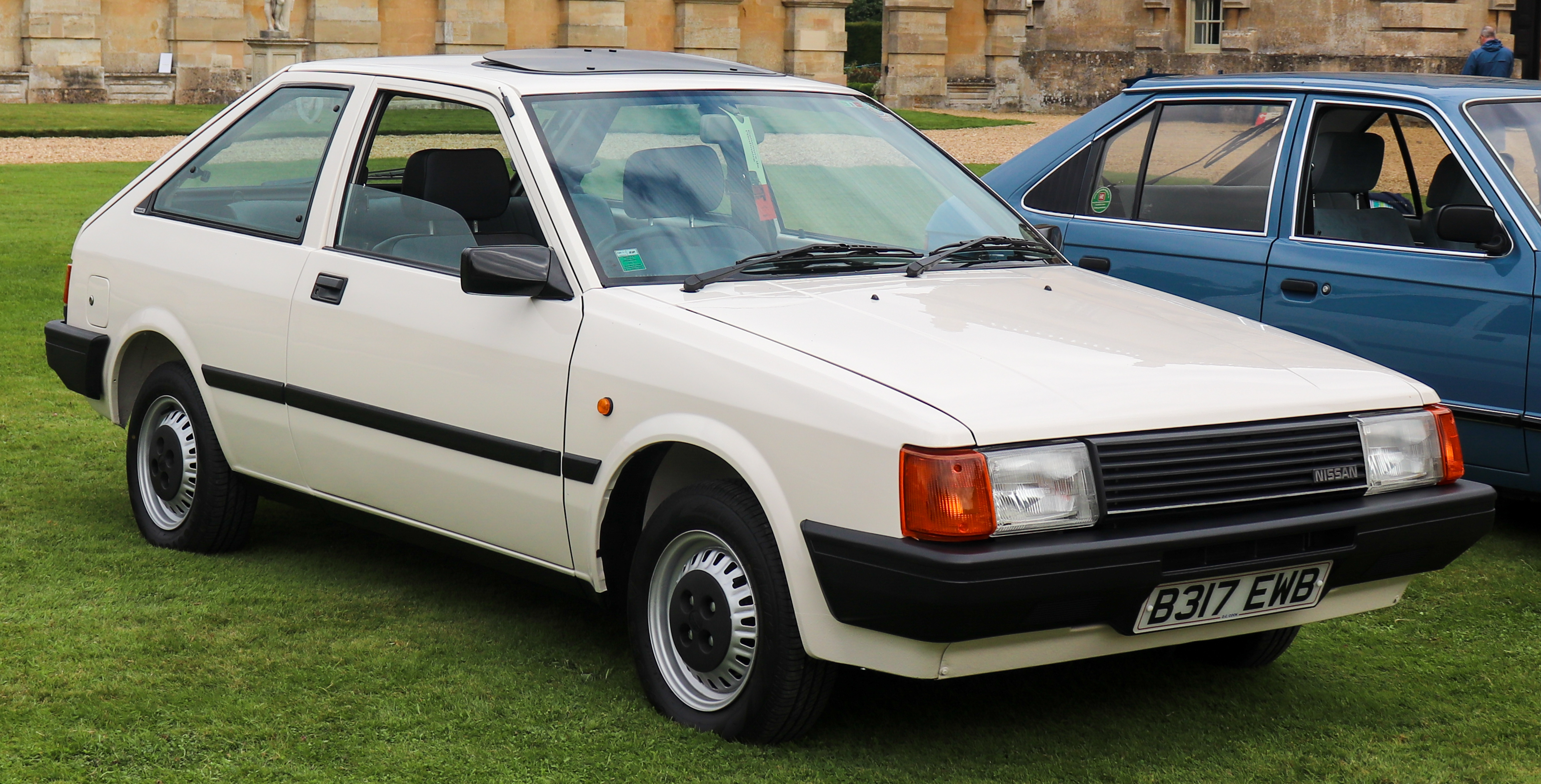
Nissan Cherry Europe

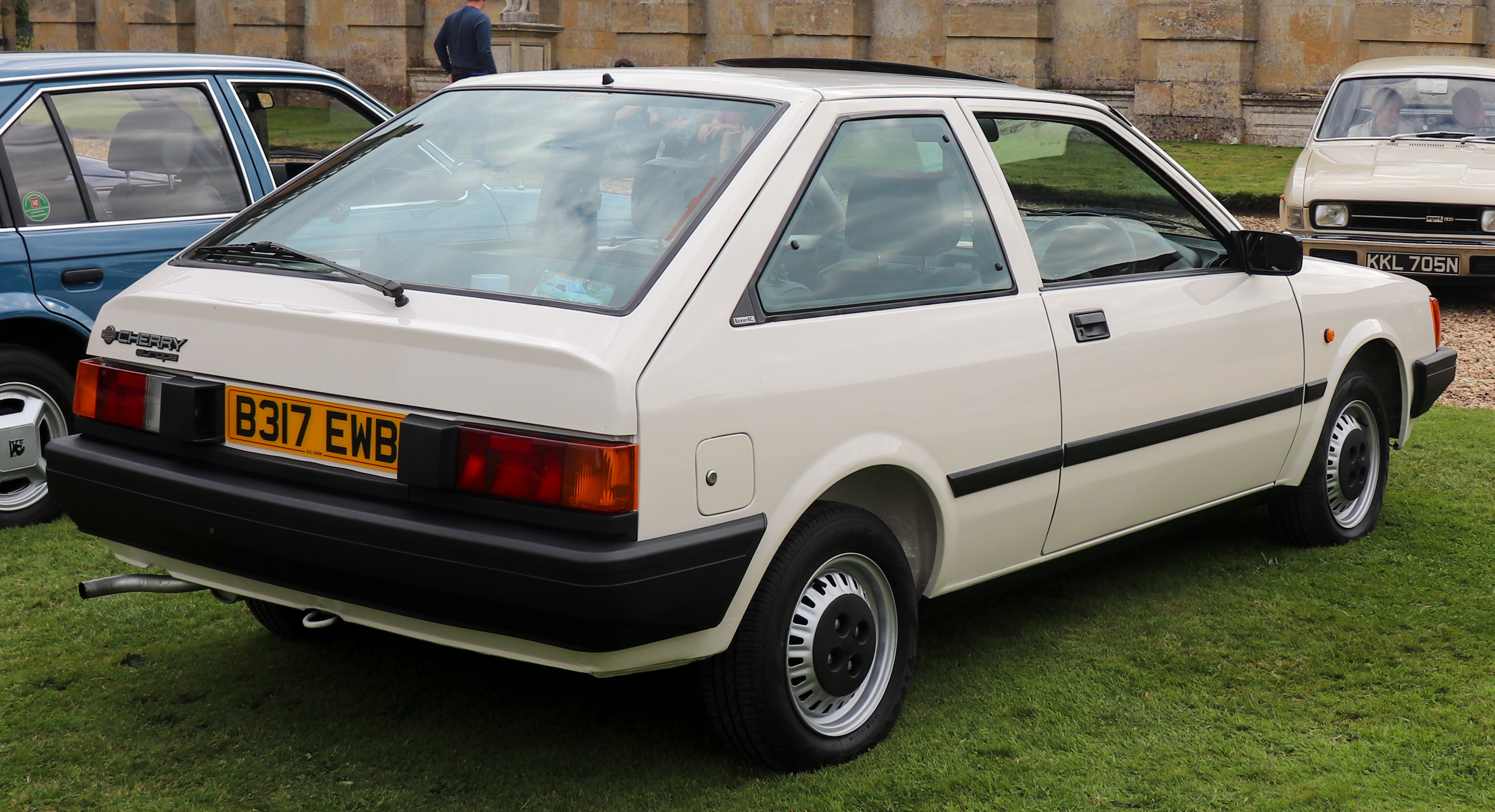
Nissan Cherry Europe, showing Italian model light clusters as also seen on the Alfa Romeo Arna

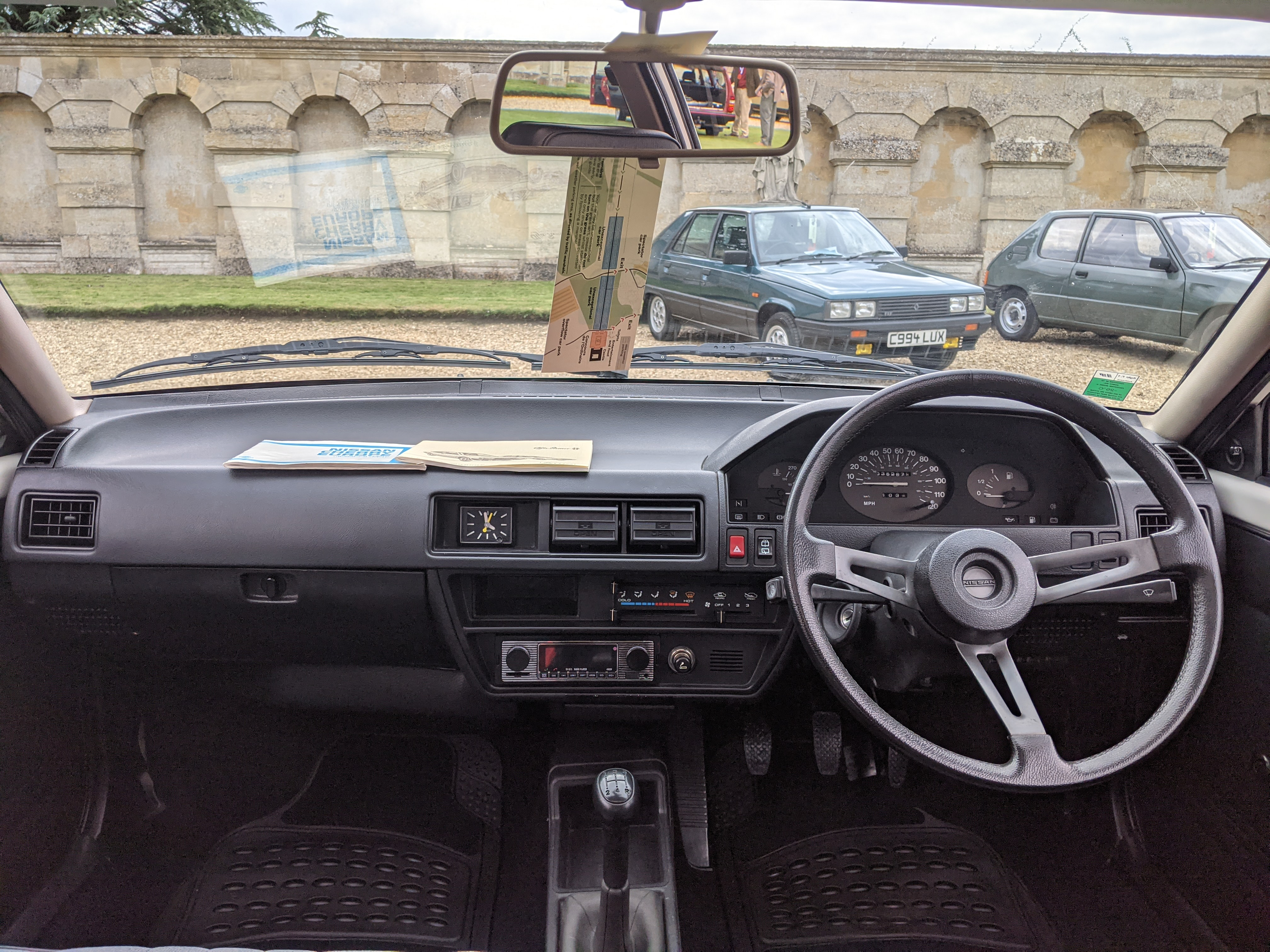
Interior

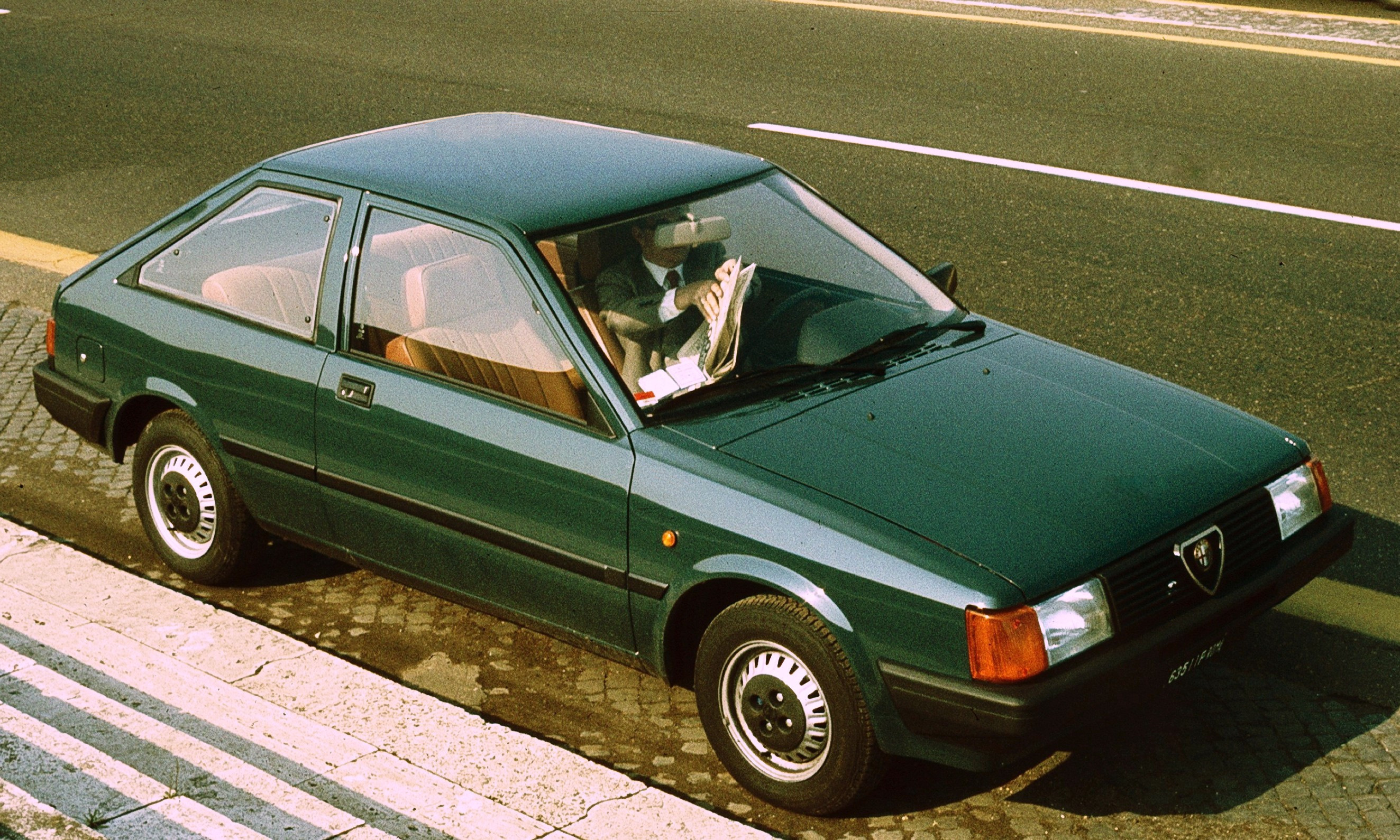
Alfa Romeo Arna (three-door)

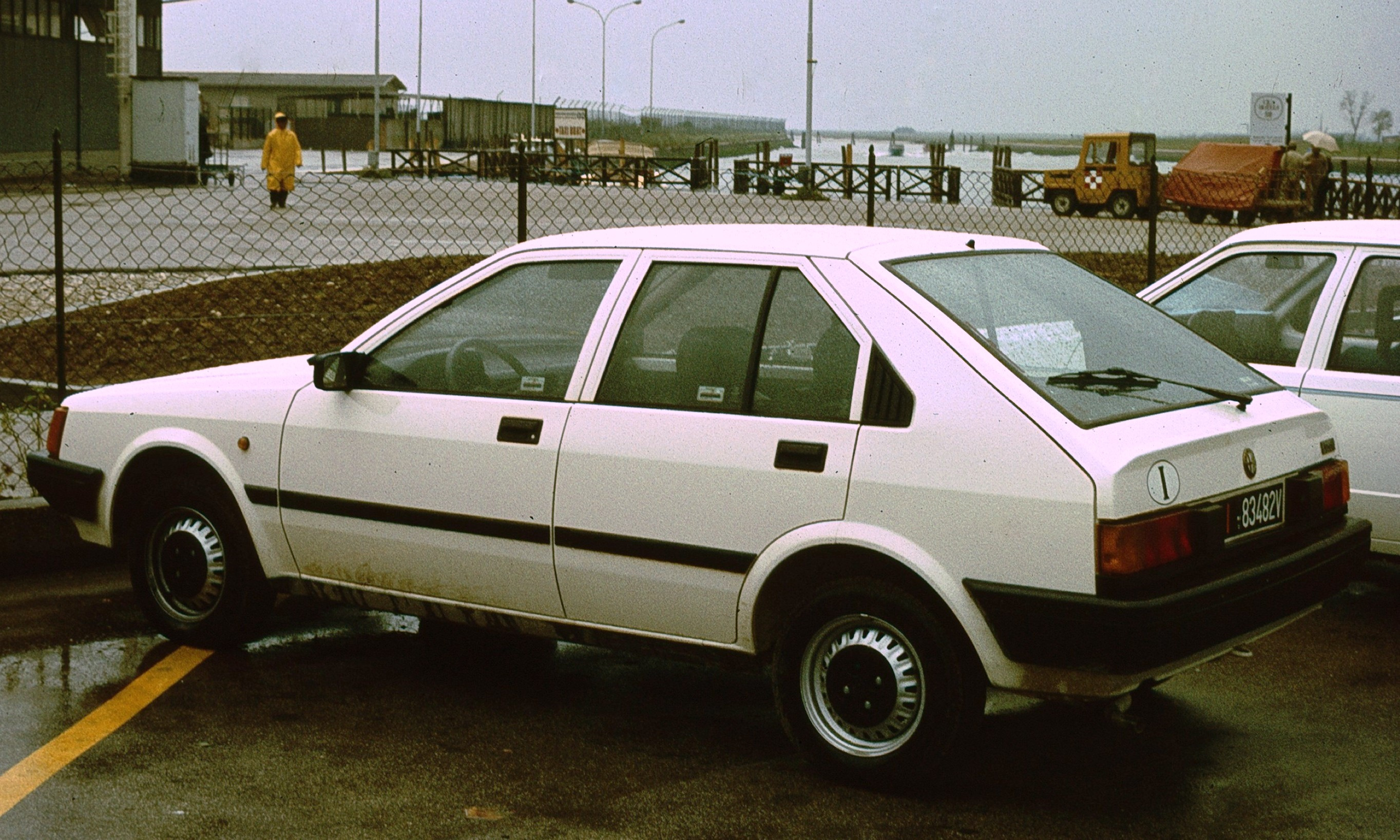
Rear view Alfa Romeo Arna (five-door)

== N13 (1986) ==
N13
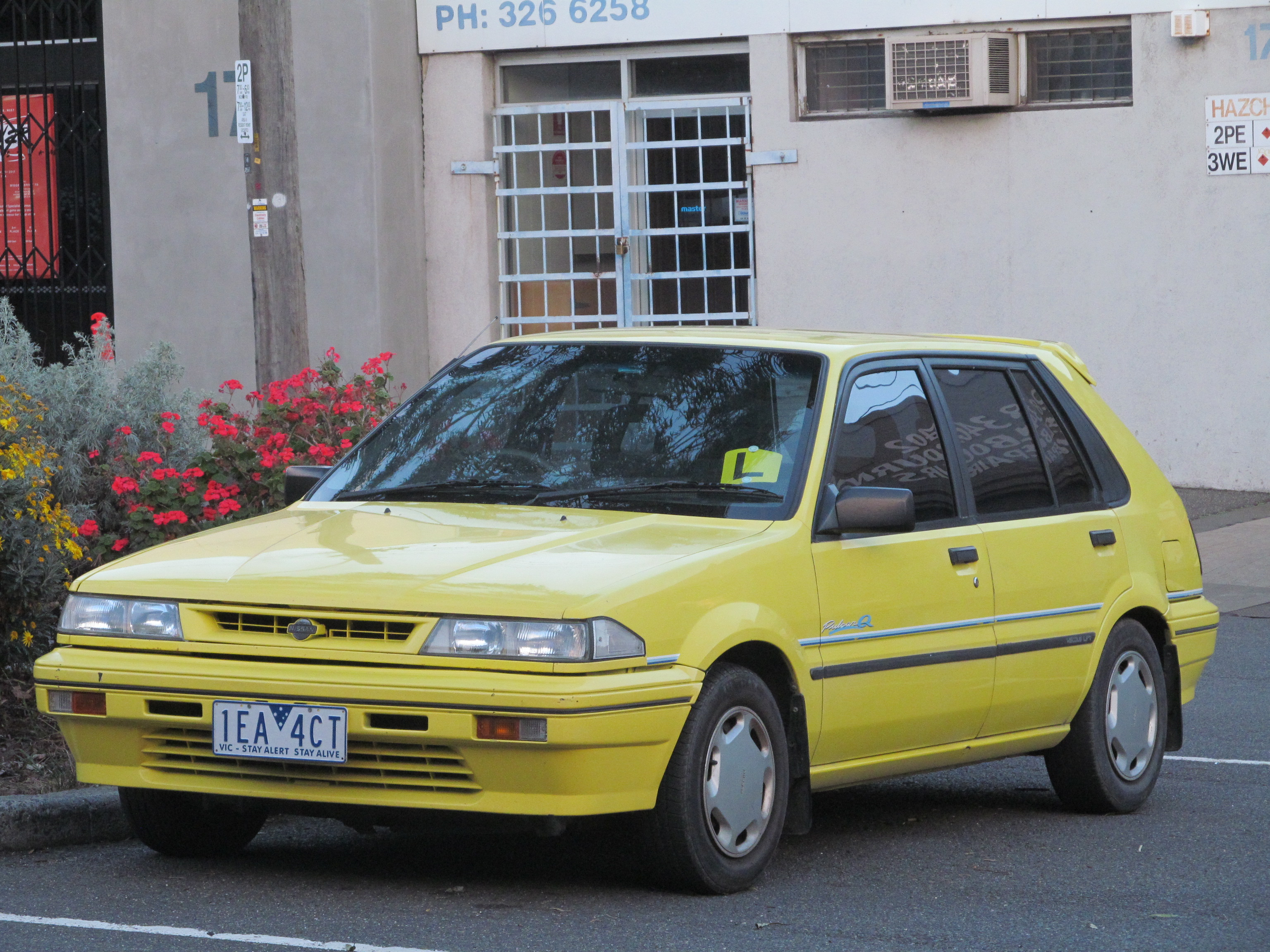
- 1990 Nissan Pulsar Q Hatchback (N13, Australia)

Overview
- Also called: Nissan Cherry (Greece); Nissan Langley; Nissan Liberta Villa; Nissan Sentra (Malaysia, New Zealand); Nissan Sunny (Europe); Holden Astra (LD)
- Production: 1986–1990; July 1987–1991 (Australia)
- Assembly: Japan: Oppama Plant, Yokosuka, Kanagawa; Australia: Clayton South, Victoria; Greece: Volos (TEOKAR); New Zealand: Wiri

Body and chassis
- Body style: 3-door hatchback 5-door hatchback 4-door sedan
- Layout: Front-engine, front-wheel-drive Front-engine, all-wheel-drive
- Related: Nissan EXA (N13)

Powertrain
- Engine: 988 cc E10 I4; 1270 cc E13 I4; 1392 cc GA14S/GA14DS I4; 1487 cc E15 I4; 1497 cc GA15S I4; 1597 cc E16 I4; 1597 cc GA16S I4; 1598 cc 16LF (GM) I4 (Australia); 1598 cc CA16DE DOHC I4; 1796 cc 18LE (GM) I4 (Australia); 1809 cc CA18DE DOHC I4; 1680 cc CD17 diesel I4
- Transmission: 4-speed manual 5-speed manual 3-speed automatic

Dimensions
- Wheelbase: 2,431 mm (95.7 in)
- Length: 4,229 mm (166.5 in)
- Width: 1,679 mm (66.1 in)
- Height: 1,295 mm (51.0 in)

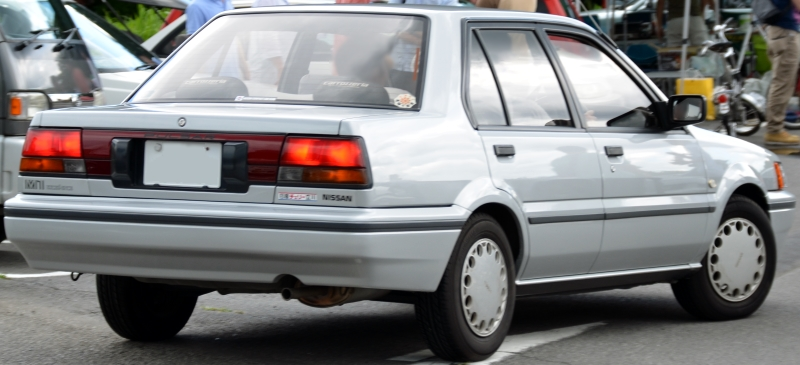
Facelift Nissan Pulsar sedan (Japan)

In 1986, Nissan's design chief refused to follow the smoother, aerodynamic look of other cars, and told his design team to come up with an affordable, subcompact car. A squarer Pulsar N13 series was released as a result; innovations included a permanently four-wheel drive model with a viscous coupling which appeared in May 1986. In February 1987 a version with three viscous couplings was introduced: one for each axle and one in between. This was originally limited to a production of 200 cars, at a price increase 50 percent higher than for the regular four-wheel-drive version. For 1988 it became a regularly available model; this was very similar to the Attesa system which first appeared in the Bluebird soon thereafter. In 1986, the Pulsar won the Car of the Year Japan award. Capitalizing on the popularity of the larger R31 series Nissan Skyline, this generation shares many visual styling cues with the larger car.

The N13 series EXA was spun off as its own model internationally, but retained the Pulsar NX name in the United States. It was designated as the N13 series, despite actually being based on the Nissan Sunny (B12) chassis.

=== Asia ===
The Pulsar was sold in Japan as a three- and five-door hatchback, plus a four-door sedan. There was no turbocharged version of the N13 Pulsar, with Nissan choosing to focus on multivalve engines instead. In April 1988, the 1.5-litre engines were changed to the new GA generation.

The Langley and the Liberta Villa (both sold as sedans and three-door hatchbacks) also continued sales in Japan as upmarket versions of the Pulsar, with a limited engine lineup. Both the Langley and Liberta Villa had slightly different bodywork to the Japanese-specification Pulsar—although most parts were interchangeable. Langley and Liberta Villa three-doors sported completely redesigned rear-ends, which were slightly longer and tapered off in a notchback-like manner and were much sportier in appearance with their more steeply raked rear windows. The sedans featured reshaped upper doors (windows), rear windshields, rear quarter panels, and are noted for the repositioning of the license plate to the rear bumper from the boot lid. The Langley and Liberta Villa were themselves differentiated by their own frontal styling. Compared to the Pulsar, the Langley had narrower trapezoidal-shaped headlamps and a unique grille—whereas the Liberta Villa had narrow rectangular-shaped lights and again its own grille design. The N13 Langley and Liberta Villa featured other options such as a limited-slip differential, luxurious interior and the much sought-after black headlights on the Langley, centre grille and round Skyline-style taillights, with the equipment shared in the Liberta Villa. The Japanese-market Langley five-door hatchback was dropped with the N13.

In Malaysia, the N13 Pulsar was sold as the Nissan Sentra, which was introduced in 1987 to replace the slow selling B12 Sentra. From mid-1989 it became available with the 12-valve GA16S engine, in a model called the SLX Super-valve.

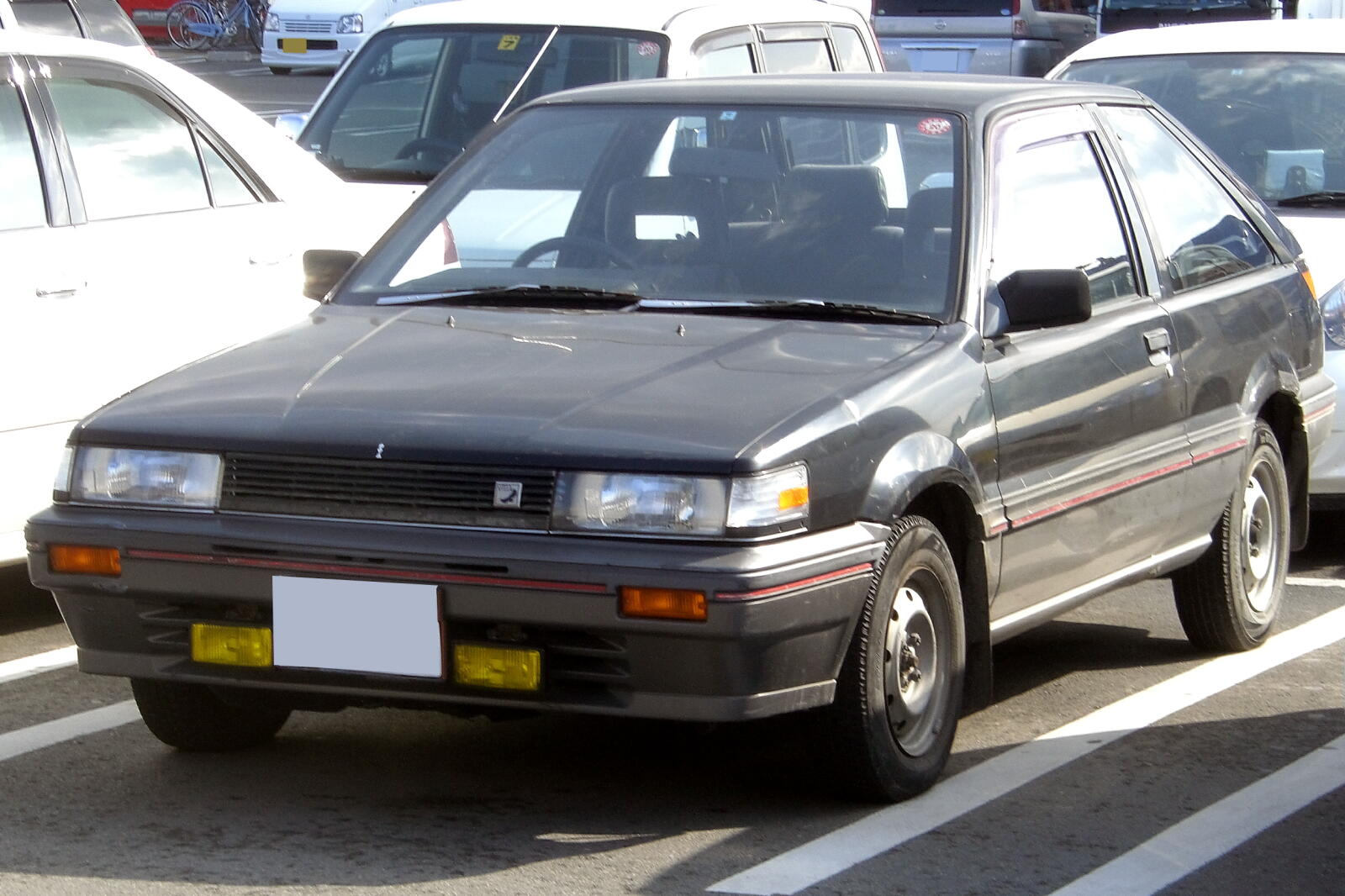
Nissan Liberta Villa 3-door (Japan)

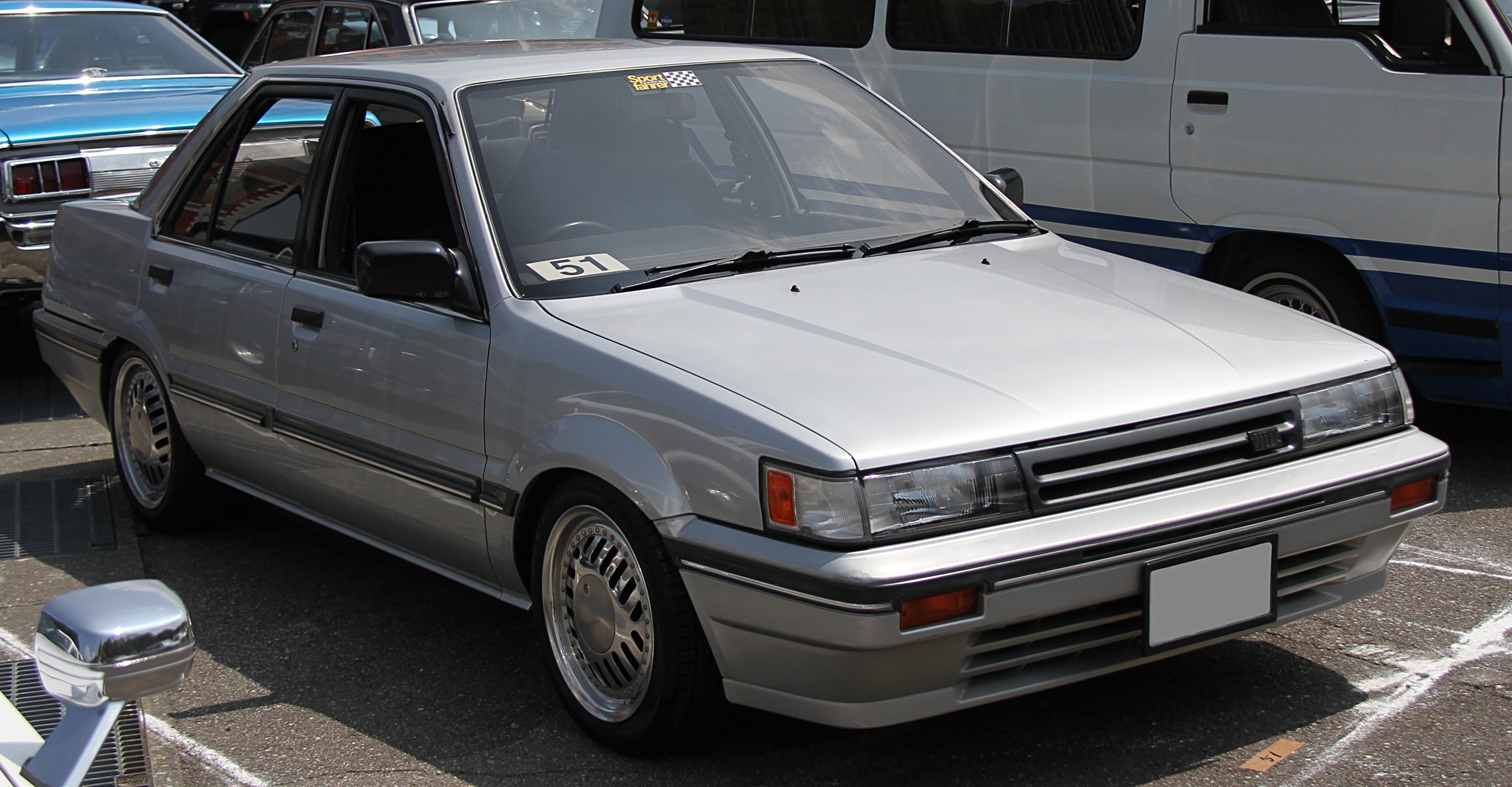
Nissan Liberta Villa sedan (Japan)
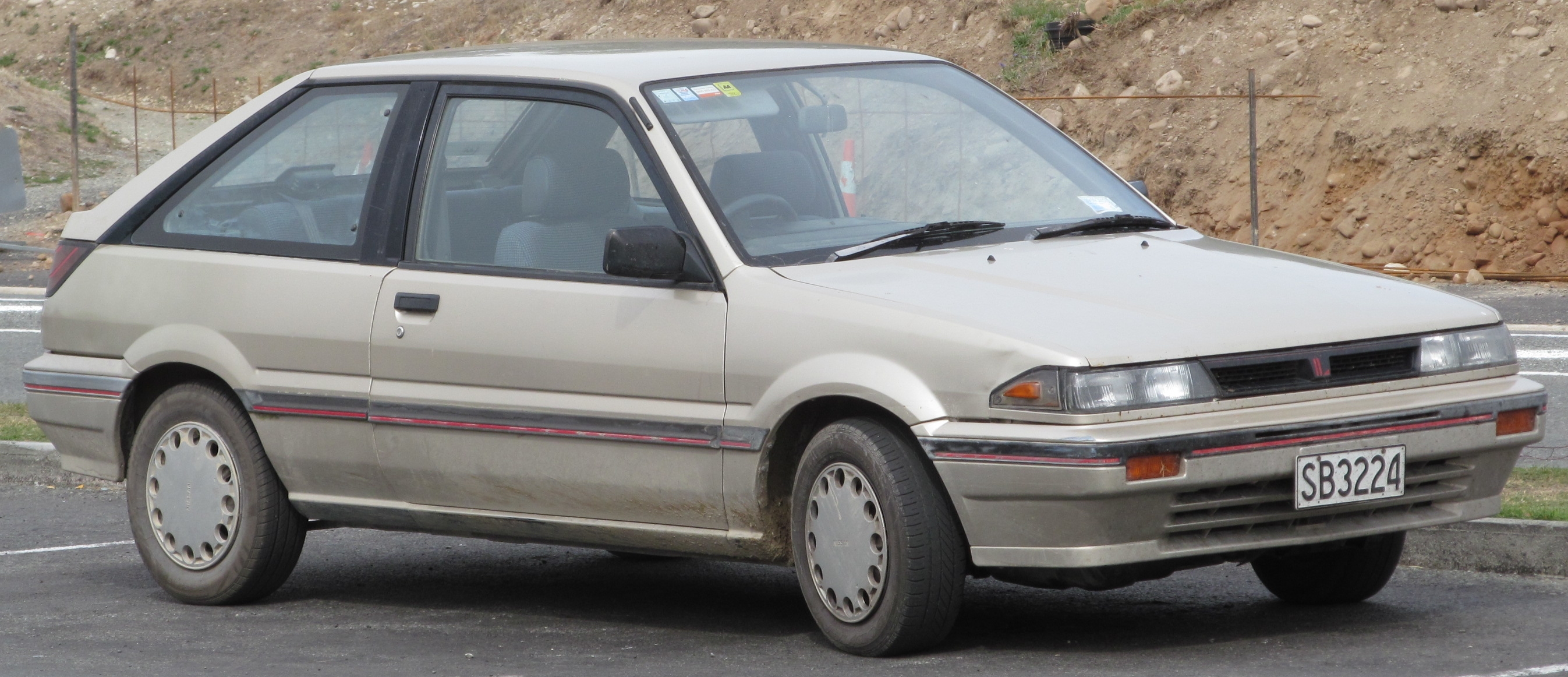
Nissan Langley 3-door (Japan)

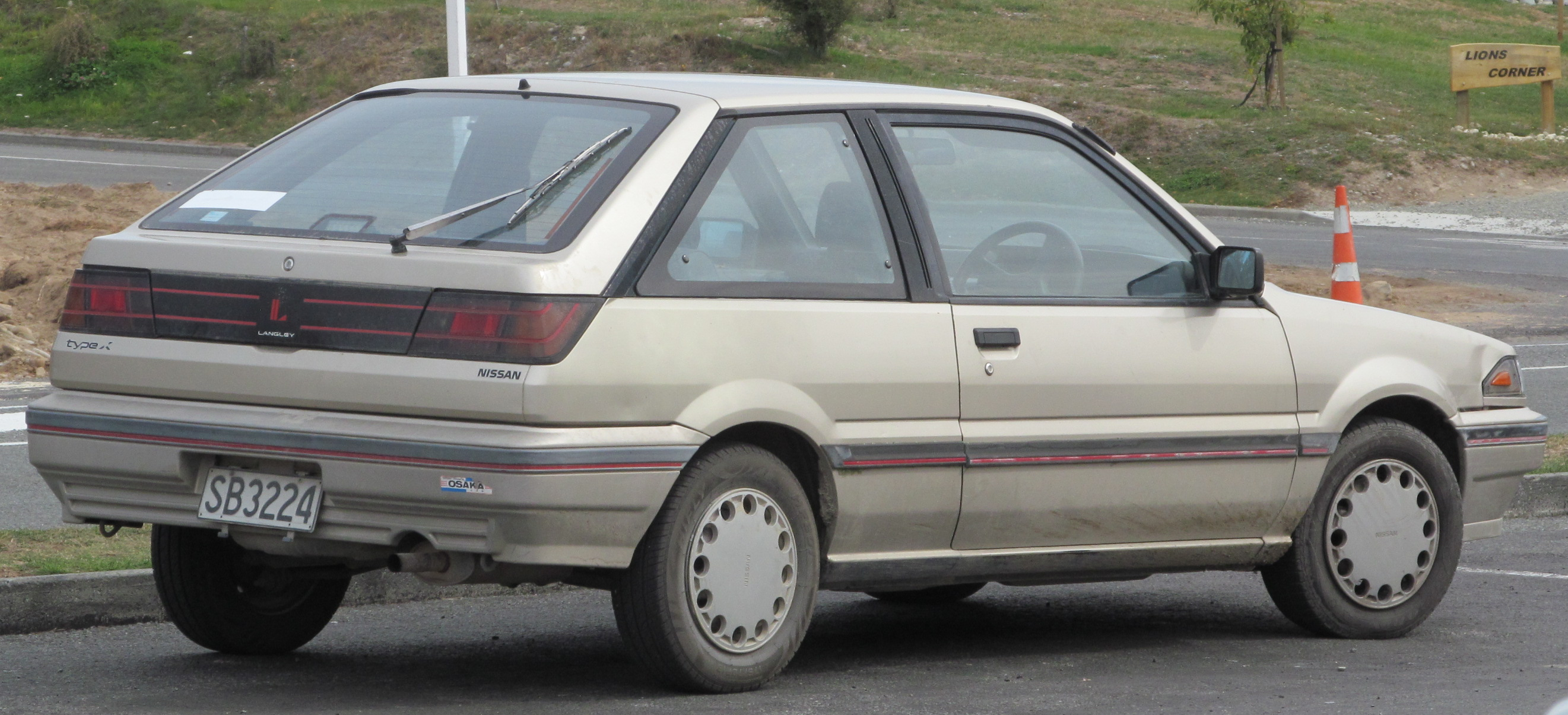
Nissan Langley 3-door (Japan)

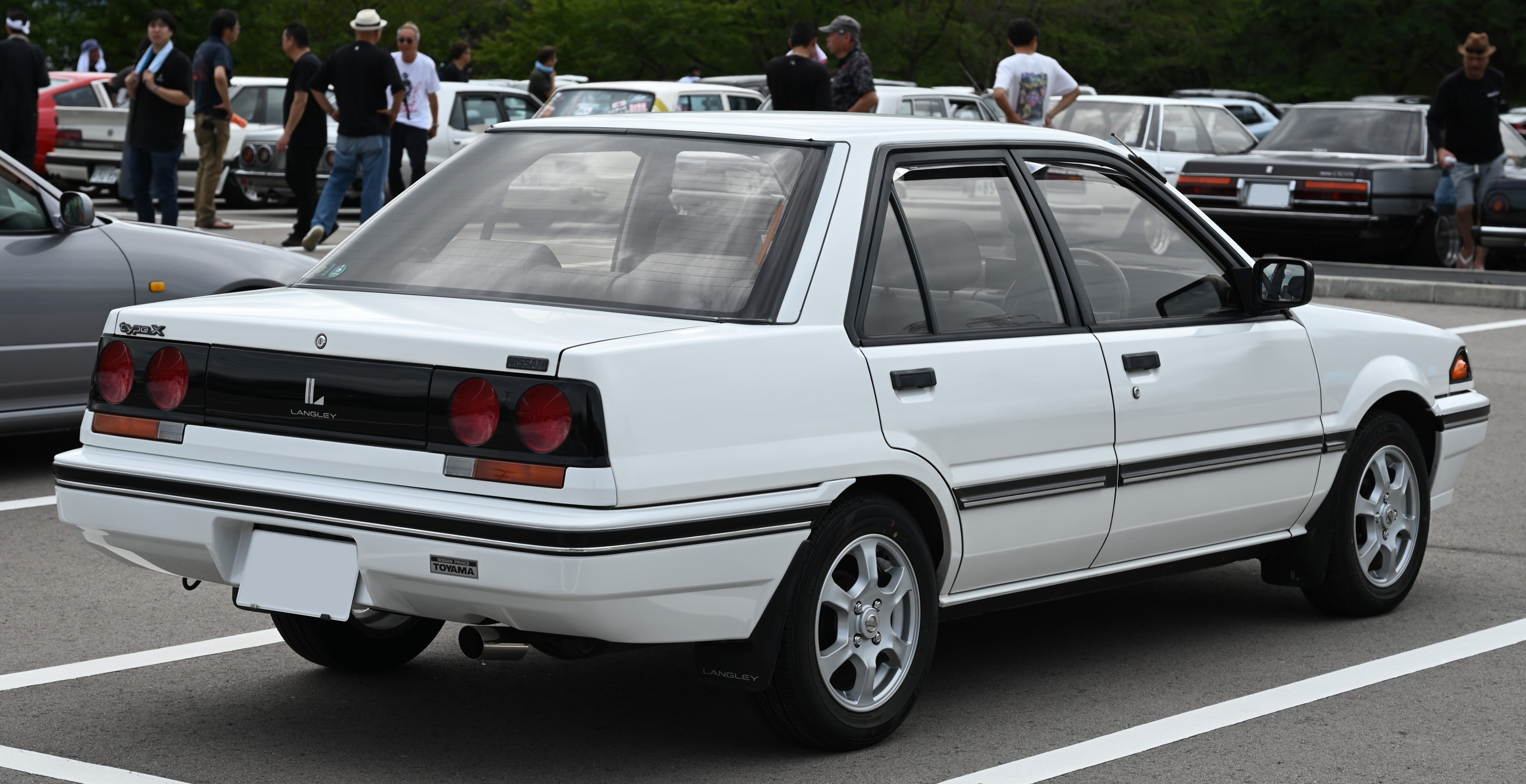
Nissan Langley sedan (Japan)

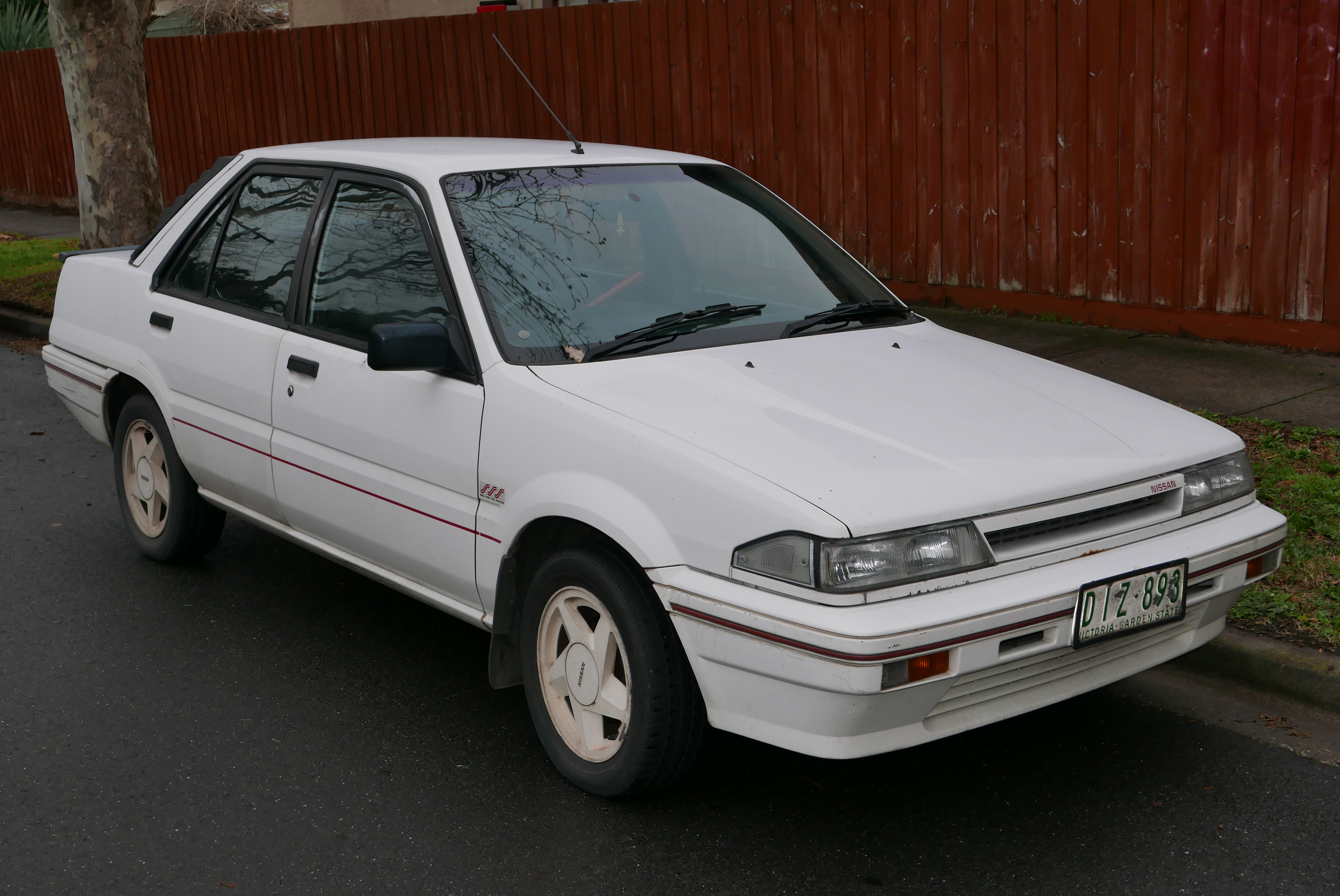
1988–1991 Nissan Pulsar SSS Vector sedan (Australia)

=== Oceania ===
The Pulsar–Astra relationship continued in Australia, with the series there continuing to use the more upmarket Langley sedan as the donor vehicle. The sedan version was called the Pulsar Vector. The five-door hatchback was also offered, but this model differed from the Japanese Pulsar with reshaped upper doors (windows) and rear quarter panels. The development of the model was a collaboration with Holden, using the Family II engine built in Australia. Nissan introduced a facelift in 1989. After Holden ended their cooperation with Nissan in 1989 (and took up with Toyota instead), sales of the Holden Astra came to an end. Nissan Australia, however, kept using the GM engines until the succeeding N14 version was introduced.

four-cylinder engines offered in the Australian built version were:

- 1.6 L Family II 16LF, 1,598 cc, single point TBI, SOHC, 56 kW (75 hp) at 5,600 rpm, 125 N⋅m (92 lb⋅ft) at 3,600 rpm
- 1.8 L Family II 18LE, 1,796 cc, multi point EFI, SOHC, 79 kW (106 hp) at 5,600 rpm, 151 N⋅m (111 lb⋅ft) at 3,600 rpm
- 1.8 L Family II 18LE, 1,796 cc, multi point EFI, SOHC, 84 kW (113 hp) at 5,600 rpm, 162 N⋅m (119 lb⋅ft) at 3,600 rpm (SVD)

In New Zealand, the previous Sunny and Pulsar ranges were replaced by a single model line now called the Nissan Sentra—which were based on the Japanese market Pulsar and again mostly locally assembled, all with Japanese-manufactured Nissan engines. Versions in New Zealand were available in four body shapes; three-door hatchback (SG, SR), five-door hatchback (SGS, ZXE), four-door sedan (SG, SGS, ZXE), and a five-door "Sportwagon" (SG, SGS).

Six engines were offered over this generation:

- 1.3 – SG – 1985–1989 – E13
- 1.4 – SG/SGS – 1989–1991 – GA14S (59 kW (79 hp) at 6,200 rpm, 111 N⋅m (82 lb⋅ft) at 4,000 rpm)
- 1.6 – ZXE – 1985–1989 – E16
- 1.6 – ZXE – 1989–1991 – GA16S (69 kW (92 hp) at 6,000 rpm, 133 N⋅m (98 lb⋅ft) at 3,200 rpm)
- 1.6 – SR twin cam – CA16DE
- 1.8 – GTI – CA18DE
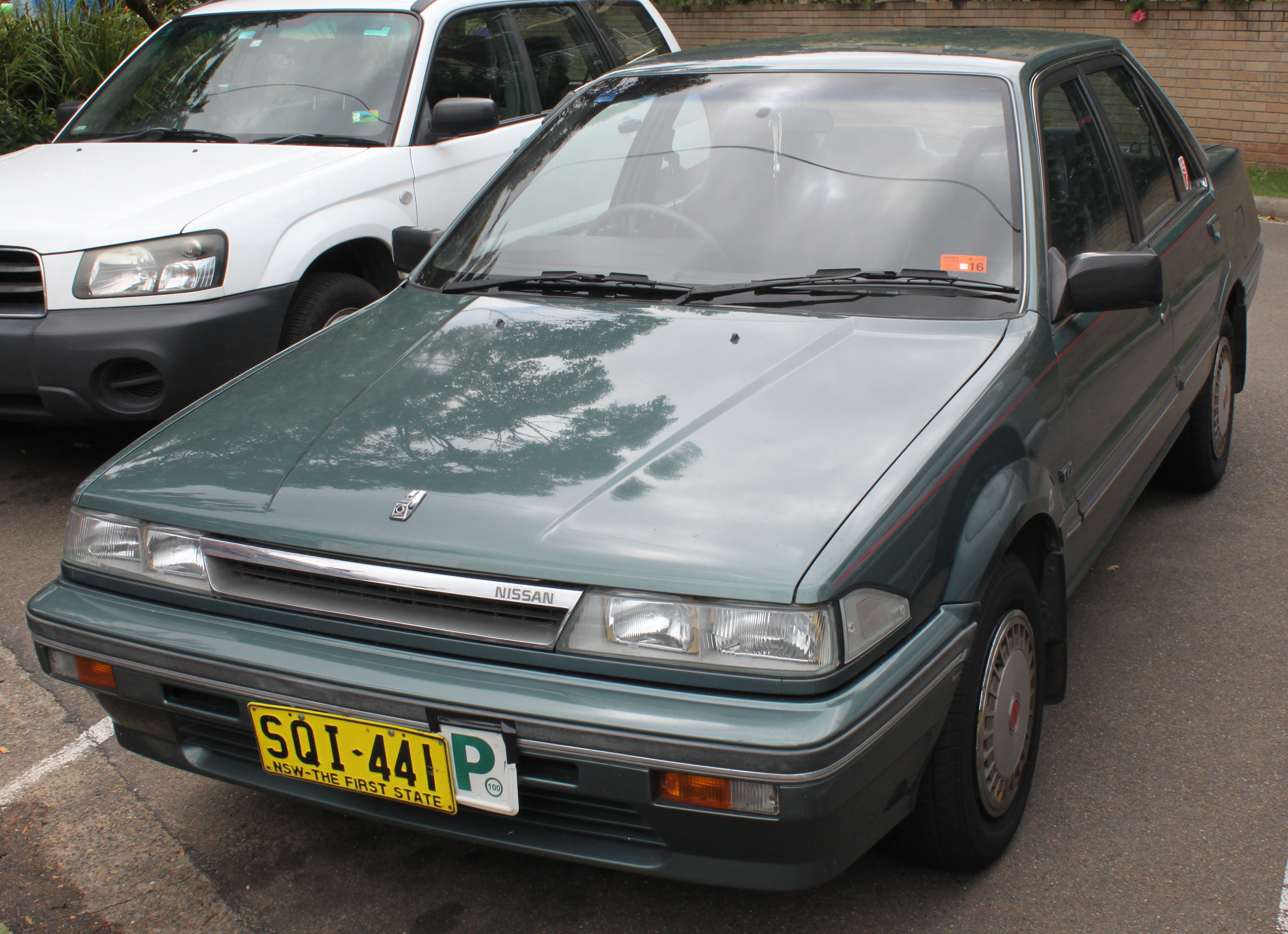
1987–1989 Nissan Pulsar Vector Ti sedan (Australia)

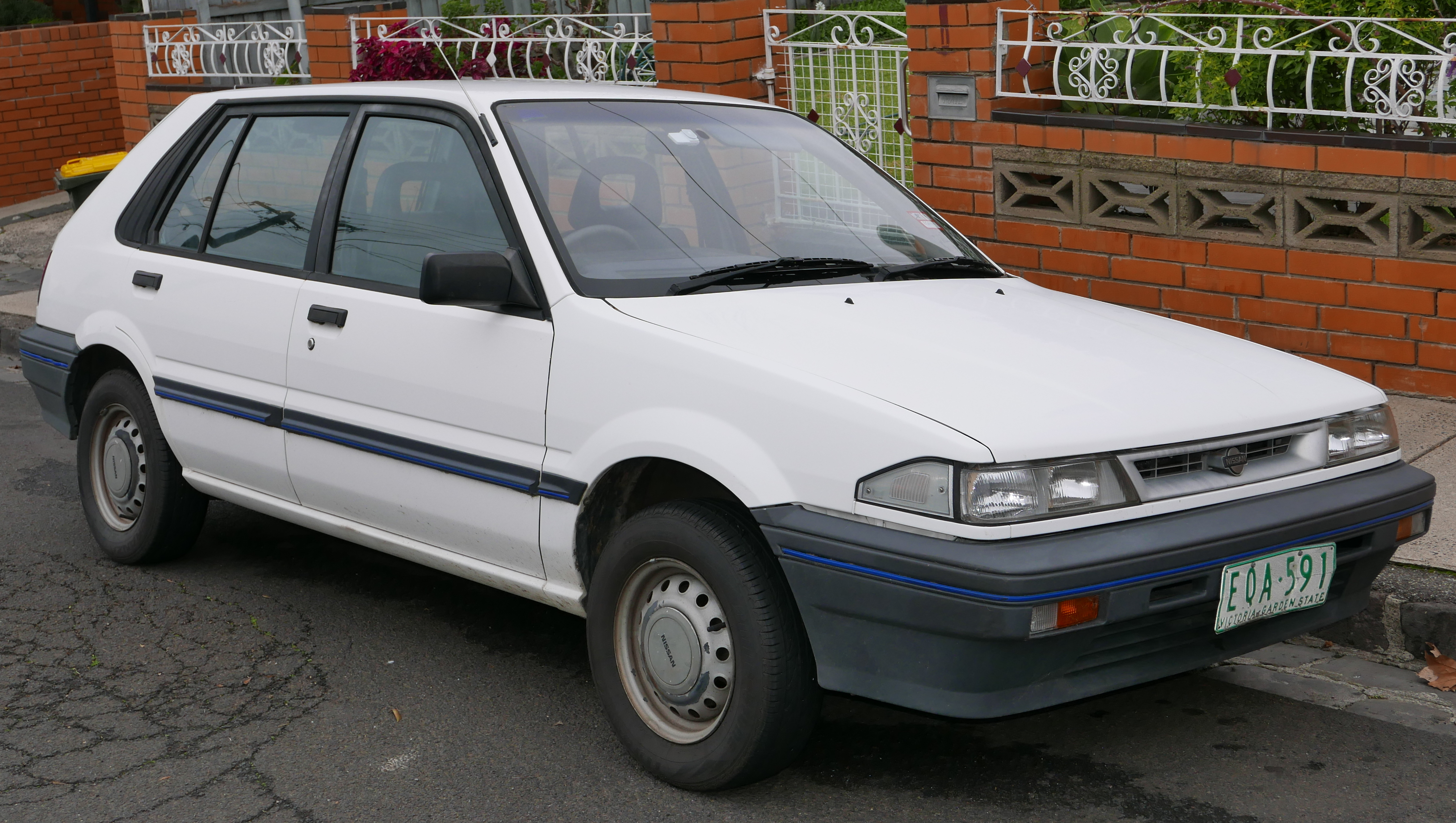
1989–1991 Nissan Pulsar GL 5-door (Australia)

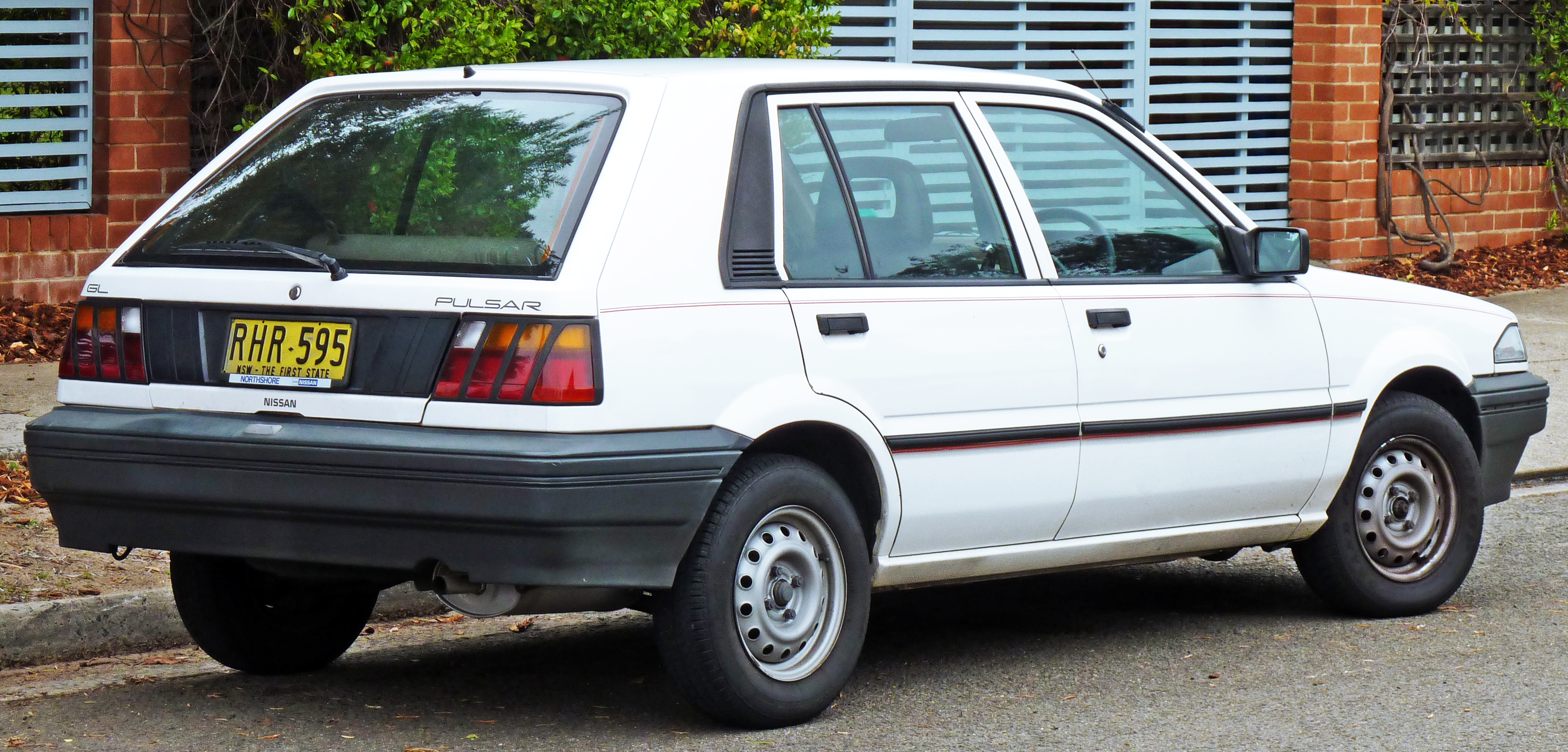
1987–1989 Nissan Pulsar GL 5-door (Australia)

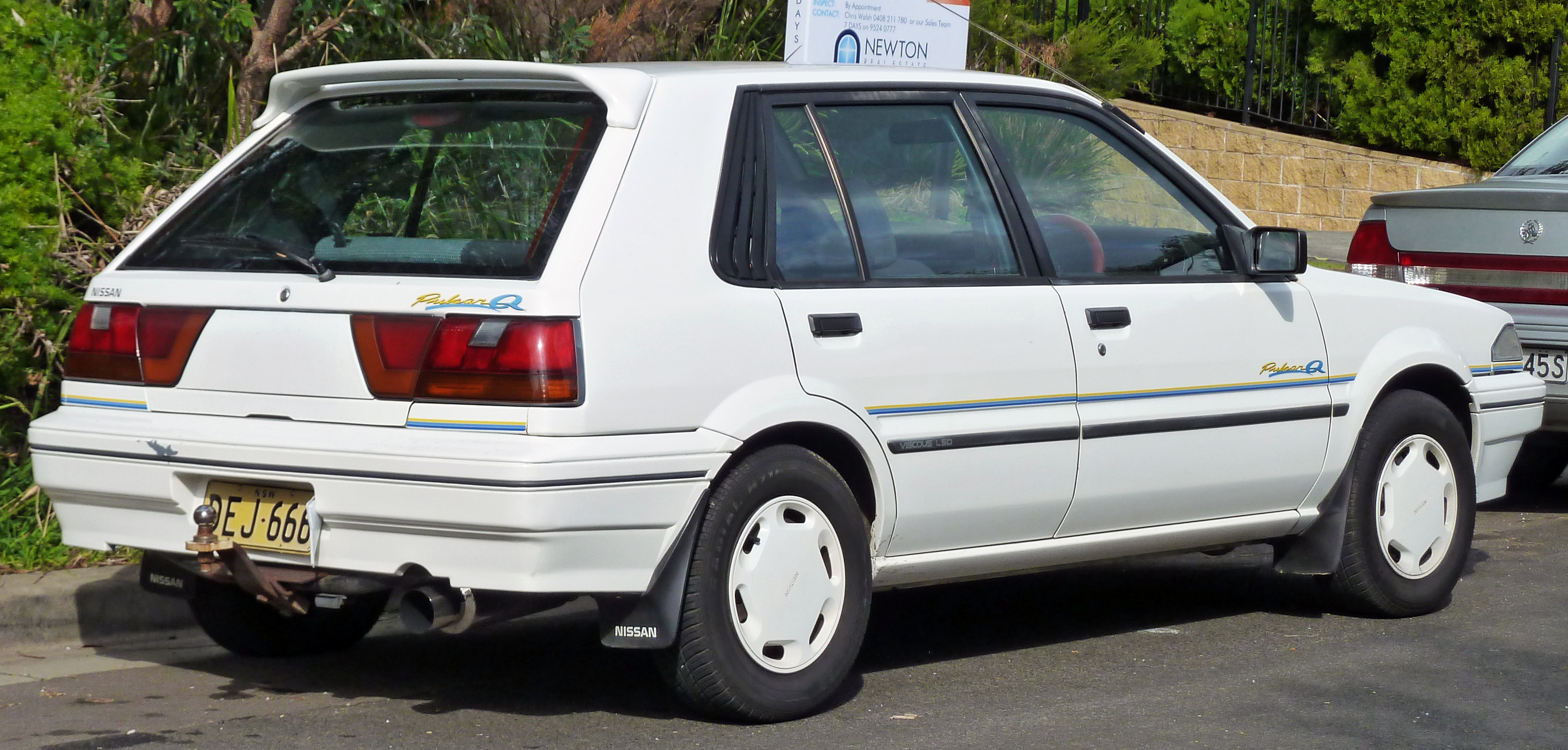
1989–1991 Nissan Pulsar Q 5-door (Australia)

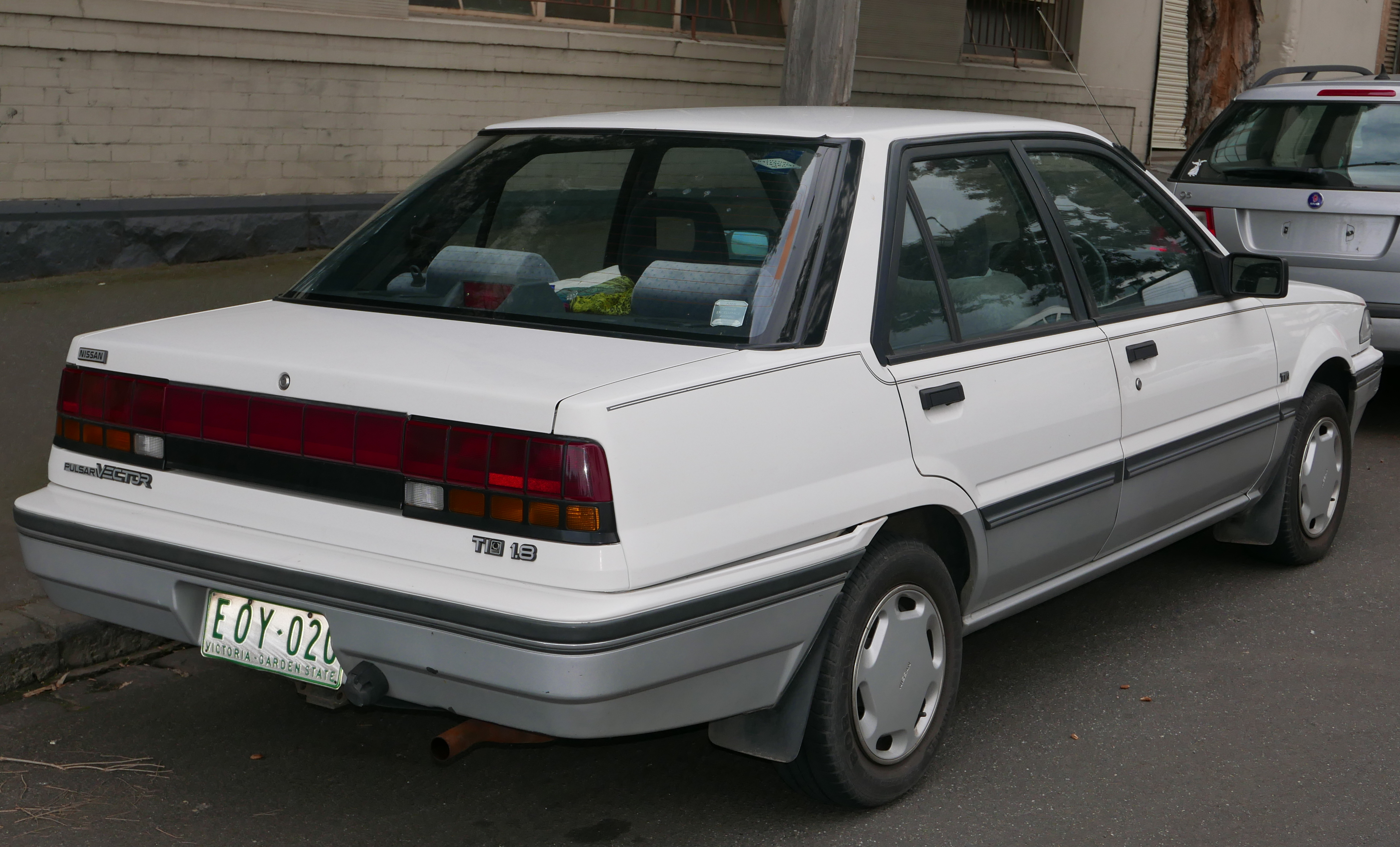
1989–1991 Nissan Pulsar Vector Ti sedan (Australia)

=== Europe ===
In Europe, the N13 Pulsar was usually sold under the Nissan Sunny name - however, this was not the same car as the Nissan Sunny (B12) sold elsewhere around the same time. In Greece the N13 Pulsar retained the Cherry nameplate. Some markets (such as Greece) received a lineup starting with a 1.0-liter engine, but in most countries the 1.3 was at the bottom of the lineup. A carburetted 1.6 was also on offer (fuel injected and catalysed in some countries), as was the 1.7-liter diesel engine. Equipment levels for the non-sporting models were L, LX, SLX and SGX. Four-wheel-drive was also available in the sedan. While the Pulsar was generally sold with Sunny badging in Europe, the Sunny Wagon (B12) was sold as part of the same Sunny family.

The top version, called the Sunny GTi, initially had the 1.6-litre 16-valve engine with 110 PS (81 kW) at 6,400 rpm in the catalysed version. The version sold in countries unencumbered by emissions regulations produces 122 PS (90 kW) at 6,600 rpm. The GTi was quite discreet, with external changes limited to side skirts and small spoilers front and rear, as well as alloy wheels. When introduced, it was not a particularly strong contender in the GTi market; to rectify this Nissan later introduced a more powerful and torquier 1.8-litre version.

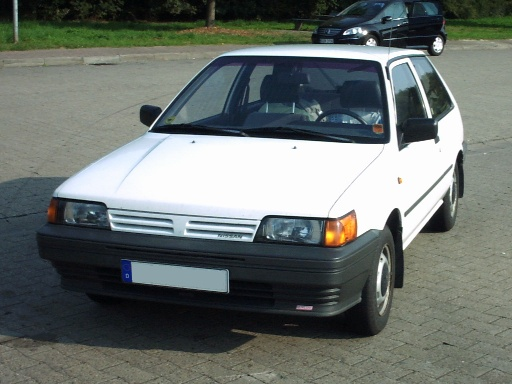
Pre-facelift Nissan Sunny 3-door (Europe)

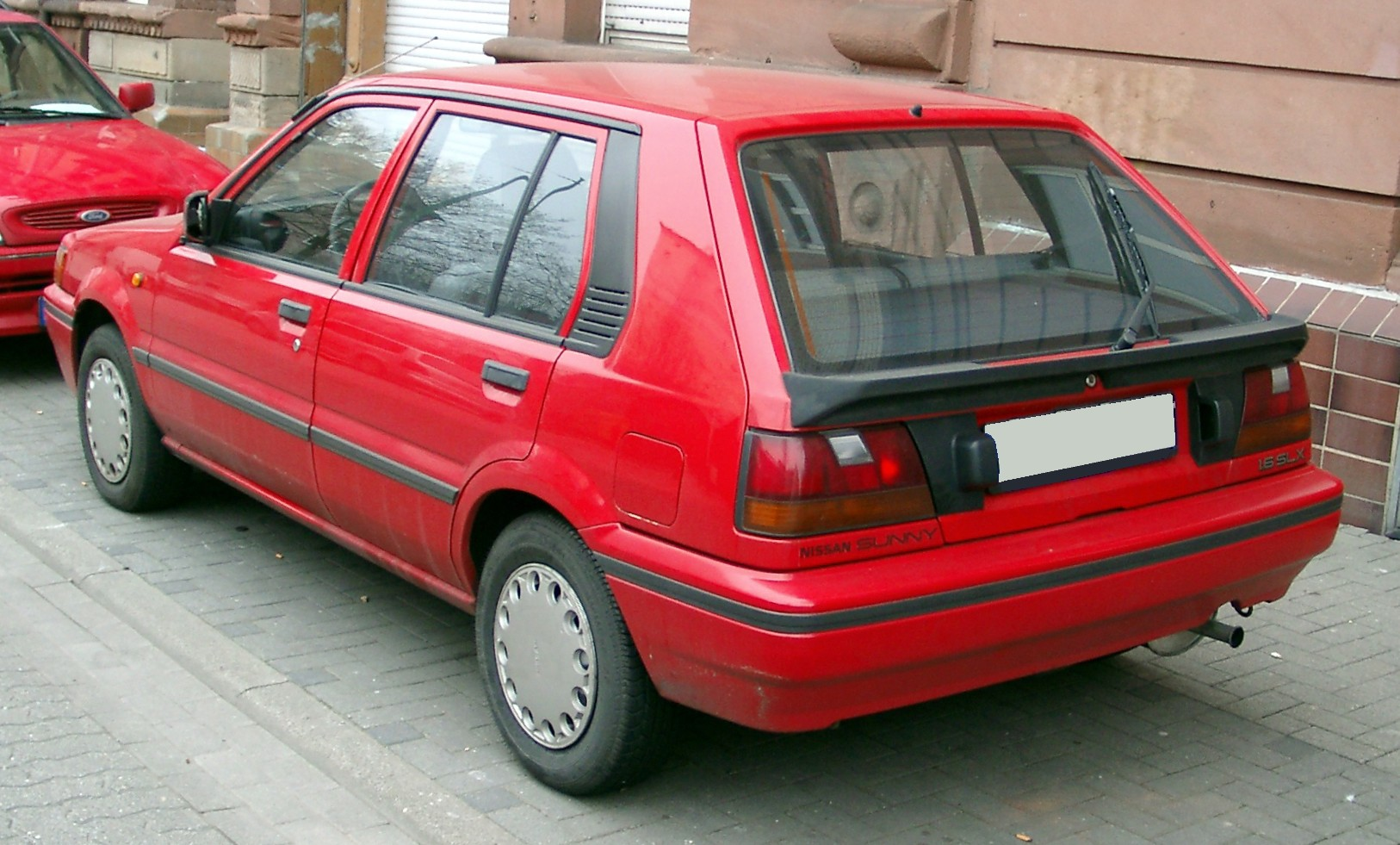
Facelift Nissan Sunny 5-door (Europe)

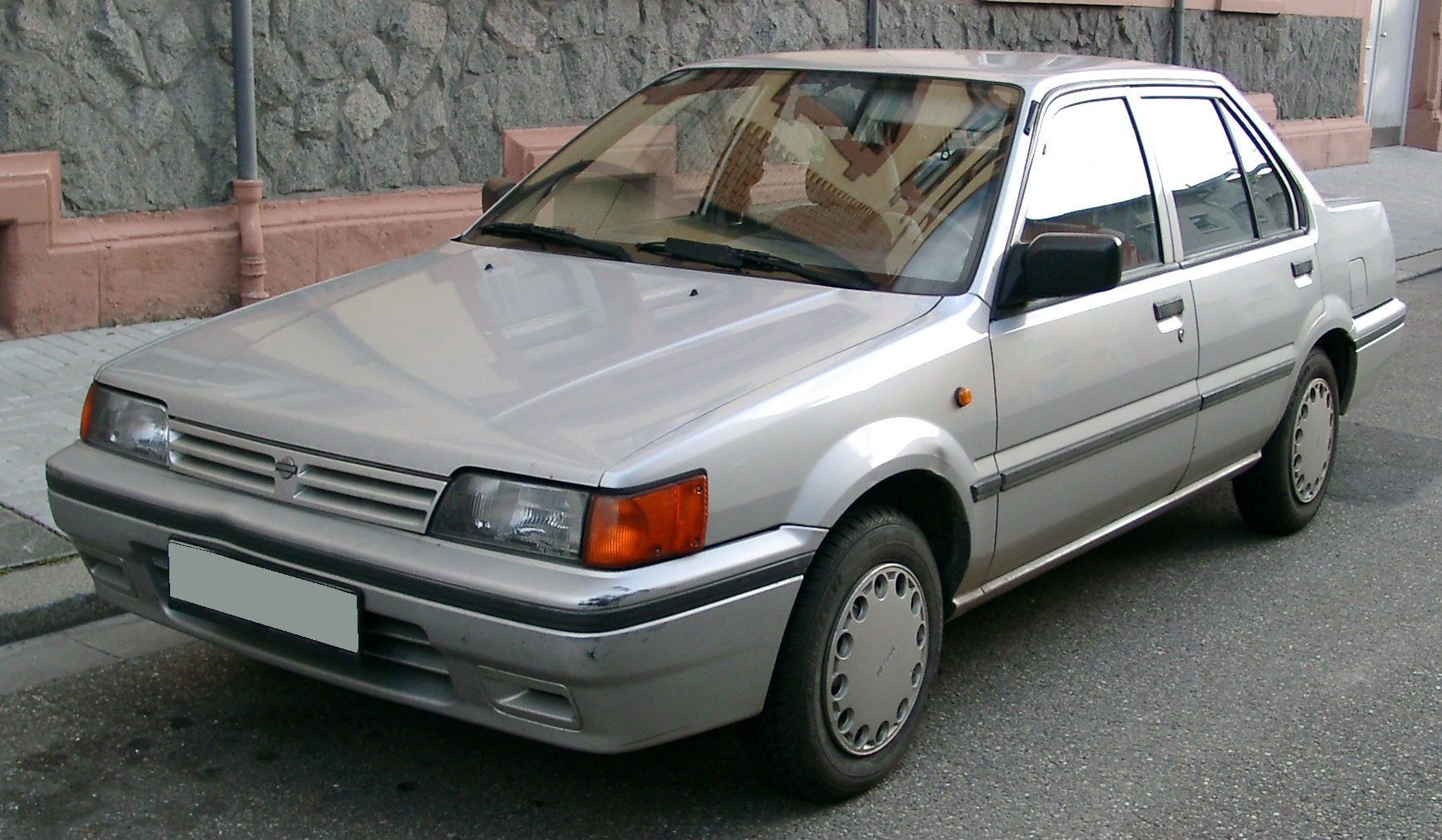
Facelift Nissan Sunny sedan (Europe)

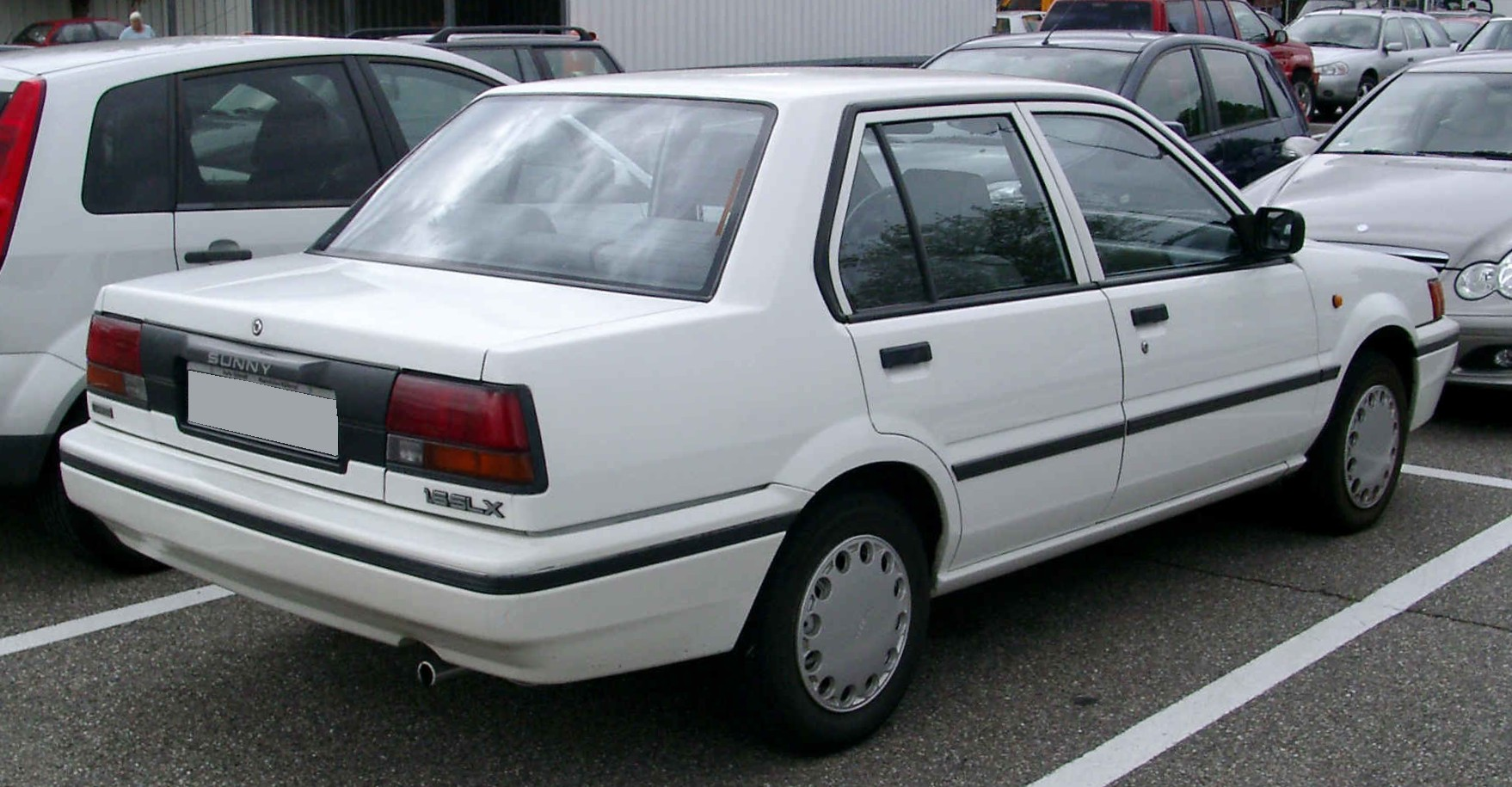
Facelift Nissan Sunny sedan (Europe)

| Engine | Displacement | | Layout | Power | | | | Cat. | Notes |
| Engine | L | cc | Layout | kW | PS | hp | at rpm | Cat. | Notes |
|---|---|---|---|---|---|---|---|---|---|
| E10S | 1.0 | 988 | carb 8V SOHC I4 | 37 | 50 | 49 | 6000 | – | Greece, UK |
| E13S | 1.3 | 1,270 | carb 8V SOHC I4 | 44 | 60 | 59 | 5600 | – | |
| GA14DS | 1.4 | 1,392 | carb 12V SOHC I4 | 59 | 80 | 79 | 6200 | ○ | |
| E16S | 1.6 | 1,597 | carb 8V SOHC I4 | 62 | 84 | 83 | 5600 | – | 4x4 available |
| GA16DS | 1.6 | 1,597 | carb 12V SOHC I4 | 69 | 94 | 93 | 6000 | – | 4x4 available |
| GA16DS | 1.6 | 1,597 | carb 12V SOHC I4 | 64 | 87 | 86 | 6000 | – | Low compression |
| GA16i | 1.6 | 1,597 | TBI 12V SOHC I4 | 66 | 90 | 89 | 6000 | ● | 4x4 available |
| CA16DE | 1.6 | 1,598 | EFI 16V DOHC I4 | 90 | 122 | 120 | 6600 | – | |
| CA16DE | 1.6 | 1,598 | EFI 16V DOHC I4 | 81 | 110 | 108 | 6400 | ● | |
| CA18DE | 1.8 | 1,809 | EFI 16V DOHC I4 | 95 | 129 | 127 | 6400 | – | |
| CA18DE | 1.8 | 1,809 | EFI 16V DOHC I4 | 92 | 125 | 123 | 6400 | ● | |
| CD17 | 1.7 | 1,680 | diesel 8V SOHC I4 | 40 | 55 | 54 | 4800 | – | |

== N14 (1990) ==
N14
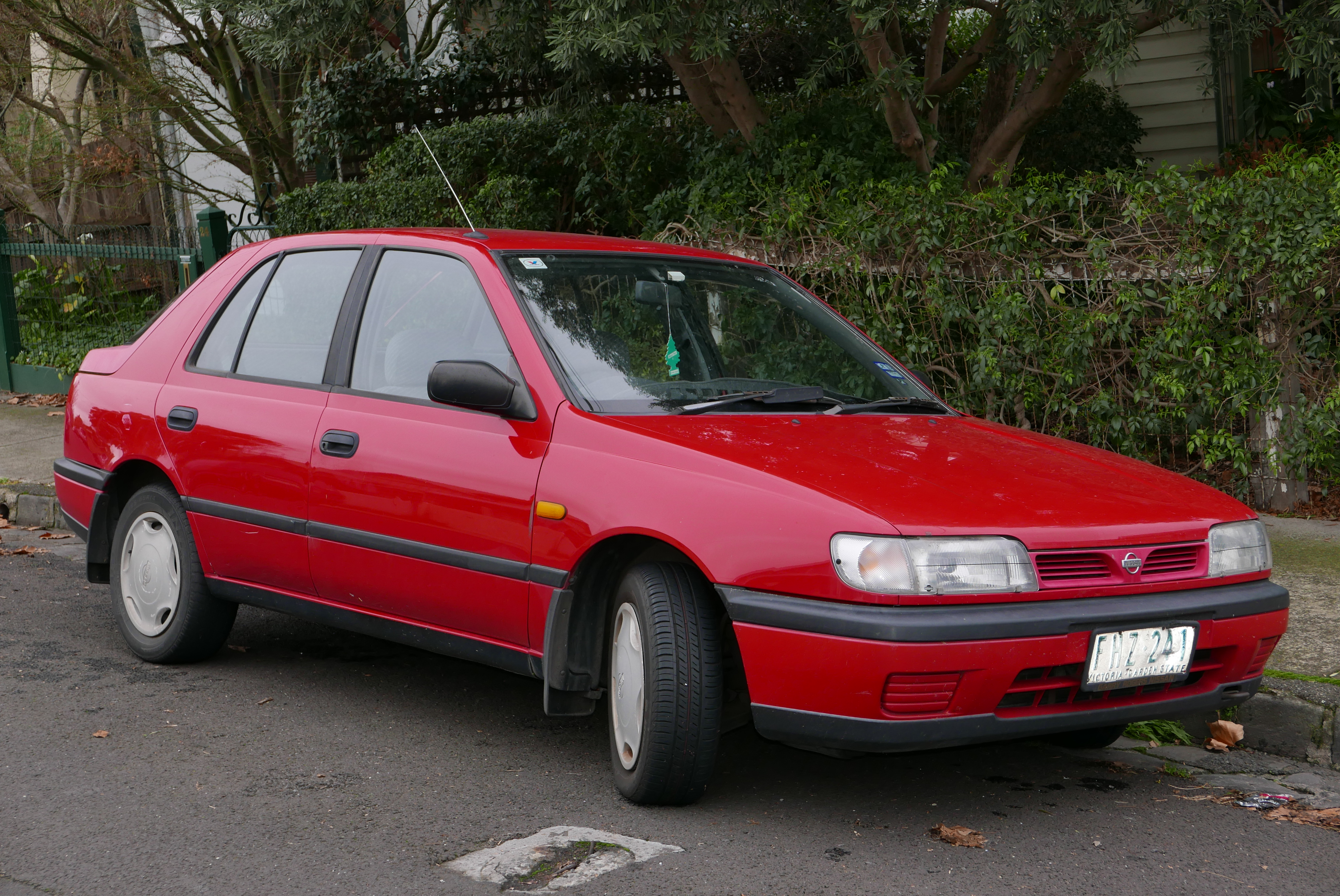
- 1993 Nissan Pulsar LX 5-door (N14, Australia)

Overview
- Also called: Nissan Sentra (New Zealand; South Africa for sedan); Nissan Sabre (South African 5-door hatchback); Nissan Sunny (Europe)
- Production: 1990–1995; 1991–1992 (Australia)
- Assembly: Japan: Oppama Plant, Yokosuka, Kanagawa; Australia: Clayton South, Victoria; Greece: Volos (TEOKAR); New Zealand: Wiri, South Auckland; South Africa: Rosslyn, Gauteng (NSA)
- Designer: Yoshio Maezawa

Body and chassis
- Body style: 3/5-door hatchback 4-door sedan
- Layout: Front-engine, front-wheel-drive Front-engine, all-wheel-drive
- Platform: Nissan B platform
- Related: Nissan AD; Nissan Sentra (B13); Nissan Sunny (B13); Nissan NX

Powertrain
- Engine: petrol: 1.3 L GA13DS I4; 1.4 L GA14DS/GA14DE I4; 1.5 L GA15DS I4; 1.6 L GA16DS/GA16DE/GA16DNE I4; 1.8 L SR18DE I4; 2.0 L SR20DE I4; 2.0 L SR20DET turbo I4; diesel: 1.7 L CD17 I4; 2.0 L CD20 I4

Dimensions
- Wheelbase: 2,430 mm (95.7 in)
- Length: 4,146 mm (163.2 in) (hatch); 4,230 mm (166.5 in) (sedan)
- Width: 1,660 mm (65.4 in)
- Height: 1,400 mm (55.1 in)
- Curb weight: 930 kg (2,050 lb); 1,220 kg (2,690 lb) (GTI-R)

In 1990, the N14 model saw Nissan turn to a more rounded design. The Langley and the Liberta Villa were replaced with the Nissan Primera, assigning the Primera to Nissan Prince Store locations.

This version of the car was launched in the United Kingdom as the Nissan Sunny from March 1991 and was the last generation of Sunny to be sold in Europe, where it was replaced late in 1995 by the Almera. One anomaly from this period resulted from Nissan taking control of its British import and distribution business from Automotive Financial Group (AFG); the acrimonious split between Nissan and Octav Botnar resulted in AFG sourcing the vehicle badged as the Pulsar and selling it concurrently in the UK alongside the "official" version (badged as the Sunny) by the newly established Nissan Motor GB. The European top-of-the-line model was the 2.0 GTI, equipped with the naturally aspirated SR20DE engine with 143 PS (105 kW) rather than the 1.8-litre version used in the home market. While powerful, the Sunny GTI was better equipped and more cosseting than its in-class competitors, with more sedate handling as well.

This version continued to be offered in CKD kit form in New Zealand as the Sentra (unrelated to the version sold in North America). In Europe, the Sunny name continued, applied to three-door hatchback, five-door hatchback and four-door sedan models, alongside the separate model line Sunny California station wagon from Japan (called either the Sunny Estate or Sunny Traveller). This was the last generation of the Pulsar (now with Sunny badges, as in the rest of Europe) to be assembled in Greece, where TEOKAR went out of business in April 1995.

There was no N14 Pulsar offered in the United States or Canada either. Instead, the North American Pulsar for those markets evolved into what was known as the NX1600. The NX cars are coupés sharing the same chassis, engines, body electronics, and even dashboard with the Pulsar N14.

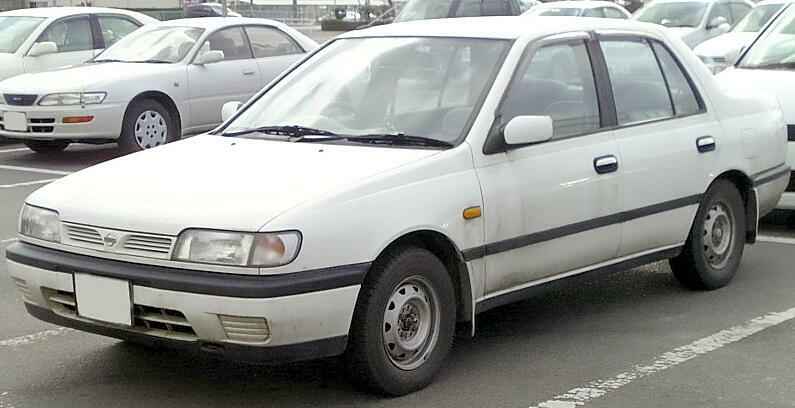
Pulsar Sedan (JDM)

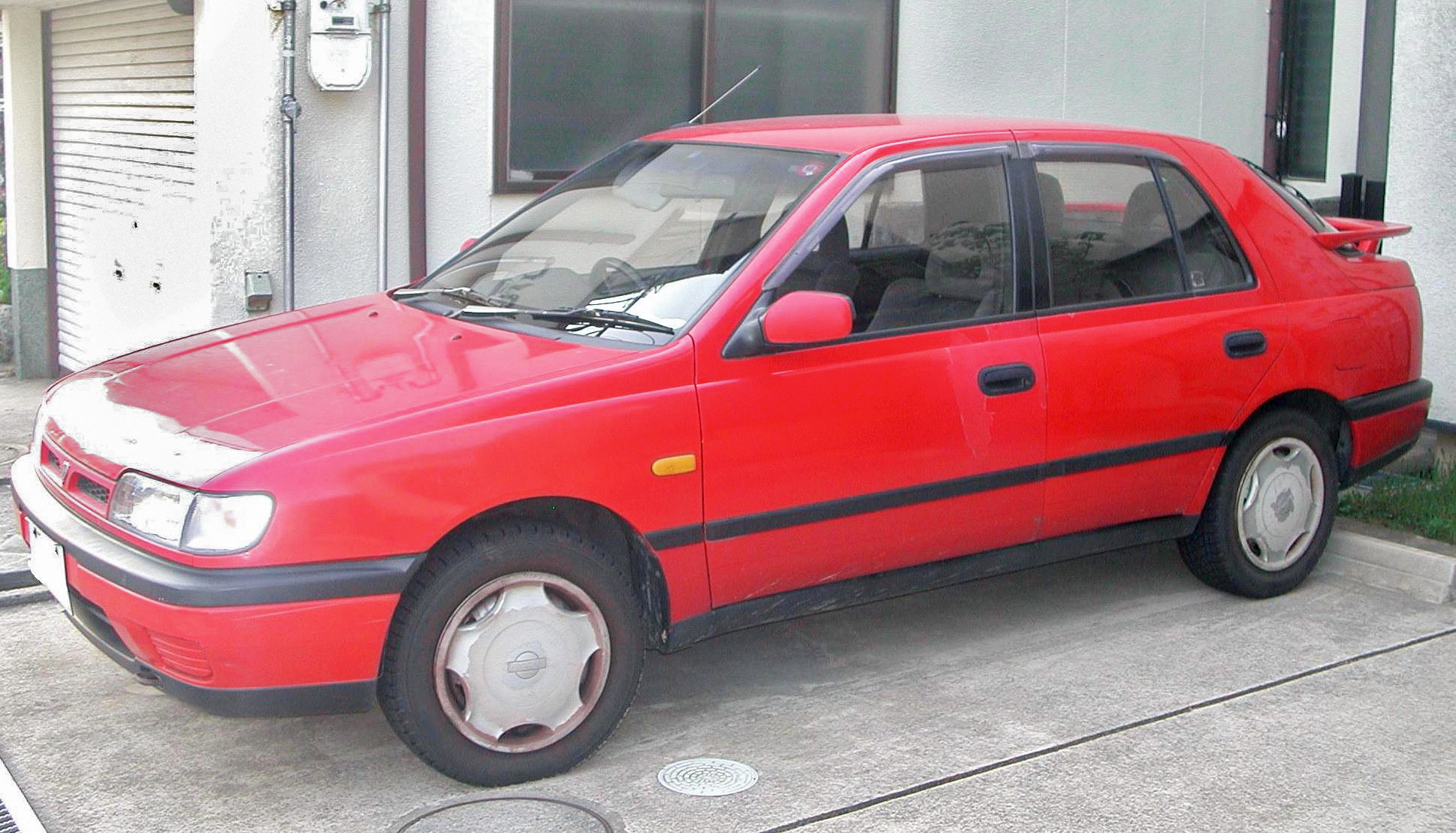
Pulsar X1R five-door (JDM)

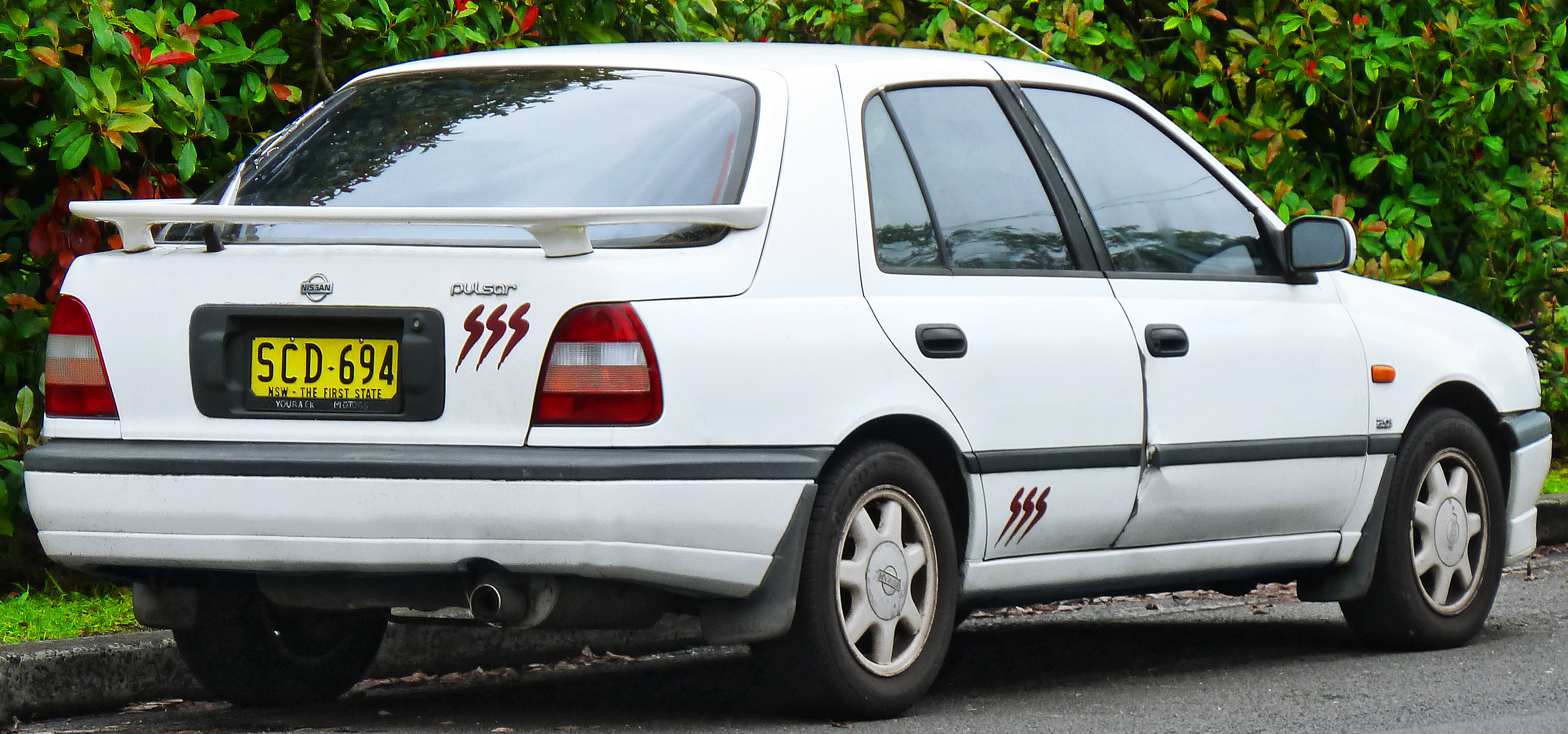
1991–1993 Pulsar SSS 5-door (Australia)

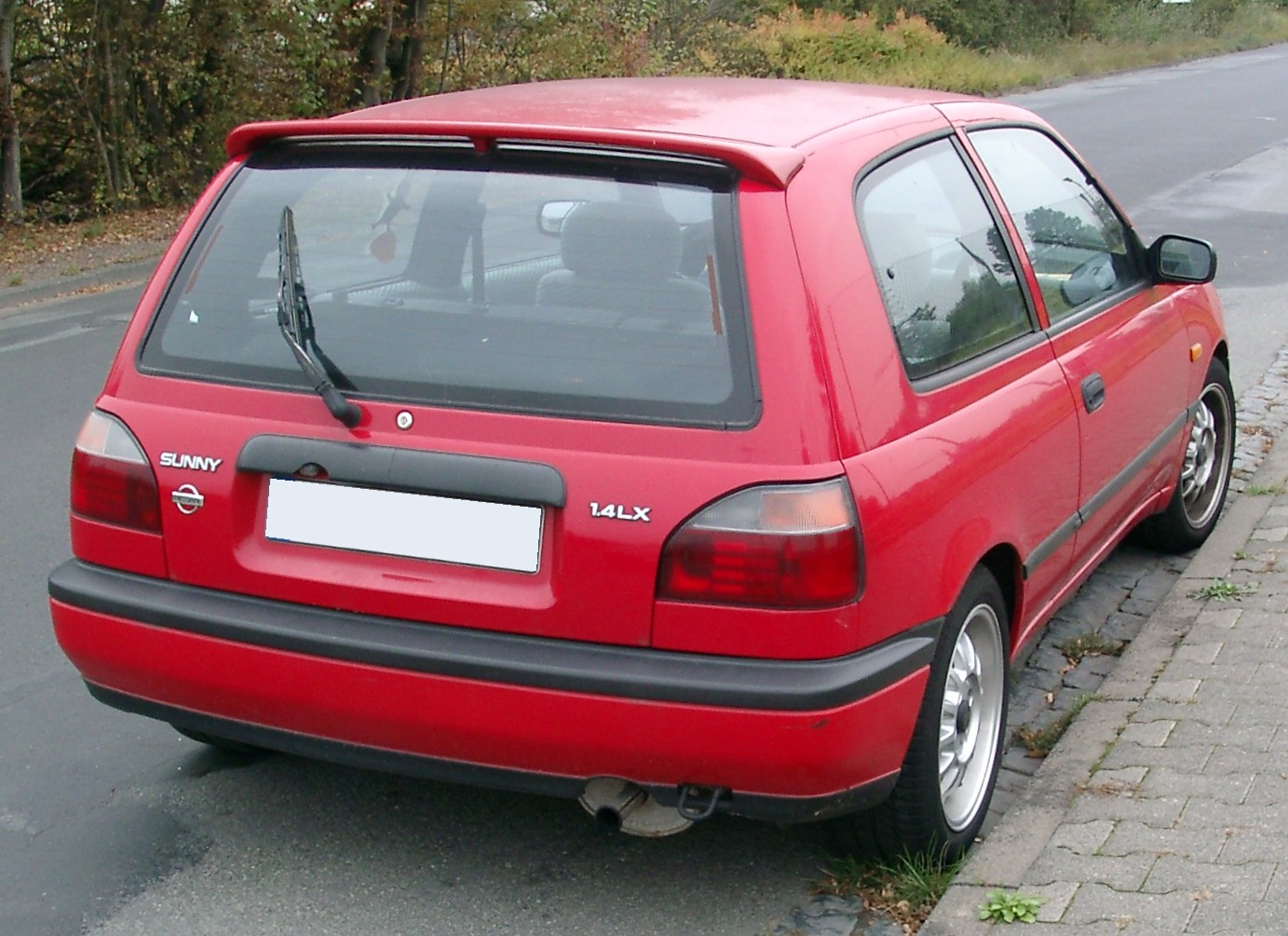
Sunny three-door (Europe)

=== Marketing ===
Japan

In Japan, the N14 range was large, comprising eight different models with a total of eighteen available variations, including six different engines, three body shapes, and two drivetrains.

- GA13DS 1,295 cc (1.3 L; 79.0 cu in), 79 PS (58 kW; 78 hp) at 6,000 rpm, 10.6 kg⋅m (104 N⋅m; 77 lb⋅ft) at 3,600 rpm
- GA15DS 1,497 cc (1.5 L; 91.4 cu in), 94 PS (69 kW; 93 hp) at 6,000 rpm, 12.8 kg⋅m (126 N⋅m; 93 lb⋅ft) at 3,600 rpm
- GA16DE 1,596 cc (1.6 L; 97.4 cu in), 110 PS (81 kW; 108 hp) at 6,000 rpm, 15 kg⋅m (147 N⋅m; 108 lb⋅ft) at 4,000 rpm
- SR18DE 1,838 cc (1.8 L; 112.2 cu in), 140 PS (103 kW; 138 hp) at 6,400 rpm, 17 kg⋅m (167 N⋅m; 123 lb⋅ft) at 4,800 rpm
- SR20DET 1,998 cc (2.0 L; 121.9 cu in), 230 PS (169 kW; 227 hp) at 6,400 rpm, 29 kg⋅m (284 N⋅m; 210 lb⋅ft) at 4,800 rpm
- CD17 1,680 cc (1.7 L; 102.5 cu in), 55 PS (40 kW; 54 hp) at 4,800 rpm, 10.6 kg⋅m (104 N⋅m; 77 lb⋅ft) at 2,800 rpm

| Model | Engine | Drivetrains | Bodies |
|---|---|---|---|
| V1 | GA13DS | FWD | 3 or 4 door |
| M1 | GA15DS or CD17 | FWD or 4WD | 3 or 4 door |
| K1 | GA15DS or CD17 | FWD or 4WD | 4 or 5 door |
| J1J | GA15DS | FWD | 4 door |
| X1 | GA15DS | FWD or 4WD | 3 door |
| X1R | GA16DE | FWD | 3, 4 or 5 door |
| GTI | SR18DE | FWD | 3, 4 or 5 door |
| GTI-R | SR20DET | 4WD | 3 door |

Australia

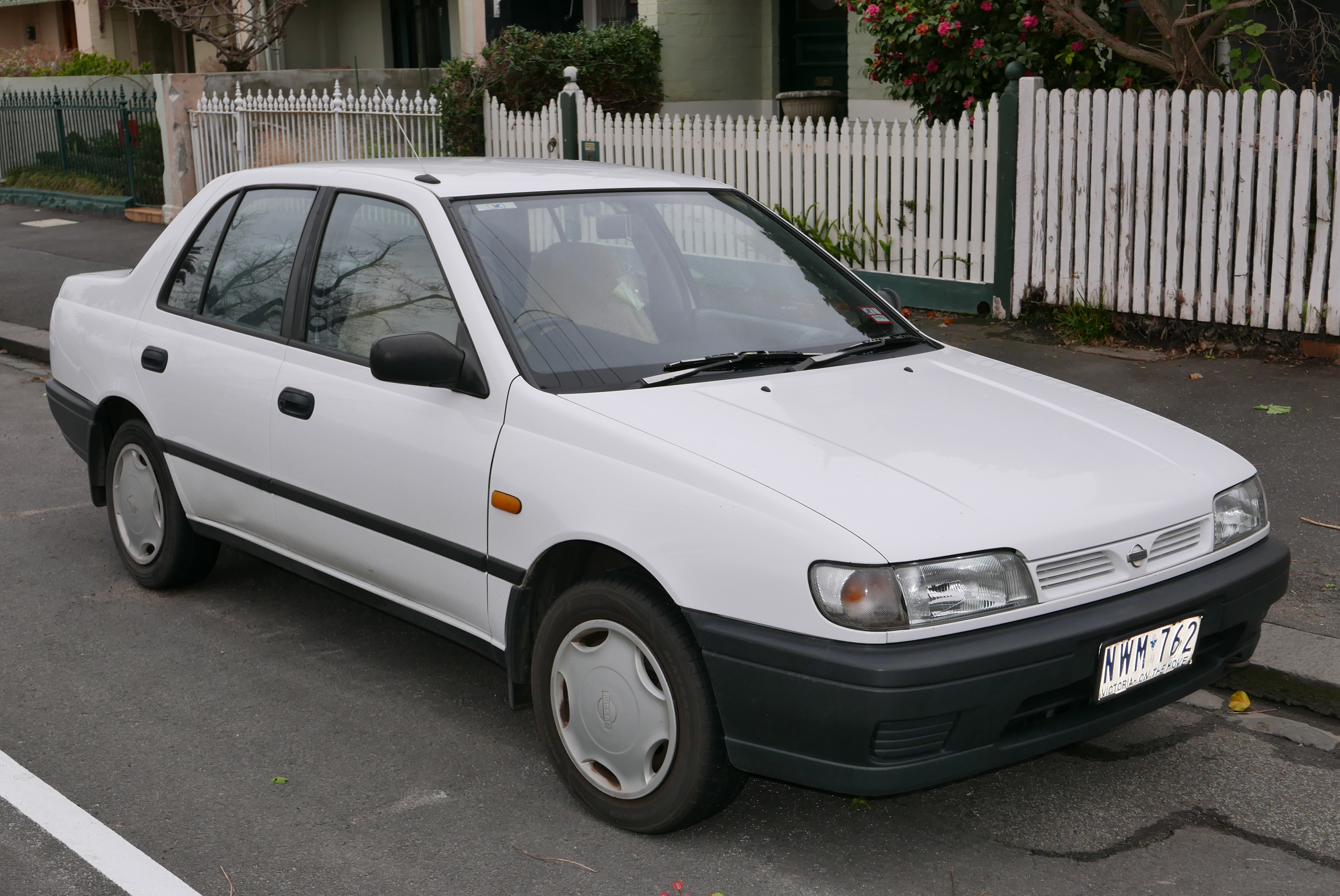
1995 Nissan Pulsar LX Limited sedan (Australia)

In Australia, the N14 (aka ES) was available in four-door sedan and five-door hatchback. Nissan Australia assembled the range that sold from October 1991 to February 1993 at their factory in Clayton South, Victoria. Similar models with unique specifications and Sentra badging were shipped to New Zealand where a wagon version, sourced from Japan and assembled locally, was also offered. After Nissan closed the Clayton South plant in October 1992 for financial reasons, the models (known as the "Series 2") were imported from Japan and sold in Australia until September 1995, while Nissan NZ imported its own versions in CKD form to sell alongside the locally assembled wagon until the plant in Wiri, South Auckland, shut down in 1998. Unlike the N13 Pulsar/Astra, Holden in Australia did not use a variant of this Pulsar, instead choosing to use a rebadged variant of the rival Toyota Corolla, which they sold as the Holden Nova until the late 1990s when they reintroduced the Astra name for their variant of the Opel Astra. The Pulsar N14 was awarded Australian Wheels magazine's Car of the Year in 1991, an honor it shared with the Honda NSX.

- GA14DS 1,392 cc (1.4 L; 84.9 cu in), 75 PS (55 kW; 74 hp) at 6,000 rpm, 11.4 kg⋅m (112 N⋅m; 82 lb⋅ft) at 4,000 rpm (NZ Only)
- GA16DE 1,596 cc (1.6 L; 97.4 cu in), 110 PS (81 kW; 108 hp) at 6,000 rpm, 15 kg⋅m (147 N⋅m; 108 lb⋅ft) at 4,000 rpm
- SR20DE 1,998 cc (2.0 L; 121.9 cu in), 143 PS (105 kW; 141 hp) at 6,400 rpm, 18 kg⋅m (177 N⋅m; 130 lb⋅ft) at 4,800 rpm

| Model | Bodies | Engine | Years |
|---|---|---|---|
| GLi | 4 or 5 door | GA16DE | 1991-1993 |
| LX | 4 or 5 door | GA16DE | 1993-1995 |
| Solaire | 4 or 5 door | GA16DE | 1994-1995 |
| Q | 5 door | GA16DE or SR20DE (option) | 1991-1995 |
| TI | 4 or 5 door | GA16DE or SR20DE (option) | 1991-1995 |
| SSS | 5 door | SR20DE | 1991-1995 |

Europe

Sold as the Sunny in the Europe from February 1991, the N14 was fitted with different engines from their Japanese counterparts, to better suit local regulations and markets. The AD Van (Y10) was sold as the Sunny Wagon, with the 1.6-litre petrol or 2.0-litre diesel engines, with entirely different sheetmetal. Four-wheel-drive was available on the 1.6-liter Wagon and four-door sedan versions as well as the turbocharged GTi-R (introduced in June 1991). With the introduction of stricter, Europe-wide emissions standards (Euro 1) in 1992, the uncatalyzed versions were generally discontinued. The range was lightly facelifted in February 1993, at which time fuel injected versions of the 1.4 and 1.6 were also introduced. The four-wheel-drive versions switched to the fuel injected engine; the 4WD sedan was discontinued in mid-1994.

The N14 Sunny was generally discontinued by September 1995, as the new Almera replaced it. The Y10-based Sunny Traveller/Wagon continued to be on offer in an dwindling number of markets until 2000 since there was no Almera wagon on offer. The Sunny Wagon received light changes in April 1996.

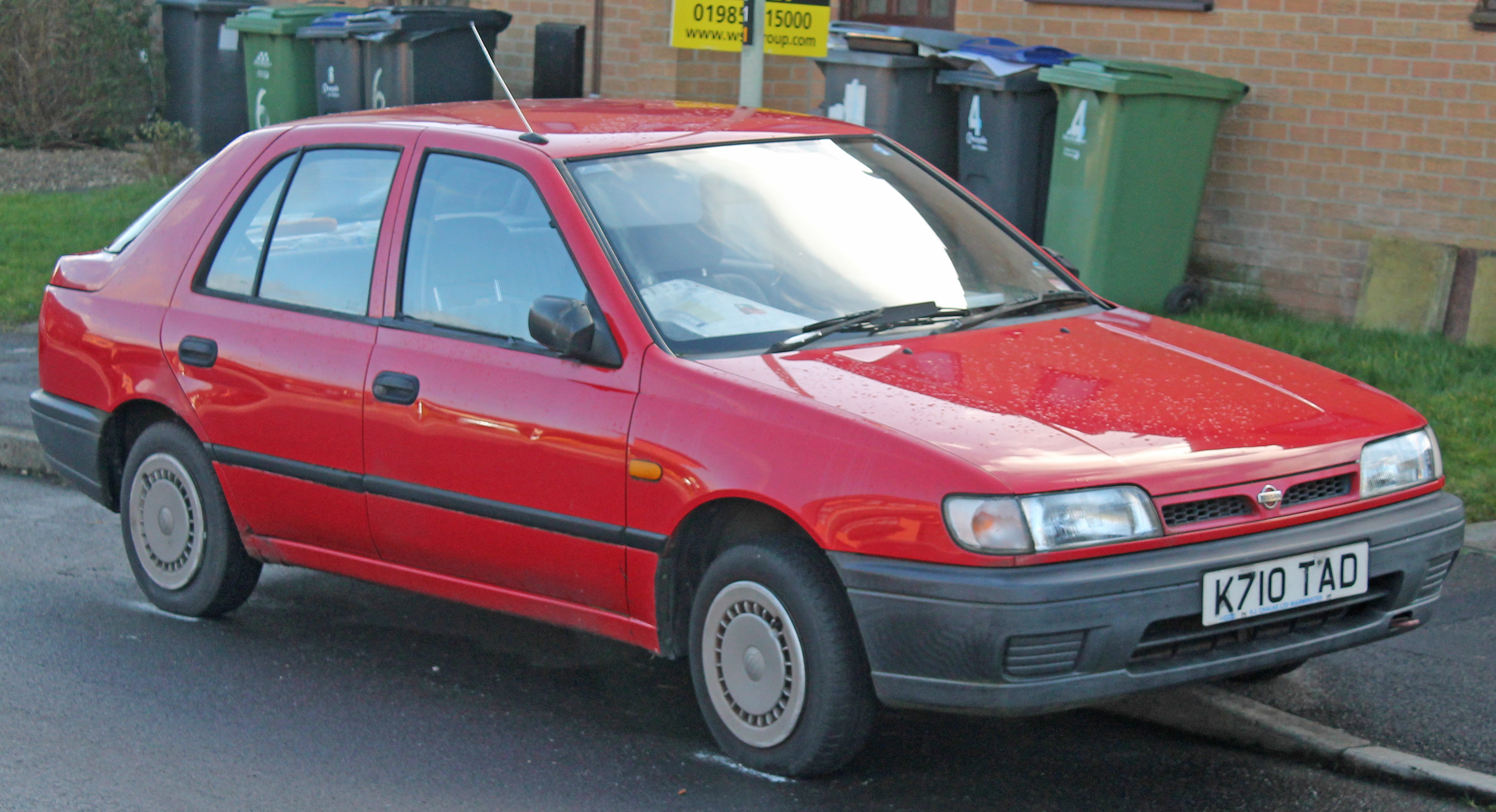
Sunny five-door (Europe)

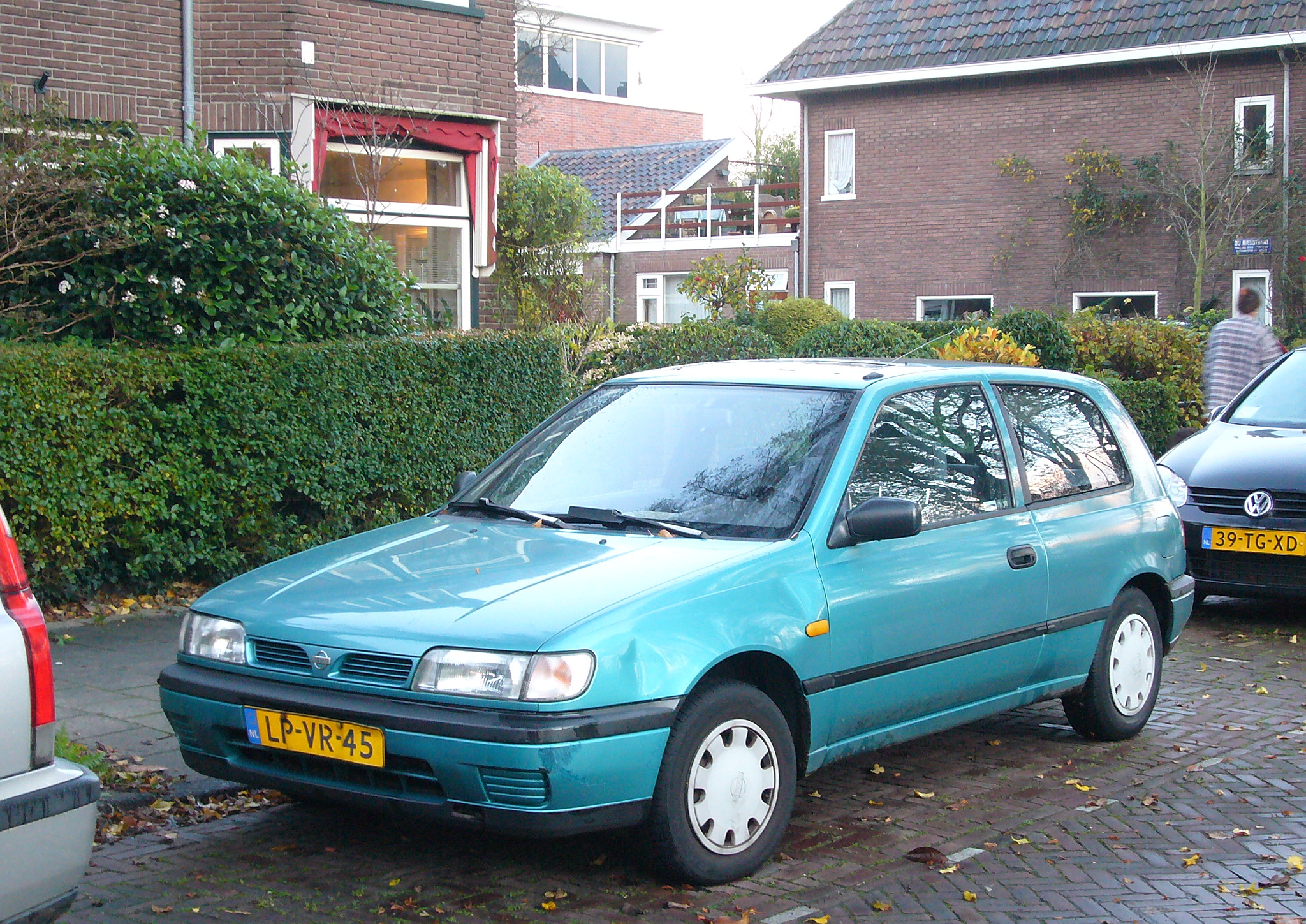
Sunny three-door (Europe)

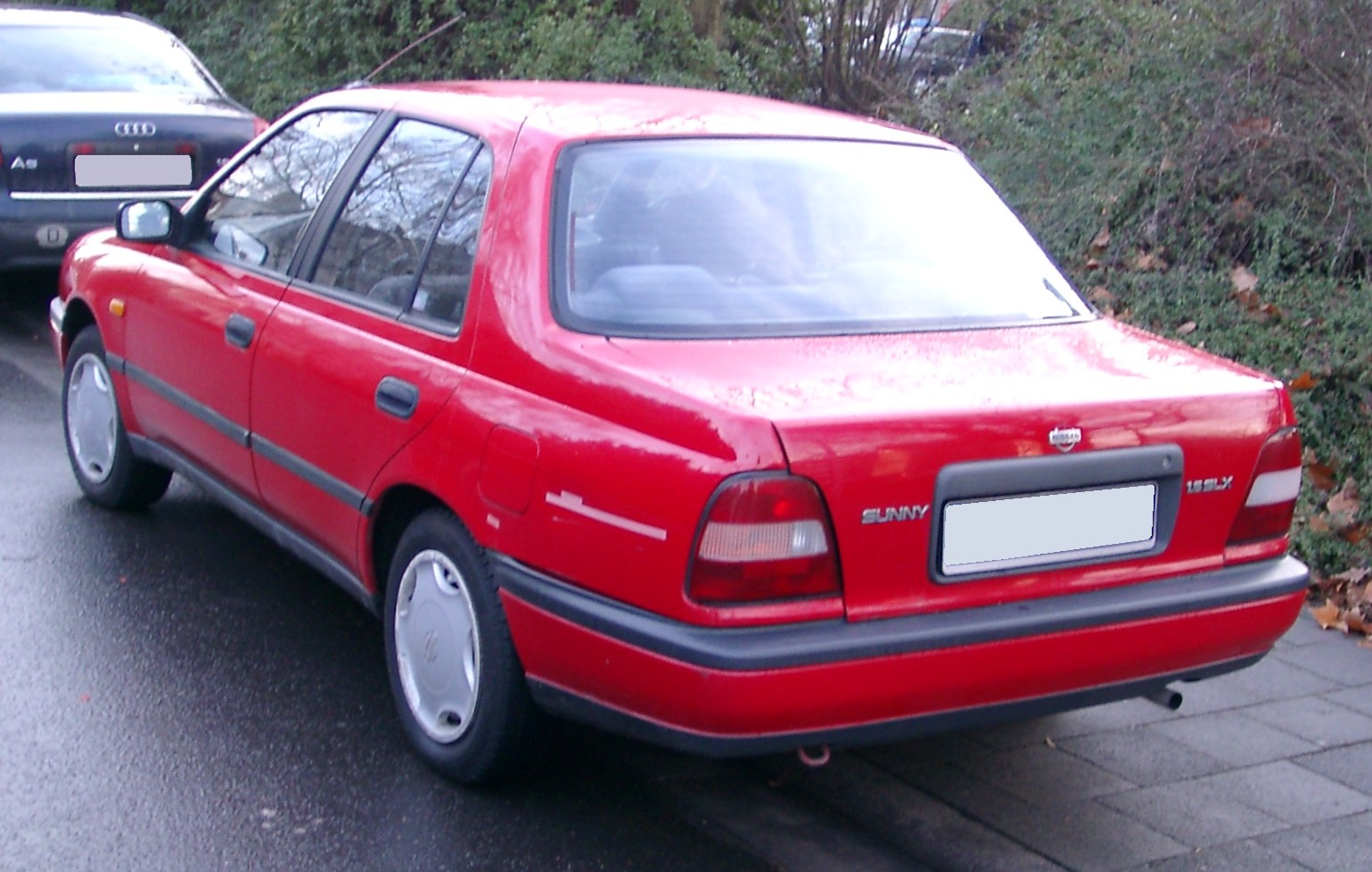
Sunny sedan (Europe)

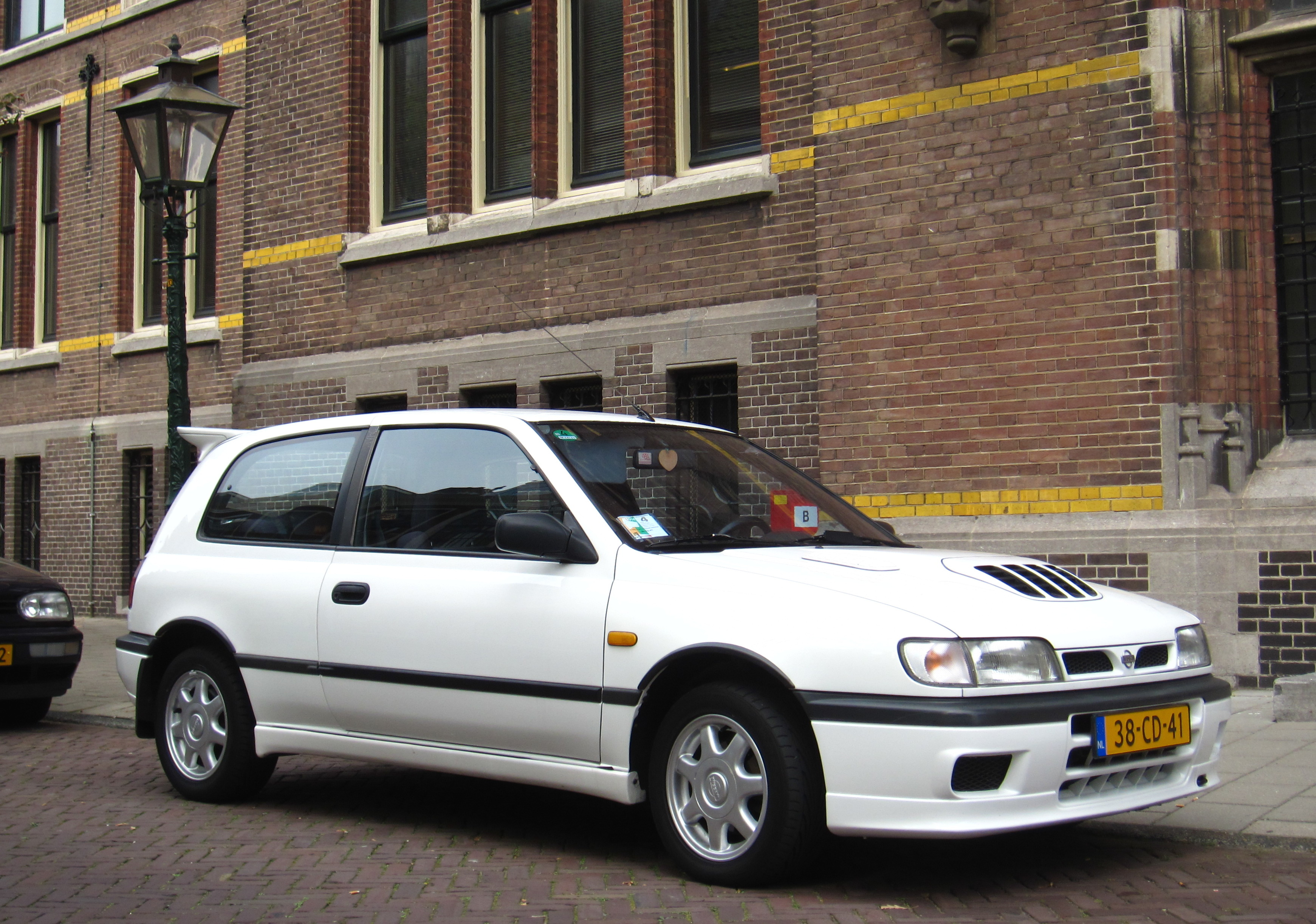
The Sunny GTi-R was sold in Europe in 1991 and 1992

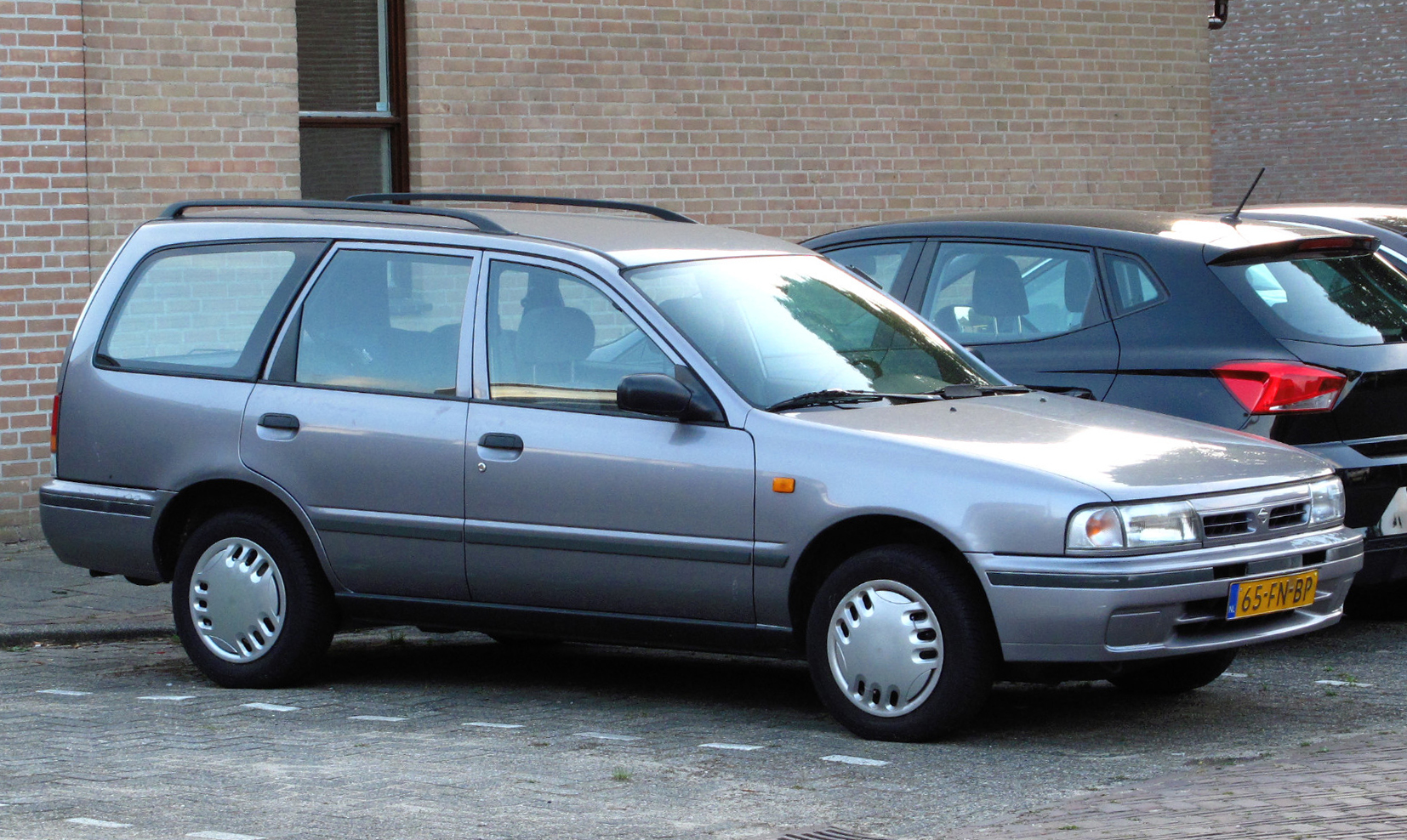
The Nissan AD-based Sunny Traveller/Wagon continued to be sold until 2000

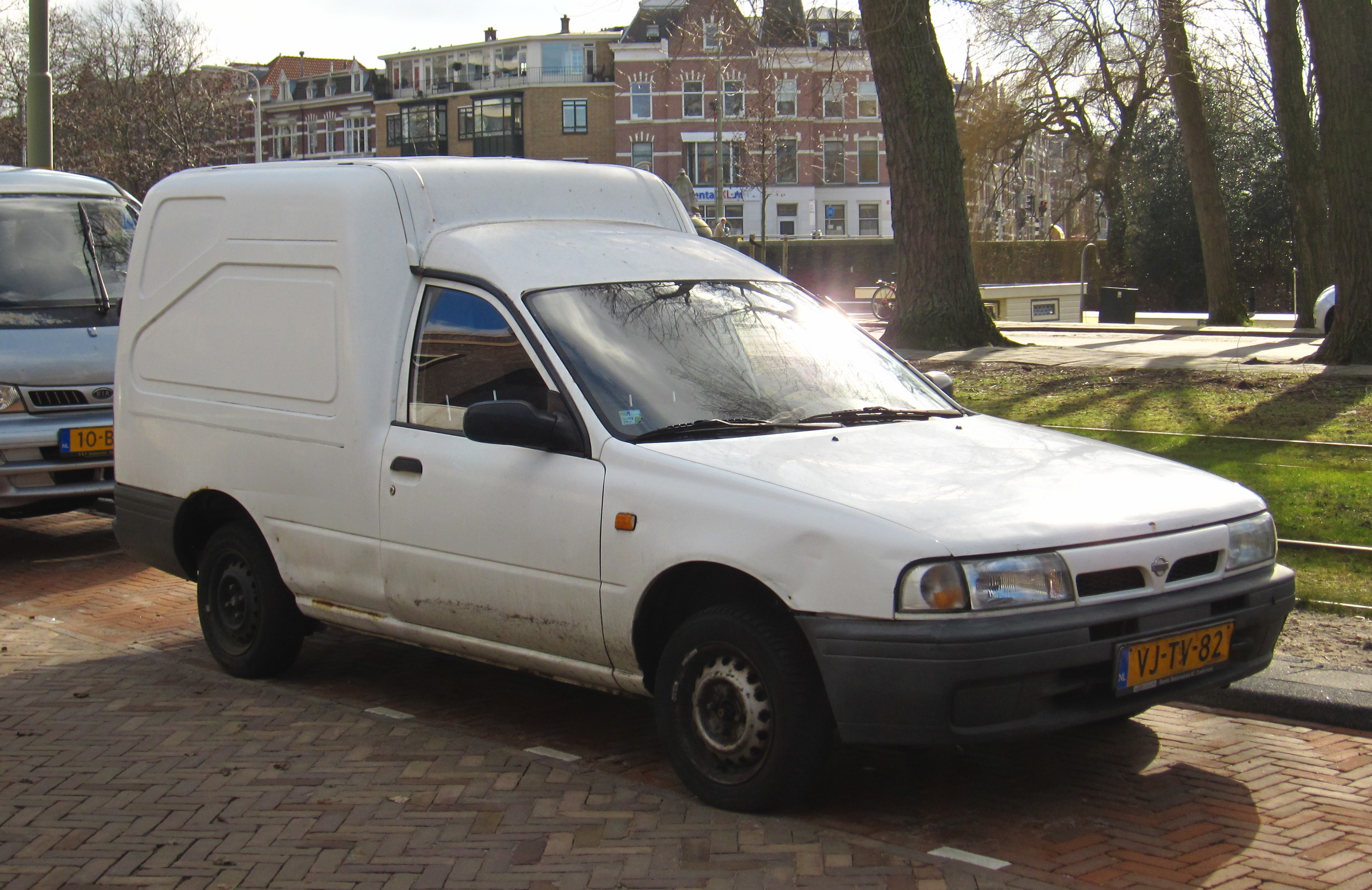
The AD box vans were also sold with "Sunny" badging in Europe

| Engine | Displacement | | Layout | Power | | | | Cat. | Years | Notes |
| Engine | L | cc | Layout | kW | PS | hp | at rpm | Cat. | Years | Notes |
|---|---|---|---|---|---|---|---|---|---|---|
| GA14DS | 1.4 | 1,392 | carb 16V DOHC I4 | 63 | 86 | 85 | 6000 | – | 1991–1992 | Some sources state 82 PS |
| GA14DS | 1.4 | 1,392 | carb 16V DOHC I4 | 55 | 75 | 74 | 6000 | ● | 1991–1995 | |
| GA14DE | 1.4 | 1,392 | EFI 16V DOHC I4 | 64 | 87 | 86 | 6000 | ● | 1993–1995 | |
| GA16DS | 1.6 | 1,596 | carb 16V DOHC I4 | 70 | 95 | 94 | 6000 | – | 1991–1992 | |
| GA16DS | 1.6 | 1,596 | carb 16V DOHC I4 | 66 | 90 | 89 | 6000 | ● | 1991–1995 | until 2000 in the Wagon |
| GA16DE | 1.6 | 1,596 | EFI 16V DOHC I4 | 75 | 102 | 101 | 6000 | ● | 1993–1995 | until 1996 in the Wagon |
| SR20DE | 2.0 | 1,998 | EFI 16V DOHC I4 | 105 | 143 | 141 | 6400 | ○ | 1991–1995 | GTi; un-catalyzed version has identical power figures |
| SR20DET | 2.0 | 1,998 | EFI turbo 16V DOHC I4 | 162 | 220 | 217 | 6400 | ● | 1991–1992 | GTi-R |
| CD20 | 2.0 | 1,973 | diesel SOHC I4 | 55 | 75 | 74 | 4800 | – | 1991–1995 | until 2000 in the Wagon |

South Africa

Facelift Nissan Sabre 200 GXi (South Africa)

In South Africa the N14 (aka ES) was built locally by Nissan South Africa. It was only available with FWD as a four-door sedan (badged Sentra) and five-door hatchback (badged Sabre). Originally released in 1994 and given a cosmetic facelift in 1997 rather than being replaced with the N15, it was produced until 2000 and was also exported to Namibia.

- 160 GX – GA16DS – 1,596 cc (1.6 L; 97.4 cu in), 99 PS (73 kW; 98 hp) at 6000 rpm, 15 kg⋅m (147 N⋅m; 108 lb⋅ft) at 4000 rpm
- 160 GXi – GA16DNE – 1,596 cc (1.6 L; 97.4 cu in), 110 PS (81 kW; 108 hp) at 6000 rpm, 15 kg⋅m (147 N⋅m; 108 lb⋅ft) at 4000 rpm
- 200 GXi – SR20DE – 1,998 cc (2.0 L; 121.9 cu in), 143 PS (105 kW; 141 hp) at 6400 rpm, 18 kg⋅m (177 N⋅m; 130 lb⋅ft) at 4800 rpm

=== GTI-R ===
The N14 series also saw the introduction of the GTI-R three-door hatchback (sold in Japan as a Pulsar with chassis code E-RNN14, and sold in Europe as a Sunny with chassis code EGNN14). This was a homologation variant produced between 1990 and 1994 in order to enter the WRC under Group A rules. It featured a turbocharged 2.0-litre SR20DET engine producing 169 kW (230 PS; 227 hp) and 29 kg⋅m (280 N⋅m; 210 lb⋅ft). The body is largely the same as the standard N14 three-door model, but distinguished by the large rear wing and bonnet scoop. It has an ATTESA all-wheel drive system and a unique variant (coded 54C) of the SR20DET engine. With a power-to-weight ratio of 0.083 weighing 1,220 kg (2,690 lb) and all-wheel-drive, the standard GTI-R is able to accelerate from 0–100 km/h in 5.4 seconds, cover the standing quarter-mile in 13.5 seconds, and reach a (manufacturer claimed) top speed of 232 km/h (144 mph).

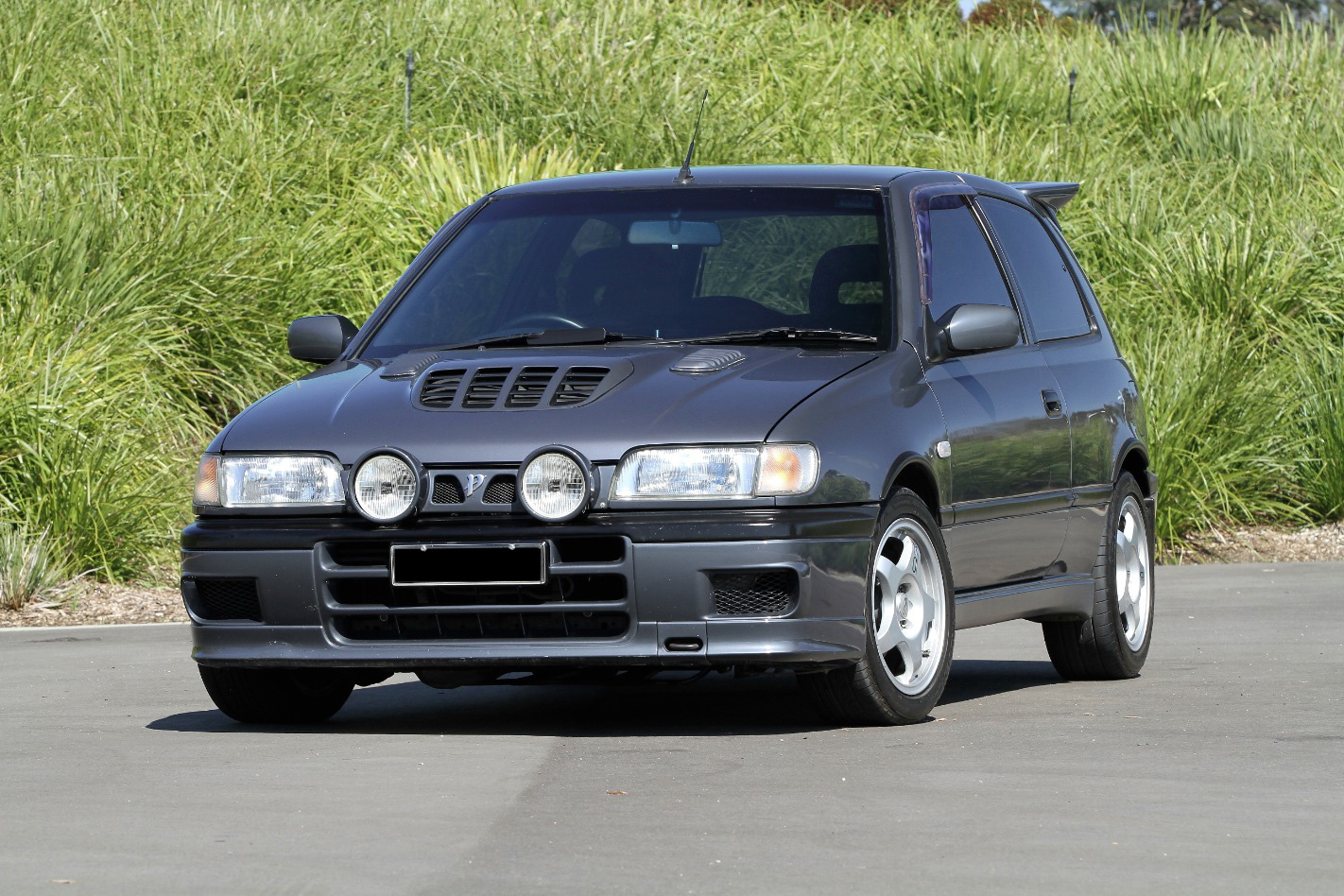
Nissan Pulsar GTI-R (Japan)

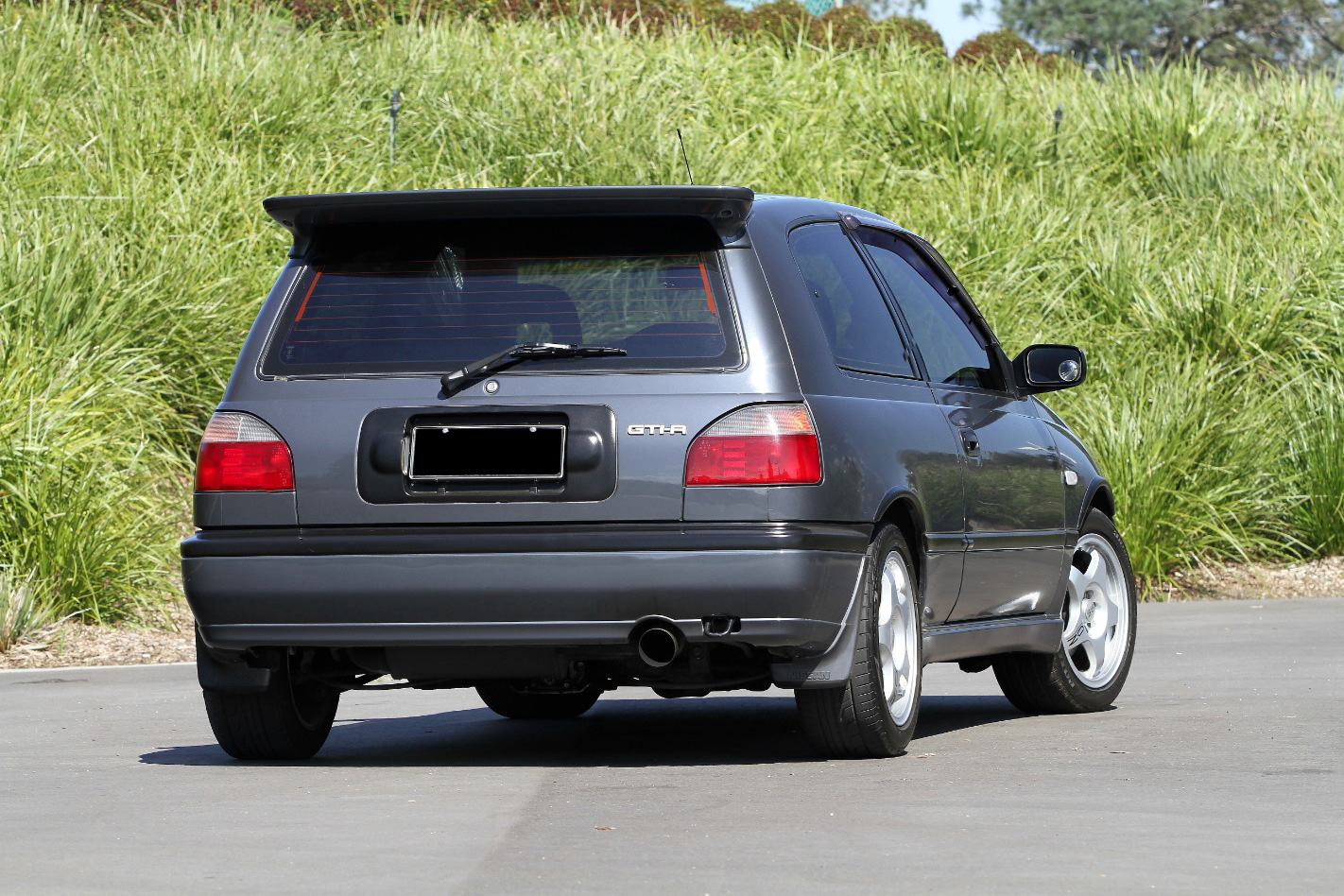
Nissan Pulsar GTI-R (Japan)

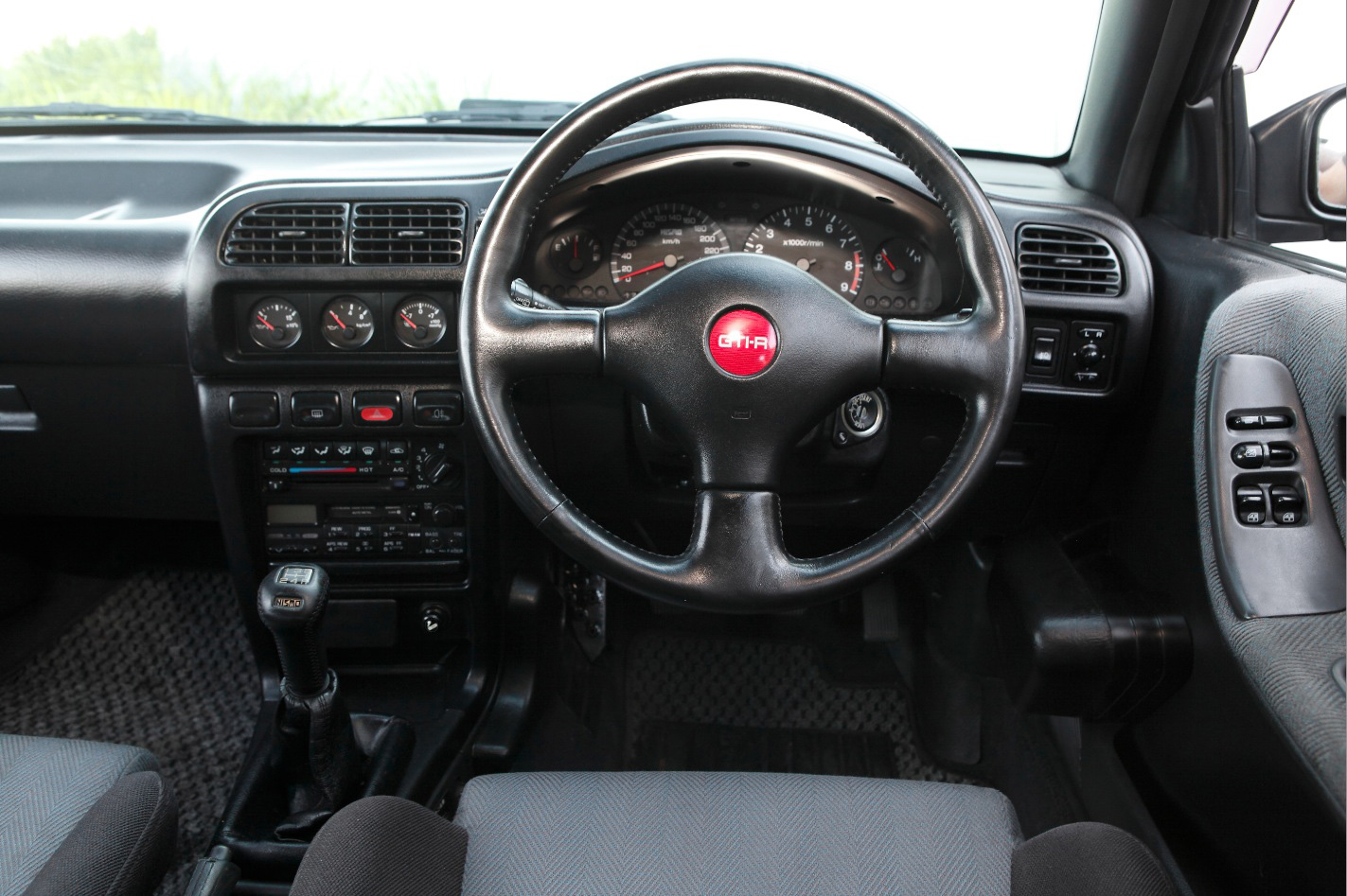
Nissan Pulsar GTI-R (Japan) Series 1

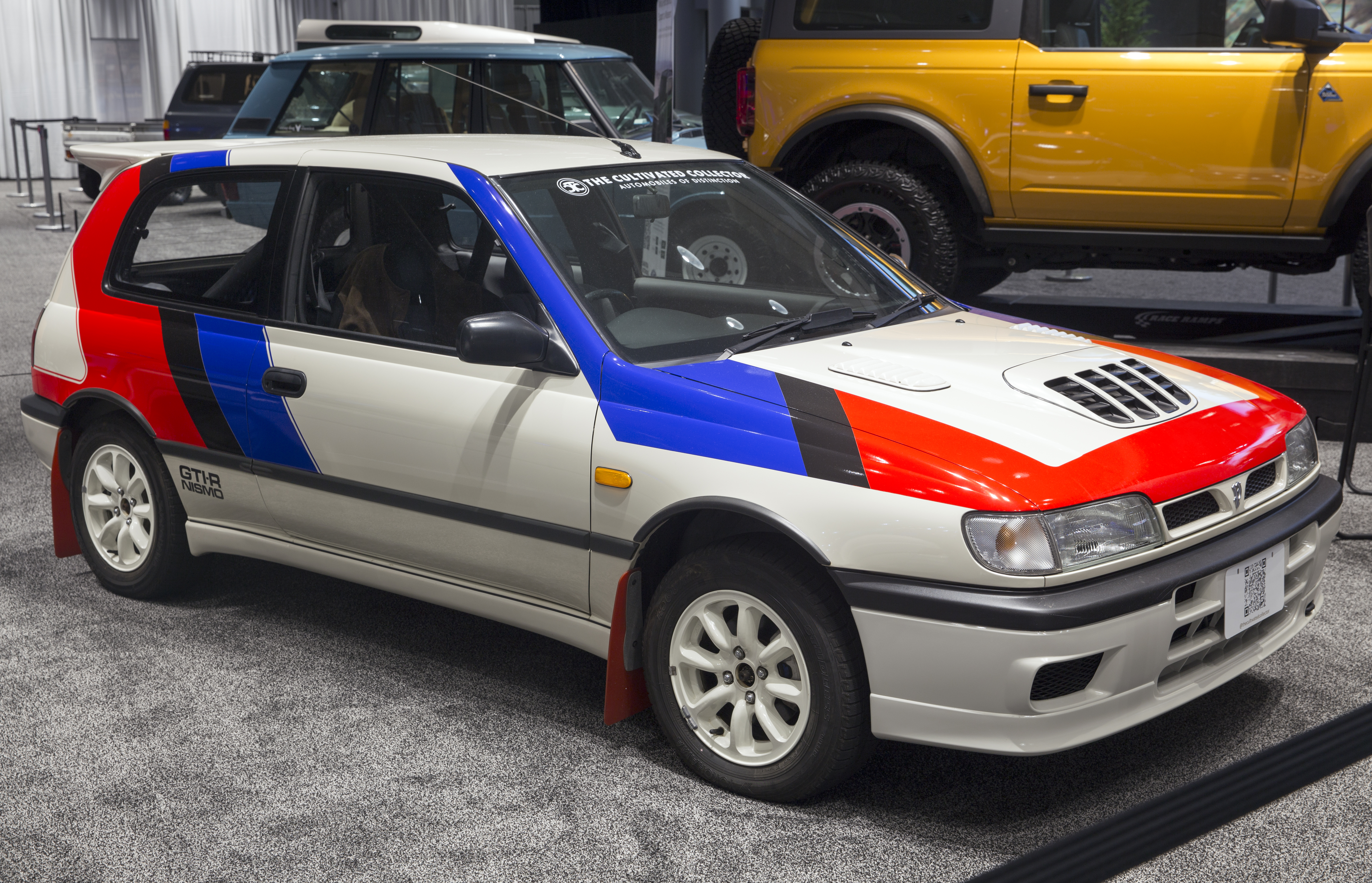
Nissan Pulsar GTI-R NISMO

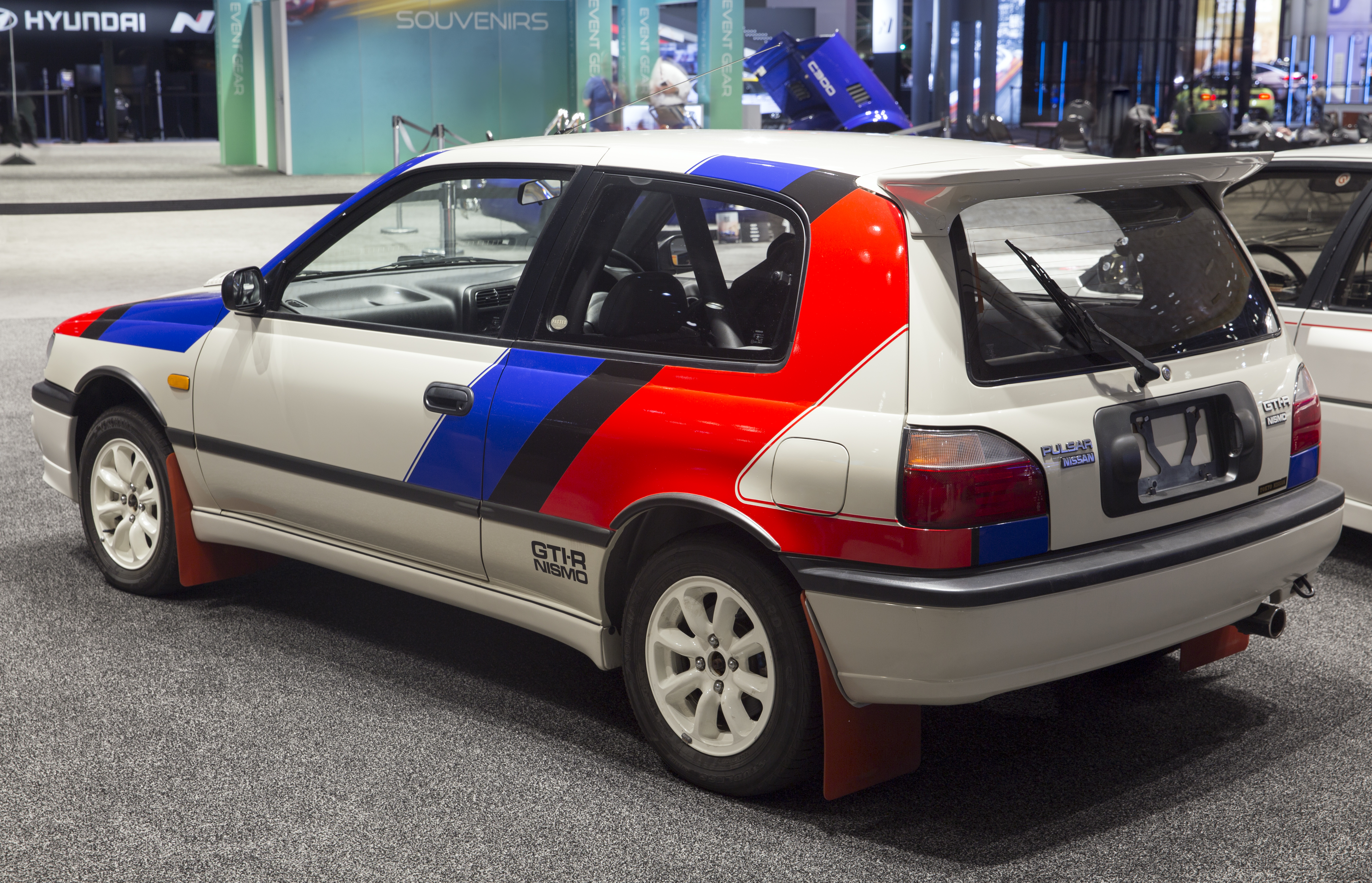
Nissan Pulsar GTI-R NISMO

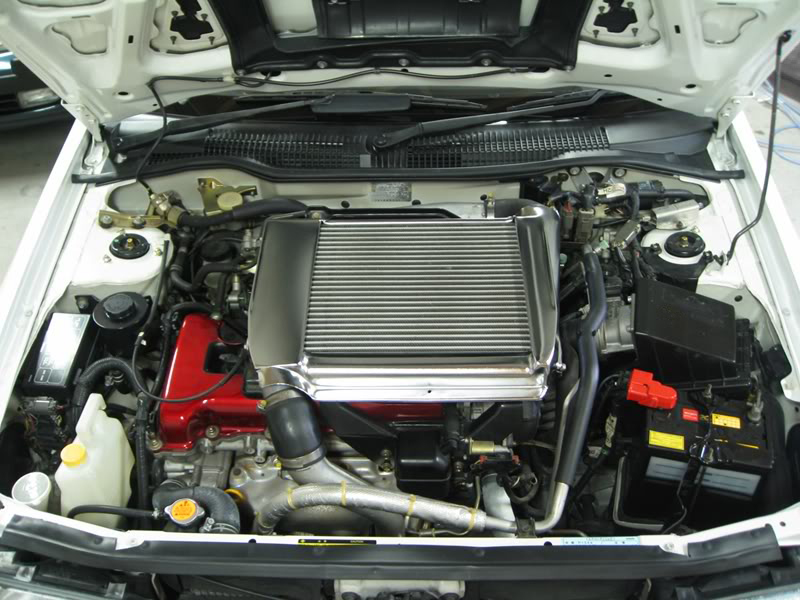
Nissan Pulsar GTI-R (Japan)

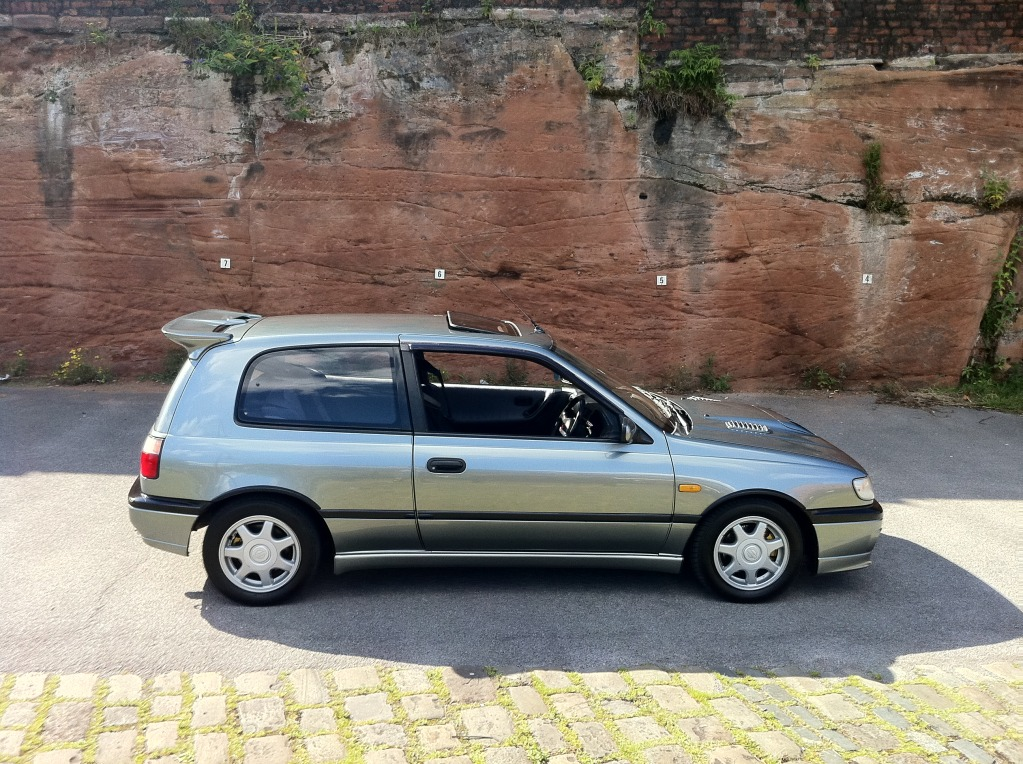
Nissan Pulsar GTI-R (Japan) DL2

==== Models ====
There were several different models of the GTI-R sold to the general public, identifiable by the model number found on the VIN plate located on the firewall in the engine bay.

- GTI-RA: Model number EBYNRVFN14T******* (aka RA / Alpha / Road / Luxury). This was the normal road car, which came standard with air conditioning, power windows and mirrors, and ABS. Roughly halfway through the production (August 1992), Nissan made a range of cosmetic changes to the interior of the RA model (mostly replacing trim that was unique to the GTI-R with trim that was common to other models in the N14 range). Although not advertised or branded as such, they were extensive enough (around 10 items) to be noticeable as a different phase or series, and are defined by chassis numbers RNN14-100000 and above. They were priced at ¥2,270,000.
- GTI-RB: Model number EBYNRRFN14T******* (aka RB / Base / Beta / Rally / Homologation). The homologated model was stripped-down as a base for motorsport use (Group N rallying in particular). It had the luxury trimmings such as air conditioning, power windows, and ABS removed as standard, and the simple interior trim from the base model N14 which reduced the curb weight by 30 kg (66 lb) to 1,190 kg (2,624 lb). A close-ratio gearbox was a production model option, some of the RA items could be optioned (such as rear wiper and air conditioning), and many Nismo parts were available at time of order (such as mechanical limited-slip differentials and upgraded suspension). Those that were ordered with Nismo parts not suitable for dealer install were sent to Autech for factory installation. 21 Pulsar GTI-R NISMO were built in total. The only external visual difference to the RA is non-colour-coded side mirrors.
- Sunny GTI-R: Model number EBYNL*N14*******. Sunny was the badge used for the European-delivered GTI-R, which has the different chassis number of EGNN14. The engine and mechanicals are the same as the Pulsar GTI-R but the power and torque specifications (220 PS / 162 kW and 267 Nm / 197 lb·ft) are slightly less due to the ECU having different fuel and ignition maps to compensate for the lower octane fuel available in those regions. There was no RB variant offered, but they were available in both LHD and RHD configuration. The only obvious external physical difference to the Pulsar is the rear number plate surround (to accommodate wider European plates). The interior varied from the RA Pulsar with some of the more basic trim from the RB model and different scaling on the gauges.

Other versions:

- Nismo: Nismo offered a "Complete Car" version based on the RB model featuring many of the Nismo rally options (such as suspension, limited-slip differentials, roll cage and foot rests), and strengthening plates spot welded to the strut towers. A total of 21 were produced, with an individually numbered Nismo VIN plate on the firewall. At least one was used by Nissan/Nismo as a promotional vehicle, the others were ordered by private buyers. They were priced at ¥3,140,000.
- Group A: The works rally cars were built and used for the WRC by Nissan Motorsports Europe (NME), they were not available to the general public. After the GTI-R program was shut down, the cars were sold to private buyers, predominately in Europe, where some made their way into rallycross events. Tony Bardy regularly competed in UK rallies using one until 2015. Nissan has the 1991 Acropolis rally and the 1992 RAC rally entry vehicles on display at the Nissan Heritage Collection in Japan.

==== Production ====
The Pulsar GTI-R was manufactured in Japan between August 1990 until November 1994. The Sunny GTI-R was produced from February 1992 until October 1993. The first year of production (1990–1991) was the largest due to Nissan needing to fulfil the FIA Group A regulations at the time (5,000 models total, with 500 of them homologation models) in order to enter the car as a manufacturer in the WRC.

- Pulsar GTI-RA = 13131
- Pulsar GTI-RB = 701
- Pulsar Unknown = 10
- Pulsar GTI-R TOTAL = 13842
- Sunny GTI-R LHD = 668
- Sunny GTI-R RHD = 103
- Sunny GTI-R TOTAL = 771
- GTI-R TOTAL = 14613

==== WRC ====
===== Group A =====
After producing the minimum required 5,000 examples (500 of them being homologation models), Nissan entered the GTI-R under Group A rules in the FIA WRC as a factory team (Nissan Motorsport Europe – NME) in 1991 and 1992.

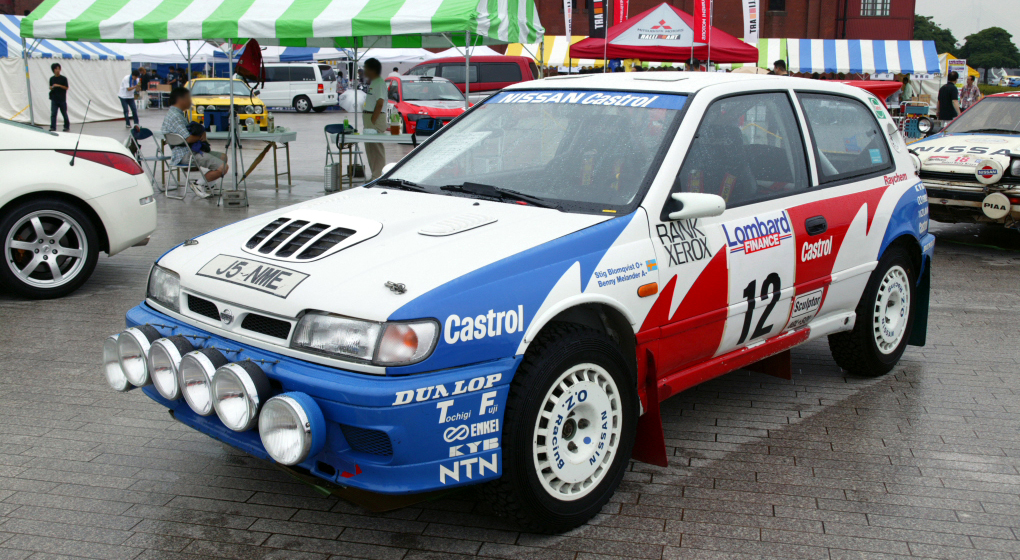
Nissan Pulsar GTI-R Group A (Japan)

Based in Milton Keynes, NME only competed in selected rallies during both years (ones they thought had the highest potential for good results), but the initial success expected by Nissan Japan was not forthcoming, and they abandoned the campaign in 1992 after only nine rallies. Factory development stopped there, and the GTI-R never won a WRC Group A rally. The official NME rally cars were driven by Stig Blomqvist, David Llewellin, and Mike Kirkland in the 1991 WRC. For the 1992 season, Blomqvist stayed with the team, and NME also hired François Chatriot and Tommi Makinen.

Nissan redirected funding to Le Mans and the development of the R390, and NME moved their focus to the FWD Sunny GTI in the WRC F2 category (A7 class) where they had success with Alister McRae winning the 1995 BRC. It is generally agreed that the Group A GTI-R campaign failure was due to the combination of the uncompetitive Dunlop tyres, the inefficiency of the top-mounted intercooler when engine power was increased to Group A standards (especially in hot weather), and the political and cultural issues between Nissan Japan and the newly created NME.

1991 results (Group A)
| | Round 4 | Round 6 | Round 9 | Round 14 |
| | 39th Martini Safari rally Kenya | 38th Acropolis Rally | 41st 1000 Lakes Rally | 47th Lombard RAC Rally |
|---|---|---|---|---|
| Stig Blomqvist | 5th | DNF (differential) | 8th | DNF (suspension) |
| David Llewellin | DNF (accident) | 9th | 10th | DNF (electrical) |
| Mike Kirkland | 7th | | | |

1992 results (Group A)
| | Round 1 | Round 2 | Round 3 | Round 9 | Round 14 |
| | 60th Rallye Automobile de Monte-Carlo | 41st International Swedish Rally | 25th Rallye de Portugal | 42nd 1000 Lakes Rally | 48th Lombard RAC Rally |
|---|---|---|---|---|---|
| Stig Blomqvist | | 3rd | | DNF (engine) | DNF (accident) |
| Tommi Mäkinen | 9th | | DNF (accident) | DNF (gearbox) | 8th |
| François Chatriot | 7th | | 6th | | |

===== Group N =====
Nissan/NME did not enter Group N (production) cars in the World Rally Championship, but they helped develop a car for the Nissan Belgium Rally Team with lead driver Grégoire De Mévius. Together with Japanese privateer team Nishiyama Racing driven by Hiroshi Nishiyama, the GTI-R had great success in the Group N Championship (FIA) Cup for Drivers of Production Cars in 1992 taking 1st and 2nd places, clearly demonstrating the GTI-R's ability at production class level.

1992 results (Group N)
| | Round 3 | Round 4 | Round 6 | Round 8 | Round 9 | Round 12 | Round 14 | Final Classification |
| | 26th Rallye de Portugal | 40th Martini Safari Rally Kenya | 39th Acropolis Rally | 12th Rally Argentina | 42nd 1000 Lakes Rally | 24th Rallye Côte d'Ivoire Bandama | 48th Lombard RAC Rally | Final Classification |
|---|---|---|---|---|---|---|---|---|
| Grégoire De Mévius | 3rd | | 1st | DNF (Late for start) | 3rd | DNF (Engine) | 2nd | 1st |
| Hiroshi Nishiyama | | 3rd | | 2nd | | 1st | | 2nd |

== N15 (1995) ==
N15
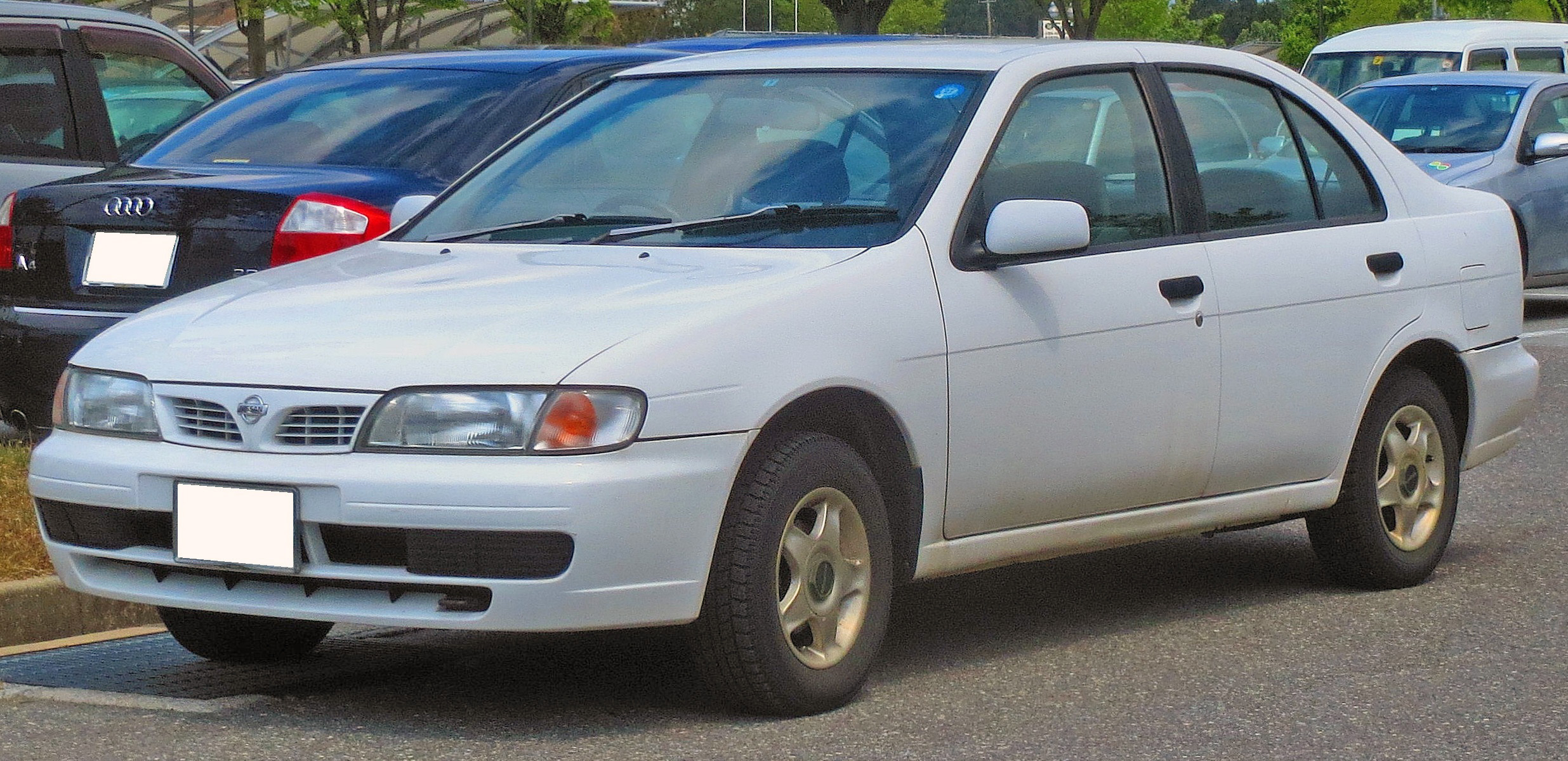
- Pre-facelift Nissan Pulsar sedan (Japan)

Overview
- Also called: Nissan Sentra (New Zealand); Nissan Almera (Europe); Nissan Lucino (Japan)
- Production: 1995–2000
- Assembly: Japan: Yokosuka, Kanagawa (Oppama Plant)

Body and chassis
- Body style: 3/5-door hatchback 4-door sedan
- Layout: Front-engine, front-wheel-drive Front-engine, all-wheel-drive
- Related: Nissan Primera (P11); Nissan Sentra (B14)

Powertrain
- Engine: 1.4 L GA14DE I4; 1.5 L GA15DE I4; 1.6 L GA16DE I4; 1.6 L SR16VE I4; 1.8 L SR18DE I4; 2.0 L SR20DE I4; 2.0 L CD20 I4

Dimensions
- Wheelbase: 2,535 mm (99.8 in)
- Length: 4,120 mm (162.2 in) (hatch); 4,320 mm (170.1 in) (sedan)
- Width: 1,690 mm (66.5 in)
- Height: 1,385 mm (54.5 in)
- Curb weight: 1,040–1,280 kg (2,293–2,822 lb)

In 1995, the N15 Pulsar was launched as a compact car, rather than subcompact, and sold in Europe as the Nissan Almera. The New Zealand Nissan Sentra changed name to Pulsar after the Nissan assembly plant in Wiri, Auckland closed down in 1998, in favor of imports from Japan. Again, four- and five-door models were offered, with three-door models being available in Europe and Japan only, and not Australia and New Zealand. North American customers did not receive this car, with the Sunny-based Sentra B14 being sold there instead.

The chassis designation "N" series carried over to the Bluebird Sylphy (N16) in 2000 for the Japanese market.

The Australian versions included the LX, SLX, Q and SSS variants. New Zealand specific versions included the S and SE variants. The SSS model (5-door hatch only) featured the SR20DE engine featuring 143 PS (105 kW; 141 hp) and 179 N⋅m (132 lb⋅ft).

The station wagon continued to be from the Sunny, later spun off in Japan into the Nissan Wingroad.

=== Trim levels ===
Japan

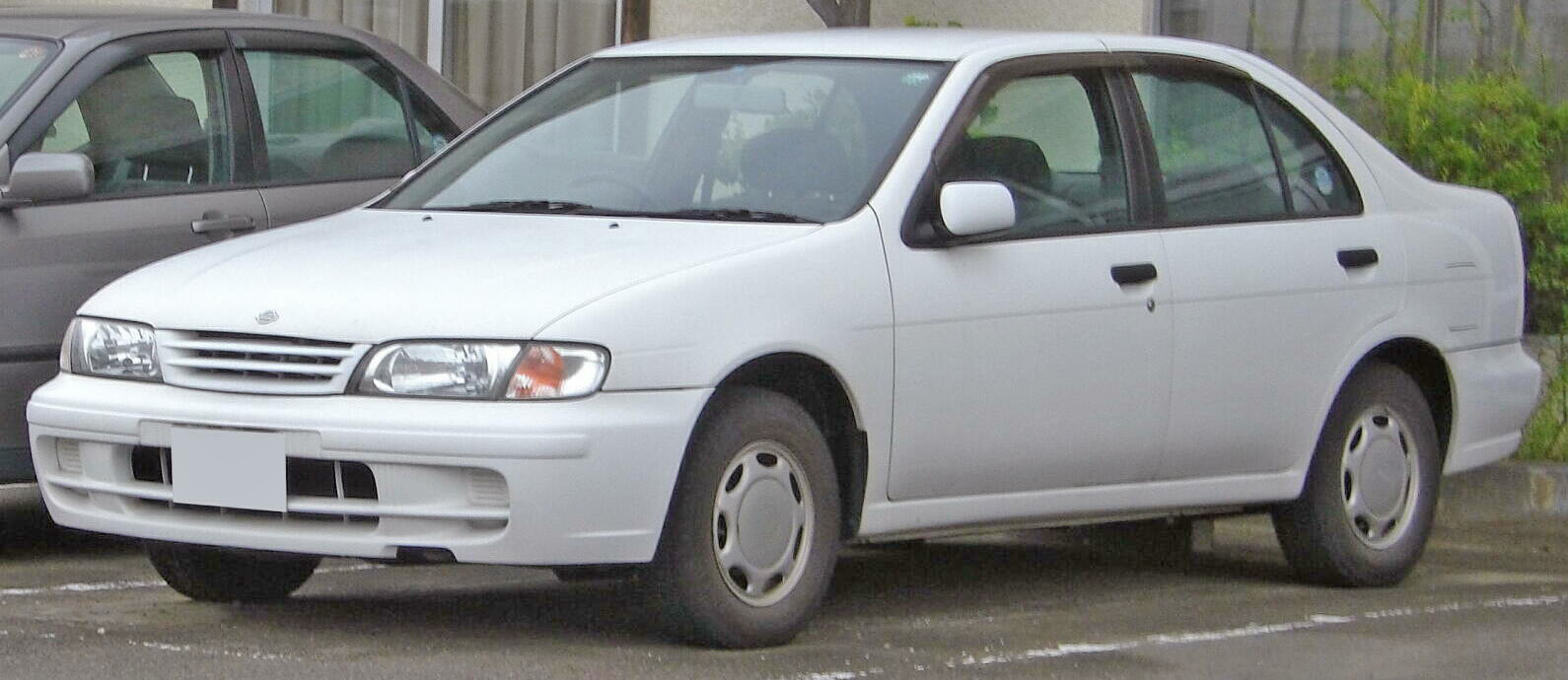
Facelift Nissan Pulsar sedan (Japan)

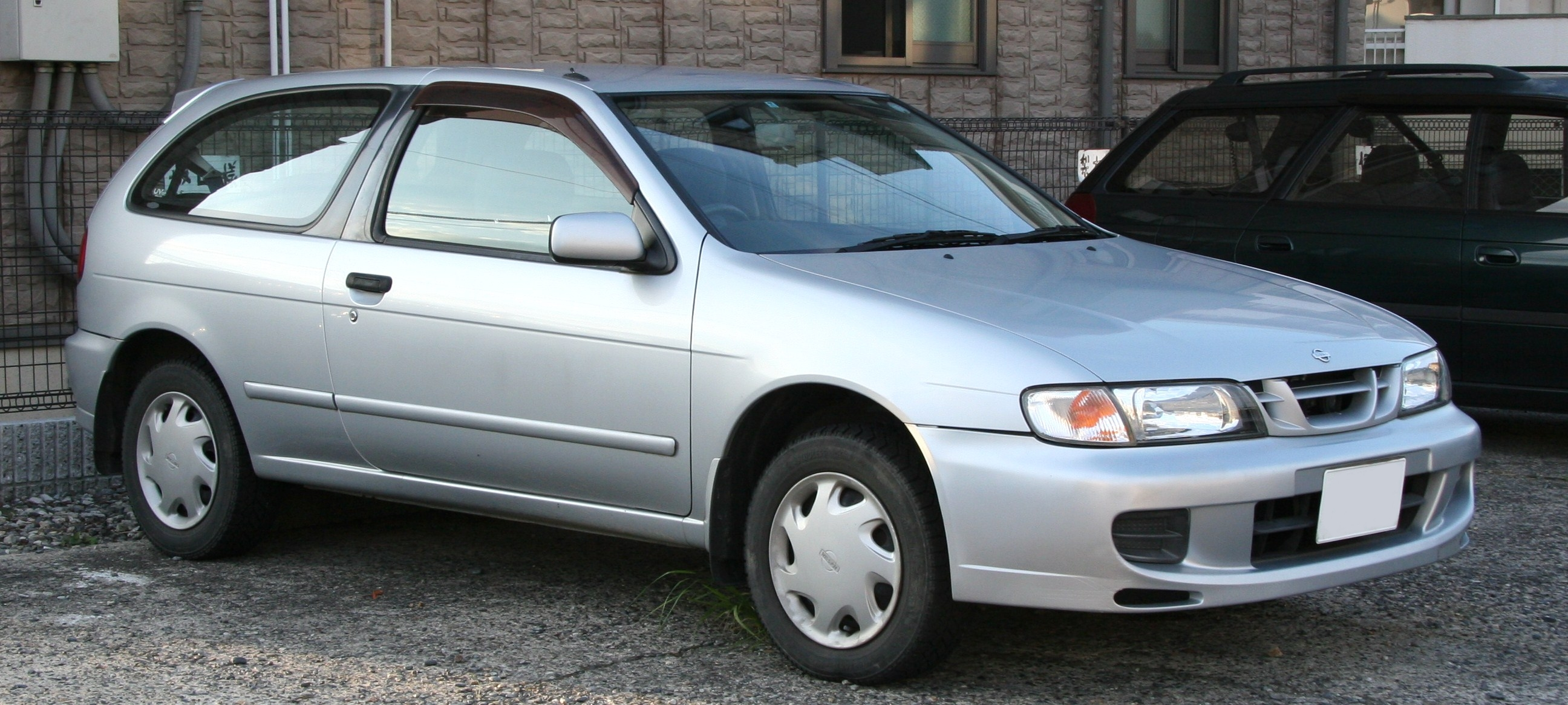
1997 Nissan Pulsar Serie 3-door (Japan)

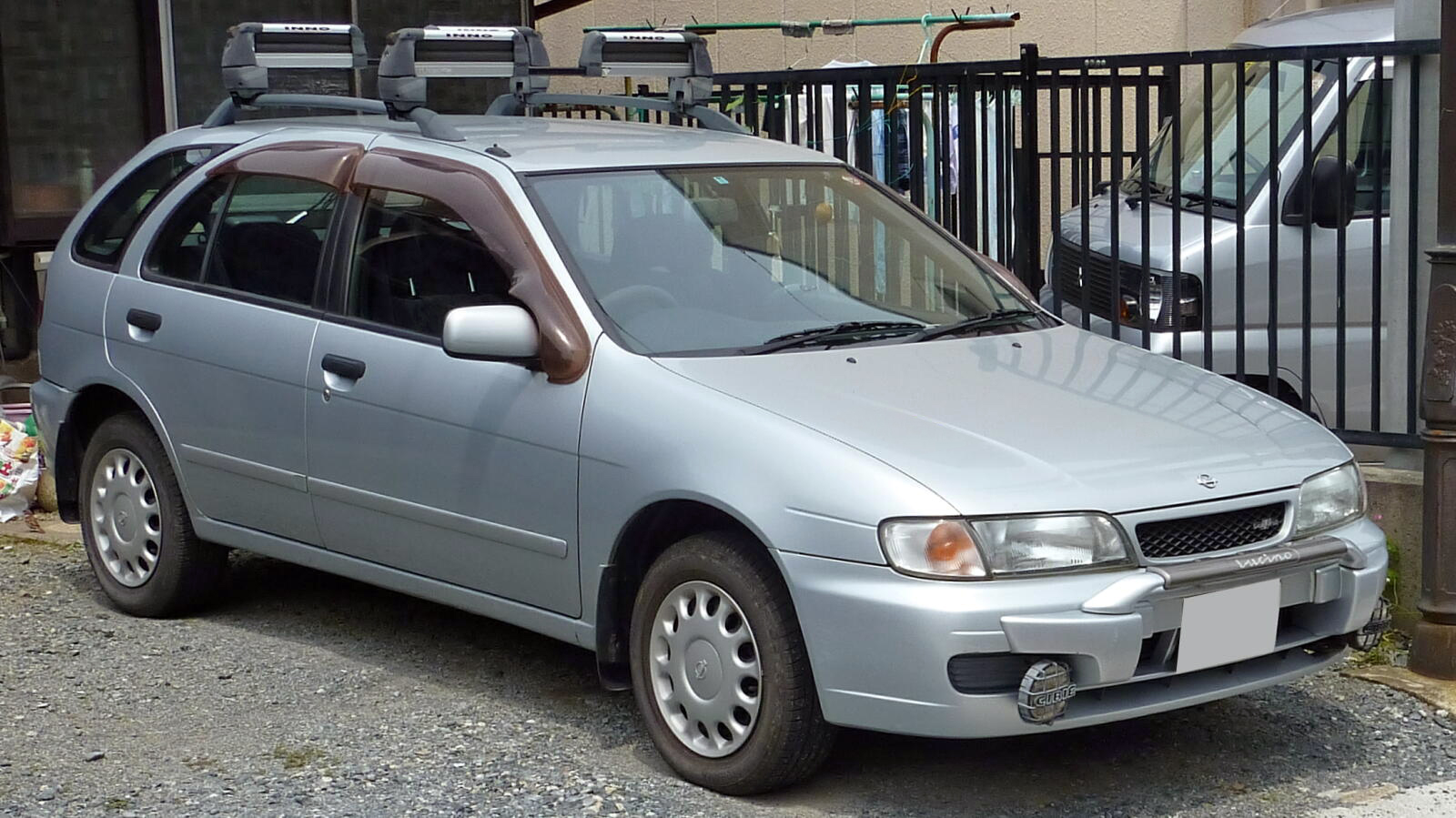
Nissan Lucino S-RV

In Japan, the N15 was available under numerous nameplates, giving Nissan in Japan the opportunity to sell the Pulsar at two different Japanese network dealerships, called Nissan Cherry Store that sold the Pulsar, and Nissan Satio Store that sold the Lucino. Hatchback models were badged Pulsar Serie.

Japanese market N15 Pulsar and Lucino models had drivers airbag as standard. Passenger airbag was an option in 1995 and standard from 1996 onwards. Speedometer became digital from 1998. A tachometer was not present on the Pulsar Rezzo, CJ-I, CJ-II, or Lucino BB models. Air conditioning was standard on almost all models, but was available as a delete option. Manually operated windows were fitted on the low-cost Rezzo, CJ-I, CJ-II, and Lucino BB models, otherwise electric windows were standard. Sunroof was available option on the Pulsar X1, X1R, GTI, VZ-R, and Pulsar / Lucino SR-V models (hatch only). Manual controlled air conditioning controls were standard, climate control was available as option and standard on the Pulsar X1R, GTI, and VZ-R.

An Autech Trimmed version of the Pulsar SR-V and Lucino SR-V known as the "Aero Sport" was also available. Equipped with the standard SR20DE, compression Ratio : 10.0, maximum power 110 kW (150 PS; 148 hp). Indicative features included the placement of the spare-wheel on the rear boot lid, inclusion of rubber side moldings over the wheel arches, large rear spoiler, extra rubber door protectors, And unique decals on the sides of the car. As a result of shifting the spare-wheel to the boot lid, the number plate had to be relocated in the rear bumper, meaning a bumper was produced specific for this model. Extra features on this model were limited to the additional body kit.

Configurations:

The N15 Nissan Pulsar came with the following engine options:

GA14DE — 1400 cc DOHC MPFI. Featured in the European Nissan Almera LX, Almera S.

GA15DE — 1500 cc DOHC MPFI. Featured in the New Zealand Sentra S, JDM Pulsar Serie Rezzo, JDM Pulsar Serie X1, JDM Pulsar CJ-I, JDM Pulsar CJ-II, JDM Pulsar SR-V, JDM Lucino BB, JDM Lucino JJ and JDM Lucino SR-V. There was a 4-wheel drive variant of the GA engine series available in the JDM Pulsar SR-V and JDM Lucino SR-V 5-door hatch and some JDM Pulsar CJ-I, Pulsar CJ-II and JDM Pulsar X1 4-door sedans.

GA16DE — 1600 cc DOHC multi-point EFI (sometimes ECCS featured). Featured in the Australian and New Zealand new models Sentra SE, Sentra SLX Sentra Q and JDM Pulsar X1R hatch and sedan variants, and the European Almera SR, ALMERA SRI.

SR18DE — 1800 cc DOHC multi-point EFI. Featured in the JDM Pulsar GTI 3-door hatch and 4-door sedan, JDM Pulsar SR-V 5-door hatch models. 4-wheel drive variant of SR engine series available in JDM Pulsar SR-V model.

SR20DE – 2000 cc DOHC multi-point EFI. Featured in Australian and New Zealand (Australian assembled) Sentra and Pulsar SSS variant delivered with silver/red rocker cover, also called "Red Top" 143 PS (105 kW; 141 hp) at 6400 rpm / 179 N⋅m (132 lb⋅ft) at 4800 rpm / 0–100 km/h (62 mph) 8.2 seconds / Curb weight 1,142 kg (2,518 lb).

Autech Version SR20DE — 1998 cc DOHC multi-point EFI. Only Sold locally in Japan. Was used in Pulsar Serie and Lucino Japanese Variants (576 produced total). These cars were delivered from Nissan as standard front wheel drive N15 GTI's, and delivered to Autech for Tuning. The cars were than striped, seam welded for added rigidity, and Autech body kits including unique Front bumper, Side skirt and Rear wing. Autech interiors including unique pattern interior, Autech labeled clusters, and Finally Autech Sr20DE engines were installed. Which is why they are stamped SR18DE, as this is the original size of the engine from the GTI. The tuned SR20DE found in these cars, were engines that Autech had from producing the P10 Primera Autech, However, due to multiple factors, Primarily stricter emission standards, and also Nissan about to release the SR16VE, it was de-tuned from the original P10 Autech, losing 5HP and 3NM of torque as well as a less aggressive power curve to meet the stricter emission standards. Featured compression ratio of 11.5:1, 264 duration at 11.4 mm lift camshafts, unique valve springs, portwork, and unique pistons to achieve high compression. Power is stated as 175 PS (129 kW; 173 hp) at the flywheel; 191 N⋅m (141 lb⋅ft) at 4800 rpm.

SR16VE — NEO VVL (Nissan Ecologically Orientated Variable Valve Timing and Lift). Featured in the Japanese market Pulsar/Lucino Serie VZ-R, as well as the B14 Sunny. Producing 175 PS (129 kW; 173 hp) from its 1.6 litres of displacement. Identifiable by the unique blue valve cover.

VZR Autech A Pulsar/ Lucino Variant of the VZ-R, Equip with the standard SR16VE from the VZ-R producing 175 PS (129 kW; 173 hp), with an additional body kit & interior pieces. Additional extras include, Unique Autech front bumper & fog lights, side skirts, bumper end caps, N1 Spoiler, Fujitsubo Muffler, Unique trimmed Seats / Door Trim, Momo Steering Wheel, Leather Gear knob & Hand Break lever with Red stitching, Autech labeled cluster.

SR16VE N1 — Featured in the JDM Pulsar VZ-R N1, which was a racing homologation version intended to compete with the Honda Civic Type R. Producing 200 PS (147 kW; 197 hp) from its 1.6 L SR16VE engine, it held the highest specific output ever for a naturally aspirated production car, at 123.125 hp/liter, until the Honda F20C engine was released in the Honda S2000. The "Version 2" (VerII) was introduced offering a few chassis and mechanical tweaks as well as an option orange trimmed interior with GTR Skyline front seats. N1's available in Black, White and Red.

CD20 — 2000 cc SOHC CRDi Diesel engine featured in the European Almera GX.

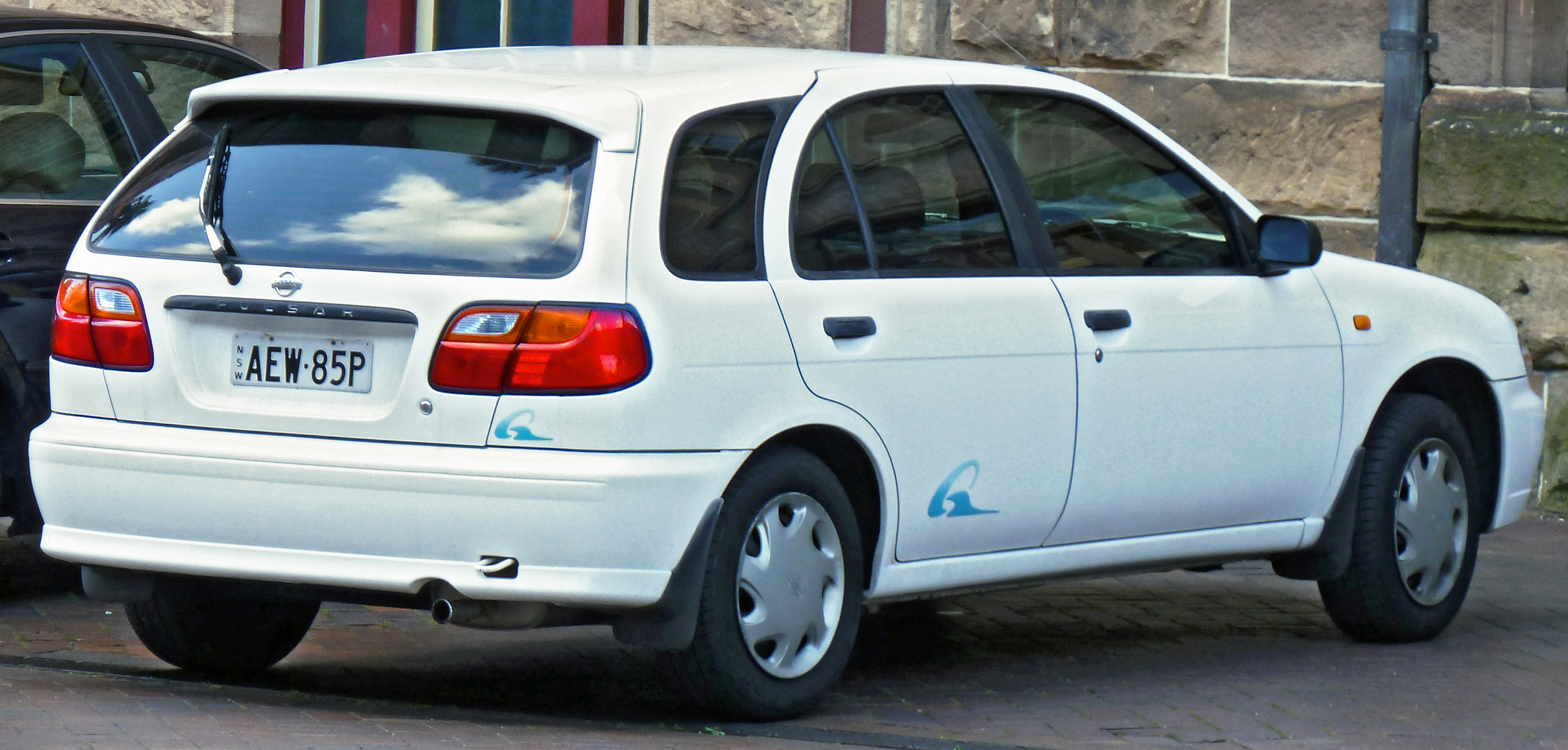
Pre-facelift Nissan Pulsar 5-door (Australia)

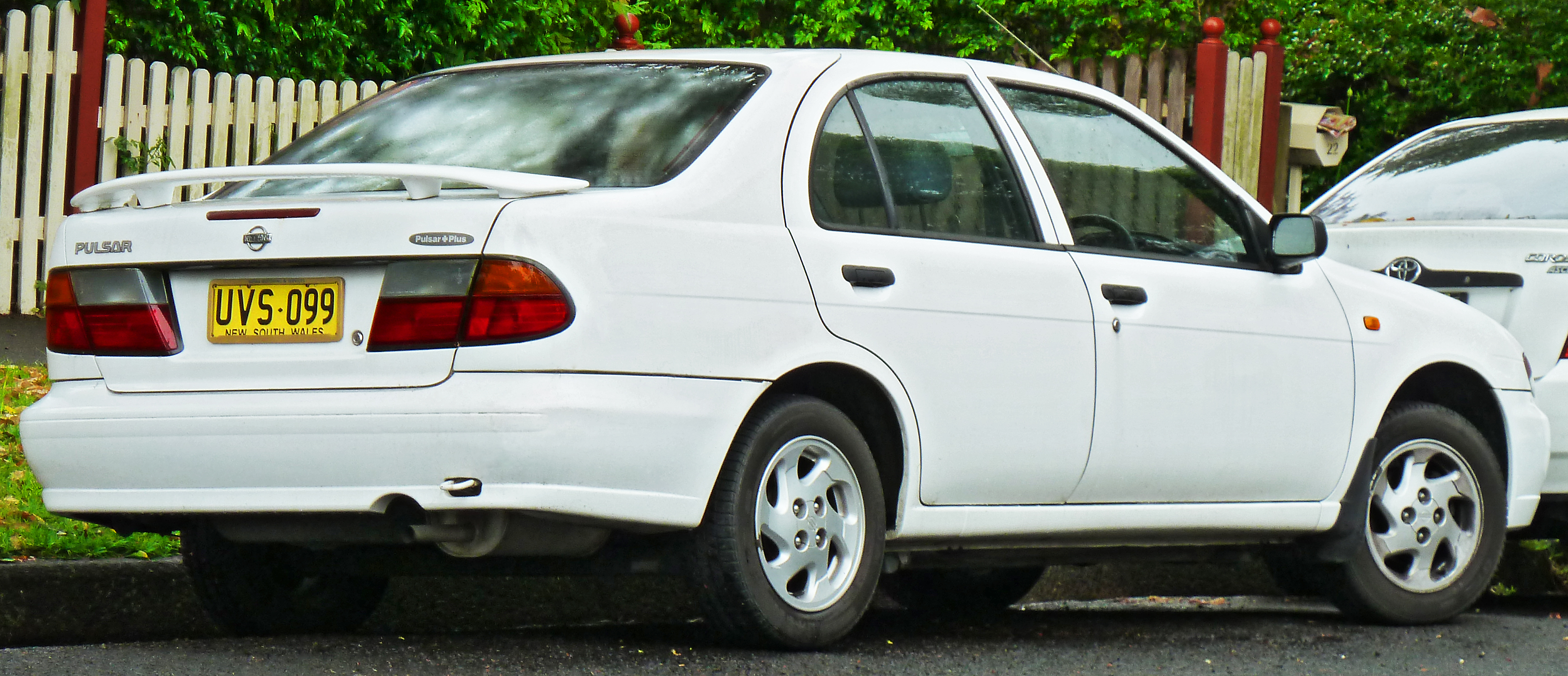
Pre-facelift Nissan Pulsar sedan (Australia)

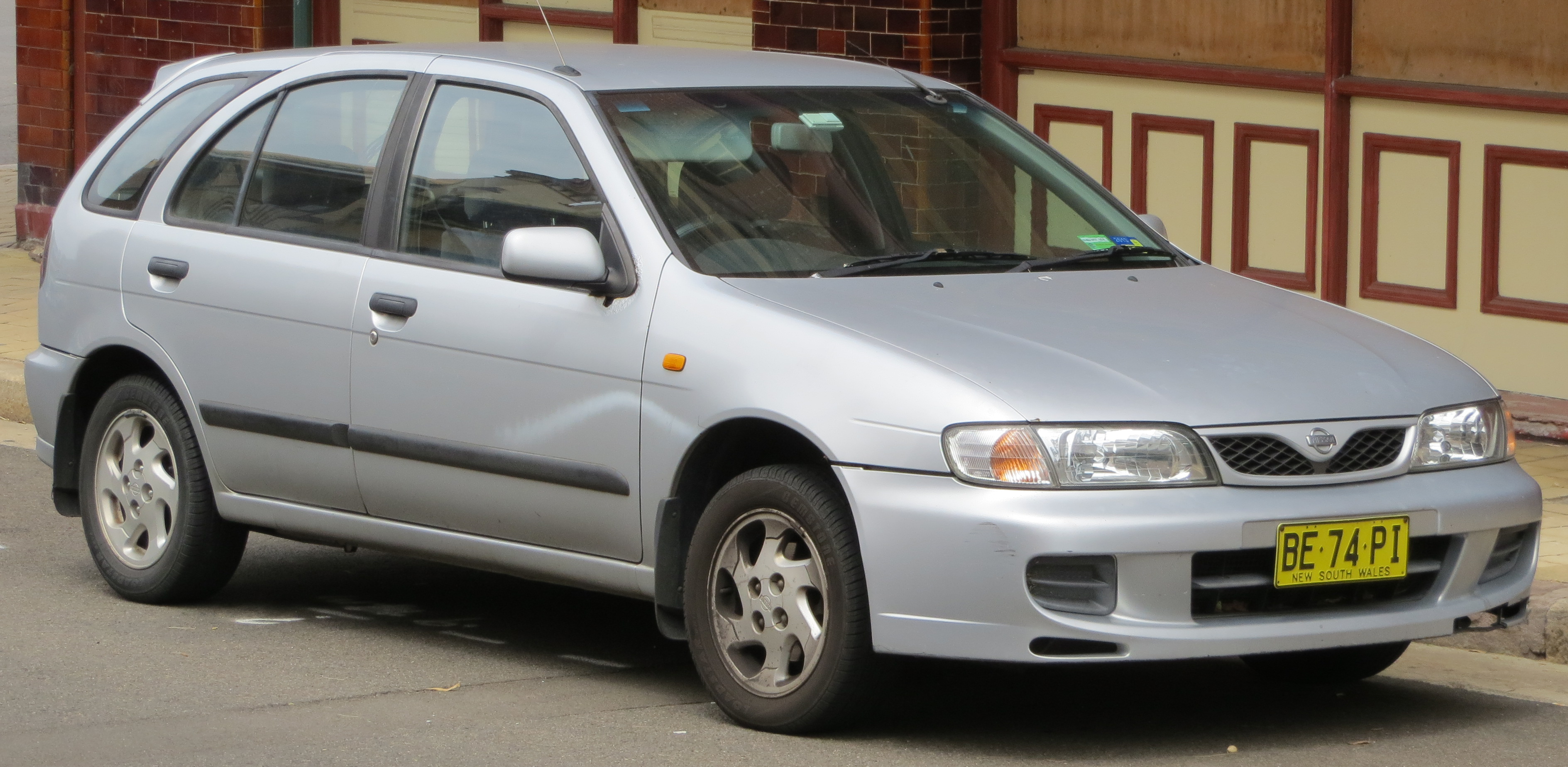
Facelift Nissan Pulsar 5-door (Australia)

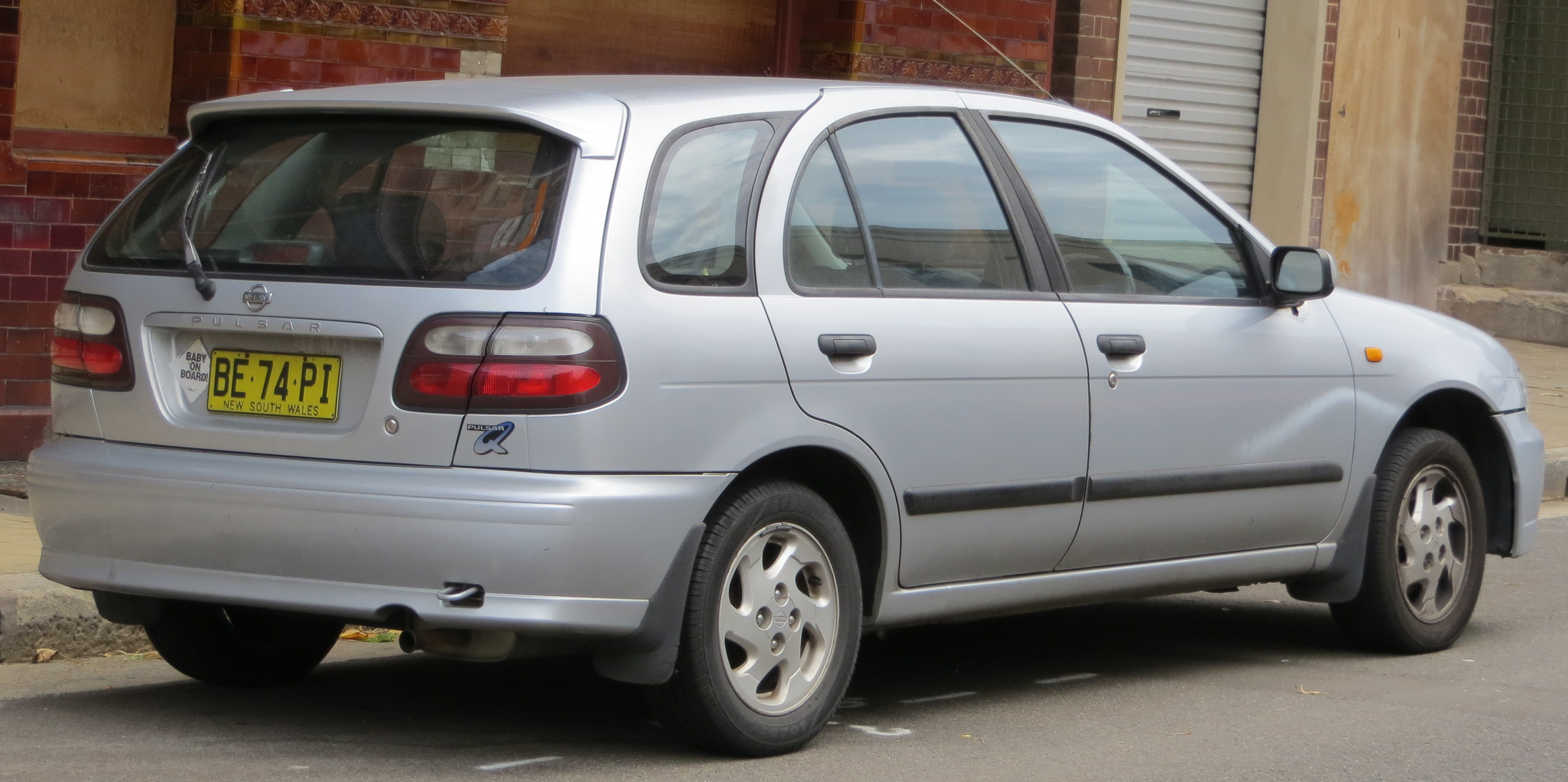
Facelift Nissan Pulsar 5-door (Australia)

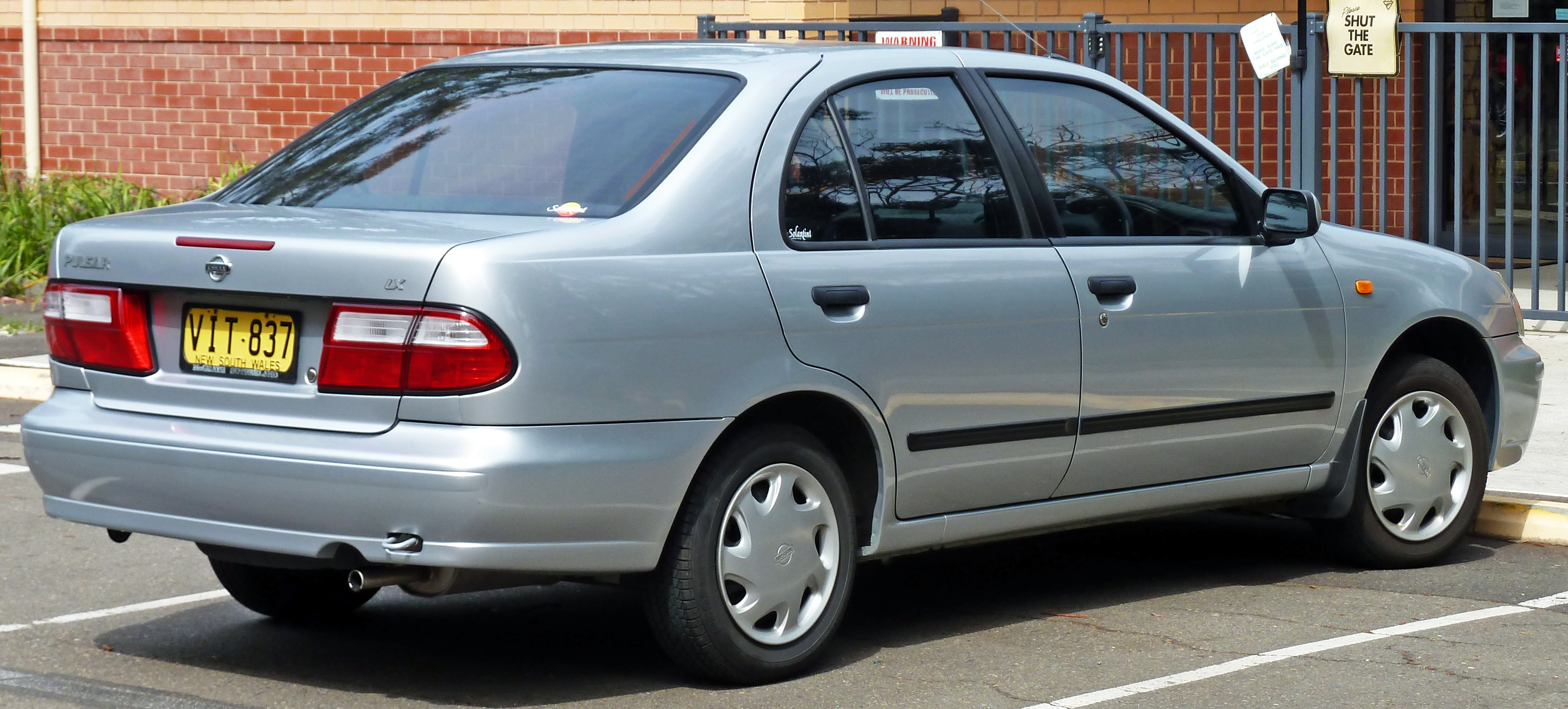
Facelift Nissan Pulsar sedan (Australia)

== N16 (2000) ==
In Australia and New Zealand, Nissan continued to use the Pulsar name for the N16 series that was labelled Nissan Bluebird Sylphy in Japan.

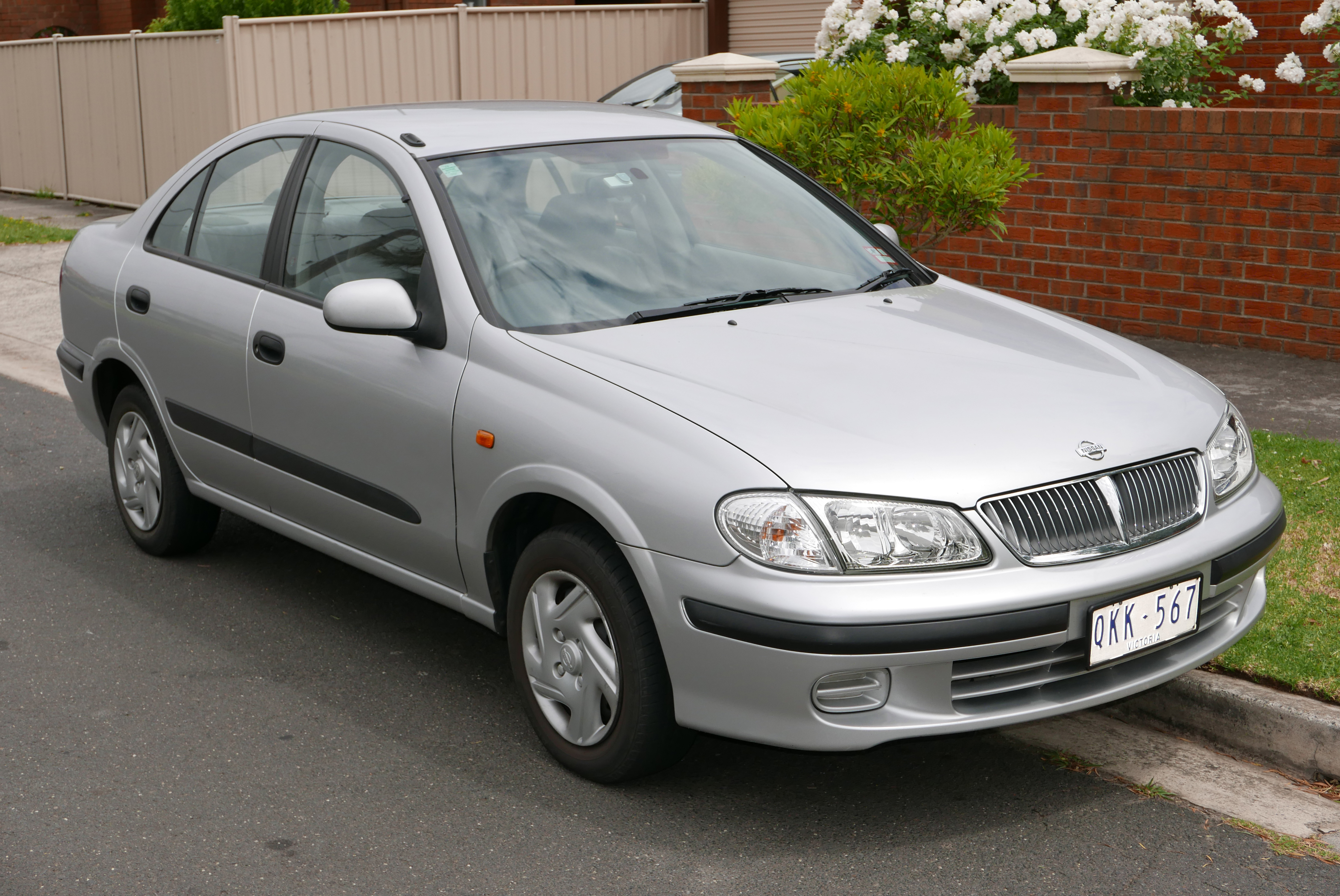
Nissan Pulsar (N16, 2000–2005)

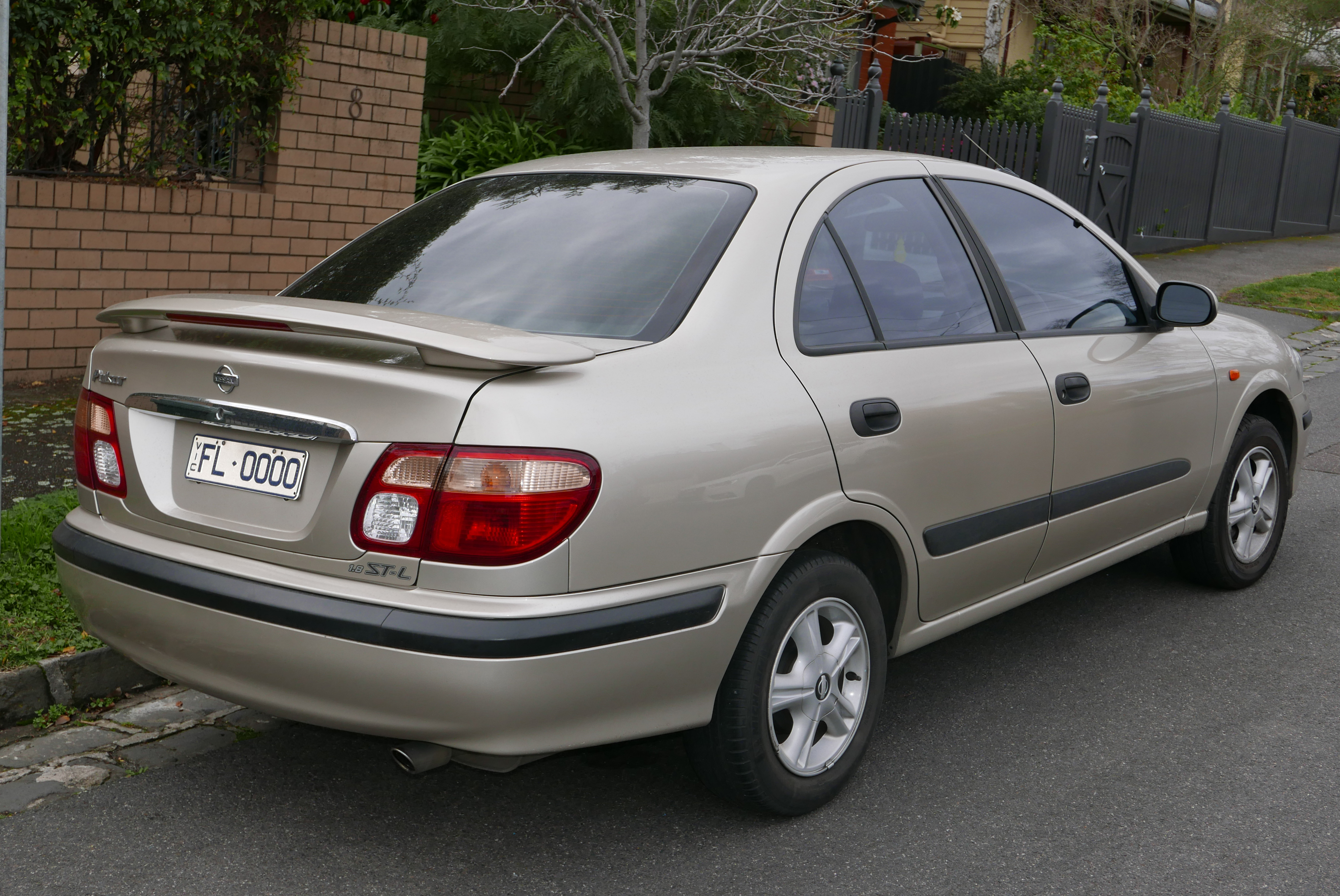
Nissan Pulsar (N16, 2000–2005)

== B17 (2013) ==
The B17 series Sylphy sedan was marketed as the Nissan Pulsar for the Australian and New Zealand markets from 2013. The model was discontinued in these two markets in April 2017, alongside the L33 Altima with no successor.

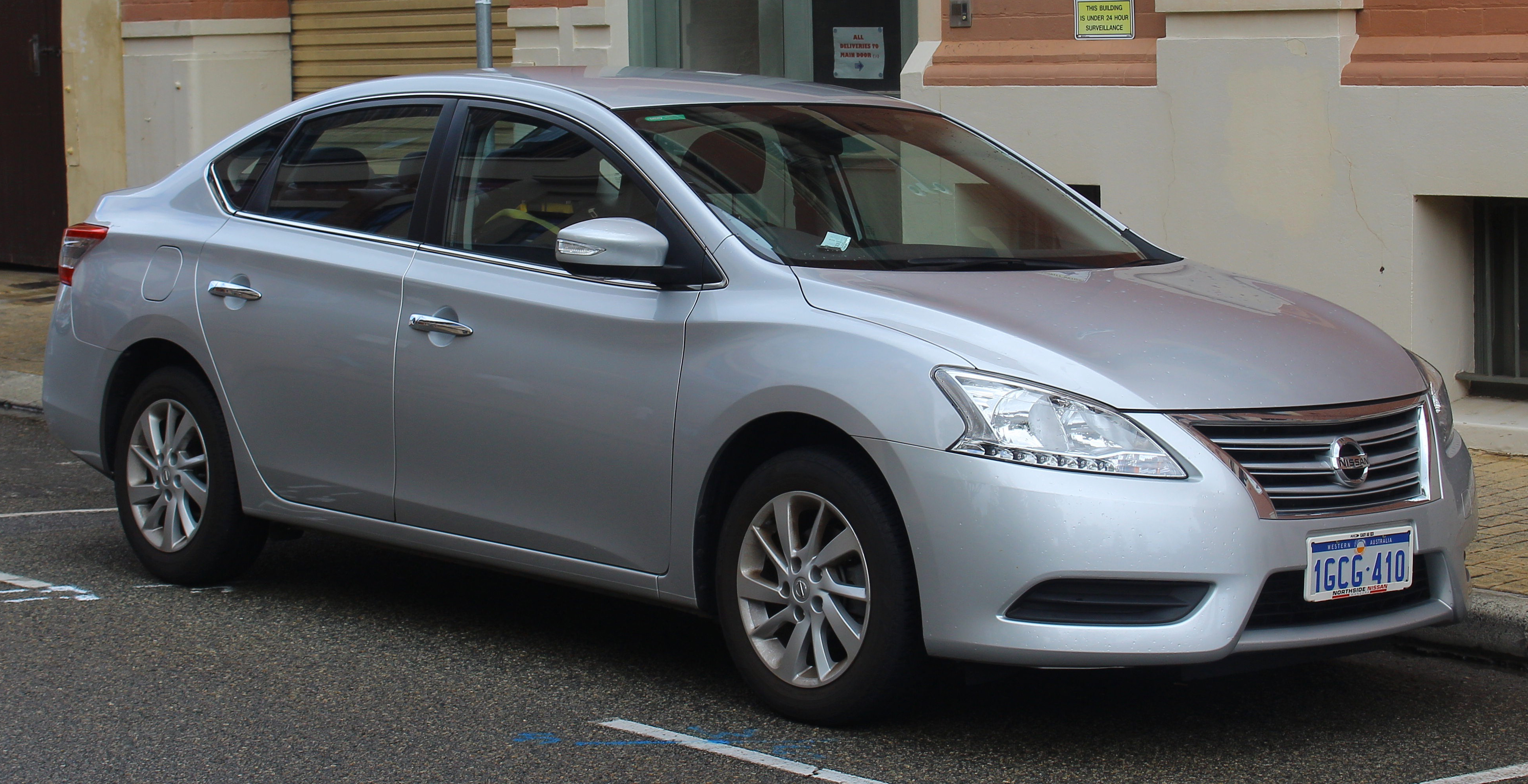
Nissan Pulsar (B17, 2013–2017)

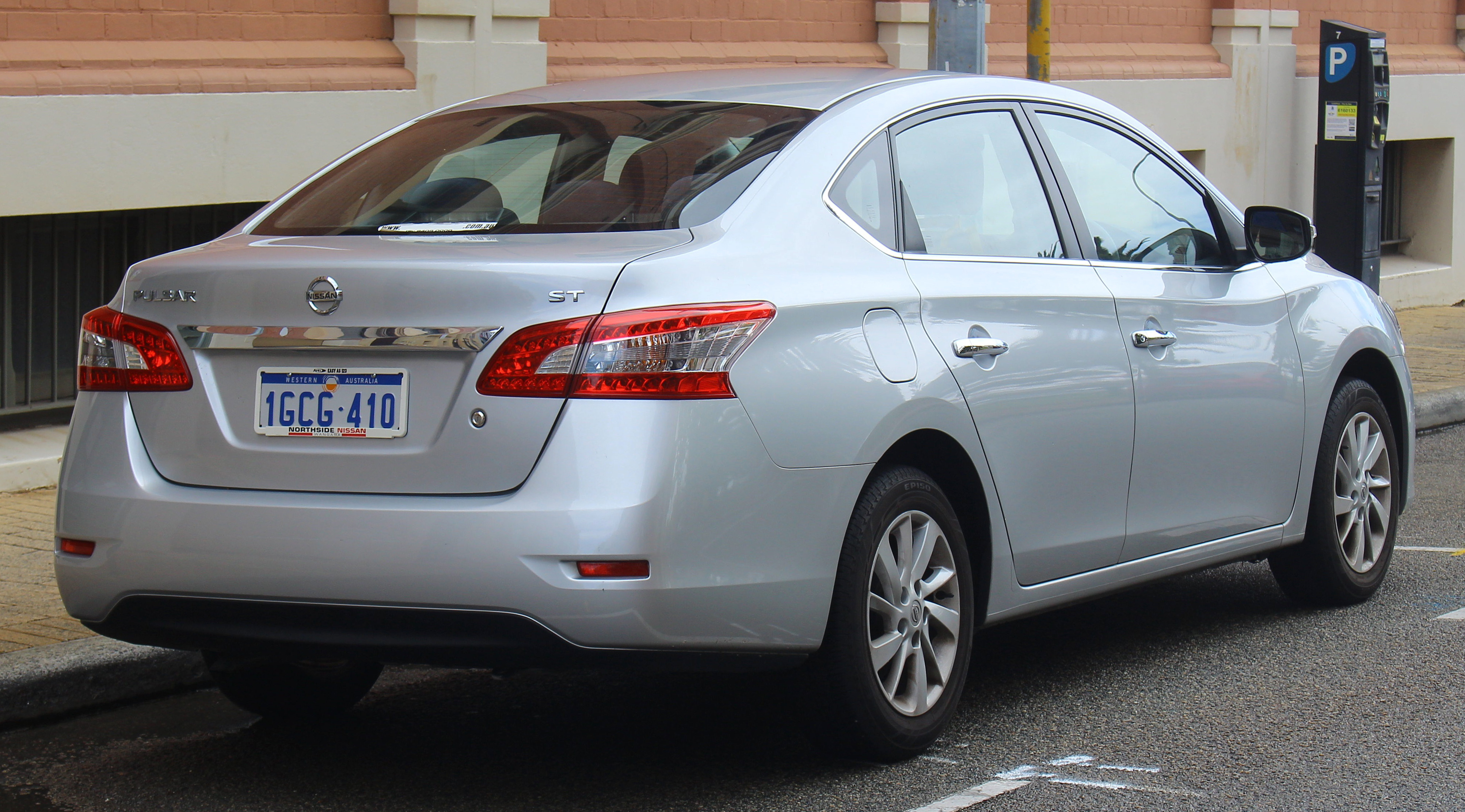
Nissan Pulsar (B17, 2013–2017)

== C12 (2013) ==
The C12 Pulsar hatchback was released in 2013 as a rebadged Nissan Tiida for Australia, New Zealand and Thailand. The C12 model was discontinued in Australia and New Zealand in April 2016 alongside the K13 Micra hatchback with no successor. It was also discontinued in Thailand in 2018, while it continues to be marketed in Taiwan as the Nissan Tiida.

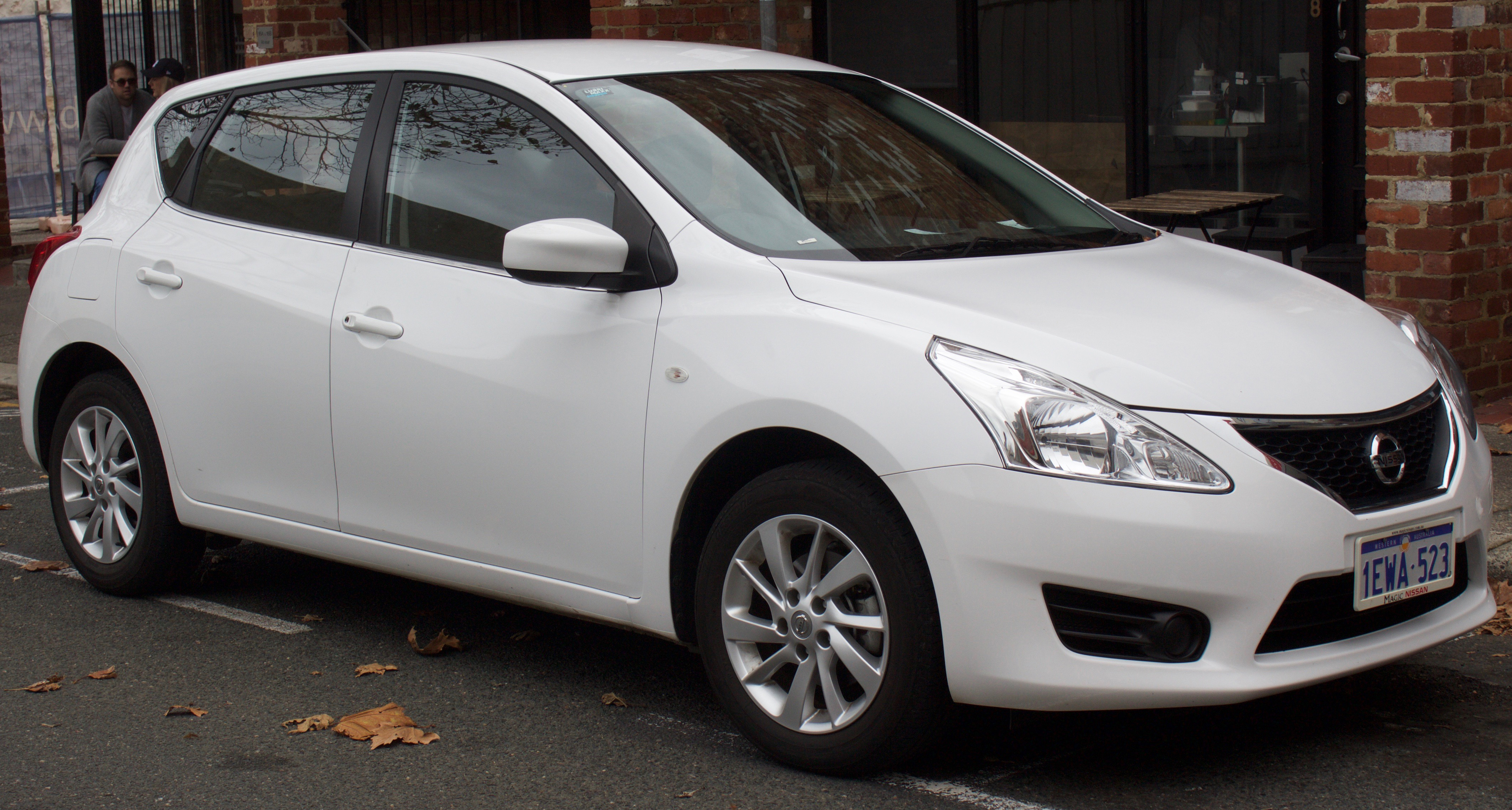
Nissan Pulsar (C12, 2013–2018)

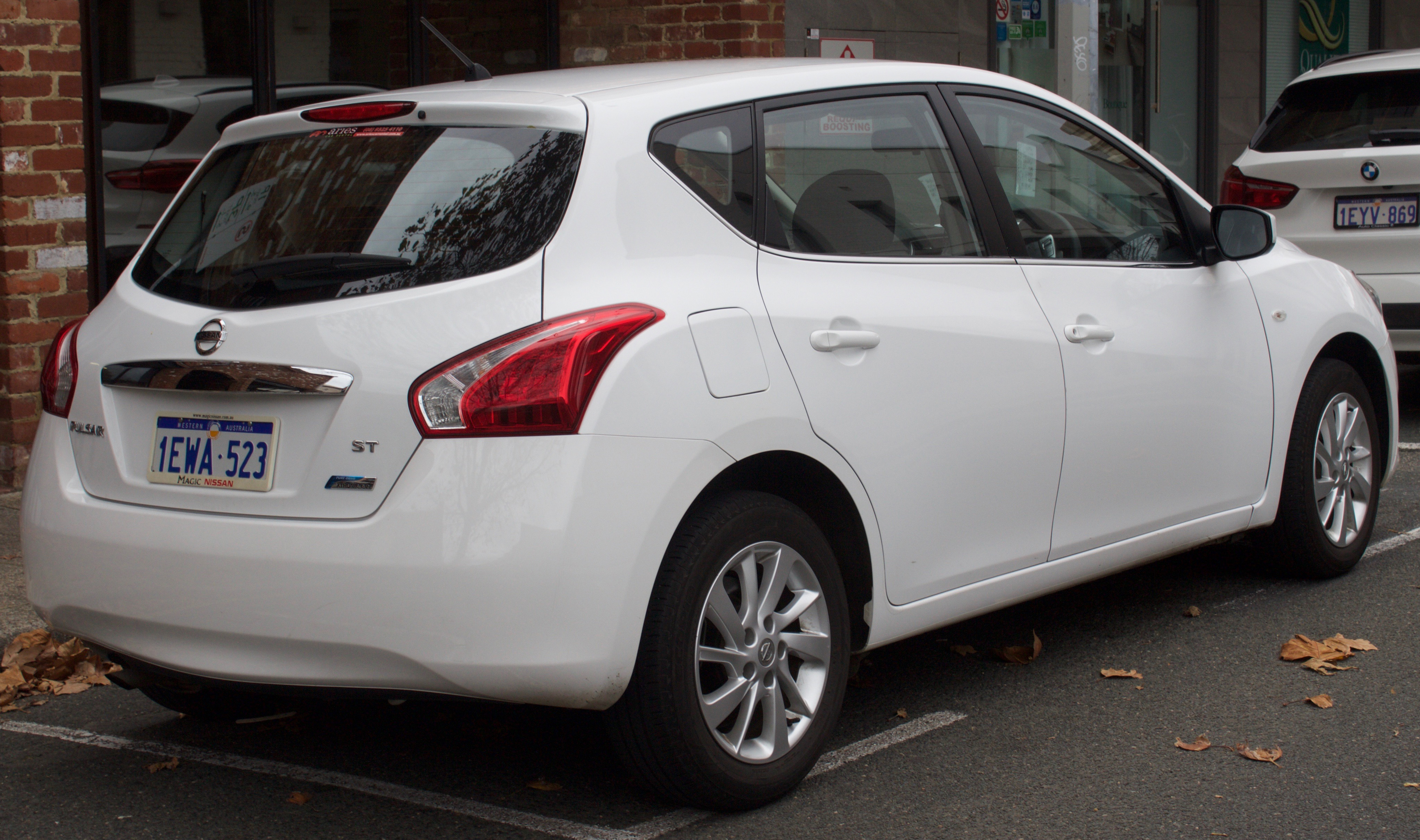
Nissan Pulsar (C12, 2013–2018)

== C13 (2014) ==
C13
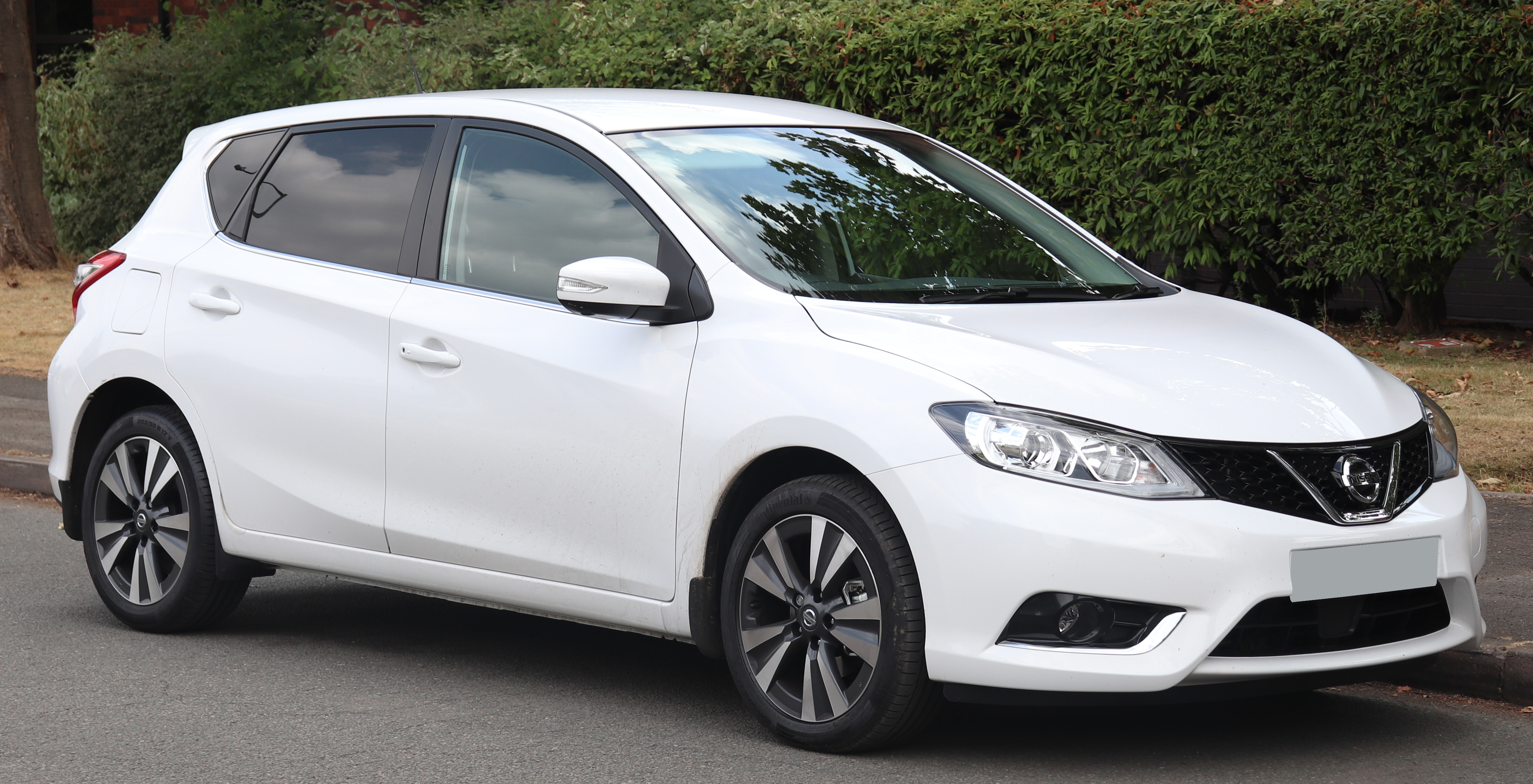
- 2018 Nissan Pulsar Tekna (UK)

Overview
- Also called: Nissan Tiida (Russia & China)
- Production: 2014–2018 (Europe); 2015 (Russia); 2016–2026 (China)
- Assembly: Spain: Barcelona (Nissan Motor Ibérica); China: Guangzhou (Dongfeng Nissan); Russia: Izhevsk

Body and chassis
- Layout: Front-engine, front-wheel-drive
- Platform: Renault–Nissan CMF-CD platform
- Related: Nissan Tiida (C12); Nissan Qashqai (J11)

Powertrain
- Engine: Petrol: 1.2 L HRA2/HR12DDT DIG-T turbo I4; 1.6 L MR16DDT DIG-T turbo I4; Diesel: 1.5 L K9K dCi turbo I4
- Transmission: 6-speed manual; CVT (X-Tronic)

Dimensions
- Wheelbase: 2,700 mm (106.3 in)
- Length: 4,387 mm (172.7 in)
- Width: 1,768 mm (69.6 in)
- Height: 1,520 mm (59.8 in)
- Curb weight: 1,265 kg (2,789 lb)

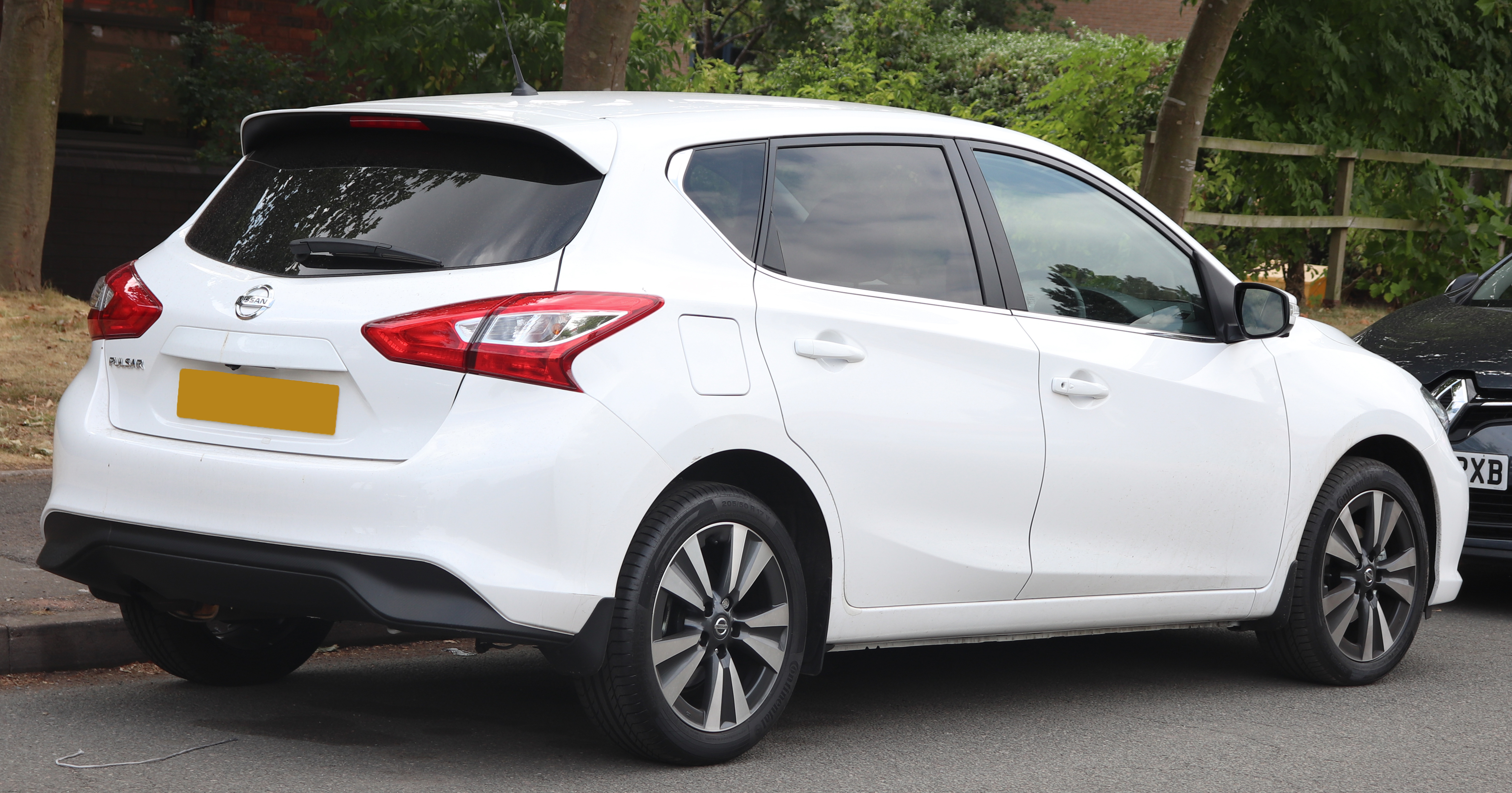
Rear view

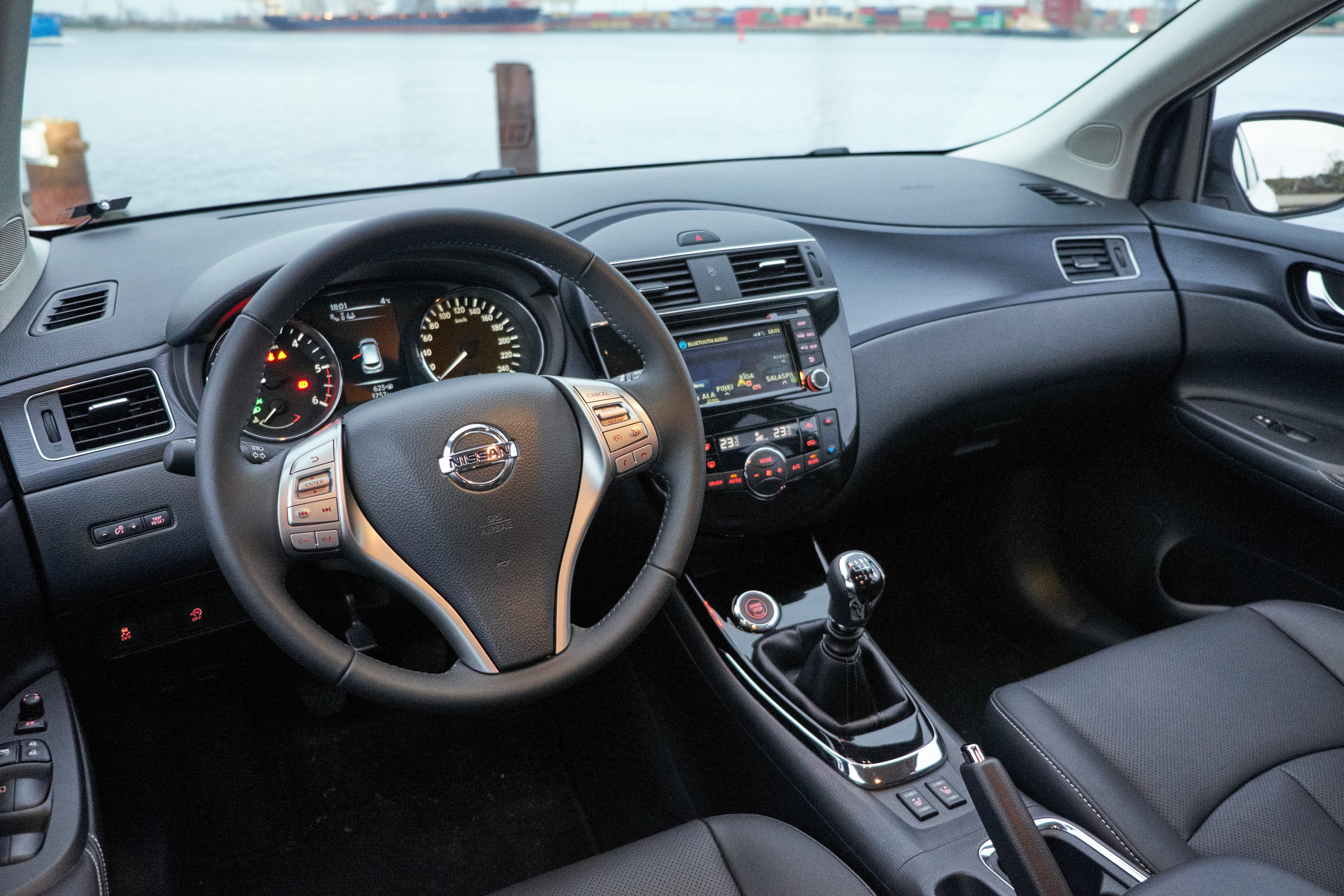
Interior

On 16 May 2014, Nissan revealed the C13 series Pulsar for the European market. Based on the CMF platform, this model does not replace the C12 version, but is a European-only alternative. The C13 Pulsar signifies Nissan's reentry into the highly competitive compact hatchback segment, following the withdrawal of the Tiida from the market in 2011. It marks the first time the Pulsar nameplate has officially been used in mainland Europe, rather than the Cherry, Sunny and Almera nameplates that have been used in Europe over the generations. European sales began in March 2015. Pulsars for sale in Europe were built at Nissan's Barcelona plant in Spain.

Initially, the C13 Pulsar was available with a 113 bhp (84 kW) 1.2-liter DiG-T petrol engine with CVT transmission or a 1.5-liter diesel unit producing 104 bhp (78 kW). In October 2014, Nissan introduced the 1.6-liter DIG-T which develops 140 kW (188 hp) and went on sale since March 2015.

The model was marketed in Russia since March 2015 as the Nissan Tiida, where it was assembled in Izhevsk from January 2015, but production only lasted until December of the same year due to low sales. It is also sold in China as the C13 series Nissan Tiida since 2016 after being displayed at the April 2016 Auto China. In other Asian markets, the Nissan Pulsar is launched in Singapore since January 2017.

The Pulsar was discontinued in Europe on 12 September 2018 due to poor demand, with Spanish production having ended in June of the same year. The Almera sedan was also discontinued in the Russian market alongside the Pulsar with sales and production ending in October 2018. The model is still sold in China under the Tiida nameplate with a 1.6-litre NA engine.

=== Sales ===
| Year | Europe |
|---|---|
| 2014 | 8,021 |
| 2015 | 43,267 |
| 2016 | 31,699 |
| 2017 | 25,183 |
| 2018 | 16,161 |
| 2019 | 560 |
| 2020 | 2 |
