= 1997 Australian GT Production Car Championship =

The 1997 Australian GT Production Car Championship was an Australian motor racing competition for Group 3E Series Production Cars. The championship, which was contested over an eight round series, was organised and administered by Procar Australia. It was recognised by the Confederation of Australian Motor Sport as the second Australian GT Production Car Championship.

The championship was won by Peter Fitzgerald driving a Porsche 911 RSCS Type 993.

== Schedule ==
The title was contested over an eight round series with two races per round.

- Round 1: Lakeside, Queensland, 4 May
- Round 2: Phillip Island, Victoria, 1 June
- Round 3: Calder Park, Victoria, 22 June
- Round 4: Amaroo Park, New South Wales, 20 July
- Round 5: Winton, Victoria, 10 August
- Round 6: Mallala Motor Sport Park, South Australia, 24 August
- Round 7: Lakeside, Queensland, 26 October
- Round 8: Amaroo Park, New South Wales, 9 November

== Points system ==
Outright championship points were awarded on a 15-12-10-8-6-5-4-3-2-1 basis to the first ten finishers in each race. An additional point was awarded to the driver setting the fastest qualifying lap for each race. Class points were awarded on a 15-12-10-8-6-5-4-3-2-1 basis to the first ten finishers in each class in each race.

== Championship standings ==
Position	Driver	No	Car	Entrant	Lak.	Phi.	Cal.	Ama.	Win.	Mal.	Lak.	Ama.	Total
1	Peter Fitzgerald	3	Porsche 993 RSCS	Falken Tyres	32	29	24	24	31	28	30	30	228
2	John Bowe	27	Ferrari F355 Challenge	Positive Hype Pty Ltd	-	27	27	32	25	28	26	24	189
3	Ed Aitken	8	Porsche 993 RSCS	E Aitkin	-	16	16	12	16	20	18	22	120
4	Domenic Beninca	52	Porsche 993 RSCS	Beninca Racing	22	20	25	18	10	8	6	-	109
5	Max Dunn	46	Porsche 993 RSCS	Dunn Furrugia Racing	18	10	-	10	10	11	-	16	75
6	Andrej Pavicevic	11	Subaru Impreza WRX	Andrej Pavicevic	11	4	11	1	5	4	11	9	56
7	Garry Waldon	27; 28	Ferrari F355 Challenge	Positive Hype Pty Ltd; Palmer Motorsport	18	-	-	-	-	-	18	-	36
8	Ross Almond	26	Mitsubishi Lancer Evo III	Ross Almond	-	-	5	7	-	5	9	8	34
9	Chris Kousparis	6	Subaru Impreza WRX	Nepean EFI	6	1	7	4	3	4	5	3	33
10	Alfredo Costanzo	10	Maserati Ghibli Cup	Cisco System Maserati	2	8	-	-	7	7	-	-	24
10	Ray Lintott	5	Dodge Viper GTS	Wagon Wheels Chrysler Jeep	-	12	-	-	-	-	-	12	24
12	John Smith	77	Porsche 993 RSCS	Gerhard Hassler	-	-	-	18	-	-	-	-	18
13	John Bourke	9	Toyota Supra RZ		-	6	-	-	10	-	-	-	16
13	Neal Bates	5	Dodge Viper GTS		-	-	-	-	16	-	-	-	16
15	Peter Boylan	7	Subaru Impreza WRX	PM Boylan	6	-	-	-	-	-	4	3	13
16	Gerhard Hassler	88	Porsche 993 RSCS	Gerhard Hassler	-	-	-	-	-	11	-	-	11
16	Peter McKay	10	Maserati Ghibli Cup	Cisco System Maserati	-	-	-	7	-	-	-	4	11
18	Murray Carter	18	Nissan 200SX Turbo	Murray Carter	4	1	4	-	-	-	-	-	9
19	Wayne Park	2	HSV GTSR	JC Motorsport	8	-	-	-	-	-	-	-	8
19	Beric Lynton	23	BMW 323i	Beric Lynton BMW	-	-	-	-	-	8	-	-	8
19	Kevin Weeks	70	Porsche 993 RSCS	Kevin Weeks	6	-	2	-	-	-	-	-	8
22	Paul Freestone	14	Lotus Esprit		-	-	6	-	-	-	-	-	6
22	Guy Gibbons	35	Subaru Impreza WRX	Guy Gibbons	1	-	5	-	-	-	-	-	6
22	John Cowley	2	HSV GTSR	JT Cowley	-	-	-	1	-	-	3	2	6
25	Troy Searle	15	BMW 323i	Roadchill Express	-	-	-	-	1	-	2	-	3
26	Phil Kirkham	71	Mazda 626	Rebound Clothing Company	-	-	-	-	-	-	2	-	2
26	Ian McAlister	66	Volvo 850 T5R	Ian McAlister	-	-	2	-	-	-	-	-	2
28	Anthony Robson	49	Toyota MR2 Bathurst	Osborne Motor Sport	-	-	-	-	-	-	-	1	1
Class A : Super Cars
1	Peter Fitzgerald	3	Porsche 993 RSCS	Falken Tyres	30	27	24	24	30	27	30	30	222
2	John Bowe	27	Ferrari F355 Challenge	Positive Hype Pty Ltd	-	27	25	30	24	27	24	22	179
3	Ed Aitken	8	Porsche 993 RSCS	E Aitkin	-	16	16	12	16	18	20	22	120
4	Domenic Beninca	52	Porsche 993 RSCS	Beninca Racing	22	20	25	18	10	8	6	-	109
5	Max Dunn	46	Porsche 993 RSCS	Dunn Furrugia Racing	18	10	-	10	10	11	-	16	75
6	Ross Almond	26	Mitsubishi Lancer Evo III	Ross Almond	11	4	5	7	-	7	11	10	55
7	Garry Waldon	27; 28	Ferrari F355 Challenge	Positive Hype Pty Ltd; Palmer Motorsport	20	-	-	-	-	-	18	-	38
8	Alfredo Costanzo	10	Maserati Ghibli Cup	Cisco System Maserati	6	8	-	-	7	7	-	-	28
9	Ray Lintott	5	Dodge Viper GTS	Wagon Wheels Chrysler Jeep	-	12	-	-	-	-	-	12	24
10	John Smith	77	Porsche 993 RSCS	G Hassler	-	-	-	18	-	-	-	-	18
11	John Bourke	9	Toyota Supra RZ		-	6	-	-	10	-	-	-	16
11	Neal Bates	5	Dodge Viper GTS		-	-	-	-	16	-	-	-	16
13	Peter McKay	10	Maserati Ghibli Cup	Cisco System Maserati	-	-	-	7	-	-	-	5	12
14	Paul Freestone	14	Lotus Esprit		-	-	11	-	-	-	-	-	11
14	Gerhard Hassler	88	Porsche 993 RSCS	Gerhard Hassler	-	-	-	-	-	11	-	-	11
16	Kevin Weeks	70	Porsche 993 RSCS	Kevin Weeks	-	-	-	-	-	8	-	-	8
17	Carlos Rolfo	22	Nissan 300ZX	Carlos Rolfo	-	-	-	2	-	-	-	-	2
Class B : High Performance Cars
1	Andrej Pavicevic	11	Subaru Impreza WRX	Andrej Pavicevic	27	30	30	20	30	27	30	30	224
2	Chris Kousparis	6	Subaru Impreza WRX	Nepean EFI	20	22	22	30	24	27	20	12	177
3	Ian McAlister	66	Volvo 850 T5R	Ian McAlister	11	12	12	20	11	12	10	14	102
4	Murray Carter	18	Nissan 200SX Turbo	Murray Carter	14	12	20	-	10	20	-	-	76
5	Colin Osborne	13	Toyota MR2 Bathurst	Osborne Motor Sport	7	7	7	11	16	10	14	-	72
5	Peter Boylan	7	Subaru Impreza WRX	PM Boylan	18	16	-	-	-	-	18	20	72
7	Anthony Robson	49	Toyota MR2 Bathurst	Osborne Motor Sport	5	10	10	6	16	8	-	15	69
8	John Cowley	2	HSV GTSR	JT Cowley	-	5	7	20	-	16	10	10	68
9	Guy Gibbons	35	Subaru Impreza WRX	Guy Gibbons	11	10	18	-	-	-	-	-	39
10	Wayne Park	2	HSV GTSR	JC Motorsport	15	-	-	-	-	-	-	-	15
11	Richard Davis	25	HSV GTSR	Richard Davis	-	-	-	-	-	6	-	-	6
Class C : Production Cars Over 2500cc
1	Chris Sexton	99	Ford EL Falcon XR6	Prodrive Racing	30	-	30	27	22	12	27	-	148
2	Denis Cribbin	99; 38	Ford EL Falcon XR6	Prodrive Racing	-	30	-	-	22	-	-	24	76
3	Robert Chadwick	20	Mitsubishi TE Magna	Robert Chadwick	-	-	-	-	-	30	10	8	48
4	Paul Gover	44	Ford EL Falcon XR6	Prodrive Racing	-	-	-	-	30	-	-	-	30
4	Mark Cohen	55	Holden VS Commodore SS	M Cohen	-	-	-	-	-	-	-	30	30
6	Michael Stahl	44	Ford EL Falcon XR6	Prodrive Racing	-	-	-	27	-	-	-	-	27
6	Tony Cross	44	Ford EL Falcon XR6	Prodrive Racing	-	-	-	-	-	-	27	-	27
8	Chris Nixon	44	Ford EL Falcon XR6	Prodrive Racing	-	-	-	-	-	22	-	-	22
9	Toby Hagon	44	Ford EL Falcon XR6	Prodrive Racing	-	-	-	-	-	-	-	20	20
Class D : Production Cars 1851 - 2500cc
1	Beric Lynton	23	BMW 323i	Beric Lynton BMW	30	30	27	25	20	27	24	22	205
2	Troy Searle	15	BMW 323i	Roadchill Express	22	10	20	23	30	27	30	22	184
3	Phil Kirkham	71	Mazda 626	Rebound Clothing Company	22	24	25	12	24	20	-	30	157
4	Peter Phelan	16	Peugeot 405 Mi16	P Phelan	-	10	18	14	14	-	-	-	56
5	Allan Letcher	33	Honda Civic VTiR	Burswood Motorsport	16	-	-	22	-	-	-	-	38
6	Jamie Cartwright	71	Mazda 626	Rebound Clothing Company	-	-	-	-	-	-	20	-	20
7	David Wood	16	Peugeot 405 Mi16	P Phelan	-	-	-	-	-	-	-	16	16
8	Chris Smith	33	Honda Civic VTiR	Burswood Motorsport	-	-	-	-	14	-	-	-	14
Class E : Production Cars 0 - 1850cc
1	Trevor Haines	17; 60	Ford Laser TX3	T Haynes; Carlos Rolfo	-	-	30	27	24	27	24	22	154
2	Nigel Stones	42	Suzuki Swift GTi	Nigel Stones	-	-	-	27	30	27	30	30	144
3	Carlos Rolfo	22	Ford Laser TX3; Suzuki Swift GTi	Carlos Rolfo	30	30	-	-	-	-	20	22	102
4	Jason Veltruski	14	Suzuki Swift GTi	J Veltruski	-	-	-	-	-	-	-	16	16
