= 1998 Australian GT Production Car Championship =

The 1998 Australian GT Production Car Championship was a CAMS sanctioned motor racing title for drivers of Group 3E Series Production Cars. The championship, which was promoted by Procar Australia, was the third Australian GT Production Car Championship.

== Calendar ==
The title was contested over an eight-round series with two races per round.

Round	Circuit	State	Date
1	Calder Park	Victoria	5 April
2	Oran Park	New South Wales	26 April
3	Phillip Island	Victoria	17 May
4	Eastern Creek	New South Wales	7 June
5	Lakeside	Queensland	28 June
6	Mallala	South Australia	19 July
7	Winton	Victoria	9 August
8	Oran Park	New South Wales	30 August

The final round had been scheduled to be run at Amaroo Park on 30 August but was moved to Oran Park on the same date.

== Points system ==
Championship points were awarded on a 15-12-10-8-6-5-4-3-2-1 basis to the first ten classified finishers in each race. A bonus point was awarded to the driver setting pole position at each round.

Points for the five class titles were awarded on a similar basis but with no bonus point for pole position.

== Results ==
Position	Driver	No.	Car	Entrant	R1	R2	R3	R4	R5	R6	R7	R8	Total
1	Domenic Beninca	52	Porsche 911 RSCS	Beninca Motors	31	20	20	24	18	26	18	29	186
2	Peter Fitzgerald	1	Porsche 911 RSCS	Falken Tyres	20	23	25	20	18	24	24	18	172
3	Gary Waldon	5	Dodge Viper GTS	Gary Waldon Racing	13	25	31	27	27	-	-	-	123
4	Rodney Forbes	85	Porsche 911 RSCS	Bob Forbes Corporation Pty Ltd	-	16	6	10	10	26	25	22	115
5	John Bowe	27	Ferrari F355 Challenge	Ross Palmer Motorsport	24	20	-	-	29	-	25	15	113
6	Paul Stokell	50	Lotus Elise Sport	Monarch Motor Imports Pty Ltd	8	4	10	-	-	12	12	14	60
7	Ross Almond	26	Mitsubishi Lancer RS Evo V	Ross Almond	8	7	8	10	-	-	3	3	39
8	Alfredo Costanzo	3	Maserati Ghibli Cup	House of Maserati	16	-	6	6	-	-	9	-	37
9	Neil Crompton	27	Ferrari F355 Challenge	Ross Palmer Motorsport	-	-	16	13	-	-	-	-	29
10	Terry Bosnjak	12	Mazda RX-7 SP	Terry Bosnjak	-	-	-	-	12	16	-	-	28
11	Dean Canto	44	Subaru Impreza WRX	Edge Motor Sport	-	-	5	4	3	5	2	7	26
12	Chris Kousparis	6	Subaru Impreza WRX	Nepean EFI	1	1	-	2	6	8	3	4	25
13	Murray Carter	18	Nissan 200SX Turbo	Murray Carter	2	3	-	7	-	5	3	4	24
14	Ross Halliday	17	Mitsubishi Lancer RS Evo V	Ross Almond	-	-	-	-	-	10	-	11	21
15	Peter McKay	3	Maserati Ghibli Cup	House of Maserati	-	10	-	-	-	-	-	4	14
16	Chris Smith	30	Ferrari F355 Challenge	C Smith	-	-	-	6	4	-	-	-	10
17	Ed Aitken	8	Porsche 911 RSCS		-	-	-	-	-	-	9	-	9
18	John Bourke	9	Toyota Supra RZ		8	-	-	-	-	-	-	-	8
18	Peter Boylan	7	Subaru Impreza WRX	Peter Boylan	-	-	-	4	2	2	-	-	8
20	John Trimbole	47	Mitsubishi Lancer RS Evo III	Daily Planet	-	2	3	-	1	-	-	-	6
21	Bob Thorn	64	Toyota Supra RZ	Supercheap Auto Racing	2	3	-	-	-	-	-	-	5
21	Michael Simpson	32	BMW 323i	Bruce Lynton	-	-	-	-	3	-	-	2	5
23	Craig Dean	41	Toyota Soarer Turbo	Crossover Car Conversions	-	-	3	1	-	-	-	-	4
24	John Cowley	2	HSV VS GTS-R	John Cowley	-	-	-	1	-	1	-	-	2
25	Marcus Marshall	24	Nissan 300ZX		1	-	-	-	-	-	-	-	1
25	Mark King	34	Mitsubishi Lancer RS Evo III		-	-	-	-	-	-	1	-	1
25	Luke Searle	15	BMW 323i	Roadchill Express	-	-	-	-	-	-	-	1	1

=== Classes ===
Position	Driver	No.	Car	Entrant	Total
Class A : Super Cars
1	Domenic Beninca	52	Porsche 911 RSCS	Beninca Motors	181
2	Peter Fitzgerald	1	Porsche 911 RSCS	Falken Tyres	171
3	Gary Waldon	5	Dodge Viper GTS	Gary Waldon Racing	121
4	Rodney Forbes	85	Porsche 911 RSCS	Bob Forbes Corporation Pty Ltd	114
5	John Bowe	27	Ferrari F355 Challenge	Ross Palmer Motorsport	107
6	Paul Stokell	50	Lotus Elise Sport	Monarch Motor Imports Pty Ltd	60
7	Ross Almond	26	Mitsubishi Lancer RS Evo V	Ross Almond	42
8	Alfredo Costanzo	3	Maserati Ghibli Cup	House of Maserati	40
9	Neil Crompton	27	Ferrari F355 Challenge	Ross Palmer Motorsport	30
10	Terry Bosnjak	12	Mazda RX-7 SP	Terry Bosnjak	28
11	Craig Dean	41	Toyota Soarer Turbo	Crossover Car Conversions	25
12	Ross Halliday	17	Mitsubishi Lancer RS Evo V	Ross Almond	21
13	Peter McKay	3	Maserati Ghibli Cup	House of Maserati	14
14	Bob Thorn	64	Toyota Supra RZ	Supercheap Auto Racing	12
15	Chris Smith	30	Ferrari F355 Challenge	C Smith	10
16	Ed Aitken	8	Porsche 911 RSCS		9
17	John Bourke	9	Toyota Supra RZ		8
18	Marcus Marshall	24	Nissan 300ZX		1
Class B : High Performance Cars
1	Chris Kousparis	6	Subaru Impreza WRX	Nepean EFI	169
2	Murray Carter	18	Nissan 200SX Turbo	Murray Carter	165
3	Dean Canto	44	Subaru Impreza WRX	Edge Motor Sport	161
4	Peter Boylan	7	Subaru Impreza WRX	Peter Boylan	109
5	John Trimbole	47	Mitsubishi Lancer RS Evo III	Daily Planet	54
6	John Cowley	2	HSV VS GTS-R	John Cowley	50
7	Richard Davis	25	HSV VS GTS-R	Jayco Caravans	47
8	Mark King	34	Mitsubishi Lancer RS Evo III		18
9	Trevor Haines	61	Subaru Impreza WRX		8
Class C : Production Cars (Over 2500cc)
1	David Ratcliff	88	Toyota Camry CSi	Phoenix Motorsport	195
2	Mark Cohen	55	Holden VS Commodore SS	Mark Cohen	162
3	Robert Chadwick	20	Mitsubishi TE Magna	Robert Chadwick	146
4	Jim Myhill	21	Mitsubishi TE Magna	Robert Chadwick	82
5	Steve Knight	21	Mitsubishi TE Magna	Robert Chadwick	40
6	John Wright	28	Ford EL Falcon XR8	Ross Palmer Motorsport	22
7	Wayne Webster	28	Ford EL Falcon XR8	Ross Palmer Motorsport	22
8	Guy Andrews	28	Ford EL Falcon XR8	Ross Palmer Motorsport	18
9	Peter McKay	28	Ford EL Falcon XR8	Ross Palmer Motorsport	18
10	Paula Elstrek	28	Ford EL Falcon XR8	Ross Palmer Motorsport	16
11	Paul Gover	28	Ford EL Falcon XR8	Ross Palmer Motorsport	15
12	Joshua Dowling	28	Ford EL Falcon XR8	Ross Palmer Motorsport	12
13	Sam Newman	28	Ford EL Falcon XR8	Ross Palmer Motorsport	12
Class D : Production Cars (1851 - 2500cc)
1	Ric Shaw	35	Toyota MR2 Bathurst	Osborne Motorsport	175
2	Michael Simpson	32	BMW 323i	Bruce Lynton	145
3	Phil Kirkham	71	Mazda 626	Rebound Clothing Company	140
4	Colin Osborne	13	Toyota MR2 Bathurst	Osborne Motorsport	134
5	Luke Searle	15	BMW 323i	Roadchill Express	117
6	Clayton Haynes	4	Toyota MR2 GT	Hard Toys Racing	52
7	Carol Jackson	10	Honda Civic VTi-R	Pace Racing Pty Ltd	37
8	Allan Letcher	33	Honda Civic VTi-R	Burswood Motorsport	23
9	Peter Phelan	16	Peugeot 405 Mi16		12
Class E : Production Cars (0 - 1850cc)
1	Nigel Stones	42	Suzuki Swift GTi	Nigel Stones	229
2	Aaron McGill	75	Suzuki Swift GTi	Aaron McGill	163
3	Kosi Kalaitzidis	22	Proton M21 Coupe	K Kalaitzidis	92
4	Danny Brian	98	Suzuki Swift GTi	P Steer	68
5	Darren Best	78	Hyundai Excel Sprint	D Best	48
6	Nigel Williams	98	Suzuki Swift GTi		28
7	Jim Myhill	97	Ford Laser TX3		22
8	Clayton Haynes	4	Suzuki Swift GTi		18
9	Don Pulver	76	Suzuki Swift GTi		10
