= 1996 Australian GT Production Car Championship =

The 1996 Australian GT Production Car Championship was a CAMS sanctioned motor racing title for drivers of Group 3E Series Production Cars. Organised and promoted by Procar Australia, it was the inaugural Australian GT Production Car Championship.

The championship was won by Cameron McConville driving a Porsche 911 RSCS.

== Calendar ==
The championship was contested over an eight-round series with two races per round.

Round	Circuit	State	Date
1	Amaroo Park	New South Wales	18 May
2	Lakeside	Queensland	23 June
3	Amaroo Park	New South Wales	14 July
4	Mallala	South Australia	11 August
5	Winton	Victoria	25 August
6	Phillip Island	Victoria	22 September
7	Lakeside	Queensland	27 October
8	Oran Park	New South Wales	8 November

== Points system ==
Outright championship points were awarded on a 15–12–10–8–6–5–4–3–2–1 basis to the top ten finishers in each race with a bonus point awarded to the driver setting pole position for each round. Class points were awarded on the same basis to the top ten class finishers in each race but with no bonus point for pole position.

== Championship standings ==
Position	Driver	No	Car	Entrant	Ama	Lak	Ama	Mal	Win	Phi	Lak	Ora	Total
1	Cameron McConville	22	Porsche 911 RSCS	Warwick Fabrics (Aust) P/L	23	18	20	28	18	27	31	31	196
2	Jim Richards	1	Porsche 911 RSCS	Jim Richards	27	30	28	20	31	10	20	22	188
3	Peter Fitzgerald	3	Porsche 911 RSCS	Falken Tyres	20	20	27	27	25	25	20	18	182
4	Jim Zerefos	5	Lotus Esprit	Monarch Motor Imports	11	12	14	16	10	12	6	14	95
5	John Bowe	10	Ferrari F355 Challenge	Positive Hype Pty Ltd	14	24	9	–	–	–	13	19	79
6	Chris Kousparis	6	Mazda 626	Nepean EFI	6	6	10	4	4	11	7	5	53
7	Darren Palmer	15	Subaru Impreza WRX	Ross Palmer Motorsport P/L	–	–	6	12	11	–	13	10	52
8	Murray Carter	18	Mazda 626	Murray Carter	6	8	8	6	2	14	–	5	49
9	John Bourke	20	Subaru Impreza WRX	John Bourke	9	10	–	–	14	–	–	–	33
10	Beric Lynton	23	BMW 323i	Bruce Lynton BMW	–	2	5	2	3	10	–	5	27
11	Peter Boylan	7	Subaru Impreza WRX	Peter M Boylan	–	–	–	8	8	–	4	5	25
12	Russell Paterson	37	Porsche 968 CS	Russell Paterson	–	–	5	10	2	–	3	–	20
13	Andrej Pavicevic	11	Suzuki Swift GTi	Andrej Pavicevic	3	3	1	–	4	1	7	–	19
14	Terry Bosnjak	41	Porsche 911 RSCS		14	–	–	–	–	–	–	–	14
15	Chris Sexton	99	Ford EF Falcon XR6	Prodrive Racing	–	–	–	–	–	9	3	–	12
16	John Cowley	2	Ford EF Falcon XR6	John Cowley	–	–	–	–	–	7	2	–	9
16	Denis Cribbin	33	Holden VP Commodore SS	Denis Cribbin	–	–	–	–	–	5	4	–	9
18	Tim Shaw	36	Nissan Pulsar SSS	Tim Shaw	–	–	–	–	–	3	–	–	3
19	Paul Flottmann	44	Nissan Pulsar SSS	Paul Flottmann	–	1	1	–	–	–	–	–	2
19	Ryan McLeod	43	Suzuki Swift GTi	Ryan McLeod	–	–	–	–	1	–	1	–	2
21	Ken Talbert	34	Mazda 626	Ken Talbert	1	–	–	–	–	–	–	–	1
21	Nick Bacon	12	Suzuki Swift GTi	Prodrive Racing	–	–	–	–	1	–	–	–	1

=== Class placings ===
Position	Driver	No	Car	Entrant	Total
Class A : Super Cars
1	Cameron McConville	22	Porsche 911 RSCS	Warwick Fabrics (Aust) P/L	193
2	Jim Richards	1	Porsche 911 RSCS	Jim Richards	186
3	Peter Fitzgerald	3	Porsche 911 RSCS	Falken Tyres	179
4	Jim Zerefos	5	Lotus Esprit	Monarch Motor Imports	105
5	John Bowe	10	Ferrari F355 Challenge	Positive Hype Pty Ltd	82
6	Russell Paterson	37	Porsche 968 CS	Russell Paterson	34
7	Terry Bosnjak		Porsche 911 RSCS		12
Class B : High Performance Cars, 4WD and turbo
1	John Bourke	20	Subaru Impreza WRX	John Bourke	130
2	Darren Palmer	15	Subaru Impreza WRX	Ross Palmer Motorsport P/L	129
3	Peter Boylan	7	Subaru Impreza WRX	Peter M Boylan	101
Class C : Production Cars Over 2500cc
1	Chris Sexton	99	Ford EF Falcon XR6	Prodrive Racing	192
2	John Cowley	2	Ford EF Falcon XR6	John Cowley	156
3	Denis Cribbin	33	Holden VP Commodore SS	Denis Cribbin	154
4	Ian McAlister	66	Ford EB Falcon SS		126
Class D : Production Cars 1851 – 2500cc
1	Chris Kousparis	6	Mazda 626	Nepean EFI	212
2	Murray Carter	18	Mazda 626	Murray Carter	184
3	Beric Lynton	23	BMW 323i	Bruce Lynton BMW	120
4	Paul Flottmann	44	Nissan Pulsar SSS	Paul Flottmann	48
5	Ken Talbert	34	Mazda 626	Ken Talbert	34
6	Tim Shaw	36	Nissan Pulsar SSS	Tim Shaw	29
7	Jenni Thompson				24
8	Alan Letcher		Honda Civic VTi-R		12
Class E : Production Cars 0–1850cc
1	Andrej Pavicevic	11	Suzuki Swift GTi	Andrej Pavicevic	225
2	Nick Bacon	12	Suzuki Swift GTi	Prodrive Racing	154
3	Ryan McLeod	43	Suzuki Swift GTi	Ryan McLeod	132
4	Damien White	13	Suzuki Swift GTi	Skilled Engineering	88
5	Carlos Rolfo	9	Ford Laser TX3	CR Motorsport	69
6	Kevin Ledger		Ford Laser TX3		22
7	Darren Palmer		Suzuki Swift GTi	Ross Palmer Motorsport P/L	18
