= 1994 Australian Super Production Car Series =

The 1994 Australian Super Production Car Series was an Australian motor racing competition for production cars. It was the first and only series to be contested under the Australian Super Production Car Series name prior to the adoption of "Australian GT Production Car Series" for 1995 and subsequently "Australian GT Production Car Championship" for 1996.

The 1994 series differed from the 1994 Australian Production Car Championship in that it was open to cars more closely aligned with the James Hardie 12 Hour rather than restricted to the under 2.5 litre front wheel drive cars which were eligible for the Production Car Championship. It was won by Brad Jones driving a Lotus Esprit.

== Schedule ==
The series was contested over six rounds with one race per round. Each round was a support race to a round of the 1994 Australian Manufacturers' Championship.

Round	Circuit	Date	Round winner	Car
1	Eastern Creek	17 April	Brad Jones	Lotus Esprit
2	Phillip Island	22 May	Brad Jones	Lotus Esprit
3	Winton	19 June	Brad Jones	Lotus Esprit
4	Lakeside	17 July	Gregg Hansford	Mazda RX-7
5	Mallala	7 August	Jim Richards	Porsche 968CS
6	Oran Park	28 August	Gary Waldon	Mazda RX-7

== Results ==
Position	Driver	Car	Entrant	Eas	Phi	Win	Lak	Mal	Ora	Total
1	Brad Jones	Lotus Esprit	Lotus Cars Australia	20	20	20	15	-	-	75
2	Tim Grant	Porsche 968CS	Alf Grant Racing	12	10	10	10	15	10	67
3	Peter Fitzgerald	Porsche 968CS	Falken Tyres	15	15	15	-	-	15	60
4	Jim Richards	Porsche 968CS	Jim Richards	-	-	12	12	20	12	56
5	Peter Bradbury	Porsche 968CS	Peter Bradbury	-	8	8	8	12	6	42
6	Nicholas Leutwiler	Porsche 968CS		10	12	-	-	-	-	22
7	Gregg Hansford	Mazda RX-7		-	-	-	20	-	-	20
=	Gary Waldon	Mazda RX-7		-	-	-	-	-	20	20
9	John Bourke	Subaru Impreza WRX	John Bourke	8	-	-	-	-	3	11
10	Steve Swaine	Holden Commodore VP		-	4	6	-	-	-	10
11	Keith Carling	Mazda RX-7		-	-	-	-	-	8	8
12	Tony Scott	Volvo 850 T-5		6	-	-	-	-	-	6
=	Mal Rose	Ford Falcon		-	6	-	-	-	-	6
=	Chris Sexton	Ford Falcon XR6		-	-	-	6	-	-	6
15	Kevin Burton	Ford Falcon SS		4	-	-	-	-	-	4
=	Chris Hinton			-	-	-	4	-	-	4
=	Jeremy Norris	Porsche 968CS		-	-	-	-	-	4	4
18	Ron Masing	Mitsubishi Lancer		3	-	-	-	-	-	3
19	Darryl Dixon	Ford Falcon S		2	-	-	-	-	-	2
