= Supercheap Auto Racing =

Supercheap Auto Racing was the sponsored identity of several Australian based racing teams from the mid-1990s when automotive parts retail chain Supercheap Auto began sponsoring motor racing teams. The identity has travelled from one racing team to another as the chain transferred its sponsorship. The most recent holder of the Supercheap Auto Racing identity was Supercars Championship team Triple Eight Race Engineering's Bathurst Wildcard in 2021.

== Results ==
Year	Series	Team	Car	Drivers
1997	Australian Super Touring Championship	CPW Motorsport	BMW 318i	13 Wayne Wakefield; 27 Steven Johnson; 64 Jason Richards
1998	Australian GT Production Car Championship	BRT Motorsport	Toyota Supra	64 Bob Thorn
1999	Shell Championship Series	Briggs Motor Sport	Ford Falcon AU; Ford Falcon EL	70 John Briggs; 80 Bob Thorn
2000	Shell Championship Series	Steven Ellery Racing	Ford Falcon AU	31 Steven Ellery
2001	Shell Championship Series	Steven Ellery Racing	Ford Falcon AU	31 Steven Ellery
2002	V8 Supercar Championship Series	Steven Ellery Racing	Ford Falcon AU	31 Steven Ellery
2003	V8 Supercar Championship Series	Steven Ellery Racing	Ford Falcon BA	31 Steven Ellery
2004	V8 Supercar Championship Series	Steven Ellery Racing	Ford Falcon BA	31 Steven Ellery
2005	V8 Supercar Championship Series	Paul Weel Racing	Holden Commodore VZ	50 Paul Weel; 51 Greg Murphy
2006	V8 Supercar Championship Series	Paul Weel Racing	Holden Commodore VZ	50 Cameron McConville; 51 Greg Murphy
2007	V8 Supercar Championship Series	Paul Weel Racing	Holden Commodore VZ; Holden Commodore VE	20 Paul Dumbrell; 50 Cameron McConville
2008	V8 Supercar Championship Series	Paul Morris Motorsport	Holden Commodore VE	39 Russell Ingall; 67 Paul Morris
2009	V8 Supercar Championship Series	Paul Morris Motorsport	Holden Commodore VE	39 Russell Ingall; 67 Tim Slade
2010	V8 Supercar Championship Series	Paul Morris Motorsport	Holden Commodore VE	39 Russell Ingall
2011	International V8 Supercars Championship	Paul Morris Motorsport	Holden Commodore VE	39 Russell Ingall
2012	International V8 Supercars Championship	Walkinshaw Racing	Holden Commodore VE	66 Russell Ingall
2013	International V8 Supercars Championship	Walkinshaw Racing	Holden Commodore VE	66 Russell Ingall
2014	International V8 Supercars Championship	Walkinshaw Racing	Holden Commodore VF	47 Tim Slade
2015	International V8 Supercars Championship	Walkinshaw Racing	Holden Commodore VF	47 Tim Slade
2016	Supercars Championship	Rod Nash Racing	Ford Falcon FG X	55 Chaz Mostert
2017	Supercars Championship	Rod Nash Racing	Ford Falcon FG X	55 Chaz Mostert
2018	Supercars Championship	Tickford Racing	Ford Falcon FG X	55 Chaz Mostert
2019	Supercars Championship	Tickford Racing	Ford Mustang	55 Chaz Mostert
2020	Supercars Championship	Tickford Racing	Ford Mustang	55 Jack Le Brocq
2021	Supercars Championship	Triple Eight Race Engineering	Holden Commodore ZB	39 Russell Ingall; Broc Feeney
2022	Supercars Championship	Triple Eight Race Engineering	Holden Commodore ZB	888 Craig Lowndes; Declan Fraser
2023	Supercars Championship	Triple Eight Race Engineering	Chevrolet Camaro Mk.6	888 Craig Lowndes; Zane Goddard
2024	Supercars Championship	Triple Eight Race Engineering	Chevrolet Camaro Mk.6	888 Craig Lowndes; Cooper Murray
2025	Supercars Championship	Triple Eight Race Engineering	Chevrolet Camaro Mk.6	888 Craig Lowndes; Zach Bates

- Wildcards are listed in Italics

=== Bathurst 1000 results ===
Year	No.	Team	Car	Drivers	Pos.	Laps
1999	70	Briggs Motor Sport	Ford Falcon AU	(Australia) John Briggs (Australia) Tim Leahey	DNF	116
1999	80	Briggs Motor Sport	Ford Falcon EL	(Australia) Bob Thorn (Australia) Todd Wanless	DNF	19
2000	31	Steven Ellery Racing	Ford Falcon AU	(Australia) Steven Ellery (Australia) Paul Stokell	DNF	82
2001	31	Steven Ellery Racing	Ford Falcon AU	(Australia) Steven Ellery (Australia) Geoff Brabham	7th	161
2002	31	Steven Ellery Racing	Ford Falcon AU	(Australia) Steven Ellery (Australia) Luke Youlden	9th	160
2003	31	Steven Ellery Racing	Ford Falcon BA	(Australia) Steven Ellery (Australia) Luke Youlden	3rd	161
2004	31	Steven Ellery Racing	Ford Falcon BA	(Australia) Steven Ellery (Australia) Luke Youlden	16th	158
2005	50	Paul Weel Racing	Holden Commodore VZ	(Australia) Owen Kelly (Australia) Nathan Pretty	6th	161
2005	51	Paul Weel Racing	Holden Commodore VZ	(New Zealand) Greg Murphy (Australia) Paul Weel	DNF	144
2006	50	Paul Weel Racing	Holden Commodore VZ	(Australia) Paul Weel (Australia) Nathan Pretty	8th	161
2006	51	Paul Weel Racing	Holden Commodore VZ	(New Zealand) Greg Murphy (Australia) Cameron McConville	DNF	104
2007	20	Paul Weel Racing	Holden Commodore VE	(Australia) Paul Dumbrell (Australia) Paul Weel	12th	161
2007	50	Paul Weel Racing	Holden Commodore VE	(Australia) Cameron McConville (Australia) David Reynolds	DNS	0
2008	39	Paul Morris Motorsport	Holden Commodore VE	(Australia) Russell Ingall (Australia) Paul Morris	18th	156
2008	67	Paul Morris Motorsport	Holden Commodore VE	(United Kingdom) Matt Neal (United States) Boris Said	DNF	140
2009	39	Paul Morris Motorsport	Holden Commodore VE	(Australia) Russell Ingall (Australia) Owen Kelly	15th	160
2009	67	Paul Morris Motorsport	Holden Commodore VE	(Australia) Tim Slade (Australia) Paul Morris	7th	161
2010	39	Paul Morris Motorsport	Holden Commodore VE	(Australia) Russell Ingall (Australia) Paul Morris	8th	161
2011	200	Paul Morris Motorsport	Holden Commodore VE	(Australia) Russell Ingall (Australia) Jack Perkins	8th	161
2012	66	Walkinshaw Racing	Holden Commodore VE	(Australia) Russell Ingall (Austria) Christian Klien	9th	161
2013	66	Walkinshaw Racing	Holden Commodore VF	(Australia) Russell Ingall (Australia) Ryan Briscoe	17th	161
2014	10	Walkinshaw Racing	Holden Commodore VF	(Australia) Tim Slade (Australia) Tony D'Alberto	DNF	102
2015	47	Walkinshaw Racing	Holden Commodore VF	(Australia) Tim Slade (Australia) Tony D'Alberto	14th	161
2016	55	Rod Nash Racing	Ford Falcon FG X	(Australia) Chaz Mostert (Australia) Steve Owen	19th	147
2017	55	Rod Nash Racing	Ford Falcon FG X	(Australia) Chaz Mostert (Australia) Steve Owen	10th	161
2018	55	Tickford Racing	Ford Falcon FG X	(Australia) Chaz Mostert (Australia) James Moffat	4th	161
2019	55	Tickford Racing	Ford Mustang GT	(Australia) Chaz Mostert (Australia) James Moffat	15th	160
2020	55	Tickford Racing	Ford Mustang GT	(Australia) Jack Le Brocq (Australia) James Moffat	14th	161
2021	39	Triple Eight Race Engineering	Holden Commodore ZB	(Australia) Broc Feeney (Australia) Russell Ingall	DNF	142
2022	888	Triple Eight Race Engineering	Holden Commodore ZB	(Australia) Declan Fraser (Australia) Craig Lowndes		
