= 1995 Australian GT Production Car Series =

The 1995 Australian GT Production Car Series was an Australian motor racing series for production cars. It was the first and only series to be contested under the Australian GT Production Car Series name. The series was however preceded by the 1994 Australian Super Production Car Series with the Super Production category being renamed to GT Production for 1995 and the series gaining national title status to become the Australian GT Production Car Championship in 1996. The 1995 series was won by Jim Richards driving a Porsche 968CS and a Porsche 911 RSCS.

== Schedule ==
The series was contested over six rounds with two races per round.

Round	Circuit	State	Date
1	Phillip Island	Victoria	5 March
2	Oran Park	New South Wales	2 April
3	Symmons Plains	Tasmania	7 May
4	Calder	Victoria	13 May
5	Mallala	South Australia	4 June
6	Lakeside	Queensland	23 July

== Results ==
Position	Driver	No	Car	Entrant	Phi	Ora	Sym	Cal	Mal	Lak	Total
1	Jim Richards	5	Porsche 968CS; Porsche 911 RSCS	Bob Jane T Mart	35	22	40	35	35	35	202
2	Peter Fitzgerald	3	Porsche 968CS; Porsche 911 RSCS	Falken Tyres	27	16	27	32	35	35	172
3	Jim Zerefos	10	Lotus Esprit	Monarch Motor Imports	-	30	15	20	24	18	107
4	Gary Waldon		Mazda RX-7; Mazda RX-7 SP	Mazda Motorsport	20	40	20	16	-	-	96
5	Paul Morris	32	BMW M3-R	Paul Morris Motorsport	-	16	20	20	-	-	56
6	Greg Crick	8	Honda NSX	Ross Palmer Motorsport	-	-	-	14	12	14	40
7	Geoff Morgan	4	Porsche 911 RSCS	Geoff Morgan	-	-	11	8	18	-	37
8	Jeremy Norris		Porsche 968CS		18	8	-	-	-	-	26
9	Brett Peters	41	Porsche 968CS	Bob Jane T Marts	-	-	8	6	8	-	22
9	John Smith	4	Porsche 911 RSCS	Geoff Morgan	-	-	-	-	-	22	22
11	Ross Palmer		Honda NSX		8	6	7	-	-	-	21
12	Dick Johnson	7	Mazda RX-7 SP	Mazda Motorsport	-	-	-	8	-	12	20
13	John Nicholls	11	Porsche 911 RSCS	John Nicholls	-	-	-	-	18	-	18
14	Alan Jones		Mazda RX-7	Mazda Motorsport	-	14	-	-	-	-	14
15	Terry Bosnjak	27	Mazda RX-7; Mazda RX-7 SP	Hatfield Engineering	-	6	6	-	-	-	12
16	John Bowe		Mazda RX-7	Mazda Motorsport	10	-	-	-	-	-	10
17	Russell Paterson		Porsche 968CS		4	-	5	-	-	-	9
18	Matthew Martin	33	Porsche 968	Falken Tyres	-	-	-	3	-	-	3
Class B
1	Chris Sexton	99	Ford ED Falcon XR6	Chris Sexton	-	40	40	40	-	30	150
2	Guy Gibbons		Subaru Impreza WRX		40	-	-	-	-	-	40
2	Vaughan Hatcher				-	-	-	-	40	-	40
2	Tony Scott		Holden VP Commodore SS		-	-	-	-	-	40	40
5	John Cowley		Ford ED Falcon XR6		-	-	-	-	-	24	24
Class C
1	Milton Leslight	16	Peugeot 405	Milton Leslight	-	-	20	40	40	-	100
2	Gwenda Searle		Toyota Celica ZR; Toyota MR2		-	40	-	-	-	-	40
