= 1992 Australian Production Car Championship =

The 1992 Australian Production Car Championship was a CAMS sanctioned motor racing title for drivers of Group 3E Series Production Cars. The title, which was the sixth Australian Production Car Championship was contested over an eight-round series with one race per round.

== Calendar ==
- Round 1, Sandown, Victoria, 8 March
- Round 2, Winton, Victoria, 5 April
- Round 3, Symmons Plains, Tasmania, 26 April
- Round 4, Mallala, South Australia, 31 May
- Round 5, Oran Park, New South Wales, 21 June
- Round 6, Lakeside, Queensland, 5 July
- Round 7, Eastern Creek, New South Wales, 2 August
- Round 8, Mount Panorama, Bathurst, New South Wales, 3 October

== Points system ==
Outright championship points were awarded on a 20–15–12–10–8–6–4–3–2–1 basis to the top ten finishers in each round. Each driver could only retain his/her best seven round results. Class points for drivers of Under 2000cc Front Wheel Drive class cars were awarded on a 9-6-4-3-2-1 basis to the top six class finishers at each round.

== Results ==
Position	Driver	No.	Car	Entrant	R1	R2	R3	R4	R5	R6	R7	R8	Total
1	Terry Lewis	27; 11	Holden VP Commodore SS	Terry Lewis	20	12	8	20	12	12	20	(6)	104
2	Terry Bosnjak	41	Holden VP Commodore SS	Caltex CXT Race Team	8	15	-	15	15	15	15	12	95
3	Mal Rose	44	Ford EA Falcon; Ford EB2 Falcon SS	Mal Rose	-	6	15	6	20	20	6	20	93
4	Tony Scott	6	Holden VP Commodore SS	Bridgestone Australia	-	20	20	8	10	8	8	8	82
5	Peter Fitzgerald	3	Holden VP Commodore SS	Goodyear Tyres	15	10	12	12	(8)	10	12	10	81
6	Ken Douglas	10	Ford EA Falcon; Ford EB2 Falcon SS	Robinson Racing Developments	10	8	10	-	-	4	10	15	57
7	Kent Youlden	1	Ford EA Falcon; Ford EB2 Falcon SS	Kent Youlden	12	2	6	10	6	6	-	-	42
8	Ian Palmer	7	Holden VP Commodore SS	Palmer Tube Mills	4	1	-	2	3	2	3	3	18
8	Murray Carter	18	Nissan Pulsar SSS	Murray Carter	-	-	-	3	4	3	4	4	18
10	Roland Hill	5	Holden VP Commodore SS	Goodyear Australia	6	3	4	4	-	-	-	-	17
11	Jim Zerefos	2	Ford EA Falcon	Goodyear	3	4	-	-	-	-	-	-	7
12	Don Watson	15	Holden VN Commodore; Holden VP Commodore SS	Don Eatson Pty Ltd	2	-	-	-	-	1	1	2	6
13	Danny Bogut	21	Suzuki Swift GTi	Danny Bogut	-	-	3	1	-	-	-	-	4
14	Geoff Forshaw	43	Ford Laser TX3	Mountain Motorsport	-	-	-	-	1	-	2	-	3
15	Phil Alexander	35	Toyota Corolla	Phil Alexander	-	-	-	-	2	-	-	-	2
16	Peter Vorst		Ford EA Falcon		1	-	-	-	-	-	-	-	1
16	Robert Ogilvie	4	Holden VP Commodore SS	Falken Tyres	-	-	-	-	-	-	-	1	1
Under 2000cc Front Wheel Drive Class
1	Murray Carter	18	Nissan Pulsar SSS	Murray Carter	9	6	-	9	9	9	9	9	60
2	Danny Bogut	21	Suzuki Swift GTi	Danny Bogut	-	3	9	6	-	4	-	-	22
3	Phil Alexander	35	Toyota Corolla	Phil Alexander	4	-	-	-	6	-	4	4	18
4	Geoff Forshaw	43	Ford Laser TX3	Mountain Motorsport	-	-	-	-	4	-	6	6	16
5	Colin Osborne	50; 13	Toyota Corolla	Colin Osborne	1	-	-	4	1	6	2	-	14
6	Chris Kousparis		Toyota Corolla		-	9	-	-	-	-	1	-	10
7	Geoff Perry		Nissan Pintara		6	-	-	-	-	-	-	-	6
8	Glenn Jordan		Suzuki Swift GTi		-	4	-	-	-	-	-	-	4
9	Chris Symonds		Toyota Corolla		3	-	-	-	-	-	-	-	3
9	L King		Toyota Corolla		-	-	-	-	3	-	-	-	3
9	Peter Mitchel		Toyota Corolla		-	-	-	-	-	3	-	-	3
9	Mark Brame		Suzuki Swift		-	-	-	-	-	-	3	-	3
9	Gary Quartly	31	Nissan Pulsar SSS	Gary Quartley	-	-	-	-	-	-	-	3	3
14	Craig Dare		Suzuki Swift		2	-	-	-	-	-	-	-	2
14	Ian Sawtell	71	Suzuki Swift GTi	Ian Sawtell	-	-	-	-	2	-	-	-	2
14	Andrew Hutchison		Suzuki Swift		-	-	-	-	-	2	-	-	2
14	Tony Regan	20	Toyota Corolla	Tony Regan	-	-	-	-	-	-	-	2	2
18	Tom Watkinson	9	Toyota Corolla	Tom Watkinson	-	-	-	-	-	-	-	1	1
