= 1999 Australian GT Production Car Championship =

The 1999 Australian GT Production Car Championship was an Australian motor racing competition open to cars complying with Group 3E Series Production Car regulations. It was the sanctioned by the Confederation of Australian Motor Sport as an Australian title and was the fourth Australian GT Production Car Championship.

The championship was won by Jim Richards driving a Porsche 911 RSCS.

== Calendar ==
The championship was contested over an eight round series with two races per round.

Round	Circuit	State	Date
1	Eastern Creek International Raceway	New South Wales	28 March
2	Phillip Island	Victoria	16 May
3	Hidden Valley	Northern Territory	6 June
4	Sandown International Motor Raceway	Victoria	27 June
5	Queensland Raceway	Queensland	11 July
6	Calder Park	Victoria	25 July
7	Winton	Victoria	22 August
8	Oran Park	New South Wales	5 September

== Points system ==
Outright championship points were awarded on a 15-12-10-8-6-5-4-3-2-1 basis to the top ten outright finishers in each race with an additional point awarded to the driver gaining pole position for each race. Class points were awarded on the same 15-12-10-8-6-5-4-3-2-1 scale to the top ten finishers in each class in each race.

== Standings ==
Position	Driver	No.	Car	Entrant	Eas	Phi	Hid	San	Que	Cal	Win	Ora	Total
1	Jim Richards	5	Porsche 911 RSCS	Jim Richards	18	21.5	29	25	23	22	24	25	187.5
2	Peter Fitzgerald	3	Porsche 911 RSCS	Falken Tyres	25	8	8	20	29	31	17	24	162
3	Domenic Beninca	1; 27	Porsche 911 RSCS; Ferrari F355 Challenge	Beninca Motors; Ross Palmer Motorsport	31	21	25	10	14	-	16	6	123
4	Ed Aitken	8	Porsche 911 RSCS	Ed Aitken	10	4	14	8	18	14	16	11	95
5	Wayne Park	27	Ferrari F355 Challenge	Ross Palmer Motorsport	-	-	22	12	-	23	23	12	92
6	Geoff Morgan	12	Porsche 911 RSCS	Vodafone Network Pty Ltd	6	5	10	12	20	14	8	16	91
7	Garry Waldon	29	Dodge Viper GTS	Garry Waldon	-	-	-	17	-	-	-	15	32
=	Jamie Cartwright	11	Toyota Supra RZ	Car Imports Australia	5	14	10	3	-	-	-	-	32
9	Terry Bosnjak	41	Mazda RX-7	Terry Bosnjak	18	9	-	-	-	-	-	-	27
10	Rod Salmon	38	Mitsubishi Lancer RS Evo V	Rod Salmon	-	2	-	1	8	10	-	3	24
11	Perry Spiridis	30	Maserati Ghibli Cup	Perry Spiridis	10	-	-	12	-	-	-	-	22
12	John Teulan	45	Nissan Skyline GT-R	Statewide GT-R Racing	-	-	-	1	-	2	8	9	20
13	Graham Alexander	57	Mitsubishi Lancer RS Evo V	Graham Alexander	-	3.5	-	-	-	7	2	5	17.5
14	Craig Dean	65	Ford Mustang Saleen S351	Crossover Car Conversions	-	6	-	6	-	5	-	-	17
=	Geoff Full	6	Subaru Impreza WRX	Nepean EFI	1	4	7	-	5	-	-	-	17
16	Beric Lynton	23	BMW M3R	Bruce Lynton	3	-	-	-	5	4	-	4	16
17	Murray Carter	18	Chevrolet Corvette C5	Murray Carter	-	2.5	-	2	8	1	-	-	13.5
18	Ray Lintott	9	Dodge Viper GTS	Wagon Wheels Chrysler Jeep	-	-	-	5	-	-	8	-	13
19	Mark King	34	Mitsubishi Lancer RS Evo III	Mark King	-	-	3	-	2	1	1	2	9
20	Paul Freestone	48	Lotus Esprit Sport 3	Freestone's Racing	-	-	-	-	-	-	8	-	8
21	Paula Elstrek	66	Mazda RX-7	Gregory Jupp	-	-	2	-	-	-	3	-	5
22	Peter Boylan	7	Subaru Impreza WRX; Mitsubishi Lancer RS Evo V	Ross Almond	-	-	3	-	-	-	-	1	4
=	Darren Palmer	27	Ferrari F355 Challenge	Darren Palmer	4	-	-	-	-	-	-	-	4
24	Damien White	38	Mitsubishi Lancer RS Evo V	Rod Salmon	3	-	-	-	-	-	-	-	3
25	Michael Simpson	32	BMW 323i	Bruce Lynton	-	-	-	-	1	-	-	-	1
=	John Cowley	2	HSV VS GTS-R 215i	John T Cowley	-	-	1	-	-	-	-	-	1
=	Ric Shaw	35	Toyota MR2 Bathurst	Osborne Motorsport	-	-	1	-	-	-	-	-	1
=	Bob Hughes	15	Mazda RX-7	Bob Hughes	-	-	-	-	1	-	-	-	1
=	Garry Holt	99	Subaru Impreza WRX	Garry Holt	-	-	-	-	-	-	-	1	1
30	Wayne Vinckx	76	Nissan 200SX	Wayne Vinckx	-	0.5	-	-	-	-	-	-	0.5

=== Class results ===
Position	Driver	No.	Car	Entrant	Total
Class A - Super Cars
1	Jim Richards	5	Porsche 911 RSCS	Jim Richards	185.5
2	Peter Fitzgerald	3	Porsche 911 RSCS	Falken Tyres	154
3	Domenic Beninca	1; 27	Porsche 911 RSCS; Ferrari F355 Challenge	Beninca Motors; Ross Palmer Motorsport	122
4	Ed Aitken	8	Porsche 911 RSCS	Ed Aitken	96
5	Geoff Morgan	12	Porsche 911 RSCS	Vodafone Network Pty Ltd	92
6	Wayne Park	27	Ferrari F355 Challenge	Ross Palmer Motorsport	91
7	Jamie Cartwright	11	Toyota Supra RZ	Car Imports Australia	32
8	Garry Waldon	29	Dodge Viper GTS	Garry Waldon	30
9	Terry Bosnjak	41	Mazda RX-7	Terry Bosnjak	27
10	Rod Salmon	38	Mitsubishi Lancer RS Evo V	Rod Salmon	26
11	Perry Spiridis	30	Maserati Ghilbi Cup	Perry Spiridis	22
=	Craig Dean	65	Ford Mustang Saleen S351	Crossover Car Conversions	22
13	John Teulan	45	Nissan Skyline GT-R	Statewide GT-R Racing	20
14	Graham Alexander	57	Mitsubishi Lancer RS Evo V	Graham Alexander	18.5
15	Murray Carter	18	Chevrolet Corvette C5	Murray Carter	16.5
16	Beric Lynton	23	BMW M3R	Bruce Lynton	16
17	Ray Lintott	9	Dodge Viper GTS	Wagon Wheels Chrysler Jeep	13
18	Paul Freestone	48	Lotus Esprit Sport 3	Freestone's Racing	8
19	Darren Palmer	27	Ferrari F355 Challenge	Darren Palmer	4
20	Damien White	38	Mitsubishi Lancer RS Evo V	Rod Salmon	3
21	Peter Boylan	7	Mitsubishi Lancer RS Evo V	Ross Almond	1
Class B - High Performance Cars
1	Geoff Full	6	Subaru Impreza WRX	Nepean EFI	166.5
2	Mark King	34	Mitsubishi Lancer RS Evo III	Mark King	163
3	Paula Elstrek	66	Mazda RX-7	Gregory Jupp	103
4	Bob Hughes	15	Mazda RX-7	Bob Hughes	83
5	Peter Boylan	7	Subaru Impreza WRX	Ross Almond	43
6	Wayne Vinckx	76	Nissan 200SX	Wayne Vinckx	40
7	Richard Davis	25	HSV GTS-R	Jayco Caravans	35
8	Scott Jacob	51	Subaru Impreza WRX	Scott Jacob	32
9	John Cowley	2	HSV VS GTS-R 215i	John T Cowley	27
10	Dwayne Bewley	40	Subaru Impreza WRX	Ben Kerrigan	22
11	Rod Wilson	66	Mazda RX-7		16
12	Clyde Lawrence	14	Subaru Impreza WRX	Clyde Lawrence	12
=	Garry Holt	99	Subaru Impreza WRX	Garry Holt	12
14	Richard Hing	81	Nissan Pulsar GTi-R		10
=	Don Pulver	96	Subaru Impreza WRX	Don Pulver	10
16	Jim McKnoulty	91	Subaru Impreza WRX	Jim McKnoulty	5
17	Gary Deane	91	Subaru Impreza WRX	James McKnoulty	4
Class C - Production Cars (Over 2500cc)
1	Peter Phelan	16	Holden VT Commodore SS	Peter Phelan	172
2	Mark Cohen	55	Holden VS Commodore SS	Mark Cohen	136.6
3	David Ratcliff	88	Toyota Camry CSi V6	Nepean EFI	133
4	Robert Chadwick	20	Mitsubishi TH Magna	Robert Chadwick	104
5	Ryan McLeod	46	Ford EL Falcon XR8	Ryan McLeod	94
6	Daryl Coon	70	Ford AU Falcon XR6	Daryl Coon	47
7	Denis Cribben	33; 46	Holden VS Commodore V8; Ford EL Falcon	Roland Hill; Ryan McLeod	39
8	Roland Hill	33	Holden VS Commodore SS	Roland Hill	33
9	Brian Carr	64	Ford AU Falcon XR8	Brian Carr	19
10	John McIlroy	95	Ford AU Falcon XR8	Benalla Auto Club	18
11	Warren Millett	68	Holden VT Commodore		3
Class D - Production Cars (1851cc - 2500cc)
1	Phil Kirkham	71	Mazda 626	Rebound Clothing Company	180
2	Melinda Price	28	Holden Vectra GL	Gibson Motorsport	118
3	Sam Newman	17	Holden Vectra GL	Gibson Motorsport	98
4	Megan Kirkham	71	Mazda 626	Rebound Clothing Company	30
5	Carol Jackson	10	Honda Civic	Pace Racing	22
Class E - Production Cars (Up to 1851cc)
1	Kosi Kalaitzidis	21	Proton M21 Coupe	Kosi Kalaitzidis	158
2	Nathan Thomas	37	Suzuki Swift GTi	Nathan Thomas	134
3	Sue Hughes	74	Suzuki Swift GTi	Formtech Competition Services	126
4	Craig Dontas	75	Suzuki Swift GTi	Buy-A-Drive	74
5	Warren Luff	36	Peugeot 306 Style	Northshore Rallysport	73.5
6	Darren Best	78	Hyundai Excel Sprint	Darren Best	65
7	Peter McKay	26	Peugeot 306	Northshore Rallysport	30
8	Paul Buda	74	Suzuki Swift GTi	VW Parts Service	13
9	David Crowe	49	Suzuki Swift GTi	David Crowe	8
Class S - Sports/Performance Cars
1	Ric Shaw	35	Toyota MR2 Bathurst	Osborne Motorsport	209
2	Wayne Russell	26	BMW 323i	Wayne Russell	148.5
3	Colin Osborne	13	Toyota MR2 Bathurst	Colin Osborne	140
4	Megan Kirkham	54	Mazda MX-5	Rebound Clothing Company	68
5	Michael Simpson	32	BMW 323i	Bruce Lynton	42
6	Clayton Haynes	4	Toyota MR2 GT	Clayton Haynes	20
7	Dean Wanless	54	Mazda MX-5	Rebound Clothing Company	16
8	Phil Kirkham	17	Mazda MX-5	Rebound Clothing Company	12
9	Matt Lehmann	54	Mazda MX-5		10
=	Nicolas Lucas	77	Toyota MR2 GT	Nicolas Lucas	10
