= Murray Carter =

Australian racing driver (born 1931)

- Nationality: Australian
- Born: 30 January 1931 (age 95) Melbourne, Victoria

Australian Touring Car Championship
- Years active: 1973–1990
- Teams: Murray Carter Racing
- Starts: 107
- Best finish: 2nd in 1975 Australian Touring Car Championship

Previous series
- 1963 1992-95 1996-99 2000-04 2007 2008-14: Australian GT Champ. Australian Production Champ. Australian GT Prod. Champ. Nations Cup; Intermarque Challenge; Victorian Sports Car Champ.

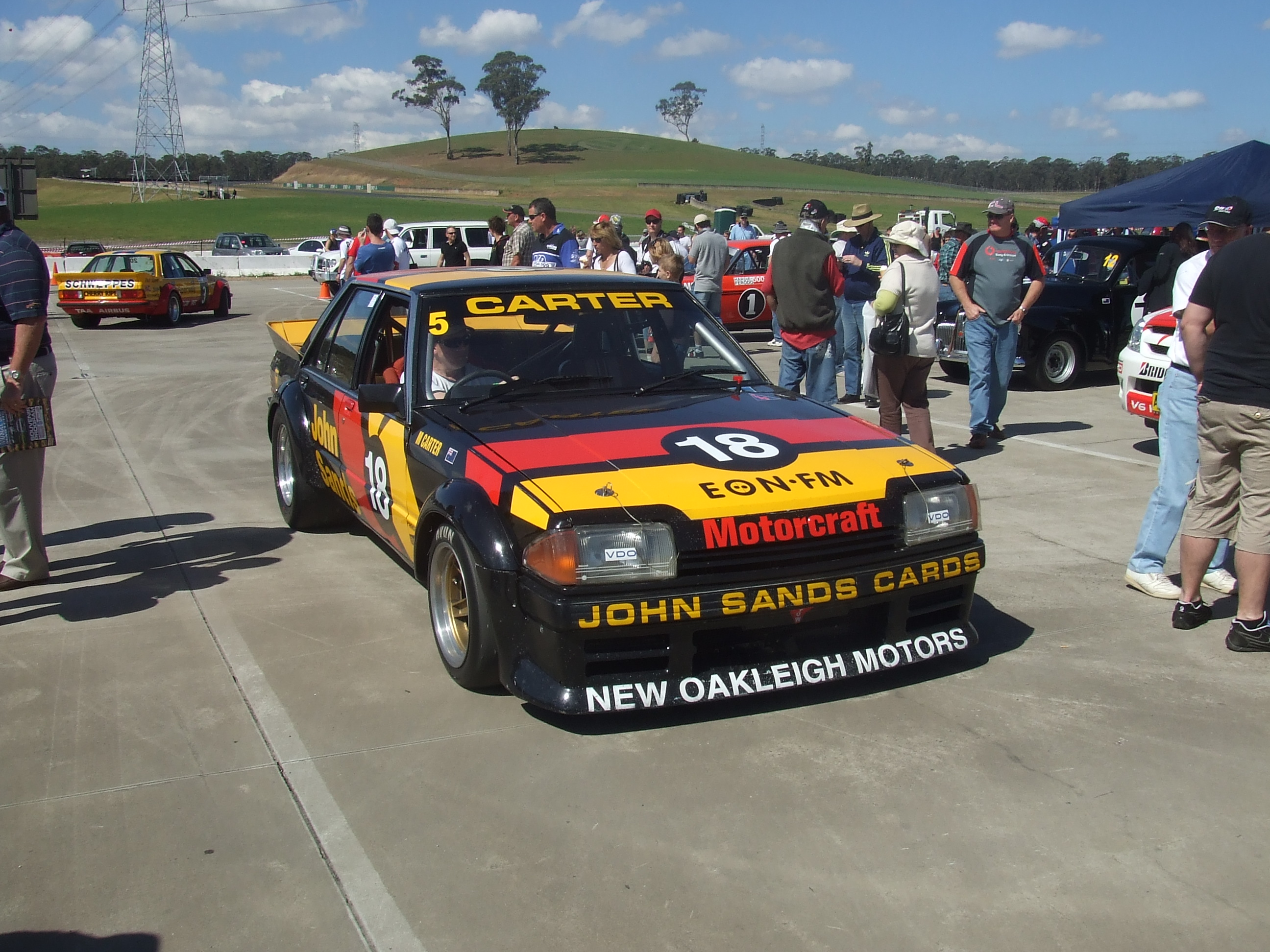
Murray Carter’s Ford Falcon XE

Murray Wishart Carter (born 30 January 1931) is an Australian racing driver. For many years a stalwart of the Australian Touring Car Championship Carter has had one of the longest racing careers of any driver in Australian history, continuing to race into his 80s.

== Racing history ==
One of a generation of racing drivers that appeared in the 1950s as tyres and fuel, rationed for most of that decade in the post-war economic climate, became more widely available. After racing motorcycles and a Jaguar XK120, Carter built an open wheeler which was powered by a Chevrolet Corvette V8 engine, the car making its first appearance in 1959. The following year the car was rebuilt as a sports car and subsequently as a "GT" car, becoming part of the brief history of Appendix K, a uniquely Australian category for closed cars with no required production origins. Carter finished runner up in the 1963 Australian GT Championship behind Bob Jane. He also embraced production car racing when it emerged in 1960 and raced at the first Armstrong 500, later to become famous as the Bathurst 1000, and won his class driving a Ford Customline.

=== Touring Cars ===
Carter emerged as a regular in the Australian Touring Car Championship in 1973. Driving Ford Falcons Carter was one of the leading privateer drivers during the 1970s and into the early 1980s. Famously Carter lent his Falcon to works driver Allan Moffat at the Adelaide International Raceway round of the 1973 Australian Touring Car Championship after Moffat's similar car was stolen from a local Ford dealer's workshop, the night before the race. Carter was a beneficiary of the work being done by Moffat and the Ford works team, getting new developments quickly, keeping him at the forefront of Ford racers through the 1970s. A career highlight came in 1975 when Carter benefitted from a season where many front running drivers and teams had fraught campaigns and finished runner up to Colin Bond in the 1975 Australian Touring Car Championship. The other major result of this period was a third placing at the 1978 Bathurst 1000 with New Zealand open-wheel ace Graeme Lawrence as co-driver.

Into 1980, Moffat and Carter were essentially left behind by Ford, as Dick Johnson became the prominent Blue Oval driver, gaining 'unofficial' works support via Ford's Motorcraft parts division. Moffat obtained the factory support of Mazda to enter their Mazda RX-7 into the Australian Group C racing category. By 1983, Carter was becoming increasingly frustrated with developing Ford's XE Falcon and achieving little reward, and switched to a cheaper-to-run Mazda RX-7. It was an ill-timed diversion, and Carter briefly stepped away from racing following the total demise of the Group C Touring Car category at the end of 1984.

In 1986, Carter returned with a Nissan Skyline DR30 RS, before returning to Ford with a Ford Sierra RS500 in 1988 with sponsorship from Netcomm Australia. During his Australian Touring Car Championship career Carter set a record for the most top three finishes without taking a win (20), a record which still stands as of 2017.

Carter's last year in touring cars was in 1990 in a privately entered Ford Sierra RS500. He raced in four of the nine ATCC rounds but did not score a point. He did provide a spectacular moment in the closing minutes of the series' return to Phillip Island for the first time since 1977 when he drove his smoking Sierra into the pits, pulling up just before entering pit lane with the engine of his car on fire. He then joined with Matt Wacker in the Sierra for what would be his last Bathurst 1000 in 1990. During practice, Wacker had a collision with Peter Brock's Sierra being driven by his co-driver Andy Rouse in The Dipper which sent the #05 car up on two wheels and into the fence. The #14 Sierra would be a DNF after 116 laps.

=== Production Cars ===
By 1991, Carter had switched to production car racing, initially with a Nissan Pintara in the Australian Production Car Championship. He later raced a Nissan Pulsar and then a Mazda 626 in this series, with a highlight of finishing runner up to Phil Morris in the 1994 Australian Production Car Championship. In 1997 Carter began racing a Nissan 200SX Turbo in the Australian GT Production Car Championship. In 1999 a Chevrolet Corvette C5 followed and Carter transitioned with it into the new Australian Nations Cup Championship in 2000. Carter raced only occasionally into the 2000s, driving his Corvette in state level racing as late as 2008. In 2011, Carter still races the Corvette occasionally at Victorian championship level as he approaches 80 years of age. In 2017 Murray relinquished his Cams racing licence, and in 2019, sold his beloved Corvette to a W.A. company.

== Career results ==
| Season | Series | Position | Car | Team |
|---|---|---|---|---|
| 1959 | Australian Drivers' Championship | 15th | Corvette Special | |
| 1963 | Australian GT Championship | 2nd | Corvette Special | |
| 1973 | Australian Touring Car Championship | 7th | Ford XY Falcon GTHO Phase III | Shell Racing |
| 1974 | Australian Touring Car Championship | 5th | Ford XB Falcon GT | Shell Racing |
| 1975 | Australian Touring Car Championship | 2nd | Ford XB Falcon GT | Shell Racing |
| 1976 | Australian Touring Car Championship | 7th | Ford XB Falcon GT | Shell Racing |
| 1977 | Australian Touring Car Championship | 14th | Ford XB Falcon GT | Brian Wood Ford |
| 1978 | Australian Touring Car Championship | 21st | Ford XC Falcon Hardtop | Brian Wood Ford |
| 1979 | Australian Touring Car Championship | 33rd | Ford XC Falcon Hardtop | Brian Wood Ford |
| 1980 | Australian Touring Car Championship | 4th | Ford XD Falcon | |
| 1981 | Australian Touring Car Championship | 5th | Ford XD Falcon | |
| 1982 | Australian Touring Car Championship | 12th | Ford XD Falcon | |
| 1983 | Australian Touring Car Championship | 10th | Ford XE Falcon | |
| 1984 | Australian Touring Car Championship | 8th | Mazda RX-7 | |
| 1986 | Australian Touring Car Championship | 15th | Nissan Skyline DR30 | |
| 1987 | Australian Touring Car Championship | 12th | Nissan Skyline DR30 | |
| 1988 | Australian Touring Car Championship | 11th | Nissan Skyline DR30 | |
| 1992 | Australian Production Car Championship | 8th | Nissan Pulsar SSS | |
| 1993 | Australian Production Car Championship | 4th | Nissan Pulsar SSS | |
| 1994 | Australian Production Car Championship | 2nd | Nissan Pulsar SSS | Murray Carter |
| 1995 | Australian Production Car Championship | 3rd | Mazda 626 | |
| 1996 | Australian GT Production Car Championship | 8th | Mazda 626 | |
| 1997 | Australian GT Production Car Championship | 18th | Nissan 200SX Turbo | |
| 1998 | Australian GT Production Car Championship | 13th | Nissan 200SX Turbo | |
| 1999 | Australian GT Production Car Championship | 17th | Chevrolet Corvette C5 | Murray Carter |
| 2003 | Australian Nations Cup Championship | 30th | Chevrolet Corvette C5 | Murray Carter |
| 2003 | Australian Nations Cup Championship: Group 2 | 18th | Chevrolet Corvette C5 | Murray Carter |
| 2004 | Australian Nations Cup Championship: Trophy Class | 15th | Chevrolet Corvette C5 | Murray Carter |

=== Complete Australian Touring Car Championship results ===
(key) (Races in bold indicate pole position) (Races in italics indicate fastest lap)

| Year | Team | Car | 1 | 2 | 3 | 4 | 5 | 6 | 7 | 8 | 9 | 10 | 11 | DC | Points |
|---|---|---|---|---|---|---|---|---|---|---|---|---|---|---|---|
| 1973 | Shell Racing | Ford XY Falcon GTHO Phase III | SYM; 5 | CAL; 4 | SAN; 3 | WAN; 4 | SUR; 7 | AIR; DNS | ORA; 7 | WAR; 5 | | | | 7th | 18 |
| 1974 | Shell Racing | Ford XB Falcon GT Hardtop | SYM | CAL; 3 | SAN; 2 | AMA; 7 | ORA | ORA; 4 | SUR; 4 | AIR; 3 | | | | 5th | 29 |
| 1975 | Shell Racing | Ford XB Falcon GT Hardtop | SYM; 2 | CAL; 4 | AMA; 3 | ORA; 3 | SUR; 4 | SAN | AIR; 2 | LAK; 3 | | | | 2nd | 44 |
| 1976 | Shell Racing | Ford XB Falcon GT Hardtop | SYM; 14 | CAL | ORA; 3 | SAN | AMA; 5 | AIR; 4 | LAK; 5 | SAN; 5 | AIR; 2 | SUR; 3 | PHI; Ret | 7th | 35 |
| 1977 | Brian Wood Ford | Ford XB Falcon GT Hardtop | SYM; 4 | CAL | ORA; 6 | AMA; 8 | SAN; 8 | AIR; 6 | LAK; 7 | SAN; Ret | AIR; 7 | SUR; 10 | PHI | 15th | 10 |
| 1978 | Brian Wood Ford | Ford XC Falcon GS500 Hardtop | SYM; Ret | ORA | AMA | SAN; 8 | WAN | CAL; 4 | LAK | AIR | | | | 21st | 4 |
| 1979 | Brian Wood Ford | Ford XC Falcon GS500 Hardtop | SYM | CAL | ORA | SAN | WAN | SUR | LAK | AIR; 6 | | | | 33rd | 1 |
| 1980 | Murray Carter | Ford XD Falcon | SYM | CAL; 3 | LAK; 2 | SAN; 3 | WAN; 5 | SUR; 3 | AIR; 6 | ORA; 5 | | | | 4th | 32 |
| 1981 | Murray Carter | Ford XD Falcon | SYM; 3 | CAL; 2 | LAK | SAN; 6 | WAN; 3 | AIR; 5 | SUR; 6 | ORA | | | | 5th | 25 |
| 1982 | Murray Carter | Ford XD Falcon | SAN; 11 | CAL; 7 | SYM | ORA; 4 | LAK; 5 | WAN; 4 | AIR; 6 | SUR | | | | 12th | 14 |
| 1983 | Murray Carter | Ford XE Falcon | CAL; 3 | SAN; 5 | SYM; Ret | WAN; Ret | AIR | SUR | ORA | LAK | | | | 10th | 35 |
| 1984 | Murray Carter | Mazda RX-7 | SAN; 19 | SYM; 10 | WAN; 7 | SUR; 6 | ORA | LAK; Ret | AIR; 8 | | | | | 8th | 49 |
| 1986 | Murray Carter | Nissan Skyline DR30 RS | AMA | SYM | SAN; 7 | AIR | WAN | SUR | CAL; 14 | LAK | WIN; 9 | ORA | | 15th | 33 |
| 1987 | Murray Carter | Nissan Skyline DR30 RS | CAL; 8 | SYM | LAK | WAN | AIR; Ret | SUR | SAN; 7 | AMA; 13 | ORA; 6 | | | 12th | 17 |
| 1988 | Netcomm Australia | Nissan Skyline DR30 RS | CAL; 7 | SYM; 8 | WIN; 5 | WAN; 9 | AIR; 9 | LAK | SAN; 10 | AMA; 12 | ORA; 25 | | | 11th | 20 |
| 1989 | Netcomm Australia | Ford Sierra RS500 | AMA; Ret | SYM | LAK; DNS | WAN | MAL | SAN | WIN | ORA; Ret | | | | NC | 0 |
| 1990 | Murray Carter | Ford Sierra RS500 | AMA; 13 | SYM | PHI; Ret | WIN; Ret | LAK | MAL | WAN | ORA; 23 | | | | NC | 0 |

=== Complete Phillip Island/Bathurst 500/1000 results ===
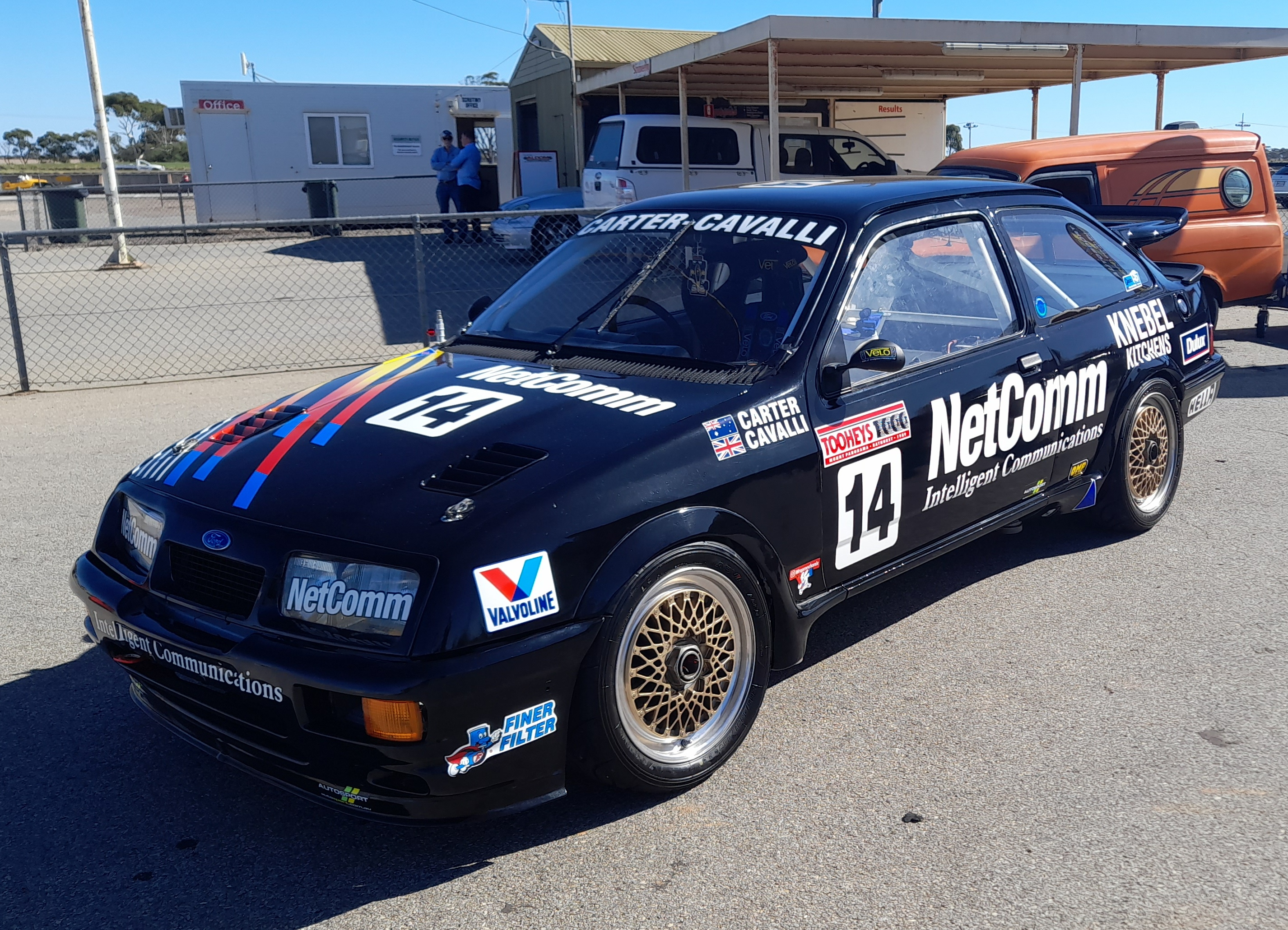
The Ford Sierra RS500 that Carter raced in the 1988, 1989 and 1990 Tooheys 1000 races. The car is pictured in 2023.

| Year | Team | Co-drivers | Car | Class | Laps | Pos. | Class pos. |
|---|---|---|---|---|---|---|---|
| 1960 | (Australia) Sabina Motors | (Australia) Ray Gibbs | Ford Customline | E | 154 | 23rd | 1st |
| 1970 | (Australia) Rollington Pty Ltd | | Ford XW Falcon GTHO Phase II | E | – | DNS | DNS |
| 1971 | (Australia) J Harding | | Ford XY Falcon GTHO Phase III | E | 127 | 11th | 6th |
| 1972 | (Australia) M Carter | | Ford XY Falcon GTHO Phase III | E | 120 | 10th | 6th |
| 1973 | Murray Carter - Shell Racing | (Australia) Lawrie Nelson | Ford XA Falcon GT Hardtop | D | 150 | 7th | 7th |
| 1974 | (Australia) Murray Carter | (Australia) Mike Stillwell | Ford XB Falcon GT Hardtop | 3001 – 6000cc | 88 | DNF | DNF |
| 1975 | (Australia) Murray Carter | (Australia) Ray Winter | Ford XB Falcon GT Hardtop | D | 53 | DNF | DNF |
| 1976 | (Australia) Murray Carter | (Australia) Ray Winter | Ford XB Falcon GT Hardtop | 3001cc - 6000cc | 148 | 19th | 8th |
| 1977 | (Australia) Brian Wood Ford | (Australia) Bob Stevens | Ford XC Falcon GS500 Hardtop | 3001cc - 6000cc | 38 | DNF | DNF |
| 1978 | (Australia) Brian Wood Ford | (New Zealand) Graeme Lawrence | Ford XC Falcon GS500 Hardtop | A | 160 | 3rd | 3rd |
| 1979 | (Australia) Brian Wood Ford | (New Zealand) Graeme Lawrence | Ford XC Falcon GS500 Hardtop | 3001cc - 6000cc | 74 | DNF | DNF |
| 1980 | (Australia) Murray Carter | (New Zealand) Graeme Lawrence | Ford XD Falcon | 3001-6000cc | 106 | DNF | DNF |
| 1981 | (Australia) Murray Carter Racing | (New Zealand) Graeme Lawrence | Ford XD Falcon | 8 Cylinder & Over | 109 | DNF | DNF |
| 1982 | (Australia) Murray Carter Racing | (Australia) Rusty French | Ford XE Falcon | A | 25 | DNF | DNF |
| 1983 | (Australia) Valentine Greetings | (Australia) David Clement | Mazda RX-7 | A | 14 | DNF | DNF |
| 1984 | (Australia) Valentine Greetings | (Australia) John Murdern | Mazda RX-7 | Group C | 0 | DNF | DNF |
| 1986 | (Australia) Everlast Battery Service | (Australia) Bill O'Brien | Nissan Skyline DR30 RS | B | 157 | 10th | 3rd |
| 1987 | (Australia) NetComm (Aust) Racing | (Australia) Steve Masterton (Australia) Denis Horley | Nissan Skyline DR30 RS | 1 | 147 | DSQ | DSQ |
| 1988 | NetComm Australia | (Australia) Steve Masterton | Ford Sierra RS500 | A | 22 | DNF | DNF |
| 1989 | Netcomm Australia | (Australia) John Mann | Ford Sierra RS500 | A | 10 | DNF | DNF |
| 1990 | Netcomm Australia | (Australia) Matt Wacker | Ford Sierra RS500 | 1 | 116 | DNF | DNF |
