= Procar =

Procar may refer to:

- ADAC Procar Series, a German-based motor racing series for Touring Cars.
- BMW M1 Procar Championship, a one-make motor racing series utilising the BMW M1 sports production car.
- Procar Australia, a defunct Australian motor racing organisation body.
- Alfa Romeo 164 Pro-Car, a 1988 concept car.
