= 1995 Australian Production Car Championship =

The 1995 Australian Production Car Championship was a CAMS sanctioned national motor racing title for drivers of Group 3E Series Production Cars.

== Calendar ==
The title was contested over a six round series with two races per round.

Rd.	Date	Circuit	City / state	Winner	Car
1	27 February	Symmons Plains	Launceston, Tasmania	Murray Carter	Mazda 626
2	12 March	Mount Panorama	Bathurst, New South Wales	Phil Kirkham	Mazda 626
3	23 April	Lakeside	Brisbane, Queensland	Harry Bargwanna	Nissan Pulsar SSS
4	21 May	Winton	Benalla, Victoria	Phil Kirkham	Mazda 626
5	9 July	Mallala	Adelaide, South Australia	Murray Carter	Mazda 626
6	6 August	Oran Park	Sydney, New South Wales	Harry Bargwanna	Nissan Pulsar SSS

Championship points were awarded on a 20-15-12-10-8-6-4-3-2-1 basis to the top ten finishers in each race. A separate Class B award was open to drivers of Group 3E cars of up to 1.6 litre engine capacity with points awarded on a 9-6-4-3-2-1 basis to the top six Class B finishers in each race.

== Results ==
Position	Driver	No.	Car	Entrant	Rd 1	Rd 2	Rd 3	Rd 4	Rd 5	Rd 6	Total
1	Harry Bargwanna	97	Nissan Pulsar SSS	Larry King Motorsports	20	22	32	30	30	40	174
2	Phil Kirkham	7	Mazda 626	Rebound Clothing Co	27	40	19	40	14	20	160
3	Murray Carter	18	Mazda 626	Murray Carter	40	27	30	-	40	7	144
4	Phil Alexander	35	Nissan Pulsar SSS	Procar Racing Pty Ltd	27	15	22	20	24	22	130
5	Kevin Burton	50	Nissan Pulsar SSS	Kevin Burton	8	9	23	22	14	14	90
6	Warren Rush		Nissan Pulsar SSS		-	-	8	14	10	30	62
7	Matt Lehmann	14	Nissan Pulsar Q	Matt Lehmann	2	-	5	16	4	16	43
8	Chris Kousparis	4	Mazda 626	Nepean EFI	-	14	6	4	10	3	37
9	Andrej Pavicevic	17	Suzuki Swift GTi	Andrej Pavicevic	2	4	10	7	7	5	35
10	Phil Morriss	1	Nissan Pulsar SSS	Peter Stevens Nissan	6	18	-	-	-	-	24
11	Jeff Edwards		Nissan Pulsar SSS		16	-	-	-	-	-	16
12	Paul Flottmann		Nissan Pulsar SSS		10	4	-	-	-	-	14
13	Kevin Ledger	42	Suzuki Swift GTi	Kevin Ledger	-	2	-	5	3	-	10
14	Colin Osborne	13	Toyota Corolla GTi	Colin Osborne	-	-	3	3	2	-	8
15	Ray Lintott	36	Nissan Pulsar SSS	Capitol Motors Nissan	-	6	-	-	-	-	6
15	Gary Quartly		Nissan Pulsar SSS		4	-	-	-	-	2	6
17	Jeff Rogers	33	Nissan Pulsar SSS	P Flottmann	-	-	-	-	4	-	4
17	Milton Leslight		Peugeot 405		-	1	3	-	-	-	4
19	Lucciano Iezzi		Toyota Corolla GTi	Colin Osborne	-	-	1	1	-	-	2
20	Chris Wiles		Ford Laser TX3		-	-	-	-	-	1	1
Class B : Up to 1.6 Litres
1	Andrej Pavicevic	17	Suzuki Swift GTi	Andrej Pavicevic	18	18	18	18	18	18	108
2	Kevin Ledger	42	Suzuki Swift GTi	Kevin Ledger	12	12	7	12	10	12	65
3	Colin Osborne	13	Toyota Corolla GTi	Colin Osborne	8	8	12	8	10	8	54
4	Lucciano Iezzi		Toyota Corolla GTi	Colin Osborne	6	6	7	6	-	-	25
5	Steve Swain	27	Toyota Corolla GTi	Colin Osborne	-	-	-	-	6	-	6
5	Garry Smith				-	-	-	-	-	6	6
7	Mark Lamour				-	-	-	-	-	4	4
