= Procar Australia =

Defunct Australian motor racing body

Procar Australia was a motorsport category management company which operated in Australia from 1994 to 2004.

Procar was founded in 1994 by Ross Palmer, a Brisbane based businessman and long time motor racing sponsor of childhood friend and multiple Australian Touring Car Champion and Bathurst 1000 winner Dick Johnson. It acted as the administrator for various championships and series for production based cars including:

- Australian Super Production Series 1994
- Australian GT Production Car Series 1995
- Australian GT Production Car Championship 1996 to 2002
- Australian Nations Cup Championship 2000 to 2004
- Australian GT Performance Car Championship 2003 to 2004
- Australian Production Car Championship 2003 to 2004
- V8 BRutes Series 2001 to 2004

The company also organised several endurances races including:

- Bathurst 3 Hour Showroom Showdown 1997 to 2001
- Bathurst 24 Hour 2002 to 2003

Procar Australia ceased operations in 2004 with Palmer citing financial issues as the reason for the company's withdrawal from the sport.

== History ==
Procar was the name of the organisational body running the Australian Production Car Championship prior to Palmer's involvement and had steered the category from the escalating costs of a series concentrating on Japanese sports cars like Toyota Supras and Mazda RX-7s into running sedans in the early 1990s, until finally transitioning to just front-wheel drive sedans in 1994 after a very poorly supported 1993 season. The front wheel drive format saw competitor numbers rebound as Mazda 626s and a large number of Nissan Pulsar teams fought along with a factory supported team of Volvo 850s. The success of the Bathurst 12 Hour which centred on cars built to the same rules, but much higher specification vehicles like the Mazda RX-7 and Porsche 968 saw a wish to create a series for these cars which became the 1994 Australian Super Production Car Series. Palmer was behind the new series and he took over the existing Procar organisation. With the creation of TOCA Australia to run a new series for Super Touring cars in 1994, Procar, along with the Australian Porsche Cup and Commodore Cup was able to provide an instant group of support categories. Brad Jones, driving a Lotus Esprit, won the Super Production Car Series.

The 1995 season saw the Australian Super Production Car Series renamed to Australian GT Production Car Series. This also saw the addition of sedan-based sub-classes to embrace the middle-specification Bathurst 12 Hour cars, resulting in a three class structure. Jim Richards in a Porsche 993 won Class A with Ford Falcon driver Chris Sexton winning class B and Peugeot 405 driver Milton Leslight winning Class C.

1996 saw the Australian Production Car Championship and the Australian GT Production Car Series merged into a single five class Australian GT Production Car Championship. The top class was split with the European and Japanese sports car which now included exotica like Ferrari F355 split from the rally style cars such as the Subaru Impreza WRX. The overlap of the bottom class of GT Production and the top class of Production cars were merged, although the Citroens and Peugeots of the old Class C did not return to race against the Pulsars and 626s. Cameron McConville won a very hard-fought championship in the top class in his Porsche against Richards and Peter Fitzgerald with the component classes being won by John Bourke (Subaru Impreza), Sexton (Ford Falcon), Chris Kousparis (Mazda 626) and Pavicevic (Suzuki Swift).

This class structure continued for four years. Over time there was an increasing emphasis on the top class as more exotic cars, like Dodge Viper, Maserati Ghibli, Lotus Elise and Chevrolet Corvette arrived along with professional drivers like Richards, John Bowe, Neil Crompton and Paul Stokell. A sixth class was introduced for small sports cars like Toyota MR2 and Mazda MX-5. An accident at the 1999 Poolrite GTP Bathurst Showroom Showdown race saw Wayne Park in a Ferrari F355 clip a back-marking Ford Falcon and was destroyed in a heavy crash. This became the impetus to separate the top class into its own series, the Australian Nations Cup Championship for the 2000 season. This would attract interest from supercar manufacturers and importers with a factory supported Lamborghini team fronted by Paul Stokell joining the group of established Porsche teams and the creation of Prancing Horse Racing, a Ferrari-based team which at its peak was running By this point the Australian Super Touring Championship was in decline and the Procar family of categories were now all-but the lead act. With the big GT Sportscars separated into their own class the GT Production Car series continued with the Mitsubishi Lancers, Subaru Imprezas, Mazda RX-7s and HSV GTS cars now the top class. Additionally 2000 saw the establishment of the V8 BRutes Series for utility mini-trucks based on the V8 versions of the Holden Ute and Ford Falcon Ute. The V8 BRute Utes were instantly popular and created a whole new genre of race fans, particularly with its aggressive panel-rubbing drivers.

By 2001 the Procar categories were now racing on the V8 Supercar support programs as Super Touring continued to collapse. The Nations Cup series continued to grow to the point in 2002 where the defunct Bathurst 12 Hour was revived as a 24-hour race, evoking similar European events the Spa and Nurburgring 24 Hours races. While popular the Bathurst 24 Hour races were hugely expensive to run. While some European and Asian teams travelled to the race, there was not enough interest to sustain the costs and just the two races were held, both dominated by Holden Monaros adapted with seven-litre Chevrolet engines specifically for this race by V8 Supercar team Garry Rogers Motorsport.

2003 saw the GT Production car championship split again as the higher performance muscle cars and Japanese turbo cars split off forming the Australian GT Performance Car Championship. The remaining teams revived the Australian Production Car Championship title and the series became much like its pre-Procar early 1990s roots with large sedans racing against smaller sports cars. With Procar now running its own meetings costs had jumped but interest had declined and Palmer folded the Procar operation in 2004.

== Legacy ==
The four categories each went their own way. GT Performance dropped the GT prefix becoming the Australian Performance Car Championship. Production Cars, now run by the Production Car Association of Australia continues to this day as the Australian Production Car Championship and is one of the leading categories of the Shannons Nationals Motor Racing Championships. The Performance Car series suffered declining numbers and ran its last series in 2007. Their competitors merged in the Production Car Championship in 2008. V8 Utes dropped the Brutes moniker continued to develop its niche strongly and is now a mainstay of the V8 Supercar support program. Nations Cup all but collapsed. A new series was created for them, without the controversial Holden Monaros, based on international GT3 regulations and reviving one of CAMS oldest titles, the Australian GT Championship. After a couple of seasons where their grid was bolstered by the Australian Porsche Drivers Challenge (known today as the Porsche GT3 Cup Challenge Australia) the GT Championship is now growing. GT's (run to FIA GT3 rules) took over the grid of the revived Bathurst 12 Hour race in 2011, reviving memories of the Bathurst 24 Hour.
