= 1994 Australian Production Car Championship =

The 1994 Australian Production Car Championship was a CAMS sanctioned motor racing title open to Group 3E Series Production Cars. It was the eighth Australian Production Car Championship and the first to be restricted to front wheel drive cars with an engine capacity of under 2.5 litres. The championship was won by South Australian Phil Morriss, driving a Nissan Pulsar SSS.

== Calendar ==
The title was contested over a six round series with two races per round.

Round	Circuit	State	Date
1	Amaroo Park	New South Wales	27 February
2	Lakeside	Queensland	24 April
3	Winton	Victoria	5 May
4	Eastern Creek	New South Wales	5 June
5	Mallala	South Australia	25 June
6	Oran Park	New South Wales	24 July

== Points system ==
Championship points were awarded on a 20-15-12-10-8-6-4-3-2-1 basis to the top ten finishers in each race.

A separate Class B award was open to drivers of Group 3E cars of up to 1.6 litre engine capacity, with points awarded on a 9-6-4-3-2-1 basis to the top six Class B finishers in each race.

== Results ==
Position	Driver	No.	Car	Entrant	Amaroo		Lakeside		Winton		Eastern Ck		Mallala		Oran Pk		Total
Position	Driver	No.	Car	Entrant	R1	R2	R1	R2	R1	R2	R1	R2	R1	R2	R1	R2	Total
1	Phil Morriss	5	Nissan Pulsar SSS		20	20	6	10	20	20	10	15	20	20	10	-	171
2	Murray Carter	18	Nissan Pulsar SSS	Murray Carter	12	15	20	-	12	12	20	20	12	15	6	12	156
3	Tony Scott	8	Volvo 850GLT	Volvo Cars Australia	2	4	15	20	2	4	12	6	15	6	1	4	91
4	Warren Rush	36	Nissan Pulsar SSS	Procar Racing	15	3	12	15	10	8	-	-	-	-	12	10	85
5	Mark Brame	42	Suzuki Swift GTi	Mark Brame	6	6	1	1	15	15	8	8	10	10	-	1	81
6	Gary Quartly		Nissan Pulsar SSS		10	8	-	-	-	-	15	12	-	-	15	20	80
7	Brian Callaghan	43	Toyota Corolla GTi	Brian Callaghan	-	-	4	3	8	6	6	4	4	4	3	6	48
8	Bevan Purcell		Nissan Pintara TRX		3	10	8	12	4	3	1	-	-	-	4	2	47
9	Harry Bargwanna	97	Nissan Pulsar SSS	Larry King Motorsport	8	12	-	-	-	-	-	-	6	12	-	3	41
10	Phil Alexander	35	Nissan Pulsar SSS	Procar Racing	-	-	2	4	-	-	-	-	-	-	20	15	41
11	Kevin Burton		Nissan Pulsar SSS		-	2	10	8	-	-	2	1	-	-	2	8	33
12	Phil Kirkham	7	Mazda 626	Rebound Sportswear	-	-	-	-	6	10	-	-	3	8	-	-	27
13	Chris Wiles		Ford Laser TX3		-	-	-	-	-	-	4	10	-	-	-	-	14
14	Milton Leslight		Peugeot 405 MI15		-	-	-	6	-	2	3	2	-	-	-	-	13
15	Ryan McLeod		Citroen BX16		4	-	-	-	-	-	-	-	-	-	8	-	12
16	Matt Lehmann	14	Nissan Pulsar SSS	Matt Lehmann	-	-	-	-	1	-	-	-	8	3	-	-	12
17	Colin Osborne	13	Toyota Corolla GTi	Colin Osborne	-	1	3	2	-	1	-	-	2	1	-	-	10
18	Lucianno Iezzi	27	Toyota Corolla	Colin Osborne	-	-	-	-	3	-	-	-	1	2	-	-	6
19	Andrej Pavicevic		Suzuki Swift		-	-	-	-	-	-	-	3	-	-	-	-	3
20	Chris Kousparis		Nissan Pulsar SSS		1	-	-	-	-	-	-	-	-	-	-	-	1
Class B : Under 1600cc
1	Mark Brame	42	Suzuki Swift GTi	Mark Brame	9	9	4	4	9	9	9	9	9	9	6	6	92
2	Brian Callaghan	43	Toyota Corolla GTi	Brian Callaghan	4	4	9	9	6	6	6	6	6	6	9	9	80
3	Colin Osborne	13	Toyota Corolla GTi	Colin Osborne	6	6	6	6	3	4	3	3	4	3	2	2	48
4	Luciano Iezzi	27	Toyota Corolla	Colin Osborne	3	2	2	2	4	-	2	2	3	4	3	4	31
5	Denis Cribben				1	1	3	3	2	3	1	1	-	-	1	1	17
6	Andrej Pavicevic		Suzuki Swift		-	-	-	-	-	-	4	4	-	-	4	3	15
7	Paul Wilkin				2	3	-	-	-	-	-	-	-	-	-	-	5
8	Gwenda Searle				-	-	-	-	1	2	-	-	-	-	-	-	3
