= 1993 Australian Production Car Championship =

The 1993 Australian Production Car Championship was an Australian motor racing competition open to Group 3E Production Cars. It was the seventh Australian Production Car Championship to be awarded by the Confederation of Australian Motor Sport.

The championship was won by Mal Rose driving a Ford EB Falcon.

== Calendar ==
The championship was contested over six rounds at three events with each round staged over a single race.

Rd.	Circuit	State	Date	Winning driver	Car
1	Winton	Victoria	16 May	Terry Bosnjak	Holden VP Commodore SS
2	Winton	Victoria	16 May	Mal Rose	Ford EB Falcon SS
3	Eastern Creek	New South Wales	6 June	Mal Rose	Ford EB Falcon SS
4	Eastern Creek	New South Wales	6 June	Mal Rose	Ford EB Falcon SS
5	Oran Park	New South Wales	8 August	Terry Bosnjak	Holden VP Commodore SS
6	Oran Park	New South Wales	8 August	Mal Rose	Ford EB Falcon SS

== Points system ==
Championship points were awarded on a 20–15–12–10–8–6–4–3–2–1 basis to the top ten finishers in each round.

== Results ==
Position	Driver	No.	Car	Winton		Eastern Ck		Oran Park		Total
				R1	R2	R3	R4	R5	R6	Points
1	Mal Rose	44	Ford EB Falcon SS	15	20	20	20	15	20	110
2	Terry Bosnjak	41	Holden VP Commodore SS	20	15	15	12	20	15	97
3	Kevin Burton	50	Ford EB Falcon SS	12	12	12	15	10	12	73
4	Murray Carter	18	Nissan Pulsar SSS	8	10	4	10	12	10	54
5	Chris Kousparis	4	Nissan Pulsar SSS	1	6	10	6	8	8	39
6	Harry Bargwanna		Toyota Corolla	4	4	6	4	4	4	26
7	Mark Brame	42	Suzuki Swift GTi	–	–	8	8	2	1	19
8	Geoff Fickling		Ford EB Falcon	10	8	–	–	–	–	18
9	Gary Quartley		Nissan Pulsar SSS	–	–	–	–	6	6	12
10	Brian Callaghan		Toyota Corolla	–	–	3	3	1	3	10
11	Colin Osborne		Toyota Corolla	6	2	–	–	–	–	8
12	Phil Morriss		Nissan Pulsar SSS	3	–	2	2	–	–	7
13	Denis Cribben	33	Ford EA Falcon S	–	3	–	1	–	2	6
14	Bevan Purcell		Nissan Pintara	–	–	–	–	3	–	3
15	Lou Renato		Hyundai Lantra	2	1	–	–	–	–	3
16	Peter McLeod	19	Citroen BX	–	–	1	–	–	–	1
