= Supercheap Auto =

Australian automotive parts and accessories chain owned by Super Retail Group

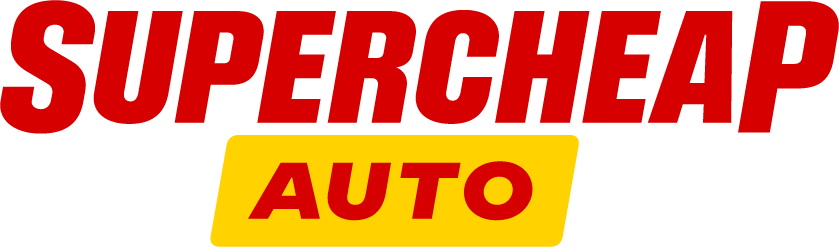
- Formerly: Super Cheap Auto
- Type: Subsidiary
- Industry: Retail
- Founded: 1972; 54 years ago
- Founder: Reg and Hazel Rowe
- Headquarters: Brisbane, Australia
- Number of locations: 341 stores (2024)
- Area served: Australia, New Zealand
- Key people: Benjamin Ward (managing director)
- Products: Automotive parts and accessories
- Owner: Super Retail Group
- Website: supercheapauto.com.au

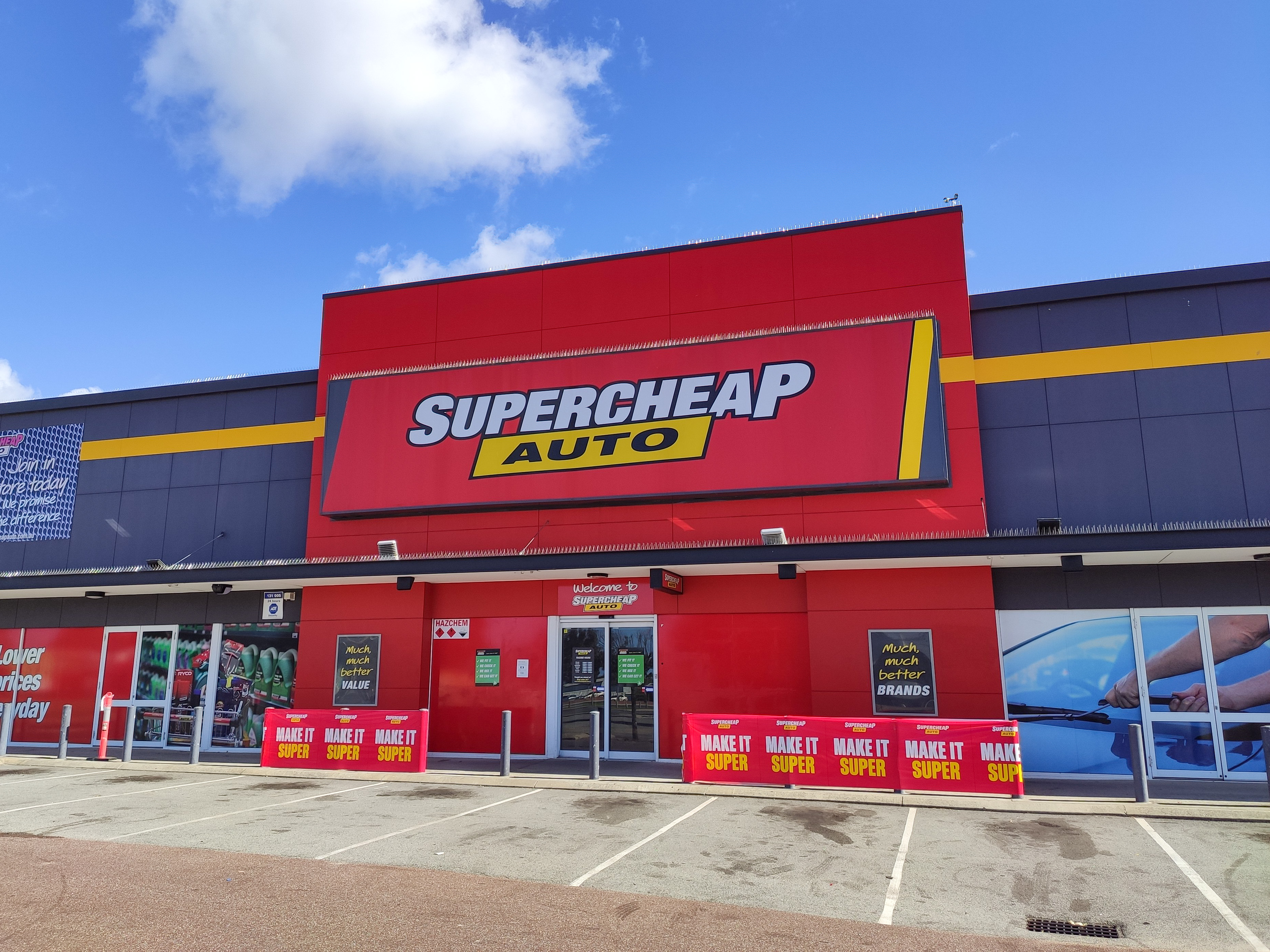
Supercheap Auto store in Cannington, Western Australia

Supercheap Auto is an Australian automotive parts and accessories retailer. It was founded in 1972, operating as a mail-order business and opened its first store in Brisbane in 1974.

It now has 341 stores across Australia and New Zealand.

== History ==
Supercheap Auto was founded by Reg and Hazel Rowe in 1972 as a mail-order business. The couple sold imported battery chargers and other automotive accessories from their home. In 1974, they opened their first store in Fortitude Valley.

== Operations ==
The company opened its 250th store in Timaru, New Zealand and the 300th in Holden Hill, South Australia.

=== Current store formats ===
==== Supercheap Auto ====
Standard format most commonly 700 m^{2} (7,500 sq ft) but smaller 400 m^{2} (4,300 sq ft) stores also exist.

==== Supercheap Auto Superstore ====
Supercheap Auto has some newer format stores including 1,000 m^{2} (11,000 sq ft) Superstores at Oxenford, Alice Springs, Cannon Hill and Caboolture.

== Sponsorships ==
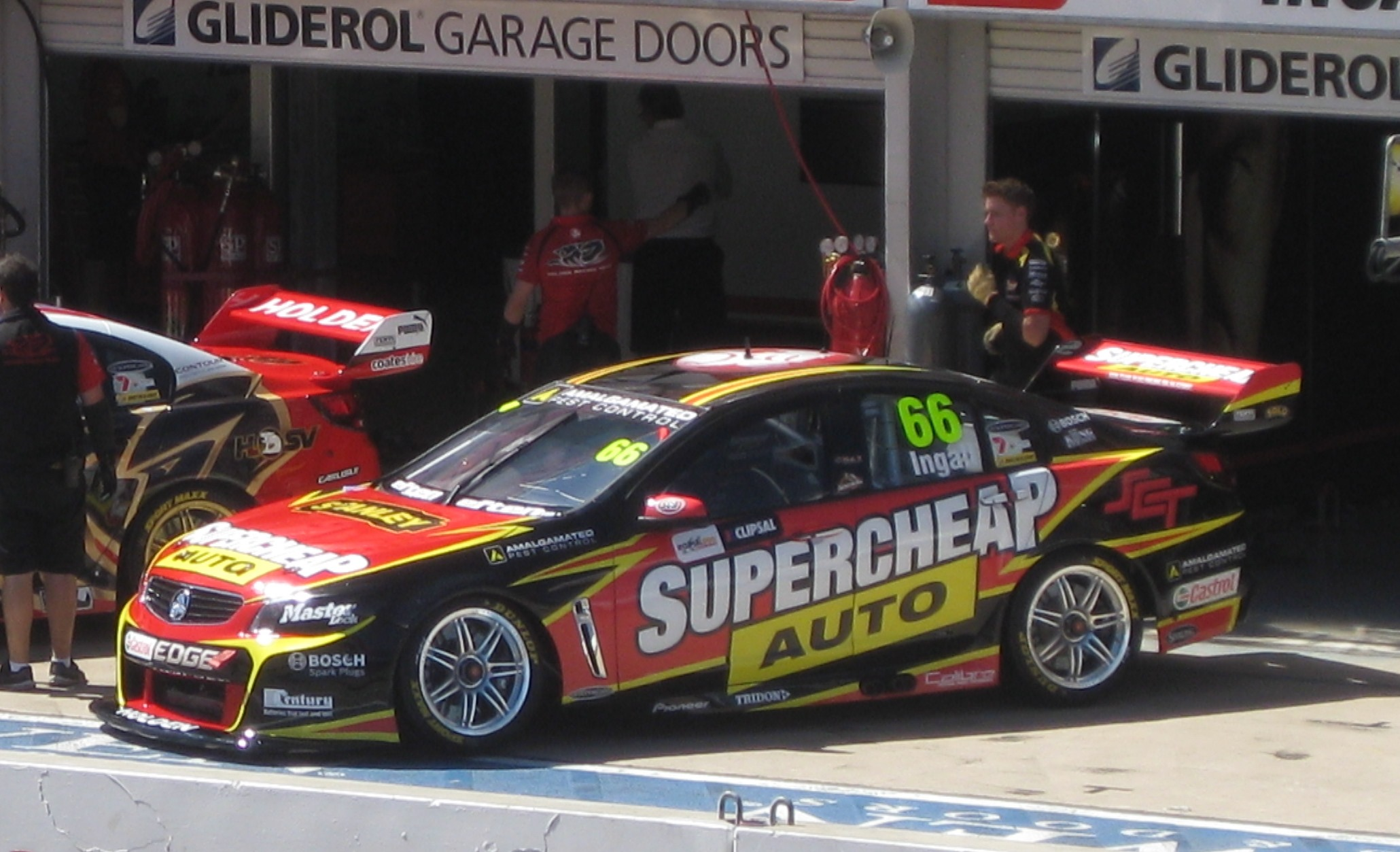
Supercheap Auto-sponsored Holden Commodore VF of Russell Ingall in 2013

From 2005 to 2020, Supercheap Auto held sponsorship naming rights for the Bathurst 1000. It has also sponsored several Supercars Championship teams since 1997 under the brand Supercheap Auto Racing, including Steven Ellery Racing (2000–2004), Paul Weel Racing (2005–2007), Paul Morris Motorsport (2008–2011), Walkinsaw Racing (2012–2015) and Tickford Racing (2016–2020).

It was naming rights sponsor of the Bathurst 1000 from 2005 until 2020, and became the naming rights sponsor of the TCR Australia Touring Car Series in 2021.

After the Supercars title and Bathurst race sponsorship went to Repco in 2021, Supercheap became an associate sponsor of Triple Eight Race Engineering as well as naming rights sponsor for entries in the 2021 to 2025 Bathurst 1000.
