= Andrej Pavicevic =

Australian race driver (born 1975)

- Born: 26 May 1975 (age 51); Sydney
- Height: 1.85 m (6 ft 1 in)

Italian Formula 3000 Championship
- Years active: 2000
- Teams: Durango

Previous series
- 1995-97 1998 1999: Australian GT Production; British Formula 3 International Formula 3000

Championship titles
- 1995 1996 1997: Australian GTP Class E Australian GTP Class E Australian GTP Class B

Andrej Pavicevic (born 26 May 1975 in Sydney, Australia) is an Australian race driver. He started racing in the NSW Street Sedan Championship in 1994 in a Suzuki Swift GTi. From there he moved to the Australian Production Car Championship in 1995 have major success winning three class championships in 1995, 1996 and 1997 and he raced a Ford Mondeo in the 1997 Bathurst 1000 race. In 1998, his major sponsor Zepter entered him in the British Formula 3 Championship even though he had next to no open wheel Formula racing experience. As expected he had a tough year in 1998, starting fourteen races and scored 19 points finishing 14th for the year and also entered the 1998 Masters of Formula 3 event at Zandvoort. He then graduated to the FIA International Formula 3000 Championship in 1999, where he completed the whole season, qualifying for only four events. In 2000, he was picked up by Durango for the Italian Formula 3000 Championship. He had a pole position in the season opener, but failed to score any points. The best finish he had was at the Non Championship race at Assen. After three years in Europe, he returned to Australia. On his return he started Drag Racing with some success. He was diagnosed with leukaemia, and after a long battle, beat the disease. He now lives in Sydney, preparing and racing Drag Cars from his Croydon Racing Developments workshop.

== Career results ==
Season	Series	Position	Car	Team
1995	Australian Production Car Championship	9th	Suzuki Swift GTi	Zepter Racing
1995	Australian Production Car Championship Class E	**1st**	Suzuki Swift GTi	Zepter Racing
1995	Australian Suzuki Swift Series	**2nd**	Suzuki Swift GTi	Zepter Racing
1996	Australian GT Production Car Championship	13th	Suzuki Swift GTi	Zepter Racing
1996	Australian GT Production Car Championship Class E	**1st**	Suzuki Swift GTi	Zepter Racing
1997	Australian GT Production Car Championship	6th	Subaru Impreza WRX	Zepter Racing
1997	Australian GT Production Car Championship Class B	**1st**	Subaru Impreza WRX	Zepter Racing
1998	British Formula 3 Championship	14th	Dallara 398 - Mugen Honda	Fortec Motorsport
1999	International Formula 3000 Championship	NC	Lola B99/50 - Zytek	Fortec Motorsport
2000	Italian Formula 3000 Championship	NC	Lola T96/50 - Zytek	Durango Benetton Junior Team

=== Complete International Formula 3000 results ===
(key) (Races in bold indicate pole position; races in italics indicate fastest lap.)

Year	Entrant	1	2	3	4	5	6	7	8	9	10	DC	Points
1999	Fortec Motorsport	IMO; DNQ	MON; DNQ	CAT; DNQ	MAG; DNQ	SIL; 21	A1R; DNQ	HOC; 13	HUN; DNQ	SPA; 15	NÜR; 13	NC	0

=== Complete Italian Formula 3000 results ===
(key) (Races in bold indicate pole position; races in italics indicate fastest lap)

Year	Entrant	1	2	3	4	5	6	7	8	DC	Points
2000	Durango Benetton Junior Team	**VLL**; **20**	MUG; Ret	IMO; 17	MNZ; Ret	VLL; 8	DON; Ret	PER; Ret	MIS	-	0

== See also ==
- List of International Formula 3000 drivers
