= Australian GT Production Car Championship =

Motor racing championship

- Category: Production car racing
- Country: Australia
- Inaugural season: 1994
- Folded: 2002
- Last Drivers' champion: Brett Peters

The Australian GT Production Car Championship was a CAMS sanctioned national motor racing title, organised by Procar Australia Pty Ltd, for drivers of Group 3E Series Production Cars.

PROCAR had first promoted a national series for production based cars in 1994. This “Australian Super Production Car Series” accommodated numerous models (including high performance GT type cars) which were not eligible for the official Australian Production Car Championship, which at the time had tightened regulations in the interests of cost-control and was limited to vehicles with an engine capacity of less than 2.5 litres. The PROCAR series was renamed the “Australian GT Production Car Series” for 1995. For 1996 the series was given full CAMS national title status to become the Australian GT Production Car Championship while the Australian Production Car Championship itself was discontinued after the 1995 title.

In 2000 the “GT “cars were moved to a new Australian Nations Cup Championship with the remaining vehicles left to contest the Australian GT Production Car Championship. 2001 saw the Australian GT Production Car Championship contested in two parts with the higher performance “GT Performance” cars and the lesser “GT Production” cars running in separate races but still competing for an overall Australian GT Production Car Championship as well as separate class awards. In 2003 the “GT Performance” class cars competed for the first time for an official Australian GT Performance Car Championship whilst the former “GT Production” class cars would contest the newly re-instituted Australian Production Car Championship.

Since then the term GT Production was revived in 2008 as a sub-class of the Australian GT Championship, where it is broadly used to describe GT cars with origins closer to production cars than Grand Tourers.

== Champions ==
=== Australian Super Production Car Series ===
Year	Winner	Car	Class	Winner	Car
1994	Brad Jones	Lotus Esprit	no classes		

=== Australian GT Production Car Series ===
Year	Winner	Car	Class	Winner	Car
1995	Jim Richards	Porsche 968CS & Porsche 911 RSCS	B	Chris Sexton	Ford Falcon XR6
1995	Jim Richards	Porsche 968CS & Porsche 911 RSCS	C	Milton Leslight	Peugeot 405

=== Australian GT Production Car Championship ===
Year	Champion	Car	Class	Champion	Car
1996	Cameron McConville	Porsche 911 RSCS	A	Cameron McConville	Porsche 911 RSCS
1996	Cameron McConville	Porsche 911 RSCS	B	John Bourke	Subaru Impreza WRX
1996	Cameron McConville	Porsche 911 RSCS	C	Chris Sexton	Ford EL Falcon XR6
1996	Cameron McConville	Porsche 911 RSCS	D	Chris Kousparis	Mazda 626
1996	Cameron McConville	Porsche 911 RSCS	E	Andrej Pavicevic	Suzuki Swift GTi
1997	Peter Fitzgerald	Porsche 911 RSCS	A	Peter Fitzgerald	Porsche 911 RSCS
1997	Peter Fitzgerald	Porsche 911 RSCS	B	Andrej Pavicevic	Subaru Impreza WRX
1997	Peter Fitzgerald	Porsche 911 RSCS	C	Chris Sexton	Ford EL Falcon XR6
1997	Peter Fitzgerald	Porsche 911 RSCS	D	Beric Lynton	BMW 323i
1997	Peter Fitzgerald	Porsche 911 RSCS	E	Trevor Haines	Ford Laser TX3
1998	Domenic Beninca	Porsche 911 RSCS	A	Domenic Beninca	Porsche 911 RSCS
1998	Domenic Beninca	Porsche 911 RSCS	B	Chris Kousparis	Subaru Impreza WRX
1998	Domenic Beninca	Porsche 911 RSCS	C	David Ratcliffe	Toyota Camry
1998	Domenic Beninca	Porsche 911 RSCS	D	Ric Shaw	Toyota MR2
1998	Domenic Beninca	Porsche 911 RSCS	E	Nigel Stones	Suzuki Swift GTi
1999	Jim Richards	Porsche 911 RSCS	A	Jim Richards	Porsche 911 RSCS
1999	Jim Richards	Porsche 911 RSCS	B	Geoff Full	Subaru Impreza WRX
1999	Jim Richards	Porsche 911 RSCS	C	Peter Phelan	Holden VT Commodore SS
1999	Jim Richards	Porsche 911 RSCS	D	Phil Kirkham	Mazda 626
1999	Jim Richards	Porsche 911 RSCS	E	Kosi Kalaitzidis	Proton M21
1999	Jim Richards	Porsche 911 RSCS	S	Ric Shaw	Toyota MR2
2000	Mark King	Mitsubishi Lancer Evo V	A	Mark King	Mitsubishi Lancer Evo V
2000	Mark King	Mitsubishi Lancer Evo V	B	David Wood	Honda Integra Type R
2000	Mark King	Mitsubishi Lancer Evo V	C	James Philip	Ford AU Falcon XR8
2000	Mark King	Mitsubishi Lancer Evo V	D	Daryl Coon	Ford AU Falcon XR6
2000	Mark King	Mitsubishi Lancer Evo V	E	Kosi Kalaitzidis	Proton M21; Proton Satria GTi
2001	Brett Peters	Subaru Impreza WRX STi	A	Brett Peters	Subaru Impreza WRX STi
2001	Brett Peters	Subaru Impreza WRX STi	B	Nathan Pilkington	Mitsubishi FTO
2001	Brett Peters	Subaru Impreza WRX STi	C	Scott Loadsman	Holden VT Commodore SS
2001	Brett Peters	Subaru Impreza WRX STi	D	Daryl Coon	Ford AU Falcon XR6
2001	Brett Peters	Subaru Impreza WRX STi	E	Luke Youlden	Holden Astra SRi
2002	Brett Peters	Subaru Impreza WRX STi	A	Brett Peters	Subaru Impreza WRX STi
2002	Brett Peters	Subaru Impreza WRX STi	B	Colin Osborne	Toyota Celica VVTL-i
2002	Brett Peters	Subaru Impreza WRX STi	C	Scott Loadsman	Holden VX Commodore SS
2002	Brett Peters	Subaru Impreza WRX STi	D	Daryl Coon	Ford AU Falcon XR6
2002	Brett Peters	Subaru Impreza WRX STi	E	Martin Doxey	Holden Astra SRi
