= Porsche 968 =

German sports car

Overview
- Manufacturer: Porsche AG
- Production: 1991–1995
- Assembly: Germany: Stuttgart
- Designer: Harm Lagaay (Porsche AG)

Body and chassis
- Class: Sports car (S)
- Body style: 2-door coupé; 2-door convertible
- Layout: Front-engine, rear-wheel-drive layout

Powertrain
- Engine: 3.0 L M44/12 16-valve I4; 3.0 L M44/60 8-valve turbo I4
- Transmission: 6-speed manual; 4-speed Tiptronic automatic

Dimensions
- Wheelbase: 2,400 mm (94.5 in)
- Length: 4,320 mm (170.1 in)
- Width: 1,735 mm (68.3 in)
- Height: 1,275 mm (50.2 in)
- Curb weight: 1,400 kg (3,100 lb)

Chronology
- Predecessor: Porsche 944
- Successor: Porsche Boxster (986)

The Porsche 968 is a sports car manufactured by German automobile manufacturer Porsche AG from 1991 until 1995. It was the final evolution of a series of water-cooled front-engine rear wheel drive models begun almost 20 years earlier with the 924. The 968 replaced the 944 from which it was derived. The 968 was Porsche's last new front-engined vehicle until the introduction of the Porsche Cayenne in 2002.

== History ==
The Porsche 944 debuted for the 1982 model year as an evolution of the 924, was updated as the "944S" in 1987, and as the "944S2" in 1989. Porsche was in a significant financial crisis at the time, with less interest in its sports cars from customers, especially in the U.S. The virtually unchanged design of the 944, which was derived from the 924, was showing its age and sales of the model declined. Thus, Porsche decided to develop a new entry-level model.

Shortly after the start of production of the S2 variant, Porsche engineers began working on another set of significant upgrades for the model, as executives were planning a final "S3" variant of the 944. This new model had a design language in line with the models already in its lineup in order to reduce development costs. During the development phase, 80 percent of the 944's mechanical components were either significantly modified or completely replaced by the engineers, leaving so little of the outgoing S2 model intact that Porsche management chose to introduce the variant as a new model, dubbing it the 968.

In addition to the numerous mechanical upgrades, the new model also received styling changes, with a more modern, streamlined look, as well as many luxury amenities not present in its predecessor, the 944. To reduce production costs, manufacturing was moved from the Audi plant in Neckarsulm (where the 924 and 944 had been manufactured under contract to Porsche), to Porsche's own factory in Zuffenhausen.

== Design ==
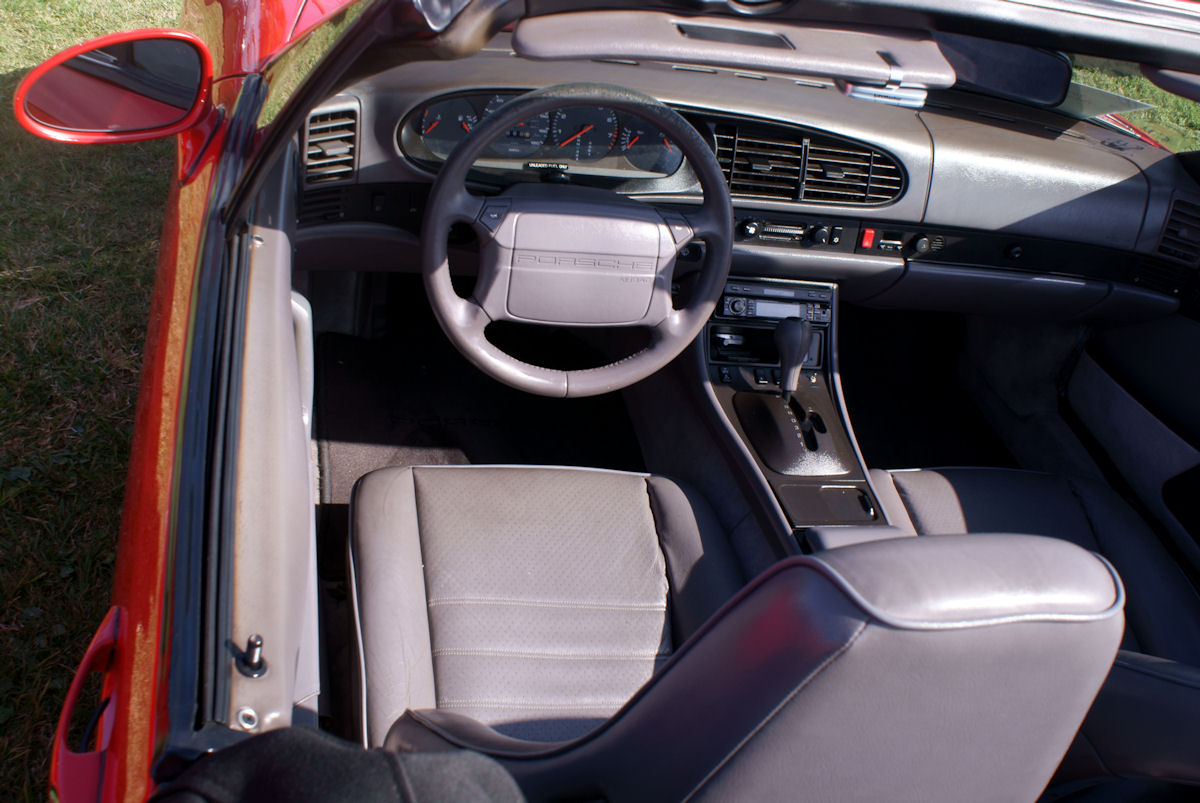
The interior of the 968 was mainly carried over from the 944 S2 with minor changes

The 968 was mainly a restyled evolution of the 944 with design links visible to its predecessor. Design work was done by Harm Lagaay who had designed the 924 and the 944 as well. The front of the car largely resembled the top-of-the line 928, sharing its exposed pop-up headlamps and the integrated front bumper. This frontal design would eventually appear on the 911 (993) two years later.

The rear of the 968 was also redesigned, featuring fully coloured rounded taillamps. Special bulbs were used in the taillamps which either illuminated a small area in amber colour when the turn signals were activated or in white when the car was reversing. PORSCHE badging was fitted between the taillights just below the model type number. The rear apron was integrated into the smoothened rear bumper.

While the exterior of the car was rounded and smoothed, the interior was largely unchanged and mostly shared with the preceding 944 S2 with the exception of switches and control knobs. The 968 also featured numerous small equipment and detail upgrades from the 944, including a Fuba roof-mounted antenna, updated single lens tail lamps, "Cup" style 16-inch alloy wheels, a wider selection of interior and exterior colours, a slightly updated "B" pillar and rear quarter window to accommodate adhesive installation to replace the older rubber gasket installation.

== Models ==
=== 968 ===
Porsche 968

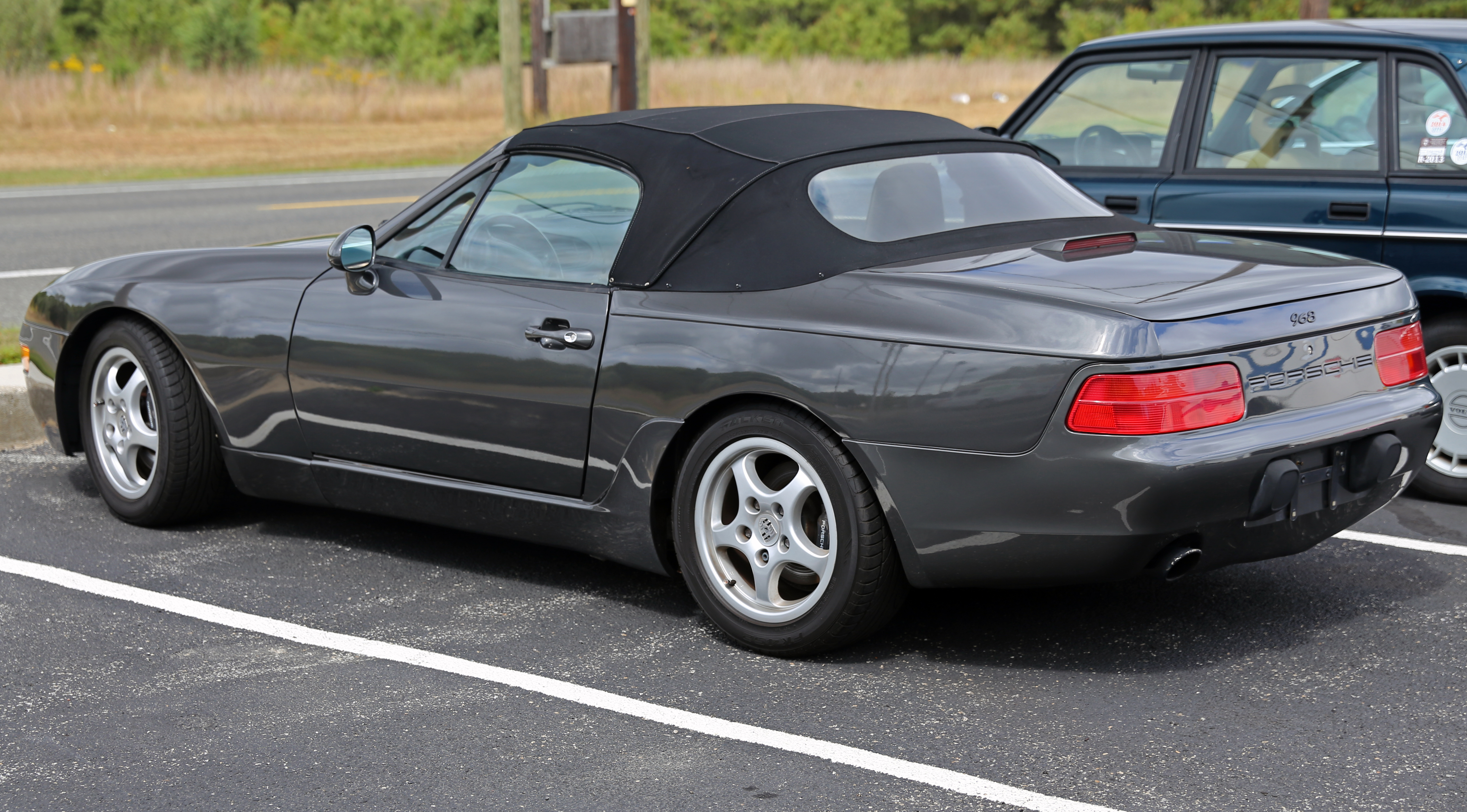
Porsche 968 cabriolet

Like its predecessor, the 968 was offered in coupé and convertible bodystyles. The 968 was powered by an updated version of the 944's straight-four engine, now displacing 3.0 L with a 104 mm bore and an 88 mm stroke and rated at 240 PS (177 kW; 237 hp) at 6,200 rpm and 305 N⋅m (225 lb⋅ft) of torque at 4,100 rpm. Modifications to the engine include a higher 11.0:1 compression ratio, lighter crankshaft, crankcase and pistons along with revised intake valves and intake manifold. Changes to the 968's powertrain also included the addition of Porsche's then-new VarioCam variable valve timing system, newly optimized induction and exhaust systems, a dual-mass flywheel, and updated engine management electronics. The 968's engine was the fourth-largest four-cylinder gasoline engine ever offered in a production car at that time. A new 6-speed manual transmission replaced the 944's old 5-speed, and Porsche's dual-mode 4-speed Tiptronic automatic became an available option. Both the VarioCam timing system and Tiptronic transmission were very recent developments for Porsche. The Tiptronic transmission had debuted for the first time only 3 years prior to the debut of the 968, on the 1989 Type 964 911. The VarioCam timing system was first introduced on the 968 and would later become a feature of the Type 993 air-cooled six-cylinder engine.

Much of the 968's chassis was carried over from the 944 S2, which in itself shared many components with the 944 Turbo (internally numbered 951) due to lack of development funds at the time. Borrowed components include the Brembo-sourced four-piston brake calipers on all four wheels with ventilated brake rotors, ABS, aluminium semi-trailing arms and aluminum front A-arms, used in a Macpherson strut arrangement. The steel unibody structure was also very similar to that of the previous models. Porsche maintained that 80% of the car was new.

The 968 can attain a top speed of 252 km/h (157 mph) when equipped with the manual transmission and has a 0–100 km/h (62 mph) acceleration time of 6.5 seconds.

For the 1993 model year, the 968 received minor changes which included a pollen filter to increase the cleanliness of the air being channeled through the air conditioner and the introduction of special packages. The seat package included heated driver and front passenger seats, the sound package included an additional amplifier in the coupé and two additional speakers installed at the rear in the convertible while the suspension package included larger 17-inch wheels and an improved braking system with cross-drilled brake discs.

=== 968 CS (Club Sport) ===
From October 1992 through 1995, Porsche offered a lighter-weight "Club Sport" version of the 968 designed for enthusiasts seeking increased track performance. Much of the 968's luxury-oriented equipment was removed or taken off the options list; less sound deadening material was used, power windows were replaced with crank-driven units, upgraded stereo systems, A/C and sunroof were still optional as on the standard coupé and Convertible models. In addition, Porsche installed manually adjustable lightweight Recaro racing seats rather than the standard power-operated leather buckets (also manufactured by Recaro), a revised suspension system optimised and lowered by 20 mm for possible track use, 17-inch wheels (also slightly wider to accommodate wider tyres) rather than the 16-inch as found on the coupé and wider tyres, 225 front and 255 rear rather than 205 and 225 respectively. The four-spoke airbag steering wheel was replaced with a thicker-rimmed three-spoke sports steering wheel with no airbag, heated washer jets were replaced with non heated, vanity covers in the engine bay were deleted, as was the rear wiper. The Club Sport has no rear seats, unlike the 2+2 Coupé.

Model year 1993 Club Sport models were only available in Grand Prix White, black, Speed yellow, Guards red or Maritime blue exterior colours. Seat backs were colour-coded to the body. "Club Sport" decals were applied to UK market cars in either black, red or white but there was a 'delete' option.

For model year 1994, Riviera blue replaced Maritime Blue and a number of other colours and option packs were available including the option to add comfort rear seats with an electric boot release.

All Club Sports had black interiors with simpler door cards similar to the 944. Due to the reduction in the number of electrical items the wiring loom was reduced in complexity which saved weight and also the battery was replaced with a smaller one, again reducing weight. With the no frills approach meaning less weight, as well as the optimising of the suspension, Porsche could focus media attention on the Club Sport variants fast road and track abilities. This helped to slightly bolster the flagging sales figures in the mid-1990s. The Club Sport variant achieved a 'Performance Car Of The Year' award in 1993 from Performance Car magazine in the UK. Club Sport models were only officially available in the UK, Europe, Japan & Australia, although "grey market" cars found their way elsewhere. The declared weight of the 968 CS is 1,320 kg (2,910 lb), ~100 kg (220 lb) lighter than the regular 968. Acceleration from a standstill to 97 km/h (60 mph) takes 5.6 seconds and top speed is 260 km/h (162 mph).

Out of a total of 1538 cars produced by Porsche, 1232 were registered as 968 CS. The remaining 306 cars were registered as "968 Sport" (see below).

A UK-only version called "968 Sport", was offered in 1994 and 1995, and was essentially a Club Sport model (it uses CS chassis numbers) with various model year 1994 option packs to create the P35 "CS UK Luxury Pack". This added an alarm, power windows / mirrors, electric release boot, central locking, sunroof and cloth comfort front and rear seats (the same front seats were a non cost option on the CS). With the added electrics the larger wiring loom was used. At £32,995, the 968 Sport was priced £4,500 lower than the standard 968, but had most of the latter's desirable "luxuries" and consequently outsold it by a large margin (306 of the 968 Sport models compared to 40 standard 968 coupés).

Porsche 968 Club Sport

Rear view

=== 968 Turbo S ===
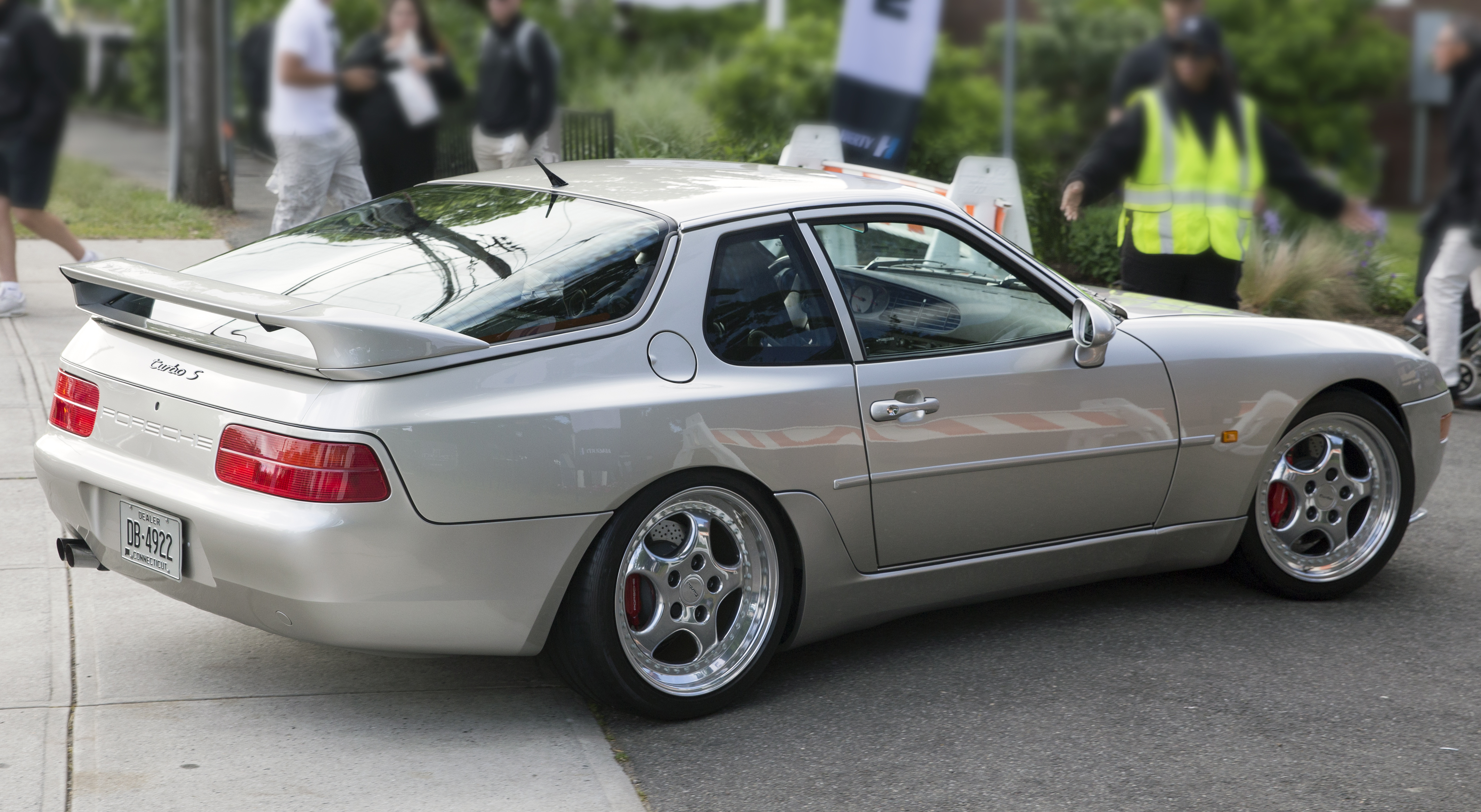
1993 Porsche 968 Turbo S

In 1993, Porsche Motorsports at Weissach briefly produced a turbocharged 968 Turbo S, an unexpected naming choice for Porsche which usually reserves the added "S" moniker for models that have been tuned for more power over a "lesser" counterpart, such as with the 911 Turbo. The 968 Turbo S shared the same body and interior as the Club Sport and visually can be identified by the NACA bonnet hood scoops, adjustable rear wing, three-piece Speedline wheels and deeper front spoiler. The car had the suspension lowered by 17.8 mm (0.7 in) and was 70 kg (154 lb) lighter than the standard 968. The 968 Turbo S was powered by a 3.0 L engine with an 8-valve SOHC cylinder head (from the 944 Turbo S) and 944S2 style engine block. As per the factory, the car's 0–100 km/h (62 mph) time was 5.0 seconds and the top speed 280 km/h (174 mph). The engine generated 305 PS (224 kW; 301 hp) at 5,600 rpm with a maximum torque of 500 N⋅m (369 lb⋅ft) at 3,000 rpm. Only 14 were produced in total, and only for sale in mainland Europe.

== Motorsport ==
=== 968 Turbo RS ===
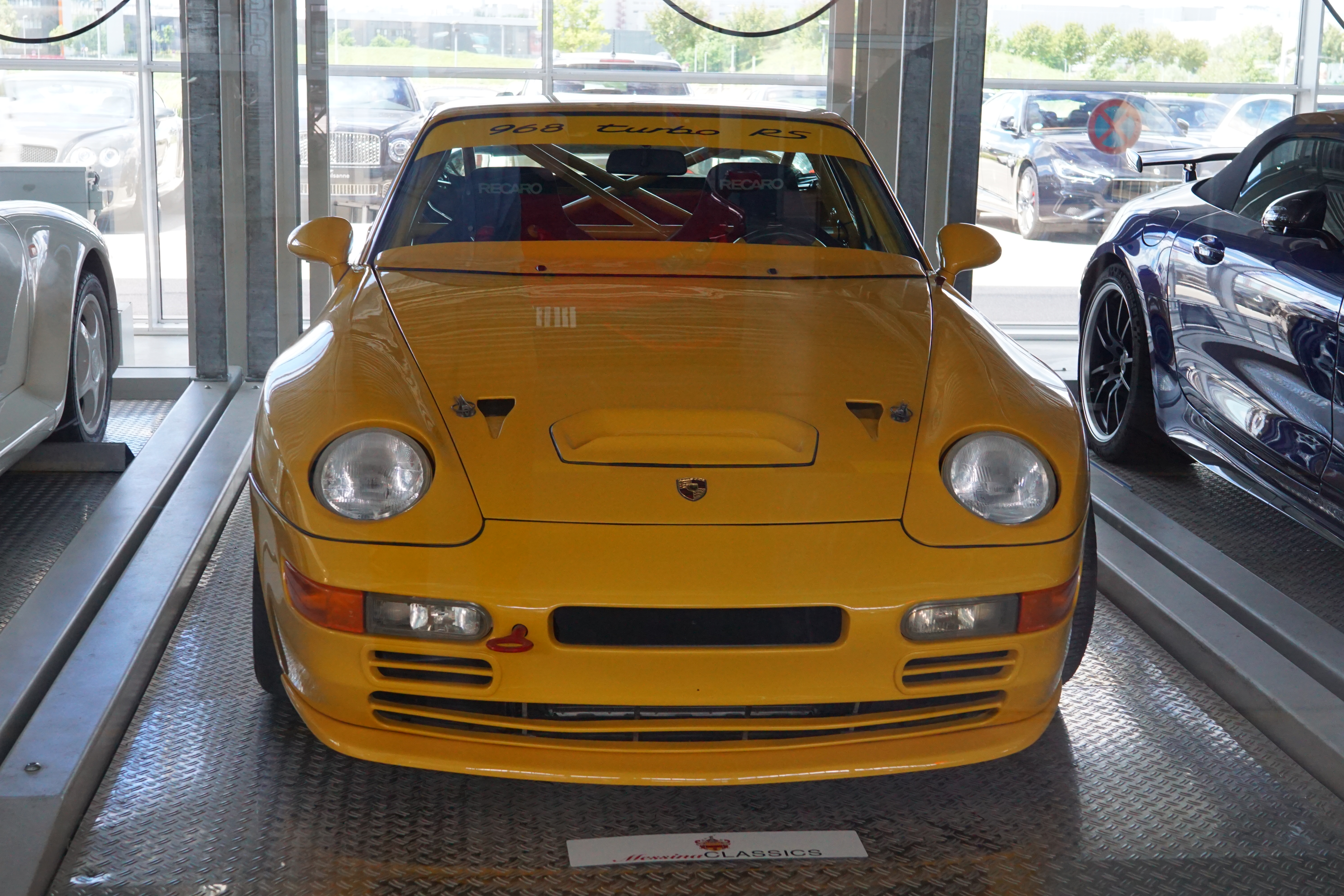
Porsche 968 Turbo RS.

Between 1992 and 1994, Porsche Motorsports Research and Development built and provided a full "Race" version (stripped out 968 Turbo S) for Porsche's customer race teams. The 968 Turbo RS was available in two variations; a 342 PS (252 kW; 337 hp) version using the K27 turbocharger from the Turbo S, which was built to the German ADAC GT specification (ballast added to bring the car up to the 1,350 kg minimum weight limit), and an international spec version which used a KKK L41 turbocharger with the engine rated at 355 PS (261 kW; 350 hp) and a reduced weight of 1,212 kg (2672 lbs). The interior of the Turbo RS features a single racing bucket seat with six point harness along with a welded in roll cage required for it to be eligible. Other modifications included a modified 6-speed manual transmission having altered gear ratios and a racing clutch along with racing suspension. Only 4 were ever produced as privateer racing teams found the contemporary 911 Carrera RS 3.8 race car to be of more interest. These are the rarest 968s ever produced.

In the ADAC GT Cup, the Joest team achieved fourth place in the Avus race in 1993 with the Turbo RS driven by Manuel Reuter. In the BPR, the car was driven at the 4-hour race by Dijon in 1994 to sixth place which was its best result in the race series. The Seikel Motorsport team used a 968 Turbo RS at the 1994 24 Hours of Le Mans, driven by John Nielsen, Thomas Bscher and Lindsay Owen-Jones. After 84 laps, the team had to end the race prematurely after an accident.

== Production figures for all 968 variants ==
Production
Model year	Production			Notes
Model year	Total	Non US/Canada	US/Canada	Notes
1992	5,353	*3,913	1,440	* 1 Red Turbo RS
1993	3,783	*2,701	1,082	* 1 Yellow & 1 Blue Turbo RS, 14 Turbo S
1994	2,484	*965	1,519	* 1 Black Turbo RS
1995	1,156	532	624	
Total	12,776	8,111	4,665	Of these, 4,389 were convertibles, of which 2,248 were exported to the US

The 968 was Porsche's last front-engine vehicle of any type to enter production before the introduction of the Porsche Cayenne in 2003. Its discontinuation in 1995 due to poor sales coincided with that of the 928, Porsche's only other front-engine car at the time. The 968 was also the last Porsche sold with a four-cylinder engine prior to the introduction of the Porsche Macan in 2014.
