= Group 3E Series Production Cars =

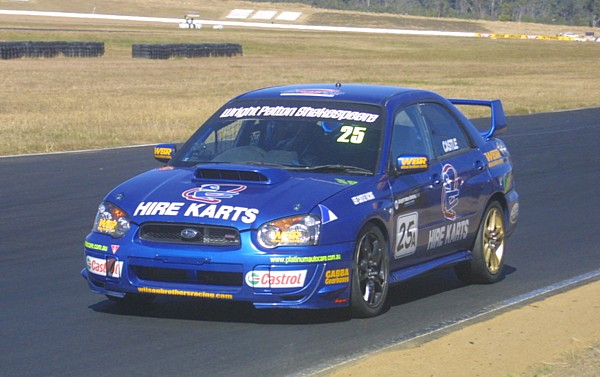
- Lee Castle contested the 2008 Australian Production Car Championship in a Group 3E Subaru Impreza WRX)
- Category: Production Car Racing
- Country: Australia
- Inaugural season: 1995
- Tyre suppliers: [Multiple]

Group 3E Series Production Cars is an Australian motor racing formula for production based cars competing with limited modifications. Group 3E cars formerly contested the Australian Manufacturers' Championship and Australian Production Car Championship titles and compete in the annual Bathurst 12 Hour and Bathurst 6 Hour endurance races.

== History ==
Regulations for production car racing in Australia were first formalised in 1964 when the Confederation of Australian Motor Sport introduced the Group E Series Production Touring Cars category. This was abandoned at the end of 1972.

“Series Production” made a return to Australian motor racing in 1981 when a new set of Group E regulations was issues by CAMS. The new Series Production Cars were, like their predecessors, intended to be mass-produced vehicles made suitable for competition by minimal modifications. Eligible cars were limited to those with an engine capacity of less than 4500cc and only vehicles which CAMS specifically chose to include on a model eligibility list could compete. Classified drivers were banned and the category was intended to be a second level category with no championship, run only at restricted race meetings.

For 1984 CAMS announced a revision of the rules, with a wider range of models now eligible to race in Group E and freely available optional equipment (such as limited slip differentials) now permitted. The advent of the Bob Jane Super Series in 1984 saw the class take a major step forward. With prizemoney totalling $200,000 the Super Series was richest motor racing series in Australia at that time. Special dispensation was granted to enable classified drivers to compete and cars fitted with turbocharged engines were now permitted. 1987 saw the running of the inaugural Australian Production Car Championship, open to drivers of Group E Series Production cars and contested over two races at a single race meeting at Winton Raceway in Victoria.

In 1988 Group E was officially redesignated as Group 3E Series Production Cars. and in the same year the Australian Production Car Championship was expanded to a series format and attracted sponsorship from the Yokohama tyre company. For 1990 turbocharged cars were banned and Group 3E became a class for family orientated naturally aspirated sedans. 1994 saw CAMS limit the class to front wheel drive cars of under 2.5 litre engine capacity. The 2.5 litre cars would only contest one more Australian Production Car Championship as that title was replaced by the Australian GT Production Car Championship in 1996. The new title, which was contested under revised Group 3E regulations, permitted a much larger variety of models to compete including GT type cars such as Porsche, Ferrari and Lotus.

The year 2000 saw the Australian GT Production Car Championship split into the Australian Nations Cup Championship (for GT type cars) and the Australian GT Production Car Championship (for other production based vehicles) with Group 3E regulations covering cars competing in both titles. The Australian Nations Cup Championship was moved away from Group 3E regulations for 2003 with a greater level of modifications permitted to the cars. The same applied to certain high performance models from the Australian GT Production Car Championship which would now contest the Australian GT Performance Car Championship. From this time Group 3E regulations applied only to the remaining cars which would contest the annual Australian Production Car Championship resurrecting the title which was last awarded in 1995.

The Bathurst 12 Hour endurance race was revived in 2007 as an annual event open to Group 3E cars. For 2008 the Australian Manufacturers' Championship title was reinstituted and contested concurrently with Australian Production Car Championship. This would mark the first time since 1972 that the Australian Manufacturers title had been open to Series Production vehicles. From 2011 onwards, the Bathurst 12 Hour became open to GT3 cars and the production element of the race decreased. To provide a new showpiece event for production racing at the circuit, in 2016 the Bathurst 6 Hour was launched for series production.
