= Australian Production Car Championship =

Australian motor racing competition

- Category: Production Car Racing
- Country: Australia
- Inaugural season: 1987
- Drivers' champion: Iain Sherrin
- Official website: Australian Production Car Series

The Australian Production Car Championship is an Australian motor racing title for production cars. The championship was first contested in 1987 and from 2008 to 2015 the title was awarded to the most successful driver in the annual Australian Manufacturers' Championship series which ran on the Shannons Nationals Motor Racing Championships program.

For 2016 the Australian Manufacturers' Championship (and thus the Australian Production Car Championship) was rebranded again as the Australian Production Car Series.

In 2025, the series, which had since its inception been sanctioned by Motorsport Australia and its predecessors organisation CAMS, switched to the Australian Auto Sport Alliance and will run as part of the Hi-Tec Oils Super Series event calendar.

== History ==
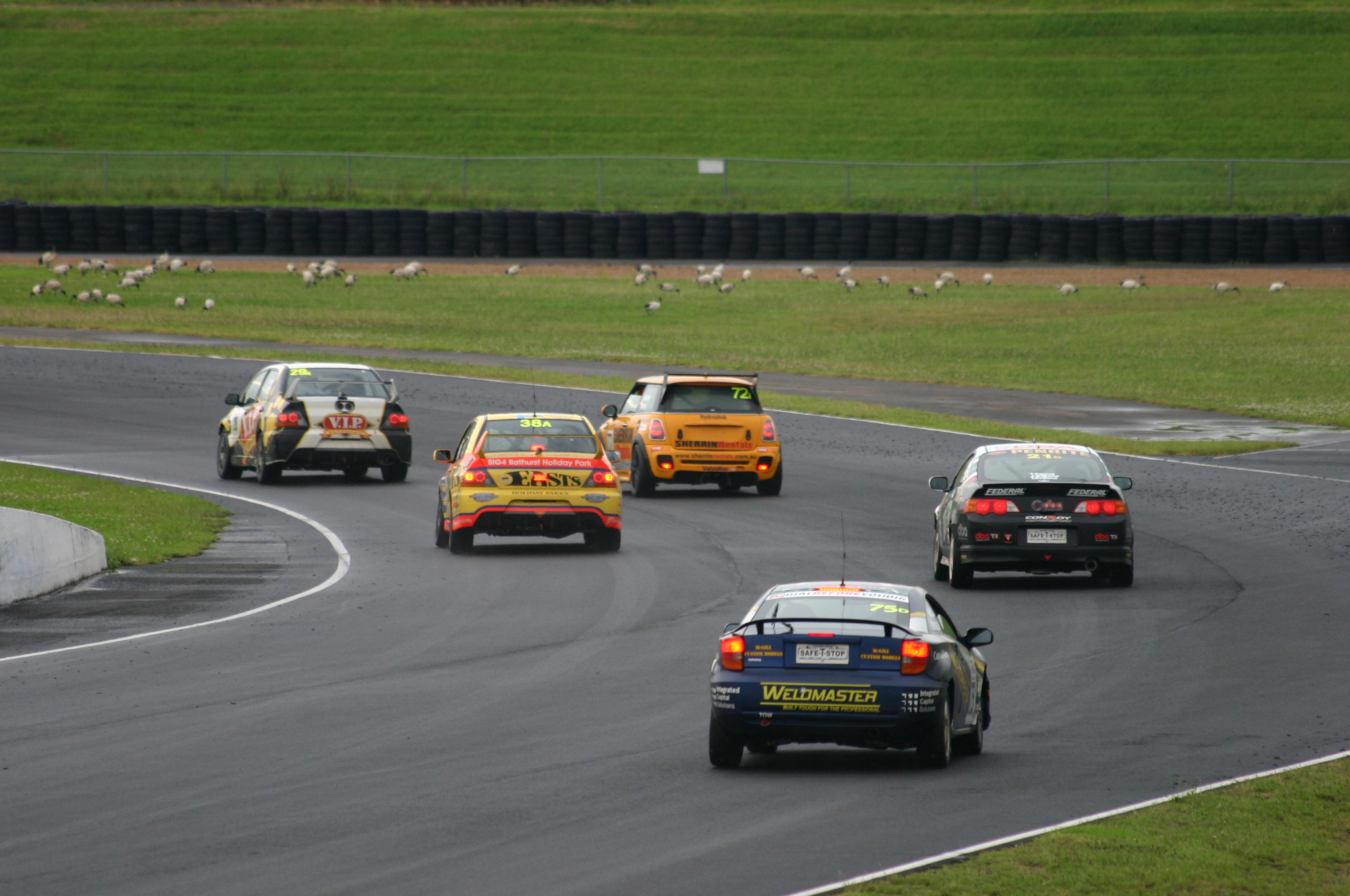
Australian Production Car Championship cars competing in a 6-hour race at Sydney Motorsport Park in 2011.

The title was first contested in 1987, with the inaugural champion determined from the results of two races held at the Winton Motor Raceway in Victoria on 27 September. The APCC was expanded to a series format in 1988. Changes to the Group 3E regulations in 1990 saw various cars including turbocharged and V8 powered models deemed ineligible for the championship from that year. In 1994 and 1995, competitors were restricted to using only front wheel drive cars of less than 2.5 litre capacity. The introduction in 1996 of the Australian GT Production Car Championship (which permitted GT type cars such as Porsche 911 and Ferrari F355) saw the APCC discontinued from that year.

Following the transfer of the GT cars to the new Australian Nations Cup Championship in 2000 and the relocation of other high performance models into a new Australian GT Performance Car Championship in 2003, the Australian GT Production Car Championship reverted to the Australian Production Car Championship name for the 2003 season.

For 2008, the cars from the Australian Performance Car Championship joined those from the Australian Production Car Championship to contest the Australian Manufacturers' Championship. with the Australian Production Car Championship title awarded to the highest scoring driver over the same series of races. This continued through to 2015.

For 2016 the Australian Manufacturers' Championship (and thus the Australian Production Car Championship) was replaced by the Australian Production Car Series.

In 2025, the series switched its sanctioning to the Australian Auto Sport Alliance, to run at the Hi-Tec Oils Super Series. According to the category organiser, the switch was due to reduced entry fees, better television coverage and more certainty of track time at events.

== Results ==
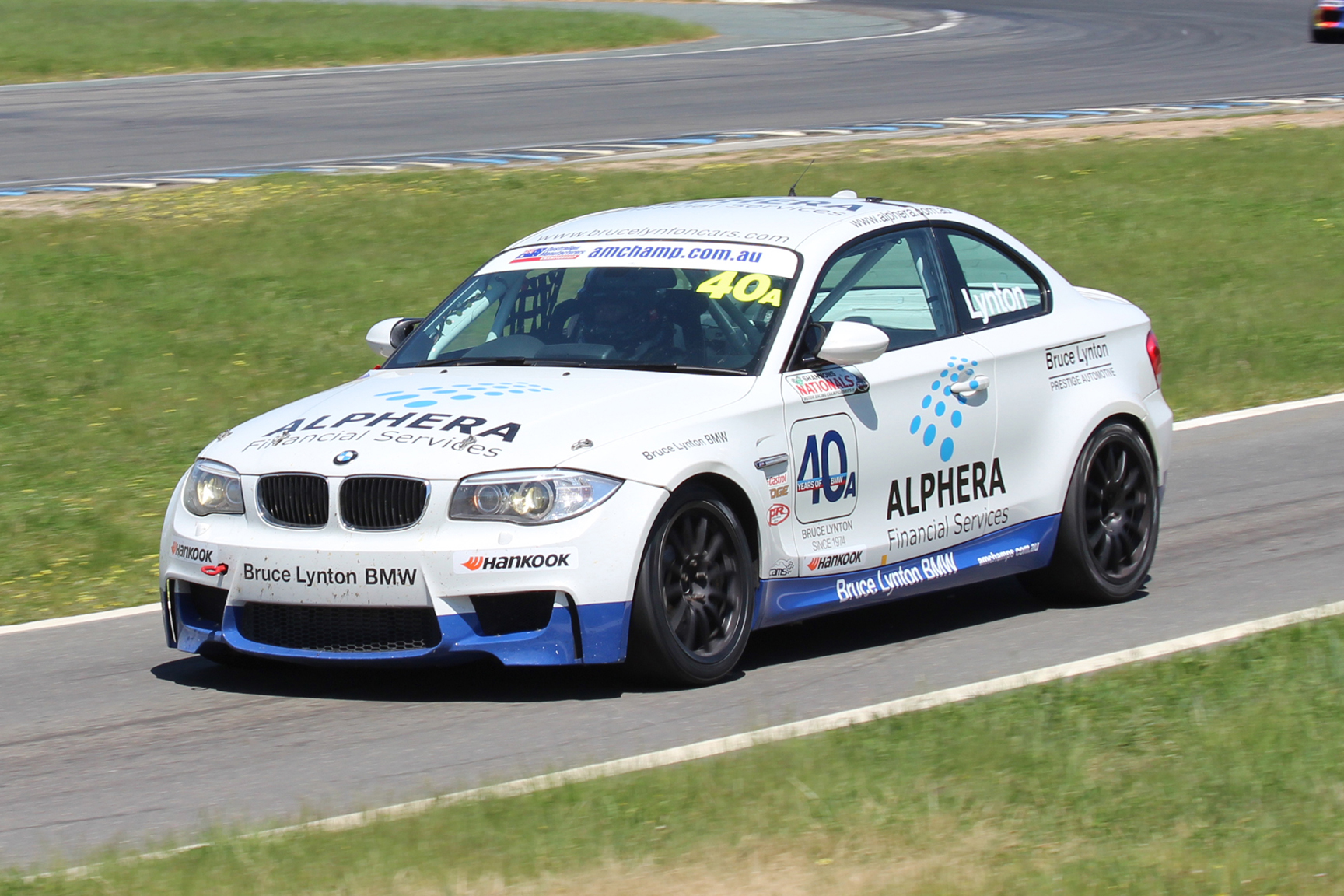
Beric Lynton won the 2014 Australian Production Car Championship driving BMW 1M

=== Australian Production Car Championship ===
Year	Champion	Vehicle
1987	Peter Fitzgerald	Mitsubishi Starion Turbo
1988	Garry Waldon	Mazda RX-7 Turbo
1989	Peter Fitzgerald	Toyota Supra Turbo
1990	Kent Youlden	Ford Falcon (EA)
1991	Kent Youlden	Ford Falcon (EA)
1992	Terry Lewis	Holden VP Commodore SS
1993	Mal Rose	Ford EB Falcon SS
1994	Phil Morriss	Nissan Pulsar SSS
1995	Harry Bargwanna	Nissan Pulsar SSS
1996–2002	absorbed into Australian GT Production Car Championship	
2003	Scott Loadsman	Holden VX Commodore SS
2004	Chris Alajajian	Subaru Liberty GT
2005	Colin Osborne	Toyota Celica
2006	David Ryan	Ford BF Falcon XR6 Turbo
2007	Garry Holt	BMW 335i
2008	Colin Osborne	Toyota Celica
2009	Garry Holt	BMW 335i
2010	Stuart Kostera	Mitsubishi Lancer RS-Evolution X
2011	Stuart Kostera	Mitsubishi Lancer RS-Evolution X
2012	Stuart Kostera	Mitsubishi Lancer RS-Evolution X
2013	Garry Holt	Mitsubishi Lancer RS-Evolution X
2014	Beric Lynton	BMW 1M
2015	Grant Sherrin	BMW 135i

=== Australian Production Car Series ===
Year	Winner	Vehicle
2016	Beric Lynton	BMW 1M
2017	Grant Sherrin; Iain Sherrin	BMW M4
2018	Jim Pollicina; Ryan Simpson	Lotus Exige 350 Sport
2019	Iain Sherrin	BMW M4
2020-2021	Cancelled due to COVID-19	
2022	Drew Russell; Wayne Russell	BMW M3
2023	Iain Sherrin	BMW M4
2024	Dean Campbell; Cameron Crick	BMW M2
2025	Trent Whyte	Ford Mustang Mach 1
