= 2025 Australian Production Car Series =

Motor racing competition

The 2025 Australian Production Car Series was a motor racing series for Group 3E Series Production Cars, which were very lightly modified versions of production road cars. The series dates to 1987.

Since its inception, the series had been sanctioned by the FIA-affiliated Motorsport Australia; In 2025 the series was now sanctioned by the alternative Australian Auto Sport Alliance and ran at the Hi-Tec Oils Super Series race events. According to the category promoter, the change offered reduced entry fees, increased television exposure and more assurances of track time for competitors.

The 2025 Bathurst 6 Hour, an endurance race run under the same technical regulations, was the other major competition for this class of car in Australia. It remained a one-off event sanctioned by Motorsport Australia.

== Live coverage ==
As part of the Super Series, the events were streamed on YouTube, the Australian pay TV service Foxtel and its associated streaming service Kayo, and broadcast on the free to air SBS and its associated streaming service SBS On Demand.

== Calendar ==
Round	Event	Circuit	Dates	Map
1	Hi-Tec Oils Super Series Round 2	(New South Wales) Sydney Motorsport Park	30 May–1 June	2025 Australian Production Car Series is located in Australia
2	2 Days of Thunder	Queensland Raceway	27–29 June	2025 Australian Production Car Series is located in Australia
3	Sherrin Rentals QR Fight In The Night	Queensland Raceway	15–17 August	2025 Australian Production Car Series is located in Australia
4	Hi-Tec Oils Super Series Round 6	(Victoria (state)) Winton Motor Raceway	31 October–2 November	2025 Australian Production Car Series is located in Australia
