= 1989 Australian Production Car Championship =

The 1989 Australian Production Car Championship was a CAMS sanctioned national motor racing title for drivers of Production Cars complying with Group 3E regulations. These regulations were formulated by CAMS to facilitate the racing in Australia of mass-produced motor vehicles with minimal modifications. The championship was contested over an eight round series with one race per round.

- Round 1, Symmons Plains, Tasmania, 12 March
- Round 2, Lakeside, Queensland, 16 April
- Round 3, Mallala, South Australia, 30 April
- Round 4, Sandown, Victoria, 21 May
- Round 5, Winton, Victoria, 4 June
- Round 6, Oran Park, New South Wales, 9 July
- Round 7, Amaroo Park, New South Wales, 6 August
- Round 8, Oran Park, New South Wales, 20 August

Championship points were awarded on a 20-15-12-10-8-6-4-3-2-1 basis to the first ten finishers in each round. Only the best seven round results were retained in determining each driver's points total.

== Results ==
Position	Driver	No.	Car	Entrant	Rd 1	Rd 2 (Note: Only half points were awarded at Round 2 due to the race distance being less than the prescribed minimum.)	Rd 3	Rd 4	Rd 5	Rd 6	Rd 7	Rd 8	Total
1	Peter Fitzgerald	3	Toyota Supra Turbo	Yokohama Tyres Australia Pty Ltd	15	-	20	15	15	20	20	15	120
2	Ken Douglas	10	Toyota Supra Turbo	Douglas-Robinson Motorsport	12	(6)	15	20	10	12	15	20	104
3	Mark Gibbs	8	Toyota Supra Turbo	Michael Preston Racing	20	(10)	12	12	20	10	12	12	98
4	John Bourke	2	Toyota Supra Turbo	John Bourke Racing	8	7.5	6	10	12	15	-	8	66.5
5	Michael Preston	6	Toyota Supra Turbo	Michael Preston Racing	10	-	-	-	4	8	10	10	42
6	Ian Palmer	7	Holden VL Commodore Turbo	Palmer Promotions	-	5	10	-	-	3	3	4	25
7	Andrew Newton	35	Honda CRX	Andrew Newton	-	2	1	1	3	2	4	6	19
8	Kent Youlden	58	Ford Falcon EA S	Kent Youlden	-	-	2	4	6	-	2	2	16
9	Richard Whyte		Holden VL Commodore Turbo	Richard Whyte	-	-	-	6	8	-	-	-	14
10	Andrew Harris		Mazda RX-7 Turbo	Andrew Harris Constructions	-	-	-	-	-	6	6	-	12
11	Kevin Waldock	41	Holden VL Commodore Turbo	Blast Dynamics	2	1.5	8	-	-	-	-	-	11.5
12	Allen Fender	16	Holden VL Commodore Turbo	Allen Fender	-	-	4	-	-	4	-	-	8
12	John Suttor		Holden VL Commodore Turbo	John Suttor	-	-	-	8	-	-	-	-	8
12	Roland Hill		Holden Commodore	Roland Hill	-	-	-	-	-	-	8	-	8
15	Gary Waldon	1	Mazda RX-7 Turbo	Gary Waldon	6	-	-	-	-	-	-	-	6
15	Paul Fordham		Holden VL Commodore Turbo; Holden VN Commodore SS	SAAS Steering Wheels	4	-	-	2	-	-	-	-	6
15	Max Bonney	86	Holden VL Commodore Turbo; Holden VN Commodore SS	Max Bonney	3	-	-	3	-	-	-	-	6
15	Tony Farrell	34	Honda CRX	Tony Farrell	-	-	3	-	-	-	-	3	6
19	Terry Skeene		Holden VL Commodore Turbo	Terry Skeene	-	4	-	-	-	-	-	-	4
20	Alf Grant	14	Mazda RX-7 Turbo	Yokohama Tyres	-	3	-	-	-	-	-	-	3
21	Tom Watkinson		Suzuki Swift GTi	Tom Watkinson	-	0.5	-	-	2	-	-	-	2.5
22	Jim Keogh	11	BMW 325iS	Jim Keogh	-	-	-	-	1	-	-	-	1
22	Ian Green		Mazda RX-7 Turbo	Starion Enterprises	-	-	-	-	-	1	-	-	1
22	Greg Crick		Mazda RX-7 Turbo	Yokohama Tyres Australia Pty Ltd	1	-	-	-	-	-	-	-	1
22	Ian Thompson	63	Honda CRX	Ian Thompson	-	1	-	-	-	-	-	-	1
22	Lou Renato	40	Honda CRX	Forte Lubrications Pty Ltd	-	-	-	-	-	-	-	1	1
