= 1990 Australian Production Car Championship =

The 1990 Australian Production Car Championship was an Australian motor racing title for Group 3E Series Production Cars. It has been recognised by the Confederation of Australian Motor Sport as the fourth Australian Production Car Championship.

After Production Car racing was dominated by the turbocharged Mitsubishi Starion, Mazda RX-7 and Toyota Supras from 1984 until 1989, CAMS banned turbo and V8 engined cars from 1990 in a bid to bring public interest back into the series. The dominant competitors in the championship were the Australian built Holden Commodores and Ford Falcons powered by naturally aspirated six cylinder engines.

The championship was won by Kent Youlden driving a Ford Falcon EA S.

== Schedule ==
The championship was contested over eight rounds with one race per round.

Round	Circuit	State	Date	Winning driver	Car
1	Amaroo Park	New South Wales	25 February	Kent Youlden	Ford Falcon EA S
2	Symmons Plains	Tasmania	11 March	Ken Douglas	Ford Falcon EA S
3	Phillip Island	Victoria	25 March	Ken Douglas	Ford Falcon EA S
4	Winton	Victoria	8 April	Kent Youlden	Ford Falcon EA S
5	Mallala	South Australia	13 June	Peter Fitzgerald	Holden Commodore VN S
6	Oran Park	New South Wales	15 July	Peter Fitzgerald	Holden Commodore VN S
7	Lakeside	Queensland	29 July	Tony Scott	Holden Commodore VN S
8	Oran Park	New South Wales	19 August	Tony Scott	Holden Commodore VN S

== Points system ==
Points were awarded on a 20-15-12-10-8-6-4-3-2-1 basis to the top ten placegetters in each round. Only the best seven round results were used to determine a drivers final pointscore, any other points being discarded.

== Championship standings ==
Position	Driver	No.	Car	Entrant	Ama	Sym	Phi	Win	Mal	Ora	Lak	Ora	Total
1	Kent Youlden	58	Ford Falcon EA S	Kent Youlden	20	15	12	20	15	12	12	-	106
2	Peter Fitzgerald	1	Holden Commodore VN S	Goodyear Tyres	15	10	10	(8)	20	20	15	15	105
3	Ken Douglas	10	Ford Falcon EA S	Douglas Robinson Motorsport	(4)	20	20	12	12	8	10	12	94
4	Tony Scott	6	Holden Commodore VN S	Bridgestone / Southland Mitsubishi	10	3	15	10	(2)	15	20	20	93
5	Jim Zerefos	4	Ford Falcon EA S	Goodyear Australia / Chris Stott	8	12	(3)	15	6	10	6	8	65
6	Roland Hill	3	Holden Commodore VN S	Goodyear Australia	12	8	6	-	10	-	8	1	45
7	Paul Fordham	12	Holden Commodore VN S	SAAS Steering Wheels	6	-	8	4	-	-	-	-	18
8	Steve Masterton	2	Ford Falcon EA S	Steve Masterton Racing	2	-	4	6	4	-	-	-	16
8	Mal Rose	44	Ford Falcon EA S	Paul Flottman	-	-	-	-	-	6	-	10	16
10	Ian Palmer	7	Holden Commodore VN S	Bridgestone / Palmer Promotions	-	4	1	-	3	1	1	3	13
11	Max Bonney	86	Holden Commodore VN S	Max Bonney	-	2	-	2	8	-	-	-	12
12	Gordon Levin	8	Holden Commodore VN S	Gordon Levin	-	-	-	-	-	3	-	6	9
13	Gary Scott		Holden Commodore VN S		1	6	-	-	-	-	-	-	7
14	Phil Alexander	35	Suzuki Swift GTi	Alexander Rotary Pty Ltd	3	-	-	3	-	-	-	-	6
15	Troy Nicholson	55	Holden Commodore VN S	Positive Performance P/L	-	-	-	-	-	4	-	-	4
15	Graham Jonsson		Holden Commodore VN S		-	-	-	-	-	-	4	-	4
15	Todd Wanless		Ford Falcon EA S		-	-	-	-	-	-	-	4	4
15	Tom Watkinson	19	Suzuki Swift GTi	Tom Watkinson	-	-	-	1	-	-	3	-	4
15	Trevor Talbot	75	Ford Falcon EA S	Dukes Body Works	-	1	2	-	1	-	-	-	4
20	Gary McDonald	9	Holden Commodore VN S	Positive Performance	-	-	-	-	-	2	-	-	2
20	Russell Worthington		Suzuki Swift GTi		-	-	-	-	-	-	2	-	2
20	Adrian Mastronardo	27	Ford Falcon EA S	Adrian Mastronardo	-	-	-	-	-	-	-	2	2
