= 1988 Australian Production Car Championship =

The 1988 Australian Production Car Championship was a CAMS sanctioned motor racing championship for Group 3E Series Production Cars. It was the second Australian Production Car Championship and the first to be contested over a national series. The championship was won by Gary Waldon, driving a Mazda RX-7.

== Calendar ==
The championship was contested over an eight-round series with one race per round.

| Round | Circuit | State | Date |
| 1 | Symmons Plains | Tasmania | 13 March |
| 2 | Winton | Victoria | 10 April |
| 3 | Adelaide International Raceway | South Australia | 1 May |
| 4 | Amaroo Park | New South Wales | 15 May |
| 5 | Lakeside | Queensland | 24 July |
| 6 | Oran Park | New South Wales | 28 August |
| 7 | Sandown Park | Victoria | 11 September |
| 8 | Calder | Victoria | 9 October |

== Points system ==
Championship points were awarded on a 20–15–12–10–8–6–4–3–2–1 basis to the top ten finishers in each round. Each driver could only retain his/her best seven round results towards the championship points totals.

== Championship results ==
| Position | Driver | No. | Car | Entrant | Sym | Win | Ade | Ama | Lak | Ora | San | Cal | Total |
| 1 | Garry Waldon | 5 | Mazda RX-7 Turbo | Garry Waldon | - | 20 | 20 | 20 | 20 | 2 | 15 | 20 | 117 |
| 2 | Peter Fitzgerald | 3 & 1 | Holden VL Commodore Turbo & Mazda RX-7 Turbo | Yokohama Tyres | 12 | 15 | 15 | 15 | (6) | 20 | 20 | 15 | 112 |
| 3 | Michael Preston | 11 | Holden VL Commodore Turbo | Michael Preston | 15 | 12 | 12 | 10 | 12 | 15 | - | - | 76 |
| 4 | Mark Gibbs | 50 | Holden VL Commodore Turbo | Bridgestone (Aust) | 20 | 10 | 8 | 12 | 15 | 8 | - | - | 73 |
| 5 | Ken Douglas | 41 | Ford Laser TX3 Turbo & Mazda RX-7 Turbo | Douglas-Robinson Motorsport | 3 | 1 | - | - | 10 | 12 | 12 | 12 | 50 |
| 6 | Allen Fender | 16 | Holden VL Commodore Turbo | Allen Fender | - | - | 2 | 6 | 3 | 6 | 8 | - | 25 |
| 7 | Richard Whyte | 8 | Holden VL Commodore Turbo | Richard Whyte | - | - | 10 | - | - | - | - | 10 | 20 |
| 8 | Tony Scott | 6 | Mitsubishi Starion | Tony Scott | - | - | - | - | 8 | 10 | - | - | 18 |
| 9 | John Bourke | 77 | Toyota Supra | Brian Hilton Toyota | 4 | 8 | - | 3 | 2 | - | - | - | 17 |
| 10 | Malcolm Stenniken | 45 | Holden VL Commodore Turbo | Malcolm Stenniken | 10 | - | - | - | - | - | 6 | - | 16 |
| | Roland Hill | 25 | Holden VL Commodore Turbo | Roland Hill | 2 | 6 | - | 8 | - | - | - | - | 16 |
| 12 | Ian Green | 36 | Mazda RX-7 Turbo | | - | - | - | - | - | 3 | 10 | - | 13 |
| | Jim Zerefos | 4 | Holden VL Commodore Turbo | Jim Zerefos | 8 | 2 | 3 | - | - | - | - | - | 13 |
| 14 | John Phillips | 55 | Holden VL Commodore Turbo | Starion Enterprises | - | 4 | 6 | 2 | - | - | - | - | 12 |
| | Terry Skene | 20 | Holden VL Commodore Turbo | Terry Skene | - | - | 4 | - | 4 | 4 | - | - | 12 |
| 16 | David James | 13 | Holden VL Commodore Turbo | Caltex AFM | 6 | - | - | - | - | - | 2 | 3 | 11 |
| 17 | Brad Jones | 2 | Mitsubishi Starion | BF Goodrich / Kim Jones | - | - | - | - | - | 1 | - | 8 | 9 |
| 18 | Paul Watson | | Holden VL Commodore Turbo | | - | - | - | - | - | - | 3 | 4 | 7 |
| 19 | Matthew Springer | 28 | Holden VL Commodore Turbo | Matthew Springer | - | - | - | - | 1 | - | 4 | 1 | 6 |
| | John Suttor | 22 | Holden VL Commodore Turbo | John B Suttor | - | - | - | - | - | - | - | 6 | 6 |
| 21 | Chris Stott | 15 | Holden VL Commodore Turbo | Jim Zerefos Racing | - | 3 | 1 | - | - | - | - | - | 4 |
| | Peter Dane | | Holden VL Commodore Turbo | | - | - | - | 4 | - | - | - | - | 4 |
| 23 | John White | 3 | Holden VL Commodore Turbo | | - | - | - | - | - | - | - | 2 | 2 |
| 24 | Terry Finnigan | | Holden VL Commodore Turbo | | - | - | - | 1 | - | - | - | - | 1 |
| | John Mott | 51 | Holden VL Commodore Turbo | John Mott | - | - | - | - | - | - | 1 | - | 1 |
| | Greg Crick | 3 | Holden VL Commodore Turbo | Yokohama Tyres | 1 | - | - | - | - | - | - | - | 1 |

== Manufacturers Award ==
| Position | Manufacturer | Car | Points |
| 1 | Mazda | Mazda RX-7 Turbo | 63 |
| 2 | Peugeot | Peugeot 205 GTi | 57 |
| 3 | Suzuki | Suzuki Swift GTi | 49 |
| 4 | Holden | Holden VL Commodore Turbo | 37 |
