= 2018 Australian Production Car Series =

Australian motor racing competition for Group 3E Series Production Cars

The 2018 Australian Production Car Series was an Australian motor racing competition for Group 3E Series Production Cars. It was the third Australian Production Car Series following the discontinuation of the Australian Production Car Championship at the end of 2015.

The series was won by Jim Pollicina and Ryan Simpson driving a Lotus Exige 350 Sport.
