= 1987 Australian Production Car Championship =

The 1987 Australian Production Car Championship was an Australian motor racing competition open to Group E Series Production Cars. The championship was contested over two 30 lap, 60 km heats staged at the Winton circuit in Victoria, Australia on 27 September 1987. The championship winner was determined by a pointscore system which awarded the first twenty placegetters in each heat. The championship was organised by the Benalla Auto Club.

The title, which was recognised by the Confederation of Australian Motor Sport as the first Australian Production Car Championship, was won by Peter Fitzgerald driving a Mitsubishi Starion.

== Championship results ==
Position	Driver	No.	Car	H1	H2
1	Peter Fitzgerald	3	Mitsubishi Starion	1st	1st
2	Phil Brock		Holden VK Commodore	10th	2nd
3	John Bourke	77	Toyota Supra	4th	6th
4	Mike Glynn		Mitsubishi Starion	9th	3rd
5	Des Gibbs		Mitsubishi Starion	7th	5th
6	Kent Youlden		Holden VK Commodore	?	4th
?	Leo Geoghegan		Mitsubishi Starion	8th	7th
?	Brad Jones	2	Mitsubishi Starion	2nd	DNF
?	Kevin Bartlett	9	Mitsubishi Starion	3rd	DNF
?	Peter Dane		Holden VK Commodore	5th	?
?	Mal Rose		Holden VK Commodore	6th	DNF
?	Tony Greig		Mitsubishi Starion	?	8th
?	Ian Allen		Holden VK Commodore	?	9th
?	Ian Green		Mazda RX-7	?	10th
?	Mark Gibbs		Holden VK Commodore	?	?
?	Shane Press		Holden VK Commodore	?	?
?	Brett Youlden		Holden VK Commodore	?	?
?	Michael Preston		Holden VL Commodore	?	?
?	Peter Granger		Holden VL Commodore	?	?
?	Roland Hill		Holden VL Commodore	?	?
?	Ian Stewart		?	?	?
?	Ron Ison		Mazda RX-7	?	?
?	Kim Jane		Holden VK Commodore	?	?
?	Geoff Newton		?	?	?
?	John Phillips		Holden VL Commodore	DNF	?
?	Gary Waldon		Mazda RX-7	DNF	DNS
?	?		?	?	?
?	?		?	?	?
?	?		?	?	?
?	?		?	?	?

=== Notes ===
- Number of competitors: 53
- Number of competitors selected for the championship: 30
- Fastest lap in Heat 1: 1m 12.14s, Gary Waldon, (Mazda RX-7), (new lap record)
- Fastest lap in Heat 2: 1m 12.22s, Peter Fitzgerald, (Mitsubishi Starion),

== Championship name ==
The terms Australian Production Car Championship, Australian Series Production Championship and Australian Production Touring Car Championship have been used in relation to this competition. The name Australian Production Car Championship was used by the Confederation of Australian Motor Sport and has been used here.
