= 1991 Australian Production Car Championship =

The 1991 Australian Production Car Championship was a CAMS sanctioned national motor racing title for drivers of Group 3E Series Production Cars. The title was contested over an eight-round series.

- Round 1, Sandown, Victoria, 24 February
- Round 2, Symmons Plains, Tasmania, 10 March
- Round 3, Winton, Victoria, 5 May
- Round 4, Amaroo Park, New South Wales, 2 June
- Round 5, Mallala, South Australia, 23 June
- Round 6, Lakeside, Queensland, 14 July
- Round 7, Oran Park, New South Wales, 11 August
- Round 8, Sandown, Victoria, 1 September

== Results ==
Position	Driver	No	Car	Entrant	Rd 1	Rd 2	Rd 3	Rd 4	Rd 5	Rd 6	Rd 7	Rd 8	Total
1	Kent Youlden	1	Ford EA Falcon	Kent Youlden	10	15	20	12	20	(3)	8	10	95
2	Mal Rose	44	Ford EA Falcon	Mal Rose	20	20	(4)	20	6	10	6	6	88
3	Tony Scott	6	Holden VN Commodore	Tony Scott	12	10	6	8	10	20	-	20	86
4	Jim Zerefos	2	Ford EA Falcon	Goodyear Australia	15	8	15	10	15	6	15	-	84
5	Peter Fitzgerald	3	Holden VN Commodore	Goodyear Tyres	(1)	6	12	15	12	15	12	8	80
6	Ken Douglas	10	Ford EA Falcon	Douglas Robinson Motor Sport	8	12	10	-	4	4	20	-	58
7	Paul Fordham	12	Holden VN Commodore	Valvoline Australia	4	3	-	6	8	-	4	15	40
8	Ian Palmer	7	Holden VN Commodore	Palmer Promotions	6	4	-	4	-	8	2	12	36
9	Roland Hill	5	Holden VN Commodore	Goodyear Tyres	2	-	2	2	1	12	10	2	31
10	Adrian Mastronardo	27	Ford EA Falcon	Adrian Mastronardo	-	-	-	3	3	1	3	4	14
11	Mark Larkham	9	Ford EA Falcon		-	2	8	1	-	-	-	-	11
12	Garry Rogers	13	Holden VN Commodore	Valvoline Australia	3	-	3	-	2	-	-	-	8
13	Don Watson	15	Ford EA Falcon	Douglas Robinson Motor Sport	-	-	1	-	-	-	-	3	4
14	Robert Ogilvie		Holden Commodore		-	-	-	-	-	2	-	-	2
15	Glenn Cullen		Holden VN Commodore		-	1	-	-	-	-	-	-	1
15	Gordon Leven		Holden VN Commodore		-	-	-	-	-	-	1	-	1
15	Chris Muscat		Ford EA Falcon		-	-	-	-	-	-	-	1	1
Front Wheel Drive Class
1	Paul Gover	23	Toyota Corolla SX	Paul Gover	6	9	3	6	6	4	-	3	37
2	Geoff Forshaw		Suzuki Swift		-	-	9	9	-	-	9	9	36
3	Justin Barham	28	Toyota Corolla SX	Charlestown Toyota	9	6	1	3	1	-	-	-	20
4	Harry Bargwanna	97	Toyota Corolla		-	-	-	-	-	9	4	6	19
5	Ross Burbidge	18	Toyota Corolla SX	Ross Burbidge	-	4	2	4	3	6	-	-	19
6	David Sala	33	Toyota Corolla SX	David Sala	-	-	-	-	9	-	1	1	11
7	Darryl Bennett	36	Toyota Corolla SX	Darryl Bennett	-	-	6	-	4	-	-	-	10
8	Tom Watkinson		Toyota Corolla		4	-	4	-	-	-	2	-	10
9	Tony Regan	20	Toyota Corolla SX	Tony Regan	-	-	-	1	2	3	-	4	10
10	Mark Brame		Suzuki Swift GTi		-	-	-	-	-	-	6	-	6
11	Noel Gibson		Ford Laser TX3		3	-	-	-	-	-	-	-	3
11	Peter Mitchell	17	Toyota Corolla	Peter Mitchell	-	3	-	-	-	-	-	-	3
11	Phil Alexander		Toyota Corolla		-	-	-	-	-	-	3	-	3
14	Danny Bogut	21	Suzuki Swift GTi	Danny Bogut	1	2	-	-	-	-	-	-	3
14	Colin Osborne		Toyota Corolla		-	-	-	-	-	1	-	2	3
16	Craig Dare		Suzuki Swift GTi		2	-	-	-	-	-	-	-	2
16	Kevin Burton		Mitsubishi Lancer		-	-	-	2	-	-	-	-	2
16	Russell Worthington		Suzuki Swift		-	-	-	-	-	2	-	-	2

Championship points were awarded on a 20-15-12-10-8-6-4-3-2-1 basis for the top ten outright places at each round. Points for the Front Wheel Drive Class, in which cars were restricted to engines of under 2000cc capacity, were awarded on a 9-6-4-3-2-1 basis for the top six class places at each round. Drivers could retain the points from their best seven round results.
