= Ford Falcon (EA) =

Australian full-size car

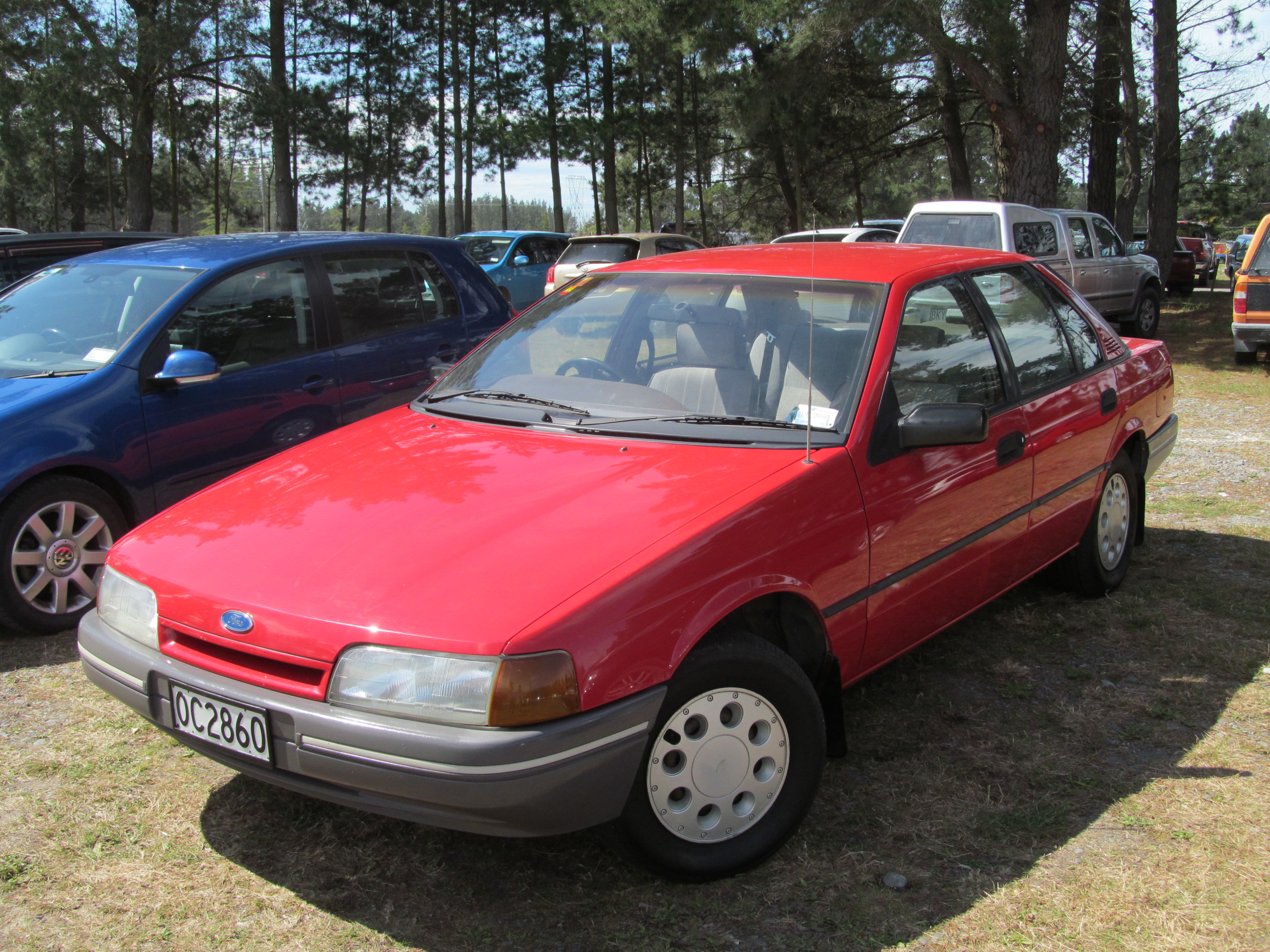
- Ford Falcon (EA) GL sedan

Overview
- Manufacturer: Ford Australia
- Also called: Ford Fairmont (EA)
- Production: March 1988 – July 1991
- Assembly: Australia; New Zealand

Body and chassis
- Class: Full-size
- Body style: 4-door sedan 5-door station wagon
- Related: Ford Fairlane (NA); Ford LTD (DA)

Powertrain
- Engine: 3.2 L Ford I6 (petrol); 3.9 L Ford I6 (petrol)
- Transmission: 3-speed M51 automatic 4-speed M85LE automatic 5-speed BorgWarner T50D manual

Dimensions
- Length: Sedan: 4,811 mm (189.4 in); Wagon: 5,003 mm (197.0 in)
- Width: 1,857 mm (73.1 in)
- Height: Sedan: 1,399 mm (55.1 in); Wagon: 1,483 mm (58.4 in)
- Kerb weight: Sedan: 1,418 kg (3,126.2 lb); Wagon: 1,508 kg (3,324.6 lb)

Chronology
- Predecessor: Ford Falcon (XF)
- Successor: Ford Falcon (EB)

The Ford Falcon (EA) is a full-size car that was produced by Ford Australia from 1988 to 1991. It was the first iteration of the fifth generation of the Falcon and also included the Ford Fairmont (EA)—the luxury-oriented version.

== Development ==
The result of a A$700 million development program, the EA Falcon bore a passing resemblance to the European Ford Scorpio with the US Ford Taurus also influential in the look of the EA car. However under the skin, it remained an entirely Australian design, and is credited as the first Falcon model to employ wind tunnel testing. Developed under the codename EA26 (E for the large size, A for Australia, 26 for the (usually in sequence) global project number), it would retain the traditional Falcon hallmarks of width and rear-wheel drive. This had proven to be a successful strategy during the preceding decade; as the 1979 oil crisis eased, the XE and XF model Falcons had become Australia's top-selling car, overtaking their key rival, the compact Holden Commodore.

In addition, Ford's dominance of the taxi market in Australia meant that a car that could comfortably seat three along the back seat—and even the front, with a bench seat installed—was necessary. It also ensured that Ford could retain, at least until Holden released the new Statesman/Caprice in 1990, the market for official cars for governmental use.

A centre high-mount stop light (CHMSL) was added late in Series I production as it was mandated by 1 July 1989.

=== Engines and transmissions ===
The EA series brought heavily updated inline six engines of single overhead camshaft (OHC) design to the Ford Falcon, replacing the long-running pushrod overhead valve (OHV) 3.3 and 4.1 litre units. All engines were now equipped with electronic fuel injection utilising the corporate Ford EEC-IV engine management system, inclined valve alloy heads and a low profile intake manifold lowering the engine height.

Three engine choices were initially offered:

- a 3.2 litre EFI engine using throttle body injection (TBI), also known as central fuel injection (CFI)
- a 3.9 litre EFI engine also using throttle body injection
- a 3.9 litre MPEFI engine using multi-point or port fuel injection

The base 3.2-litre EFI gave 90 kW (120 hp) at 4000 rpm and 235 N⋅m (173 lb⋅ft) at 3250 rpm. This engine was standard on GL models, although relatively few were sold and many owners of the 3.2 litre found lacklustre torque and the resultant driving behaviour caused increased fuel consumption versus the 3.9. Following the introduction of the new full-sized VN Holden Commodore in August 1988, which featured a 125 kW (168 hp) 3.8 litre V6 as the base engine, Ford quietly discontinued the now-uncompetitive 3.2 litre engine by the end of that year.

Initially a $384 extra cost option on the $20,014 base price of the Falcon GL, and standard on Falcon S and Fairmont, the 3.9-litre EFI (commonly referred to as the CFI or TBI engine) gave significantly higher output, with 120 kW (160 hp) of power at 4250rpm and 311 N⋅m (229 lb⋅ft) of torque at 3250 rpm. It featured the same 91.86 mm bore as the 3.2, but stroke increased from 79 mm to 99.31 mm. It used the same TBI as the 3.2-litre.

Standard on Fairmont Ghia and optional across the range was the multi-point injection (commonly referred to as "MPEFI") 3.9-litre. This utilised port injection along with a low profile intake manifold to increase outputs to 139 kW (186 hp) at 4250 rpm and 338 N⋅m (249 lb⋅ft) at 3500 rpm. The option was signified on vehicles by a "3.9 Multipoint" badge on each front fender behind the wheel arch was silver, except on Falcon S where it was red. On Falcon GL models the fitment of 215/65R14 tyres in place of either 185/75R14 (sedan) or 195/75R14 (wagon) tyres was also linked to the MPEFI option. All 30th Anniversary EA Falcons used a winged Falcon badge in the same fender location regardless of engine option, causing there to be no obvious MPEFI identification.

A five-speed BorgWarner T50D fully synchronised manual and BorgWarner M51 three-speed automatic transmission were offered, however the latter was replaced by a four-speed M85LE in the Series II range.

The initial four-speed automatics suffered poor reliability with loss of drive common within the first 100,000 km (62,000 mi). Noise, vibration, and harshness expertise later found the issue to be destructive harmonics within the transmission and this was remedied with the transmissions later being highly regarded for reliability when properly maintained. Ford would often meet repair costs for these transmissions post-warranty on a goodwill basis. Until the fix, taxi owners would continue to fit reconditioned three-speed M51 automatics to these cars, until the bell housing design was finally changed in later models preventing this practice.

=== Suspension and chassis ===
The EA carried over significant parts of the prior X series Falcon platform to save costs.

Rear suspension on the sedans continued with the coil spring live axle located by upper and lower unequal length trailing arms, and a transverse Watt's linkage. The Watt's linkage had its centre pivot mounted to the differential housing carrying over the roll centre movement compromise from the XE Falcon of 1982.

All wagons carried over the leaf spring suspension of prior Falcons, chosen for their performance in fleet applications including load carrying.

The biggest change for the EA series was the introduction across all models and body types of a new front architecture comprising rack and pinion steering with new front suspension utilising the short and long arm long spindle (SLALS) pseudo double wishbone design. This allowed for longer shocks, optimised ball joint location, improved geometry control, and dramatically improved front end response over the XF Falcon.

Standard suspension was fitted to all Falcon and Fairmont models. The Falcon S lowered ride height by 26 mm (1.0 in) and increased spring and shock rates with larger stabiliser bars. An optional Country Pack suspension offered increased ride height compared to the standard suspension and typically came with enhanced underbody protection including a sump guard.

Brakes were the same across the range using a hub integrated (i.e. not a hat rotor) front ventilated disc design of 287 mm and single piston callipers sliding on the hub carrier. The rear used solid discs also at 287 mm and the rear callipers carried over the Ford handbrake system using a threaded piston applying the handbrake cable forces to the rear disc pads.

== Model range ==
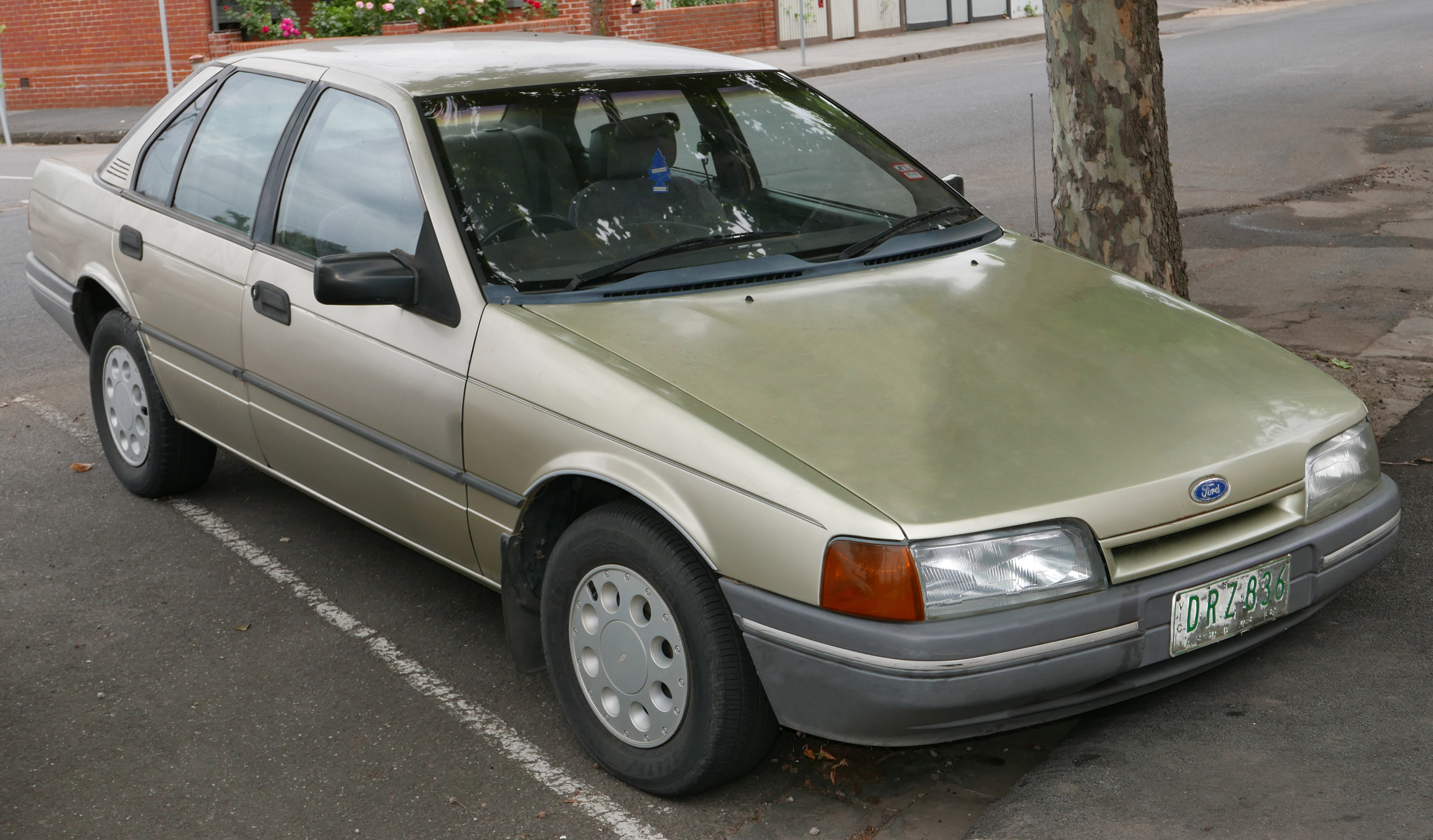
Falcon GL sedan

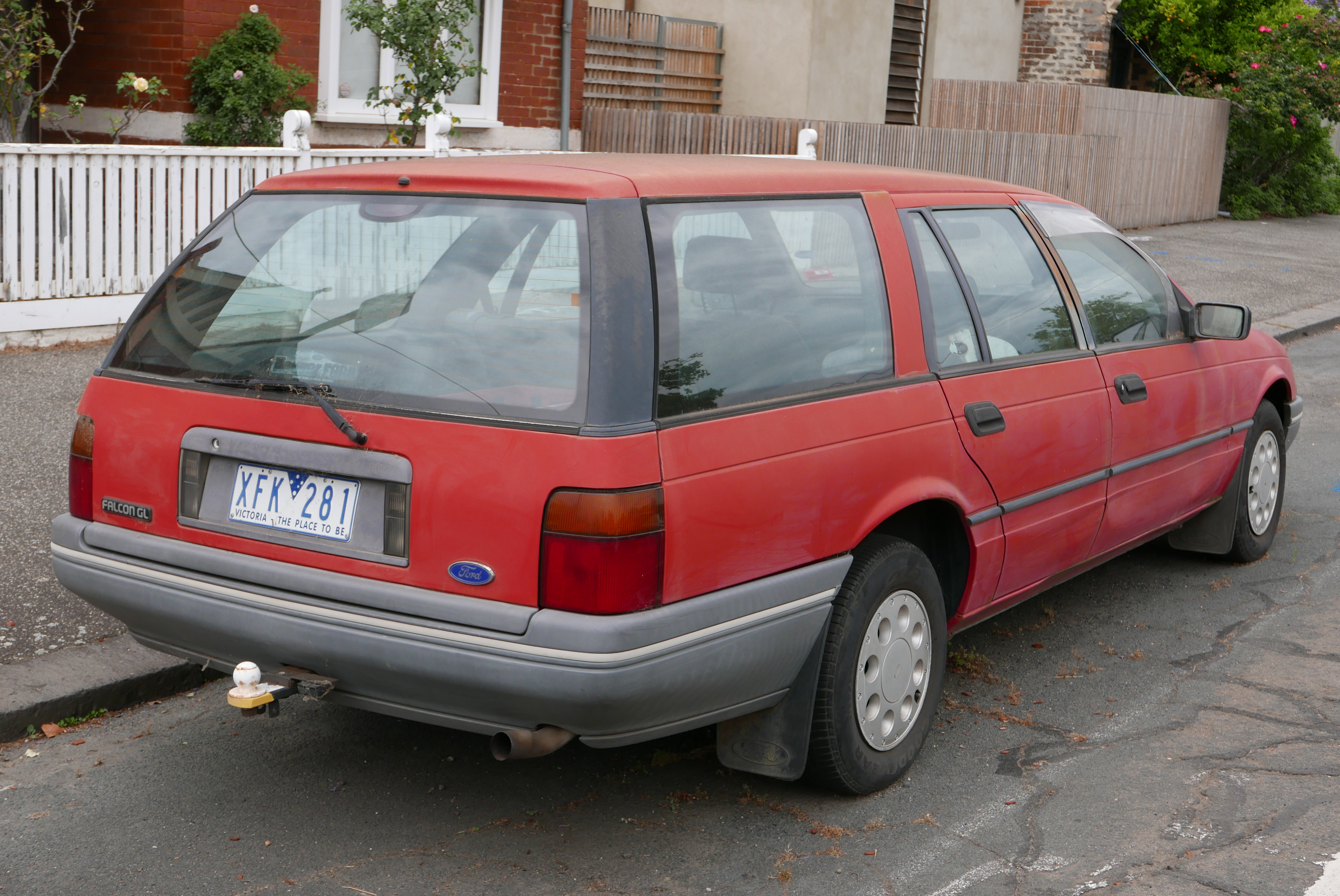
Falcon GL wagon

The EA series was available in four model variants:

- Falcon GL sedan and wagon
- Falcon S sedan and wagon
- Fairmont sedan and wagon
- Fairmont Ghia sedan and wagon

No commercial vehicle variants of the EA were developed and the existing XF Falcon utility and panel van both continued in production alongside the EA passenger vehicles.

=== Series II ===
Launched in October 1989, the Series II brought with it a four-speed automatic transmission, and could be distinguished via body-coloured, rather than black B-pillars. Despite the Series II models having significantly fewer problems than the Series I, Series II prices are also affected by curtailed resale values. The same problem also affects the NA Fairlane and DA LTD, and even the utility and panel van variants, which continued with the older XF architecture.

30th Anniversary

Released in October 1990 the 30th Anniversary commemorative models were identified by a 30th Anniversary winged badge on each front fender. These vehicles carried the vast majority of the technical updates of the EB Falcon.

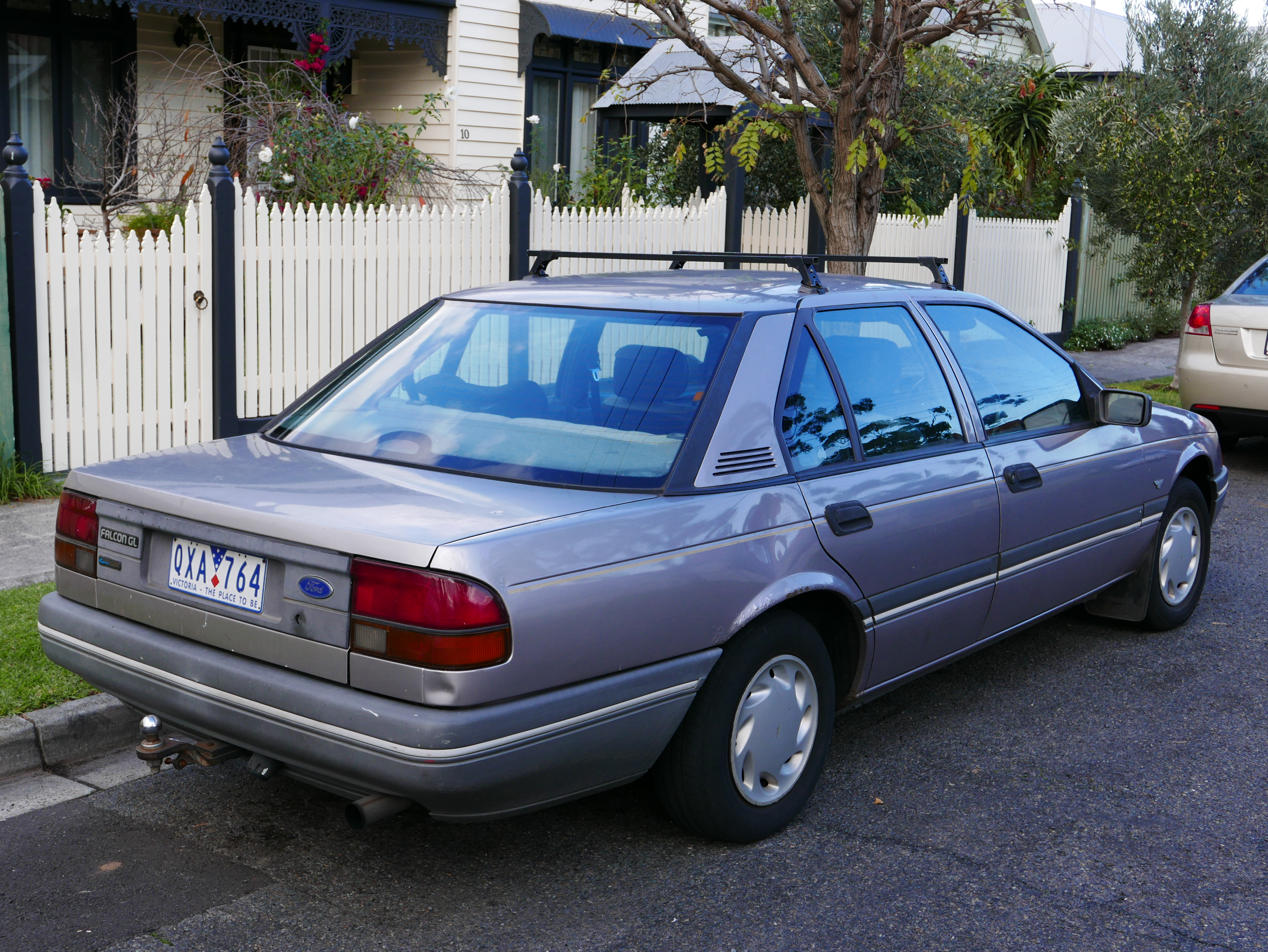
Falcon GL 30th Anniversary sedan (Series II)

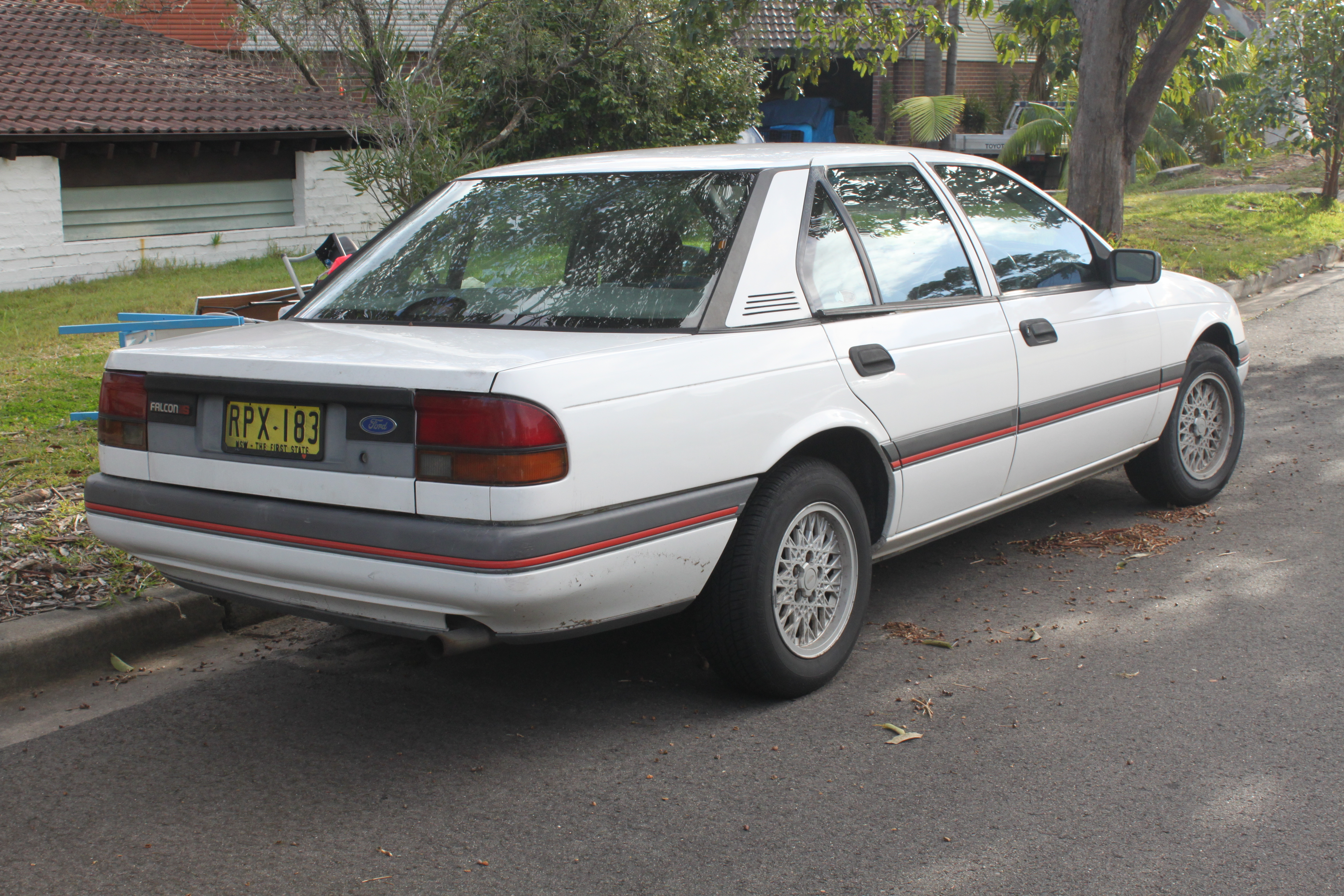
Falcon S sedan (Series II)

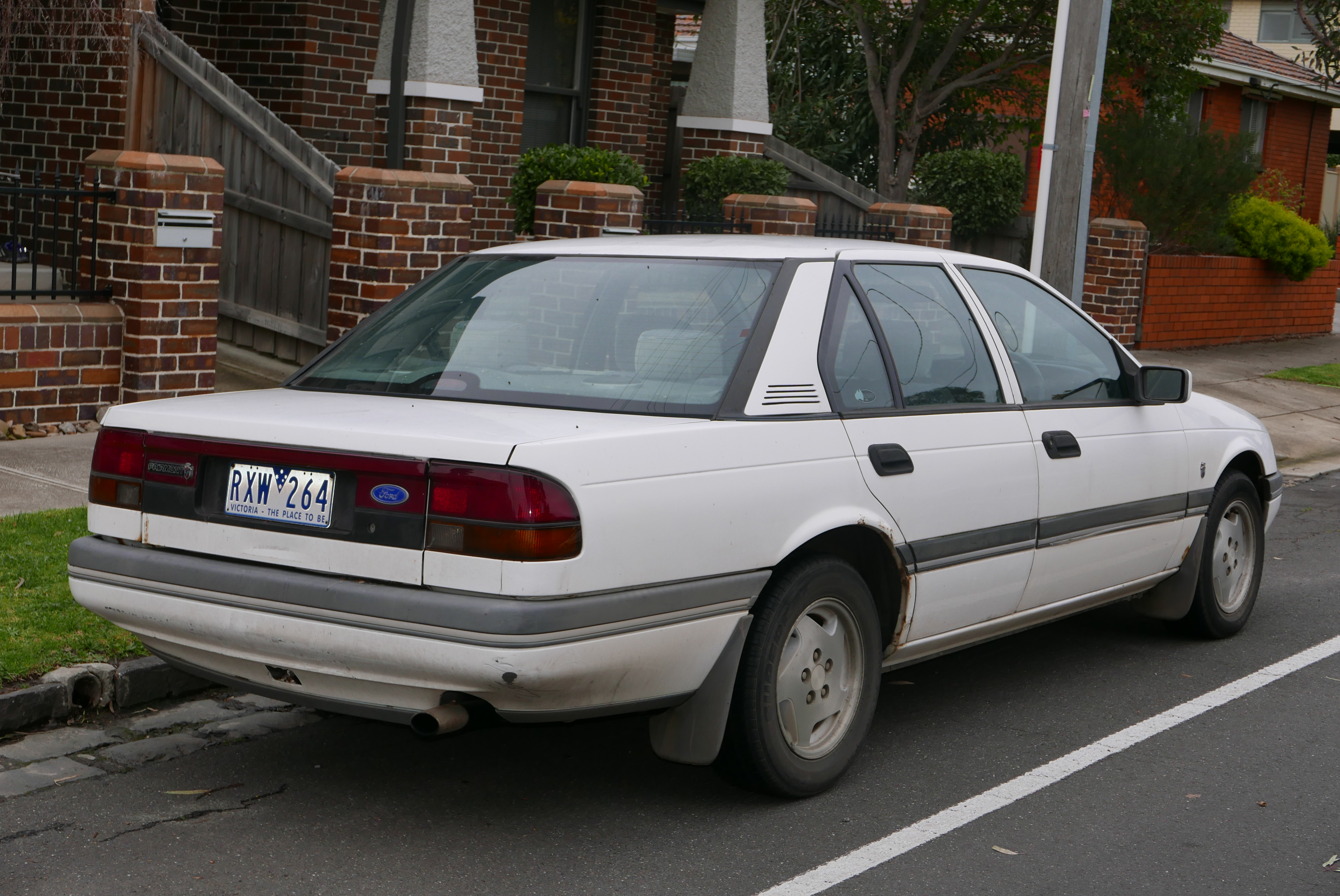
Fairmont Ghia sedan (Series II)

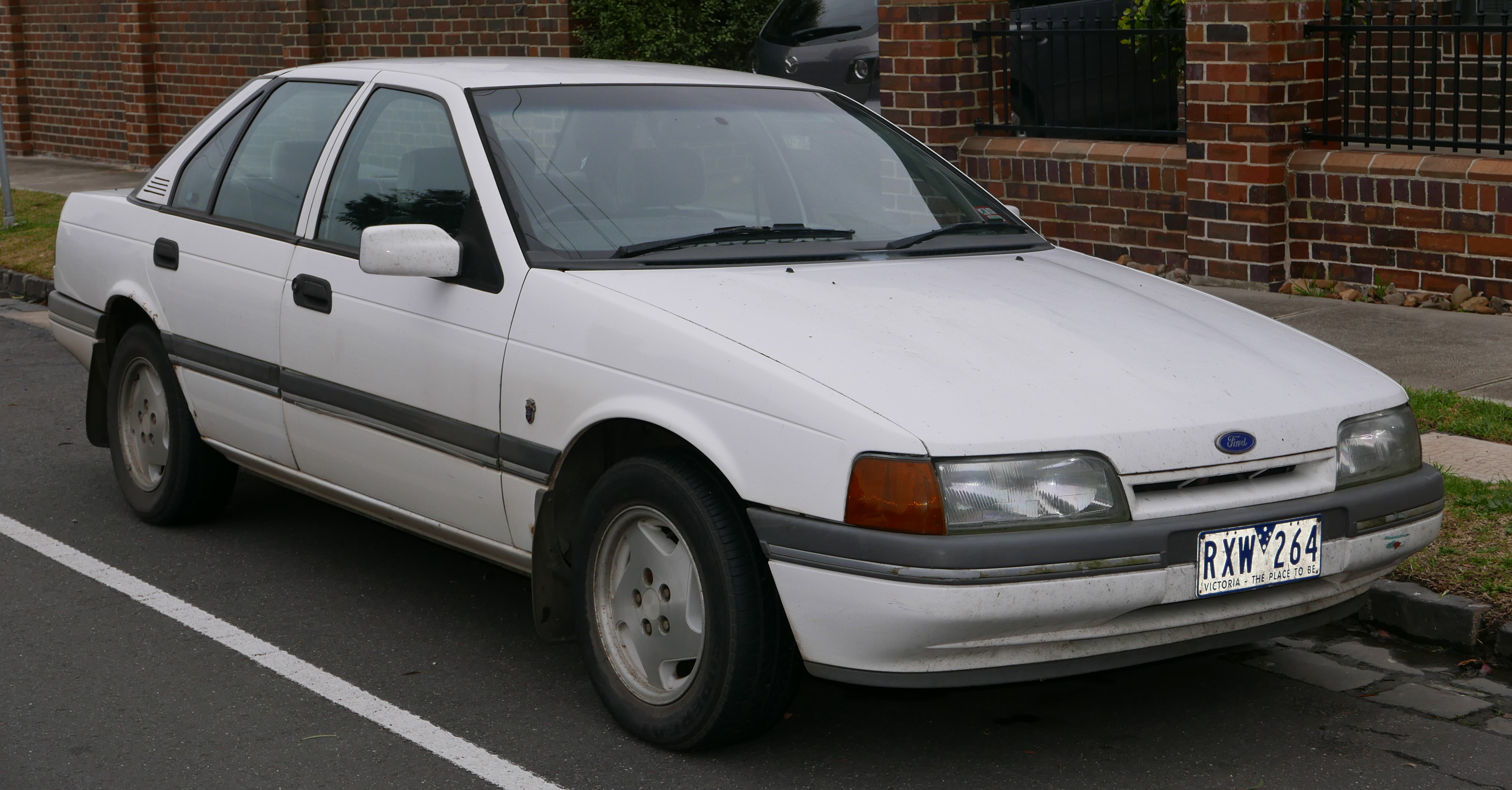
Fairmont Ghia sedan (Series II)

== Production and replacement ==
Production of the EA series had totalled 223,612 vehicles at the time of its replacement by the facelifted Ford Falcon (EB) in 1991.

== Aftermarket performance models ==
Due to the absence of a V8 engine and high performance model, the EA attracted significant interest from the Australian aftermarket industry hoping to gain Ford's approval for a factory backed model.

These included:

- Brock B8
- Advanced Induction Technology ("AIT") offering intercooled turbo kits sold through many Ford dealers
- EA SVO
- APV SR3900
- EA TSS
- DJR EA Falcon
- Phase Autos HO Phase 7
- EA AVO

Brock B8

Australian racing identity Peter Brock formed Austech Automotive Developments to produce a selection of vehicles based on the S and Fairmont Ghia models. All Brock EA Falcons featured a unique body kit, 16inch wheel package and interior upgrades. The latter used the standard seats bolstered and trimmed in a cloth specific to the model. Brock also improved the power output through a reprofiled camshaft, ECU tuning and modification to the induction and exhaust systems. A suspension upgrade was also performed, improving handling and ride quality.

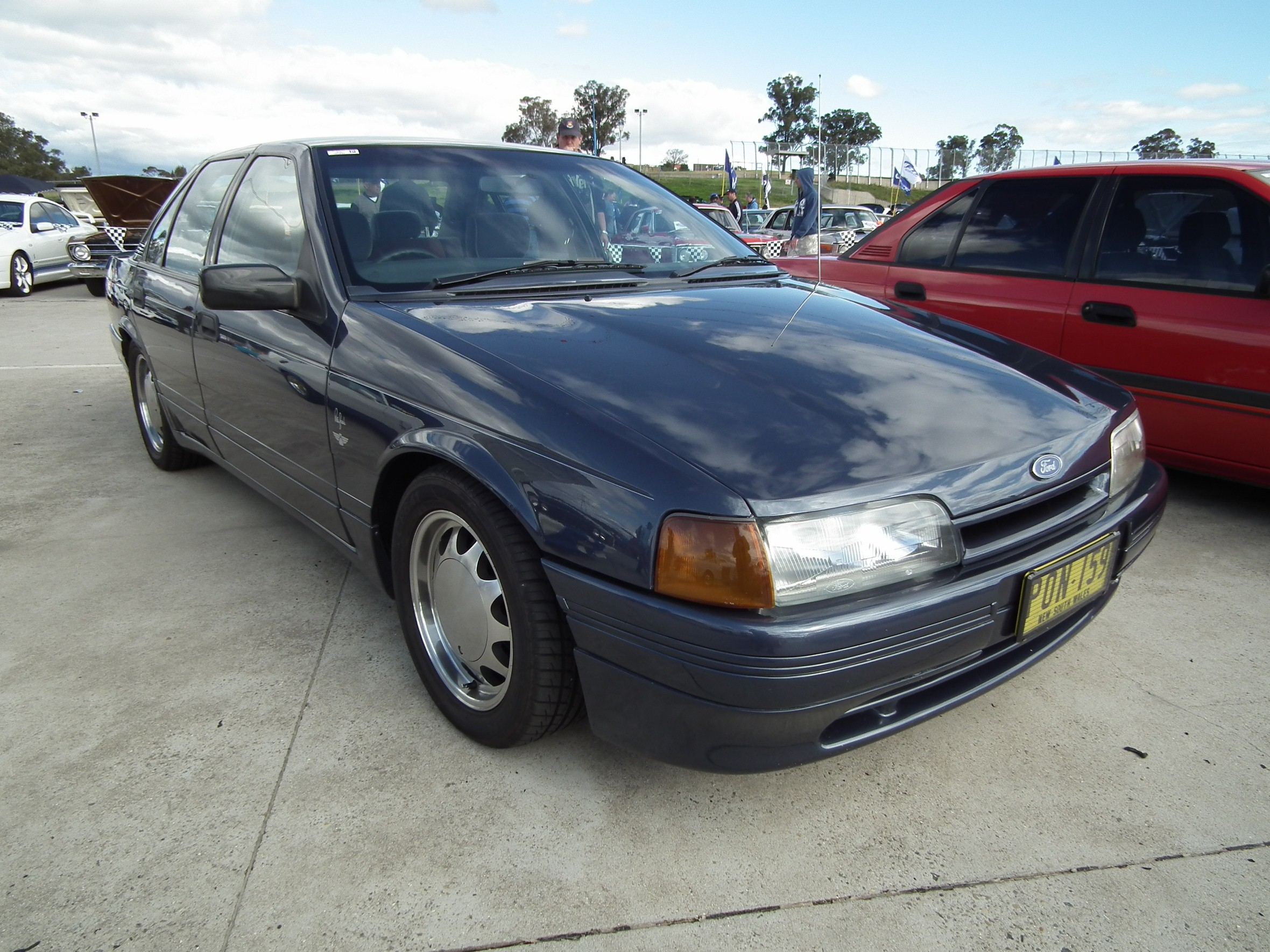
Ford EA Falcon Brock B8 sedan

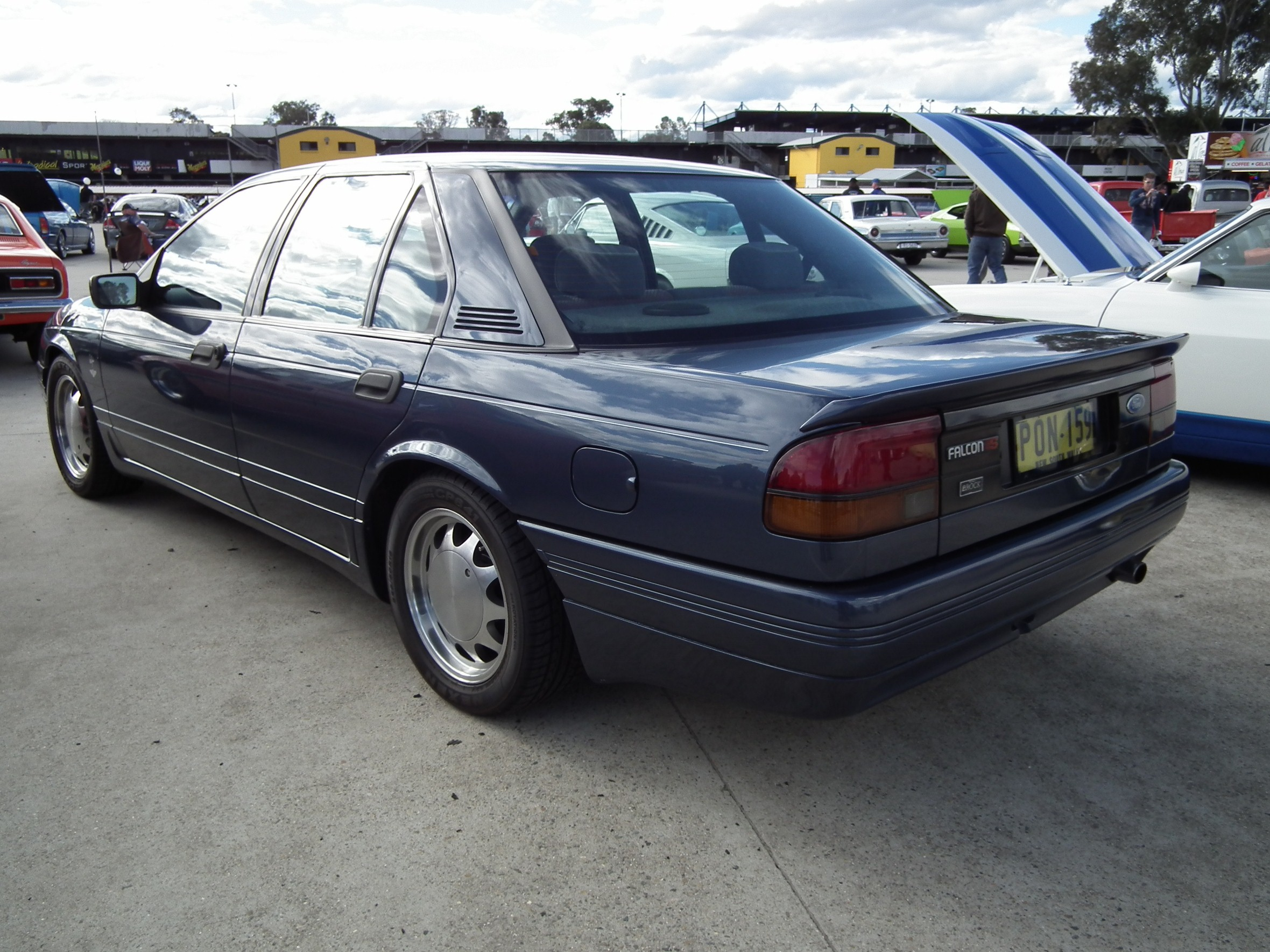
Ford EA Falcon Brock B8 sedan

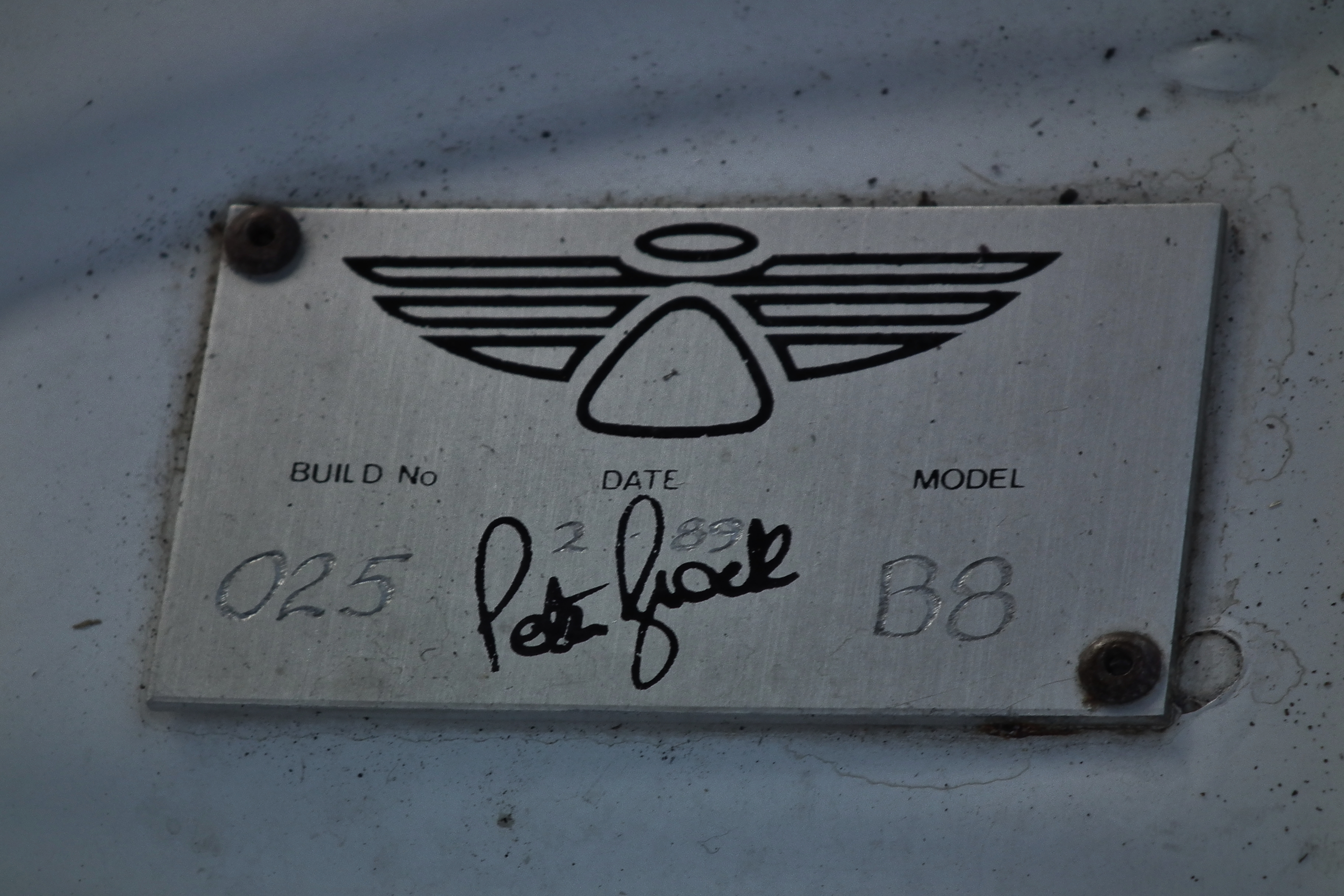
Ford EA Falcon Brock B8 build plate

Advanced Induction Technology ("AIT")

One of the premium offerings for the EA Series was the offering of intercooled turbo kits sold through many Ford dealers. The kit used a front mount intercooler fed by extra air vents in the bumper, turbocharger, extra injectors and was signified by a build plate and instrumentation markings.

EA SVO

With over 1000 built, the EA SVO was the most successful aftermarket option. A creation from Australian motor racing driver and engineer Mick Webb, the EA SVO came with ROH 16-inch wheels, Recaro seats, MoMo steering wheels, suspension upgrades including Bilstein Shock Absorbers, engine modifications, spoilers and two tone grey paint work.

EA TSS

The EA TSS was a series of options from body kit manufacture GP Sportscars. These cars were known for the option of a JDD Twin Tire system and Sprintex supercharger system. GP also manufactured a complete body styling kit, and interior package. As the TSS was a range of options, rather than a specific model, an interested owner could have a complete car optioned up, or just specific options. As a result, some featured either just the supercharged motor, or body kit.

EA AVO

An Australian turbocharging company, AVO, built up a turbocharged EA falcon that held the world record for the fastest caravan tow, at 204.4 km (127.0 mi).

== Motorsport ==
Kent Youlden won the Australian Production Car Championship in both 1990 and 1991 driving an EA Falcon.

== See also ==
- Ford Falcon (XF) – Utility pickup and panel van of the Falcon line running concurrently with the EA series sedans and wagons
