= Australian Motor Racing Series =

The Australian Motor Racing Series (sometimes known as Australian Motor Racing Championships) is a collection of national motor racing series travelling to a series of circuits across Australia under a single banner. These race meetings represent the banner race meetings for the Australian Auto Sport Alliance who sanction the series.

There have been two iterations of the series. The first ran from 2005 to 2008 before folding due to lack of numbers. The series was revived in 2019 with a similar concept and the same name, before a name change in 2023 to Hi-Tec Oils Super Series reflecting the title sponsor.

== Current Series ==
Since its revival in 2019, the series has typically consisted of six race meetings held in the eastern states of Australia. The series describes itself as providing "...a televised platform for the aspiring race car driver to transition from State to National Competition".

For the past few years, the TA2 Racing Muscle Car Series has been the headline category for the series and races at every event. A wide variety of other categories have raced at the meetings.

In 2024, some of the categories which raced as part of the series included:

- Legend cars
- Formula Vee
- Australian Drivers Championship / Hyper Racer X1
- Superkarts
- Mazda RX-8 (production car spec)
- Stock cars (former NASCAR/AUSCAR cars)
- Hyundai Excel (production car)
- GT Racing New Zealand
- Summerset GT New Zealand
- NAPA Central Muscle Cars

The series is televised on multiple platforms including SBS and its streaming platform SBS On Demand, the pay TV network Fox Sports (Australia) and its associated streaming platform Kayo, and YouTube.

== History ==
=== 2005-2008 ===
The series began as a second and third tier collection of national motor racing series in 2005 providing a home for series such as Formula Holden, Formula 3, Sports Sedan, Production Cars, Truck Racing, Saloon Cars, Commodore Cup and Australian Touring Car Challenge. A successful 2005 series was offset by trouble brewing as CAMS who sanctioned the series wanted to de-register series with dropping numbers, while other series, led mainly by Formula 3 were looking for increased exposure to their series. What resulted was division amongst the AMRS categories, the majority of whom left to join the Shannons Nationals series of categories sanctioned by CAMS while the AMRS itself made the transition to AASA sanctioning.

Without the CAMS categories that filled half of the 2005 program some new categories had to be created, with the intent of capturing categories that had been disenfranchised by CAMS. The series was centred on existing categories, the popular Touring Car Challenge was a mixed bag category made up of cars left over from several categories, Group A touring cars not quite old enough the race as a historic category, older V8 Supercars no longer allowed to enter the second tier Fujitsu V8 Supercars Series, and cars from Super Touring and Future Touring categories whose series had died in the early 2000s. Thundersports was made up of a category called Future Racers, championed by Peter Brock and Ross Palmer of PROCAR fame it had never taken off and CAMS had refused to sanction the category as it was broadly very similar to the Aussie Racing Cars class. Several cars had been built and made a natural core for a sports car class and the regulations were opened for several Sports Prototype classes, with European LMP3 and the motorcycle powered Supersports classes targeted although current outright Le Mans cars were theoretically permitted. Formula 4000, the new name for Formula Holden also fronted, with the class expanded to include OzBOSS, a local variation of the European Formula BOSS (Big Open Single Seater), designed to encourage a wide variety of open wheel racing cars.

Production Touring Cars was a variation of the cars eligible for Australian Production Car Championship, although there was an emphasis placed on cars with as few modifications as possible from road specification, something which the APCC no longer represented. 3.3 litre Holdens was a Victorian-based variation of the popular entry level HQ Holden category. Unlike HQ Holdens where only the HQ model of Holden Kingswood was permitted, later models HJ, HX and HZ were also permitted. Classic Touring Cars was more or less a direct copy of Group N Historic Touring cars. Super Tin Tops was a touring car type of category intended for slower and less modified cars than those in the Touring Car Challenge, the obvious targets were competitors in Improved Production and Sports Sedans and more limited categories like Saloon Cars and Commodore Cup.

Controversially, Stockcar Thunder Road was included, intending to provide the once popular Australian NASCAR competitors a category to race in, however after much hype and promotion no competitors emerged.

=== Continued growth ===
The pre-existing categories grew promisingly with Touring Car Challenge and Thundersports well supported. Production Touring developed its own group of competitors. OzBoss was slow to take off and was quickly merged into Formula 4000 grids. Similarly Super Tin Tops was slow to gather momentum and some Production Sports Car type vehicles were included and Classic Touring Cars were merged as well.

Despite this the series 2006 series ended promisingly and most categories continued to grow into the 2007 season. The Inter Marque Championship for production sports cars was a successful addition to the series, bringing large fields. Another addition was the X Challenge series, providing a destination for competitors in the collapsed Lotus Trophy series, a one make series for racers of Lotus Exige and Lotus Elise cars.

=== 2008 season and legacy ===
The series was retagged as the Australian Motor Racing Championships for the 2008 season. However the new season has seen entries drop across the board, a near nationwide trend but the AMRC has been hit harder than the average. Formula Holden has dwindled to less than a handful of cars and OzBoss, which grew promisingly in 2007 has dwindled also. Thundersports became only contested by the former Future Racers. The faster Sports Prototpyes, typified by the West WR1100 cars have been pushed aside into a new category ProtoSports but because of low numbers has been merged into the OzBoss grids. Inter Marque has left AMRC and the new sports car series, Pirelli Gran Turismo Championship, has been poorly supported. The April round, held at Calder Park Raceway has seen not a single grid, even after merging two or three together, break out of ten cars. The immediate future for the AMRC will be challenging if it can maintain viability. Rounds 5 and 6 did not take place with Round 7 likewise having been cancelled. The series subsequently collapsed. Surviving categories either transferred to CAMS sanctioned motor racing events, like Inter Marque Challenge, and ProtoSports (who eventually became Sports Racer Series) or moved into a new organisation independent of both CAMS and AASA called iRace, most visibly Production Touring Cars, OzBoss and the former Future Racers.

=== Revival ===
The concept was revived in 2019 with the original name Australian Motor Racing Series.

== Champions ==
These are the champions from the AMRS series completed.

=== Touring Car Challenge ===
- 2005 Garry Willmington (Ford EL Falcon)
- 2006 Terry Wyhoon (Ford AU Falcon)
- 2007 Darren Saillard (Ford EL Falcon/Ford AU Falcon)

=== V8 Giants ===
- 2007 Sam Dale (Ford Mustang Cobra R)

=== Formula 4000 ===
- 2005 Peter Hackett (Reynard Holden)
- 2006 Derek Pingel (Reynard Holden)

=== OzBoss ===
- 2007 Ty Hanger (Reynard 95D Holden/Ralt RT4 Ford)

=== Production Touring Cars ===
- 2006 Luke Searle (BMW 130i)
- 2007 Luke Searle (BMW 130i)

=== Thundersports ===
- 2006 Paul Quinn (Future Racer)
- 2007 Tom Drewer (West WR1100)

=== Inter Marque Challenge ===
- 2007 Rod Wilson (Maserati Trofeo)

=== Super Tin Tops ===
- 2006 Michael Ballantyne (Holden VS Commodore)
- 2007 Michael Ballantyne (Holden VS Commodore)
- 2008 Stephen George Anslow (Mazda RX-7)

=== 3.3 Litre Holdens ===
- 2006 Darren Formosa (Holden HX Kingswood)
- 2007 Mark Nottage (Holden Kingswood)
