= Australian Auto Sport Alliance =

Australian Auto-Sport Alliance
- Abbreviation: AASA
- Formation: 2003
- Purpose: Auto racing organization
- Location: Australia
- Region served: Australia
- Website: aasa.com.au

The Australian Auto-Sport Alliance (AASA) is an organisation that promotes and administers motorsport in Australia founded in 2003. The AASA formed due to dissatisfaction with the governing body of Australian motorsport, the Confederation of Australian Motor Sport (CAMS, now Motorsport Australia), and organises race meetings independent of Motorsport Australia. A wholly owned subsidiary of the Benalla Auto Club, who also own Winton Motor Raceway, the association sanctions motor sport in various categories.

== History ==
The AASA was founded in 2003.

In 2016, the AASA sanctioned a round of the Australian Formula Ford Series at Winton, the first time they had sanctioned an established national championship event. This caused controversy however, as CAMS (now Motorsport Australia) official Paul Zsidy competed at this event, in breach of the CAMS constitution. CAMS issued a fine to Zsidy, while AASA chairman Bruce Robertson called for CAMS to reverse this decision. CAMS declined, however, reiterating that members in a governance role are not permitted to compete in events not recognised by CAMS or the FIA.

Further controversy between the AASA and CAMS occurred in 2017 when Grant Denyer and co-driver Dale Moscatt were airlifted to hospital after Denyer crashed during the Lake Mountain Sprint, a round of the AASA sanctioned Australian Tarmac Rally Championship. CAMS expressed concerns about the safety of the event, encouraging a police investigation into the accident, to which AASA chairman Robertson responded that they had sufficient safety and risk management protocols.

In 2018, the AASA sanctioned Australian Motor Racing Series (AMRS) was launched as a competitor to the CAMS sanctioned Shannons Nationals Motor Racing Championships.

In 2023, the Australian Auto-Sport Alliance (AASA) entered into a partnership with Hi-Tec Oils to rebrand the Australian Motor Racing Series (AMRS) as the Hi-Tec Oils Super Series. As part of the agreement, Hi-Tec Oils became the naming rights sponsor, with the series continuing under AASA sanctioning and governance. The rebrand marked an expansion of the championship’s commercial support and profile within Australian circuit racing.

In 2024, the Australian Drivers' Championship was sanctioned by the Australian Auto Sport Alliance, with drivers using Hyper Racer X1s.

In late 2025, the Australian Auto-Sport Alliance (AASA) appointed Marcos Ambrose as Competition and Commercial Director. In this role, Ambrose was tasked with supporting the strategic growth of circuit racing under AASA governance, with a focus on strengthening competition structures and establishing clearer development pathways from grassroots participation through to national-level circuit racing.

== Classes ==
Australian Auto-Sport Alliance (AASA) sanctions and administers all forms of four-wheeled motorsport across Australia and New Zealand, ranging from karting through to national-level circuit racing. Its portfolio also includes off-road racing, speedway, tractor pulling, car shows, track days, and a wide variety of grassroots and competitive motorsport activities.

The Hi-Tec Oils Super Series is the premier circuit racing series sanctioned by AASA. Hi-Tec Oils serves as the series promoter, working in partnership with AASA to manage, govern, and sanction the series.

In late 2025, Marcos Ambrose, Competition & Commercial Director for AASA introduced the AASA Nationals Short Track Series, a circuit racing platform promoted and sanctioned by the AASA. The series was established to provide a cost-effective, grassroots pathway for driver development and progression into higher levels of circuit racing.

The Victorian Motor Racing Championship (VMRC) is a Victorian-based circuit racing championship owned by Winton Motor Raceway operating under the sanctioning of the Australian Auto-Sport Alliance (AASA). The championship provides a structured and accessible platform for grassroots and club-level competitors, catering to a range of vehicle categories and experience levels. VMRC events focus on affordable participation, driver development, and competitive racing within a state-level environment.

== Motorcycles ==
In 2007 the AASA started to promote motorcycle road racing as well as car racing in Queensland. On 28–29 April a meeting took place at Queensland Raceway for cars and motorcycles.

In 2016 the AASA exited motorcycle licensing and sanctioning—forming an alliance with Motorcycling Australia, who took over sanctioning of motorcycle racing events at Winton and Wakefield Park. These changes allowed AASA to concentrate on four-wheeled motoring activities.
