= Mitsubishi Starion =

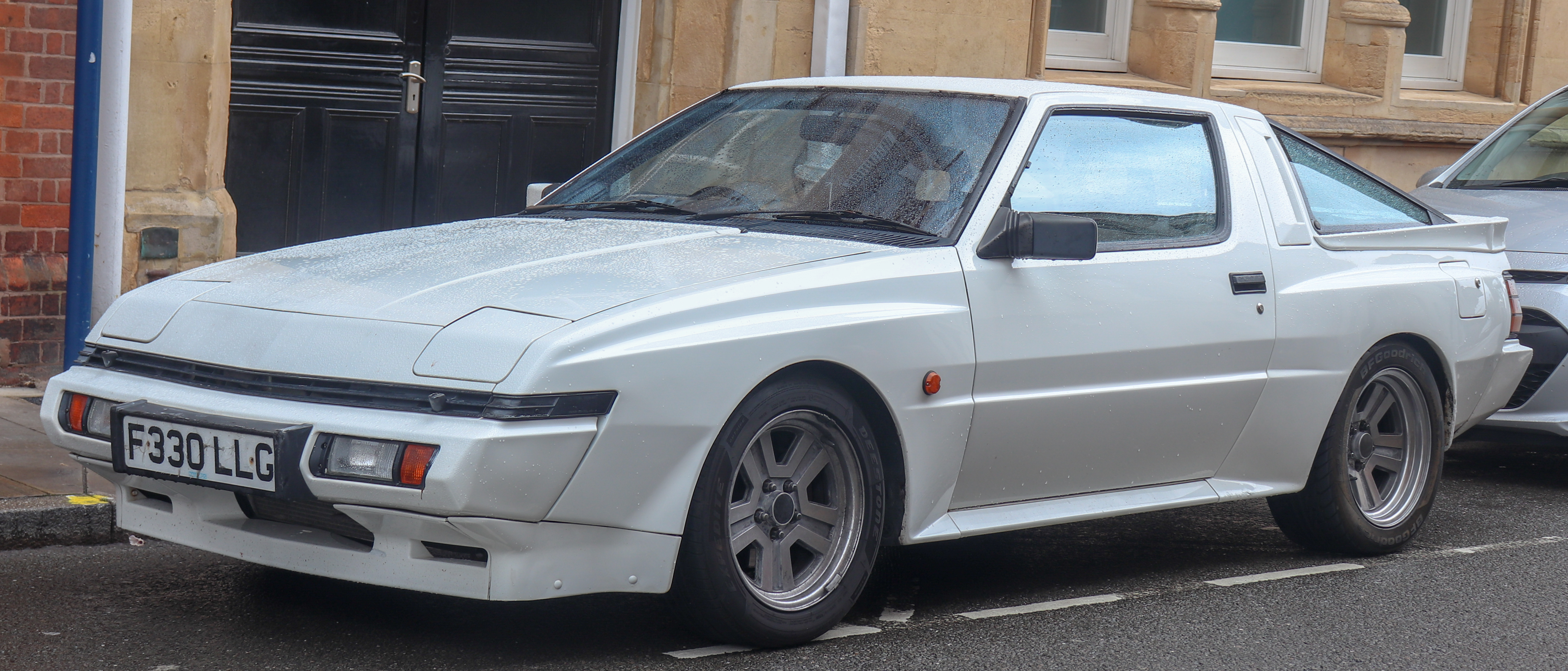
- 1988 Mitsubishi Starion Turbo 2.0 (wide-body)

Overview
- Manufacturer: Mitsubishi Motors
- Also called: Mitsubishi Colt Starion; Chrysler Conquest; Dodge Conquest; Plymouth Conquest
- Production: 1982–1989
- Model years: 1983–1989
- Assembly: Japan: Okazaki, Aichi (Nagoya Plant)
- Designer: Ryu Kaibuchi, Takashi Kono, Masaki Iwamoto, Hidetoshi Aoki

Body and chassis
- Class: Sports car
- Body style: 3-door coupé
- Platform: FR layout

Powertrain
- Engine: 2.0 L G63B I4; 2.0 L G63B turbo I4; 2.6 L G54B turbo I4
- Transmission: 5-speed manual; 4-speed automatic

Dimensions
- Wheelbase: 2,435 mm (95.9 in)
- Length: 4,410 mm (173.6 in) (1982–87); 4,400 mm (173.2 in) (1988–90)
- Width: 1,685 mm (66.3 in) (narrowbody); 1,745 mm (68.7 in) (widebody); 1,735 mm (68.3 in) (1988–89)
- Height: 1,320 mm (52.0 in) (1982–87); 1,275 mm (50.2 in) (1988–89)
- Curb weight: 1,260 kg (2,778 lb) (narrowbody); 1,340 kg (2,954 lb) (widebody)

Chronology
- Predecessor: Mitsubishi Galant Lambda GSR
- Successor: Mitsubishi GTO/Dodge Stealth; Plymouth Laser/Eagle Talon; Mitsubishi Eclipse

The Mitsubishi Starion is a sports car which was manufactured and marketed by Mitsubishi from 1982 until 1989 — with badge engineered variants marketed in North America as the Conquest, under the Chrysler, Dodge, and Plymouth brands. It is a two-door coupé with a fastback design and seating for four passengers. The Starion's straight-four engine is mounted in the front and drives the rear wheels, with some models being turbocharged.

The Starion was one of the first modern Japanese turbocharged performance automobiles with electronic fuel injection.

== Overview ==
Mitsubishi began marketing the Starion in 1982, during a period in which a number of Japanese grand tourer (GT) sports cars were available, including the Nissan Z cars, Mazda RX-7, Toyota Supra and to a lesser extent, the Honda Prelude, Isuzu Piazza and Subaru XT.

The Starion was marketed in the US as the Mitsubishi Starion and badge engineered variants of it were marketed as the Dodge, Plymouth and Chrysler Conquest. In the UK it was sold as the Colt Starion.

It was manufactured in two body configurations, a narrowbody and widebody; the narrower style complied with Japanese exterior dimension regulations taxing larger vehicles and engine displacement exceeding two liters. Only the narrowbody was offered through the 1985.5 model year.

The introduction of the widebody also split the car into two ranges: a non-intercooled lower-horsepower car using the narrow body style and a high-performance intercooled widebody. In most markets, widebody cars were given the label of Starion ESI-R or Conquest TSi. Markets that never received the widebody had the ESI-R label, these cars had similar performance as the widebodies. Widebody cars were offered in 1986–1989 model years in the US.

The Starion was featured in the 1984 movie Cannonball Run II, with Jackie Chan at the wheel.

== Name ==
Mitsubishi says "Starion" is a contraction of "Star of Arion" — and refers to both a star and the mythical horse, Arion. The cover of the original Japanese Starion sales brochure, published by Mitsubishi (May 1982) carried the text: "the name STARION — derived from the combination of star and Arion, Hercules' horse in Greek mythology, symbolizes a sense of the universe, and of power and high performance."

Several sources attribute the name to struggles by Japanese engineers to pronounce the word stallion. An early Japanese television commercial for the Starion closed with a logo of a stallion's head with the word "Starion" below it. One translation of the voiceover says the name refers to a star and the mythical horse, Arion. The Mitsubishi Colt and Mitsubishi Eclipse featured equine names, with the Eclipse named after the champion racehorse. It is possible that this is a multilayered pun.

== Design ==
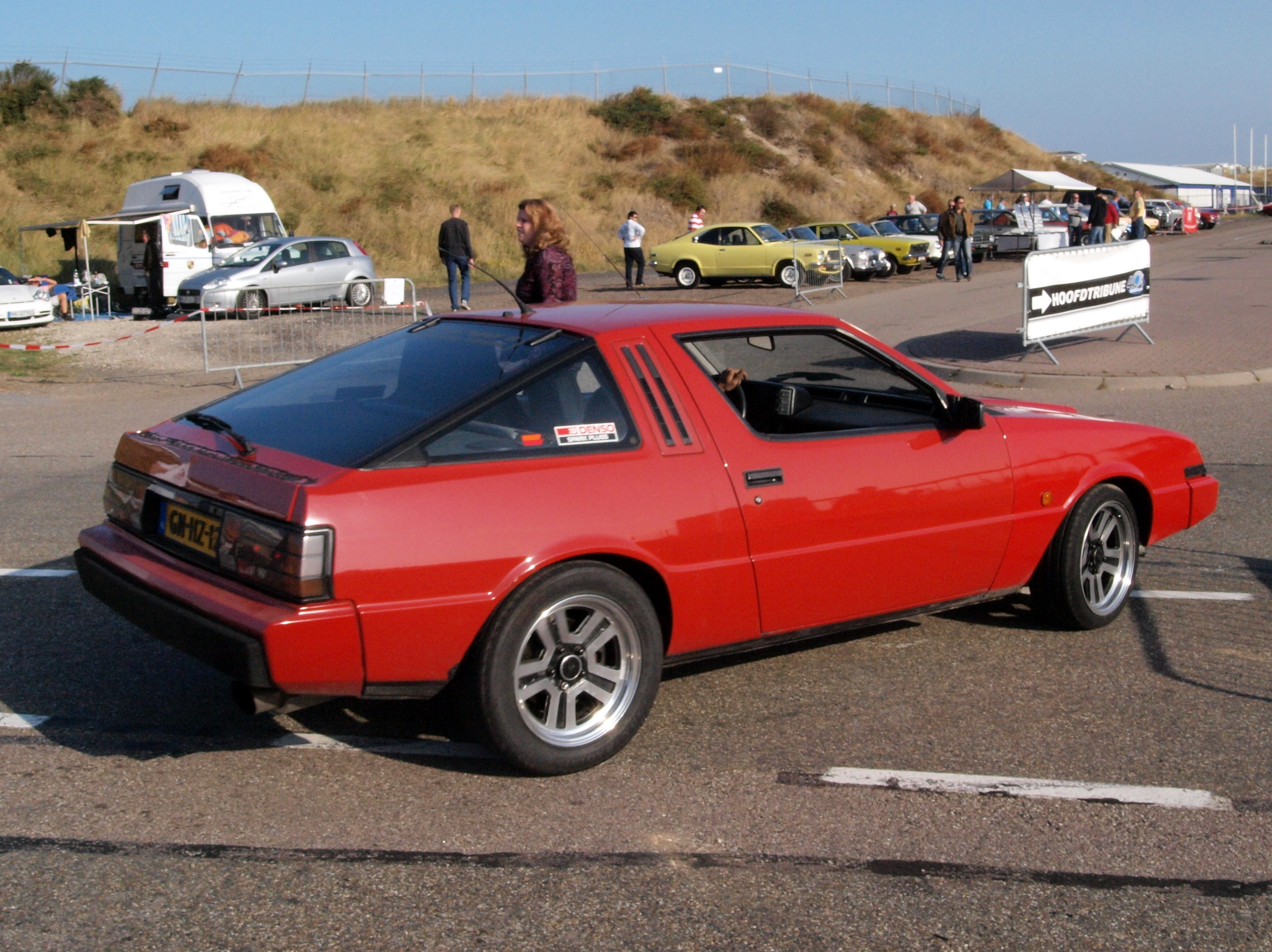
Rear view of earlier, narrow-bodied Starion

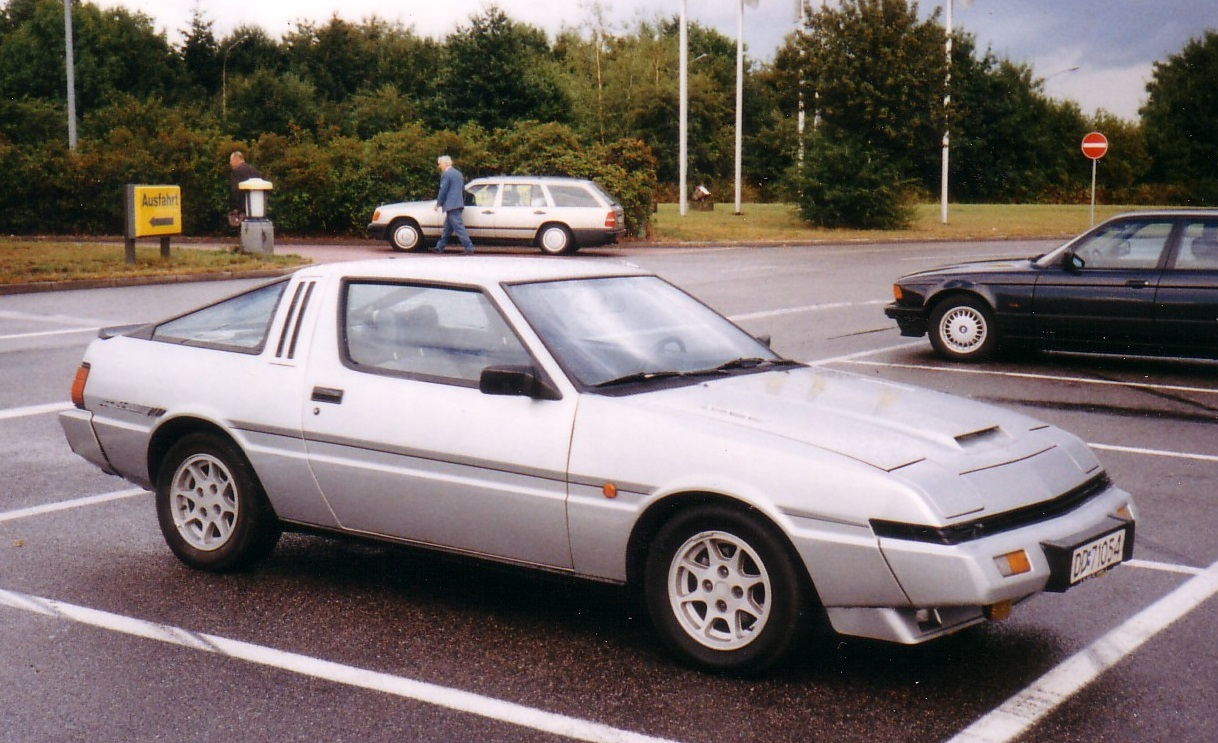
A Mitsubishi Starion Turbo

The Starion uses a traditional front-mounted engine with rear-wheel drive layout. Many came with a limited-slip differential and anti-lock brakes (single channel, rear wheels only) as standard features. The entire chassis was derived from the previous high-performance variant of the Mitsubishi Sapporo or Mitsubishi Galant Lambda sports coupé, with a MacPherson strut suspension and sway bars that were fitted to the front and rear. Rack and pinion steering was not offered, instead gearbox steering was standard on all models.

Engine capacity differed between markets. American customers received the larger SOHC Astron G54B 2.6 L engine. Most markets received the SOHC 2.0 L Sirius G63B engine, subsequently featured in DOHC form in later Mitsubishi sport compacts such as the Mitsubishi Lancer Evolution. Both the 2.0 L and the 2.6 L produced roughly the same horsepower, the larger 2.6 L did have a slight torque advantage and the 2.0L had a higher redline. Reporters of the time considered the 2.0l to be peaky and exciting, while the American market 2.6l had plenty of torque, but was less rewarding. Both engines featured computer-controlled fuel injection and turbocharging. After 1987, European Starion models were also fitted with the 2.6 L engine, as was the GSR-VR for Japan. The move to the 2.6 L in all markets was spurred by emissions restrictions around the world tightening to meet the American standards for lead in fuels. Reviews during the change were negative as many felt the car was slower, for most of these markets this was the case as the engine change also coincided with a move to the heavier body style.

From 1984 until 1987 in Japan a 12-valve (two intake, one exhaust) SOHC intercooled version of the 2.0 L G63B was made available in the top-spec GSR-V (and some GSR-VR) trim grade Starions. This setup was known as the Dual Action Super Head (or DASH for short) due to its ability to activate the third intake valve above a certain RPM, thereby increasing top end response, flow and overall engine performance. Redline was increased to 7000 rpm on these models.

Horsepower for the turbocharged models ranged between 145 and 200 PS (107 and 147 kW; 143 and 197 hp) depending upon which turbocharger was fitted, the presence of an intercooler, and whether the 8-valve or 12-valve head was used.

A naturally aspirated version known as the GX was offered in the Japanese market, with production ending in 1983. The Starion GX was offered without power windows, air conditioning, independent rear suspension, fuel injection or power-assisted steering.

Seating was a 2+2 with rear seats unsuitable for large adults. The front seats were adjustable for lumbar, angle, knee support, position and featured variable-angle side-braces.

Front seat belts were located in the doors for the driver and front passenger. 1987 and later American models featured electrically operated seat belts. Newer models also featured power windows that remained powered up to 30 seconds after the engine was turned off. In Japan, some of the early cars built still featured fender-mounted mirrors in the traditional Japanese style.

A five-speed manual transmission was standard in most models, however, an automatic transmission was sold as an option in some markets.

Later upgrades to the model included an intercooler, five-lug wheels replacing the four-bolt wheels it had shared with the rear wheel drive Mitsubishi Galant Lambda, rear power train changes from four- to six-bolt axles, various fuel management upgrades and upgrades to the transmission.

For the 1989 and 1989 model years, an optional handling package was added. Mitsubishi referred to it as the "Sports Handling Package", option code SH. Chrysler referred to it as the "Performance Handling Package", option code AGA. Both variants are commonly referred to as SHP. The SHP package included adjustable front and rear struts,1 inch wider wheels (from 16 x 7 to 16 x 8 front and 16 x 8 to 16 x 9 rear), and wider tires (225/50 and 245/45). The package can be retrofitted to earlier pre-widebody cars but includes converting to 5-lug hubs from the 4-lug hubs.

The drag coefficient was around 0.32, superior to the Mazda RX-7 and the Nissan 300ZX upon its release.

Notable aftermarket upgrades include multi-port injection (MPI) consisting of standalone engine management (programmable computers) to control individual fuel injectors, one per cylinder versus the stock PCI-ECM two injector system. Two injector systems, primary (idle injector) and secondary (boost injector) non-sequential firing (1983–1986) and sequential firing (1987–1989).

Production: These figures are both cars, total, all styles

- 1986: 19,438
- 1987: 17,605
- 1988: 10,655
- 1989: 1,961
- Figures courtesy of Mitsubishi Japan.

== Models ==
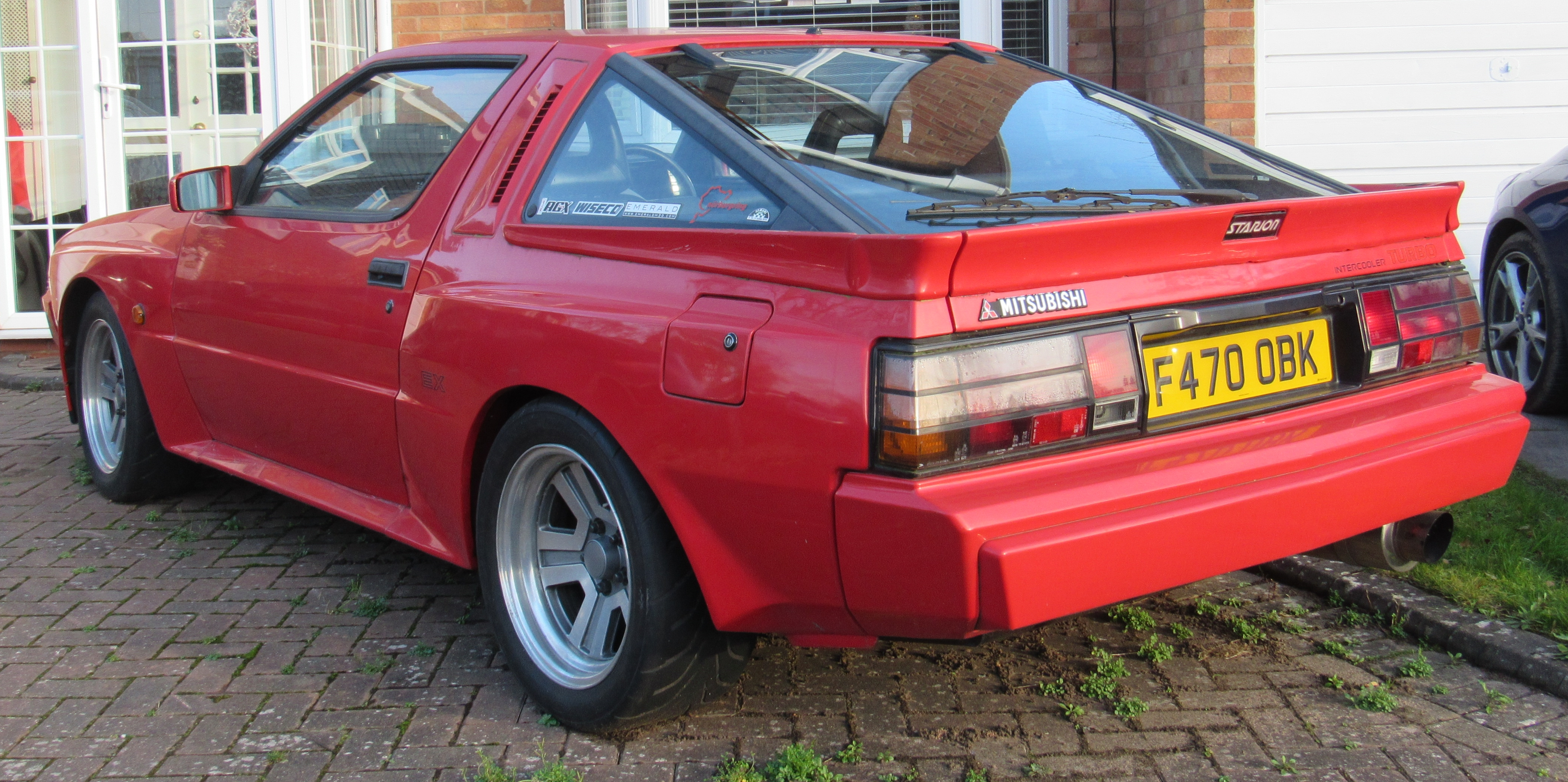
Rear view of wide-bodied Starion (1988; UK)

A number of models existed throughout the world during 1982 to 1989.

=== Japan ===
2.0 L G63B engine, apart from GSR-VR which has 2.6 L G54B.

The Japanese domestic market had a large range of Starions to choose from.

- GX - 1982–1983 - live rear axle, non-turbo 110 PS (81 kW; 108 hp) engine
- GSR-I, GSR-II, GSR-III, GSR-X - 1982–1984 - turbocharged, the earliest models were non-intercooled (145 PS (107 kW; 143 hp)). Intercooler versions had 175 PS (129 kW; 173 hp)
- GSR-II, GSR-III, GSR-X - 1984–1987 - mid-life refresh, can be distinguished from the earlier Starions by large fog lights in the front bumper
- GSR-V - 1984–1987 - all equipped with 12-valve Sirius DASH engine (200 PS (147 kW; 197 hp)) and 5-bolt wheels
- GSR-VR - 1987–1989 - widebody, equipped with the 2.6 L Astron engine (175 PS (129 kW; 173 hp)). A small number of widebodies (approx. 73) were produced with the Sirius DASH as a limited-edition model known as 2000GSR-VR

The Roman numeral after 'GSR' denotes the vehicle specification. Some examples can be found below:

- GSR-I - base model
- GSR-II - power steering and electric windows, optional digital dash cluster and trip computer
- GSR-III - improved audio system, trip computer system, digital dash cluster, and air conditioning.
- GSR-X - leather interior replaced the cloth, climate control, air conditioning, cruise control

=== Australia ===
2.0 L G63B engine.

Australian vehicles were mostly similar to the European Turbo specification. The J codes below denote the model version, and are found on the Australian Vehicle Information Plates.

- JA - 1982–1984
- JB - 1984–1985
- JD - 1985–1987

=== North America ===
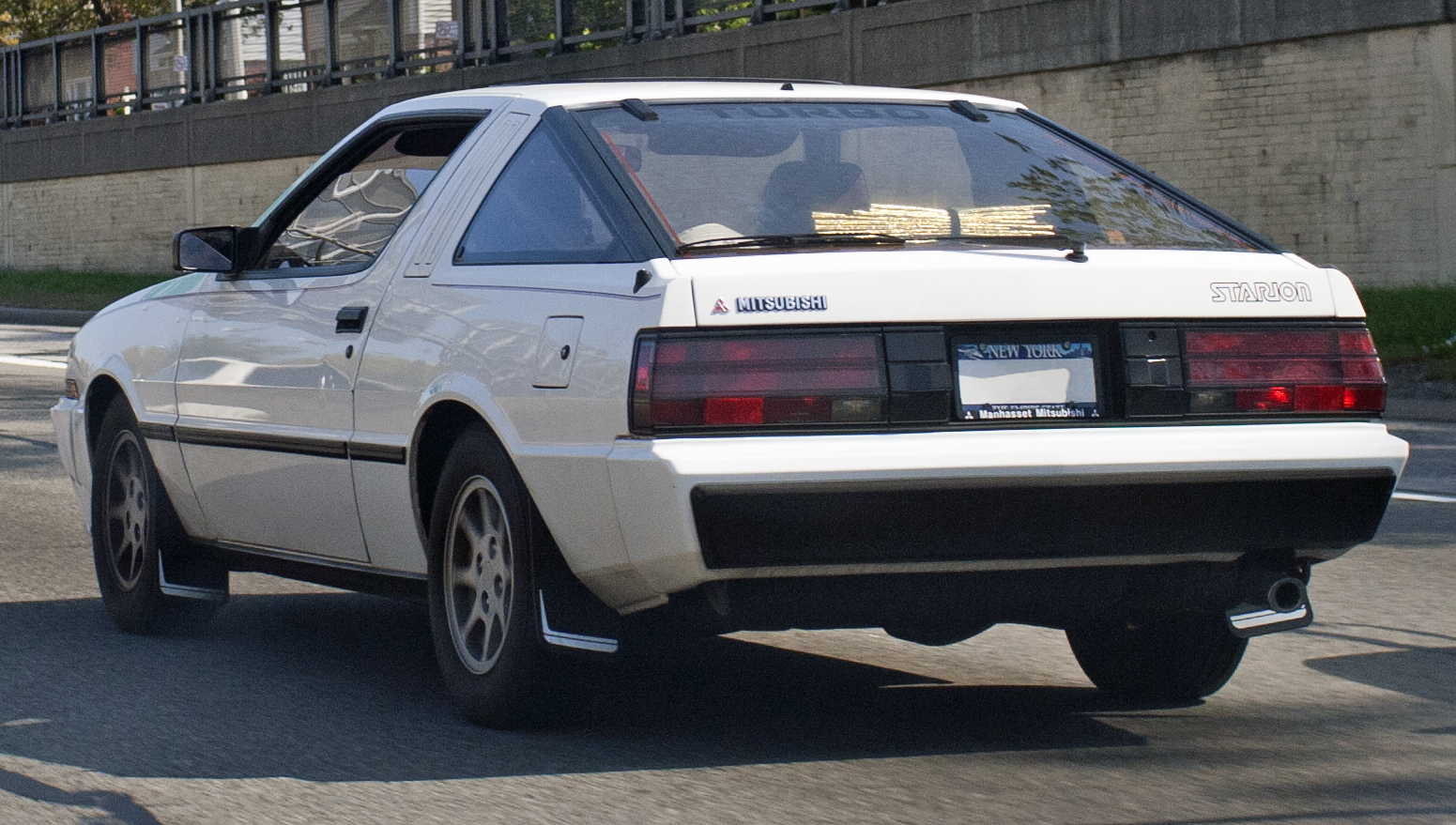
Early, narrow-bodied US market Starion

It was marketed in North America by Mitsubishi as the Starion from 1983 until 1989. It was also sold as a captive import by Chrysler as the Conquest, under both the Dodge and Plymouth names from 1984 until 1986 and only under the Chrysler name from 1987 until 1989. For model year 1987, Mitsubishi introduced a passive restraint system for front occupants which featured automatic shoulder belts. The safety feature remained through the final 1989 model year.

The Conquest used the 2.6 L G54B engine with TD05-12A MHI (Mitsubishi Heavy Industries) turbocharger. The TD05-12A (Mitsubishi Heavy Industries) turbocharger was also fitted to the earlier, non-intercooled narrow-body models, producing 145 hp (108 kW).

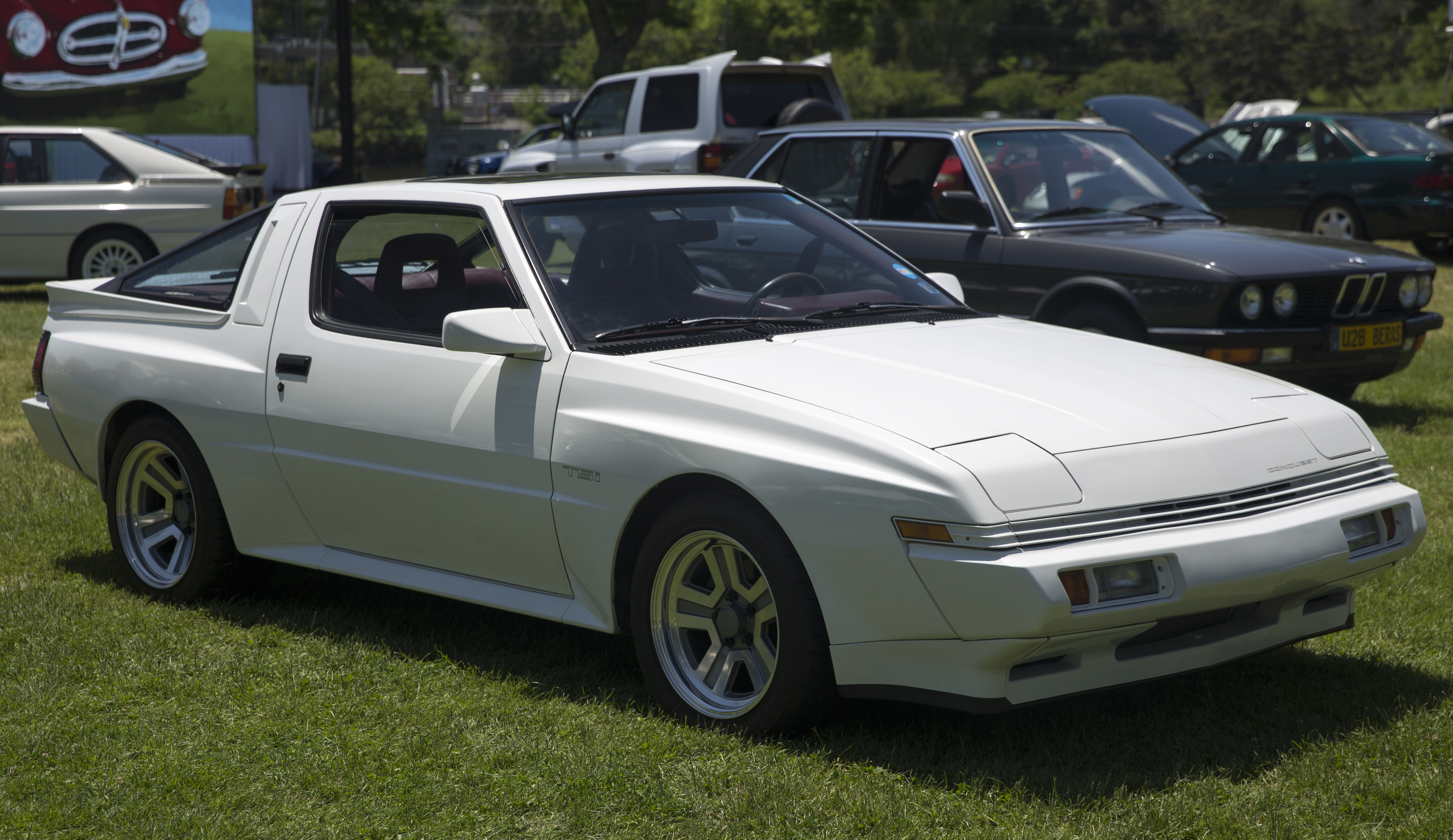
Chrysler Conquest

Mitsubishi

- Base - 1983
- LS - 1983-85
- LE - 1984-87
- ES - 1984-85
- ESI - 1985.5-1988, intercooled
- ESI-R - 1986-89 widebody, intercooled

Chrysler/Dodge/Plymouth

- LE
- TSi - 1986-89 widebody, intercooled
- Technica - 1985-87 narrow body with digital dash cluster

Verified by ** MCA-Chrysler Motorsports of America (10/01).

=== Europe ===
2.0 L G63B engine with MHI TC06-11A turbocharger, apart from GSR-VR which has 2.6 L G54B engine with TC05-12A turbocharger.

- EX II - narrowbody with intercooler
- EX - luxury version
- Turbo - base model

With the exception of Australia, many models were available as either narrow-body or wide-body shell styles.

== Motorsports ==
The Starion was a prominent competitor in motorsports up to International level during the 1980s and performed well on the circuit in Group A and Group N races of the era. Andy McLennan driving a Simmons Drums sponsored Starion was very successful, picking up many race wins and a Monroe championship, this against the semi works car of Colin Blower. In the Netherlands, John Hugenholtz won the over 2L class in the Dutch Championship, with the Colin Blower-prepared Mitsubishi Dealers car. In the United States, the Starion became best known for successes in endurance racing at several SCCA sanctioned events, and in Japan at the Japanese Touring Car Championship. Starions from Dave Wolin's Team Mitsubishi, with turbocharged 2.6 L G54B engines built by noted Lotus engine guru Dave Vegher, captured the prestigious "Longest Day of Nelson Ledges" 24-hour endurance race four years running from 1984 through 1987. Team Mitsubishi Starions also won the Sports Car Club of America (SCCA) U.S. Endurance Championships three of those four years, competing against the fully factory-backed (Wolin's team was only partially sponsored by Mitsubishi) efforts from Chrysler, Audi, Nissan and Mazda. Although not commonly seen in modern motorsports, a number are still raced on both circuit and in special stage rally events, usually by privateers.

=== Starion 4WD ===
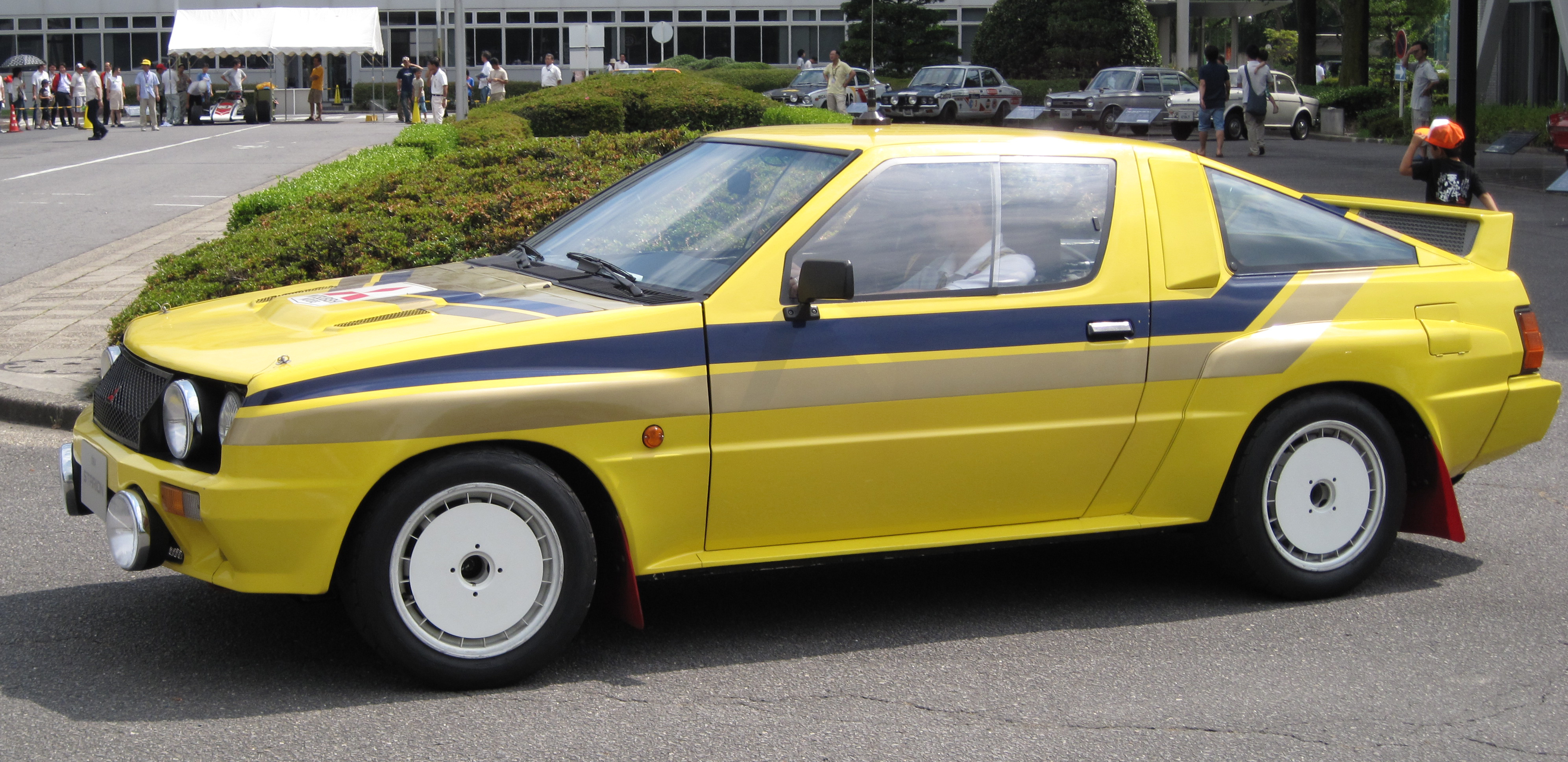
The Starion 4WD was never fully developed, due to the cancellation of Group B

The Starion was not very successful off-road, but found victory in Group A World Rally Championships and Asia Pacific Rally Championships during 1987 and 1988. An all wheel drive version of the Starion was also produced for Group B specifications (one of the few Japanese automobile manufacturers to enter this class), but after an encouraging start as a prototype, it was not homologated before the FIA banned Group B cars for safety reasons. The Starion was converted to all wheel drive by adding a strengthened transfer case from a Pajero behind the transmission. This configuration allowed the engine to be situated well back in the chassis, for improved front/rear weight distribution compared to the Audi Quattro, whose configuration required the engine to be far forward in the car. Although the wheelbase did not change, the use of regular headlights rather than the production model's pop-up headlights allowed the nose to be six inches shorter, as well as saving several pounds in weight. Further weight was saved by the use of carbon fiber for the driveshafts, sumpguard, and lower arms of the suspension, and fiberglass for the hood (bonnet), tailgate, door skins, fenders, bumpers and spoilers, resulting in a final weight of less than 1,000 kg (2,200 lb), lighter than the Audi Quattro. The car was developed with a turbocharged and intercooled version of Mitsubishi's 2.0 L fuel injected engine, but the final goal was to use a turbocharged and intercooled 261 kW (355 PS; 350 hp) version of the Sirius Dash engine that Mitsubishi announced at the 1983 Tokyo Motor Show, which switched electronically at 2500 rpm from one inlet valve per cylinder to two. The car was campaigned for Mitsubishi by Team Ralliart in Essex, Great Britain, under rally veteran Andrew Cowan and engineer Alan Wilkinson, who had developed the Audi Quattro for Audi Sport UK.

=== Major results circuit ===
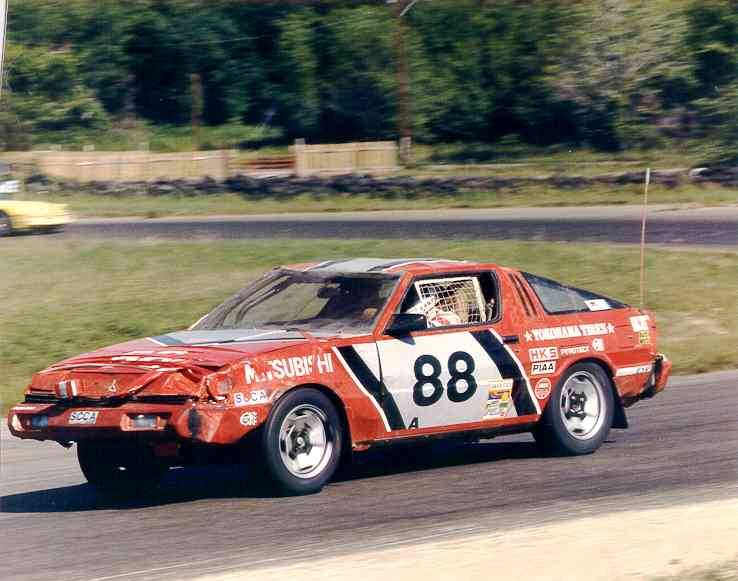
Team Mitsubishi Starion winning the 1985 Longest Day of Nelson Ledges, 24-hour race, despite heavy rollover crash damage (Note the chicken wire "windshield").

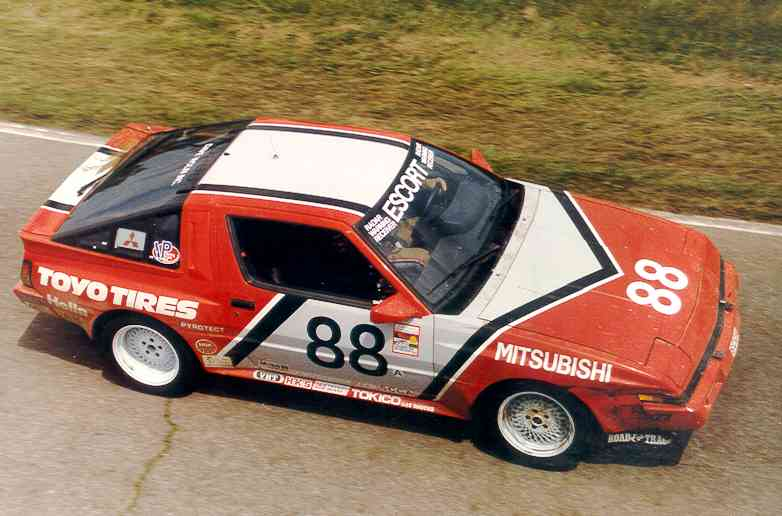
1987 Escort Endurance Series Championship-winning Team Mitsubishi Starion ESI-R.

==== International ====
- 1984 SCCA Nelson Ledges 24 Hour Race 1st
- 1984 SCCA Playboy Endurance Championship 1st
- 1984 Silverstone Finale 1st
- 1984 Australian Super Series 1st and 2nd outright - Peter Fitzgerald and Brad Jones
- 1985 British Saloon Car Championship 2nd in championship
- 1985 James Hardie 1000 9th outright, 2nd in class - Kevin Bartlett and Peter McKay
- 1985 Australian Manufacturers' Championship 7th
- 1985 Guia Race in Macau Grand Prix 3rd
- 1985 Guia Race in Macau Grand Prix 4th
- 1985 SCCA Nelson Ledges 24 Hour Race 1st, Despite heavy rollover crash damage.
- 1985 SCCA Playboy Endurance Championship 1st
- 1986 SCCA Escort Endurance Championship 2nd
- 1986 SCCA Nelson Ledges 24 Hour Race 1st
- 1986 SCCA Showroom Stock A National Championship 1st
- 1986 Winton 300 Group E Series Production cars 1st Des Gibbs and Denis O'Brien [Starions filled top 6 positions]
- 1986 Dutch National Touring Car Championship 1st
- 1987 SCCA/Escort Endurance Championship 1st
- 1987 SCCA Nelson Ledges 24 Hour Race 1st
- 1987 Australian Production Car Championship - 1st - Peter Fitzgerald
- 1987 James Hardie 1000 5th outright - Gary Scott and Akihiko Nakaya
- 1988 SCCA Showroom Stock A National Championship 1st
- 1988 Australian Manufacturers' Championship 8th
- 1988 Oran Park 250 3rd outright - Gary Scott and Terry Shiel
- 1988 Tooheys 1000 10th outright - Terry Shiel and Brad Jones
- 1990 SCCA Showroom Stock A National Championship 1st

==== Japan ====
- 1985 Inter TEC (Japanese Touring Car Championship (JTC)) 4th
- 1986 SUGO Group A 300 km Race (JTC) 3rd
- 1986 Race de Nippon Tsukuba (JTC) 1st
- 1986 Suzaka 300 km Race (JTC) 2nd
- 1986 All Japan Touring Car Championship 2nd in championship
- 1987 All Japan Touring Car Race (JTC) 1st
- 1987 GHiland Touring Car 300 km Race (JTC) 1st
- 1987 All Japan Touring Car Championship 3rd in championship
- 1988 Hiland Touring Car 300 km Race (JTC) 2nd

=== Major results rally ===
Starion 4WD (1984–1986)

- 1983 Paris-Dakar Rally 1st in Experimental Class
- 1984 Milles Piste Rally (French Rally Championship) 1st in Prototype Category
- 1986 Hong Kong-Beijing Rally 2nd
- 1987 Qatar Rally (Middle East Rally, Rallye Côte d'Ivoire (World Rally Championship) 4th
- 1987 Himalayan Rally 1st
- 1987 Oman Rally (Middle East Rally Championship) 3rd
- 1988 Scottish Rally (British Rally Championship)
- 1988 British Open Rally Championship (CARTEL International Rally) 1st (Pentti Airikkala/Ronan McNamee)
