= Lamborghini Diablo =

Sports car produced by Lamborghini

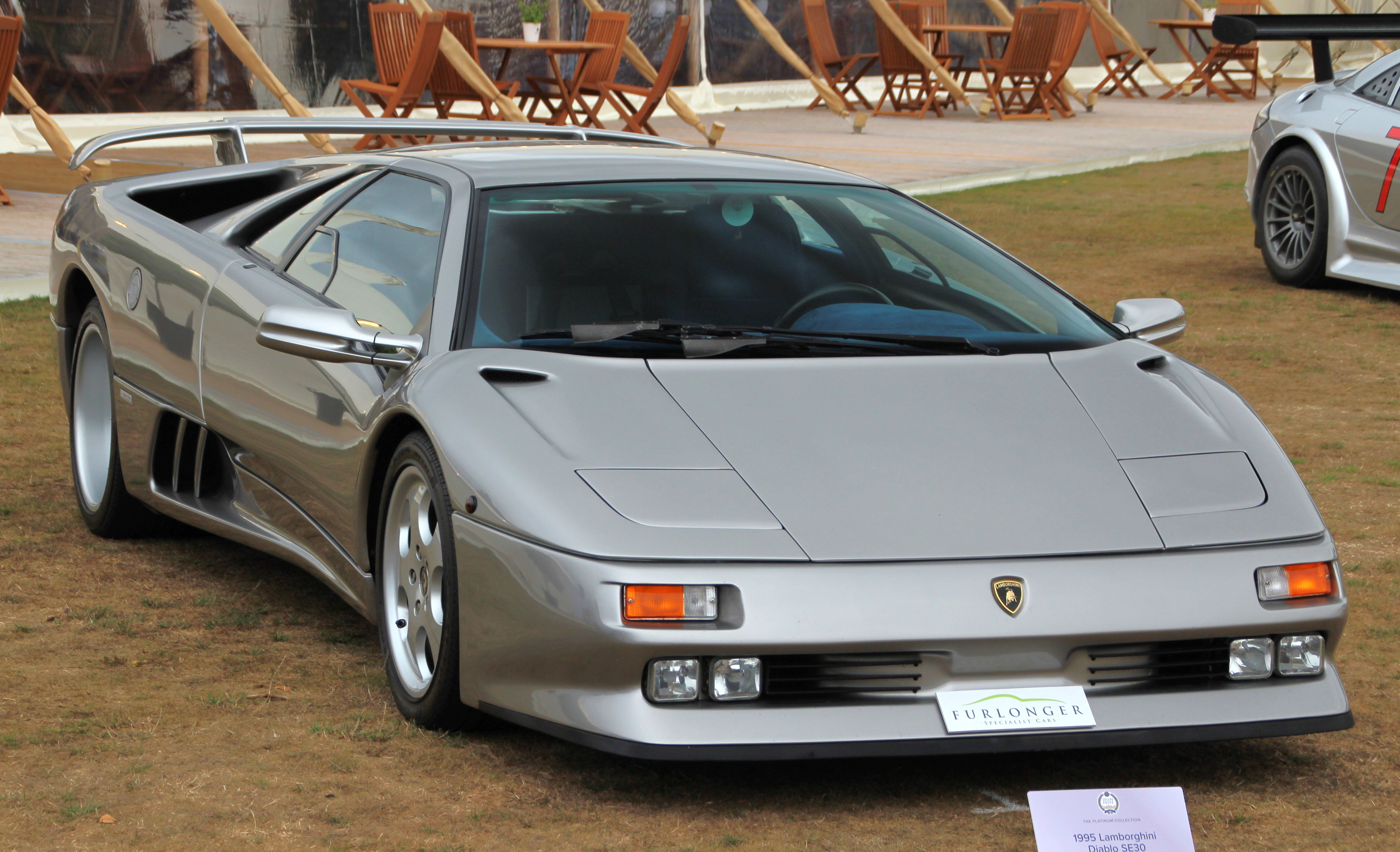
- Lamborghini Diablo SE30

Overview
- Manufacturer: Lamborghini
- Production: 1990–2001; 2,903 built
- Assembly: Italy: Sant'Agata Bolognese
- Designer: Marcello Gandini (initial design); Tom Gale at Chrysler Styling Center (final design); Luc Donckerwolke (Diablo VT 6.0)

Body and chassis
- Class: Sports car (S)
- Body style: 2-door coupé 2-door retractable hard-top convertible (roadster)
- Layout: Longitudinal, Mid-engine, rear-wheel drive / all-wheel drive
- Doors: Scissor
- Related: Vector M12

Powertrain
- Engine: 5.7–6.0 L Lamborghini V12
- Transmission: 5-speed manual

Dimensions
- Wheelbase: 2,650 mm (104.3 in)
- Length: 4,460 mm (175.6 in)–4,470 mm (176.0 in)
- Width: 2,040 mm (80.3 in)
- Height: 1,105 mm (43.5 in)–1,115 mm (43.9 in)
- Curb weight: 1,576 kg (3,474 lb) (Diablo); 1,625 kg (3,583 lb) (Diablo VT); 1,625 kg (3,583 lb) (Diablo VT Roadster); 1,430 kg (3,153 lb) (Diablo SE30); 1,530 kg (3,370 lb) (Diablo SV); 1,385 kg (3,053 lb) (Diablo SV-R); 1,460 kg (3,219 lb) (Diablo GT); 1,395 kg (3,075 lb) (Diablo GT-R); 1,656 kg (3,651 lb) (Diablo 6.0 VT)

Chronology
- Predecessor: Lamborghini Countach
- Successor: Lamborghini Murciélago

The Lamborghini Diablo (meaning "devil" in Spanish), is a series of high-performance V12, longitudinal, mid-engined sports cars in the supercar market segment, built by Italian automobile manufacturer Lamborghini from 1990 through 2001. It is the first production Lamborghini with a top speed in excess of 200 mph (322 km/h).

In 1993, the Diablo VT (for 'Viscous Traction') became Lamborghini's first all-wheel drive production sportscar. The car retained its rear-wheel drive character, but a computer-modulated system could direct up to 25% of the engine's torque to the front wheels in case of rear-axle slip, to improve the car's handling. In 1995, Lamborghini also began building their first open-top V12, in the form of a Diablo roadster. During the later years, a number of special editions were built, typically in very small numbers.

After the end of its production run in 2001, the Diablo was replaced by the Murciélago.

== History of development ==
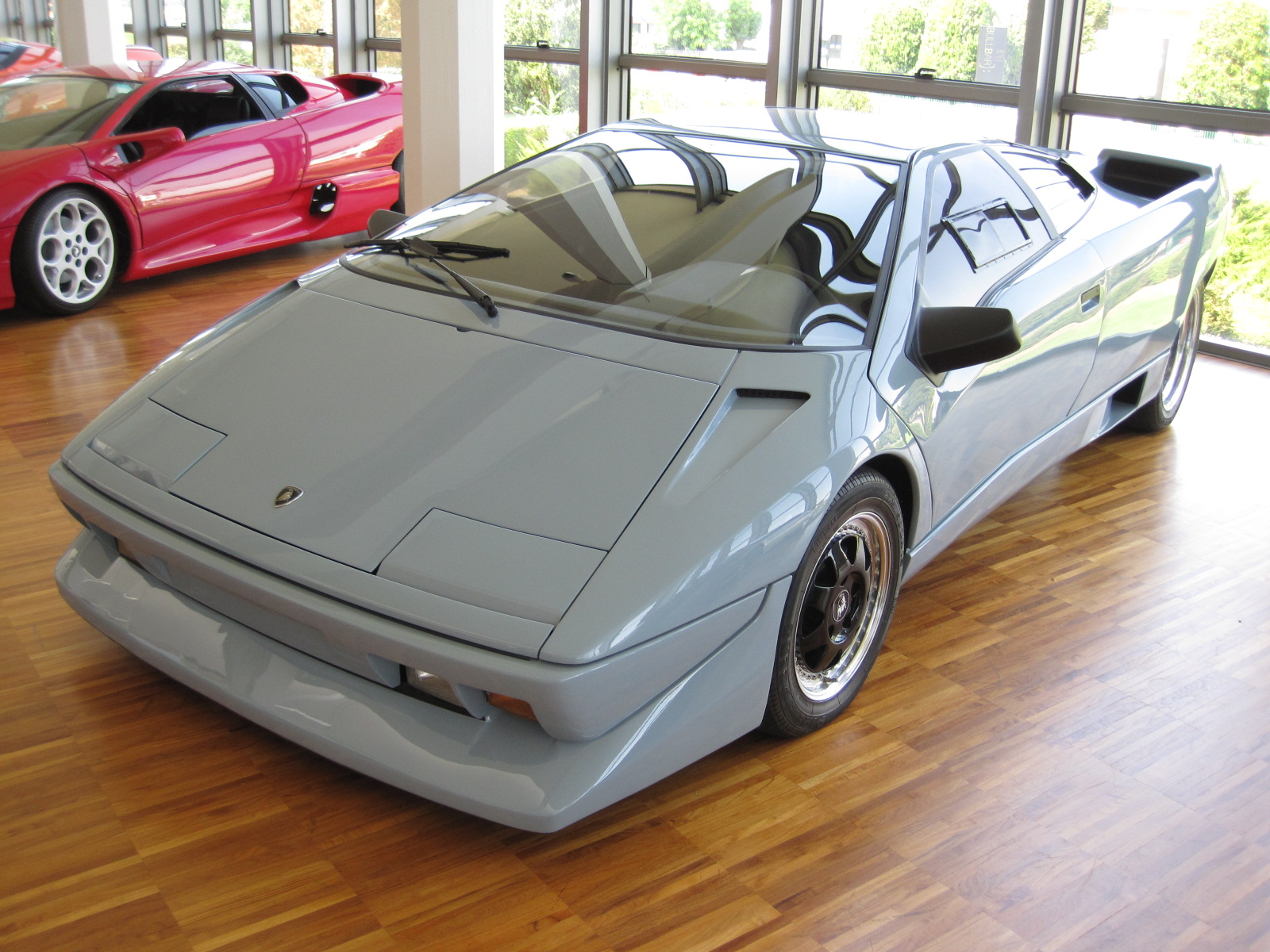
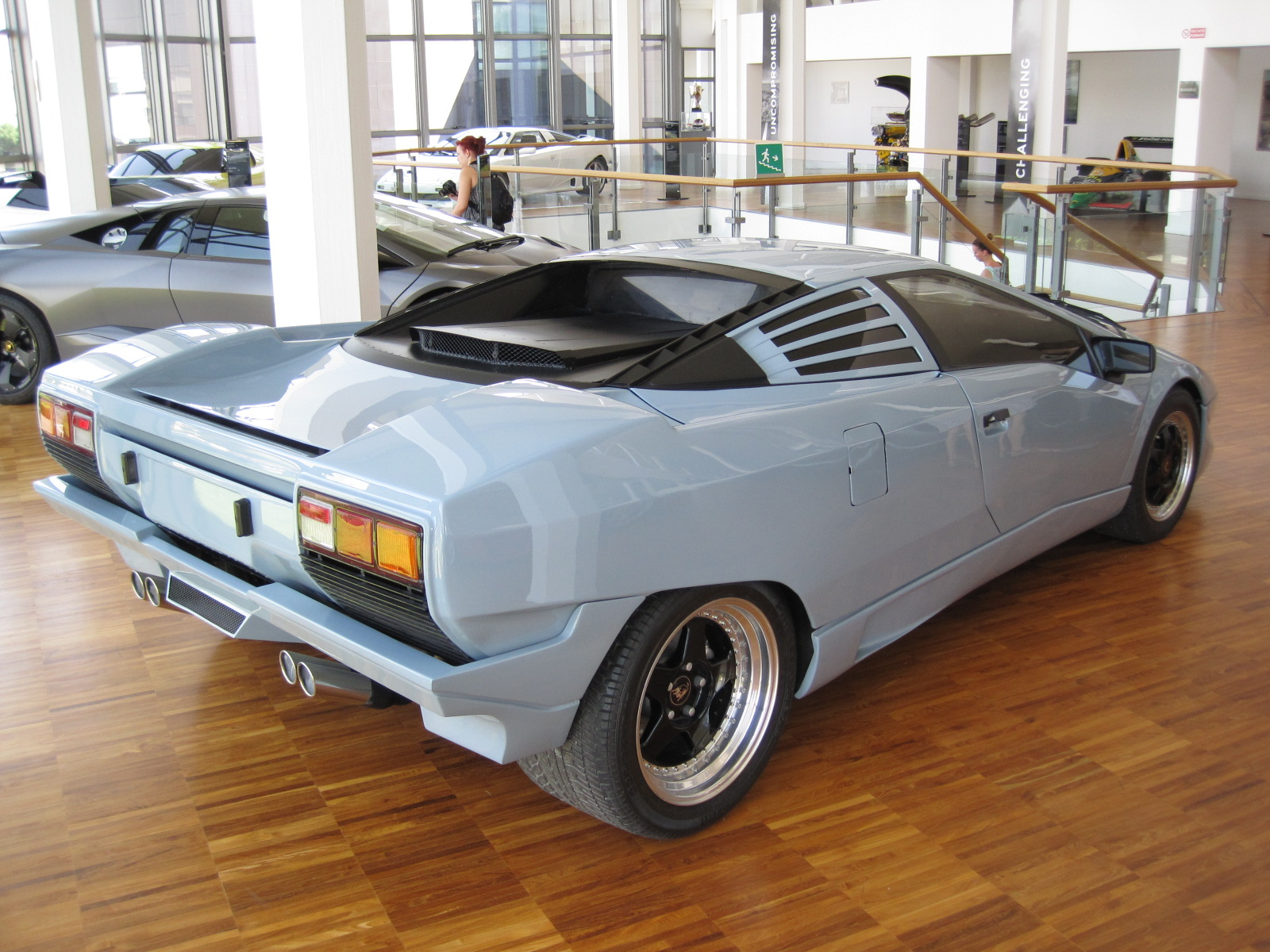
The Lamborghini P132 prototype designed by Marcello Gandini on display at the Lamborghini museum, a design which would later be used for the Cizeta-Moroder V16T

At a time when the company was financed by the Swiss-based brothers Jean Claude and Patrick Mimran, Lamborghini began development of what was codenamed Project 132 in June 1985 as a replacement for the Countach, Lamborghini's then flagship sports car. The brief stated that the top speed of the new car had to be at least 315 km/h (196 mph).

The design of the car was contracted to Marcello Gandini, who had designed its two predecessors. When Chrysler Corporation bought the company in 1987, funding the company to complete the car's development, its management was displeased with Gandini's designs and commissioned its design team in Detroit to execute a third extensive redesign, smoothing out the infamous sharp edges and corners of Gandini's original design. Gandini would later realise his original design in the Cizeta-Moroder V16T.

The new car was named Diablo, carrying on Lamborghini's tradition of naming its cars after breeds of fighting bulls. The Diablo was named after a ferocious bull raised by the Duke of Veragua in the 19th century, famous for fighting an epic battle with 'El Chicorro' in Madrid on 11 July 1869.

The development is believed to have cost a total of 6 billion Lire.

== Original (1990–1998) ==
=== Diablo ===
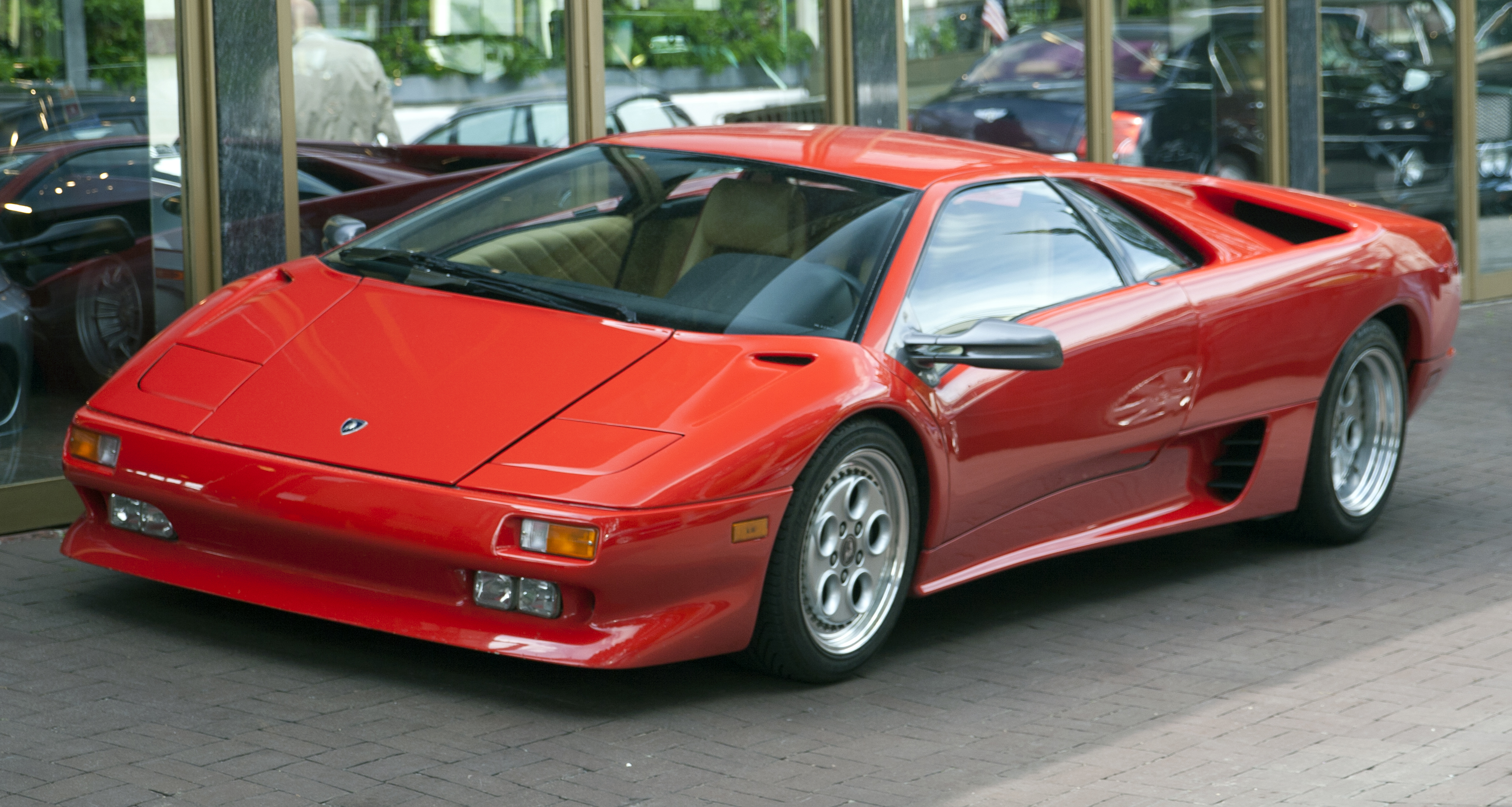
The original Diablo

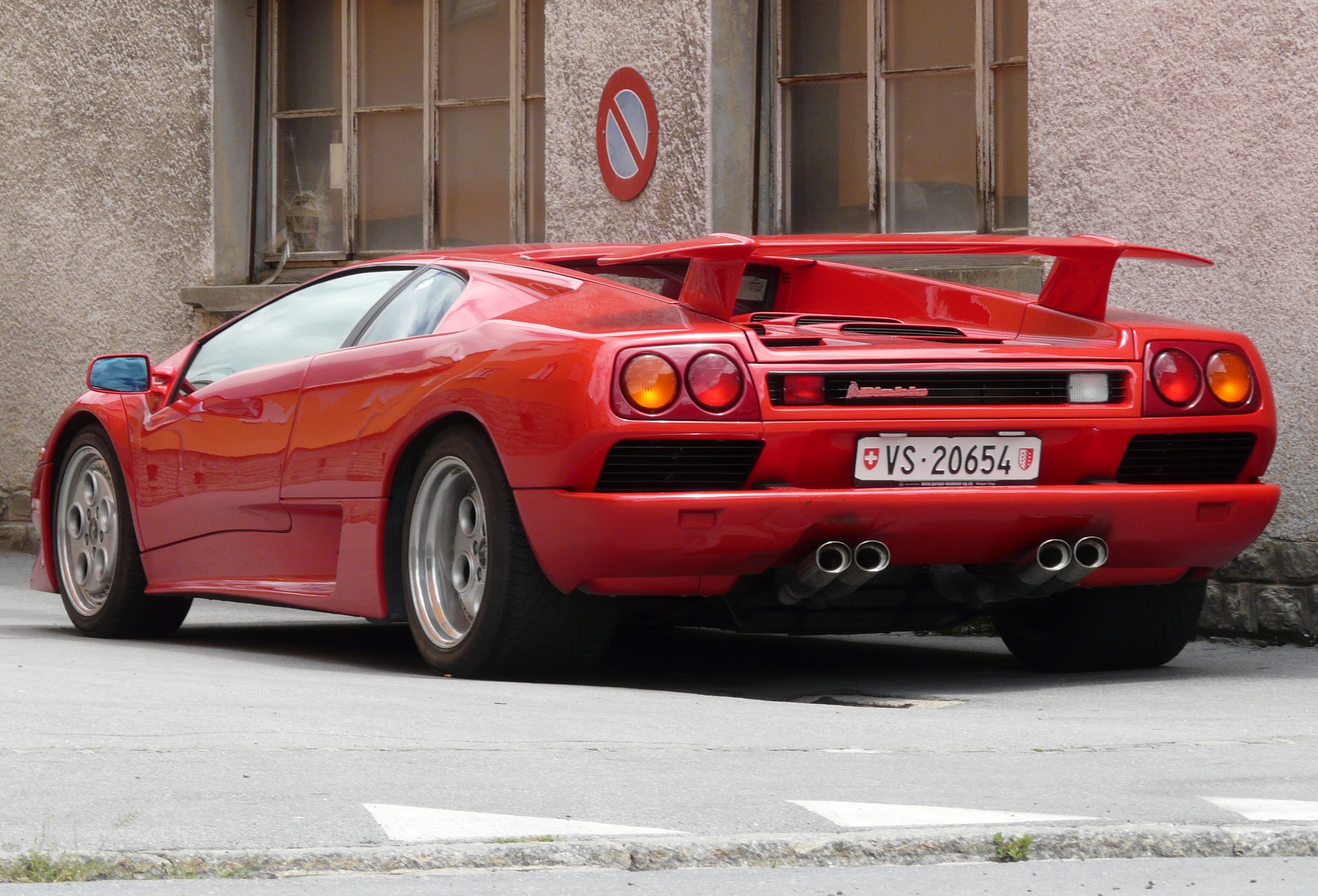
Rear of the car showing the optional rear wing

The Diablo was presented to the public for sale on 21 January 1990. Its power came from a 5.7 L (348 cu in) dual overhead cam, 4 valves per cylinder version of the existing V12 engine and computer-controlled multi-point fuel injection, producing a maximum output of 492 PS (362 kW; 485 hp) and 580 N⋅m (428 lbf⋅ft) of torque to reach a top speed of 325 km/h (202 mph). The Diablo was rear-wheel drive and the engine was mid-mounted to aid its weight balance. Auto Motor und Sport measured 0-100 km/h (62 mph) in 4.5 seconds, 0-160 km/h (99 mph) in 9.3 seconds and 0-200 km/h (124 mph) in 13.7 seconds.

Breguet for Diablo clock

The Diablo came better equipped than the Countach; standard features included fully adjustable seats and steering wheel, electric windows, an Alpine stereo system, and power steering from 1993 onwards. Anti-lock brakes were not initially available, although they would eventually be used. A few options were available, including a custom-molded driver's seat, remote CD changer and subwoofer, rear spoiler, factory fitted luggage set (priced at $2,600) and an exclusive Breguet clock for the dash (priced at $10,500). It is estimated less than 50 units of the Breguet for Diablo clock were made.

=== Diablo Roadster Concept ===
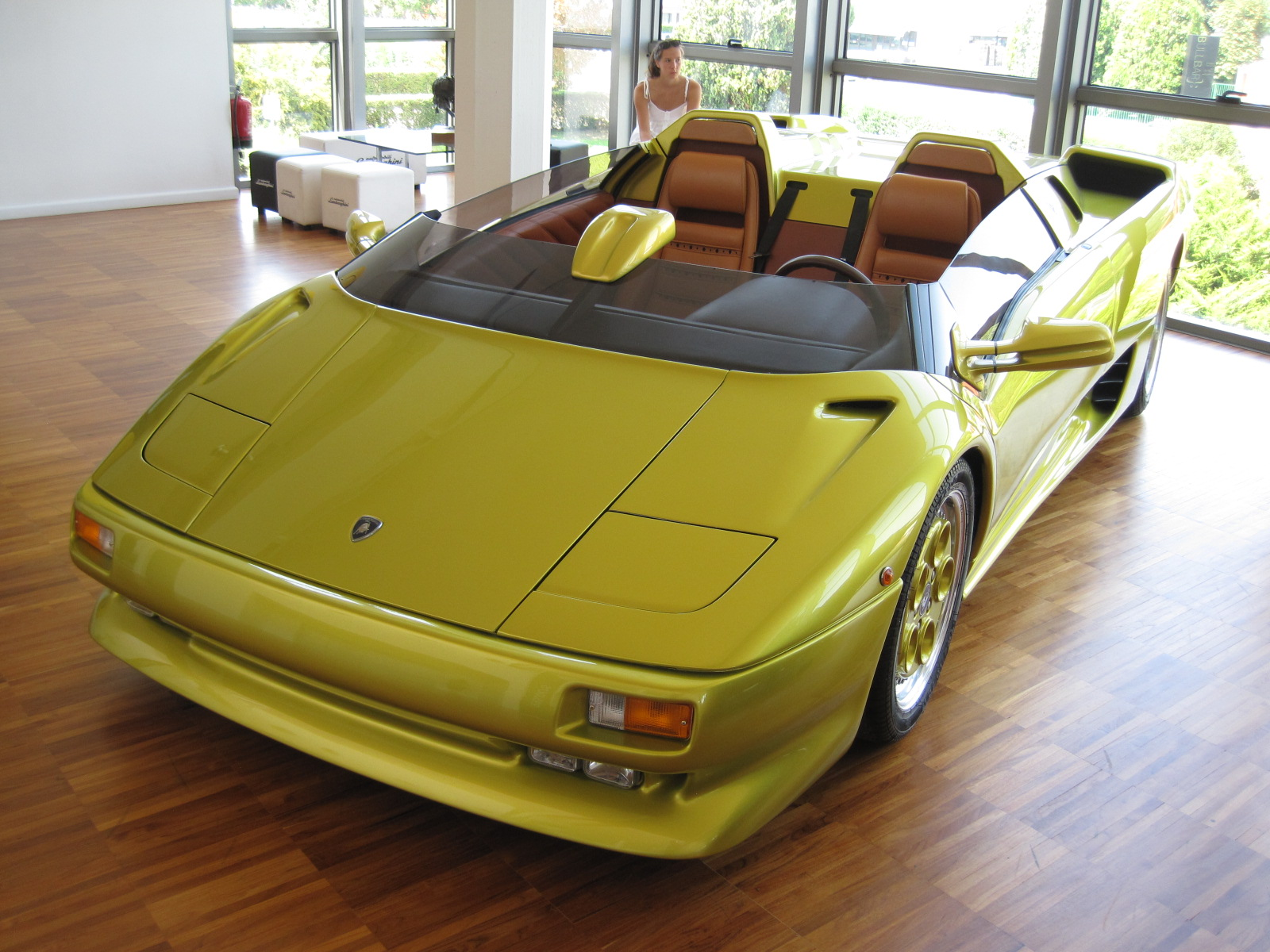
1992 Lamborghini Diablo Roadster concept, a car from which many design features were carried out to the Lamborghini Diablo VT and the VT Roadster

Introduced at the 1992 Geneva Motor Show, the Diablo roadster concept showcased what a possible open top version of the car would look like. The roof was removed and the car had a shortened visor in place of the windshield which made its way to the doors indicating the adaptation of the barchetta body style. The chassis was strengthened in order to compensate for the loss of the roof and the car featured many unique components some of which made their way to the later variants of the Diablo. Such components included larger air intakes near the rear wing and the sides of the car for better engine cooling, a visor mounted rear view mirror, roll bars over the seats, unique wheels in body colour of the car and a unique engine cover which included a tunnel in the middle for better airflow over the rear view mirror. The signature scissor doors were retained despite the loss of the roof and the interior became more ergonomic and featured a unique two-tone beige colour. The concept generated a positive response among the public and demand among customers for such a car. As the car was not intended for production, German tuner Koenig Specials, with Lamborghini's permission, converted customer cars into replicas of the concept. The cars featured different front and rear bumpers along with wheels than that of the concept due to copyright issues along with an upgraded engine. The conversion was no longer offered upon the request of Lamborghini as the company introduced the Diablo VT roadster in 1995.

=== Diablo VT ===
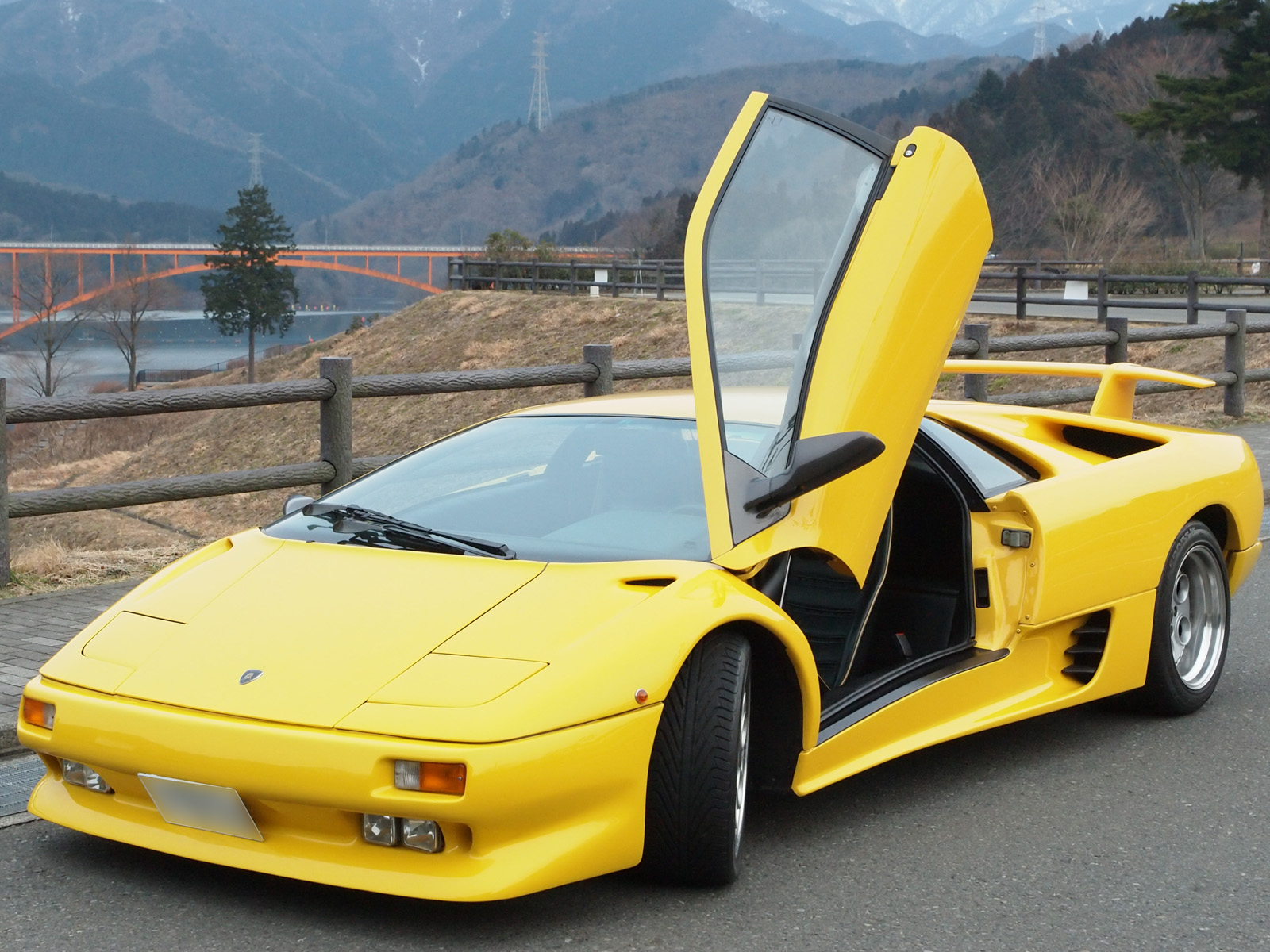
Diablo VT

The Diablo VT was introduced in 1993. Although the VT differed from the standard Diablo in a number of ways, by far the most notable change was the addition of all wheel drive, which made use of a viscous center differential (a modified version of LM002's 4WD system). This provided the new nomenclature for the car (VT stands for viscous traction). The new drivetrain could direct up to 25% of the torque to the front wheels to aid traction during rear wheel slip, thus significantly improving the handling characteristics of the car.

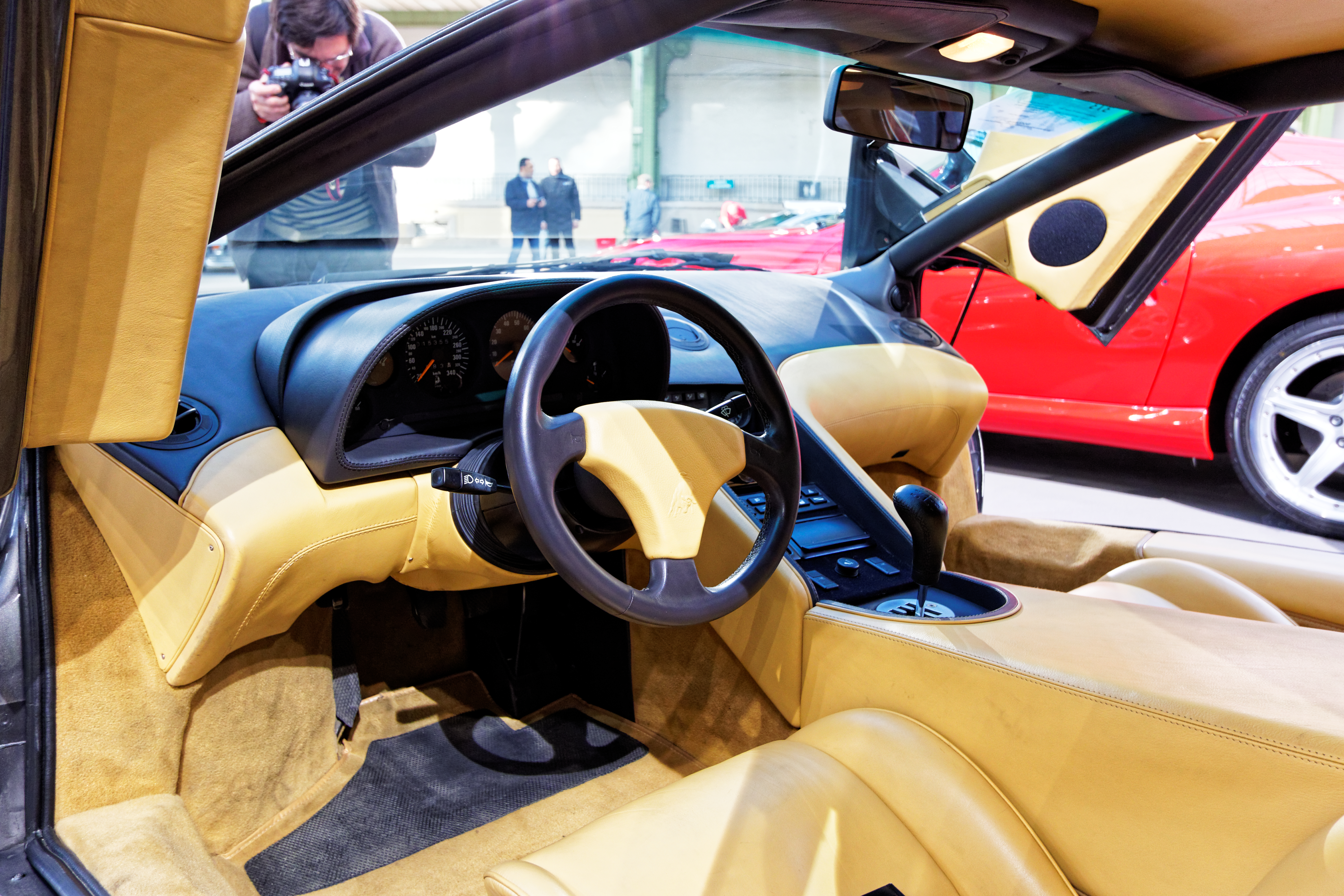
Interior. Note the indicator stalk from the Morris Marina.

Other improvements debuting on the VT included front air intakes below the driving lamps to improve brake cooling, larger intakes in the rear arches, a more ergonomic interior with revised electronically adjustable dampers, four-piston brake calipers, power steering and minor engine refinements. Many of these improvements, save for the four-wheel drive system, filtered down to the base Diablo, making the cars nearly identical visually.

=== Diablo SE30 and SE30 Jota ===
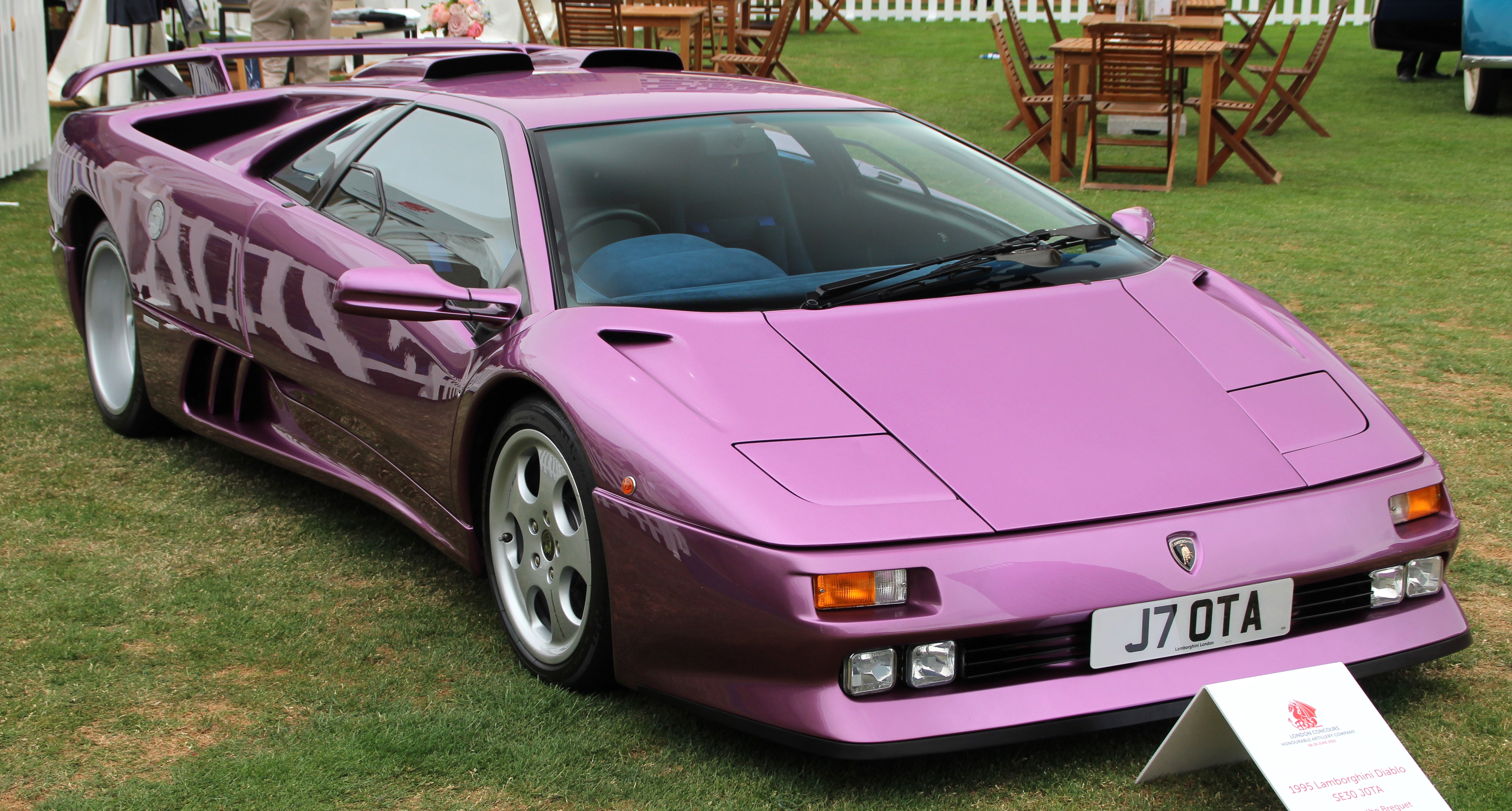
Diablo SE30 Jota

The Diablo SE30 was introduced in 1993 as a limited-production special model to commemorate the company's 30th anniversary. The engine received a boost to 525 PS (386 kW; 518 hp) by means of a tuned fuel system, free-flowing exhaust, and magnesium intake manifolds. The car remained rear-wheel drive to save weight, and omitted the electrically adjustable shock absorbers of the VT model, but was equipped with adjustable-stiffness anti-roll bars which could be controlled from the interior, on the fly.

The car's weight was lowered by replacing the power glass side windows with fixed plexiglas (with a small sliding vent window as on many race cars) and removing luxury features such as the air conditioning, stereo, and power steering. Carbon fibre seats with 4-point race harnesses and a fire suppression system added to the race nature of the vehicle.

On the outside, the SE30 differed from other Diablo models with a revised front fascia featuring straked brake cooling ducts and a deeper spoiler, while the rear cooling ducts were changed to a vertical body-colored design. The raging bull emblem was moved from the front of the luggage lid to the nose panel of the car between the front indicators. The engine lid had slats covering the narrow rear window, while a larger spoiler was installed as standard equipment. The single rear fog lamp and rear backup lamp, which had been on either side of the rear grille, were moved into the bumper; this change would be applied to all Diablo models across the lineup. Completing the exterior variations were special magnesium alloy wheels, SE30 badging, and a new metallic purple paint color (this could be changed upon request).

Only 150 SE30 models were built, and of these, about 15 were converted to "Jota" specification (although 28 Jota kits were produced). The "Jota" was a factory modification kit designed to convert the race-oriented SE30 into an actual circuit racer, albeit at the cost of street-legal operation. A revised engine lid with two ducts protruding above the roofline forced air into the intake system; a similar lid design would later be used on the Diablo SV model. With even more tuning of the Diablo's venerable V12 engine, it had a power output of 595 PS (438 kW; 587 hp) and 639 N⋅m (471 lb⋅ft) of torque. The rear-view mirror from the interior was also removed because it was completely useless in conjunction with the revised engine lid, further adding to the race feeling of the car.

=== Diablo SV ===
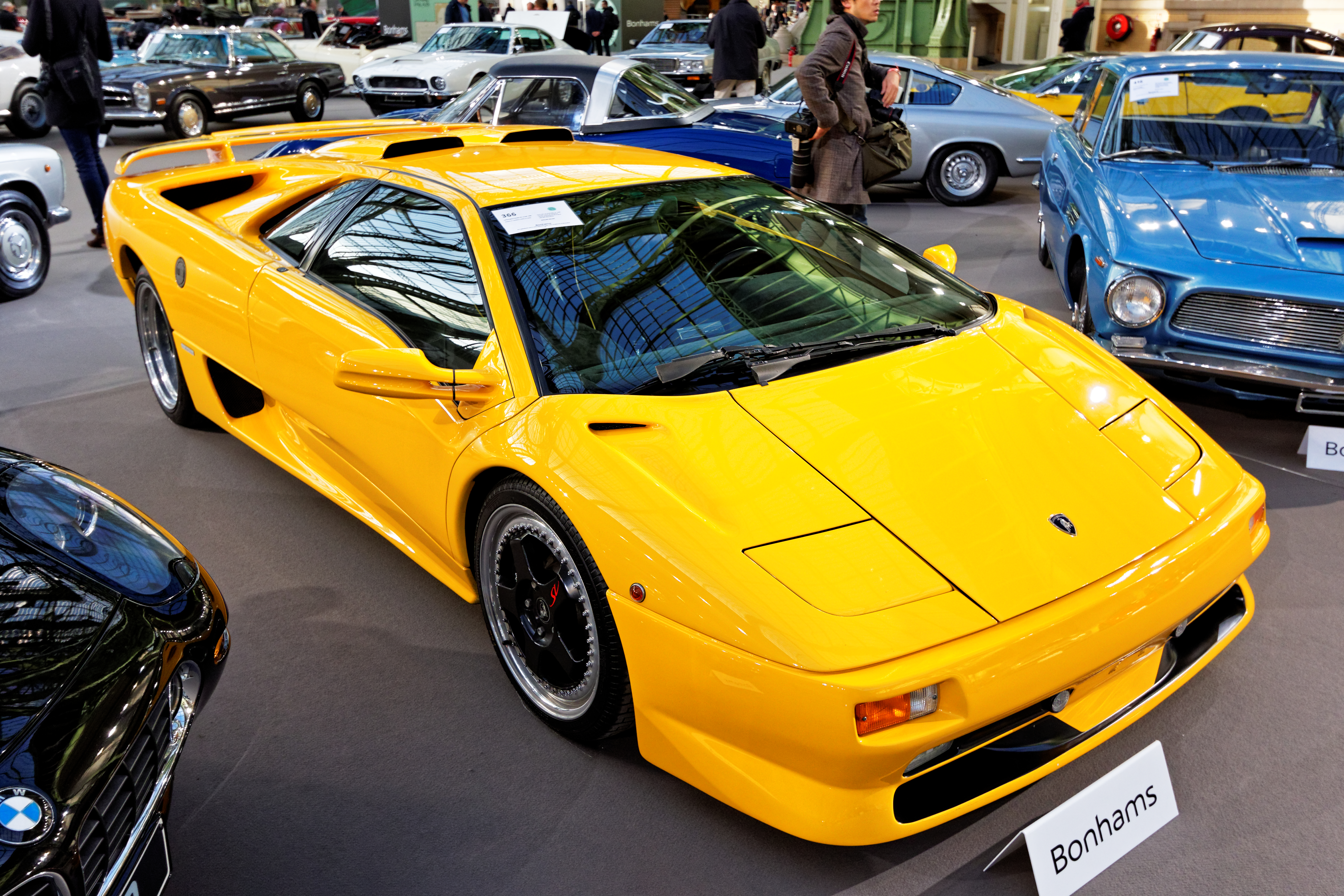
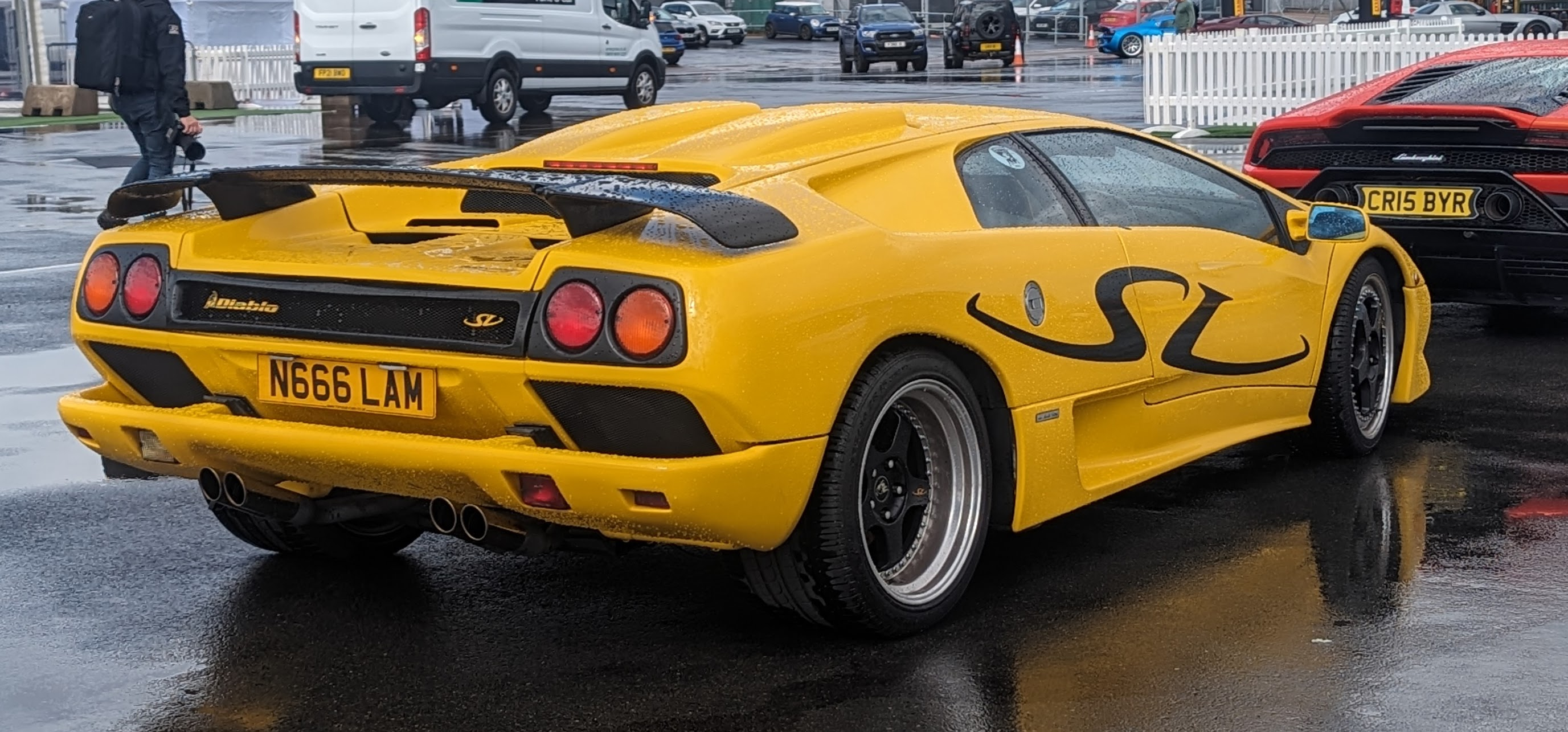
Diablo SV

The Diablo SV was introduced in 1995 at the Geneva Motor Show, reviving the SV moniker first used on the Miura SV. After Spinto Veloce on the Miura, the SV edition of the Diablo was short for Sport Veloce. Later, Lamborghini would revive the SV edition again on the Murciélago as the Super Veloce. The SV is based on the standard Diablo and thus lacks the four-wheel drive system of the VT. A notable feature of the SV is an increase in power output to 510 PS (375 kW; 503 hp) at 7,100 rpm and 580 N⋅m (428 lbf⋅ft) of torque at 5,900 rpm which, paired with the rear-wheel drive layout, can increase the likelihood of loss of traction during hard driving. Despite its higher power output, the SV was priced as the entry-level model in the Diablo range, falling below the standard Diablo by a small margin. An adjustable rear spoiler was installed as standard equipment and could be color-matched to the car body or formed from carbon fibre. Other exterior changes included black tail lamp surrounds, repositioned rear fog and reverse lamps as on the SE30, dual front fog lamps (rather than the quad style found on all previous models), an extra set of front brake cooling ducts, an engine lid similar to that installed on the Diablo SE30 Jota, and optional "SV" decals for the sides of the car. The SV also featured larger diameter front brakes (340 mm (13.4 in)) and a corresponding increase in front wheel size to 18 inches.

In 1998, a limited 20-car run of the Diablo SV was produced exclusively for the United States market and called the Monterey Edition. The most notable feature of this edition was the use of the SE30/VT Roadster style of air intakes in front of the rear wheels, unlike the traditional (and persisting) SV style. Several of the cars were painted in unusual, vibrant colours. One Monterey Edition, featuring an upgraded engine and brakes, was driven by Mario Andretti during the Lamborghini-sponsored "Running of the Bulls" event in California.

Need for Speed III: Hot Pursuit uses the Lamborghini Diablo SV as the cover car of the game. The Diablo became emblematic of the Need for Speed franchise, making several appearances throughout the later entries in the series.

=== Diablo VT Roadster ===
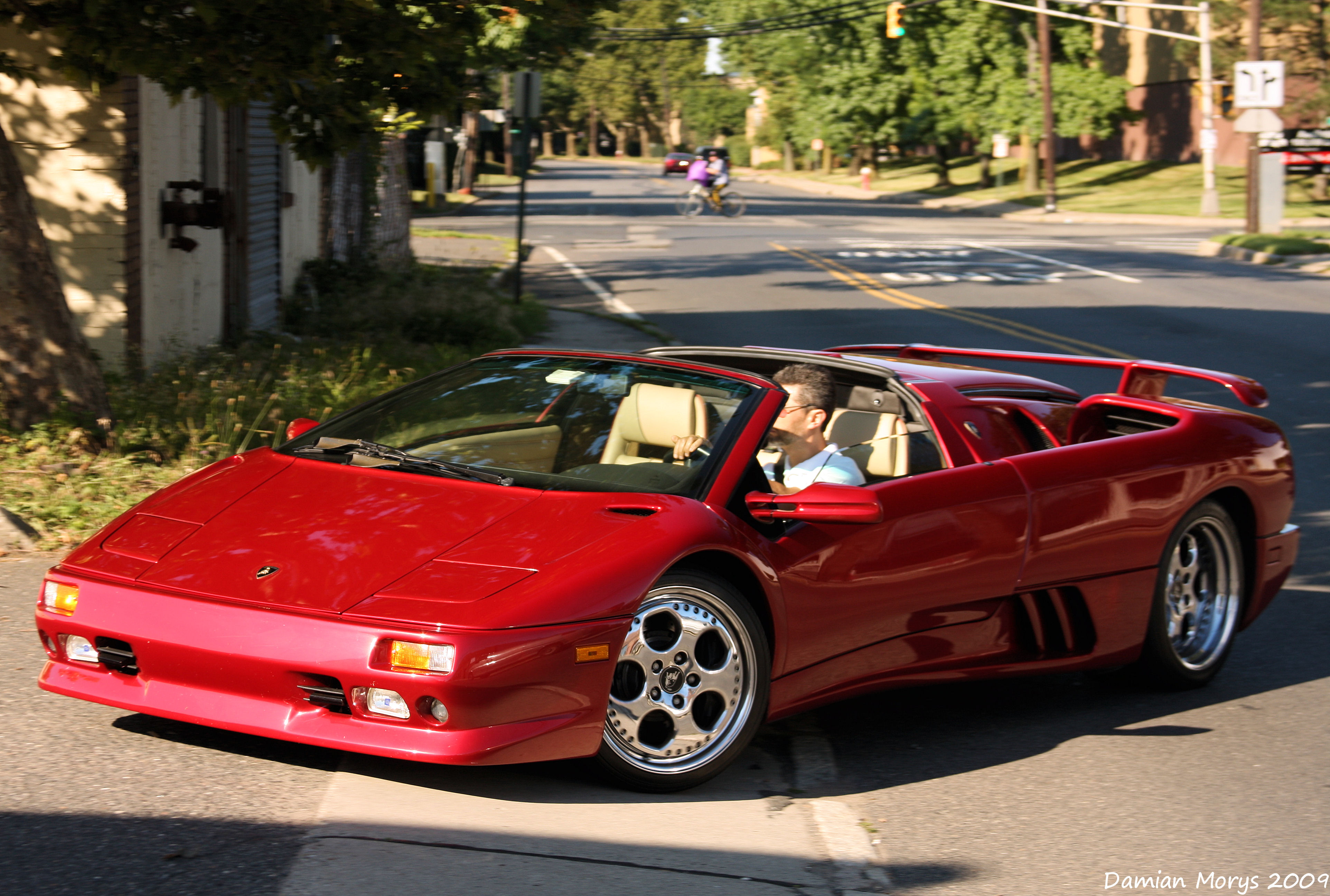
1995–1998 Diablo VT Roadster

The Diablo VT Roadster was introduced in December 1995 and featured a manually removable carbon fibre targa top which was stored above the engine lid when not in use. Besides the roof, the roadster's body was altered from the fixed-top VT model in a number of ways. The front bumper was revised, replacing the quad rectangular driving lamps with two rectangular and two round units. The brake cooling ducts were moved inboard of the driving lamps and changed to a straked design, while the rear ducts featured the vertical painted design seen on the SE30.

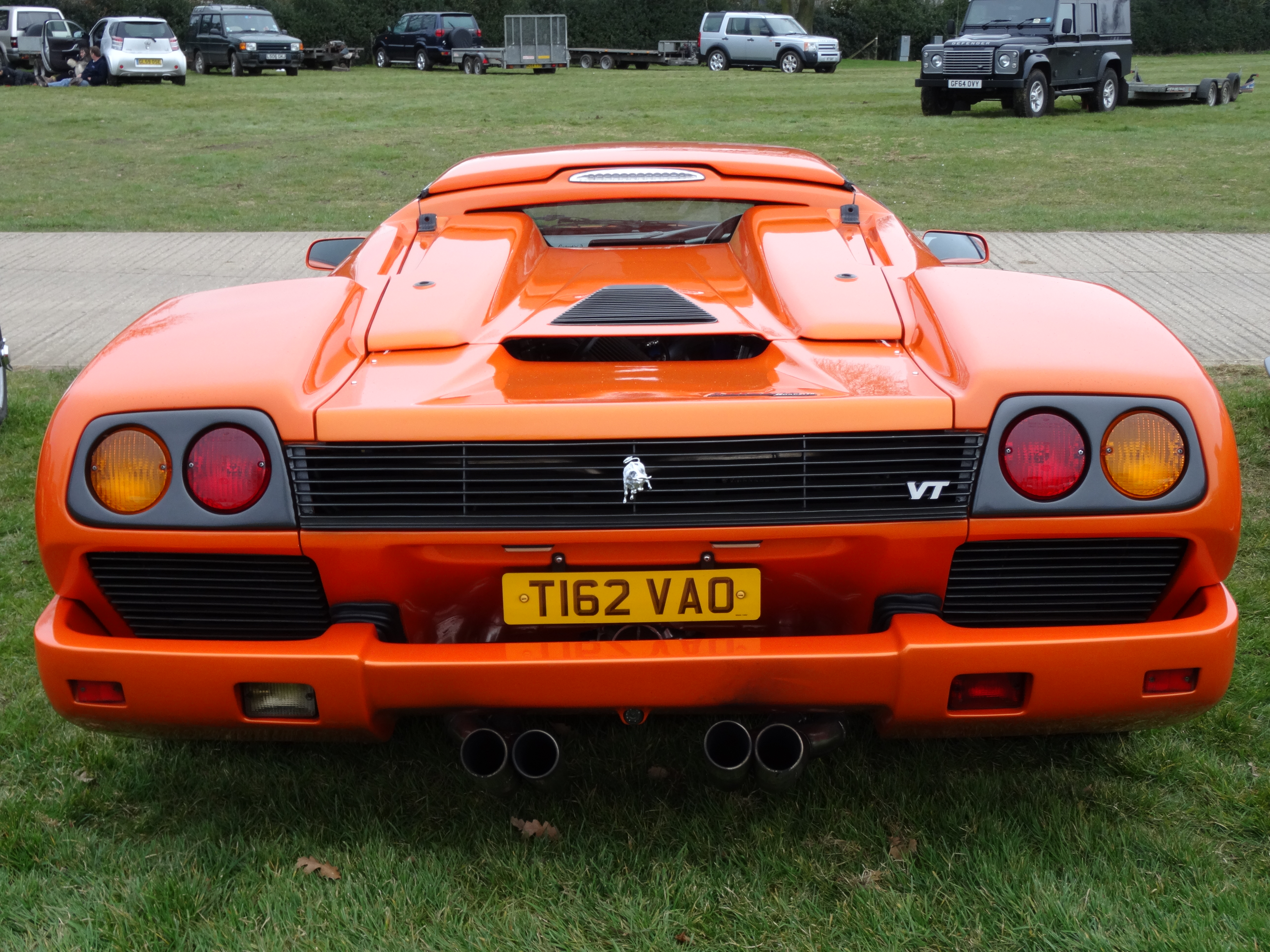
Diablo VT roadster (rear)

The engine lid was changed substantially in order to provide proper ventilation when the roof panel was covering it. The roadster also featured revised 17 inch wheels and the air intakes on top/sides were made larger than the Diablo coupé. For the 1998 Diablo SV, VT, and VT Roadster, the wheels were updated to 18 inches to accommodate bigger brakes, and the engine power output raised to 530 PS (390 kW; 523 hp) by adding the variable valve timing system. Top speed was also raised to 335 km/h (208 mph).

=== Diablo SV Roadster ===
During 1998, Lamborghini sought to diversify the open top Diablo lineup with the introduction of a rear-wheel-drive variant of the Diablo VT Roadster. Dubbed the Diablo SV Roadster, the car combined the mechanical features offered on the Diablo SV in the open-top configuration of the Diablo VT Roadster. The model retained all the visual elements of the SV variant including the distinctive front bumper, side skirts and the large rear wing along with the repositioned rear lamps. Power output remained the same as the SV coupe at 510 PS (375 kW; 503 hp). Only one prototype of the SV roadster was built before Lamborghini decided to halt the project due to the financial turmoil faced by the company as well as the lack of interest in such a variant. When the Milanese distributor of Lamborghini, Emanuele Conforti, came to know about this variant, he requested then CEO Vittorio di Capua to commission one example for him. This resulted in a production example of the SV roadster being completed on 6 April 1998 in the signature Giallo Orion colour scheme with the "SV" decals on the sides of the car bearing the chassis number WLA12960 which brought up the production of this variant to two units, making it the rarest series-production Lamborghini automobile ever built.

=== Specifications ===
Specification level	Production	Engine	Maximum power	Maximum torque	Drive Layout	Brakes	Curb weight	Weight distribution
Diablo	1990–1998, ~900 built	5.7 L (348 cu in) V12	492 PS (362 kW; 485 hp)	580 N⋅m (428 lb⋅ft)	Rear mid-engine, rear-wheel drive	Brembo servo-assisted four-wheel disc brakes, 330 mm (13.0 in) front × 284 mm (11.2 in) rear	1,576 kg (3,474 lb)	41/59% front/rear
Diablo VT	1993–1998, ~400 built	5.7 L (348 cu in) V12	492 PS (362 kW; 485 hp)	580 N⋅m (428 lb⋅ft)	Rear mid-engine, four-wheel drive, 45% LSD rear & 25% LSD front	Brembo servo-assisted four-wheel disc brakes, 330 mm (13.0 in) front × 310 mm (12.2 in) rear	1,625 kg (3,583 lb)	43/57% front/rear
Diablo SE30	1993, 150 built (25 for US market)	5.7 L (348 cu in) V12	525 PS (386 kW; 518 hp)	580 N⋅m (428 lb⋅ft)	Rear mid-engine, rear-wheel drive	Brembo servo-assisted four-wheel disc brakes, 330 mm (13.0 in) front × 310 mm (12.2 in) rear	1,451 kg (3,199 lb)	41/59% front/rear
Diablo SE30 Jota	1995, 28 kits built	5.7 L (348 cu in) V12	595 PS (438 kW; 587 hp)	639 N⋅m (471 lb⋅ft)	Rear mid-engine, rear-wheel drive	Brembo servo-assisted four-wheel disc brakes, 330 mm (13.0 in) front × 310 mm (12.2 in) rear	1,450 kg (3,197 lb)	
Diablo SV	1995–1998, ~250 built	5.7 L (348 cu in) V12	510 PS (375 kW; 503 hp)	580 N⋅m (428 lb⋅ft)	Rear mid-engine, rear-wheel drive	Brembo servo-assisted four-wheel disc brakes, 340 mm (13.4 in) front × 310 mm (12.2 in) rear	1,576 kg (3,474 lb)	41/59% front/rear
Diablo VT Roadster	1995–1998, ~200 built	5.7 L (348 cu in) V12	492 PS (362 kW; 485 hp)	580 N⋅m (428 lb⋅ft)	Rear mid-engine, four-wheel drive, 45% LSD rear & 25% LSD front	Brembo servo-assisted four-wheel disc brakes, 330 mm (13.0 in) front × 310 mm (12.2 in) rear	1,625 kg (3,583 lb)	47/53% front/rear
Diablo SV Roadster	1998, 2 built	5.7 L (348 cu in) V12	510 PS (375 kW; 503 hp)	580 N⋅m (428 lb⋅ft)	Rear mid-engine, rear-wheel drive	Brembo servo-assisted four-wheel disc brakes, 340 mm (13.4 in) front × 310 mm (12.2 in) rear	1,576 kg (3,474 lb)	

== Facelift (1999–2001) ==
=== Diablo SV (1999) ===
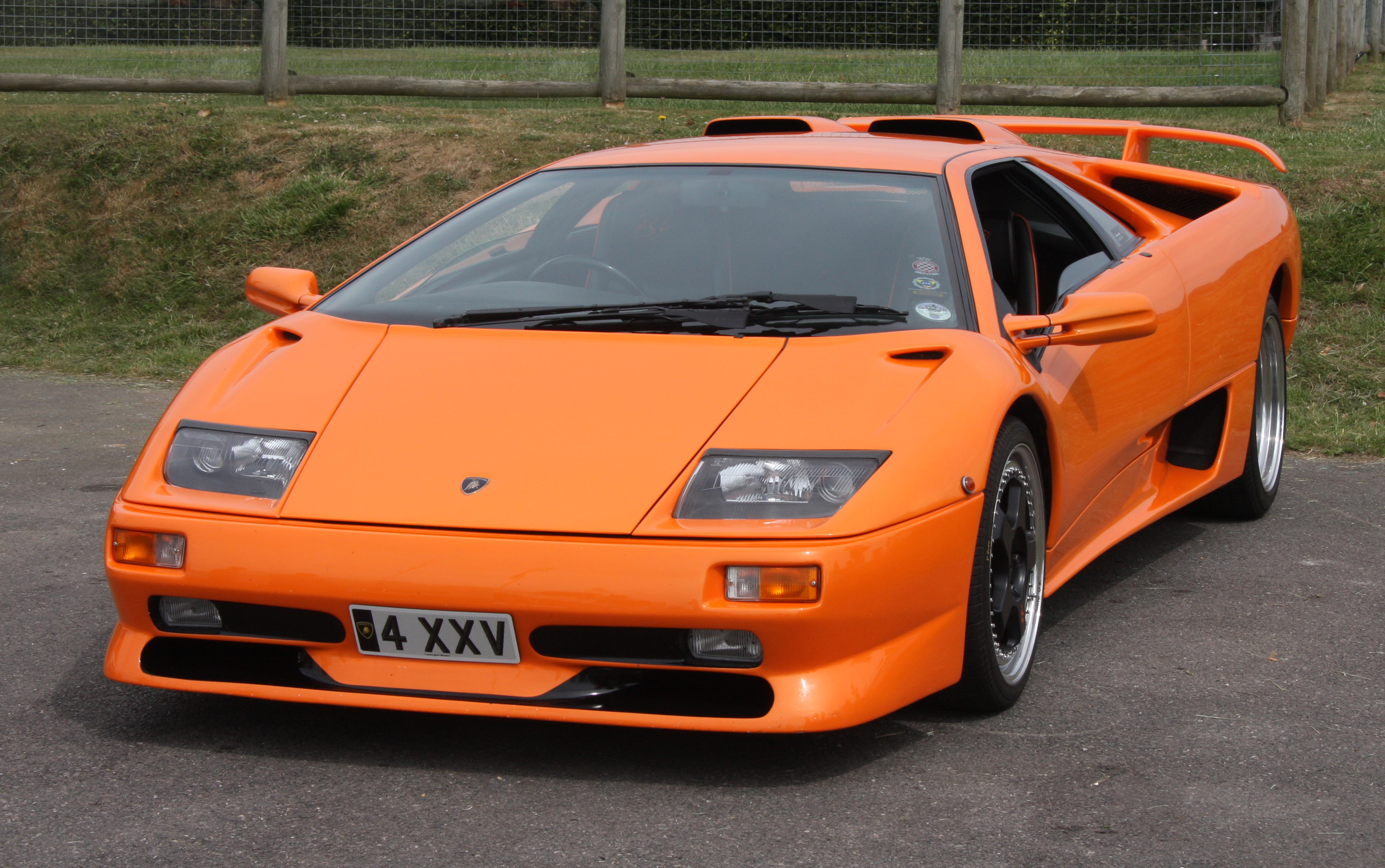
Diablo SV (facelift)

The Diablo received a mid-cycle facelift in 1999. Lamborghini simplified the model range by eliminating the "base" Diablo (since the SV model had become the new entry-level trim) and applied universal revisions across the lineup. The most immediately noticeable exterior change was the replacement of the previous Diablo's pop-up headlamp units with fixed composite lenses, borrowed under license from their original application in the Nissan 300ZX (Z32). All models were also fitted with new 18 inch wheels.

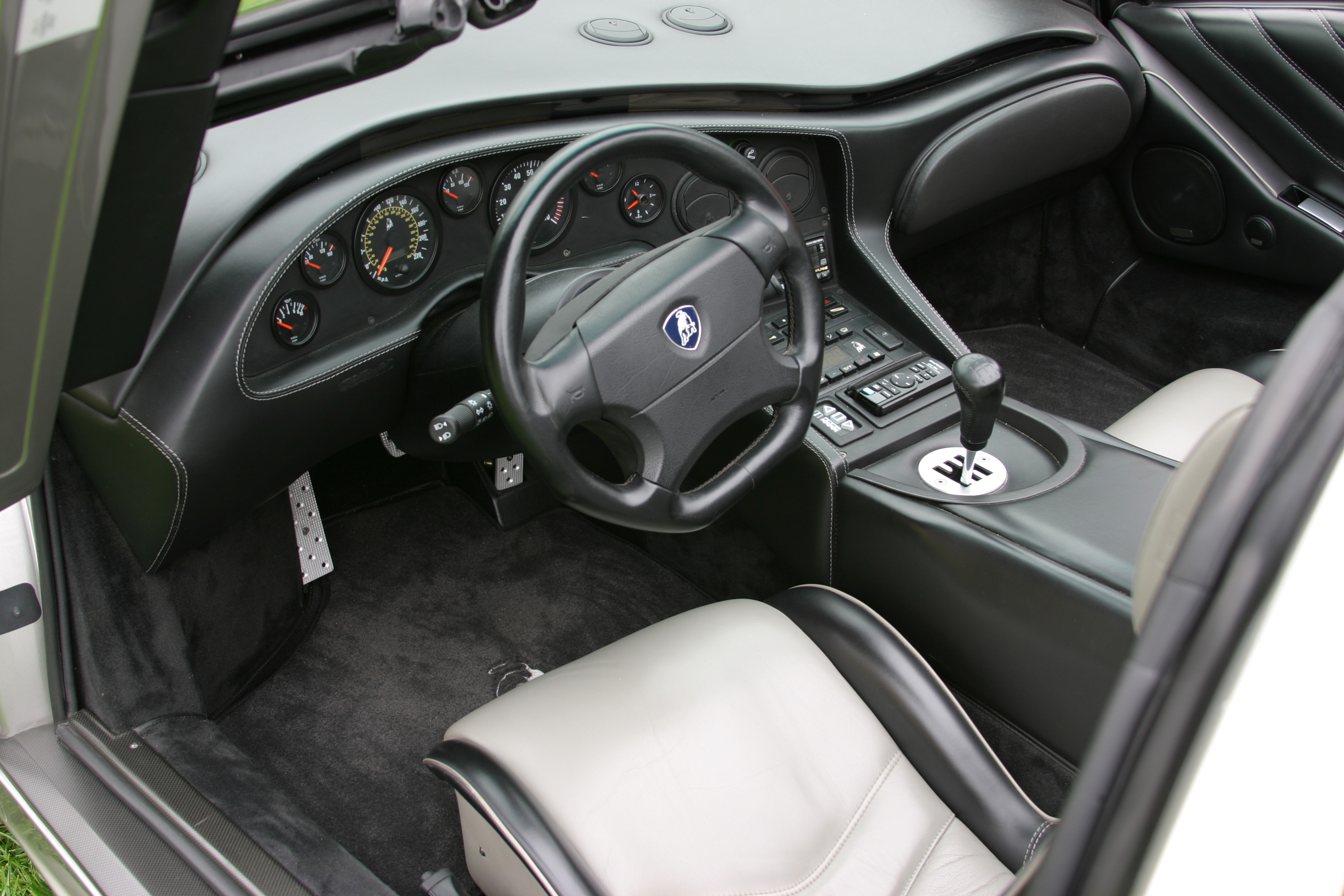
Updated interior

The Diablo range also received an updated interior. Instead of the traditional flat dashboard with a separate upright instrument binnacle, as in many Italian sports cars of the era (and the outgoing Diablo), the new dashboard was an integrated wave-shaped design. A thin strip of black glass ran the length of the dash and contained various instrument indicator and warning lamps. This aesthetic design was inspired by Bang & Olufsen Hi-Fi products.

The power output of the engine was increased to 530 PS (390 kW; 523 hp) and 605 N⋅m (446 lb⋅ft) of torque for both the SV and VT models and now featured variable valve timing. For the first time in a Lamborghini, the Diablo was equipped with a Kelsey-Hayes ABS system, complementing larger diameter brake rotors.

=== Diablo VT and VT Roadster (1999) ===
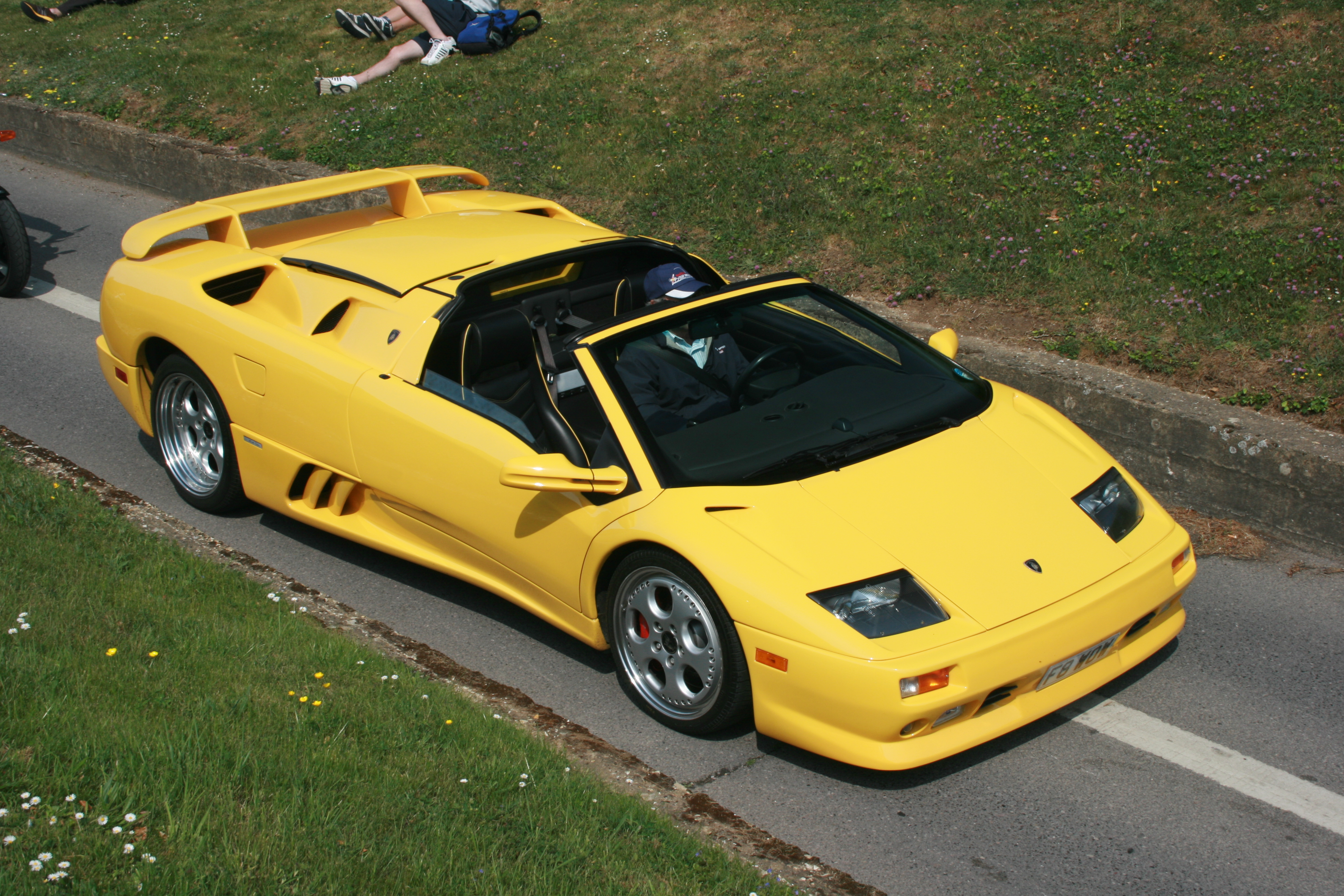
1999 Diablo VT Roadster (note front fascia and rear brake ducts)

The second generation of the VT coupé and roadster received the same cosmetic and mechanical upgrades as the SV model, including the fixed headlamps, restyled interior, 530 PS (390 kW; 523 hp) engine power output, and ABS; little else was changed from the previous generation. All US-spec VT models, coupé and roadster alike, shared the same unique front and rear fascias as seen on the original VT Roadster, along with the vertical rear brake ducts that had debuted on the SE30 model; these cosmetic variations were available as options on VT coupés available in the global market.

A special run of twelve Diablo VT models was produced exclusively for the United States market in 1999 and called the Alpine Edition. As the Diablo had been utilising Alpine stereo equipment since its inception, this very limited production was intended to showcase and celebrate the Lamborghini/Alpine collaboration. The Alpine Edition was a standard Diablo VT with no engine modifications but having carbon fibre trim in various locations along with highlighting the use of Alpine's multimedia system. The stereo receiver was the top-end CVA-1005 model, with integrated navigation system; also included in the package was a DVD player, 6-disc CD changer, and Alpine's top-of-the-line tweeters, midrange drivers, and subwoofers along with powered by "Lamborghini" badged Alpine amplifiers. Alpine logos adorned the seat headrests, floor mats, and the special car cover included with this rare model.

Another special twelve-car run of VT models for the US market consisted of VT Roadsters and was called the Momo Edition. Like the Alpine Edition, the Momo Edition catered to the US car buyer's interest in aftermarket products. Lamborghini, rather than spending money to develop certain automotive components, had been using aftermarket suppliers such as Alpine and MOMO to outfit the Diablo. The Momo Edition was again a standard VT Roadster, but featured special upholstery, MOMO 4-point seatbelt harnesses, and MOMO chrome wheels. Like the Alpine Edition, the Momo Edition also had MOMO logos embroidered in the seat headrests and floor mats.

The VT Roadster enjoyed one final limited run of 30 cars for the 2000 model year, after the introduction of the Diablo VT 6.0 (see below). This "Millennium Roadster" model was available in just two colors, Titanium Metallic and yellow, with the 10 cars exported to the United States all finished in Titanium Metallic. Besides an optional carbon fiber spoiler, special two-tone leather interior, and the shorter-ratio SV rear differential (providing enhanced acceleration), this model featured no significant changes from the previous design, and merely served as a final tribute to the outgoing roadster.

The engine lid was changed substantially in order to provide proper ventilation when the roof panel was covering it. The roadster also featured revised 17 inch wheels and the air intakes on top and the sides were made larger than the Diablo coupé. For the 1998 Diablo SV, VT, and VT Roadster, the wheels were updated to 18 inches to accommodate bigger brakes, and the engine power output raised to 530 PS (390 kW; 523 hp) by adding the variable valve timing system. Top speed was also raised to 335 km/h (208 mph).

=== Diablo GT ===
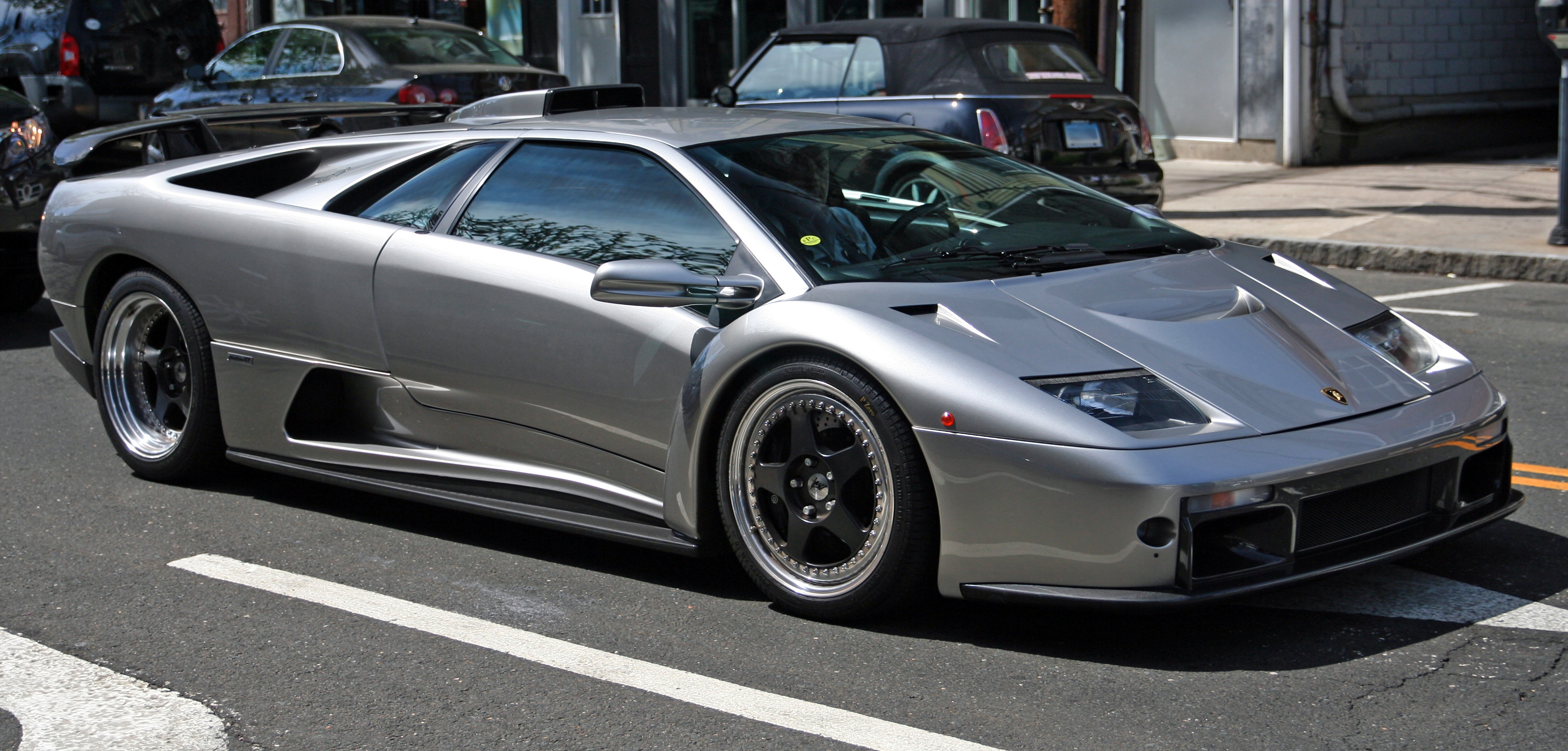
Diablo GT

Lamborghini introduced the Diablo GT in 1998 with only 80 examples being made available for sale. The Diablo GT, like the SE30 and SE30 Jota before it, was a track-oriented iteration of the Diablo and featured many unique components exclusive to the model. The GT featured aggressive bodywork, a stripped-down interior, and an enlarged engine. The GT variant was exclusive to Europe only, but some were imported into the US.

Exterior changes included an all new black carbon fibre front air dam with large brake ducts and a central vent for the oil cooler (the car still featured driving lamps, the single pair of round units featured on the Diablo VT Roadster). At the front, a large air extractor was added, while the small corner vents on the front quarter panels were changed to NACA style ducts. The front quarter panels themselves were widened to accommodate a wider front track. At the rear, the bumper and its lamps were removed entirely, replaced by a large carbon fibre diffuser which shielded a pair of large center-mounted exhaust pipes. As a result of this modification, the fog and reversing lamps were integrated into the outer pair of the tail lamps. The engine lid featured a large central ram air duct protruding above the roof for better cooling and a rear spoiler was standard equipment. The GT's body-work was composed mostly of carbon fibre, with the steel roof and aluminum doors being the only components to retain their standard material. Special 3-piece OZ wheels finished the GT's exterior package.

Inside, the GT had more prominent carbon fibre panels, race-spec bucket seats with four-point seatbelt harnesses, a smaller steering wheel, and an optional Alpine LCD screen for GPS navigation along with a bumper mounted reversing camera. Despite the racing pretenses of the model, air conditioning was still installed as standard equipment. The airbags could be optionally omitted.

While the basic V12 block remained the same, the engine was stroked from 80 mm (3.1 in) to 84 mm (3.3 in) for a new displacement of 6.0 L (366 cu in); this engine, which would later be used in the revised Diablo VT 6.0, had a power output of 575 PS (423 kW; 567 hp) and 630 N⋅m (465 lb⋅ft) of torque. The transmission was the same 5-speed unit as used in other Diablo variants, but different gear ratios could be specified by the buyer. The car omitted the all-wheel-drive system to save weight.

=== Diablo VT 6.0 and VT 6.0 SE ===
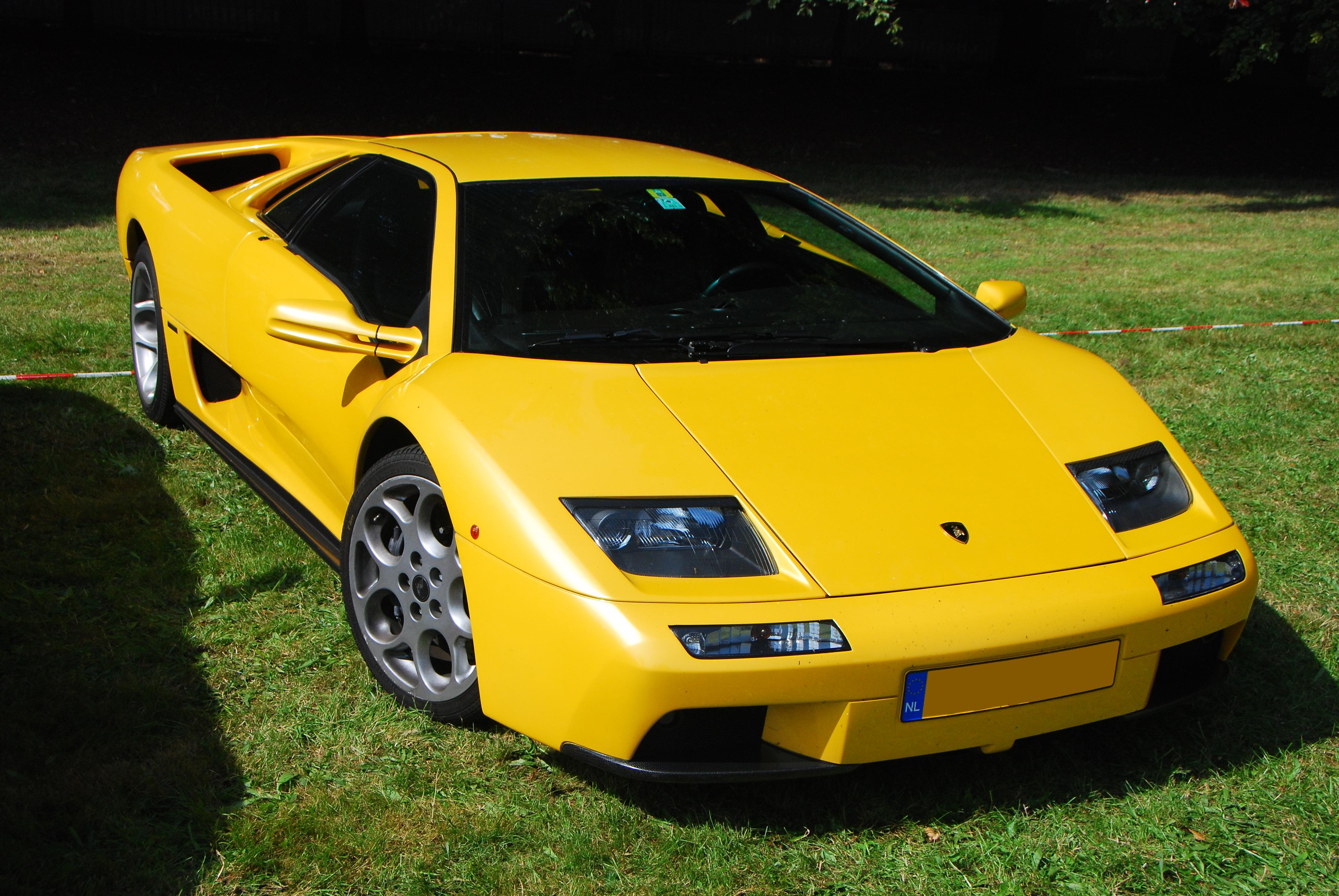
Diablo VT 6.0

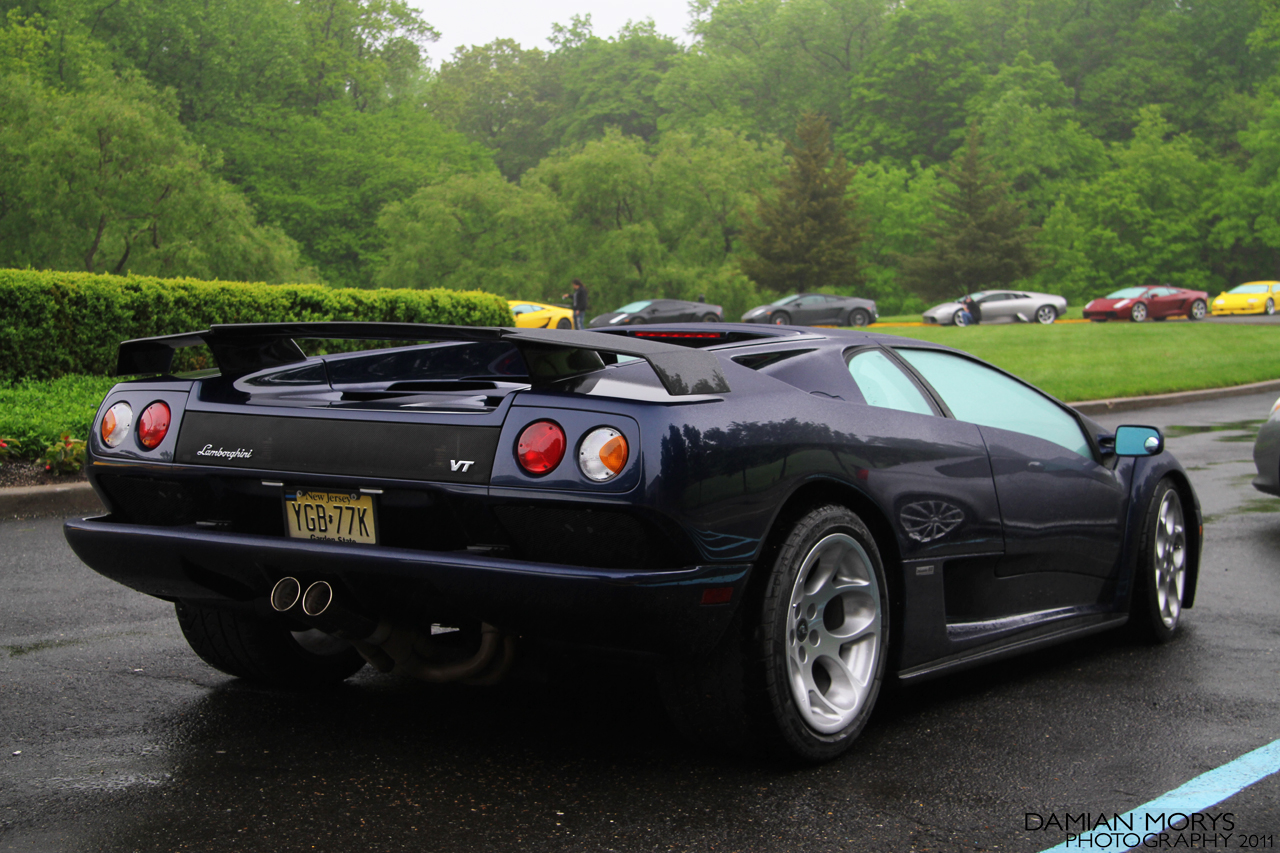
Rear view

After the acquisition of Lamborghini by Audi in 1998, its new owners set out to modernise and refine the Diablo while its successor, the Murciélago, was being developed. Audi tasked then Lamborghini chief designer Luc Donckerwolke to design a more refined and modern Diablo. The VT 6.0 as a result, featured significant styling changes both inside and out.

On the exterior, the VT 6.0 differed from its predecessors with a revised front fascia that featured two large air intakes (similar to those later used on the Murciélago). The air dam, front bumper, and quarter panels were all reworked, the turn-signals were enlarged and shifted below the headlights, and the small air inlets at the top of the quarter panels were removed. The rear of the car remained familiar, but the taillight surrounds were now body-colored (rather than transparent, red or black) and the lamps themselves used the configuration seen on the track-oriented GT variant. Aluminum 18 inch OZ wheels which were styled with a 5-hole "phone dial" design similar to that seen on the later models of the Countach were used. The interior was refined by improved air-conditioning and revised seat and pedal alignment.

The engine was shared with the limited production GT variant and had updated ECU software in addition to new intake and exhaust systems and a refined variable valve timing system with revised camshafts. The engine had a power output of 550 PS (405 kW; 542 hp) and 620 N⋅m (457 lb⋅ft) of torque.

Due to the development of the Murciélago, the Diablo VT 6.0 was only available in the coupé bodystyle with no more roadster or SV models planned; however, customers could specially order a rear-wheel drive version of the VT 6.0.

At the end of the Diablo's production run, the company introduced the limited production Diablo VT 6.0 SE. This model was only available in two colours; the gold metallic "Oro Elios" (gold sun) represented sunrise, while the color-shifting bronze/maroon "Marrone Eklipsis" (brown eclipse) represented the sunset. Other changes included a new magnesium intake manifold, short-ratio transmission, special upholstery treatment, "Lamborghini" badged brake calipers, comprehensive road map software in the navigation system, and enhanced carbon fibre trim on the interior. The power output remained the same as on the Diablo VT 6.0. Production was limited to 42 units.

=== Specifications ===
Specification level	Production	Engine	Maximum power	Maximum torque	Drive Layout	Brakes	Curb weight	Weight distribution
Diablo SV (MY1999 Facelift)	1998–1999, ~100 built	5.7 L (348 cu in) V12	530 PS (390 kW; 523 hp)	605 N⋅m (446 lb⋅ft)	Rear mid-engine, rear-wheel drive	Brembo servo-assisted, ventilated, cross-drilled four-wheel disc brakes, 355 mm (14.0 in) front × 335 mm (13.2 in) rear, with Kelsey-Hayes ABS	1,530 kg (3,373 lb)	41/59% front/rear
Diablo VT (MY1999 Facelift)	1998–2000, ~150 built	5.7 L (348 cu in) V12	530 PS (390 kW; 523 hp)	605 N⋅m (446 lb⋅ft)	Rear mid-engine, four-wheel drive, 45% LSD rear & 25% LSD front (SV rear with 2.53:1 ratio used on Millennium Roadster)	Brembo servo-assisted, ventilated, cross-drilled four-wheel disc brakes, 365 mm (14.4 in) front × 335 mm (13.2 in) rear, with Kelsey-Hayes ABS	1,625 kg (3,583 lb)	43/57% front/rear
Diablo VT Roadster (MY1999 Facelift)	1998–2000, ~100 built + 30 Millennium Roadster	5.7 L (348 cu in) V12	530 PS (390 kW; 523 hp)	605 N⋅m (446 lb⋅ft)	Rear mid-engine, four-wheel drive, 45% LSD rear & 25% LSD front (SV rear with 2.53:1 ratio used on Millennium Roadster)	Brembo servo-assisted, ventilated, cross-drilled four-wheel disc brakes, 365 mm (14.4 in) front × 335 mm (13.2 in) rear, with Kelsey-Hayes ABS	1,625 kg (3,583 lb)	43/57% front/rear
Diablo GT	1999–2000, 83 built	6.0 L (366 cu in) V12	575 PS (423 kW; 567 hp)	630 N⋅m (465 lb⋅ft)	Rear mid-engine, rear-wheel drive	Brembo servo-assisted, ventilated, cross-drilled four-wheel disc brakes, 355 mm (14.0 in) front × 335 mm (13.2 in) rear, with Lucas ABS	1,460 kg (3,219 lb)	40/60% front/rear
Diablo VT 6.0 and VT 6.0 SE	2000–2001, 343 VT 6.0 and 42 VT 6.0 SE built	6.0 L (366 cu in) V12	550 PS (405 kW; 542 hp)	620 N⋅m (457 lb⋅ft)	Rear mid-engine, four-wheel drive, 45% LSD rear & 25% LSD front (rear-wheel drive optional)	Brembo servo-assisted four-wheel disc brakes, 365 mm (14.4 in) front × 335 mm (13.2 in) rear, with Lucas ABS	1,625 kg (3,583 lb)	41/59% front/rear

== Factory racing specials ==
=== Diablo Jota GT1 LM ===
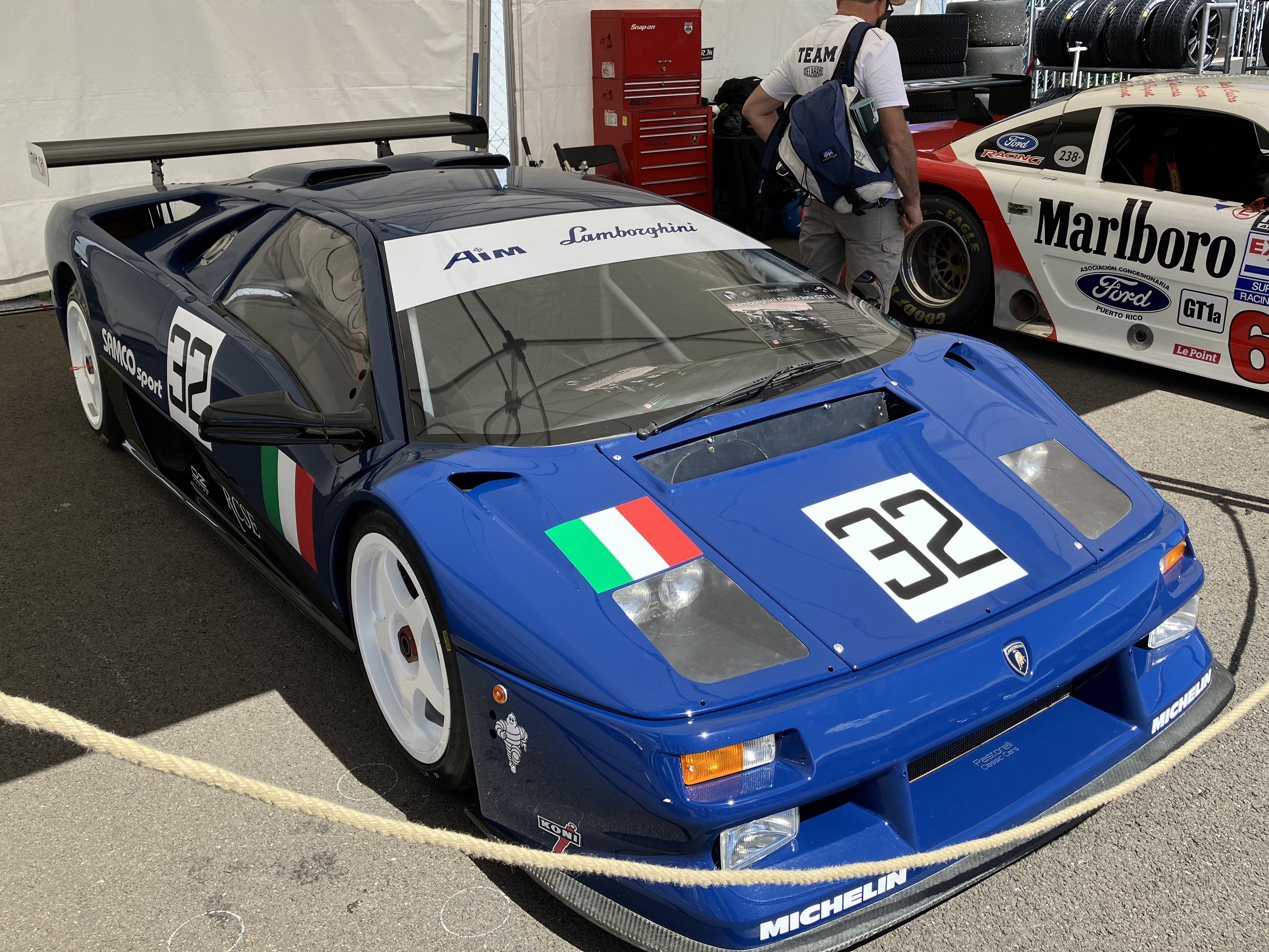
Diablo Jota GT1 LM at the 2022 Le Mans Classic

In early 1995, Lamborghini planned to compete in GT1 class of the 24 Hours of Le Mans by entering a Diablo into the competition. Amos Racing in the UK was contracted to develop the vehicle and have it ready in time for the June 1995 24h race, The Larrousse Formula One team under contract with Lamborghini at the time did the first testing and shake down on behalf of Lamborghini and Amos racing. Disputes between the factory and the sponsors led to the project's demise and the car did not end up competing in the race.

=== Diablo Jota JGTC ===
In 1995, to compete in the newly formed JGTC class racing in Japan, Japan Lamborghini Owners Club (JLOC) ordered two Diablos with competition specification from Lamborghini along with at least one road legal variation for homologation purposes. The cars were developed with technical support of Lamborghini Engineering and were allowed to be named Jota. All of the three cars produced still exist in Japan.

The first car, the Jota PO.01, actually competed in JGTC series racing in the 1995 and 1996 seasons. It has a dry-sump 5,707 cc (5.7 L) engine with Multi Mode Engine Control (MMEC) technology which had been developed during the 1991 Formula One season. The second car, the Jota PO.02, was also developed in 1995 with specifications for endurance racing and competed in the Suzuka 1000 km race. Although it was planned to enter 24 Hours of Le Mans but unknown reasons prevented it from competing The third car, the Jota PO.03, is the road legal homologation special.

=== Diablo GT1 Stradale ===
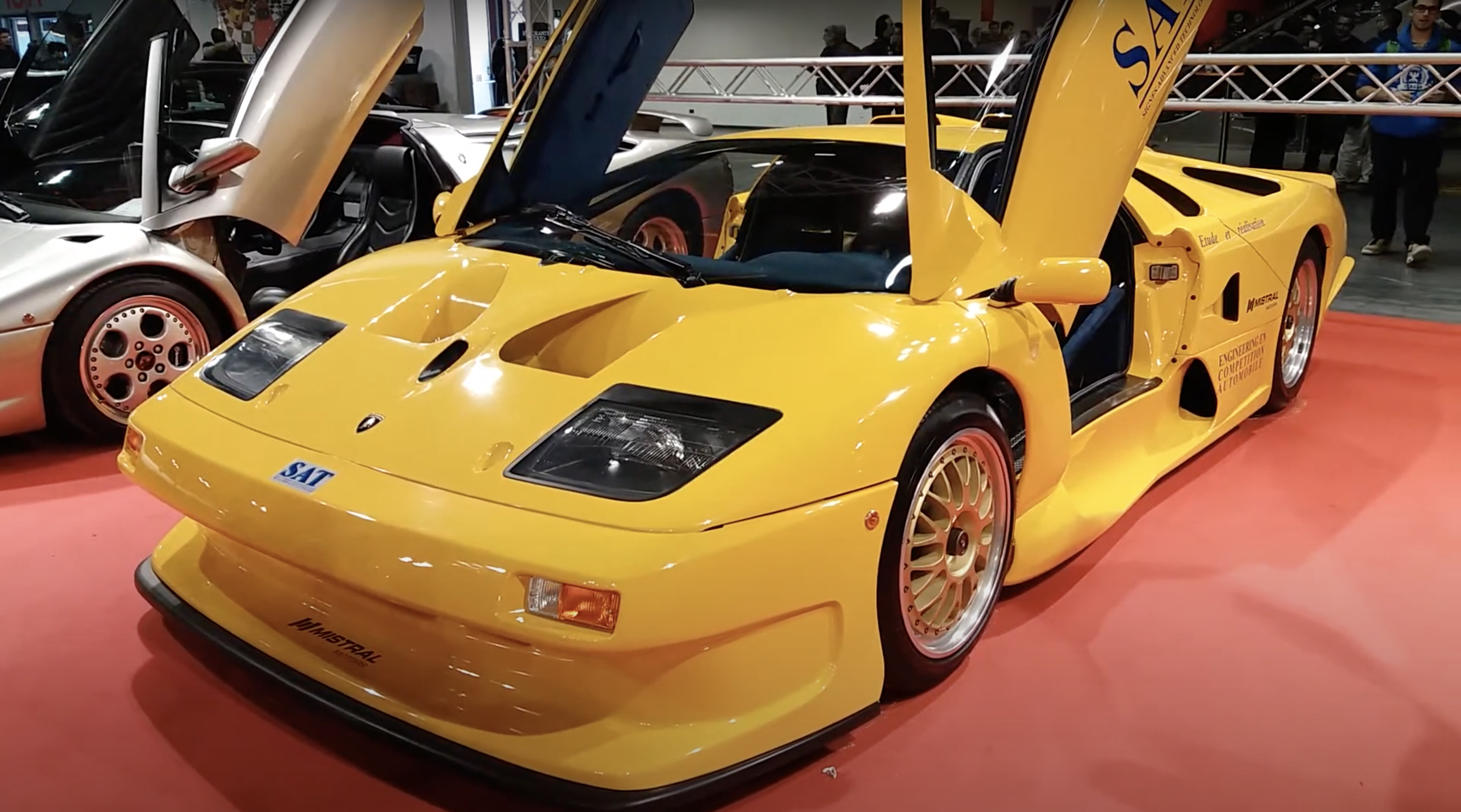
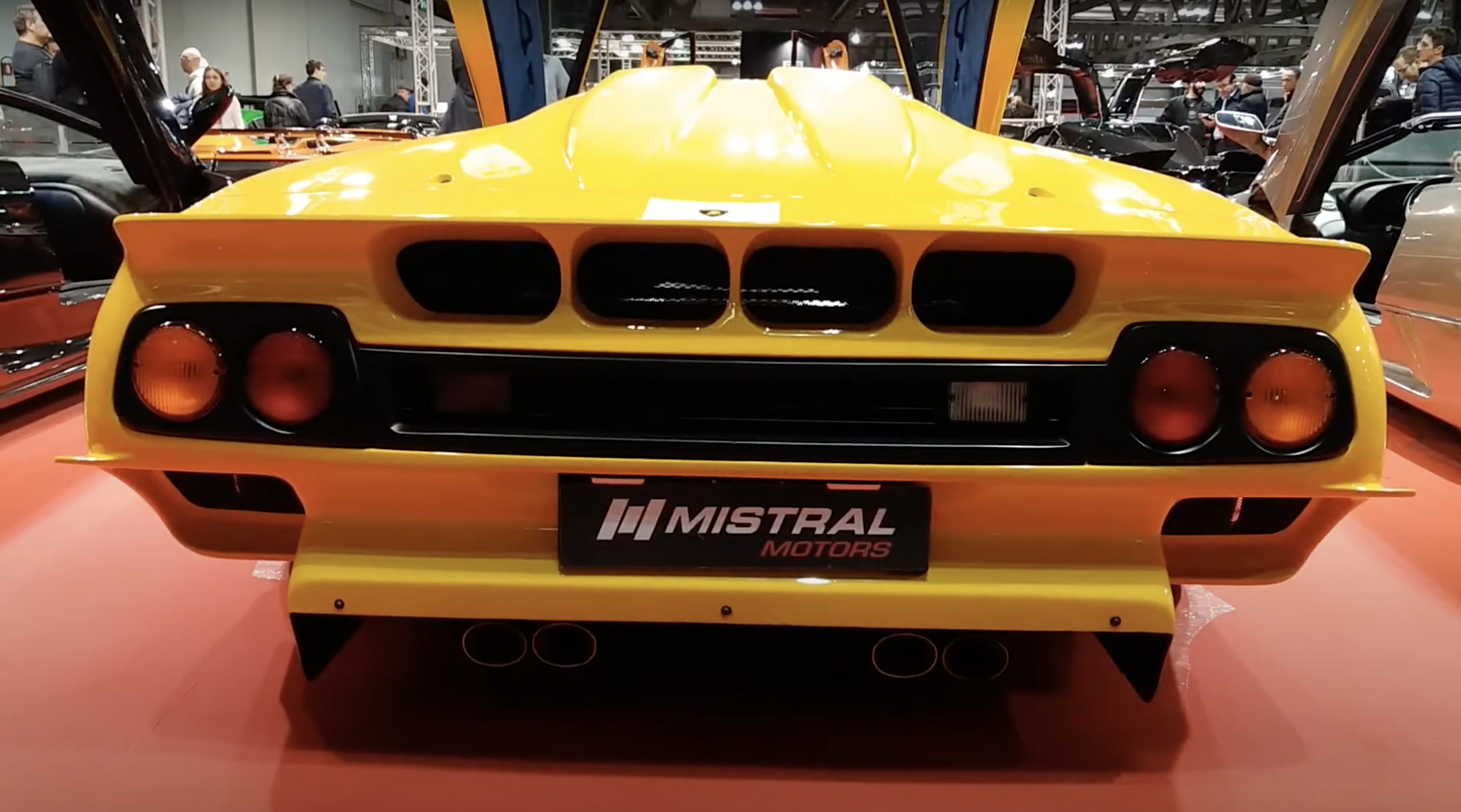
Diablo GT1 Stradale

Following the foot-steps of Porsche in 1996 with the GT1, a purpose-built racing car that created a stir in motorsports, Lamborghini contracted Signes Advanced Technologies (SAT), a company based in Toulon, France, specialising in manufacturing prototype race cars, to develop a racing version of the Diablo to enter in the GT1 class racing for the second time. The company would build an entirely new chassis made of tubular steel and a carbon fibre body bearing only a slight resemblance to the road going Diablo with Lamborghini supplying the engine and getting the project through homologation.

The 5.7 L V12 engine used in the standard Diablo variants was stroked to a displacement of 6.0 L utilising a reprogrammed engine management system. The new engine had a maximum power output of 655 PS (482 kW; 646 hp) at 7,500 rpm and 687 N⋅m (507 lb⋅ft) of torque at 5,500 rpm and transferred the power to the rear wheels through a 6-speed Hewland sequential manual transmission. The finished car weighed a total of 1,050 kg (2,315 lb) making it the lightest Diablo variant ever produced. A very deep chin spoiler and fixed front lamps along with an adjustable rear wing was one of the main changes made to the body work. The front and rear section of the car were entirely removable to allow easy access to the mechanicals of the car, the wheelbase and length of the car was increased than a standard Diablo for enhanced performance. Larger air intakes on the rear, NACA ducts near the doors and air intakes from the Diablo SV improved engine cooling. The car utilised scissor doors and tail lights from a regular Diablo further increasing its resemblance with the road going model. Other features included purpose built race interior, plexiglass windows, 18-inch centre-lock OZ racing wheels and an integrated roll-cage.

The car was presented in 1997 to the factory in the presence of FIA representatives who approved and homologated the car for racing. However, financial difficulties surrounding Lamborghini at that time forced the company to not go further with the project. Two cars were built, one was meant for racing and one was the road legal version which dropped the rear wing. The racing version was bought by the JLOC racing team from Japan, who used it in the All Japan Grand Touring Car Championship series from 1997 until 2000 with minimal success. From 2001 to 2003, the racing version competed under the Diablo JGT-1 guise, featuring a reworked chassis and suspension along with other parts independently built by JLOC for JGTC competition. However, it continued to struggle against the factory-backed entries in GT500 and JLOC subsequently retired the car in 2004. The road version remained in the ownership of SAT until it was sold to Mistral Motors in Italy.

=== Diablo SV-R ===
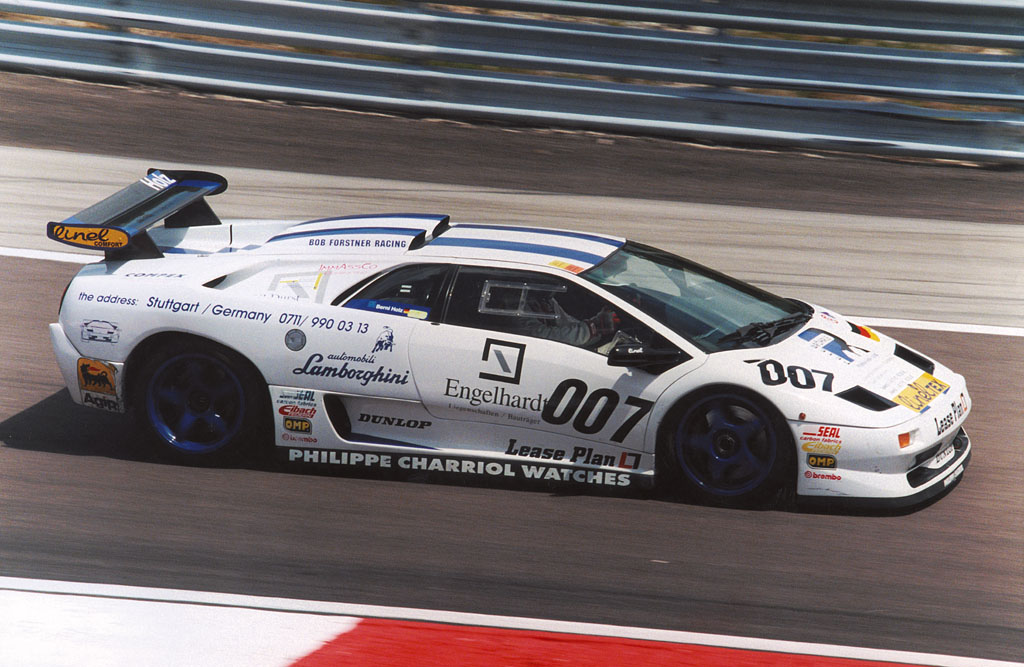
Diablo SV-R competing at the Lamborghini "Supertrophy" event

Unveiled at the 1996 Geneva Motor Show, the Diablo SV-R is a lightweight competition version of the SV and the first Lamborghini to be officially built for motorsport purposes, as Ferruccio Lamborghini had never desired to build "street legal race cars" like rival Ferrari. Rather than comply with the requirements for any established racing series, Lamborghini created its own Lamborghini Supertrophy which ran for four years (replaced later with the GTR Supertrophy for the Diablo GTR), with its inaugural round held as the support race to the 1996 24 Hours of Le Mans. The 28 Diablo SV-R's entered, which were built in 4 months on the Diablo assembly line along with production SV's, all finished this first event without significant problems.

The Diablo SV-R featured a stripped-down interior with a rollcage, racing seats, and a removable steering wheel; the power glass side windows were replaced with fixed Plexiglass with traditional race-style sliding sections. On the exterior, the electric pop-up headlamps were replaced either with fixed units (similar to those which appeared later on the road cars in 1999) or with air vents for the front brakes. A larger, deeper front spoiler was fitted, while the rear bumper was replaced with a diffuser assembly. The standard rear wing was also replaced with an adjustable carbon fibre unit. Side skirts were added for aerodynamics, but this left so little ground clearance that pneumatic air jacks also had to be installed to raise the car for service in the pit lane. Lightweight, hollow center-lock OZ wheels were used, although these were later switched to stronger Speedline units. Linear-rate springs were used with Koni shock absorbers and were adjusted to about twice the stiffness of stock Diablo SV suspension. With all modifications, the SV-R weighed 1,385 kg (3,053 lb), 191 kg (421 lb) less than the standard SV model.

Under the engine lid, the standard 5.7 liter V12 engine remained, but was reworked to have a power output of 540 PS (397 kW; 533 hp) and 598 N⋅m (441 lb⋅ft) of torque by means of a revised fuel system and variable valve timing, which would later appear on production Diablos. The engine was bolted to a 6-speed manual transmission. Each car sold came with a season's factory support and an entry to the one-make series. All repairs and maintenance were carried out by Lamborghini.

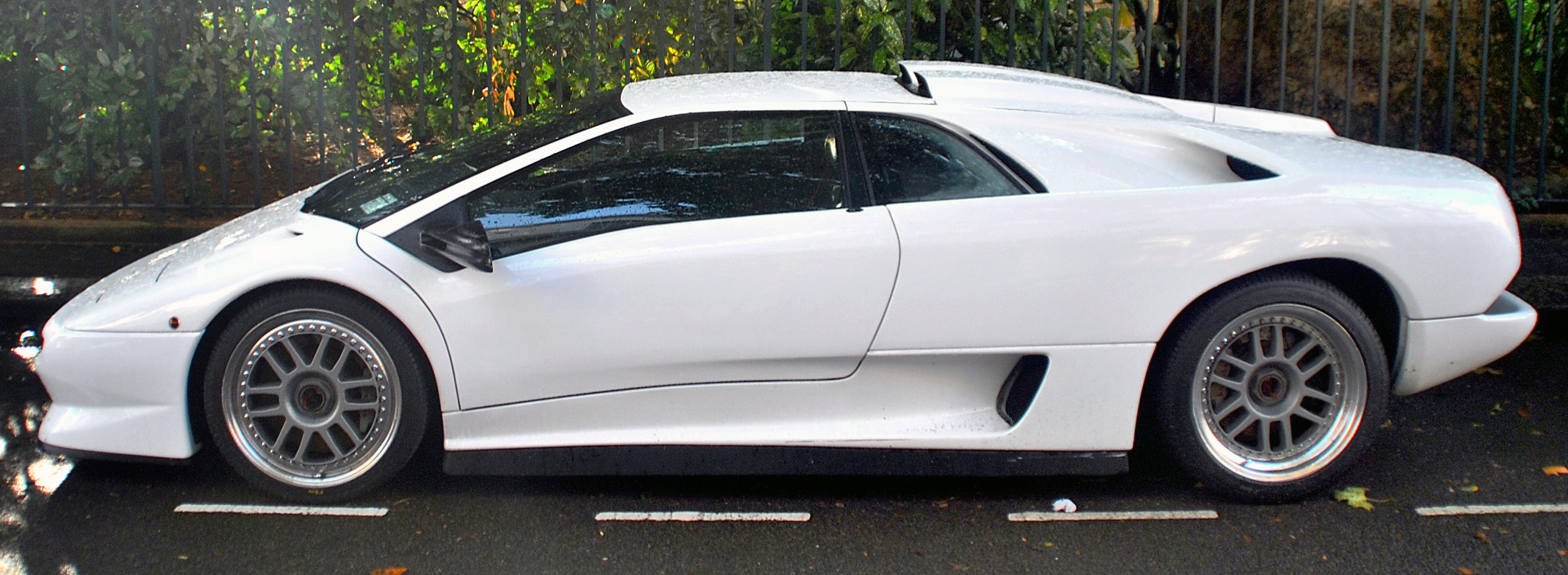
A Diablo SV-R converted for road use

The series' first title winner was BPR regular, Thomas Bscher, who became involved with the business side of the brand in later years. In total, 31 examples of the SV-R were produced. Only a few cars have been modified for road use, including one in the United States which received a Diablo VT 6.0 front clip and was painted with the Stars and Stripes.

=== Diablo GT2 ===
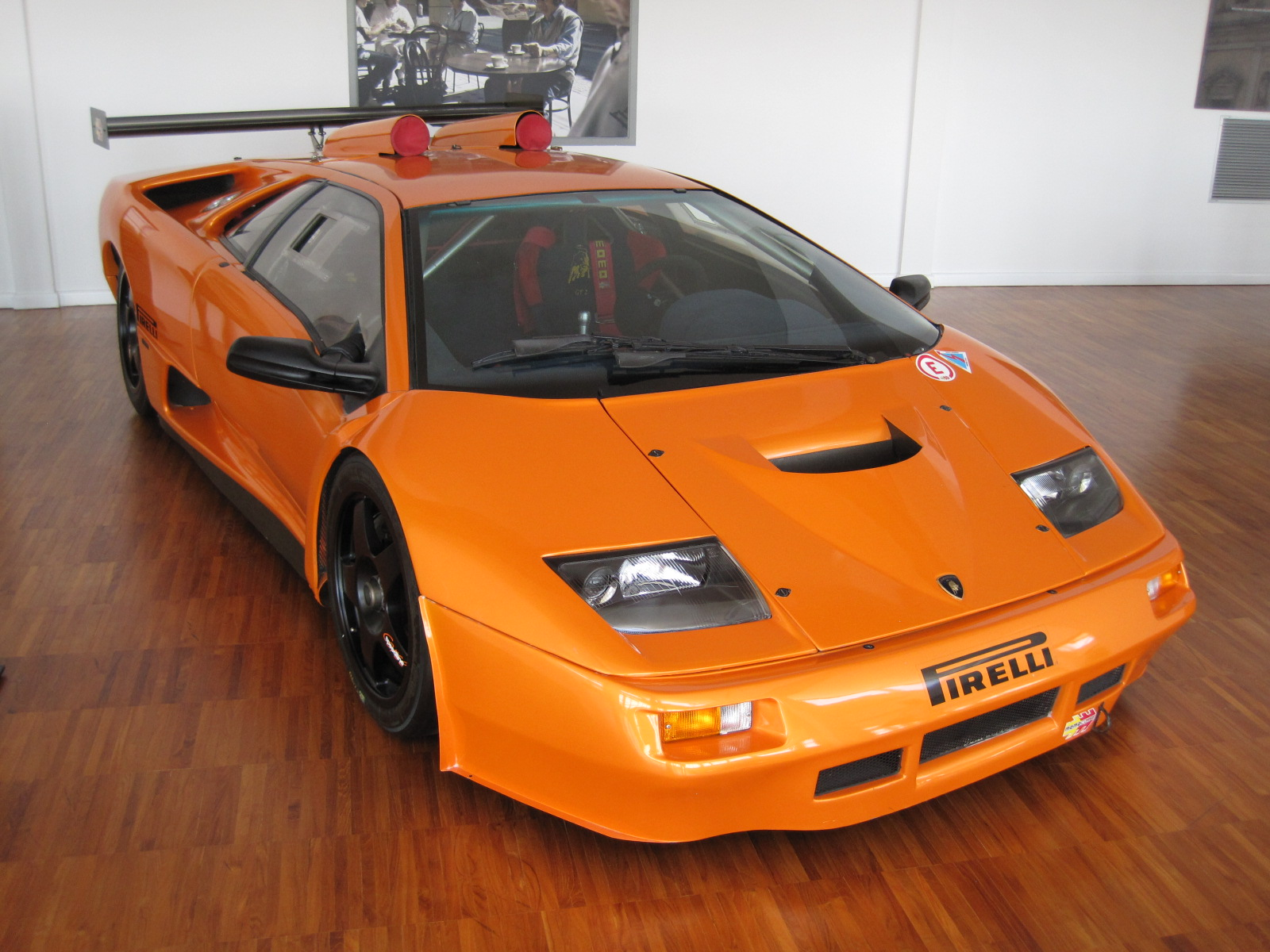
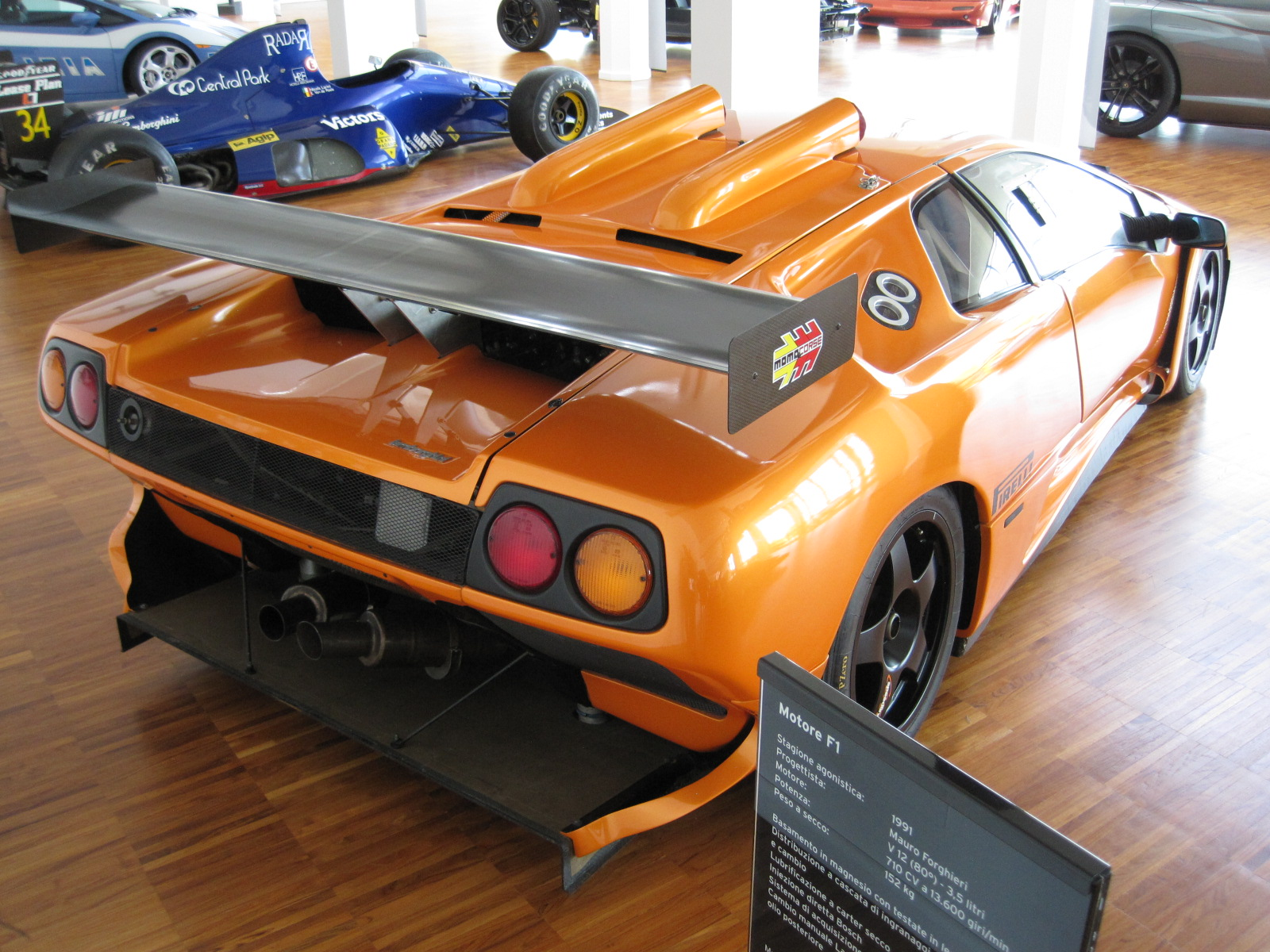
Diablo GT2 Evoluzione

Following the success of the Diablo SV-R in lower class racing, Lamborghini decided to enter the Diablo in GT2 class racing. Primarily because of failed attempts in 1995 and 1996 to enter the famed GT1 class. A new car was developed based on the Diablo SV which later became the basis for the infamous Diablo GT and the Diablo GTR, the car was called the Diablo GT2 and it featured a detuned variant of the 6.0 L V12 engine used in the Diablo GT1 Stradale. The engine had a power output of 600 hp (608 PS; 447 kW). The interior was stripped of all luxuries and featured a racing steering wheel with an integrated digital speedometer, fire extinguisher system, racing cut off switch, removable engine cover with quick release system, plexiglass windows with sliding sections, integrated roll-cage, fast filling fuel cell system instead of the conventional fuel tank, centre-lock wheels and a large CFRP fixed rear wing. Many features of the car were carried out to the Diablo GT along with later Lamborghini models such as the large air intake at the front, removable engine covers, central dual exhaust system and the engine itself, which was detuned for road usage. The project was scrapped when Audi took over the company. The car was given an update sometime in 2002 and was known as the Diablo GT2 Evoluzione which included different front and rear bumpers, rear wing from the Diablo GTR and a modified air intake system for the engine, but the car was never entered into competitive racing.

=== Diablo GTR ===
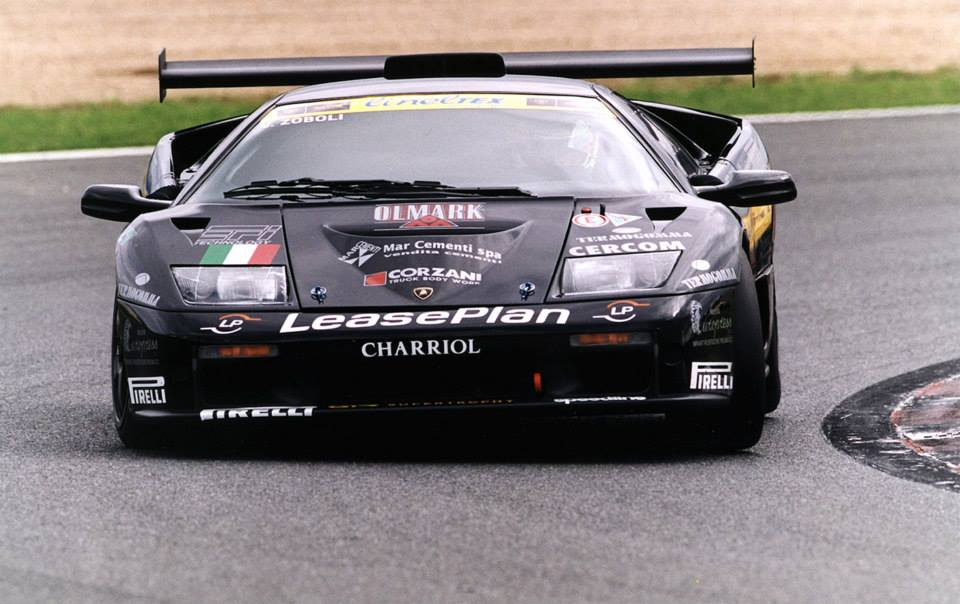
Diablo GTR

After campaigning the Diablo SV-R for four years in the Diablo Supertrophy, Lamborghini launched a completely new car for the 2000 season. Just as the SV-R was a race-ready SV, the Diablo GTR, introduced at the 1999 Bologna Motor Show, was a Diablo GT converted to a track oriented specification with power and handling improvements, a stripped interior, and weight reduction.

The GTR's interior was stripped down to save weight; the air conditioning, stereo, and sound and heatproofing were removed, and a single racing seat with 6-point seatbelt harness, MOMO fire suppression system and steering wheel, complete integrated roll cage, fixed Plexiglass windows with sliding sections, and newly designed air intake were fitted.

The GT had already featured an aggressive, track-oriented styling, but the GTR took this a little further with features such as an even larger rear wing bolted directly to the chassis like a true race car, 18 inch hollow magnesium Speedline centerlock wheels, pneumatic air jacks for raising the car in the pit lane (like the SV-R, it was too low for a rolling jack), and an emergency fuel shutoff switch on the left front fender.

The GTR utilized the same basic 6.0-litre V12 engine that had made its debut on the street-legal GT, but with revised fuel and ignition systems, individual throttle bodies, a dynamic air intake duct system, variable valve timing, titanium connecting rods, and a lightened crankshaft. These improvements allowed the engine to have a power output of 590 PS (434 kW; 582 hp) and 640 N⋅m (472 lb⋅ft) of torque. The engine was bolted to the usual 5-speed transmission in a rear-wheel drive layout. Extra heat exchangers were added for the differential and transmission oil to prevent overheating under extreme racing conditions. A fast-filling racing fuel cell replaced the standard gasoline tank. The suspension was stiffened and lowered, and racing brake calipers were installed.

Thirty cars were initially planned to be produced but actual production amounted to 40 units, and 40 chassis were prepared to replace cars wrecked in racing accidents.

In the hands of multiple Australian Drivers' Champion Paul Stokell, a Diablo GTR run by Team Lamborghini Australia won the 2003 and 2004 Australian Nations Cup Championships. The GTR was also raced by Stokell, Luke Youlden, Peter Hackett and Danish driver Allan Simonsen in the 2003 Bathurst 24 Hour race where after qualifying 6th would go on to finish 8th outright after suffering a number of punctures throughout the race.

== Concept cars ==
=== Introduction ===
In 1995, the ownership of Lamborghini was restructured. Indonesian company V'Power Corporation held 60 percent of the shareholding while the remaining 40 percent stake was controlled by a Malaysian company MyCom Bhd. The restructured ownership hired Vittorio Di Capua, an infamous automobile industry veteran, who had worked at Fiat S.p.A. for 40 years as the new president and CEO of the company, thus replacing Mike Kimberley who had disagreements with the shareholders. Di Capua, after taking the position, initiated a cost-cutting program that led to the departure of many executives and consultants. Under his guidance, the development of the aging Diablo's successor began under the code name P147 (later changed to L147). Di Capua made a decision to use the Diablo's chassis and running gear for the working prototypes in order to save development costs. This development program led to the development of two prototypes, named the Kanto and the Acosta.

==== Lamborghini Acosta (1996) ====
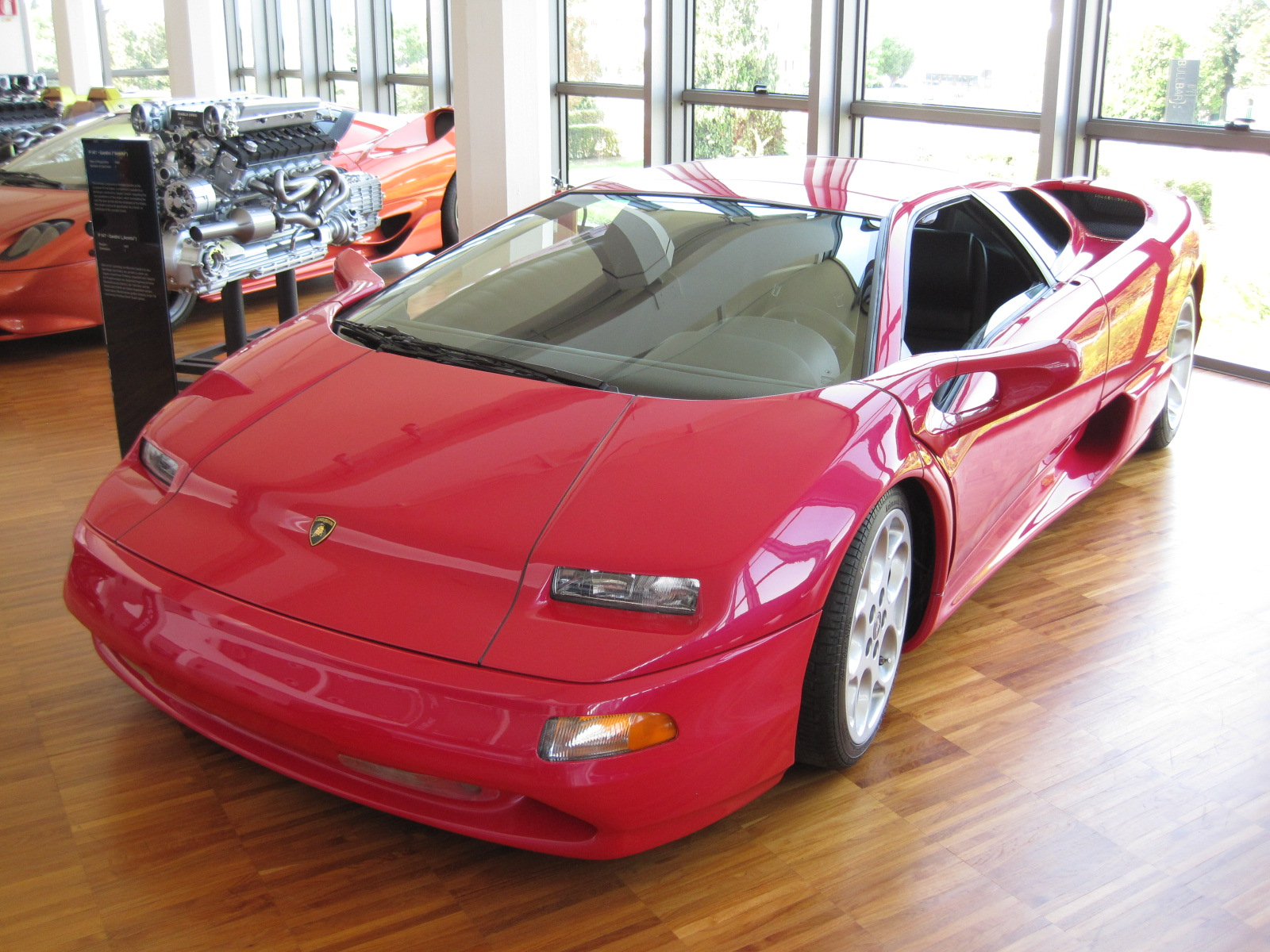
Lamborghini Acosta at the Lamborghini Museum

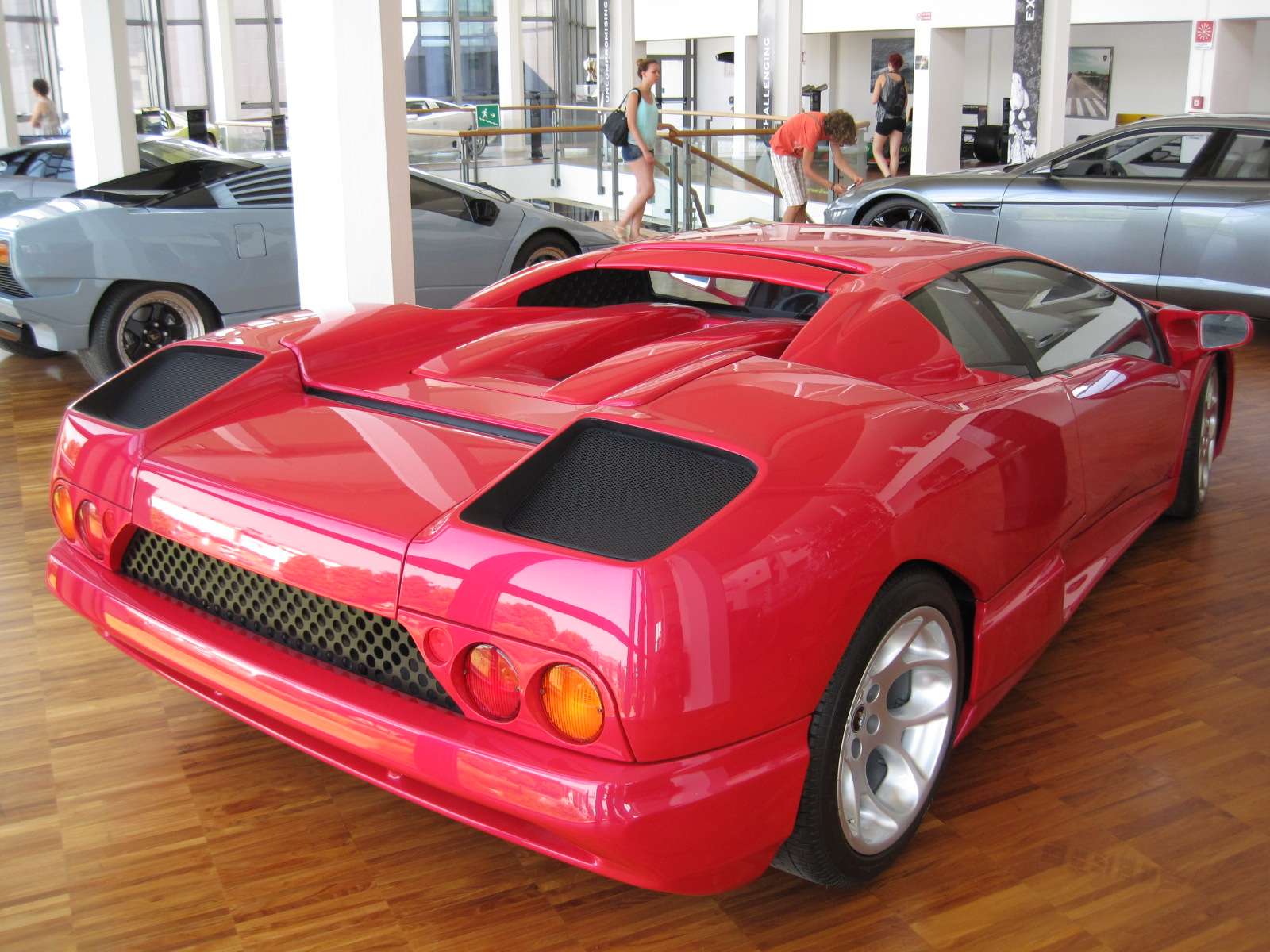
Rear view

Following his involvement in the development of famous Lamborghini models namely the Miura and the Countach, Marcello Gandini, who had now been operating his own design consultancy firm, was entrusted with the design of the Diablo's successor. The car called the Acosta was heavily based on the Diablo following the management's cost cutting policies and was Gandini's interpretation for a modern-day Lamborghini. The Acosta had a fairly angled design language when compared to the Canto (shown below). The large rear cooling intakes were more smooth and were inline with the design language but were followed by equally large outlets at the rear of the car. The front of the car had two thin headlamps joined by a scaffolding which created a bulge on the hood, the bulge were also present on the engine cover to create more room for the engine harking back to the Countach, reducing rear visibility. The wing mirrors were two large units incorporating large openings for better airflow. There was also a small spoiler present on the small window at the rear of the car.

This design was considered too aggressive for a modern Lamborghini and that it was loosely based around the Diablo's design. It was ultimately rejected. The only car completed based on Gandini's design was left without any running gear and is now stored in the Lamborghini Museum.

==== Zagato Raptor (1996) ====
The Zagato Raptor was a 1996 concept designed by Zagato and based on a Lamborghini Diablo VT. Designed with the iconic double-bubble roof which tilted forwards like a fighter jet canopy to provide access to the interior. The car remained a one off as plans to build a limited production run were cancelled.

==== Lamborghini Canto (1997) ====
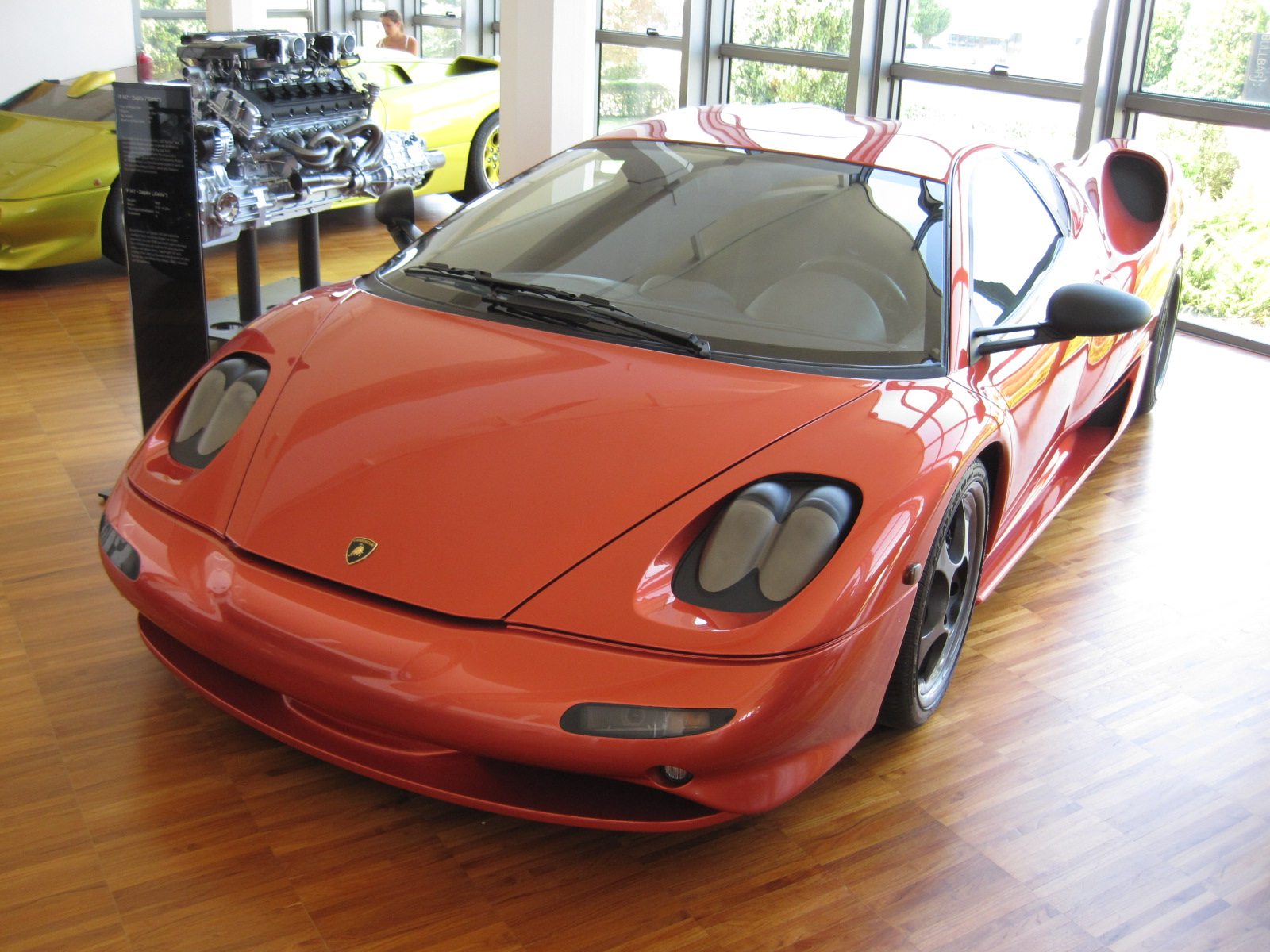
Lamborghini Canto at the Lamborghini Museum

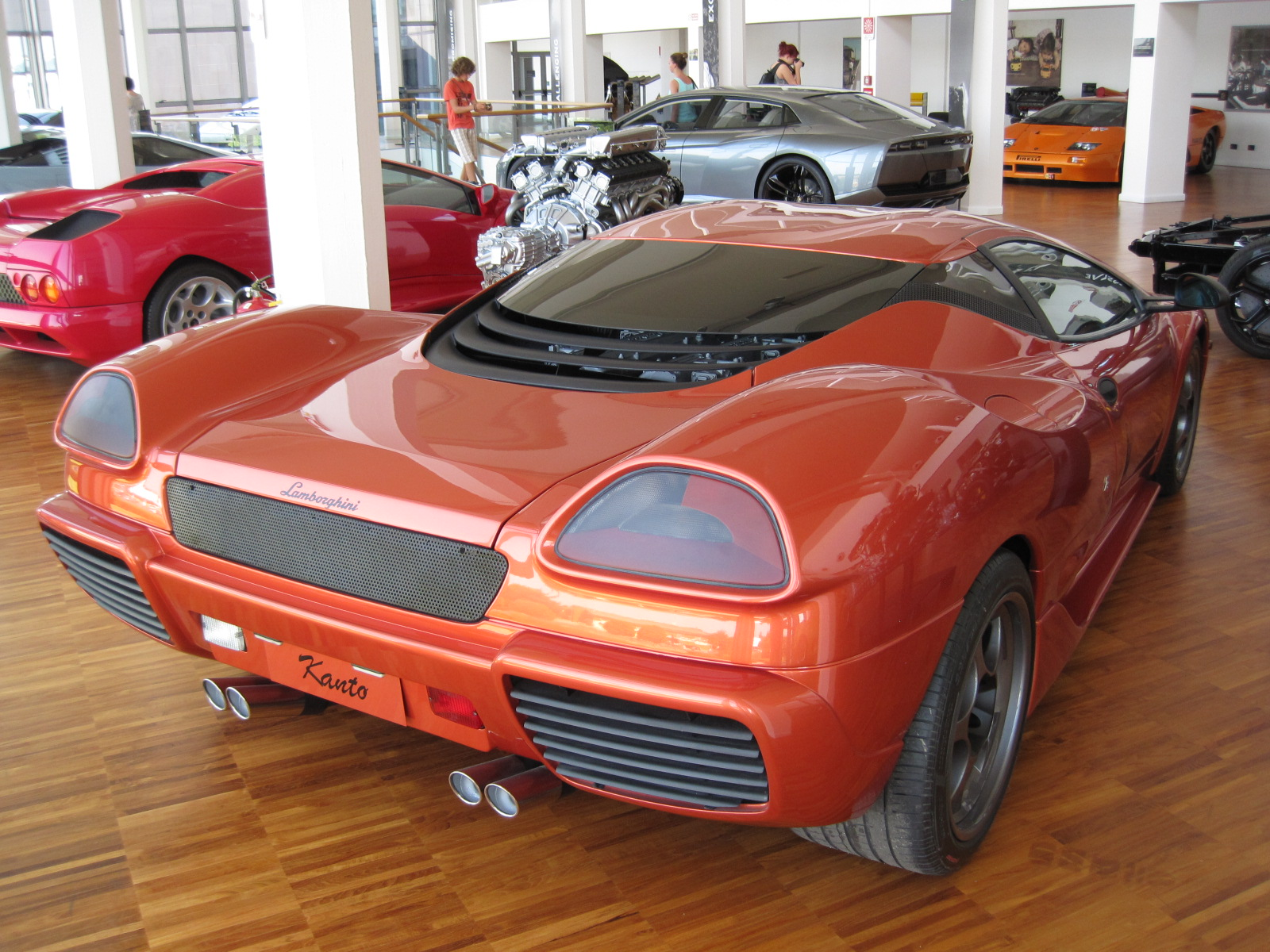
Rear view

After the rejection of Gandini's design, many design propositions were made for the Diablo's successor. Finally, a design penned by Norihiko Harada, chief designer of Italian styling house Zagato, was chosen.

The first running prototypes with Harada's design began testing in 1997. In the early stages of the car's development, the Canto utilised the engine taken from a Diablo SV before moving on to a more powerful and modified power plant. During testing at the Nardò test track in Italy, the Canto is said to have reached a top speed of 350 km/h (217 mph), although this was never officially confirmed.

When Lamborghini was sold to Audi in June 1998, the development work on the successor of the Diablo was overseen by Volkswagen Group president Ferdinand Piëch. He immediately rejected the design because he had been unimpressed by the design language, which was not as aggressive as previous Lamborghini models. He also reprimanded the big side air intakes present on the rear of the car, which disproportioned the overall look.

Keeping the suggestions in consideration, the car was heavily redesigned in 1999, and special attention was given to shorten the air intakes. The car was to be unveiled to the public at the 1999 Geneva Motor Show with plans of putting it into production but the car did not receive Piëch's approval, primarily due to his continuing dissatisfaction with the design along with the use of the Diablo's running gear and the project was shelved.

The Canto had later utilised a modified version of the 6.0-litre V12 engine used in Diablo SV-R, which generated a maximum power output of 640 PS (471 kW; 631 hp) during dyno testing. The engine was detuned to 610 PS (449 kW; 602 hp) for longevity and easy maintenance.

A claimed total of five cars are said to have been produced, with one car (finished in black exterior colour) being sold to a Japanese collector. The Canto concept with the Diablo SV-R powerplant now resides in the Lamborghini Museum.

Following the failure of the two concepts, Piëch initiated development work of the successor of the Diablo from scratch. The design work was entrusted to the then Lamborghini chief designer Luc Donckerwolke, and thus the Murciélago was developed.

== Production ==
Year	Units
1999	252
2000	291
2001	215
