= 1994 Australian Drivers' Championship =

Motor racing competition

Seasons
- ← 1993 1995 →

The 1994 Australian Drivers' Championship was a CAMS sanctioned motor racing competition open to drivers of racing cars complying with CAMS Formula Brabham (formerly known as Formula Holden) regulations. The championship winner was awarded the 1994 CAMS Gold Star as the Australian Champion Driver. It was the 38th running of the Australian Drivers' Championship and the sixth to feature the Formula Holden / Formula Brabham category which had been developed during 1988. The championship began on 17 April 1994 at Eastern Creek Raceway and ended on 28 August at Oran Park Raceway after six rounds.

The championship was won by Birrana Racing's Paul Stokell after a season long duel with Triple Eight Racing driver Greg Murphy. Murphy and his Ralt RT23 was the better combination at the start of the season, winning the first four races. Stokell started the year in a Reynard 90D, moving into the teams newer 91D at the second round. Stokell took his first win at Winton Motor Raceway and won every race bar one for the rest of the season to push past Murphy and win the championship.

Reynard 91D driver Adam Kaplan won the third place on consistency, finishing in the top three at the final race of the season with a second place at Oran Park. Tied for fourth place in the championship was Kevin Weeks (Reynard 91D) and Craig Lowndes . The emerging Formula Ford driver drove the ageing Cheetak Mk.9 owned by Brian Sampson.

== Teams and drivers ==
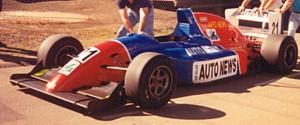
Greg Murphy's Ralt RT23 at the Lakeside round of the championship

The following drivers competed in the 1994 Australian Drivers' Championship.

Driver	No	Car
Allan Galloway	3	Reynard 91D
Ron Barnacle	4	Reynard 90D
Adam Kaplan	7	Reynard 91D
Paul Stokell	9	Reynard 90D; Reynard 91D
Graham Watson	11	SPA 003
Peter Brennan	17	Ralt RT21
Rick Fabri	18	Ralt RT21
Arthur Abrahams	19	Reynard 92D
Greg Murphy	21	Ralt RT23
Chas Jacobsen	24	Reynard 92D
Ross Hodgson	32	Ralt RT21
Bernie Stack	38	Ralt RT21
Craig Lowndes	49; 94	Cheetah Mk. 9
Bob Minogue	64	Lola T87/50
Kevin Weeks	70	Reynard 91D
Stan Keen	73	Shrike NB89H
Chris Hocking	74	Reynard 91D
Paul Collins	88	Liston BF3
Roger Seward	96	Ralt RT23
Albert Callagher	99	Ralt RT21
Colin Milne		Hocking 911

== Results and standings ==
=== Race calendar ===
The 1994 Australian Drivers' Championship consisted of six rounds held in four different states. Each round consisted of two heats. The final round at Oran Park in Sydney used the shorter (1.96 km) South Circuit rather than the 2.6 km Grand Prix Circuit. Results sourced from:

Rd.	Circuit	City / state	Date	Winner
1	Eastern Creek Raceway	Sydney, New South Wales	17 April	Greg Murphy
2	Phillip Island Grand Prix Circuit	Phillip Island, Victoria	22 May	Greg Murphy
3	Winton Motor Raceway	Benalla, Victoria	19 June	Paul Stokell
4	Lakeside Raceway	Brisbane, Queensland	17 July	Paul Stokell
5	Mallala Motor Sport Park	Mallala, South Australia	7 August	Paul Stokell
6	Oran Park Raceway	Sydney, New South Wales	28 August	Paul Stokell

=== Drivers Championship ===
Points were awarded 20–16–14–12–10–8–6–4–2–1 based on the top ten race positions.

Pos	Driver	Rd 1		Rd 2		Rd 3		Rd 4		Rd 5		Rd 6		Pts
1	Paul Stokell	2nd	4th	DNS	2nd	1st	1st	1st	1st	2nd	1st	1st	1st	200
2	Greg Murphy	1st	1st	1st	1st	3rd	2nd	Ret	2nd	1st	2nd	2nd	Ret	178
3	Adam Kaplan	5th	5th	7th	7th	5th	5th	4th	4th	4th	4th	4th	2nd	128
4	Craig Lowndes	Ret	6th	3rd	4th	4th	3rd			3rd	3rd	3rd	3rd	116
4	Kevin Weeks	3rd	2nd	2nd	3rd	2nd	4th	3rd	3rd	Ret	Ret			116
6	Bob Minogue	6th	7th	6th	Ret	8th	8th	5th	5th	6th	6th	8th	7th	76
7	Allan Galloway	4th	3rd	4th	5th	6th	7th			DNS	5th	Ret	DNS	72
8	Chris Hocking			DNS	6th	7th	Ret			5th	DNS	5th	4th	46
9	Graham Watson	8th	8th			9th	9th					6th	6th	28
10	Arthur Abrahams			Ret	DNS	Ret	6th	2nd	Ret					24
11	Bernie Stack	7th	Ret	5th	8th					DNS	10th			21
12	Ron Barnacle											7th	5th	16
13	Peter Brennan	10th	Ret	8th	9th					8th	8th			15
14	Chas Jacobsen									9th	7th			8
14	Stan Keen									7th	9th			8
16	Ross Hodgson	9th	9th											4
17	Rick Fabri	Ret	Ret	9th	10th									3
18	Paul Collins	12th	11th	10th	DNS	10th	Ret							2
19	Al Callegher	11th	10th							Ret	Ret			1
19	Roger Seward									10th	Ret			1
Pos	Driver	Rd 1		Rd 2		Rd 3		Rd 4		Rd 5		Rd 6		Pts

Colour	Result
Gold	Winner
Silver	Second place
Bronze	Third place
Green	Points classification
Blue	Non-points classification
Blue	Non-classified finish (NC)
Purple	Retired, not classified (Ret)
Red	Did not qualify (DNQ)
Red	Did not pre-qualify (DNPQ)
Black	Disqualified (DSQ)
White	Did not start (DNS)
White	Withdrew (WD)
White	Race cancelled (C)
Blank	Did not practice (DNP)
Blank	Did not arrive (DNA)
Blank	Excluded (EX)
