= 2009 Australian Mini Challenge =

The 2009 Australian Mini Challenge delivered by Pizza Capers was the second running of the one make championship. It began on 26 March at the Melbourne Grand Prix Circuit and ended on 2 December at the new Homebush Street Circuit. A winner of two rounds during the season, Paul Stokell won the championship ahead of Chris Alajajian, who remained in title contention despite not winning any of the series' eight rounds.

== Teams and drivers ==
The following teams and drivers contested the 2009 Australian Mini Challenge.

Team	No	Drivers
Doulman Automotive	1	Grant Doulman; Robert Jones
	3	John Magro
Donut King Racing	5	Barrie Nesbitt
Donut King Racing	12	Tony Alford
Donut King Racing	14	Peter Leemhuis
Stillwell Mini Garage	6	David Stillwell; Ant Pedersen; Helen Linder
Stillwell Mini Garage	8	Gary Young; Bill Fulton; Geoff Emery; Scott Manson; Tom Pickett
Sherrin Rentals	7	Grant Sherrin
Sherrin Rentals	72	Iain Sherrin
BMW Group Australia (BMW Uber Star)	9	Chris Alajajian; Paul Morris
BMW Group Australia (BMW Uber Star)	16	Nathan Geier; Andrew Fisher; John Martin; Chris Reindler; Karl Reindler
BMW Group Australia (BMW Uber Star)	19	Nathan Callaghan
BMW Group Australia (BMW Uber Star)	24	Matt Mackelden; Ryan Hansford; Vaughan Brewer; Glenn Seton
BMW Group Australia (BMW Uber Star)	25	Sam Newman
BMW Group Australia (BMW Uber Star)	50	Steven Bradbury; Chris Atkinson; Steve Owen; James Tomkins; Robbie Maddison; Glenn Seton; Guy Andrews; Leanne Tander; David Brabham
Glory Team Racing	10	Nathan Caratti; Aaron Caratti
Motorline Mini Garage	22	Andrew Mill; Jonathon Webb; Todd Wanless
Motorline Mini Garage	43	Brendan Cook; Paul Fiore
Bruce Lynton BMW	23; 80	Beric Lynton
Prosurv	26	John Modystach
Decorug Racing	27	Paul Stokell
Decorug Racing	95	Grant Denyer; Warren Luff
Bargwanna Motorsport	79	Scott Bargwanna
Bargwanna Motorsport	97	Brendon Cook
East Coast Traffic Control	88	Wayne Miles
Livi bathroom Tissues	91	Damien Flack
Rock Energy Drink	98	Sean Carter

== Calendar ==
The 2009 Australian Mini Challenge delivered by Pizza Capers was contested over eight rounds, starting at Albert Park in March and finishing at Homebush in December

Rd.	Supporting	Circuit	City / State	Date	Winner
1	AGP	Melbourne Grand Prix Circuit	Melbourne	26–29 Mar	Paul Stokell
2	V8SCS 4	Symmons Plains Raceway	Launceston, Tasmania	29–31 May	Grant Denyer
3 *	V8SCS 6	Townsville Street Circuit	Townsville, Queensland	10–12 Jul	Paul Stokell
4	V8SCS 7	Sandown International Raceway	Melbourne, Victoria	1–2 Aug	Grant Denyer
5	V8SCS 9	Phillip Island Grand Prix Circuit	Phillip Island, Victoria	11–13 Sep	Grant Denyer
6	V8SCS 11	Surfers Paradise Street Circuit	Surfers Paradise, Queensland	9–12 Oct	Paul Stokell
7 *	V8SCS 13	Barbagallo Raceway	Perth, Western Australia	7–8 Nov	Nathan Caratti
8	V8SCS 14	Homebush Street Circuit	Sydney	4–6 Dec	Glenn Seton

- V8SCS – V8 Supercar Championship Series
- AGP – Australian Grand Prix
- * 2 driver race (optional)

== Driver standings ==
Pos	Driver	Rd 1	Rd 2	Rd 3	Rd 4	Rd 5	Rd 6	Rd 7	Rd 8	Pts
1	Paul Stokell	144	156	168	102	24	168	150	54	966
2	Chris Alajajian	78	129	138	DNS	123	150	138	162	918
3	Scott Bargwanna	75	132	84	90	114	114	108	156	873
4	Nathan Caratti	51	30	126	60	120	90	168	120	765
5	Grant Denyer	51	162	105	114	135	27	108	51	753
6	Beric Lynton	82.5		21		108	90		90	391.5
7	Brendon Cook	19.5	81	57	39	57	48	54	21	376.5
8	John Modystach	16.5	69	39	27	84	36	60	27	358.5
9	Grant Sherrin			57	54		60		63	234
10	Sean Carter						66	90	45	201
11	Brendan Cook	DNS	48	30	12	51	12	33	12	198
12	David Stillwell		66	60					69	195
13	Aaron Caratti			126				51		177
14	Geoff Emery			102	66					177
15	Glenn Seton								162	162
16	Paul Morris			138						138
17	Ryan Hansford						129			129
18	Gary Young	129								129
19	Robert Jones					126				126
20	Jonathon Webb		114							114
21	Warren Luff			105						105
22	Grant Doulman	45							54	99
23	Chris Reindler							96		96
23	Karl Reindler							96		96
25	Scott Manson					93				93
26	Bill Fulton		78							78
27	John Magro				72					72
28	Nathan Geier	69								69
29	Nathan Callaghan	67.5								67.5
30	Anthony Pedersen			63						63
30	Paul Fiore			30				33		63
32	Steven Bradbury		57							57
32	Matt Mackelden			57		DNS				57
34	Andrew Mill	55.5								55.5
35	Iain Sherrin						33		18	51
36	John Martin						48			48
37	Damien Flack	45								45
38	Peter Leemhuis	42								42
38	Tom Pickett						42			42
40	Andrew Fisher				39					39
41	Wayne Miles						12	9	15	36
42	Vaughan Brewer							30		30
43	Barrie Nesbitt	22.5								22.5
44	Todd Wanless			18						18
45	Tony Bates				9					9
46	Helen Lindner	7.5								7.5
46	Tony Alford	7.5								7.5
48	Wayne Lamont				6					6
Pos	Driver	Rd 1	Rd 2	Rd 3	Rd 4	Rd 5	Rd 6	Rd 7	Rd 8	Pts

Colour	Result
Gold	Winner
Silver	Second place
Bronze	Third place
Green	Points finish
Blue	Non-points finish
Blue	Non-classified finish (NC)
Purple	Retired (Ret)
Red	Did not qualify (DNQ)
Red	Did not pre-qualify (DNPQ)
Black	Disqualified (DSQ)
White	Did not start (DNS)
White	Withdrew (WD)
White	Race cancelled (C)
Blank	Did not practice (DNP)
Blank	Did not arrive (DNA)
Blank	Excluded (EX)
