= Sam Newman =

Australian rules football player

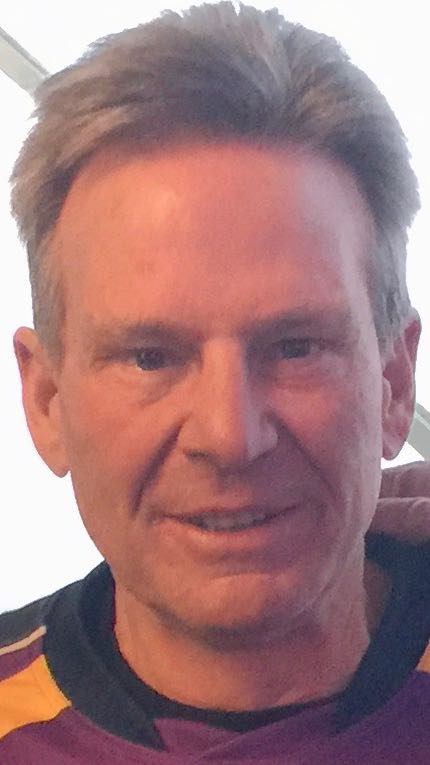

Personal information
- Full name: John Noel William Newman
- Nicknames: Sam, Fossil, Foss, Sammy
- Born: 22 December 1945 (age 80); Geelong, Victoria
- Original team: Geelong Grammar School
- Height: 189 cm (6 ft 2 in)
- Weight: 94 kg (207 lb)
- Positions: Ruck, forward

Playing career^{1}
Years	Club	Games (Goals)
1964–1980	Geelong	300 (110)

Representative team honours
Years	Team	Games (Goals)
	Victoria	8 (?)
- ^{1} Playing statistics correct to the end of 1980.

Career highlights
- Club: 2× Carji Greeves Medal: (1968, 1975); Geelong captain: (1974–1975); Geelong Team of the Century; Geelong Hall of Fame; Representative: 2× National Football Carnival Championship: 1969, 1975; All-Australian team: (1969); Overall: Australian Football Hall of Fame, inducted 2002

John Noel William "Sam" Newman (born 22 December 1945) is a former Australian rules footballer who played for the Geelong Football Club in the Victorian Football League (VFL).

He apprenticed under Graham "Polly" Farmer, and became Geelong's main ruckman after Farmer departed at the end of 1967. He overcame a number of serious injuries during his career to become the first Geelong player to reach 300 senior VFL games.

After retiring in 1980, Newman served as a specialist ruck coach at various AFL clubs and had a notable media career, particularly with Melbourne-based radio station 3AW and the Nine Network as a panel member of The Footy Show, one of the network's most popular and often controversial programs.

== Early life ==
Newman attended Geelong Grammar School, where his father was a teacher.

He made his debut for Geelong in 1964 when he was 18 years old. Early in his time at Geelong he acquired the nickname "Sam", by which he is now usually known.

== Football career ==
After playing five reserves games for Geelong at the end of 1963, Newman was selected for his senior debut in Round 3 of the 1964 VFL season against Fitzroy at Brunswick Street Oval. During the first semi-final against Collingwood in 1967, Newman suffered a serious injury which forced surgeons to remove part of his kidney. He was also selected as an All-Australian player in 1969. He played for the Victorian state team eight times.

the 1980 season was Newman's last as a VFL footballer. In Round 4 against North Melbourne at Arden Street Oval, he kicked five goals playing as centre half-forward, four of those in the last quarter, in a 37-point win. Geelong coach Bill Goggin praised his former teammate after the match: "He is such an inspiration to the players. They have told me that just having him out there with them gives everyone a lift". Newman reached his 300th senior VFL game in Round 20 against Collingwood at Kardinia Park. Although he had a quiet game, the Cats achieved an 18-point win. As a point of note, sometime after the end of Newman's playing career, certain games were not recognised as official VFL/AFL matches and hence were removed from players' game tallies.

In 2002, he was inducted into the Australian Football Hall of Fame.

In December 2005, Newman was appointed as ruck coach for the Melbourne Football Club to mentor players such as Jeff White, Mark Jamar and Paul Johnson.

On 6 July 2010, Newman played in a charity match playing for Victoria in the annual E. J. Whitten Legends Game. He kicked four goals from four kicks and took three marks to be named best on ground, despite his team losing to the All Stars by seven points.

== Media career ==
Newman joined radio station 3AW as a football commentator in 1981 and continued with the station until the end of the 1999 season. He also appeared on World of Sport on Channel 7 for seven years from 1981 to 1987 and had a column in The Sun News-Pictorial newspaper during the late 1980s.

Newman joined the Nine Network in 1989, appearing on a sports segment on In Melbourne Today with Ernie Sigley and Denise Drysdale. In 1992 he was a reporter on Melbourne Extra, a short-lived local current affairs show. He was a panel member of The Sunday Footy Show from 1993 to 1998.

Newman was on The Footy Show (the Melbourne-based version covering the AFL) on the Nine Network from when it first aired in 1994 until 2018. He also appeared on the Sunday sports show Any Given Sunday in 2005, and co-hosted the short lived Sam and The Fatman with Paul Vautin. On the radio station Triple M Melbourne, Newman previewed Friday night and Saturday afternoon matches. He formerly provided special comments during AFL games on Triple M, as well as 3AW. From April 2010, he was part of the Melbourne Talk Radio line-up, providing opinion and participating in talkback between 9.00 am and 9.30 am, during the Steve Price breakfast programme. Newman quit the station in January 2012, after the programme's producer censored Newman's profanity.

In February 2018, he started a podcast with former Herald Sun chief football writer Mike Sheahan and former St Kilda coach Grant Thomas, entitled Sam, Mike and Thomo. The podcast aired once weekly and covered all trending topics, with some AFL commentary. In March 2019 it was announced by Newman on social media that the podcast would be discontinued, as he was perceived to make fun of transgender people on a prior episode of the podcast. However, in August he revived the podcast, starring Sheahan and former VFL footballer Don Scott, entitled Sam, Mike & Don, You Cannot Be Serious. It aired with this name until June 2020, when Sheahan quit for a second time due to the fallout from comments made by Scott about former AFL footballer Nicky Winmar. It was then renamed to You Cannot Be Serious.

In December 2018, Eddie McGuire announced that Newman had signed a new multi-year deal with Nine; however, The Footy Show, on which Newman had been appearing with McGuire since the show started in March 1994, was replaced by a football show in a new format in 2019. Newman and McGuire were meant to host four Footy Show "specials" in 2019, but upon it being announced in May 2019 that The Footy Show would no longer be aired, this was cancelled.

In June 2020, Newman announced that he would no longer appear on the Nine Network.

In March 2023, Sam Newman announced on the You Cannot Be Serious podcast with Don Scott that their podcast had reached 10 million downloads on Podbean.

== Controversies ==
Newman has regularly been a controversial figure during his media career; some of his most controversial incidents on The Footy Show include:

- Wearing blackface to impersonate Indigenous AFL footballer Nicky Winmar in 1999, after Winmar did not attend a scheduled appearance on the program
- Getting his trousers and underwear pulled down by AFL footballer Shane Crawford live on-air in 2001 with no warning, then not having the presence of mind to cover his exposed genitalia
- Hitting an unsuspecting David Schwarz with a pie in the face during an appearance on The Footy Show, with Schwarz responding by shoving Newman to the ground
- Manhandling and groping a lingerie-clad mannequin with an image of journalist Caroline Wilson's face attached to it in 2008, in response to the way Wilson was dressed on Footy Classified. Newman was suspended by the Nine Network after the incident
- Describing five female directors of AFL clubs as "liars and hypocrites" after they complained about Newman's mannequin skit, leading one of those directors, Susan Alberti, to sue the Nine Network for $220,000
- Smoking a bong on-air in 2012 after the AFL banned marijuana as a game-day substance; the substance in the bong was later revealed to be tea leaves
- In 2013, following the Adam Goodes booing saga involving him asking for a girl to be ejected for racial abuse for calling him an ape and his traditional spear-throwing celebration later on in response to crowd hostility, Newman defended the rights of fans to continue booing as a show of disapproval for Goodes' actions, including a perception that his approach in dealing with the Collingwood fan who called him an ape was heavy-handed. Newman, after the subsequent spear-throwing celebration, said on The Footy Show:
  From one Australian to another Australian – I’m an Australian so is Adam Goodes – Adam you’re not important as you think you are and you take yourself far too seriously.
  If you’re going to provoke people by the gesture of spear-throwing at a crowd, you better not be surprised if you get what you wish for and that’s a reaction.
  Unfortunately you’re not well-enough equipped to deal with fracas and the saga that you’ve caused. You’re just not capable of dealing with it, hence the fact you’ve gone into hiding, you’re not playing anymore.
  It is on you as an Australian of the Year to unite and placate people, not to divide and be a provocateur.
  How about the condescending nature of people who say if you’re an AFL fan and you go to the football and you boo Adam Goodes you’re a racist. How gratuitously stupid is that? I would suggest that the people boo Adam Goodes because he has turned their game into a political forum and people go to the football to get away from everything as a release, as an outlet and they don’t want to have to put up with a political statement.

In 2019, Newman tweeted, "Criticizing someone from another race - doesn’t make you a racist. The groveling doco by Sharkshit [sic] Productions [(Shark Island Productions)] ‘The Final Quarter’, should be ‘The Last Straw’. Adam Goodes initially was booed for taunting Carlton fans. Racist? So be it. #racism #fakenews" In 2023, Newman also commented regarding the historical booing of Adam Goodes from a decade prior, saying: "Adam Goodes was booed because he pretended to throw a spear at the Carlton cheer squad after the Swans were beating them by 10 goals at half-time and wondered why people, people get booed on the football field, not because of their skin colour, but because of things they do."

- Describing National Football League (NFL) draftee Michael Sam as "annoyingly gratuitous" in 2014 after the openly homosexual player kissed his boyfriend on live television in the US on being drafted to the NFL
- Making remarks about Mitch Clark's depression issues in 2015
- Referring to transgender celebrity Caitlyn Jenner as "he" and "it" in 2017
- Staging a silent protest and refusing to speak throughout an episode in 2017 after producers refused to allow him to dress up as a woman in response to two senior AFL executives being exposed as having had affairs with junior staffers; the Nine Network responded by taking The Footy Show off air for four weeks, sacking Craig Hutchison as host, and replacing him with Eddie McGuire
- Ranting about the AFL Commission's decision to publicly support the "yes vote" in the Australian Marriage Law Postal Survey, which would pave the way for legalising same-sex marriage

In June 2020, Newman arrived at a mutual agreement with the Nine Network to resign from the network after he stated in a podcast that while George Floyd died as a consequence of police brutality, Floyd's extensive criminal record meant he was a "piece of shit".

The following week, Newman engaged in a conversation with Don Scott and Mike Sheahan on the podcast in which they expressed doubt that Nicky Winmar's famous jumper raise in 1993 was about Winmar responding to racism, with Scott and Sheahan instead suggesting that they believed it was to signify a "gutsy" effort. Winmar and photographer Wayne Ludbey took legal action against Newman, Scott and Sheahan, alleging defamation, with the parties reaching an agreement during mediation involving a formal apology and an undisclosed donation to an Indigenous charity. Newman later said in an interview with sports journalist Tony Jones that the fine/donation amounted to $100,000, which had previously been reported by The Guardian.

Newman's controversies continued even after being sacked from the Nine Network.

- In November 2020, Newman described the newly elected U.S. President Joe Biden as "mentally retarded and has special needs" on Twitter.
- On a podcast episode from 27 July 2023, Newman stated that anyone voting for the "Yes" vote regarding the Indigenous Voice to Parliament should be embarrassed. He commented, "I don't think there's a hell of a lot of Indigenous history to learn... They don't have a history."
- In September 2023, in the weeks leading up to the 2023 AFL Grand Final, Newman encouraged his podcast listeners to boo or sarcastically slow-clap in response to the "Welcome to Country", a ceremony usually undertaken by Indigenous representatives during significant public occasions, calling it "irrelevant" and "unnecessary". Newman's comments were widely condemned by the broader community, including AFL CEO Gillon McLachlan and Victorian Premier Daniel Andrews, and the preliminary finals matches held in the immediate wake of Newman's comments saw the Welcome to Country ceremonies enthusiastically embraced by stadium audiences in a rebuke to Newman's plea. Newman would later claim in an interview that this call was "provocative" and "tongue-in-cheek" and, when pressed, implied that he himself would not boo the Welcome to Country. Newman's calls to action (such as calls to boo Welcome to Country and his fallacious comments on Winmar) have been considered as racist and a form of dog-whistling.
- In February 2025, Newman created a podcast episode with Blair Cottrell and Thomas Sewell, two neo-Nazi figures in Australia.

== Motorsport ==
Newman had a brief career in motor racing. He began racing in 1998 in Class C of the Australian GT Production Car Championship, where he finished in 10th place in a Ford EL Falcon XR8. In the 1999 Australian GT Production Car Championship he raced a Holden Vectra GL to third place in Class D driving for Gibson Motorsport. He then went on to finish in fourth place in Class D at the 1999 Poolrite GTP Bathurst Showroom Showdown driving with Melinda Price. He drove the Vectra to fifth place in Class E in the 2000 Australian GT Production Car Championship. He also raced a V8 Supercar at the support races at the Australian Grand Prix in the same year. Running a Gibson Motorsport prepared VS Commodore, he finished 25th, 24th and 23rd in the three races across the weekend.

In 2001, Newman raced a Ferrari 360 Challenge for Prancing Horse Racing as a teammate to multiple Australian champions (in various categories) and Bathurst 1000 winner John Bowe in the 2001 Australian Nations Cup Championship, finishing in 14th place. In the 2002 Championship, Newman acquitted himself well and improved to finish 10th in the series

Newman's brightest moment in motor racing was when he put his Ferrari on pole position for the 2002 Sandown 500. Newman benefited in the Top 10 shootout for pole as he was the first driver on the track. Before the next driver went out, the rain came down and Newman ended up over 6 seconds faster than the 2nd placed Porsche 996 GT3 of racing legend Jim Richards. Newman and co-driver Scott Shearman went on to finish the race 6th outright.

With PHR Scuderia selling the 360 Challenge to Mark Coffey Racing at the end of 2002, Newman defected to Team Lamborghini for the 2003 Australian Nations Cup Championship and, driving the V12 Lamborghini Diablo SVR and GTR models. He started the season in the later model GTR in Nations Cup Group 1 as team mate to another multiple Australian racing champion, Paul Stokell (who would win the 2002 NC title), but was bumped to the older Group 2 Diablo SVR when V8 Supercars driver Anthony Tratt re-joined the team from Round 3 at Wakefield Park and, being a professional driver, was given the newer, faster car. Despite troubles, mostly in the SVR, Newman improved to finish 7th outright in the championship. He finished the series in 9th place in Group 1 and 3rd place in Group 2. Although he drove a full season for Team Lamborghini in 2003 and Tratt had left the team to concentrate on his other racing, Newman wasn't given a drive in the 2003 Bathurst 24 Hour, as the team only entered one car and signed race drivers Luke Youlden, Peter Hackett and highly rated Danish driver Allan Simonsen to join Stokell for the race.

After leaving motor racing at the end of 2003, Newman would again race in the 2009 and 2010 Mini Challenge Australia championships, both times at the Albert Park round in the Uber Star Celebrity Car.

=== Career results ===
Results sources from:

Season	Series	Position	Car	Team
1998	Australian GT Production Car Championship Class C	10th	Ford EL Falcon XR8	Ross Palmer Motorsport
1999	Australian GT Production Car Championship Class D	3rd	Holden Vectra GL	Gibson Motorsport
2000	Australian GT Production Car Championship Class E	4th	Holden Vectra GL	Gibson Motorsport
2001	Australian Nations Cup Championship	14th	Ferrari 360 Challenge	Prancing Horse Scuderia
2002	Australian Nations Cup Championship	10th	Ferrari 360 Challenge	Prancing Horse Scuderia
2002	Australian Nations Cup Championship Group 2	2nd	Ferrari 360 Challenge	Prancing Horse Scuderia
2003	Australian Nations Cup Championship	7th	Lamborghini Diablo SVR; Lamborghini Diablo GTR	Team Lamborghini Australia
2003	Australian Nations Cup Championship Group 1	9th	Lamborghini Diablo GTR	Team Lamborghini Australia
2003	Australian Nations Cup Championship Group 2	3rd	Lamborghini Diablo SVR	Team Lamborghini Australia
2010	Mini Challenge Australia	31st	Mini Cooper S	BMW Australia

== Personal life ==
Newman lives in Docklands, Melbourne. In 2002, he released a compilation album entitled I Do My Best Work After Midnight, consisting of 13 selections from other artists, as well as two songs sung by himself: "Witchcraft" and "I've Got You Under My Skin". In 2008, he was treated for prostate cancer, and he allowed Channel Nine's program 60 Minutes to film the operation. Following the operation, he was cleared of the cancer.

He has been married four times. His last wife, Amanda Brown, died aged 50 in May 2021 despite Newman trying to revive her using CPR for 20–30 minutes. The two had been together for 20 years, only marrying in late 2020, about six months before her death. Newman recorded an emotional tribute to his late wife on his podcast You Cannot Be Serious.
