= 2004 Australian Nations Cup Championship =

The 2004 Australian Nations Cup Championship was an Australian motor racing competition for modified production-based coupes complying with "Nations Cup" regulations. Contested as part of the 2004 Procar Championship Series, it was sanctioned by the Confederation of Australian Motor Sport as a National Championship with PROCAR Australia Pty Ltd appointed as the Category Manager.

The championship, which was the fifth Australian Nations Cup Championship, was won by defending champion Paul Stokell driving a Lamborghini Diablo GTR. Finishing second was Nathan Pretty driving a Holden Monaro 427C with David Stevens third in his turbocharged Porsche 911 GT2.

The 2004 championship was eagerly awaited by fans of the category. Although it had lost John Bowe and his Ferrari 360 N-GT, popular young Danish driver Allan Simonsen would drive an ex-ALMS Ferrari 550 GT2 in selected rounds (as well as racing a Ferrari 360 Challenge in the Trophy Class) for Mark Coffey Racing while David Stevens introduced the 911 GT2. 59 year old Australian racing legend Peter Brock, after racing a Monaro for Garry Rogers Motorsport in 2003, left to form his own team (with Monaros supplied by GRM) with himself and oldest son James Brock doing the driving. GRM themselves would continue with Pretty driving the #427 Monaro as well as servicing the Team Brock cars between rounds. Ian Palmer, the brother of series founder Ross Palmer, raced a Honda NSX Brabham and also Peter Brock's Monaro for a number of races. Team Lamborghini Australia returned to defend their crown with Stokell driving the V12 Lamborghini Diablo and he was joined by Formula 3 driver Peter Hackett in a second Diablo GTR.

Following the 2004 championship, PROCAR shut down the Nations Cup championship citing financial difficulties (this also saw the cancellation of the 2004 Bathurst 24 Hour). From 2005 CAMS would revive the Australian GT Championship with the Nations Cup cars (with the exception of the Monaros) eligible to race in that series.

== Schedule ==
The championship was contested over a seven round series with three races per round.

Round	Circuit	State	Date	Race winners	Round winner	Car	Report
1	Adelaide Street Circuit	South Australia	20–21 March	R1 - Paul Stokell; R2 - Paul Stokell; R3 - Allan Simonsen	Paul Stokell	Lamborghini Diablo GTR	
2	Oran Park Raceway	New South Wales	17–18 April	R1 - Paul Stokell; R2 - Nathan Pretty; R3 - Nathan Pretty	Nathan Pretty	Holden Monaro 427C	
3	Sandown Raceway	Victoria	15–16 May	R1 - Paul Stokell; R2 - Paul Stokell; R3 - Nathan Pretty	Paul Stokell	Lamborghini Diablo GTR	
4	Winton Motor Raceway	Victoria	20 June	R1 - Paul Stokell; R2 - Nathan Pretty; R3 - Nathan Pretty	Nathan Pretty	Holden Monaro 427C	
5	Eastern Creek Raceway	New South Wales	18 July	R1 - Paul Stokell; R2 - Paul Stokell; R3 - Paul Stokell	Paul Stokell	Lamborghini Diablo GTR	
6	Wakefield Park	New South Wales	8 August	R1 - Paul Stokell; R2 - Nathan Pretty; R3 - Paul Stokell	Paul Stokell	Lamborghini Diablo GTR	
7	Mallala Motor Sport Park	South Australia	19 September	R1 - Paul Stokell; R2 - Paul Stokell; R3 - James Brock	James Brock	Holden Monaro 427C	

== Classes ==
Cars competing in two classes, GT Class and Trophy Class, classified according to potential vehicle performance.

== Points system ==
Championship points were awarded in each class on a 30-24-20-18-17-16-15-14-13-12-11-10-9-8-7-6-5-4-3-2-1 basis to the top twenty one class placegetters in each race. 3 bonus points were awarded to the driver achieving pole position in each class during qualifying at each round.

Cars from a separate series, the Porsche Drivers Challenge, were invited to compete with the Nations Cup cars at selected rounds however the drivers were not eligible for championship points.

== Championship results ==
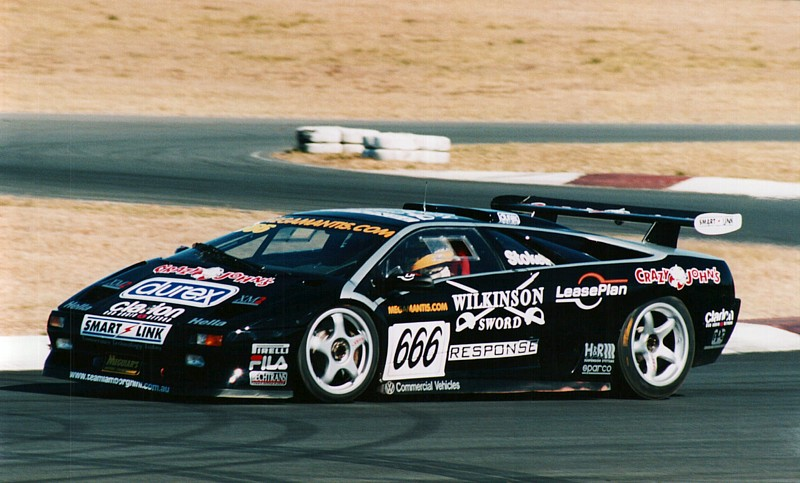
Paul Stokell won the title driving a Lamborghini Diablo GTR. He is pictured above driving a Lamborghini Diablo SVR in the 2001 Australian Nations Cup Championship

Position	Driver	No.	Car	Entrant	Points
GT Class
1	Paul Stokell	1	Lamborghini Diablo GTR	Team Lamborghini Australia	572
2	Nathan Pretty	427	Holden Monaro 427C	Garry Rogers Motorsport	415
3	David Stevens	9	Porsche 911 GT2	Brennan IT / Securetel	309
4	James Brock	22	Holden Monaro 427C	Poolrite	238
5	Ian Palmer	50	Holden Monaro 427C / Honda NSX / Brabham	Ian Palmer	178.5
6	Peter Brock	05	Holden Monaro 427C	Poolrite	156
7	Allan Simonsen	888	Ferrari 550 Millennio	Coopers	119
8	D'arcy Russell	7	Chrysler Viper GTR ACR	DRR	79.5
9	Mark Eddy	30	Porsche 911 GT3 R	Mark Eddy	66
10	Peter Hackett	2	Lamborghini Diablo GTR	Clarion / Penrite	38
Trophy Class
1	John Teulan	54	Ferrari 360 Challenge	Industry Central	312
2	Theo Koundouris	33	Porsche 911 GT3 Clubsport; Porsche 911 GT3 Carrera; Porsche 911 GT3 Carrera Cup	Supabarn Emporium	291
3	Allan Simonsen	888	Ferrari 360 Challenge	Consolidated Chemical Co	279
4	James Koundouris	88	Ferrari 360 Challenge; Porsche 911 GT3 Carrera Cup	Mark Coffey Racing	266
5	Marc Cini	12	Porsche 911 GT3 Carrera	Marc Cini	106
6	Paul Blackie	24	Porsche 911 GT3 Clubsport	Pro-Floor	97
7	Stephen Borness	24	Porsche 911 GT3 Carrera	Ross Palmer Motorsport	93
8	Rod Wilson	11	Ferrari 360 Challenge	Pirelli	81
8	Matthew Turnbull	13	Porsche 911 GT3 Clubsport	Fire Rating Solution / Promat	81
10	Anthony Skinner	126	Porsche 911 GT3 Clubsport	Team Mongrel	64
11	Ted Huglin	110	Ferrari 360 Challenge	Consolidated Chemical Co	60
11	Perry Spiridis	28	Porsche 911 GT3 Carrera	ADAMCO	60
13	Dean Koutsoumidis	71	Porsche 911 GT3 Clubsport	Equity-One Finance	48
14	Geoff Munday	10	Ford Mustang Cobra R	NMR Motorsport	46
15	Murray Carter	18	Chevrolet Corvette C5	Murray Carter	36
16	Carol Jackson	28	Maserati Trofeo	Team Mongrel	30
