= Sydney Motorsport Park =

Motorsport track in New South Wales, Australia

"The Home of Australian Motorsport"
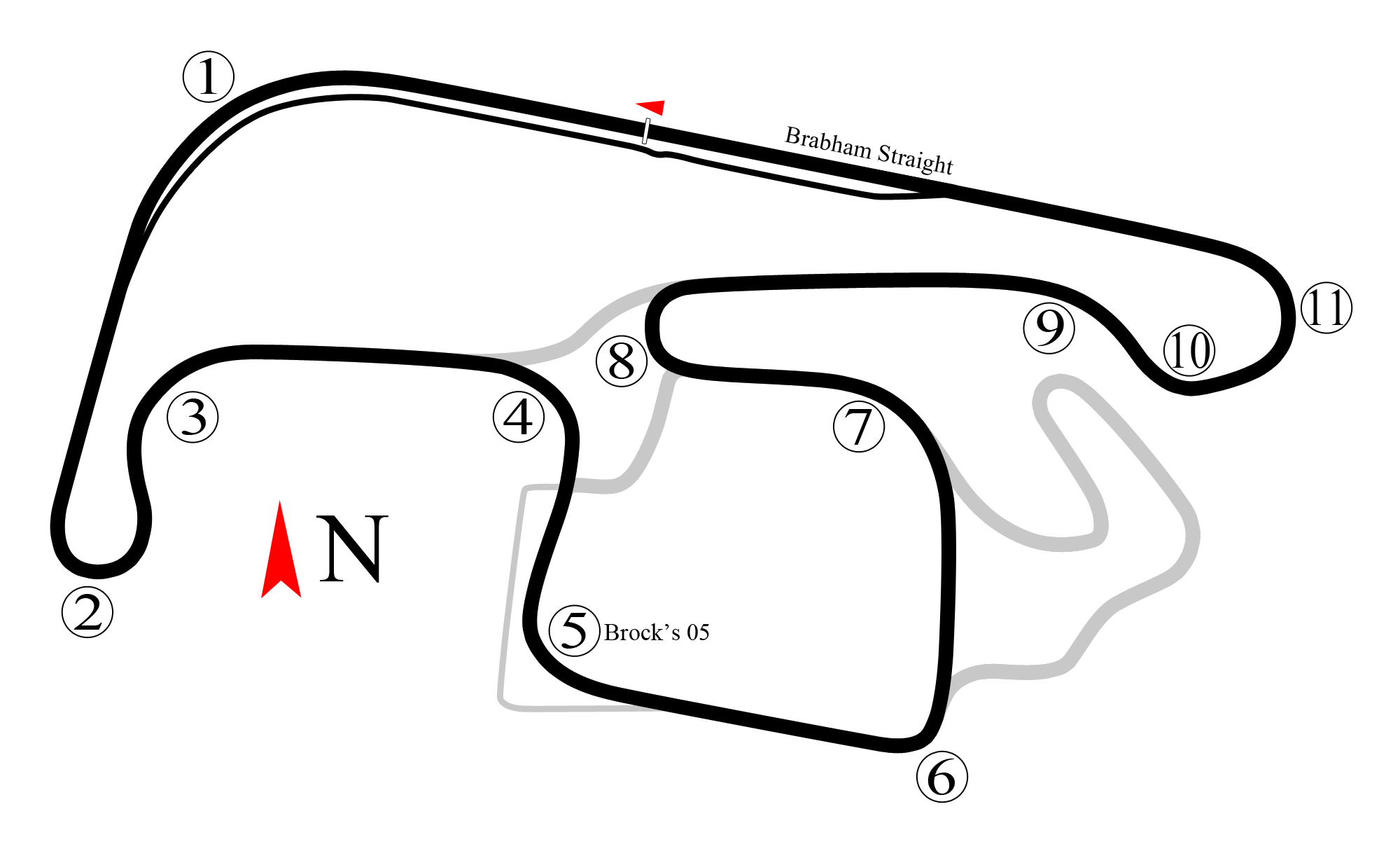
- Gardner Grand Prix Circuit (2012–present)
- Location: Eastern Creek, New South Wales
- Coordinates: 33°48′15″S 150°52′14″E
- FIA Grade: 2 (3 layouts)
- Operator: Australian Racing Drivers Club
- Broke ground: 1989
- Opened: 10 November 1990; 36 years ago
- Former names: Eastern Creek International Raceway (November 1990–May 2012)
- Major events: Current: Supercars Championship; Sydney 500 (1992–1997, 1999–2005, 2007–2008, 2012, 2014–2018, 2020–present); Grand Finale (2003–2004); GT World Challenge Australia (2005–2015, 2018, 2020, 2023–present); Former: Grand Prix motorcycle racing Australian motorcycle Grand Prix (1991–1996); Lamborghini Super Trofeo Asia (2025); TCR Australia (2019, 2021–2024); TCR World Tour (2023); S5000 (2021–2023); S5000 Tasman Series (2021); A1 Grand Prix (2005, 2007–2008)
- Website: http://www.sydneymotorsportpark.com.au

Gardner Grand Prix Circuit (2012–present)
- Length: 3.910 km (2.430 mi)
- Turns: 11
- Race lap record: 1:17.444 ( (Australia) Barton Mawer, Porsche 968, 2024, World Time Attack Challenge)

Brabham Extended Circuit (2012–present)
- Length: 4.500 km (2.796 mi)
- Turns: 18
- Race lap record: 1:48.4905 ( (Australia) Nathan Gotch, Dallara F307, 2016, F3)

Druitt North Circuit (2012–present)
- Length: 2.800 km (1.740 mi)
- Turns: 8
- Race lap record: 0:58.7580 ( (Australia) Adam Proctor, Stohr WF1, 2012, Sports car racing)

Amaroo South Circuit (2012–present)
- Length: 1.800 km (1.118 mi)
- Turns: 13
- Race lap record: 0:52.1357 ( (Australia) Dean Tighe, Dallara-Judd, 2019, Sports car racing)

Original Grand Prix Circuit (1990–2011)
- Length: 3.930 km (2.442 mi)
- Turns: 11
- Race lap record: 1:19.1420 ( (Germany) Nico Hülkenberg, Lola A1GP, 2007, A1GP)

Original Druitt North Circuit (1990–2011)
- Length: 2.800 km (1.740 mi)
- Turns: 10
- Race lap record: 1:00.974 ( (Australia) Craig Lowndes, Holden VR Commodore, 1996, Group 3A)

Sydney Motorsport Park (known until May 2012 as Eastern Creek International Raceway) is a motorsport circuit located on Brabham Drive, Eastern Creek, 40 km (25 mi) west of the Sydney CBD, New South Wales, Australia, adjacent to the Western Sydney International Dragway. It was built and is owned by the New South Wales Government and is operated by the Australian Racing Drivers Club.

== History ==
The development of circuit was approved in 1989 and construction began soon after. However, construction was delayed by poor weather and debates over land ownership. A test race open to Superbikes was held in July 1990 and the circuit was officially opened by then-New South Wales Minister for Sport Bob Rowland-Smith on 10 November 1990 with the running of the Nissan Sydney 500 endurance race for Group A touring cars. In 1991, the consortium formed to fund the circuit suffered financial problems and the complex was purchased by the New South Wales Government. The pit facilities provide fifty garages with direct access to the paddock area and a covered 4,000-seat grandstand overlooks the finish line, providing a view of the majority of the circuit. Events are held at the circuit on most weekends during the year and the circuit is licensed for both cars and motorbikes.

=== Redevelopment ===
On 11 August 2006, the Sydney Morning Herald reported that Ron Dickson, the A1 Grand Prix circuit designer who also designed the Surfers Paradise Street Circuit, suggested that Sydney Motorsport Park was not up to modern standards and needed to be upgraded. On 28 April 2008, it was announced that Apex Circuit Design Ltd. had been commissioned to perform a $350,000 feasibility study on upgrading the track to suit more purposes and hold larger events such as the Australian Formula One Grand Prix, however nothing came of this proposed upgrade.

In early 2011, the circuit received funding for a $9 million upgrade, with the New South Wales Government providing $7 million and the Australian Racing Drivers Club funding the other $2 million. The upgrade reconfigured the circuit into four layouts, with two able to be operated at the same time, with a total length of 4.500 km (2.796 mi). The upgrade also included an additional pit lane facility to cater for the new configuration, a new race control tower and new amenities buildings. Work on the upgrades began in June 2011, with a new piece of road joining turns four and nine. This link road, finished in October 2011, created the new "Druitt Circuit", also known as the North Circuit. The 830-metre extension on the south-eastern part of the circuit was completed in May 2012 to create the new "Amaroo Circuit" (or South Circuit). When the extension is added to the existing Gardner GP Circuit, the full length 4.500 km (2.796 mi) circuit is called the "Brabham Circuit" named for Sydney's own triple World Formula One Drivers' Champion and still the only person to win the championship in a car bearing his name (1966), Sir Jack Brabham. On 21 May 2012, the circuit was renamed from Eastern Creek International Raceway to Sydney Motorsport Park. Construction of the new pit lane between turns four and five also began at this time.

Following the circuits' reconfiguration, a number of corners were named. At the circuits' re-opening, turn five was renamed "Brock's 05" in reference to Peter Brock and the number with which he was associated, whilst in October 2017 the first two corners were renamed "Moffat Corner" and "Bond Bend" respectively.

== FIA / FIM Gradings ==
The Gardner, Brabham and Druitt North circuits at Sydney Motorsport Park hold an FIA (Fédération Internationale de l'Automobile) Grade 2 license. The circuit also holds an FIM (Fédération Internationale de Motocyclisme) Class B License.

It is the only permanent track in Australia with both the FIA Grade 2 and FIM Class B track licenses.

== Configurations ==
Original Grand Prix Circuit (1990–2011)

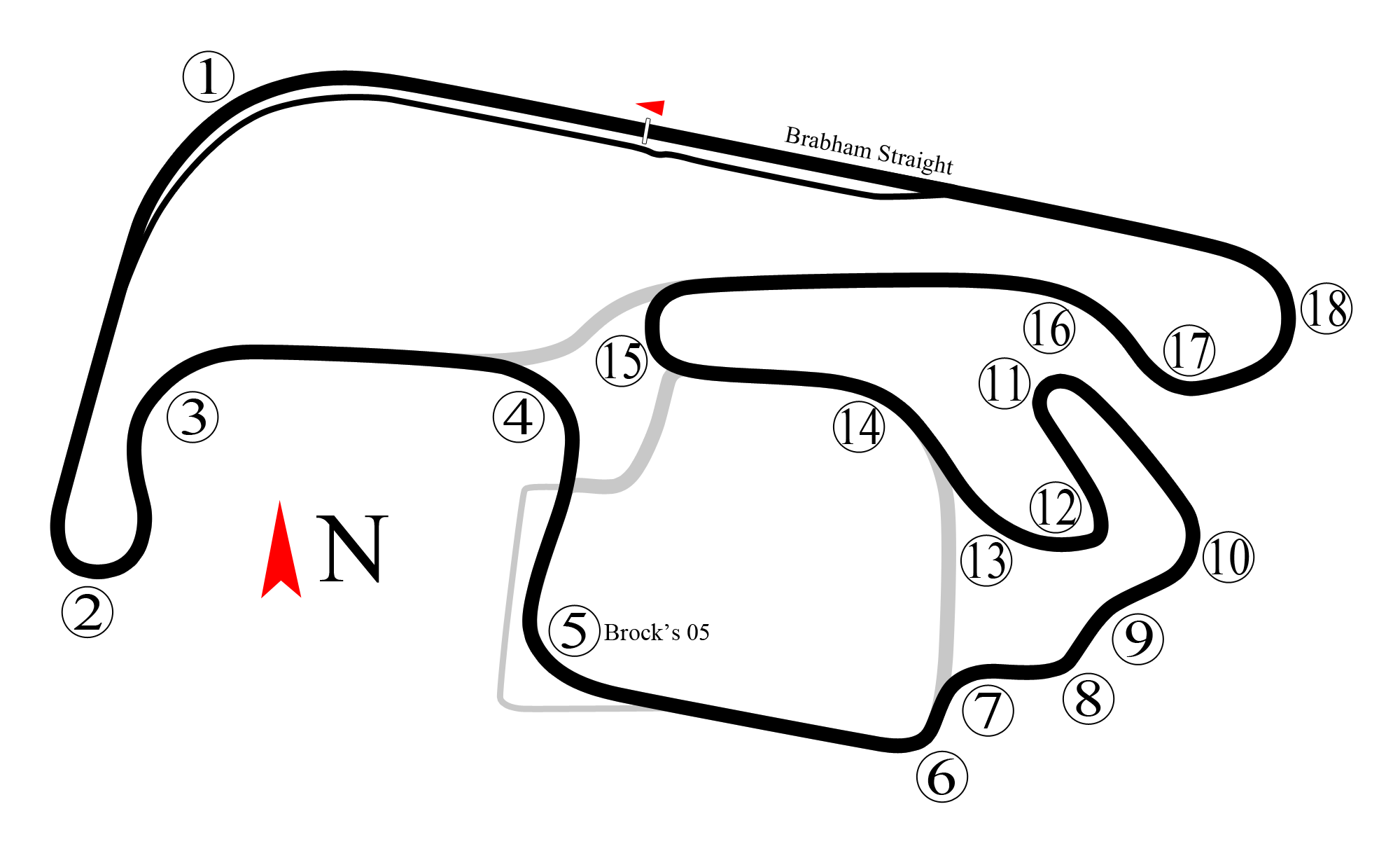
Brabham Extended Circuit (2012–present)

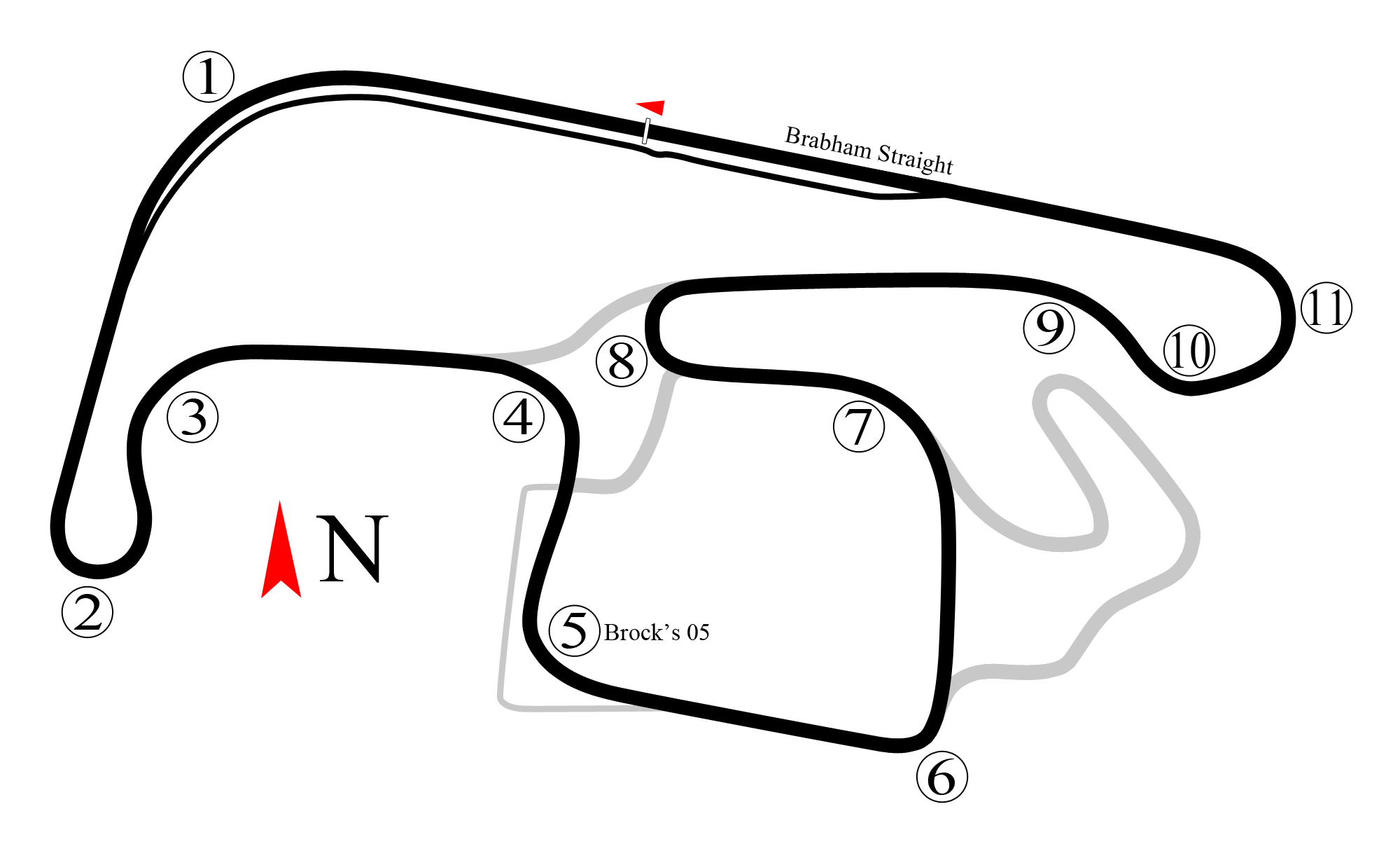
Gardner Grand Prix Circuit (2012–present)

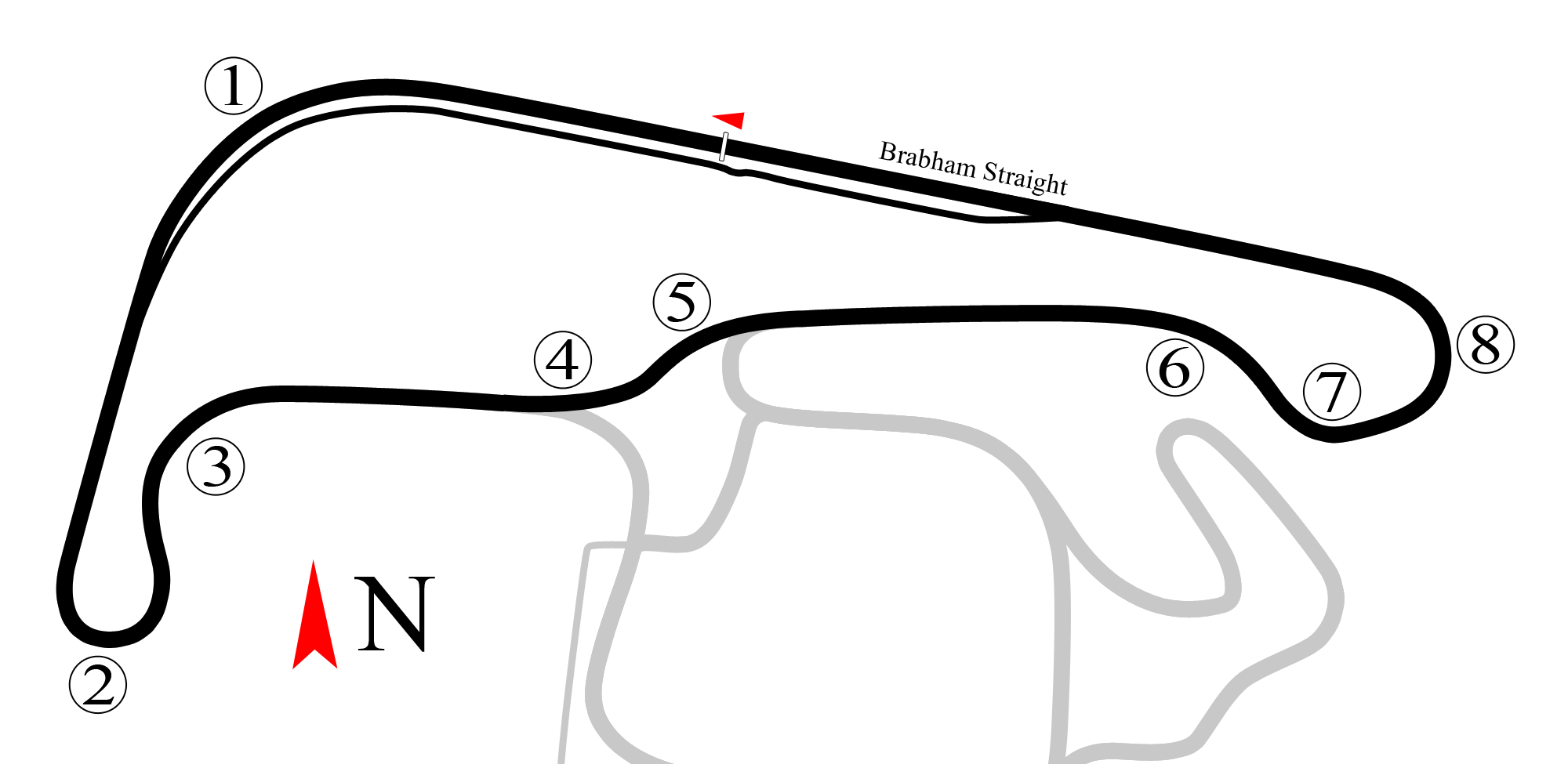
Druitt North Circuit (2012–present)

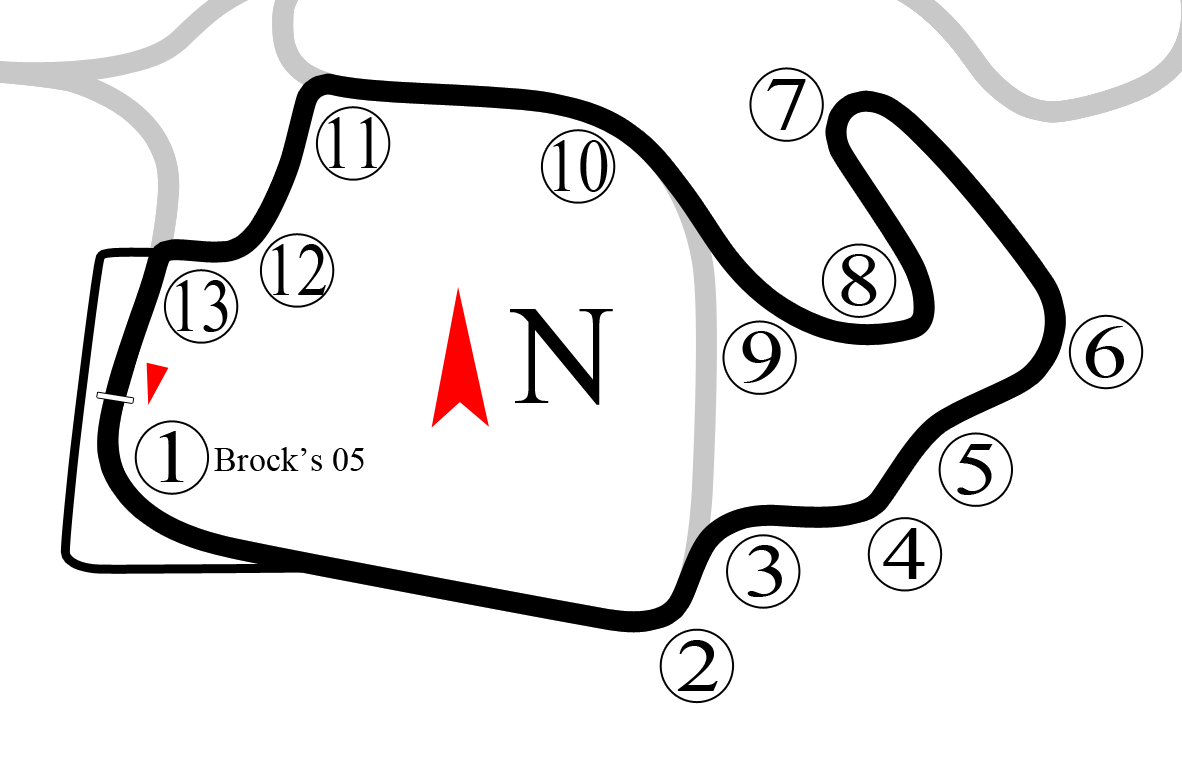
Amaroo South Circuit (2012–present)

== Major events ==
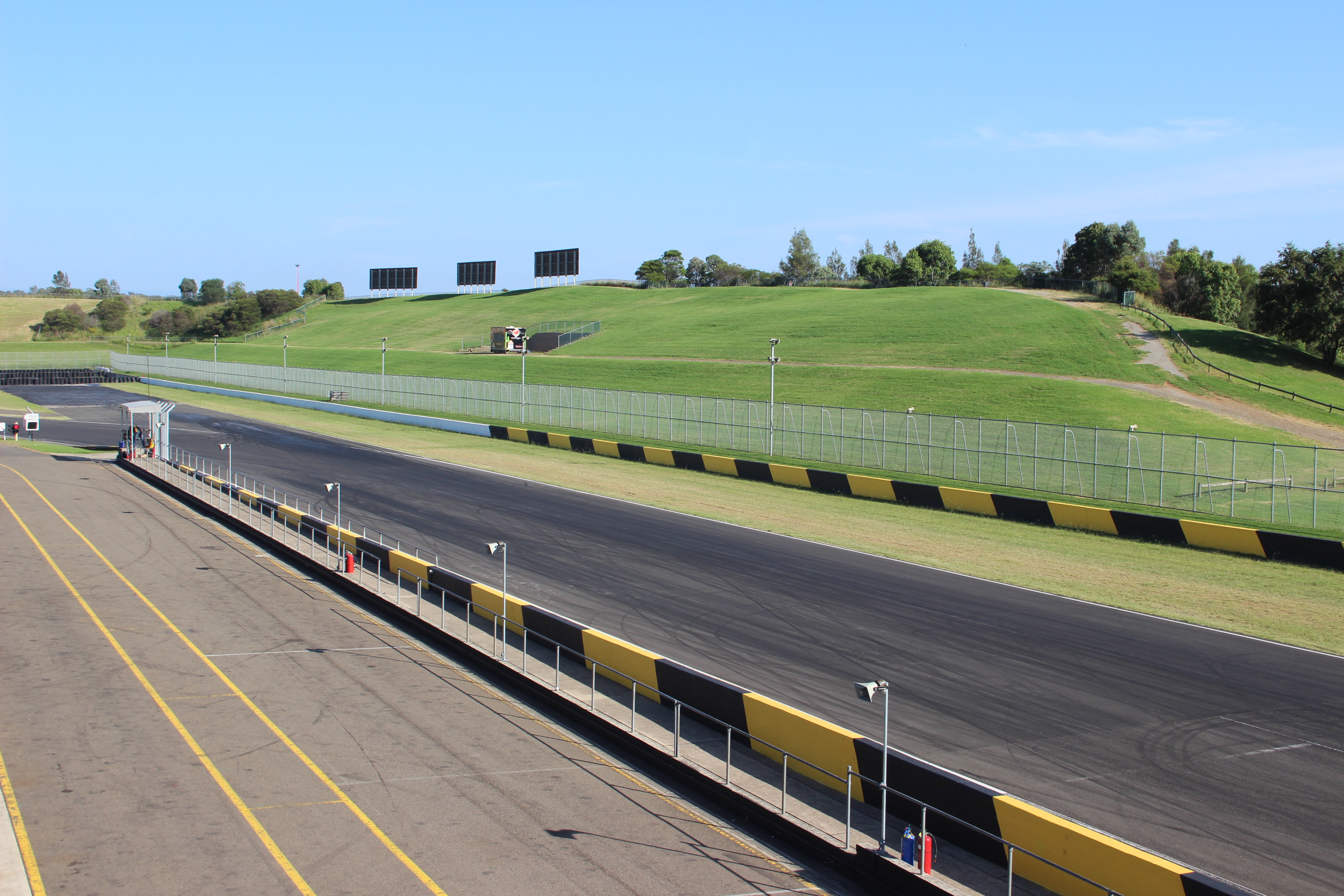
The turn one spectator hill.

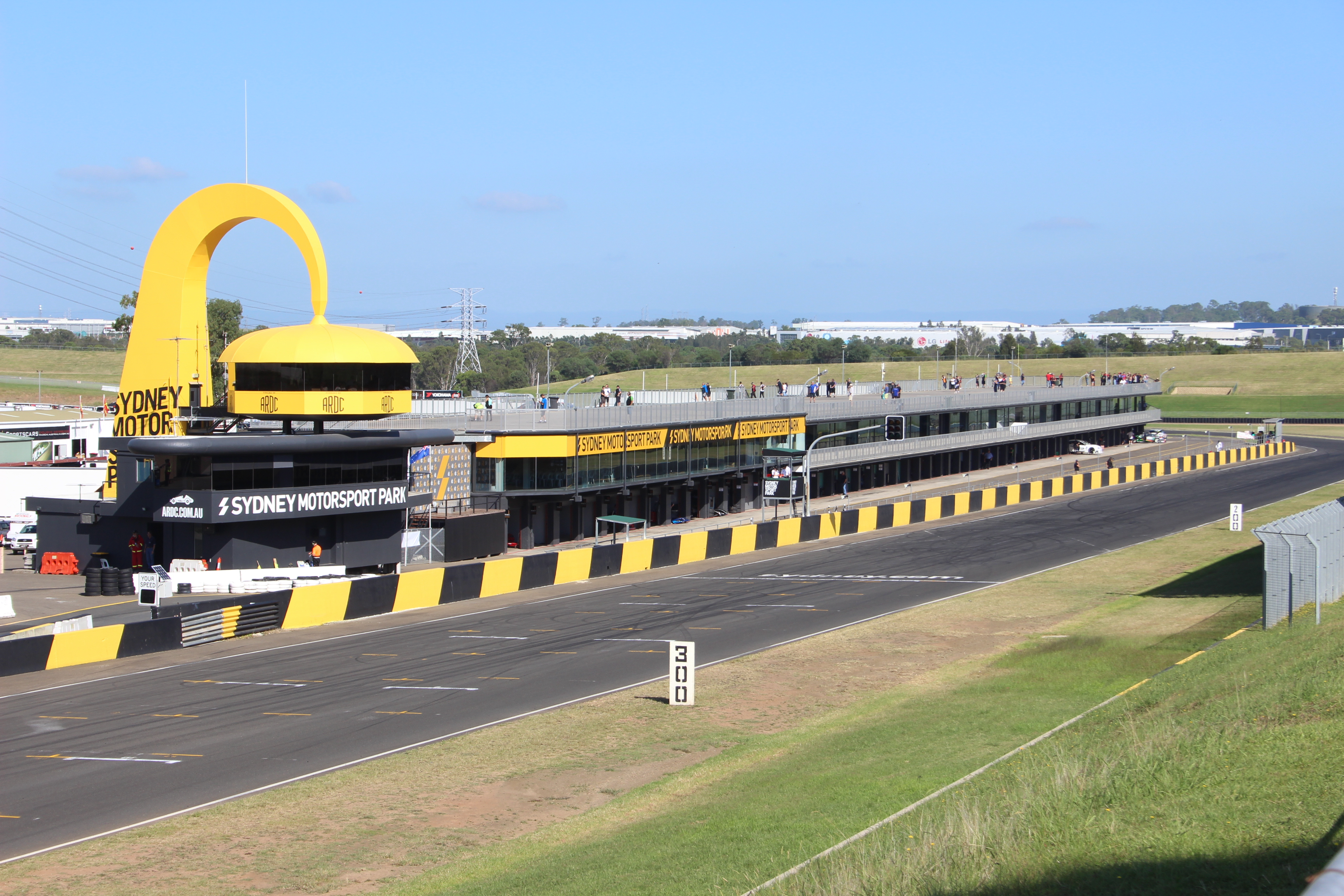
The race control building and the main pit lane.

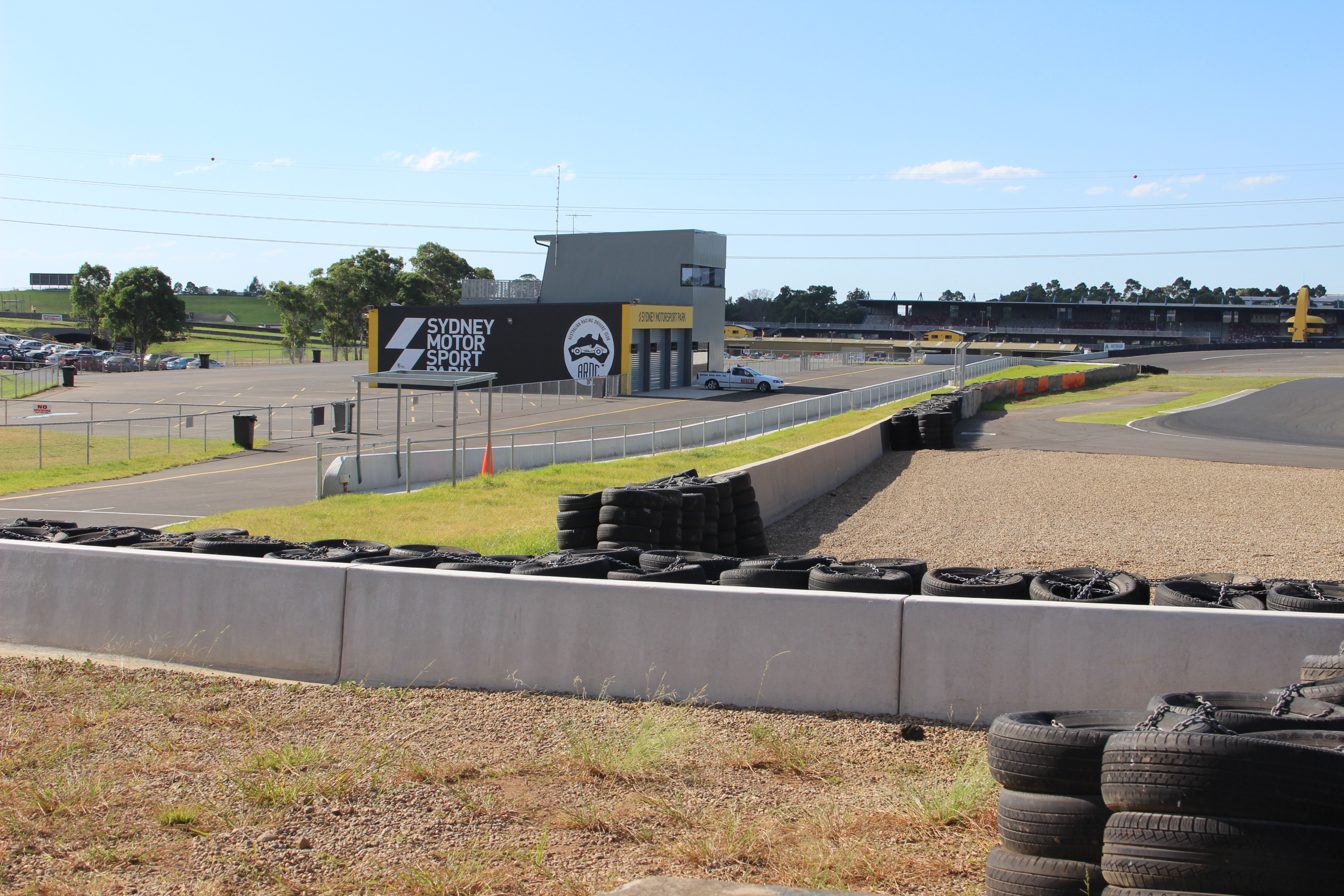
The secondary pit lane constructed for the Amaroo South Circuit. The main pit lane and grandstand can be seen in the background.

=== Motorcycling ===
After the first Australian motorcycle Grand Prix held at Phillip Island in 1989, there was a conflict over advertising between the Victorian Government and the tobacco industry, who were major sponsors of the Grand Prix teams. The New South Wales Government saw this as an opportunity to bring the race to Sydney and in October 1990, a deal was made for the Grand Prix to be held at what was then known as Eastern Creek International Raceway from 1991 to 1993. The race remained at the circuit until 1996 before returning to Phillip Island in 1997.

The circuit also hosts rounds of the Australian Superbike Championship, currently (as of 2025) running the only night race in the championship series.

==== Australian motorcycle Grand Prix winners ====
Year	125 cc	250 cc	500 cc
1991	(Italy) Loris Capirossi	(Italy) Luca Cadalora	(United States) Wayne Rainey
1992	(Germany) Ralf Waldmann	(Italy) Luca Cadalora	(Australia) Michael Doohan
1993	(Germany) Dirk Raudies	(Japan) Tetsuya Harada	(United States) Kevin Schwantz
1994	(Japan) Kazuto Sakata	(Italy) Max Biaggi	(United States) John Kocinski
1995	(Japan) Haruchika Aoki	(Germany) Ralf Waldmann	(Australia) Michael Doohan
1996	(Australia) Garry McCoy	(Italy) Max Biaggi	(Italy) Loris Capirossi

=== A1 Grand Prix ===
The Australian round of the A1 Grand Prix championship was held at Sydney Motorsport Park from the 2005–06 season to the 2007–08 season. During the 2006–07 event on 4 February 2007, German driver Nico Hülkenberg set the outright lap record for the original circuit layout with a 1:19.142 lap time in the A1 Team Germany prepared Lola-Zytek.

==== A1 Grand Prix winners ====
Year	Driver	Car	Entrant
2005	(France) Nicolas Lapierre	Lola A1GP	A1 Team France
2005	(France) Nicolas Lapierre	Lola A1GP	A1 Team France
2007	(Germany) Nico Hülkenberg	Lola A1GP	A1 Team Germany
2007	(Germany) Nico Hülkenberg	Lola A1GP	A1 Team Germany
2008	(France) Loïc Duval	Lola A1GP	A1 Team France
2008	(South Africa) Adrian Zaugg	Lola A1GP	A1 Team South Africa

=== Touring cars ===
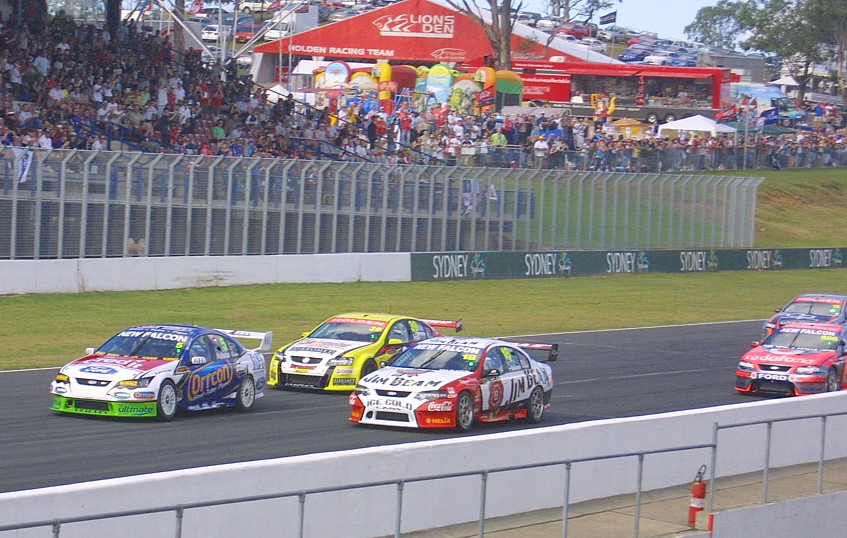
A V8 Supercar race in 2008.

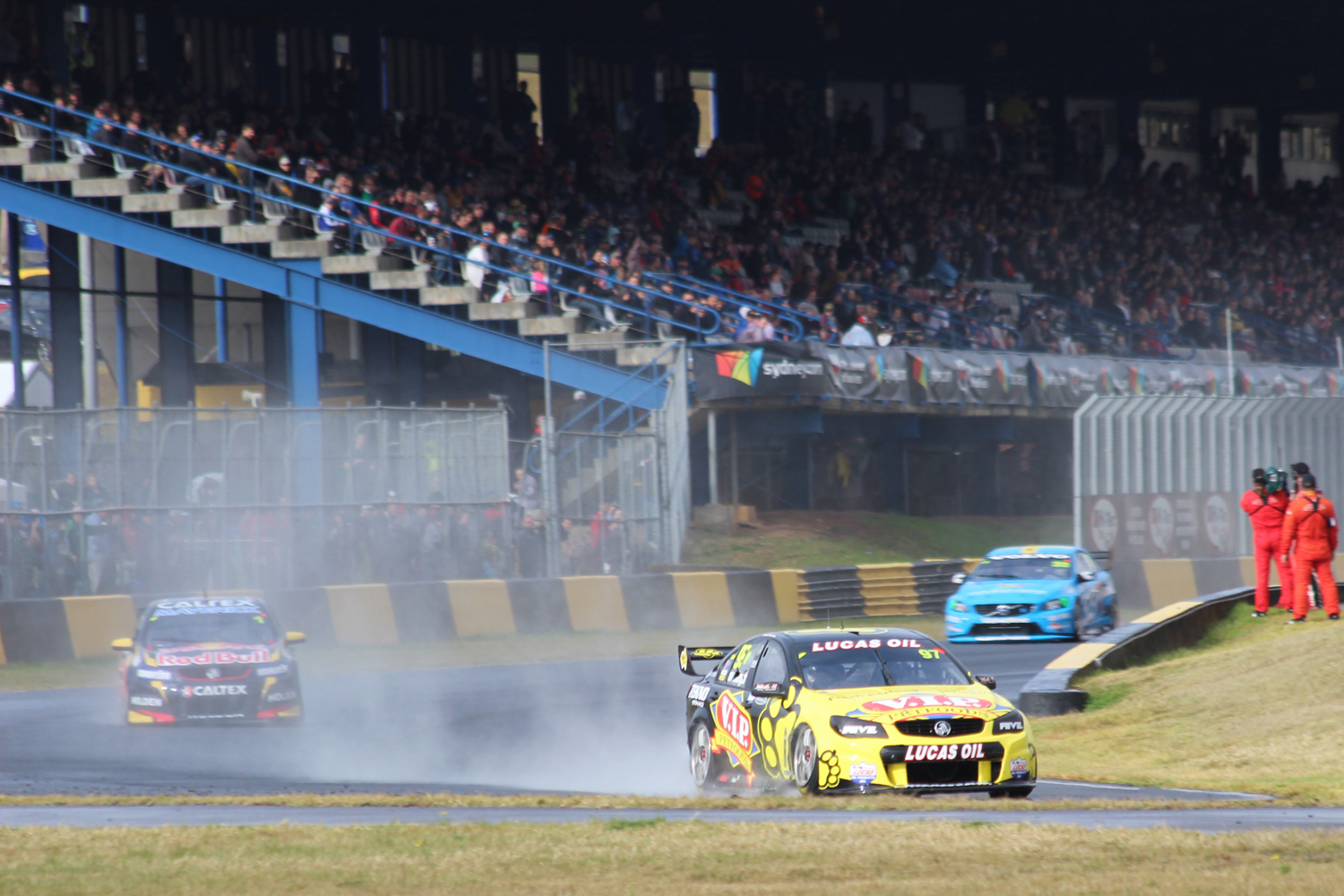
A V8 Supercar race in 2014.

Prior to the main race at the inaugural Sydney SuperNight 300 in 2018.

The first touring car event at the circuit was the 1990 Nissan Sydney 500, an endurance race which was the final round of both the 1990 Australian Endurance Championship and the 1990 Australian Manufacturers' Championship which was won by Larry Perkins and Tomas Mezera driving a Holden VL Commodore SS Group A. In the early 1990s, the circuit also hosted the Winfield Triple Challenge, a pre-ATCC (Australian Touring Car Championship) event for teams and drivers alongside Superbikes and drag racing.

The circuit first hosted a championship round of the ATCC (now known as V8 Supercars) in 1992 and held a round every year, excluding 1998 and 2006, until 2008. Further to this, the circuit hosted the season-ending Grand Finale in 2003 and 2004, with Marcos Ambrose winning the round and the championship title on both occasions. In 2009 the circuit was dropped in favour of the Sydney 500 on the Sydney Olympic Park Street Circuit. The circuit returned to the V8 Supercars calendar in 2012 after V8 Supercars failed to secure a second international event. After another year off the calendar in 2013, the circuit has returned to the calendar from 2014 onwards.

The official pre-season V8 Supercar test day was held at the circuit in 2011 and 2013 to 2015. The 2013 test day was the first time that the four Car of the Future manufacturers appeared together at a public event. The 2015 test day clashed with the 2015 Liqui Moly Bathurst 12 Hour, preventing V8 Supercars drivers from competing in the race.

==== ATCC / V8 Supercar round winners ====
Year	Driver	Car	Entrant
Group A
1992	(Australia) John Bowe	Ford Sierra RS500	Dick Johnson Racing
Group 3A Touring Cars
1993	(Australia) Glenn Seton	Ford EB Falcon	Glenn Seton Racing
1994	(Australia) Peter Brock	Holden VP Commodore	Holden Racing Team
1995	(Australia) Mark Skaife	Holden VR Commodore	Gibson Motorsport
1996	(Australia) Craig Lowndes	Holden VR Commodore	Holden Racing Team
1997	(Australia) Glenn Seton	Ford EL Falcon	Glenn Seton Racing
V8 Supercars
1999	(Australia) Mark Skaife	Holden VT Commodore	Holden Racing Team
2000	(Australia) Mark Skaife	Holden VX Commodore	Holden Racing Team
2001	(Australia) Mark Skaife	Holden VX Commodore	Holden Racing Team
2002	(Australia) Mark Skaife	Holden VX Commodore	Holden Racing Team
2003^{1}	(Australia) Marcos Ambrose	Ford BA Falcon	Stone Brothers Racing
2003^{1}	(Australia) Marcos Ambrose	Ford BA Falcon	Stone Brothers Racing
2004^{1}	(Australia) Rick Kelly	Holden VY Commodore	Kmart Racing Team
2004^{1}	(Australia) Marcos Ambrose	Ford BA Falcon	Stone Brothers Racing
2005	(Australia) Craig Lowndes	Ford BA Falcon	Triple Eight Race Engineering
2007	(Australia) Mark Skaife	Holden VE Commodore	Holden Racing Team
2008	(Australia) Will Davison	Ford BF Falcon	Dick Johnson Racing
2012	(Australia) Craig Lowndes	Holden VE Commodore	Triple Eight Race Engineering
2014	(New Zealand) Shane van Gisbergen	Holden VF Commodore	Tekno Autosports
2015	(Australia) Chaz Mostert	Ford FG X Falcon	Prodrive Racing Australia
2016	(Australia) Jamie Whincup	Holden VF Commodore	Triple Eight Race Engineering
2017	(New Zealand) Fabian Coulthard	Ford FG X Falcon	DJR Team Penske
2017	(New Zealand) Fabian Coulthard	Ford FG X Falcon	DJR Team Penske
2018	(New Zealand) Shane van Gisbergen	Holden ZB Commodore	Triple Eight Race Engineering
2020^{1}	(New Zealand) Scott McLaughlin	Ford Mustang GT	DJR Team Penske
2020^{1}	(New Zealand) Scott McLaughlin	Ford Mustang GT	DJR Team Penske
2021^{4}	(New Zealand) Shane van Gisbergen	Holden ZB Commodore	Triple Eight Race Engineering
2021^{4}	(Australia) Anton de Pasquale	Ford Mustang GT	Dick Johnson Racing
2021^{4}	(Australia) Anton de Pasquale	Ford Mustang GT	Dick Johnson Racing
2021^{4}	(New Zealand) Shane van Gisbergen	Holden ZB Commodore	Triple Eight Race Engineering
2022	(Australia) Chaz Mostert	Holden ZB Commodore	Walkinshaw Andretti United

Notes

- ^1 – Sydney Motorsport Park hosted two rounds of the 2003, 2004 and 2020 V8 Supercar Championship Series.
- ^2 – Sydney Motorsport Park hosted four rounds of the 2021 V8 Supercars Championship Series.

=== Winfield Triple Challenge ===
Between 1992 and 1995, the circuit hosted a non-championship Triple Challenge event in late January consisting of touring cars, Superbikes and drag racing. The event was backed by the Winfield cigarette brand, to promote their sponsorship of all three categories of racing. Glenn Seton Racing, sponsored by rival cigarette brand Peter Jackson, won the touring car element of the event in all four years, with eponymous team owner/driver Glenn Seton winning the first three with the last going to his team mate, 1980 Formula One World Drivers' Champion Alan Jones. In practice for the 1995 event, the Winfield-backed entry of Mark Skaife had a major accident at Turn 1, hitting concrete drag racing barriers which resulted in injuries that forced him to miss the first round of the 1995 Australian Touring Car Championship. The event concluded with the ban of cigarette advertising in Australia at the end of 1995.

==== Touring car winners ====
Year	Driver	Car	Entrant
1992	(Australia) Glenn Seton	Ford Sierra RS500	Glenn Seton Racing
1993	(Australia) Glenn Seton	Ford EB Falcon	Glenn Seton Racing
1994	(Australia) Glenn Seton	Ford EB Falcon	Glenn Seton Racing
1995	(Australia) Alan Jones	Ford EB Falcon	Glenn Seton Racing

=== Muscle Car Masters ===
An event organised and promoted by Australian Muscle Car magazine, the Muscle Car Masters is held on Father's Day every year. The event includes races and demonstration laps featuring Australian muscle cars and ex-race cars from the 1950s to the 1990s. Regular racing classes include Group N, Group C, Group A and Touring Car Masters while different car clubs have their cars on display each year and take part in demonstration laps. Historically significant cars in Australian motorsport are also present and complete laps of the circuit. While the main focus is on the history of Australian touring car racing, other classes, such as Formula 5000, have also appeared.

=== Event list ===
Current

- February: Supercars Championship Sydney 500, SuperUtes Series, GR Cup, Super2 Series, Touring Car Masters
- March: Australian Superbike Championship, David Choon Memorial Cup
- April: Australian Formula Ford Championship, Legends Short Track Nationals
- May: AU4 Australian Championship
- June: Sydney Classic, Sydney 300
- July: Hi-Tec Oils Super Series, TA2 Racing Muscle Car Series, Australian Production Car Series, Australian Formula Ford Championship
- August: Touring Car Masters Muscle Car Masters, National Sports Sedan Series
- September: GT World Challenge Australia GT Festival Sydney, Ferrari Challenge Australasia, Porsche Sprint Challenge Australia, GT4 Australia Series, Radical Cup Australia, Mustang Cup Australia
- November: Summer Festival

Former

- A1 Grand Prix (2005, 2007–2008)
- Aussie Racing Cars (2003–2005, 2007–2010, 2012, 2015–2018, 2021–2022, 2025)
- Australian GT Production Car Championship (1994, 1998–2001)
- Australian Improved Production Nationals (1993, 1998, 2023)
- Australian Mini Challenge (2008)
- Australian National Trans-Am Series (2021–2023)
- Australian Nations Cup Championship (2000–2001, 2004)
- Australian Super Touring Championship (1993–1995, 1998)
- Eastern Creek 12 Hour (1995)
- Grand Prix motorcycle racing
  - Australian motorcycle Grand Prix (1991–1996)
- Lamborghini Super Trofeo Asia (2025)
- Porsche Carrera Cup Asia (2016)
- Porsche Carrera Cup Australia Championship (2003–2005, 2013–2016, 2018, 2024–2025)
- S5000 Australian Drivers' Championship (2021–2023)
- Supercars Championship
  - Grand Finale (2003–2004)
- S5000 Tasman Series (2021)
- TCR Australia Touring Car Series (2019, 2021–2024)
- TCR World Tour (2023)
- V8 Ute Racing Series (2001, 2004–2008)
- Winfield Triple Challenge (1992–1995)

== Music venue ==
In the 1990s, the venue held a number of rock concerts and music festivals including Guns N' Roses, Bon Jovi, Pearl Jam, the Alternative Nation festival and the Colossus 2 dance festival. Music festivals returned to the circuit in 2009 and 2010 when it hosted the Soundwave Festival for both years.

== Lap records ==
Daniel Ricciardo drove a Red Bull RB7 Formula One car during the Top Gear Festival at the circuit in March 2014 and set the unofficial lap time record with a time of 1:11.2330. However, as this time was not recorded during a race, it does not count as a lap record. As of September 2026, the fastest official race lap records at Sydney Motorsport Park are listed as:

Category	Time	Driver	Vehicle	Date
Gardner Grand Prix Circuit (May 2012–present): 3.910 km (2.430 mi)
World Time Attack Challenge	1:17.444	(Australia) Barton Mawer	Porsche 968	31 August 2024
Formula 3	1:22.6290	(Australia) Nick Foster	Mygale M08	13 July 2013
Formula Libre	1:24.3625	(Australia) Miles Bromley	Dallara F308	25 May 2024
S5000	1:25.4355	(Australia) Aaron Cameron	Ligier JS F3–S5000	30 July 2023
Radical Australia Cup	1:25.7027	(United Kingdom) James Winslow	Radical SR8	14 July 2013
F5000	1:26.2573	(Australia) Timothy Berryman	Lola T332	11 June 2017
GT3	1:26.3930	(Australia) Jaxon Evans	Ferrari 296 GT3	4 May 2025
Supersports/Sports Racer	1:26.7160	(Australia) Adam Proctor	Stohr WF1	13 July 2014
Sports Sedan	1:27.1537	(Australia) Jordan Caruso	Audi A4	10 September 2023
Superkart	1:28.1133	(Australia) Warren McIlveen	Stockman 115 Honda	5 July 2015
Formula 4	1:28.6320	(Australia) Jensen Marold	Tatuus F4-T421	30 May 2026
Superbike	1:29.001	(Australia) Josh Waters	Ducati Panigale V4 R	25 March 2023
Supercars	1:29.8424	(Australia) Jamie Whincup	Holden ZB Commodore	4 August 2018
Porsche Carrera Cup	1:30.2193	(Australia) Harri Jones	Porsche 911 (992 I) GT3 Cup	20 July 2024
Lamborghini Super Trofeo	1:30.8780	(Macau) Charles Leong	Lamborghini Huracán Super Trofeo EVO2	6 April 2025
Ferrari Challenge	1:30.9130	(Australia) Jim Pollicina	Ferrari 296 Challenge	28 June 2025
Supersport	1:31.484	(Australia) Tom Toparis	Yamaha YZF-R6	23 March 2024
GT2	1:31.8609	(Australia) David Crampton	KTM X-Bow GT2 Concept	30 July 2023
Super2 Series	1:32.2390	(New Zealand) Tyler Everingham	Nissan Altima L33	20 November 2021
Trans-Am Australia	1:33.7815	(Australia) Owen Kelly	Ford Mustang Trans Am	1 May 2021
Super Touring	1:33.8642	(Australia) Cameron McLean	BMW 320i	7 June 1998
GT4	1:34.1398	(Australia) Max Geoghegan	McLaren Artura GT4	4 May 2025
Super3 Series	1:34.4490	(Australia) Blake Fardell	Holden VE Commodore	20 November 2021
Formula Ford	1:34.4904	(New Zealand) Hunter McElrea	Mygale SJ10A	5 July 2015
TCR Touring Car	1:34.8437	(Australia) Will Brown	Hyundai i30 N TCR	19 May 2019
Mustang Cup	1:36.7119	(Australia) Oliver Wickham	Ford Mustang Dark Horse R	19 September 2026
Improved Production	1:37.0409	(Australia) Adam Poole	Holden Commodore	28 May 2023
Group A	1:37.8622	(Australia) Carey McMahon	Nissan Skyline R32 GT-R	6 September 2015
Touring Car Masters	1:38.8846	(Australia) John Bowe	Holden Torana SL/R	29 May 2022
F1 Sidecar	1:38.930	(New Zealand) Colin Buckely/ (New Zealand) Robbie Shorter	LCR-Kawasaki ZXR-RR 1000	19 March 2016
Moto3	1:39.157	(Australia) Dylan Whiteside	Honda NSF250R	10 September 2017
Group 3E	1:40.2722	(Australia) Cameron Crick	BMW M2	20 October 2024
Aussie Racing Cars	1:41.3982	(Australia) Mason Harvey	Mustang-Yamaha	22 March 2025
Supersport 300	1:43.120	(Australia) Jesse Stroud	Kawasaki EX400	22 March 2024
F2 Sidecar	1:43.879	(Australia) Jamie Crass/ (Australia) Lee Menzies	Windle-Suzuki GSXR 600	6 July 2024
Group Nc	1:44.1061	(Australia) David Wall	Ford Mustang	6 September 2015
SuperUtes Series	1:44.8170	(Australia) Cameron Crick	Ford Ranger	19 July 2024
Group Sc	1:44.8598	(Australia) Geoff Morgan	Porsche 911 Carrera	6 September 2015
Porsche 944	1:45.9016	(Australia) Chris Lewis-Williams	Porsche 944	20 May 2012
Saloon Cars	1:46.0023	(Australia) Ben Grice	Holden VT Commodore	5 July 2015
Formula Vee 1600	1:46.3209	(Australia) Dylan Thomas	Sabre 02	29 October 2023
Group Sb	1:46.6560	(Australia) Terry Lawlor	Shelby Mustang GT350	31 August 2019
GR Cup	1:46.7657	(Australia) James Lodge	Toyota GR86	20 July 2024
RX8 Cup	1:46:7860	(Australia) Tyler Collins	Mazda RX8	31 May 2026
Group Nb	1:48.1690	(Australia) Brad Tilley	Ford Mustang	11 June 2017
Formula Vee 1200	1:50.7942	(Australia) Mathew Pearce	Lepton V79	27 July 2014
Circuit Excel (CERA)	1:54.4698	(Australia) Tyler Collins	Hyundai Excel	20 July 2025
Oceania Junior Cup	1:58.507	(Australia) Archie Schmidt	Yamaha YZF-R15	25 March 2023
Brabham Extended Circuit (May 2012–present): 4.500 km (2.796 mi)
Formula 3	1:48.4905	(Australia) Nathan Gotch	Dallara F307	9 April 2016
F5000	1:50.2739	(Australia) Bryan Sala	Matich A50	1 September 2012
Formula Ford	1:50.7955	(Australia) Glenn Welch	Listec WIL013	9 June 2012
Superkart	1:52.3293	(Australia) Russell Jamieson	Anderson Maverick	10 April 2016
Superbike	1:54.080	(Australia) Glenn Allerton	BMW S1000RR	11 November 2012
Sports Sedan	1:55.5272	(Australia) Birol Setin	Chevrolet Camaro	10 April 2016
Formula Ford 1600	2:02.0827	(Australia) Andrew Gillespie	Spirit WL11 Ford	10 June 2012
Touring Car Masters	2:03.4282	(Australia) John Bowe	Ford Mustang	2 September 2012
AF2	2:03.8574	(Australia) Ron Coath	Cheetah Mk.8	18 May 2014
Group 3E	2:08.2918	(Australia) Bob Pearson	Mitsubishi Lancer Evolution X	10 June 2012
Formula Vee 1600	2:10.8484	(Australia) Daniel Reynolds	Sabre 02	9 June 2012
Group Sc	2:15.6060	(Australia) Rusty French	De Tomaso Pantera	1 September 2013
Group Sb	2:15.7747	(Australia) Damien Meyer	MG Midget	1 September 2013
Druitt North Circuit (May 2012–present): 2.800 km (1.740 mi)
Sports car racing	0:58.7580	(Australia) Adam Proctor	Stohr WF1	21 October 2012
Formula Libre	0:58.8797	(Australia) Winston van Laarhove	Dallara F308	12 August 2023
Formula 3	0:58.8937	(Australia) Nathan Gotch	Dallara F304	22 September 2012
Formula Atlantic	0:59.6077	(Australia) Chris Farrell	Swift 014.a	27 October 2012
Super2 Series	1:02.2670	(Australia) Reuben Goodall	Ford Mustang GT	21 February 2026
Formula Ford	1:05.0159	(Australia) David Whitmore	Spectrum 011	22 October 2011
Touring Car Masters	1:06.8117	(Australia) Andrew Fisher	Holden Torana SL/R 5000	22 February 2026
SuperUtes Series	1:11.3615	(Australia) Cody Brewczynski	Mazda BT-50	21 February 2026
GR Cup	1:11.7568	(Australia) Brock Stinson	Toyota GR86	21 February 2026
Formula Vee 1600	1:12.9585	(Australia) Dylan Thomas	Stinger 0151X	9 June 2012
Amaroo South Circuit: (May 2012–present): 1.800 km (1.118 mi)
Sports car racing	0:52.1357	(Australia) Dean Tighe	Dallara-Judd	10 August 2019
Original Grand Prix Circuit (1990–2011): 3.930 km (2.442 mi)
A1 Grand Prix	1:19.1420	(Germany) Nico Hülkenberg	Lola A1GP	4 February 2007
Formula Holden	1:22.5131	(Australia) Tim Leahey	Reynard 92D	26 March 2000
Formula 3	1:23.1737	(United Kingdom) James Winslow	Dallara F307	16 July 2011
Formula Libre/Historic	1:27.6786	(Australia) Ty Hanger	Ralt RT4	5 November 2005
GT3	1:28.0570	(Denmark) Allan Simonsen	Lamborghini Gallardo LP560 GT3	28 May 2011
AF2	1:29.3500	(Australia) Arthur Abrahams	Cheetah Mk.8	25 August 1991
500cc	1:30.359	(Spain) Àlex Crivillé	Honda NSR500	20 October 1996
V8 Supercars	1:31.7301	(Australia) Mark Skaife	Holden VT Commodore	28 March 1999
250cc	1:32.084	(Italy) Max Biaggi	Aprilia RSV 250	20 October 1996
Group 3A	1:32.433	(Australia) Greg Murphy	Holden VS Commodore	25 May 1997
Formula Xtreme	1:32.657	(Australia) Kevin Curtain	Yamaha R1	4 October 2003
Nations Cup	1:33.5918	(Australia) Paul Stokell	Lamborghini Diablo GTR	18 July 2004
Formula Ford	1:35.3251	(Australia) Jack Le Brocq	Mygale SJ11a	16 July 2011
Group A	1:35.490	(Australia) Tony Longhurst	BMW M3 Evolution	24 May 1992
125cc	1:36.272	(Japan) Haruchika Aoki	Honda RS125R	20 October 1996
Sidecar	1:37.420	(United Kingdom) Steve Abbott/ (United Kingdom) Jamie Biggs	LCR-Suzuki GSX-R1000	1 May 2005
Clubman Sports	1:38.7875	(Australia) Chris Barry	PRB Clubman	23 June 2002
Formula Ford 1600	1:38.9196	(Australia) Rob Storey	Spirit WL07 Ford	22 September 2007
Central Muscle Cars	1:41.5119	(New Zealand) Jason Richards	Chevrolet Camaro	6 September 2009
Group C (Australia)	1:43.0145	(New Zealand) Jason Richards	Holden LX Torana SS A9X Hatchback	4 September 2011
Italian Challenge	1:44.2082	(Australia) Andrew Leithhead	Alfa Romeo GTV6	24 June 2001
Commodore Cup	1:44.8247	(Australia) Tony Bates	Holden VS Commodore	17 July 2011
Group Nc	1:46.0209	(Australia) Ross Donnelley	Ford Mustang	28 November 2003
Group 3E	1:46.4351	(Australia) Bob Pearson	Mazda RX-7	7 November 2004
V8 Ute Racing Series	1:50.4062	(Australia) Grant Johnson	Holden VZ SS Ute	26 November 2006
Group Nb	1.50.5692	(Australia) Bill Trengrove	Ford Mustang	4 September 2011
Formula Vee 1200	1:50.9297	(Australia) Jay Hall	Jacer Volkswagen	25 September 2005
Group Sa	1:51.8841	(Australia) Peter Jackson	Austin-Healey 3000 MkI	28 May 2011
HQ Holden	1:58.4667	(Australia) Greg King	HQ Holden	7 December 1997
Group Na	2:11.2755	(Australia) Craig Stephenson	Holden FJ	22 June 2003
Original Druitt North Circuit (1990–2011): 2.800 km (1.740 mi)
Group 3A	1:00.974	(Australia) Craig Lowndes	Holden VR Commodore	27 January 1996
Formula Ford	1:05.0159	(Australia) David Whitmore	Spectrum 011	22 October 2011
Formula Ford 1600	1:07.2545	(Australia) Steve Charman	Spirit WL11 Ford	22 October 2011
