= Sam and The Fatman =

Australian television series

- Genre: Sports
- Country of origin: Australia
- Original language: English
- No. of seasons: 1
- No. of episodes: 7

Original release
- Network: Nine Network

Sam and The Fatman was a short-lived Australian sports television program, shown on the Nine Network and its affiliates from October to November 2000. The show was a spin-off from The AFL Footy Show and The NRL Footy Show, with hosts Sam Newman and Paul Vautin from those respective shows.

The show ran in the Thursday night timeslot, following the end of the football seasons. It featured a mix of sport and variety. The program's name was a pun of the TV show Jake and the Fatman

== See also ==
- List of Australian television series
