= 2001 Australian Nations Cup Championship =

The 2001 Australian Nations Cup Championship was an Australian motor racing competition open to drivers of GT style cars complying with Nations Cup regulations as published by PROCAR and approved by CAMS. The title, which was the second Australian Nations Cup Championship, was contested over an eight round series.

The championship was won by Jim Richards driving a Porsche 911 GT3. It was his second consecutive victory, having won the inaugural Australian Nations Cup Championship in 2000.

== Calendar ==
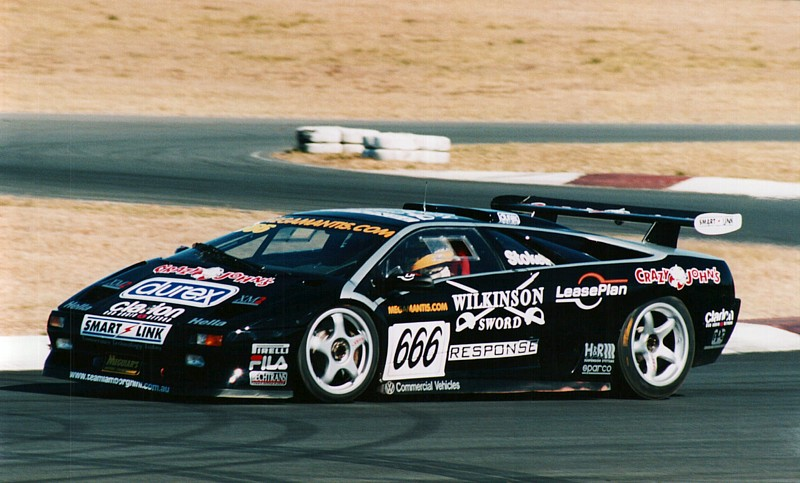
Paul Stokell placed second in the championship driving a Lamborghini Diablo for Team Lamborghini Australia

The championship was contested over eight rounds.

| Round | Circuit | State | Date | Format |
| 1 | Adelaide Parklands Circuit | South Australia | 7 April | One race |
| 2 | Wakefield Park | New South Wales | 6 May | Three races |
| 3 | Canberra Street Circuit | Australian Capital Territory | 9 & 10 June | Three races |
| 4 | Queensland Raceway | Queensland | 22 July | Three races |
| 5 | Eastern Creek International Raceway | New South Wales | 19 August | Three races |
| 6 | Sandown International Motor Raceway | Victoria | 15 September | One race |
| 7 | Gold Coast | Queensland | 26 & 27 October | Three races |
| 8 | Oran Park | New South Wales | 25 November | Three races |

Points were awarded on the results of each individual race with double points applied for the single race in Round 6. One point was awarded at each round for the driver who set pole position during qualifying.

== Results ==
| Position | Driver | No. | Car | Entrant | Ade. | Wak. | Can. | Que. | Eas. | San. | Gol. | Ora. | Total |
|---|---|---|---|---|---|---|---|---|---|---|---|---|---|
| 1 | Jim Richards | 1 | Porsche 911 GT3 | OAMPS Insurance Brokers | 55 | 150 | 175 | 112 | 112 | 100 | 155 | 125 | 984 |
| 2 | Paul Stokell | 666 | Lamborghini Diablo SVR; Lamborghini Diablo GTR | Team Lamborghini Australia | 61 | 156 | 1 | 181 | 175 | - | 181 | 121 | 876 |
| 3 | Peter Fitzgerald | 3 | Porsche 911 GT3 | Falken Tyres | 45 | 145 | 100 | 116 | 104 | 56 | 110 | 118 | 794 |
| 4 | Geoff Morgan | 12 | Chrysler Viper ACR | monster.com.au | - | - | 95 | 155 | 166 | 121 | 94 | 160 | 791 |
| 5 | Tony Quinn | 43 | Porsche 911 GT3 | VIP Petfoods Pty Ltd | 40 | 121 | 100 | 46 | 72 | 80 | 130 | 132 | 721 |
| 6 | D'arcy Russell | 7 | Chrysler Viper ACR | D'Arcy Russell Racing | - | - | 130 | 140 | 150 | - | 81 | - | 501 |
| 7 | Mark Noske | 4 | Ferrari 360 Challenge | Prancing Horse Racing | - | 166 | - | - | 140 | 110 | - | - | 416 |
| 8 | Domenic Beninca | 14 | Porsche 911 GT3 | TNT | 50 | 45 | 126 | 39 | 108 | - | - | - | 368 |
| 9 | John Teulan | 45 | Nissan Skyline GT-R; Ferrari 360 Challenge | Statewide GT-R Racing; Prancing Horse Racing | - | 52 | - | 54 | - | 72 | 100 | 72 | 350 |
| 10 | Maher Algadrie | 38 & 29; 62 | Ferrari 360 Challenge; Porsche 911 GT3 | Prancing Horse Racing; Matthew Coleman | 28 | 28 | 65 | 74 | 20 | - | 42 | 72 | 329 |
| 11 | Mike Downard | 8 | Porsche 911 GT3 | MPD Racing Pty Ltd | 24 | 69 | 37 | 28 | 48 | 48 | 58 | - | 312 |
| 12 | Craig Baird | 4 | Ferrari 360 Challenge | Prancing Horse Racing | - | - | 142 | 155 | - | - | - | - | 297 |
| 13 | Scott Shearman | 34 | Ferrari 360 Challenge | Prancing Horse Racing | - | 92 | - | 59 | 57 | - | - | 51 | 259 |
| 14 | Sam Newman | 17 | Ferrari 360 Challenge | Prancing Horse Racing | - | 69 | 24 | 52 | - | (64) | 68 | - | 213 |
| 15 | Neal Bates | 22 | Porsche 911 GT3 | Tekno Autosports | - | - | - | - | 84 | 90 | - | - | 174 |
| 16 | John Bowe | 888 | Ferrari 360 Challenge | Prancing Horse Racing | - | - | - | - | - | - | - | 155 | 155 |
| 17 | Bob Thorn | 88 | Jaguar XKR-T | Super Cheap Auto P/L | - | - | 16 | - | - | - | 34 | 72 | 122 |
| 18 | Steve Webb | 22 | Porsche 911 GT3 | Tekno Autosports | 32 | - | 20 | - | - | - | 69 | - | 121 |
| 19 | Stuart Gagg | 54 | Ferrari 360 Challenge | Prancing Horse Racing | - | 92 | 24 | - | - | - | - | - | 116 |
| 20 | David Scaysbrook | 28 | Porsche 911 GT3 | David Scaysbrook | - | - | - | - | - | - | 112 | - | 112 |
| 21 | Michael Turner | 25 | Porsche 911 GT3 | ADI Electrical Supplies | - | - | - | - | - | - | - | 100 | 100 |
| 22 | Max Warwick | 83 | Porsche 911 GT3 | Max Warwick | - | - | 96 | - | - | - | - | - | 96 |
| 23 | Ian Palmer | 20 | Honda NSX Brabham | Cockatoo Creek | - | - | 20 | 37 | - | - | - | 11 | 68 |
| 24 | Rusty French | 6 | Chrysler Viper ACR | Skye Sands | - | - | 60 | - | - | - | - | - | 60 |
| 25 | Tom Waring | 64 | Ferrari 360 Challenge | Prancing Horse Racing | - | - | - | - | - | - | 25 | 32 | 57 |
| 26 | Steve Beards | 24 | Ferrari 360 Challenge | Prancing Horse Racing | - | - | - | 39 | - | - | - | 17 | 56 |
| 27 | Martin Wagg | 70 | Porsche 911 GT3 | JMC Group / XL Concrete | - | - | - | 32 | - | - | 24 | - | 56 |
| 28 | Mark Williamson | 80 | Lotus Elise 200 | Mark Williamson | - | - | 50 | - | - | - | - | - | 50 |
| 29 | Dean Canto | 56 | BMW Z3 | Peak Performance | - | - | 45 | - | - | - | - | - | 45 |
| 30 | Mark Trenoweth | 88 | Jaguar XKR-T | Super Cheap Auto P/L | - | 37 | - | - | - | - | - | - | 37 |
| 31 | Jim Cornish | 54 | Ferrari 360 Challenge | Prancing Horse Racing | 36 | - | - | - | - | - | - | - | 36 |
| 32 | Winston Kim | 41 | Porsche 911 GT3 | PBR | - | - | 13 | - | - | - | - | - | 13 |

Note : The 64 points theoretically earned by Sam Newman for his seventh place in Round 6 were not included in points totals as published by PROCAR.
