= 1996 Australian Drivers' Championship =

Motor racing competition

Seasons
- ← 1995 1997 →

The 1996 Australian Drivers' Championship was an Australian motor racing competition for racing cars complying with CAMS Formula Holden regulations. The championship winner was awarded the 1996 CAMS Gold Star as the Australian Drivers' Champion. It was the 40th running of the Australian Drivers' Championship and the eighth to feature the Formula Holden category. The championship began on 8 March 1996 at the Albert Park Street Circuit and ended on 2 June at Mallala Motor Sport Park after eight races held over four rounds.

Paul Stokell won his third Australian Drivers' Championship in a season dominated by him and his Birrana Racing teammate Jason Bright. The two dark blue Reynard 91Ds won every race of the season except one. Bright's early season unreliability became the difference between the two at season's end. The only race they did not claim was race two at the 1996 Australian Grand Prix meeting which saw Europe-bound Mark Webber in a guest drive in the Graham Watson owned Reynard, take the win when both Stokell and Bright retired. Darren Edwards was consistently best of the rest of the field, claiming four top three finishes over the season. Stephen Cramp took three second places at the start of the season but faded, dropping to fifth position in the championship behind Adam Kaplan.

== Teams and drivers ==
The following drivers competed in the 1996 Australian Drivers' Championship.

Driver	No	Car	Entrant
(Australia) Paul Stokell	1	Reynard 91D Holden	Birrana Racing
(Australia) Allan Galloway	2	Reynard 91D Holden	Allan Galloway
(Australia) Geoff Fickling	3	Reynard 90D Holden	Graham Watson
(Australia) Steven Johnson	3	Reynard 90D Holden	Graham Watson
(Australia) Graham Watson	3	Reynard 90D Holden	Graham Watson
(New Zealand) Bryan Hartley	4	Dome F102 Holden	Bryan Hartley
(Australia) Stan Keen	5	Shrike NB89H Holden	Stan Keen
(New Zealand) Graham Sims	6	Reynard 90D Holden	Graham Sims
(Australia) Adam Kaplan	7	Reynard 91D Holden	Adam Kaplan
(Australia) Dean Irwin	8	Ralt RT21 Holden	Dean Irwin
(Australia) Jason Bright	9	Reynard 91D Holden	Birrana Racing
(Australia) Darren Edwards	10	Reynard 90D Holden	Clem Smith
(United Kingdom) James Taylor	11	Reynard 91D Holden	Ken Smith
(New Zealand) Ken Smith	11	Reynard 92D Holden	Ken Smith
(Australia) Chas Talbot	14	March 87B Holden	Chas Talbot
(Australia) Roger Seward	16	Ralt RT23 Holden	Roger Seward
(Australia) Arthur Abrahams	19	Reynard 92D Holden	Arthur Abrahams
(Australia) Stephen Cramp	21	Ralt RT23 Holden	Stephen Cramp
(Australia) Bob Minogue	29	Reynard 92D Holden	RA Minogue
(Australia) Mark Webber	30	Reynard 91D Holden	Graham Watson
(Australia) Owen Osborne	34	SPA 002 Holden	Owen Osborne
(Australia) Sam Astuti	47	Reynard 92D Holden	SH Racing
(Australia) Kevin Weeks	70	Reynard 91D Holden	Kevin Weeks
(New Zealand) Maurice O'Reilly	71	Reynard 91D Holden	Kevin Weeks
(Australia) Chris Hocking	74	Reynard 91D Holden	GL Knight & Assoc
(Australia) Brian Sampson	78	Cheetah Mk. 9 Holden	Brian Sampson
(Australia) Chas Jacobsen	87	Reynard 92D Holden	Chas Jacobsen
(Australia) Darren Pate	99	Reynard 90D Holden	Auz Racing Team Pty Ltd

== Race calendar ==
The 1996 Australian Drivers' Championship was contested over eight races at four rounds held in two states.

Rd/Race.	Circuit	Location / state	Date	Winner
R1/1	Albert Park Circuit	Melbourne, Victoria	8 March	Paul Stokell
R1/2	Albert Park Circuit	Melbourne, Victoria	9 March	Mark Webber
R2/1	Phillip Island Grand Prix Circuit	Phillip Island, Victoria	14 April	Paul Stokell
R2/2	Phillip Island Grand Prix Circuit	Phillip Island, Victoria	14 April	Paul Stokell
R3/1	Calder Park Raceway	Melbourne, Victoria	28 April	Jason Bright
R3/2	Calder Park Raceway	Melbourne, Victoria	28 April	Jason Bright
R4/1	Mallala Motor Sport Park	Mallala, South Australia	2 June	Paul Stokell
R4/2	Mallala Motor Sport Park	Mallala, South Australia	2 June	Jason Bright

== Results ==
Points were awarded 20–15–12–10–8–6–4–3–2–1 based on the top ten race positions in each race. Only half points were awarded for Race 1 of Round 2 at Phillip Island.

Pos.	Driver	Rd1/1	Rd2/2	Rd2/1	Rd2/2	Rd3/1	Rd3/2	Rd4/1	Rd4/2	Pts
1	Paul Stokell	1st	Ret	1st	1st	2nd	3rd	1st	Ret	97
2	Jason Bright	Ret	Ret	Ret	2nd	1st	1st	2nd	1st	90
3	Darren Edwards	3rd	4th	6th	3rd	4th	2nd	3rd	6th	80
4	Adam Kaplan	4th	3rd	5th	6th	5th	Ret	5th	3rd	60
5	Stephen Cramp	2nd	2nd	2nd	11th	8th	7th	Ret	4th	54.5
6	Arthur Abrahams	DNS	5th	Ret	5th	6th	6th	6th	5th	42
7	Kevin Weeks	5th	DNS	4th	7th	7th	5th	Ret	DNS	29
8	Darren Pate							4th	2nd	25
8	Sam Astuti			7th	10th	3rd	4th			25
10	Mark Webber	Ret	1st							20
11	Ken Smith			3rd	4th					16
12	Bryan Hartley	8th	7th			DNS	8th	11th	8th	13
13	James Taylor	6th	6th							12
14	Bob Minogue	7th	8th	DNS	Ret	DNS	Ret	7th	DNS	11
15	Chas Jacobsen			Ret	8th	9th	9th	14th	9th	9
16	Stan Keen	Ret	9th					9th	7th	8
17	Chris Hocking			9th	Ret	10th	10th	8th	Ret	6
18	Dean Irwin			8th	9th			Ret	11th	3.5
19	Alan Galloway	9th	DNS	Ret	DNS					2
19	Maurice O'Reilly	10th	10th							2
21	Owen Osborne			10th	DNS			10th	DNS	1.5
22	Roger Seward							15th	10th	1
Pos	Driver	Rd1/1	Rd2/2	Rd2/1	Rd2/2	Rd3/1	Rd3/2	Rd4/1	Rd4/2	Pts

Colour	Result
Gold	Winner
Silver	Second place
Bronze	Third place
Green	Points classification
Blue	Non-points classification
Blue	Non-classified finish (NC)
Purple	Retired, not classified (Ret)
Red	Did not qualify (DNQ)
Red	Did not pre-qualify (DNPQ)
Black	Disqualified (DSQ)
White	Did not start (DNS)
White	Withdrew (WD)
White	Race cancelled (C)
Blank	Did not practice (DNP)
Blank	Did not arrive (DNA)
Blank	Excluded (EX)
