= 1995 Australian Drivers' Championship =

Motor racing competition

Seasons
- ← 1994 1996 →

The 1995 Australian Drivers' Championship was an Australian motor racing competition for racing cars complying with Formula Brabham regulations as published by the Confederation of Australian Motor Sport (CAMS). The championship winner was awarded the 1995 CAMS Gold Star. It was the 39th Australian Drivers' Championship.

The championship was won by Paul Stokell driving a Reynard 91D for Birrana Racing.

== Schedule ==
The championship was contested over three rounds with two races per round.

- Round 1, Phillip Island Grand Prix Circuit, Victoria, 5 March
- Round 2, Oran Park Raceway, New South Wales, 2 April
- Round 3, Mallala Motor Sport Park, South Australia, 4 June

== Points system ==
Points were awarded on a 20-16-14-12-10-8-6-4-2-1 basis to the top ten placegetters in each race.

== Results ==
Position	Driver	No.	Car	Entrant	Phi R1	Phi R2	Ora R1	Ora R2	Mal R1	Mal R2	Total
1	Paul Stokell	1	Reynard 91D Holden	Birrana Racing	20	20	20	20	20	20	120
2	Stephen Cramp	21	Ralt RT23 Holden	Stephen Cramp			16	16	14	14	60
3	Kevin Weeks	70	Reynard 91D Holden	Kevin Weeks	14	Ret	14	12	Ret	6	46
3	Arthur Abrahams	19	Reynard 92D Holden	Arthur E Abrahams	10	14	Ret	DNS	10	12	46
5	Adam Kaplan	7	Reynard 91D Holden	Hunter Holden			12	14	12	Ret	38
5	Stan Keen	5	Shrike NB89H Holden	Stan Keen	4	6	6	6	8	8	38
7	Mark Skaife	3	Lola T93/50 Holden	Gibson Motorsport	16	16					32
7	Bob Minogue	29	Reynard 92D Holden	Bob Minogue	6	10	8	8			32
7	Mark Webber	9	Reynard 90D Holden	Birrana Racing					16	16	32
10	Bill Farmer	25	Dome F102 Holden		12	12					24
11	Chris Hocking	74	Reynard 91D Holden	GL Knight	8	Ret	10	Ret	0	2	20
12	Chas Jacobsen	87	Reynard 92D Holden	Chas Jacobsen	Ret	Ret	4	10	1	1	16
12	Albert Callegher	99	Reynard 90D Holden	Albert Callegher					6	10	16
14	Ron Barnacle	4	Reynard 90D Holden		Ret	8					8
15	Chas Talbot	14	March 87B Holden	Chas T Talbot			2	4	Ret	DNS	6
15	Damien French	11	Reynard 90D Holden						2	4	6
17	Rick Fabri		Hocking 911 Holden		2	3					5
18	Tony Hastings	71	Reynard 91D Holden	Kevin Weeks					4	DNS	4
19	Colin Milne	15	Hocking 911 Holden				1	2	0	0	3
	Allan Galloway		Reynard 91D Holden		DNS	DNS			0	Ret	

Colour	Result
Gold	Winner
Silver	Second place
Bronze	Third place
Green	Points classification
Blue	Non-points classification
Blue	Non-classified finish (NC)
Purple	Retired, not classified (Ret)
Red	Did not qualify (DNQ)
Red	Did not pre-qualify (DNPQ)
Black	Disqualified (DSQ)
White	Did not start (DNS)
White	Withdrew (WD)
White	Race cancelled (C)
Blank	Did not practice (DNP)
Blank	Did not arrive (DNA)
Blank	Excluded (EX)
