= Australian Mini Challenge =

- Category: Touring car racing One make racing
- Country: Australia
- Inaugural season: 2008
- Folded: 2010
- Tyre suppliers: Dunlop
- Last Drivers' champion: Chris Alajajian
- Official website: MINI Challenge - Planet MINI - www.mini.com.au

The Australian Mini Challenge was a touring car racing category in Australia. First held in 2008, the Mini Challenge supported both the V8 Supercar Championship Series and the V8 Supercar Development Series. The category is managed by Toleman Motorsport, who took over management rights following the demise of previous rights holder, Sherrin Motorsport. Late in 2010, BMW announced the withdrawal of its support of the series, with the final running held at the 2010 Sydney Telstra 500.

The Australian Mini Challenge was launched by MINI Australia, being the department of BMW Group Australia responsible for the MINI brand. The National MINI Manager (General Manager of MINI brand in Australia) Justin Hocevar developed the business case, negotiated partnerships & launched the series.

The first and only order of 25 vehicles from BMW Group were imported ADR and duty exempt, for the explicit use of motorsport activities. The vehicles were rushed into production & arrived in Australia with little spare time for the first round, arriving via airfreight into Sydney. During their initial 'shakedown' event at Eastern Creek. The vehicles developed a technical problem with a turbo component (wastegate) which would cause the vehicles to go into 'limp-home' mode. Working through the night, local technicians liaised with technical support in Munich before a software patch was issued, a resulting modest power reduction meant the vehicles stayed below a certain heat range whereby the turbocharger wastegate component would fail.

The series was intended to support the development of the MINI brand in Australia. The purpose was to improve the masculinity / masculine appeal of the brand, to demonstrate the robustness of the vehicles and to develop the brand's performance credentials, particularly through the sub-brand JCW (John Cooper Works). As a result, the MINI brand in Australia enjoyed a high skew towards the more profitable JCW products. JCW sales in Australia ranked amongst the best-performing markets in the word.

In 2011 the series competitors were thrown a lifeline and invited to compete in the Australian Manufacturers' Championship, in a series called the AMC Mini Cup. The only changes to the rules were the requirement to run on radial tyres and the addition of a dry break fuel system to the cars for long-distance events. The 2011 class pointscore was won by the only series regular Beric Lynton. Only three teams competed all season, the other two being the Sherrins Rentals team and Brendan Cook's team. All three cars never attended the same round however, with only one attending some rounds.

== The car ==
The R56 Mini hardtops were built by BMW Motorsport in Germany and flown to Australia. The Mini Challenge cars were based on the road going John Cooper works models, with a 1.6 litre, four cylinder, turbocharged engine producing 155 kW (208 hp). Weighing 1150 kg (2535 lb), the cars could accelerate to 100 km/h (62 mph) in just over six seconds and reach a top speed of 240 km/h (149 mph).

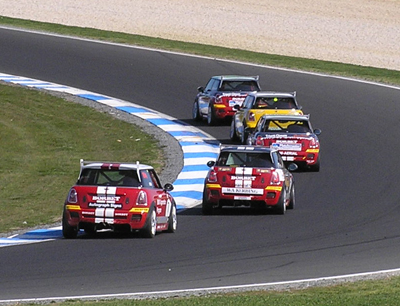
The Minis in support to the 2008 L&H 500

== Series Champions ==
| Year | Driver | Team |
|---|---|---|
| 2008 | Neil McFadyen | Doulman Automotive |
| 2009 | Paul Stokell | DecoRug Racing |
| 2010 | Chris Alajajian | Jack Hillerman Racing |

=== Mini Cup ===
| Year | Driver | Team |
|---|---|---|
| 2011 | Beric Lynton | Bruce Lynton Mini Garage |
