= Paul Stokell =

Australian racing driver (born 1968)

- Nationality: Australian
- Born: Paul Francis Stokell; 8 March 1968 (age 58) Tasmania, Australia

Australian Mini Challenge
- Years active: 2008-2010
- Teams: Decorug Racing
- Starts: 62
- Wins: 16
- Poles: 6
- Fastest laps: 15
- Best finish: 1st in 2009 Australian Mini Challenge

Previous series
- Pre 1990 1990 1992-96, 2001 1994 1995 1998 2000-04 2000-04 2004 2007-08 2007: Formula Vee; Aust. Formula Ford; Australian Drivers' Championship EFDA Nations Cup; Indonesian Grand Prix; Australian GT Production; Nations Cup; V8 Supercar; Australian GT Performance; Australian Carrera Cup; Australian GT Championship

Championship titles
- 1994 1995 1995 1996 2003 2004 2009 2018-19: Australian Drivers' Championship; Australian Drivers' Championship; Indonesian Grand Prix; Australian Drivers' Championship; Australian Nations Cup; Australian Nations Cup; Australian Mini Challenge; Australian Targa Championship

Paul Francis Stokell (born 8 March 1968 in Tasmania) is an Australian racing driver. Highly decorated in every category he has competed, Stokell has been a race and multiple championship winning driver in open wheel, sportscar racing and tarmac rallying, consistently since the early 1990s and remains so today having won back to back Australian Targa Championship in 2018/2019.

While Tasmanian born, today Stokell is Queensland based where he has operated a performance driving school since 2008, and has been involved with the Sherrin Motor Sport Porsche Carrera Cup team taking their maiden victory in 2007.

== Open wheelers ==
Stokell first emerged into the national spotlight racing in the national Australian Formula Ford series, taking a Reynard to runner up in the 1990 title behind Russell Ingall. Stokell tried to push his career in England in the next couple of years however a lack of support forced his return to Australian racing in 1993 driving for Malcolm Ramsay's South Australian Birrana Racing team in Formula Brabham (which reverted to its original name of Formula Holden in 1996). With Stokell leading, Birrana came to dominate the category and Stokell took a trifecta of Australian Drivers' Championships in the mid-90s. In 1994, he represented Australia in the EFDA Nations Cup but the highlight of the era was his first international victory, winning the 1994 New Zealand International Series and 1995 Pan Pacific title including the Indonesian Grand Prix.

== Sports cars ==
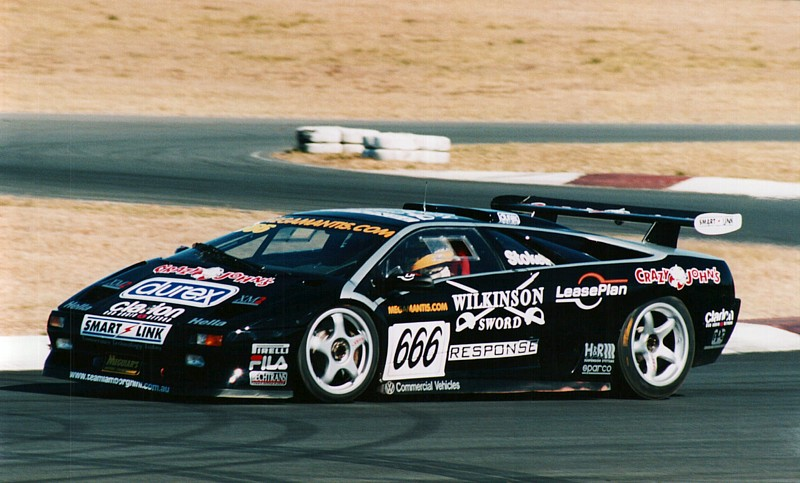
Stokell driving a Lamborghini Diablo SVR in the 2001 Australian Nations Cup Championship.

In 1998, Stokell led an importer supported team driving Lotus Elise in the Australian GT Production Car Championship and against larger and more powerful cars Stokell became a giant-killer in the Lotus, finishing sixth in the championship. Out of this effort came an invitation to join the newly formed Team Lamborghini Australia, to race Lamborghini Diablos in the Australian Nations Cup Championship. Starting in 2000, Stokell was a constant front runner in the black Diablo and again became a championship winner in 2003 and 2004. In 2005, he drove in one round of the FIA GT Championship in a Lotus placing second in the G2 class.

Since then Stokell has made sporadic appearances in a variety of categories and became a competitor and entrant in the new Mini Challenge series in 2008 and became series champion in 2009. He followed that by representing Australia for the second time in the Spanish Mini Challenge in 2010 as well as finishing second in the Australian Mini Challenge in 2010.

== Career results ==
Some results sources from:

Season	Series	Position	Car	Team
1990	Motorcraft Formula Ford Driver to Europe Series	**2nd**	Reynard FF88 Ford; Swift FB90 Ford	Phoenix Motorsport; Swift Australia
1992	Australian Drivers' Championship	15th	Shrike NB89H Holden	
1993	Australian Drivers' Championship	**3rd**	Reynard 90D Holden	Birrana Racing
1994	Australian Drivers' Championship	**1st**	Reynard 91D Holden	Birrana Racing
1994	EFDA Nations Cup	16th †	Van Diemen – Opel	Team Australia
1995	Australian Drivers' Championship	**1st**	Reynard 91D Holden	Birrana Racing
1995	Pan-Pacific Formula Brabham Championship	**1st**	Reynard 91D Holden	Birrana Racing
1996	Australian Drivers' Championship	**1st**	Reynard 91D Holden	Birrana Racing
1998	Australian GT Production Car Championship	6th	Lotus Elise Sport 19	
2000	Australian Nations Cup Championship	4th	Lamborghini Diablo SVR	Team Lamborghini Australia
2000	Shell Championship Series	50th	Ford Falcon (AU)	Steven Ellery Racing
2001	Australian Drivers' Championship	11th	Reynard Holden	Birrana Racing
2001	Australian Nations Cup Championship	**2nd**	Lamborghini Diablo SVR	Team Lamborghini Australia
2001	Shell Championship Series	74th	Ford Falcon (AU)	Dick Johnson Racing
2002	Australian Nations Cup Championship	4th	Lamborghini Diablo GTR	Team Lamborghini Australia
2002	V8Supercar Championship Series	47th	Ford Falcon (AU)	Paul Little Racing
2003	Australian Nations Cup Championship	**1st**	Lamborghini Diablo GTR	Team Lamborghini Australia
2003	V8Supercar Championship Series	69th	Ford Falcon (BA)	Paul Little Racing
2003	Australian GT Performance Championship	21st	Volkswagen Golf R32	Volkswagen Australia
2004	Australian Nations Cup Championship	**1st**	Lamborghini Diablo GTR	Team Lamborghini Australia
2004	Australian GT Performance Championship	**2nd**	Volkswagen Golf R32	Volkswagen Australia
2004	V8 Supercar Championship Series	57th	Holden Commodore (VY)	Team Dynamik
2007	Australian Carrera Cup Championship	14th	Porsche 997 GT3 Cup	
2007	Australian GT Championship	24th	Lamborghini Gallardo	Team Palmer
2008	Australian Carrera Cup Championship	19th	Porsche 997 GT3 Cup	Sherrin Motor Sport
2008	Australian Mini Challenge	**2nd**	Mini John Cooper Works Challenge	Decorug Racing
2009	Australian Mini Challenge	**1st**	Mini John Cooper Works Challenge	Decorug Racing
2010	Australian Mini Challenge	**2nd**	Mini John Cooper Works Challenge	Decorug Racing
2021	GT World Challenge Australia - GT Am	6th	Audi R8 LMS (2015)	Melbourne Performance Centre
2022	GT World Challenge Australia - GT Am	**1st**	Audi R8 LMS Evo II	Melbourne Performance Centre
2023	GT World Challenge Australia - GT Am	**2nd**	Audi R8 LMS Evo II	Melbourne Performance Centre
2024	GT World Challenge Australia - Sprint Series	8th	Audi R8 LMS Evo II	Melbourne Performance Centre
2024	GT World Challenge Australia - Endurance Cup	5th	Audi R8 LMS Evo II	Melbourne Performance Centre
2025	GT World Challenge Australia - Trophy	**3rd**	Audi R8 LMS Evo	Melbourne Performance Centre

- † Team result

=== Complete Indonesian Grand Prix results ===
(key) (Races in bold indicate pole position; races in italics indicate fastest lap)

Year	Car	1	2	Rank	Points
1993	Reynard 90D Mugen-Honda	SEN; 2	SEN; 2	2nd	30

=== Complete V8 Supercar results ===
Year	Team	1	2	3	4	5	6	7	8	9	10	11	12	13	14	Final pos	Points
2000	Steven Ellery Racing	PHI	PTH	ADL	ECK	HDV	CAN	QLD	WIN	OPK	CDR	QLD; 13	SAN	BAT; Ret		50	56
2001	Dick Johnson Racing	PHI	ADL	ECK	HDV	CAN	PTH	CDR	OPK	QLD; Ret	WIN	BAT	PUK	SAN		74th	72
2002	Toll Racing	ADL	PHI	ECK	HDV	CAN	PTH	ORP	WIN	QLD; 21	BAT; 12	SUR	PUK	SAN 1; 24	SAN 2 Ret	47th	81
2003	Toll Racing	ADL	PHI	ECK	WIN	PTH	HDV	QLD	ORP	SAN; 30	BAT; 11	SUR	PUK	ECK		69th	80
2004	Team Dynamik	ADL	ECK	PUK	HDV	PTH	QLD	WIN	ORP	SAN; Ret	BAT; 13	SUR	SYM	ECK		57th	144

=== Complete Australian Nations Cup results ===
Year	Team	Car	1	2	3	4	5	6	7	8	Final pos	Points
2000	Team Lamborghini Australia	Lamborghini Diablo SVR	ADL; 3	ECK; 4	CAN; 7	QLD; 2	ORA; 9	CAL; 4	SUR; 3	BAT; 1	4th	147
2001	Team Lamborghini Australia	Lamborghini Diablo SVR	ADL; 1	WAK; 2	CAN; 20	QLD; 1	ECK; 1	SAN; DNF	SUR; 1	ORA; 5	2nd	876
2002	Team Lamborghini Australia	Lamborghini Diablo GTR	ADL; 1	SYM	ORA; 9	WIN; 1	QLD	WAK; 4	PHI; 3	SUR; 2	4th	855
2003	Team Lamborghini Australia	Lamborghini Diablo GTR	ADL; 2	SYM; 4	WAK; 2	QLD; 1	ORA; 1	PHI; 1	WIN; 2	SUR; 1	1st	539
2004	Team Lamborghini Australia	Lamborghini Diablo GTR	ADL; 1	ORA; 2	SAN; 1	WIN; 2	ECK; 1	WAK; 1	MAL; 2		1st	572

=== Complete Bathurst 1000 results ===
Year	Team	Car	Drivers	Class	Laps	Outright	Class
1990	Toyota Team Australia	Toyota Corolla FX-GT	(Australia) Mike Dowson (Australia) John Faulkner	3	130	27th	**3rd**
1997	Wayne Gardner Racing	Holden Commodore VS	(Australia) Peter Bradbury (Australia) Anthony Tratt	L1	16	DNF	DNF
1998	Wayne Gardner Racing	Holden VS Commodore	(Australia) Wayne Gardner	OC	149	13th	12th
2000	Steven Ellery Racing	Ford AU Falcon	(Australia) Steven Ellery		82	DNF	DNF
2002	Paul Little Racing	Ford Falcon AU	(Australia) Anthony Tratt		160	12th	12th
2003	Paul Little Racing	Ford Falcon BA	(Australia) Anthony Tratt		106	DNF	DNF
2004	Team Dynamik	Holden Commodore VY	(New Zealand) Simon Wills		159	13th	13th

=== Complete Bathurst 24 Hour results ===
Year	Team	Co-drivers	Car	Class	Laps	Pos.	Class pos.
2003	(Australia) Mark Coffey Racing	(Denmark) Allan Simonsen (Australia) Luke Youlden (Australia) Peter Hackett	Lamborghini Diablo GTR	A	487	8th	6th

=== Complete Bathurst 12 Hour results ===
Year	Team	Co-drivers	Car	Class	Laps	Pos.	Class pos.
2009	(Australia) Rockstar Energy Drink	(Australia) Josh Hunt (Australia) Jonathon Webb	Nissan 350Z	B	149	DNF	DNF
2014	(Australia) Fiat Abarth Motorsport	(Australia) Clyde Campbell (Australia) Joshua Dowling (Australia) Toby Hagon	Fiat Abarth 500	F	236	22nd	**2nd**
2022	(Australia) Supabarn Motorsport	(Australia) James Koundouris (Australia) Theo Koundouris (Australia) David Russell	Audi R8 LMS Evo II	AAm	283	9th	**1st**

Sporting positions
Preceded by Mark Skaife	Winner of the Australian Drivers' Championship; 1994, 1995 and 1996	Succeeded by Jason Bright
Preceded by Craig Baird	Lady Wigram Trophy; Winner; 1994	Succeeded by Darren Palmer
Preceded by First title	Pan-Pacific Formula Brabham Championship; Champion; 1995	Succeeded by Incumbent
Preceded by Jim Richards	Australian Nations Cup Championship; Champion; 2003 & 2004	Succeeded by Incumbent
Preceded by Neil McFadyen	Australian Mini Challenge; Champion; 2009	Succeeded by Chris Alajajian
Preceded by Andrew Macpherson & Ben Porter	GT World Challenge Australia; GT Am Champion; 2022	Succeeded by Brad Schumacher
