= Arthur Abrahams =

Australian race car driver (born 1955)

- Nationality: Australian
- Born: 6 November 1955 (age 71)
- Retired: 1999

Australian Drivers' Championship
- Years active: 1987-89, 1994-1996, 1999
- Best finish: 4th in 1995 Australian Drivers' Championship

Previous series
- 1989-90 1988 1987-88 1982, 1991: Indy Lights; World Sports Prototype Champ. Australian Formula 2 Championship; Australian Endurance Championship

Championship titles
- 1987: Australian Formula 2 Championship

Arthur Edward Abrahams is a semi-retired Australian race car driver. He won the 1987, 1991 and 1993 Australian Formula 2 Championships driving a Cheetah Mk8, Ransburg Cheetah and Reynard 913 respectively. He also won the Australian Endurance Championship (1600cc) in 1982. He competed in International Sportscars in Europe and in American open wheel racing cars. He also competed in Formula Brabham/Holden for three years, debuting in 1994 and leaving the category in 1996. He was owner of the NRC International team in Formula Holden before running Dale Brede amongst others in V8 Supercar's Development Series. In 2001, Abrahams stepped away from the sport to focus on his and family business interests.

== Career results ==
Season	Series	Position	Car	Team
1982	Australian Endurance Championship	5th	Ford Escort Mexico	Arthur Abrahams
1982	Australian Endurance Championship - Up to 1600cc Class	**1st**	Ford Escort Mexico	Arthur Abrahams
1982	Perrier Gold Cup	16th	Ford Escort Mexico	Arthur Abrahams
1985	Australian Formula 2 Championship	4th	Cheetah Mk.6 Volkswagen	Arthur Abrahams
1986	Australian Formula 2 Championship	5th	Cheetah Mk.8 Volkswagen	Arthur Abrahams
1987	Australian Formula 2 Championship	**1st**	Cheetah Mk.8 Volkswagen	Arthur Abrahams
1988	Australian Drivers' Championship	9th	Ransberg L5 Volkswagen	Arthur Abrahams
1988	World Sportscar Championship	68th	Spice SE86C; ADA 03	Chamberlain Engineering; ADA Engineering
1994	Australian Drivers' Championship	5th	Reynard 92D Holden	NRC International
1995	Australian Drivers' Championship	4th	Reynard 92D Holden	NRC International
1996	Australian Drivers' Championship	6th	Reynard 92D Holden	NRC International
1999	Australian Drivers' Championship	16th	Reynard 95D Holden	NRC International
2020	Australian GT Championship - Trofeo Challenge	**2nd**	Lamborghini Huracán Super Trofeo Evo	Trofeo Motorsport
2021	GT World Challenge Australia - GT Am	4th	Audi R8 LMS Evo	Canon Foods

=== Complete World Sportscar Championship results ===
(key) (Races in bold indicate pole position) (Races in italics indicate fastest lap)

Year	Team	Car	1	2	3	4	5	6	7	8	9	10	11	DC	Points
1988	Chamberlain Engineering	Spice SE86C	JRZ	JAR	MON	SIL	LMS	BRN	BHT	NUR	SPA	FJI; 19		68th	6
1988	ADA Engineering	ADA 03 - Ford Cosworth											SAN; 7	68th	6

=== Indy Lights results ===
Year	Team	1	2	3	4	5	6	7	8	9	10	11	12	13	Rank	Points	Ref
1989	Baci Racing	PHX	LBH	DET	POR	NHM	TOR	POC	ROA	VAN	MDO	NZR	LS; 14		**NC**	**0**	
1990	Baci Racing	PHX; Ret	LBH	MIL	DET	POR	NHM	TOR	DEN	VAN	ROA	MDO	NZR	LS	**NC**	**0**	

=== Complete Bathurst 1000 results ===
Year	Car#	Team	Car	Co-driver	Overall position	Class position	Laps
1991	43	Brian Bolwell Racing	Ford Sierra RS500	(Australia) Brian Bolwell	DNF	DNF	113

Sporting positions
Preceded by Inaugural title	Australian Endurance Championship - Up to 1600cc Champion; 1982	Succeeded by Incumbent
Preceded by Jonathan Crooke	Australian Formula 2 Championship; Champion; 1987	Succeeded by Rohan Onslow
