= Australian Nations Cup Championship =

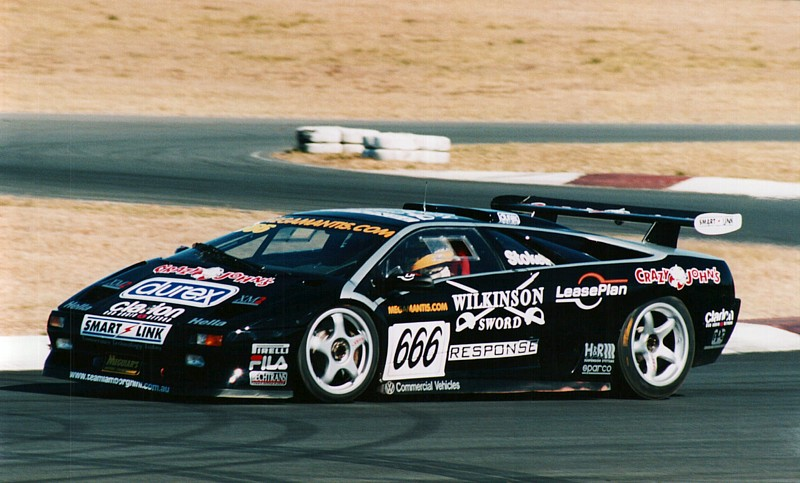
- Paul Stokell won the 2003 and 2004 titles driving a Lamborghini Diablo GTR
- Category: Sports Car Racing; Production Car Racing
- Country: Australia
- Inaugural season: 2000
- Folded: 2004
- Last Drivers' champion: (Australia) Paul Stokell

The Australian Nations Cup Championship was a motor racing title sanctioned by the Confederation of Australian Motor Sport (CAMS) from 2000 to 2004.

== History ==
In the absence of the Australian GT Championship (which had not been run since 1985), Nations Cup became the top CAMS sanctioned championship in Australia for GT style cars. It evolved from the GT Production category, which was created in 1995 by category managers PROCAR Australia. For 2000, PROCAR split the Australian GT Production Car Championship into two separate series so that the more exotic GT cars such as Porsche 911s, Ferrari 360s and Lamborghini Diablo's could compete in the new Australian Nations Cup Championship and the lesser vehicles such as the Mitsubishi Lancers, Subaru Imprezas and HSV's could now compete for outright wins in the revised Australian GT Production Car Championship.

== Cars ==
The cars that regularly competed in the Nations Cup Championships included:

| Manufacturer | Model | Engine | Notes |
|---|---|---|---|
| BMW | Z3 M Coupé GT | 3.2 litre I6 | Nations Cup Group 2 car |
| Chevrolet | Corvette C5 | 5.7 litre V8 | Nations Cup Group 2 car |
| Chrysler | Viper ACR | 8.0 litre V10 | Nations Cup Group 1 car |
| Ferrari | 360 Challenge | 3.6 litre V8 | Nations Cup Group 1 car 2000–2001; Nations Cup Group 2 car 2002–2004 |
| Ferrari | 360 N-GT | 3.6 litre V8 | Nations Cup Group 1 car |
| Ferrari | 550 Millennio | 5.5 litre V12 | Nations Cup Group 1 car |
| Ford | Mustang Cobra R | 5.4 litre V8 | Nations Cup Group 1 car 2001–2002; Nations Cup Group 2 car 2003–2004 |
| Holden | Monaro 427C | 7.0 litre V8 | Nations Cup Group 1 car |
| Honda | NSX Brabham | 3.1 litre V6 | Nations Cup Group 1 car |
| Jaguar | Jaguar XKR-T | 4.0 litre V8 | Nations Cup Group 1 car |
| Lamborghini | Diablo SVR | 5.7 litre V12 | Nations Cup Group 1 car 2000–2002; Nations Cup Group 2 car 2003–2004 |
| Lamborghini | Diablo GTR | 6.0 litre V12 | Nations Cup Group 1 car |
| Maserati | Trofeo | 4.2 litre V8 | Nations Cup Group 2 car |
| Porsche | 911 GT3 R | 3.6 litre H6 | Nations Cup Group 1 car |
| Porsche | 911 GT3 RS | 3.6 litre H6 | Nations Cup Group 1 car |
| Porsche | 911 GT3 Cup | 3.6 litre H6 | Nations Cup Group 2 car |
| Porsche | 911 GT3 Clubsport | 3.6 litre H6 | Nations Cup Group 2 car |
| Porsche | 911 GT2 | 3.6 litre twin-turbo H6 | Nations Cup Group 1 car |
| Porsche | 996 GT3 | 3.6 litre H6 | Nations Cup Group 1 car |

All cars in the Nations Cup Championship were required to use the engines that came with the various road going models, with the exception of the Holden Monaro. In 2002 in an effort to have an Australian car manufacturer competing in the top category and to have them competitive rather than just making up the numbers, PROCAR allowed Holden to use the 7.0 litre, 427 cui GM LS6 V8 engine (as used successfully at Le Mans in the Chevrolet Corvette C5-R and C6-R's) instead of the 5.7 litre Gen III V8 as used in the Monaro CV8 road cars. This caused some controversy as it was felt that allowing Holden to use a larger engine than available in the road cars gave them an advantage over their rivals, with some fans feeling that this decision was a big factor in the eventual demise of the series. PROCAR's given reason was that it allowed the Monaro's to better compete with the V12 and V10 engine cars as well as the lighter V8 and H6 (flat-six) cars.

During practice for the PROCAR run 2002 Bathurst 24 Hour race, triple Nations Cup champion and seven time Bathurst 1000 winner Jim Richards labelled the Monaro as a "Better V8 Supercar" (even though its fastest time around the Mount Panorama Circuit would be some 7 seconds slower than a V8 Supercar at the time), while NC regular and veteran driver John Bowe said that while he had no problems racing against the car, he believed the 7.0 L Monaro was against the spirit of the rules.

Other cars that were eligible to race in Nations Cup, but rarely (if ever) did included the Mosler MT900R, BMW M3 GTR, Nissan Skyline R34 GT-R and Lotus Esprit.

== Demise ==
With the demise of PROCAR during 2004, CAMS revived the Australian GT Championship in 2005 (the first time the championship was run in 20 years) and the series was merged into the grids of the Australian Porsche Drivers Challenge, itself a class of refugees left over after the Australian Carrera Cup Championship replaced the former Porsche Cup. The regulations differed and not all Nations Cup cars were eligible to race in the GT series, the controversial Holden Monaro 427C the most notable such example.

== Championship results ==
The top three placegetters in these five championships were:

| Year | Champion | Car(s) | Runner up | Car(s) | Third place | Car(s) |
|---|---|---|---|---|---|---|
| 2000 | Jim Richards | Porsche 996 GT3 | Peter Fitzgerald | Porsche 996 GT3 | Mark Noske | Ferrari 360 Challenge |
| 2001 | Jim Richards | Porsche 996 GT3 | Paul Stokell | Lamborghini Diablo SVR | Peter Fitzgerald | Porsche 996 GT3 |
| 2002 | Jim Richards | Porsche 996 GT3 | Geoff Morgan | Chrysler Viper ACR | John Bowe | Ferrari 360 N-GT |
| 2003 | Paul Stokell | Lamborghini Diablo GTR | John Bowe | Ferrari 360 N-GT; Chrysler Viper ACR; Porsche 911 GT3 RS | Nathan Pretty | Holden Monaro 427C |
| 2004 | Paul Stokell | Lamborghini Diablo GTR | Nathan Pretty | Holden Monaro 427C | David Stevens | Porsche 911 GT2 |
