= 2001 Clarion Sandown 500 =

Track map of the Sandown Raceway

The 2001 Clarion Sandown 500 was a motor race for production-based Nations Cup cars and GT Production cars. The race, which was the 34th Sandown 500 endurance race, was held at Sandown Raceway in Melbourne, Victoria, Australia on 16 September 2001. It was the first Sandown 500 held since 1998 when it was contested by V8 Supercars.

The race was won by John Bowe and Tom Waring driving a Ferrari 360 Challenge for Prancing Horse Racing.

== Classes ==
Cars competed in four classes:

- Nations Cup
- GT Production Class A
- GT Production Class B
- GT Production Class C

== Budweiser Top Gun Challenge ==
After qualifying was completed the fastest ten cars competed in a one-lap runoff for the top ten grid positions. Runoff results as follows:

Pos	No	Team	Driver	Car	Time
Pole	43	V.I.P. Petfoods	(New Zealand) Jim Richards	Porsche 911 GT3 Type 996	1:16.9760
2	64	Prancing Horse Racing	(Australia) John Bowe	Ferrari 360 Challenge	1:17.3195
3	54	Prancing Horse Racing	(Australia) Paul Morris	Ferrari 360 Challenge	1:17.9148
4	22	Tekno Autosports	(Australia) Neal Bates	Porsche 911 GT3 Type 996	1:18.0764
5	24	Prancing Horse Racing	(New Zealand) Craig Baird	Ferrari 360 Challenge	1:18.1601
6	666	Team Lamborghini Australia	(Australia) Paul Stokell	Lamborghini Diablo GTR	1:18.3006
7	8	Superrint; Yokohama	(Australia) Mark Zonneveld	Porsche 911 GT3 Type 996	1:20.9100
8	20	Poolrite	(Australia) Ian Palmer	Honda NSX Brabham	1:22.3584
9	18	Murray Carter	(Australia) Murray Carter	Chevrolet Corvette C5	1:23.2543
10	7	D'arcy Russell Racing	(Australia) D'arcy Russell	Chrysler Viper ACR	1:25.7557

== Official results ==
Cars failing to complete 75% of winner's distance marked as Not Classified (NC). Race results as follows:

Pos	Class	No	Team	Drivers	Chassis	Laps
Pos	Class	No	Team	Drivers	Engine	Laps
1	N	64	Prancing Horse Racing	(Australia) John Bowe (United Kingdom) Tom Waring	Ferrari 360 Challenge	161
1	N	64	Prancing Horse Racing	(Australia) John Bowe (United Kingdom) Tom Waring	Ferrari 3.6L V8	161
2	N	22	Tekno Autosports	(Australia) Steve Webb (Australia) Neal Bates	Porsche 911 GT3 Type 996	161
2	N	22	Tekno Autosports	(Australia) Steve Webb (Australia) Neal Bates	Porsche 3.6L Flat-6	161
3	N	3	Fitzgerald Racing	(Australia) Peter Fitzgerald (Australia) Geoff Morgan	Porsche 911 GT3 Type 996	159
3	N	3	Fitzgerald Racing	(Australia) Peter Fitzgerald (Australia) Geoff Morgan	Porsche 3.6L Flat-6	159
4	N	54	Prancing Horse Racing	(Australia) Paul Morris (Australia) John Teulan	Ferrari 360 Challenge	156
4	N	54	Prancing Horse Racing	(Australia) Paul Morris (Australia) John Teulan	Ferrari 3.6L V8	156
5	N	8	Superprint; Yokohama	(Australia) Mike Downard (Australia) Mark Zonneveld	Porsche 911 GT3 Type 996	156
5	N	8	Superprint; Yokohama	(Australia) Mike Downard (Australia) Mark Zonneveld	Porsche 3.6L Flat-6	156
6	A	15	Bob Hughes Special Vehicles	(Australia) Bob Hughes (Australia) Rick Bates	Mitsubishi Lancer RS-E Evo VI	150
6	A	15	Bob Hughes Special Vehicles	(Australia) Bob Hughes (Australia) Rick Bates	Mitsubishi 4G63 2.0L Turbo I4	150
7	A	59	Protecnica Racing	(Australia) Wayne Boatright (Australia) Scott Anderson	Subaru Impreza WRX STI	149
7	A	59	Protecnica Racing	(Australia) Wayne Boatright (Australia) Scott Anderson	Subaru 2.0L Turbo Flat-4	149
8	A	16	Robert Lane; Kleenduct	(New Zealand) Damon Templeman (Australia) Peter Phelan	Honda S2000 Sports	146
8	A	16	Robert Lane; Kleenduct	(New Zealand) Damon Templeman (Australia) Peter Phelan	Honda F20C 2.0L I4	146
9	C	62	C + L Racing	(Australia) Scott Loadsman (Australia) Warren Luff	Holden VX Commodore SS 5.7 V8	144
9	C	62	C + L Racing	(Australia) Scott Loadsman (Australia) Warren Luff	Chevrolet LS1 5.7L V8	144
10	A	88	Michael Brock	(Australia) Michael Brock (Australia) Gary Young	Mitsubishi Lancer RS-E Evo V	143
10	A	88	Michael Brock	(Australia) Michael Brock (Australia) Gary Young	Mitsubishi 4G63 2.0L Turbo I4	143
11	C	95	Southern Rural Ford Dealers	(Australia) John McIlroy (Australia) Brett Youlden	Ford AU Falcon XR8	143
11	C	95	Southern Rural Ford Dealers	(Australia) John McIlroy (Australia) Brett Youlden	Ford Windsor 5.0L V8	143
12	A	63	Haysom Motorsport	(Australia) Greg Haysom (Australia) Craig Dean	Nissan 200SX Spec-R	142
12	A	63	Haysom Motorsport	(Australia) Greg Haysom (Australia) Craig Dean	Nissan SR20DET 2.0L Turbo I4	142
13	B	66	Nilsson Motor Sport	(Australia) Len Cave (Australia) Brad Wright	Honda Integra Type-R	142
13	B	66	Nilsson Motor Sport	(Australia) Len Cave (Australia) Brad Wright	Honda B18C 1.8L I4	142
14	B	27	Novacastrian Motorsport	(Australia) Wayne Russell (Australia) Steve Cramp	BMW 323i	141
14	B	27	Novacastrian Motorsport	(Australia) Wayne Russell (Australia) Steve Cramp	BMW M52B25 2.5L I4	141
15	C	69	Parts Plus Racing	(Australia) Kent Youlden (Australia) Luke Youlden	Ford AU Falcon XR8	143
15	C	69	Parts Plus Racing	(Australia) Kent Youlden (Australia) Luke Youlden	Ford Windsor 5.0L V8	143
16	B	13	Osborne Motorsport	(Australia) Colin Osborne (Australia) Ric Shaw	Toyota MR2 Bathurst	131
16	B	13	Osborne Motorsport	(Australia) Colin Osborne (Australia) Ric Shaw	Toyota 3S-GE 2.0L I4	131
17	A	38	Castran Gilbert	(Australia) Dennis Gilbert (Australia) Trevor McGuiness	Mitsubishi Lancer RS-E Evo V	138
17	A	38	Castran Gilbert	(Australia) Dennis Gilbert (Australia) Trevor McGuiness	Mitsubishi 4G63 2.0L Turbo I4	138
18	B	5	MAZ Motor Wreckers	(Australia) Megan Kirkham (Australia) Matt Lehmann (Australia) Phil Kirkham	Mazda MX-5	134
18	B	5	MAZ Motor Wreckers	(Australia) Megan Kirkham (Australia) Matt Lehmann (Australia) Phil Kirkham	Mazda BP 1.8L I4	134
19	N	7	D'arcy Russell Racing	(Australia) D'arcy Russell (Australia) Darren Palmer	Chrysler Viper ACR	123
19	N	7	D'arcy Russell Racing	(Australia) D'arcy Russell (Australia) Darren Palmer	Dodge 8.0L V10	123
DNF	N	43	V.I.P. Petfoods	(New Zealand) Jim Richards (United Kingdom) Tony Quinn	Porsche 911 GT3 Type 996	126
DNF	N	43	V.I.P. Petfoods	(New Zealand) Jim Richards (United Kingdom) Tony Quinn	Porsche 3.6L Flat-6	126
NC	C	42	Wincross Motorsport	(Australia) Richard Winston (Australia) Robert Coutts	Holden VT Commodore SS V8	119
NC	C	42	Wincross Motorsport	(Australia) Richard Winston (Australia) Robert Coutts	Holden 5.0L V8	119
NC	B	4	Anton E Mechtler	(Australia) Christian D’Agostin (Australia) David Lawson	Toyota MR2 Bathurst	118
NC	B	4	Anton E Mechtler	(Australia) Christian D’Agostin (Australia) David Lawson	Toyota 3S-GE 2.0L I4	118
DNF	N	24	Prancing Horse Racing	(Australia) Steve Beards (New Zealand) Craig Baird	Ferrari 360 Challenge	108
DNF	N	24	Prancing Horse Racing	(Australia) Steve Beards (New Zealand) Craig Baird	Ferrari 3.6L V8	108
NC	A	57	Corio Auto Parts Plus	(Australia) Graham Alexander (Australia) John Woodberry	Mitsubishi Lancer RS-E Evo V	100
NC	A	57	Corio Auto Parts Plus	(Australia) Graham Alexander (Australia) John Woodberry	Mitsubishi 4G63 2.0L Turbo I4	100
DNF	N	666	Team Lamborghini Australia	(Australia) Paul Stokell (Australia) Steven Johnson	Lamborghini Diablo GTR	89
DNF	N	666	Team Lamborghini Australia	(Australia) Paul Stokell (Australia) Steven Johnson	Lamborghini 5.7L V12	89
NC	A	87	JNB Racing	(Australia) John Falk (Australia) Neil McFadyen (Australia) Ken Lusty	Subaru Impreza WRX STI	87
NC	A	87	JNB Racing	(Australia) John Falk (Australia) Neil McFadyen (Australia) Ken Lusty	Subaru 2.0L Turbo Flat-4	87
DNF	A	9	Prancing Horse Racing	(Australia) Ross Palmer (Australia) David Wood	Ford Mustang Cobra RA	66
DNF	A	9	Prancing Horse Racing	(Australia) Ross Palmer (Australia) David Wood	Ford Modular 5.4L V8	66
DNF	A	61	Team Yamaha	(Australia) Trevor Haines (Australia) Scott Jacob (Australia) Grant Kenny	Subaru Impreza WRX STI	57
DNF	A	61	Team Yamaha	(Australia) Trevor Haines (Australia) Scott Jacob (Australia) Grant Kenny	Subaru 2.0L Turbo Flat-4	57
DNF	A	31	Marget Engineering	(Australia) Drew Marget (Australia) Vince Macaro	Nissan 200SX Spec-R	44
DNF	A	31	Marget Engineering	(Australia) Drew Marget (Australia) Vince Macaro	Nissan SR20DET 2.0L Turbo I4	44
DNF	A	300	Floyd Motorsport	(Australia) Peter Floyd (Australia) Cameron McConville	HSV VX GTS 300kW	43
DNF	A	300	Floyd Motorsport	(Australia) Peter Floyd (Australia) Cameron McConville	Chevrolet LS1 5.7L V8	43
DNF	N	18	Murray Carter	(Australia) Murray Carter (Australia) Kosi Kalaitzidis	Chevrolet Corvette C5	38
DNF	N	18	Murray Carter	(Australia) Murray Carter (Australia) Kosi Kalaitzidis	Chevrolet LS1 5.7L V8	38
DNF	C	79	Sandhurst Golf Estate	(Australia) Alan Holgersson (Australia) Jeremy Mantello (Australia) Les Walmsley	Toyota Camry CSi V6	27
DNF	C	79	Sandhurst Golf Estate	(Australia) Alan Holgersson (Australia) Jeremy Mantello (Australia) Les Walmsley	Toyota 1MZ-FE 3.0L V6	27
DNF	A	14	Scotts Transport	(Australia) Clyde Lawrence (Australia) Geoff Munday	Subaru Impreza WRX STI	15
DNF	A	14	Scotts Transport	(Australia) Clyde Lawrence (Australia) Geoff Munday	Subaru 2.0L Turbo Flat-4	15
DNF	B	44	Thrifty Car Rental	(Australia) Alan Shephard (Australia) Steve Briffa	Honda Integra Type-R	14
DNF	B	44	Thrifty Car Rental	(Australia) Alan Shephard (Australia) Steve Briffa	Honda B18C 1.8L I4	14
DNF	A	28	Ross Palmer Motorsport	(Australia) Wayne Park (Australia) Anton Mechtler	Honda S2000 Sports	12
DNF	A	28	Ross Palmer Motorsport	(Australia) Wayne Park (Australia) Anton Mechtler	Honda F20C 2.0L I4	12
DNF	N	20	Palmer Promotions	(Australia) Ian Palmer (Australia) Brett Peters	Honda NSX Brabham	12
DNF	N	20	Palmer Promotions	(Australia) Ian Palmer (Australia) Brett Peters	Honda C32B 3.2L V6	12
DNF	A	34	King Springs; Delphi	(Australia) Mark King (Australia) Rod Wilson	Mitsubishi Lancer RS-E Evo V	0
DNF	A	34	King Springs; Delphi	(Australia) Mark King (Australia) Rod Wilson	Mitsubishi 4G63 2.0L Turbo I4	0
DNS	A	17	Quirks Refrigeration	(Australia) Peter Boylan (Australia) Trevor Scheumack	BMW M3	
DNS	A	17	Quirks Refrigeration	(Australia) Peter Boylan (Australia) Trevor Scheumack	BMW I6	

== Statistics ==
- Provisional Pole Position - #666 Paul Stokell - 1:16.4012
- Pole Position - #43 Jim Richards - 1:16.9760
- Fastest Lap - #7 D'arcy Russell - 1:17.7024
- Race Average Speed - 143.22 km/h

Preceded by 1998 Tickford 500	Sandown 500; 2001	Succeeded by 2002 Sandown 500
