= 2002 Sandown 500 =

Track map of the Sandown Raceway

The 2002 Sandown 500 was an Australian motor race for Production Cars. Organised by Procar Australia, it drew its entries from those competing in the Australian Nations Cup Championship and Australian GT Production Car Championship. It was the second Sandown 500 since the former touring car endurance race was revived for production cars and would be the last as Sandown would regain the rights to the 500 kilometre V8 Supercar race the following year.

The race, which was the 35th Sandown 500 endurance race was held at Sandown Raceway in Melbourne, Victoria, Australia on 8 September 2002. It was won by Paul Stokell and Anthony Tratt driving a Lamborghini Diablo GTR.

== Classes ==
Cars competed in four classes:

- Nations Cup Group 1
- Nations Cup Group 2
- GT Production Class A
- GT Production Class B

== Sandown 500 Top Gun Challenge ==
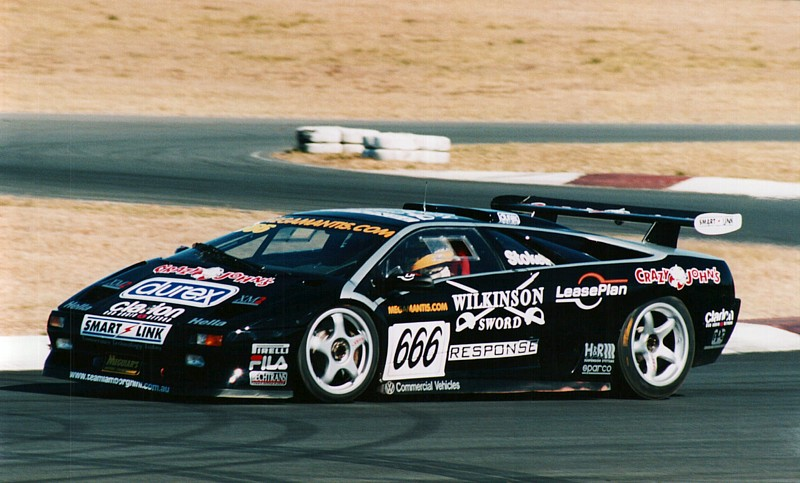
Paul Stokell and Anthony Tratt won the race driving a Lamborghini Diablo GTR similar to that pictured above

After qualifying was completed the fastest ten cars competed in a one-lap runoff for the top ten grid positions. Runoff results as follows:

Weather conditions were threatening when the runoff started. Former Australian rules football player turned media personality Sam Newman, who by his own admission was not even a good race driver, let alone a professional one, was the first driver out to set a time in the runoff in his Class G2 Ferrari 360 Challenge. As it turned out, his was the only lap run in dry conditions as the rain started almost as he crossed the finish line. His lap ended up being the fastest by 6.0448 seconds.

| Pos | No | Entrant | Driver | Car | Time |
|---|---|---|---|---|---|
| 1 | 17 | Prancing Horse Racing | (Australia) Sam Newman | Ferrari 360 Challenge | 1:18.5170 |
| 2 | 5 | V.I.P. Petfoods (Aust) P/L | (New Zealand) Jim Richards | Porsche 911 GT3 Cup Type 996 | 1:24.5618 |
| 3 | 54 | Prancing Horse Racing | (Australia) Paul Morris | Ferrari 360 Challenge | 1:25.6568 |
| 4 | 888 | Prancing Horse Racing | (Australia) John Bowe | Ferrari 360 N-GT | 1:26.3881 |
| 5 | 88 | Prancing Horse Racing | (Australia) Brad Jones | Ferrari 360 N-GT | 1:26.8075 |
| 6 | 2 | Crazy John's; Team Lamborghini Australia | (Australia) Paul Stokell | Lamborghini Diablo GTR | 1:27.2870 |
| 7 | 3 | Falken Tyres; Fitzgerald Racing | (Australia) Peter Fitzgerald | Porsche 911 GT3 Cup Type 996 | 1:28.0665 |
| 8 | 7 | D'arcy Russell Racing | (Australia) D'arcy Russell | Chrysler Viper ACR | 1:34.1841 |
| 9 | 34 | King Springs; Delphi | (Australia) Mark King | Mitsubishi Lancer RS-E Evo VII | 1:41.5410 |
| DNS | 300 | Floyd Motorsport | (Australia) Peter Floyd | HSV VX GTS 300kW | |

== Official results ==
Cars failing to complete 75% of winner's distance marked as Not Classified (NC). Race results as follows:

| Pos | Class | No | Entrant | Drivers | Chassis | Laps |
| Pos | Class | No | Entrant | Drivers | Engine | Laps |
|---|---|---|---|---|---|---|
| 1 | G1 | 2 | Crazy John's; Team Lamborghini Australia | (Australia) Paul Stokell (Australia) Anthony Tratt | Lamborghini Diablo GTR | 161 |
| 1 | G1 | 2 | Crazy John's; Team Lamborghini Australia | (Australia) Paul Stokell (Australia) Anthony Tratt | Lamborghini 5.7L V12 | 161 |
| 2 | G1 | 5 | V.I.P. Petfoods (Aust) P/L | (New Zealand) Jim Richards (United Kingdom) Tony Quinn | Porsche 911 GT3 Cup Type 996 | 161 |
| 2 | G1 | 5 | V.I.P. Petfoods (Aust) P/L | (New Zealand) Jim Richards (United Kingdom) Tony Quinn | Porsche 3.8L Flat-6 | 161 |
| 3 | G1 | 888 | Prancing Horse Racing | (Australia) John Bowe (Australia) Steve Beards | Ferrari 360 N-GT | 160 |
| 3 | G1 | 888 | Prancing Horse Racing | (Australia) John Bowe (Australia) Steve Beards | Ferrari 3.6L V8 | 160 |
| 4 | G1 | 3 | Falken Tyres; Fitzgerald Racing | (Australia) Peter Fitzgerald (Australia) Matthew Coleman | Porsche 911 GT3 Cup Type 996 | 158 |
| 4 | G1 | 3 | Falken Tyres; Fitzgerald Racing | (Australia) Peter Fitzgerald (Australia) Matthew Coleman | Porsche 3.8L Flat-6 | 158 |
| 5 | G2 | 54 | Prancing Horse Racing | (Australia) Paul Morris (Australia) John Teulan | Ferrari 360 Challenge | 155 |
| 5 | G2 | 54 | Prancing Horse Racing | (Australia) Paul Morris (Australia) John Teulan | Ferrari 3.6L V8 | 155 |
| 6 | G2 | 17 | Prancing Horse Racing | (Australia) Sam Newman (Australia) Scott Shearman | Ferrari 360 Challenge | 153 |
| 6 | G2 | 17 | Prancing Horse Racing | (Australia) Sam Newman (Australia) Scott Shearman | Ferrari 3.6L V8 | 153 |
| 7 | A | 57 | Corio Auto Parts Plus | (Australia) Graham Alexander (Australia) John Wodberry | Mitsubishi Lancer RS-E Evo V | 147 |
| 7 | A | 57 | Corio Auto Parts Plus | (Australia) Graham Alexander (Australia) John Wodberry | Mitsubishi 4G63 2.0L Turbo I4 | 147 |
| 8 | A | 34 | King Springs; Delphi | (Australia) Mark King (Australia) Geoff Full | Mitsubishi Lancer RS-E Evo VII | 146 |
| 8 | A | 34 | King Springs; Delphi | (Australia) Mark King (Australia) Geoff Full | Mitsubishi 4G63 2.0L Turbo I4 | 146 |
| 9 | A | 96 | Don Pulver | (Australia) Don Pulver (Australia) Mark Brame | Nissan 200SX Spec-R | 146 |
| 9 | A | 96 | Don Pulver | (Australia) Don Pulver (Australia) Mark Brame | Nissan SR20DET 2.0L Turbo I4 | 146 |
| 10 | A | 18 | Coopers | (Australia) Michael Brock (Australia) Gary Young | Mitsubishi Lancer RS-E Evo VII | 144 |
| 10 | A | 18 | Coopers | (Australia) Michael Brock (Australia) Gary Young | Mitsubishi 4G63 2.0L Turbo I4 | 144 |
| 11 | A | 38 | Castran Gilbert Pty Ltd | (Australia) Dennis Gilbert (Australia) Trevor McGuiness | Mitsubishi Lancer RS-E Evo VI | 141 |
| 11 | A | 38 | Castran Gilbert Pty Ltd | (Australia) Dennis Gilbert (Australia) Trevor McGuiness | Mitsubishi 4G63 2.0L Turbo I4 | 141 |
| 12 | A | 1 | Century Batteries | (Australia) Gary Deane (Australia) Grant Denyer (Australia) Brett Peters | Subaru Impreza WRX STI | 140 |
| 12 | A | 1 | Century Batteries | (Australia) Gary Deane (Australia) Grant Denyer (Australia) Brett Peters | Subaru 2.0L Turbo Flat-4 | 140 |
| 13 | A | 19 | Yamaha | (Australia) Trevor Haines (Australia) Bob Hughes (Australia) Ed Aitken | Ford Tickford TE50 | 139 |
| 13 | A | 19 | Yamaha | (Australia) Trevor Haines (Australia) Bob Hughes (Australia) Ed Aitken | Ford Windsor 5.6L V8 | 139 |
| 14 | A | 220 | Donut King | (Australia) Tony Alford (Australia) John Grounds (Australia) Michael Robinson | Nissan 200SX Spec-R | 137 |
| 14 | A | 220 | Donut King | (Australia) Tony Alford (Australia) John Grounds (Australia) Michael Robinson | Nissan SR20DET 2.0L Turbo I4 | 137 |
| 15 | G1 | 8 | QBE Insurance | (Australia) John Smith (Australia) Wayne Cooper (Australia) Wayne Boatwright | Porsche 911 GT3 Cup Type 996 | 135 |
| 15 | G1 | 8 | QBE Insurance | (Australia) John Smith (Australia) Wayne Cooper (Australia) Wayne Boatwright | Porsche 3.8L Flat-6 | 135 |
| 16 | B | 28 | Ross Palmer Motorsport | (Australia) James Phillip (Australia) Ken Talbert | Honda S2000 | 133 |
| 16 | B | 28 | Ross Palmer Motorsport | (Australia) James Phillip (Australia) Ken Talbert | Honda F20C 2.0L I4 | 133 |
| 17 | B | 13 | Osborne Motorsport | (Australia) Trevor Keene (Australia) Robert Rubis | Toyota MR2 Bathurst | 131 |
| 17 | B | 13 | Osborne Motorsport | (Australia) Trevor Keene (Australia) Robert Rubis | Toyota 3S-GE 2.0L I4 | 131 |
| 18 | A | 200 | Donut King | (Australia) Greg Haysom (Australia) Rodney Woods (Australia) Craig Dean | Nissan 200SX Spec-R | 124 |
| 18 | A | 200 | Donut King | (Australia) Greg Haysom (Australia) Rodney Woods (Australia) Craig Dean | Nissan SR20DET 2.0L Turbo I4 | 124 |
| DNF | A | 222 | Donut King | (Australia) Len Cave (Australia) Matt Turner | Nissan 200SX Spec-R | 126 |
| DNF | A | 222 | Donut King | (Australia) Len Cave (Australia) Matt Turner | Nissan SR20DET 2.0L Turbo I4 | 126 |
| DNF | B | 66 | Nilsson Motor Sport | (Australia) Klark Quinn (Australia) Mike Kilpatrick (Australia) Andrew Haberfield | Honda Integra Type-R | 107 |
| DNF | B | 66 | Nilsson Motor Sport | (Australia) Klark Quinn (Australia) Mike Kilpatrick (Australia) Andrew Haberfield | Honda B18C 1.8L I4 | 107 |
| NC | A | 23 | Mitsubishi Electric | (Australia) Steve Knight (Australia) Andrew Taplin | Mitsubishi Lancer RS-E Evo VI | 98 |
| NC | A | 23 | Mitsubishi Electric | (Australia) Steve Knight (Australia) Andrew Taplin | Mitsubishi 4G63 2.0L Turbo I4 | 98 |
| DNF | G1 | 88 | Prancing Horse Racing | (Indonesia) Maher Algadrie (Australia) Brad Jones | Ferrari 360 N-GT | 88 |
| DNF | G1 | 88 | Prancing Horse Racing | (Indonesia) Maher Algadrie (Australia) Brad Jones | Ferrari 3.6L V8 | 88 |
| NC | G1 | 7 | D'arcy Russell Racing | (Australia) D'arcy Russell (Australia) Darren Palmer | Chrysler Viper ACR | 82 |
| NC | G1 | 7 | D'arcy Russell Racing | (Australia) D'arcy Russell (Australia) Darren Palmer | Dodge 8.0L V10 | 82 |
| DNF | A | 47 | MGC Racing | (Australia) Mark Cohen (Australia) Philip Polites | HSV VX GTS 300kW | 79 |
| DNF | A | 47 | MGC Racing | (Australia) Mark Cohen (Australia) Philip Polites | Chevrolet LS1 5.7L V8 | 79 |
| DNF | B | 31 | Osborne Motorsport | (Australia) Neil Dunkley (Australia) Steve Drake | Toyota MR2 Bathurst | 64 |
| DNF | B | 31 | Osborne Motorsport | (Australia) Neil Dunkley (Australia) Steve Drake | Toyota 3S-GE 2.0L I4 | 64 |
| DNF | A | 55 | Mortgage House | (Australia) Barrie Nesbitt (Australia) David Lawson (Australia) Mal Rose | HSV VX GTS 300kW | 54 |
| DNF | A | 55 | Mortgage House | (Australia) Barrie Nesbitt (Australia) David Lawson (Australia) Mal Rose | Chevrolet LS1 5.7L V8 | 54 |
| DNF | B | 44 | NEC Projection | (Australia) Chris Poulton (Australia) Richard Hing | Mitsubishi FTO | 18 |
| DNF | B | 44 | NEC Projection | (Australia) Chris Poulton (Australia) Richard Hing | Mitsubishi 6A12 2.0L V6 | 18 |
| DNS | A | 300 | Floyd Motorsport | (Australia) Peter Floyd (Australia) Rod Wilson | HSV VX GTS 300kW | 0 |
| DNS | A | 300 | Floyd Motorsport | (Australia) Peter Floyd (Australia) Rod Wilson | Chevrolet LS1 5.7L V8 | 0 |

== Statistics ==
- Provisional Pole Position - #5 Jim Richards - 1:21.4133
- Pole Position - #17 Sam Newman - 1:18.5170
- Fastest Lap - #5 Jim Richards - 1:13.8765
- Race Average Speed - 139 km/h

| Preceded by 2001 Clarion Sandown 500 | Sandown 500; 2002 | Succeeded by 2003 Betta Electrical Sandown 500 |
