= IFR Aspid =

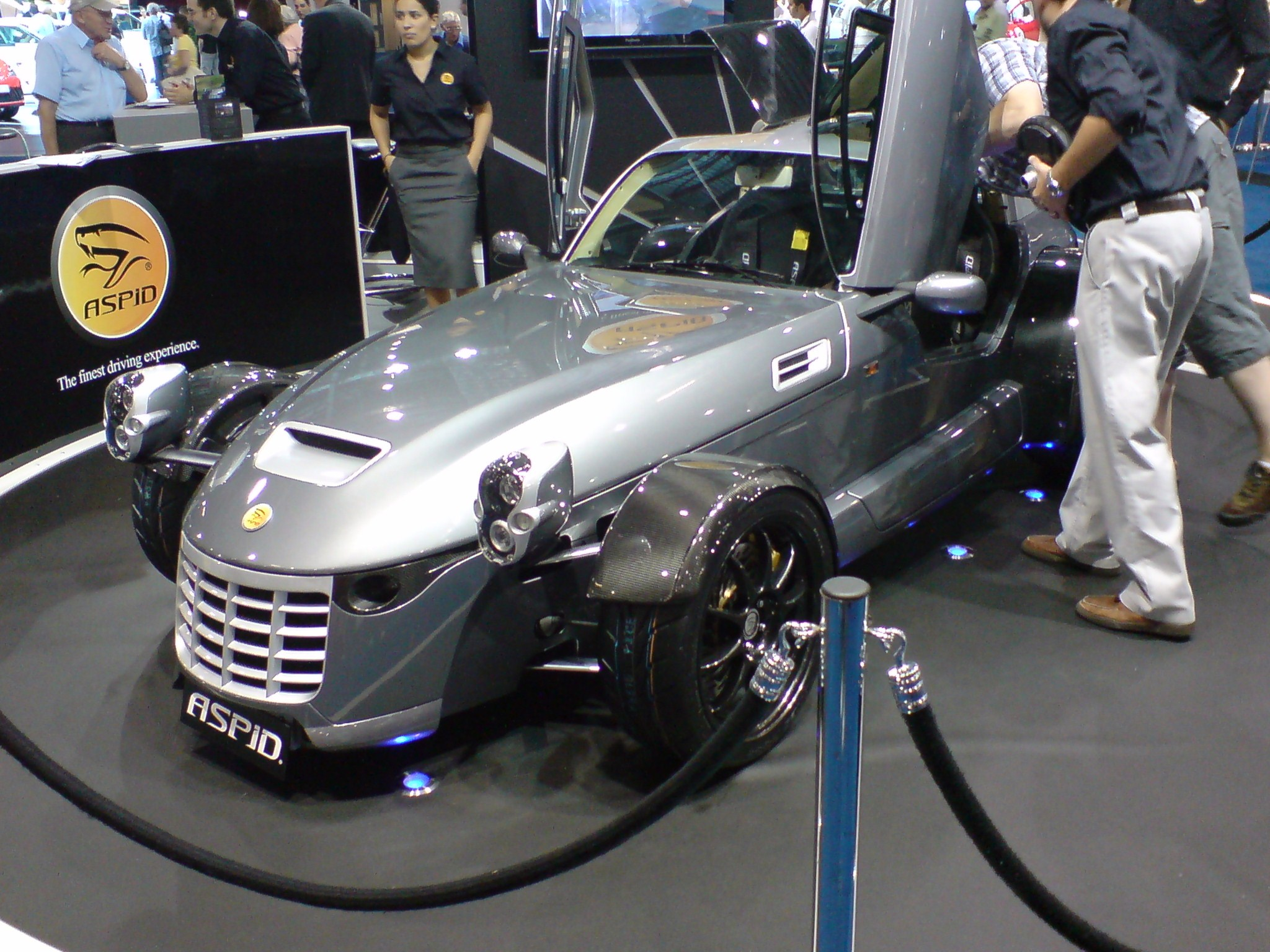
- IFR Aspid debuting at the 2008 British International Motor Show

Overview
- Manufacturer: Aspid
- Production: 2009-
- Designer: Ignacio Fernandez Rodriguez

Body and chassis
- Class: Sports car
- Body style: 2-door coupe
- Layout: FR layout
- Doors: Scissor

Powertrain
- Engine: 1,997cc (2.0L) Honda F20C I4; 1,997cc (2.0L) Supercharged Honda F20C I4 (Supersport)
- Transmission: 6 speed manual

Dimensions
- Wheelbase: 2160mm (85.0 in)
- Width: 1870mm (73.6 in)
- Height: 1160mm (45.7 in)
- Kerb weight: 740 kg (1,631 lbs)

Chronology
- Successor: Aspid GT-21 Invictus

The IFR Aspid is a Spanish open-wheel sports car introduced in 2008. It was available in two models, Sport and Supersport, which had base prices of £75,000 and £107,000 respectively. The Aspid was originally developed as a showcase of the technology developed by IFR, an automotive consultancy group. The Aspid gets its name from the Spanish word for the small and very quick snake that killed Cleopatra.

== Performance ==
The Aspid is powered by the 2.0 L Honda F20C I4 engine used in the Honda S2000, which has been tuned and fitted with a dry sump by IFR to produce 270 hp (201 kW) in naturally aspirated base trim and 400 hp (298 kW) in supercharged, Supersport trim. The naturally aspirated version is capable of 0-62 mph (100 km/h) in 3.9 seconds with the supercharged version taking 2.8 seconds, with both sharing the Honda S2000's 9,000 rpm redline. In corners the Aspid can pull 1.6g of lateral acceleration, it has a claimed top speed of 250 km/h (155 mph), and it can decelerate from 160 km/h (99 mph) to 0 in 3.1 seconds. Mechanically the Aspid also uses the 6 speed manual from the Honda S2000 with the only other powertrain upgrade coming in the form of a custom exhaust system.

== Technical innovation ==
One of the aspects which IFR has focused heavily on whilst marketing the Aspid is the fact that it holds four unique patents for technologies used throughout the car. The first patent is for a twin brake disc (TBD) system, consisting of two lightweight stainless steel discs with large turbine shaped slots designed to maximize brake cooling and efficiency as well as to be a claimed 70% lighter than a conventional brake disc setup. The second patent is for the aluminum extrusion chassis, developed for maximum rigidity and to fit the Aspid's double wishbone suspension system. The chassis then has a lightweight aluminum honeycomb overlaid on top for added strength. With these advancements IFR has been able to reduce the weight of the Aspid's chassis to only 75 kg (165 lb). The third patent is for Dual Lip Reinforcement (DLR) wishbones which used almond shaped spars with strengthening beams going through the centers to improve rigidity and aerodynamics. Lastly, the 4th patent is for a modular wiring loom which cuts the amount of harness needed to 1/3 of what it originally was as well as reduce its weight by 70%. The Aspid also uses a removable F1 style carbon fiber steering wheel complete with data logging and telemetry abilities as well as a slew of other features to control various aspects of the car such as rev limit, ride height, brake balance, valve timing and others, which is a feature seldom used in street cars. Additionally the Aspid is fully compliant with FIA safety regulations, as well as European homologation standards, from stock and as such can be taken to the track and raced with little additional modification needed.

== Media ==
The Aspid received a lot of press attention when it debuted in 2008 from motoring publications, such as Evo, Autocar, Car Magazine, Motor Trend and others, who praised the Aspid highly for its technological innovation as well as its level of comfort and amenities relative to other open-wheel cars on the market. Many reviewers did lament the pricing, however, often highlighting the affordability of other open-wheeled cars and comparing the Aspid to a more advanced and luxurious, albeit higher priced, version of the Caterham 7.
