= Shigeru Uehara =

Japanese automotive engineer (born 1947)

Shigeru Uehara (上原 繁, Uehara Shigeru; born September 5, 1947 in Tokyo) is a Japanese automotive engineer. He was the project leader of the Honda NSX, and chief engineer of the Honda S2000.

== Career ==
Shigeru Uehara began his career at Honda R&D Co., Ltd in 1971, and went on to become the company's specialist in vehicle stability and handling performance. In 1985 he was appointed Large Project Leader for the mid-ship research project that led to the NSX project in 1990. Amongst his many contributions to the company, Uehara led Honda's sports car development projects of three very important projects at Honda R&D, and saw them from conception to ending culminating in the S2000, Honda Integra Type R (DC2/DC5) and the NSX-R. He is also known for his close friendship with the late Ayrton Senna.

Shigeru Uehara completed the S2000 CR as his last project before retirement. The color of Apex Blue is his favorite color, the tires are made with the same tread design as the NSX-R's Potenza's which he helped design, and the purpose built body kit produces much rear-end down-force at speed. Also, the shocks and springs are stiffer than the standard S2000. Uehara called the S2000 CR his final gift before retirement.
