= Aspid GT-21 Invictus =

Overview
- Manufacturer: Aspid
- Production: 2013–
- Assembly: Spain

Body and chassis
- Class: Sports car (S)
- Body style: 2-door coupé
- Layout: Front-engine, rear-wheel drive

Powertrain
- Engine: 4.4 L V8

Dimensions
- Wheelbase: 2,560 mm (100.79 in)
- Length: 4,447 mm (175.08 in)
- Width: 1,902 mm (74.88 in)
- Height: 1,226 mm (48.27 in)
- Curb weight: 990 kg (2,180 lb) (dry)

Chronology
- Predecessor: IFR Aspid

The Aspid GT-21 Invictus is a sportscar from Spanish automotive manufacturer Aspid, creators of the 2008 IFR Aspid. Like their previous model, the GT-21 is an open-wheel car.

It is powered by a BMW 4.4-litre V8 engine producing 450 horsepower. The output is directed to the rear wheels via either a seven-speed dual-clutch transmission or a six-speed manual. Because the vehicle weighs less than 2,182 pounds (990 kg) thanks to the use of composites and aluminum, plus technologies borrowed from the aerospace industry, its 0–60 mph (0–97 km/h) time is under 3 seconds, with a top speed of 187 mph (301 km/h). Aspid promises superior cornering abilities for the GT-21 Invictus, with a maximum lateral grip of up to 1.5 G.

The occupancy space allows for seats to be rearranged to accommodate two backseat passengers and its boot-size of 275 liters allows the Invictus to be used for short trips and getaways during the weekend. Aspid offers buyers of the Invictus model the option to collaborate with the brand's engineers to customize the mechanical specifications of their car. Additionally, customers can choose to pick up their vehicle directly from the factory, where they will receive a book about the construction of the Invictus, complete with signatures from the assembly team.

Aspid planned to produce 250 models a year, but it is unclear if any were actually produced.
