= Aspid =

Spanish automobile manufacturer

IFR Automotive, S.L.
- Type: Sociedad limitada
- Industry: Automotive
- Founded: 2003; 23 years ago
- Founder: Ignacio Fernández Rodríguez
- Headquarters: Reus, Catalonia, Spain
- Products: Automobiles
- Website: www.aspidcars.com

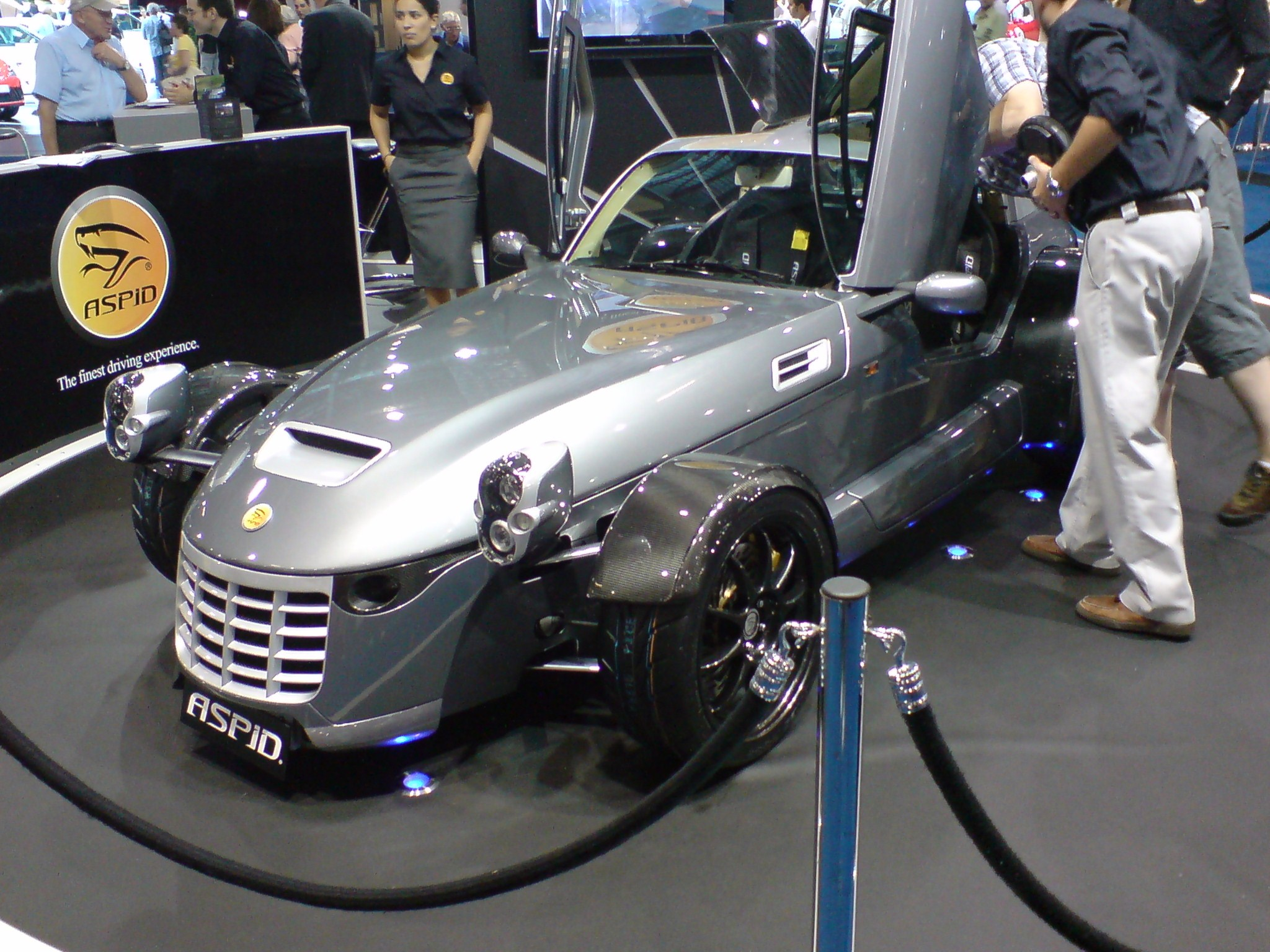
IFR Aspid

Aspid is the trading name of IFR Automotive, S.L., a Spanish automobile manufacturer. The company was founded in by 2003 by Ignacio Fernández Rodríguez.

The name of the company comes from the viper species (Vipera aspis) found in northern Spain—where the company is based.

== See also ==
- IFR Aspid
- Aspid GT-21 Invictus
