= Mean piston speed =

Average speed of the piston in a reciprocating engine

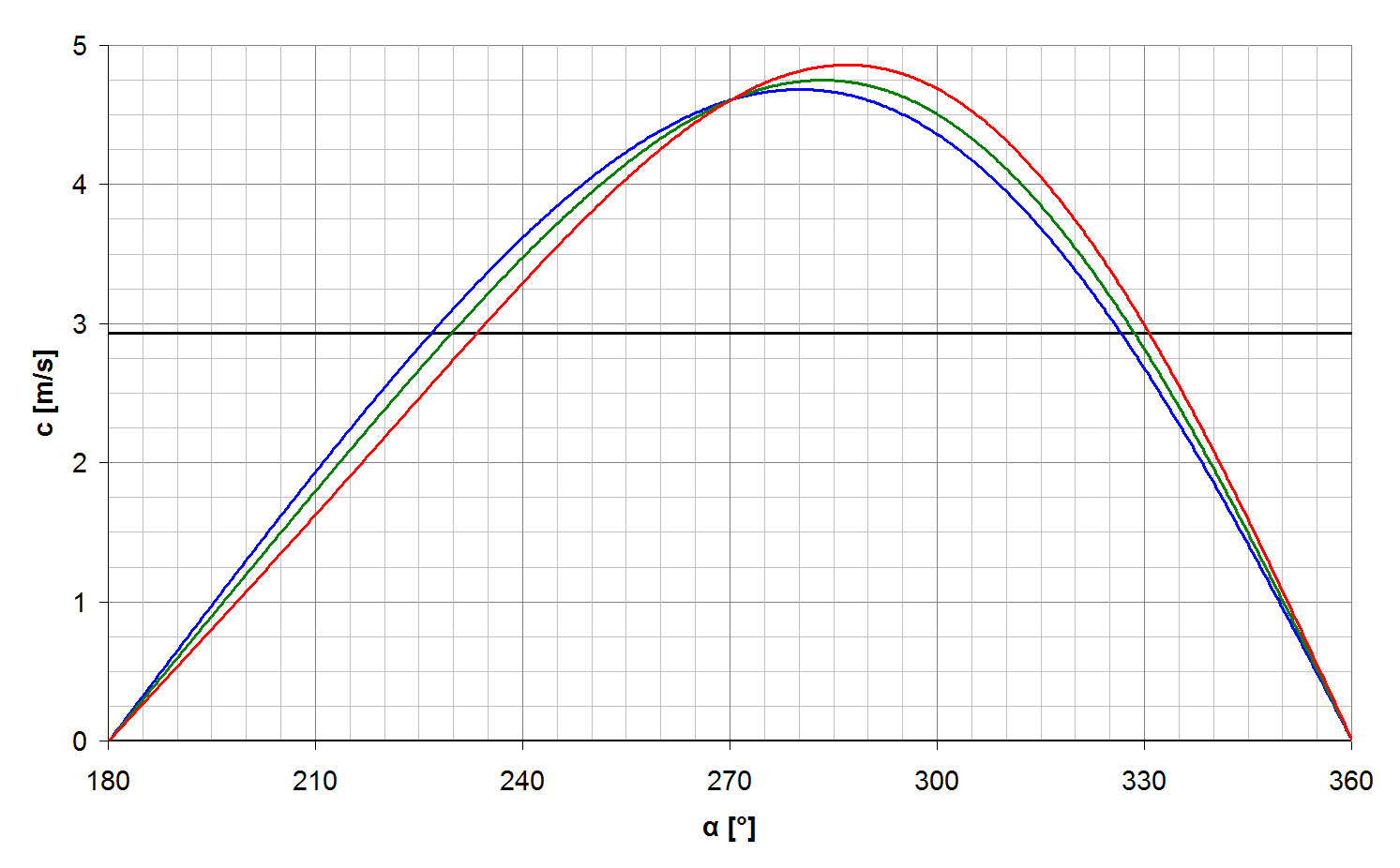
The comparison of mean piston speed (black line) with real piston speed (color lines). Diagram shows one stroke from BDC to TDC. Revolution = 1.000 min-1, stroke = 88 mm. The connecting rod ratio l/r varies: 3 - red, 4 - green, 5,5 - blue

The mean piston speed is the average speed of the piston in a reciprocating engine. It is a function of stroke and RPM. There is a factor of 2 in the equation to account for one stroke to occur in 1/2 of a crank revolution (or alternatively: two strokes per one crank revolution) and a '60' to convert seconds from minutes in the RPM term.

$$V_\text{mean} = 2*\frac{\text{Stroke [mm]}}{1000} * \frac{\text{RPM}}{60}$$

For example, a piston in an automobile engine which has a stroke of 90 mm will have a mean speed at 3000 rpm of 2 * (90 / 1000) * 3000 / 60 = 9 m/s.

The 5.2-liter V10 that debuted in the 2009 Audi R8 has the highest mean piston speed for any production car (26.9 m/s) thanks to its 92.8 mm stroke and 8700-rpm redline.

== Classes ==
low speed diesels
~8.5 m/s for marine and electric power generation applications
medium speed diesels
~11 m/s for trains or trucks
high speed diesel
~14–17 m/s for automobile engines
medium speed petrol
~16 m/s for automobile engines
high speed petrol
~20–25 m/s for sport automobile engines or motorcycles
competition
Some extreme examples are NASCAR Sprint Cup Series and Formula one engines with ~25 m/s and Top Fuel and MotoGP engines ~30 m/s

The mean of any function refers to the average value. In the case of mean piston speed, taken in a narrow mathematical sense, it is zero because half of the time the piston is moving up and half of the time the piston is moving down; this is not useful. The way the term is usually used is to describe the distance traveled by the piston per unit of time, taking distance positive in both up and down senses. It is related to the rate that friction work is done on the cylinder walls, and thus the rate that heat is generated there.This is sort of a non-puzzle. It represents a specification to be designed to rather than as a result of design and the mean piston velocity is a function of the revolutions per minute, that is, the piston at a specific rpm is going to be the same at the peak of the graph as it is at the trough, that is at 286.071 degrees on the crankshaft if the rpm is held consistent. At 0 and 180 degrees, the piston velocity is zero.Piston velocity is a test of the strength of the piston and connecting rod subassembly. The alloy used to make the piston itself is what determines the maximum velocity that the piston can reach before friction coefficients, heat levels and reciprocating stress overcome the maximum levels that the piston can sustain before it begins to fail structurally. As the alloy tends to be fairly consistent across most manufacturers, the maximum velocity of the piston at a given rpm is determined by the length of the stroke, that is, the radius of the journal of the crankshaft. The most common engine types in production are built to square, or below square. That is, a square engine has the same diameter of cylinder bore as the total length of the stroke from 0 to 180 degrees, whereas in an undersquare engine, the total length of the stroke is greater than the diameter of the bore. The opposite, oversquare, is mostly used in higher performance engines where the torque curve approaches the peak of the maximum piston velocity. Generally in this type of engine, the volume of the cylinder can be artificially enhanced with turbochargers or superchargers, increasing the amount of fuel/air available for combustion.An example is found in Formula 1 racing engines, where the cylinder diameter is substantially greater than the length of the strokeresulting in higher available rpm but necessitating greater requirements of the strengths of connecting rods and pistons and higher temperature tolerances for bearings. The cylinder diameter in these engines are fairly small (under 45 mm) and the stroke is less than that, depending on the torque curve and maximum available rpm as designed by the builder. Peak torque is reached at higher rpm and is spread over a wider range of rpm. The specifications of these are known factors and can be designed to. Torque is a function of the length of the stroke, the shorter the stroke, the less available torque at lower rpm, but the piston velocity can be taken to much greater speeds, meaning higher engine rpm. These types of engines are much more delicate and require a much higher level of precision in the moving parts than square or undersquare engines. Up until the early 1960s, the focus by designers was on torque rather than piston velocity, probably due to material considerations and machining technologies. As materials have improved, engine rpm has increased.
