= Honda F20C engine =

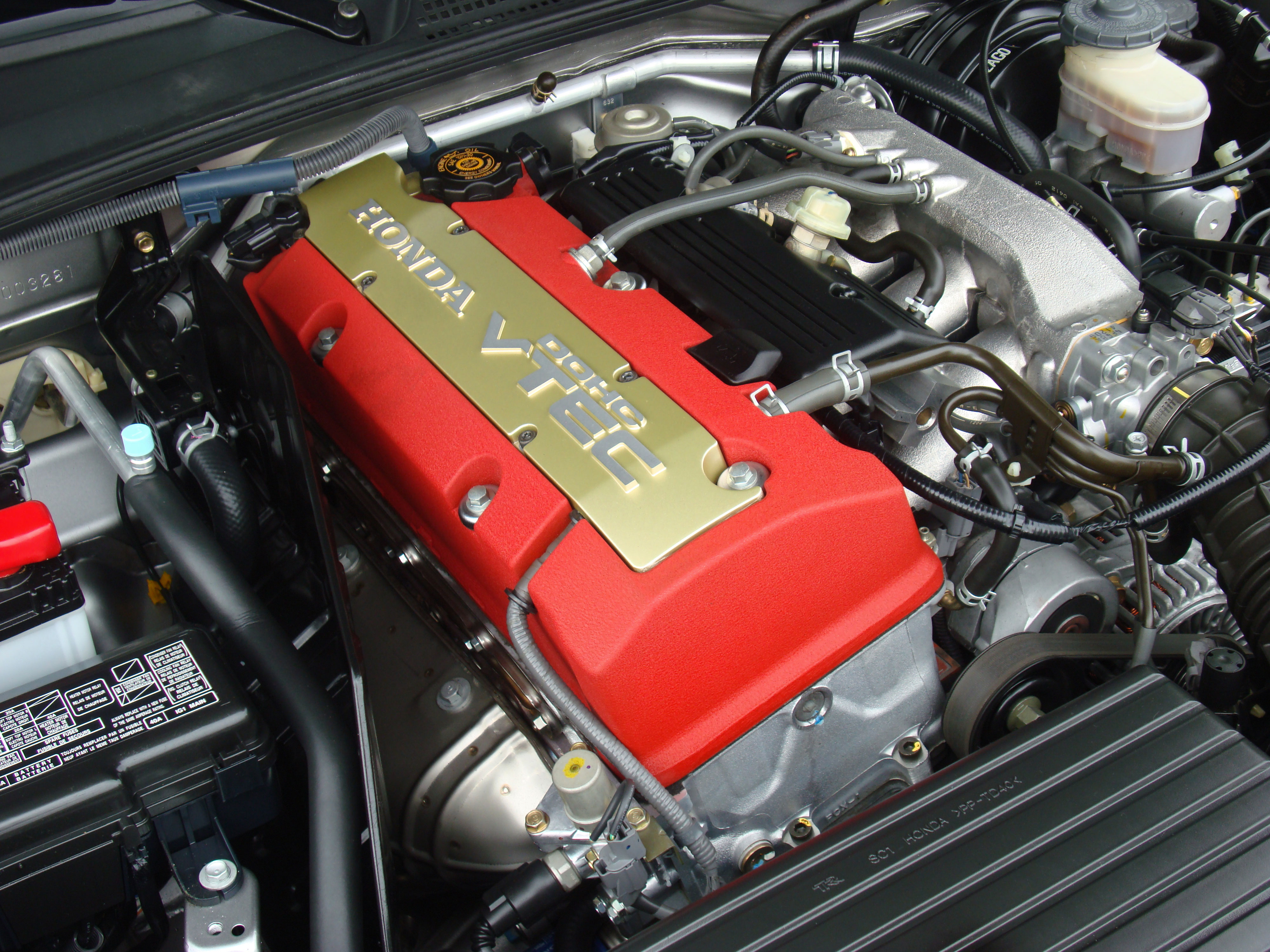
- F22C1 engine

Overview
- Manufacturer: Honda
- Production: 1999–2009

Layout
- Configuration: Naturally-aspirated Inline-4
- Displacement: 2.0 L; 121.9 cu in (1,997 cc) (F20C); 2.2 L; 131.6 cu in (2,157 cc) (F22C1)
- Cylinder bore: 87 mm (3.43 in)
- Piston stroke: 84 mm (3.31 in) (F20C); 90.7 mm (3.57 in) (F22C1)
- Cylinder block material: Aluminum
- Cylinder head material: Aluminum
- Valvetrain: DOHC 4 valves x cyl. with VTEC
- Compression ratio: F20C: 11.7:1 (Japan), 11.0:1 (North America, Europe); F22C1: 11.1:1 (North America, Japan)

RPM range
- Max. engine speed: 8,800 (F20C), 8,000 (F22C1)

Combustion
- Fuel system: Fuel injection
- Fuel type: Gasoline
- Cooling system: Water-cooled with water-cooled oil filter base plate

Output
- Power output: 237–247 bhp (177–184 kW; 240–250 PS)
- Torque output: 150–162 lb⋅ft (203–220 N⋅m)

Chronology
- Predecessor: Honda F engine

The F20C and F22C1 were inline-4 engines produced by Honda for use in the Honda S2000. They are one of the few Honda 4-cylinder automobile engines that are designed to sit longitudinally for rear wheel drive.

These engines are related to the F-series engines found in the mid-1990s Honda Accord and Prelude. To get most out of the compact-sized engine, Honda engineers utilized technology derived from Honda's racing engines. The F20C and F22C1 have two overhead cams with roller followers, a ladder-frame main bearing stiffener, a VTEC system for both the intake and exhaust camshaft, Fiber-Reinforced Metal cylinder liners (FRM), Forged aluminum molybdenum disulfide-coated piston skirts for reduced friction, and uses a timing chain.

The VTEC system consists of two separate cam lobe profiles. Variable cam phasing is not used. Roller followers are used to reduce friction in the valvetrain. The rocker arms are constructed using metal injection molding.

The engine block is constructed of aluminum with a fiber-reinforced metal sleeve. A timing chain drives an intermediate gear, which drives the cams. The pistons are forged aluminum. The intake plenum was designed with minimal volume for fast engine response, and a 14 lb (6.4 kg) flywheel was fitted until 2004. A high-flow catalyst is supplied along with an exhaust air-injection system, which greatly decreases catalyst light-off time and cold emissions.

== F20C ==
- Rod length: 153 mm (approximately 6.024 in)
- Rod/stroke ratio: approximately 1.8214:1
- Power:
  - JDM 250 PS (184 kW; 247 hp) at 8,300 rpm & 161 lb⋅ft (218 N⋅m) at 7,500 rpm
  - USDM 179 kW (240 hp) at 8,300 rpm; 155 lb⋅ft (210 N⋅m) at 7,500 rpm
- Rev limit: 9,150 rpm
- VTEC actuates between 5,500 and 6,000 rpm depending on ECU triggers.

The F20C was designed with high engine speed capability in mind, for increased power output; the rev limit is 9,150 rpm, with VTEC engagement at ≈ 6,000 rpm. Its relatively long stroke of 84 mm results in a mean piston speed of 4,965 ft/m, or 25.2 m/s, which was higher than any other production car to date. Power output is 234 bhp (174 kW; 237 PS) at 8,300 rpm in North America and Europe. The Japanese version, which has a higher compression ratio, is capable of 247 bhp (184 kW; 250 PS) at 8,300 rpm. Honda's F20C Engine won a spot on Wards' 10 Best Engines List twice, in 2000 and 2001.

The engine displaces 2.0 L; 121.9 cu in (1,997 cc), lending to the Honda S2000's name. This method of naming follows suit with the rest of the Honda S roadsters (i.e. Honda S500, S600, and S800).

Applications:

- 1999-2005 Honda S2000 (Japan)
- 2000-2003 Honda S2000 (North America)
- 1999–2009 Honda S2000 (United Kingdom, Europe, Australia)
- 2009 IFR Aspid
- 2009 Skelta G-Force

The F20C produces the highest specific power output for any naturally aspirated piston engine in a car priced under US$100,000, at 125 hp (126.7 PS; 93.2 kW) per liter, ahead of the SR16VE N1 found in the homologation version of the JDM Nissan Pulsar producing 197 bhp (147 kW; 200 PS) for a specific power of 123.45 bhp (92.1 kW; 125.2 PS) per liter. Honda's F20C engine held the record for producing the highest specific power output for any mass production naturally aspirated piston engine in a car, at 125 HP/L, until Ferrari began production of the 458 Italia in 2010, which produced 126 HP/L.

Although designed at the end of the previous century, the F20C is still one of the highest (naturally aspirated) output per liter and the highest revving mass production engines ever made. In recognition of its output per liter and other characteristics, the Honda S2000's engine has won the International Engine of the Year category for 1.8 to 2.2-liter engines five times in its lifetime (from 2000 to 2004).

== F22C1 ==
- Rod length: 149.65 mm (approximately 5.892 in)
- Rod/stroke ratio: approximately 1.6499:1
- Power:
  - USDM 237 hp (177 kW; 240 PS) at 7,800 rpm; 162 lb⋅ft (220 N⋅m) at 6,500 rpm (revised to 237 hp (177 kW; 240 PS) at 7,800 rpm in 2005 per SAE Certified Power standard)
- Rev limit: 8,200 rpm
- VTEC: "6,000 rpm"

In 2004, Honda produced a stroked 90.7 mm (3.57 in) version of the F20C, increasing displacement by 160 cc (9.8 cu in) to 2.2 L; 131.6 cu in (2,156 cc). Dubbed the F22C1, it was originally designed for the North American market being introduced for the 2004 model year. Maximum power output was maintained at 240 hp (179 kW; 243 PS) at 7,800 rpm. Rated torque increased from 155 lb⋅ft (210 N⋅m) at 7,500 rpm for the F20C to 162 lb⋅ft (220 N⋅m) at 6,500 rpm for the F22C. The redline was reduced from 8,900 rpm to 8,200 rpm, mandated by the longer travel distance of the pistons. Peak horsepower output was originally rated identical to the F20C, with "overall powerband characteristics strengthened 4% to 10% between 1,000 -8,000 rpm".

The F22C1 was used exclusively in the North American market for 2004 and 2005 with the F20C being used in all other markets. In 2006, the engine fully replaced F20C engines in the Japanese market as well which resulted in a drop in rated power output from 250 PS (184 kW; 247 bhp) to 240 PS (177 kW; 237 bhp). Outside Japan and the United States, the F20C continued to be the only available engine.

Applications:

- 2004–2009 Honda S2000 (F22C1) (North America)
- 2006–2009 Honda S2000 (Japan)

== See also ==
- List of Honda engines
