= Honda S2000 =

Sports car manufactured by Honda 1999–2009

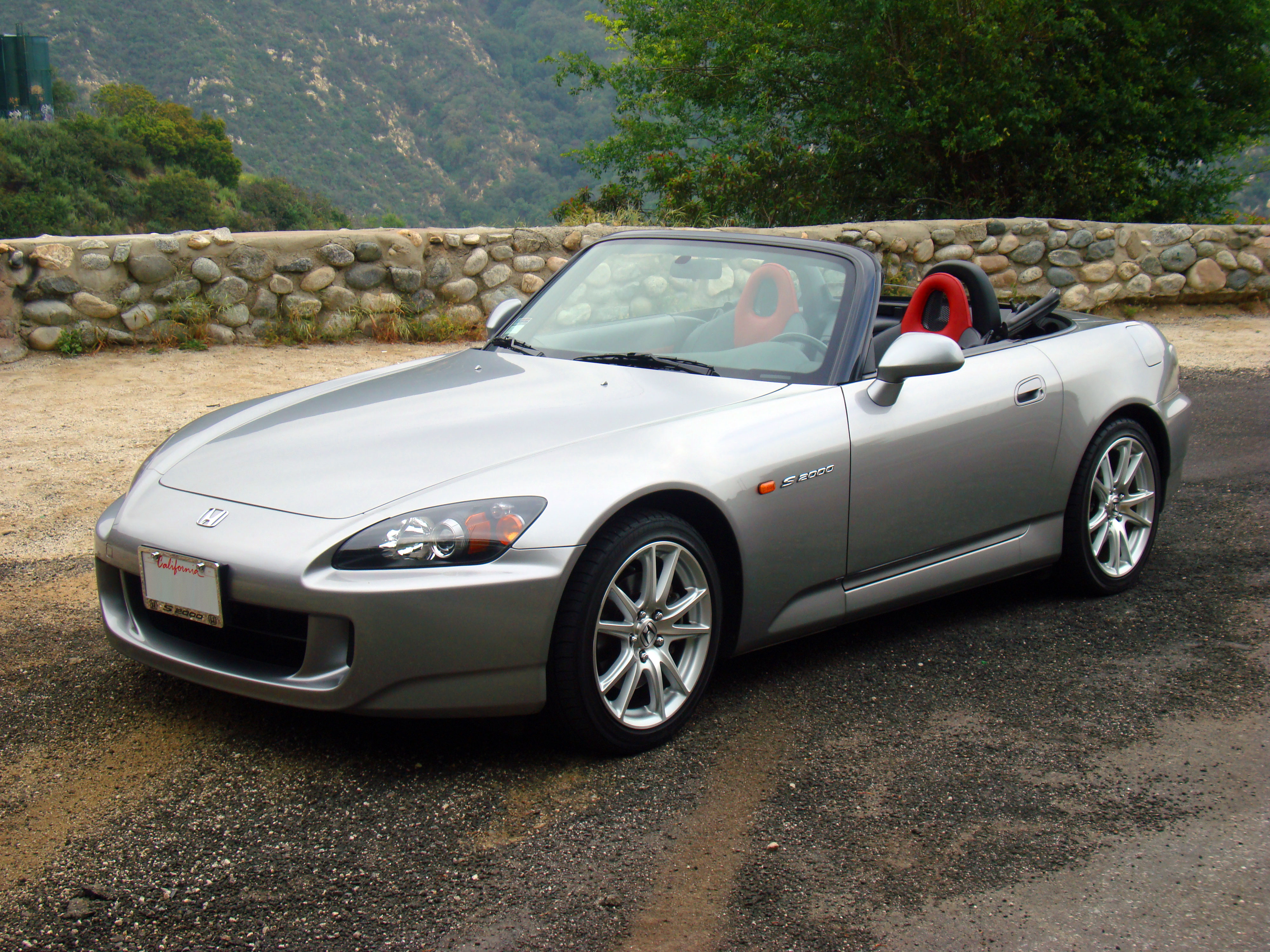
- 2005 Honda S2000 (AP2)

Overview
- Manufacturer: Honda
- Production: 1999–2009 (110,673 produced)
- Designer: Shigeru Uehara (1995)

Body and chassis
- Class: Sports car (S)
- Body style: 2-door roadster / Detachable hardtop
- Layout: Front mid-engine, rear-wheel-drive

Chronology
- Predecessor: Honda S800

The Honda S2000 is a front-mid engine open top sports car that was manufactured by Japanese automobile manufacturer Honda, from 1999 until 2009. First shown as a concept car called the SSM at the Tokyo Motor Show in 1995, the production version was launched on April 15, 1999, to celebrate the company's 50th anniversary. The S2000 is named for its engine displacement of two liters, while "S" stood for "sports" carrying on in the tradition of the S500, S600, and S800 roadsters of the 1960s.

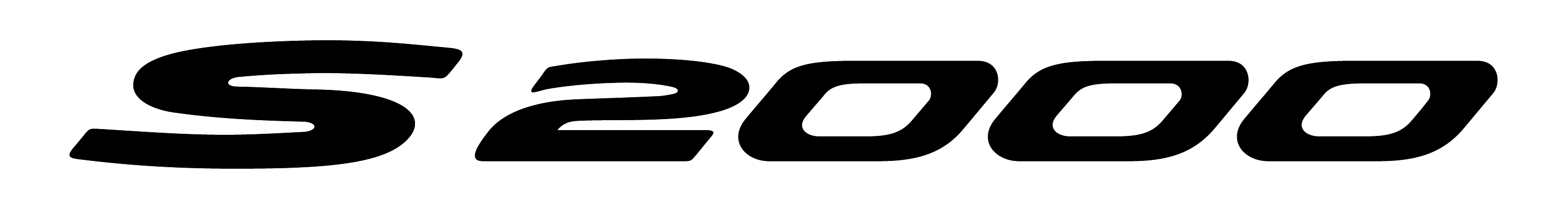
S2000 logo

Several revisions were made throughout the car's production life, including changes to the engine, gearbox, suspension, interior and exterior. Officially two variants exist: the initial launch model was given the chassis code AP1; though cosmetically similar, the facelifted version, known as the AP2 in North America and Japan, incorporated significant changes to the drivetrain and suspension. Production of the S2000 ceased on August 19, 2009.

The Honda S2000 was notable for its exceptional specific power output of about 92 kW (124 hp) per liter, or about two horsepower per cubic inch, the highest of any mass production, naturally aspirated car, until 2010.

== Concept car ==
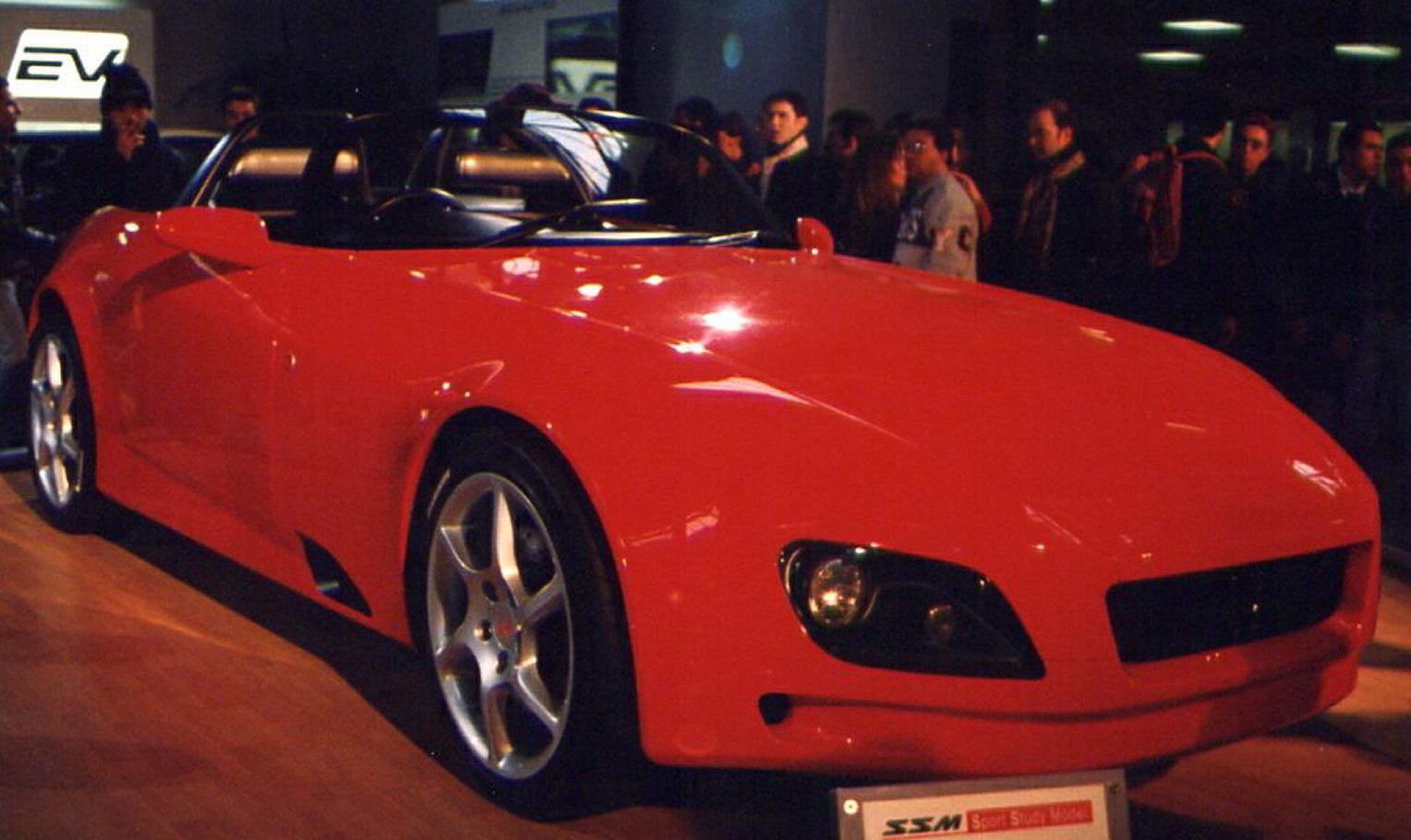
Honda SSM Concept

Introduced at the 1995 Tokyo Motor Show, the Honda Sport Study Model concept car was the design study for the production version of the S2000. The inspirations for the concept car were the first prototype Honda Formula One racing car, the Honda RA270 from 1963 and the Caterham Seven. The SSM was a front-mid engine rear-wheel-drive roadster powered by a 2.0 L (122 cu in) five-cylinder engine. It featured a rigid 'high X-bone frame' which Honda claimed improved the vehicle's rigidity and collision safety. The concept car was constructed with aluminum body panels and featured a 50:50 weight distribution. The SSM was designed by Honda's own staff, should not be confused with the Argento Vivo roadster concept designed by Pininfarina, introduced same year and powered by a Honda in-line four cylinder engine as well.

The SSM appeared in many automotive shows for several years afterwards, hinting at the possibility of a production version, which Honda announced in 1999.

== Development ==
The whole development process was carried out by Honda designers and engineers. The development team was sticking curiously to the classic Honda values, instead of marketing requirements, as former Chief Engineer Shigeru Uehara revealed in an interview:

The X-bone frame (yellow) used in the construction of the S2000 chassis

"You will be surprised to know that we had very little input from the marketing people. This was a deliberate move, as we wanted to create something to please us as an engineering team, rather than try and please everyone. If you listen to everyone, included everything they ask for, all cars end up the same. We wanted a vehicle that was more focused - more Honda."

The development team focused on keeping the compact size and low weight of the concept car according to Uehara:

"The reaction garnered by the SSM meant we had to keep the S2000 as close as possible to the concept car. Using a Civic CRX Del Sol-based mule, it was obvious the packaging was going to be tight, but the early prototype was tried against rival models at Suzuka, and it looked so right, we felt obliged to continue down the same development path."

The car was tested primarily on race tracks and mountain roads of Japan and Europe, reflecting well the purpose of the roadster:

"As the project evolved, to make sure we were on the right track, we did a lot of real world testing - first in Hokkaido, and then all over Europe, taking in an average of 450 miles (720 km) a day at high speed. We wanted a car that delivered just the right amount of tension for the driver, with direct and linear response, sharp handling and the necessary power and torque for fast progress and safe overtaking, but nothing too excessive. The final fine-tuning was done on the track to ensure the handling was right without being that sharp that the car became unruly, whatever the weather, followed by more road testing, including a fair bit around the Hakone area. Ultimately, overall driving feel and sound were considered more important than outright speed."

== AP1 (1999–2003) ==
Honda S2000 (AP1)
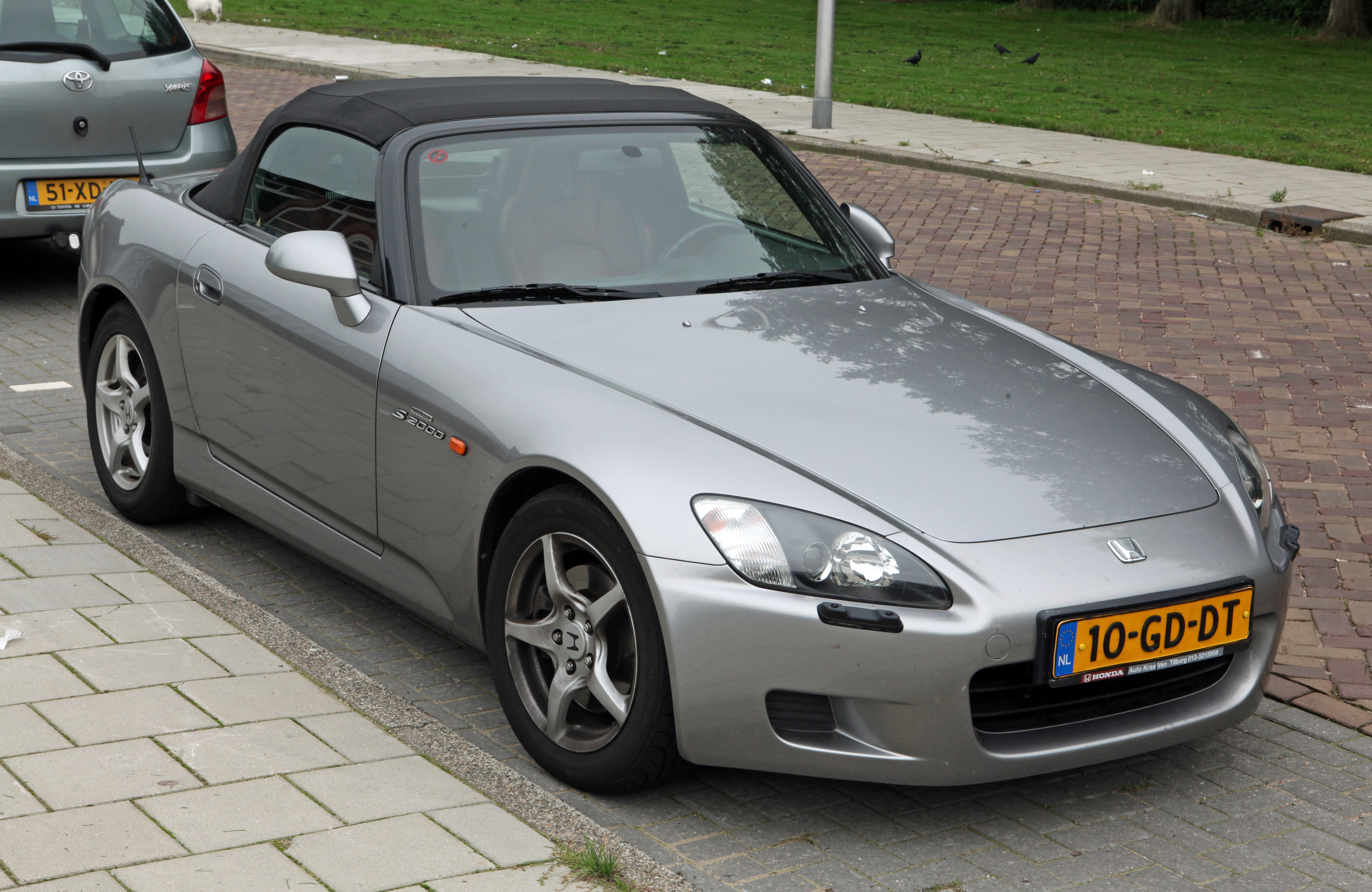

Overview
- Production: 1999–2003
- Assembly: Takanezawa R&D Plant, Takanezawa, Tochigi, Japan

Powertrain
- Engine: 2.0 L F20C I4
- Transmission: 6-speed manual

Dimensions
- Wheelbase: 2,400 mm (94.5 in)
- Length: 4,120 mm (162.2 in)
- Width: 1,750 mm (68.9 in)
- Height: 1,285 mm (50.6 in)
- Curb weight: 1,274 kg (2,809 lb)

The S2000 was introduced in 1999 for the 2000 model year and was given the chassis designation of "AP1". It features a front-mid engine rear-wheel-drive layout with power delivered by a 1,997 cc (122 cu in) inline four-cylinder DOHC VTEC engine. The engine (codenamed F20C) generates power outputs of 177–184 kW (241–250 PS; 237–247 hp), and 208–218 N⋅m (153–161 lbf⋅ft) of torque depending on the target market. The engine is mated to a six-speed manual transmission and Torsen limited-slip differential. The S2000 achieved what Honda claimed as the highest specific output of a naturally aspirated production automobile engine in the world. The most powerful version; the JDM F20C was rated at 184 kW (250 PS; 247 hp) or 92 kW (125 PS; 123 hp) per liter as a result of a higher 11.7:1 compression ratio.

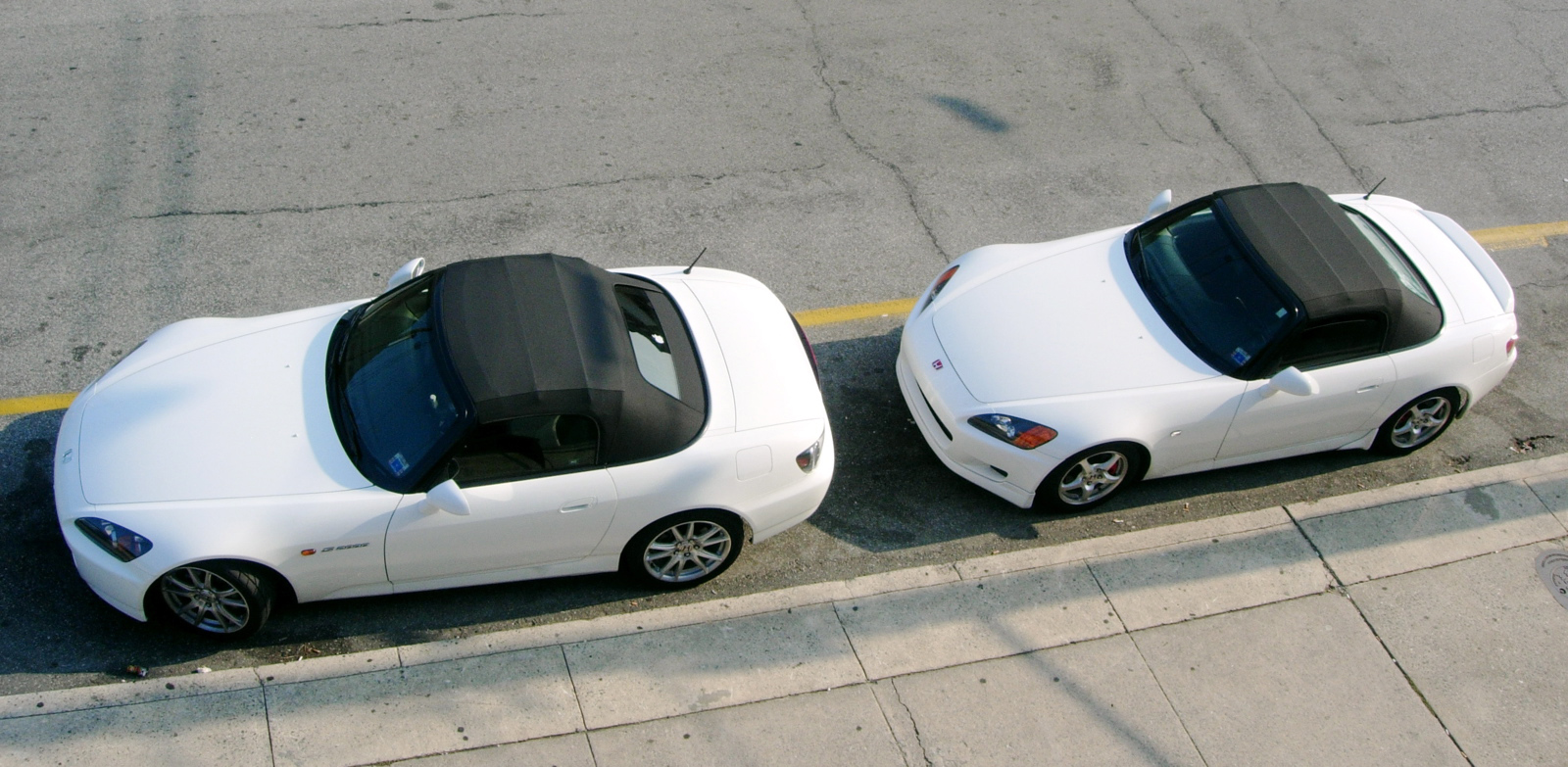
2004 AP2 and 2000 AP1 model S2000s from above—the AP1 has OEM front lip, side strakes, and rear spoiler.

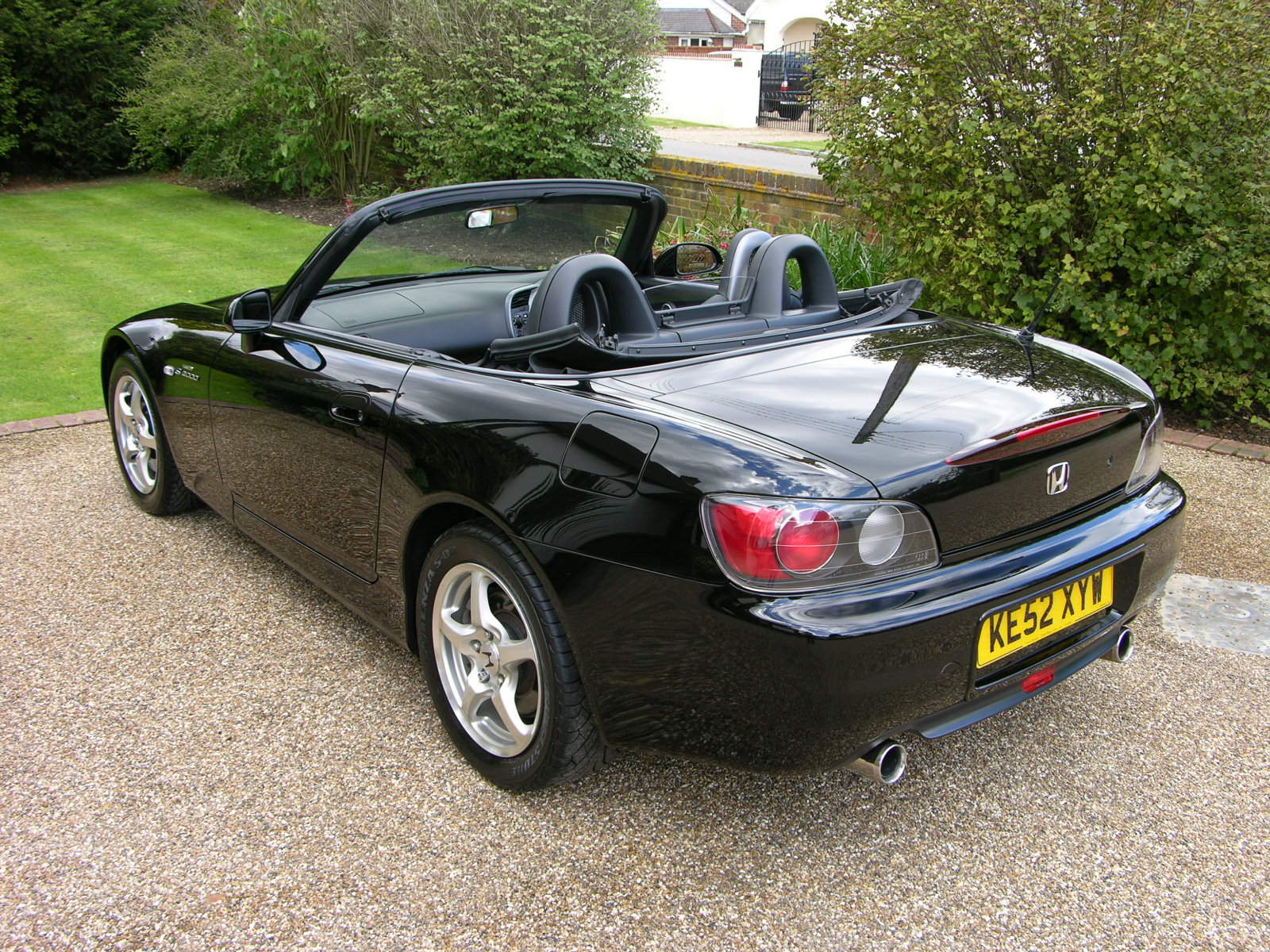
Honda S2000 (rear view)

Notable features include independent double wishbone suspension, electrically assisted steering and integrated roll hoops. The car had 16-inch wheels with Bridgestone Potenza S-02 tyres equipped. The compact and lightweight engine, mounted entirely behind the front axle, allow the S2000 to achieve a 50:50 front/rear weight distribution and lower rotational inertia. The dashboard got similar design to late eighties-early nineties McLaren-Honda Formula-1 racing cars (MP4/5, MP4/6 and MP4/7), as a reference to the racing pedigree of high rev line and output Honda engines. An electrically powered vinyl top with internal cloth lining and plastic rear window was standard, with an aluminum hardtop available as an optional extra (in 2001). Honda initially offered the S2000 in Berlina Black, New Formula Red, Grand Prix White, and Silverstone Metallic exterior colours in the US domestic market. On some other markets Monte Carlo Blue Pearl and Spa Yellow Pearl / Indy Yellow Pearl were also available from the beginning.

The 2001 model was largely unchanged; Honda added a digital clock to the radio display and made the rear wind blocker standard. Honda also added Spa Yellow exterior colour to the US domestic market lineup. For the 2002 model year, suspension settings were revised and the plastic rear window was replaced by a glass unit incorporating an electric defroster. Other updates included slightly revised tail lamps with chrome rings, an upgraded radio with separate tweeters, a leather-wrapped gearshift knob, leatherette console cover and a revised engine control unit. Honda added Suzuka Blue Metallic and Sebring Silver Metallic exterior colours to the US domestic market lineup.

The AP1 was manufactured until 2003 at Honda's Takanezawa plant, alongside the NSX and Insight hybrid.

=== Type V (Japan - 2000) ===
Honda announced the S2000 Type V on July 7, 2000, in the Japanese domestic market. Notable changes from the standard model include variable gear ratio steering (VGS), a steering system that continuously changes steering ratio based upon vehicle speed and steering angle to provide improved handling as well as more comfortable maneuvering in tight low-speed situations such as parking. It was the first system of its kind to be incorporated into a production car. The lock-to-lock steering ratio was reduced to 1.4 turns (versus 2.4 for the base model). Honda outfitted Type V cars with revised damper units, stabilizers and limited-slip differentials to "complement the VGS". Equipped cars came with a special steering wheel and a VGS badge on the rear. The Type V was retired upon the introduction of the Type S in 2007.

=== 20th Anniversary Prototype (Japan - 2019) ===
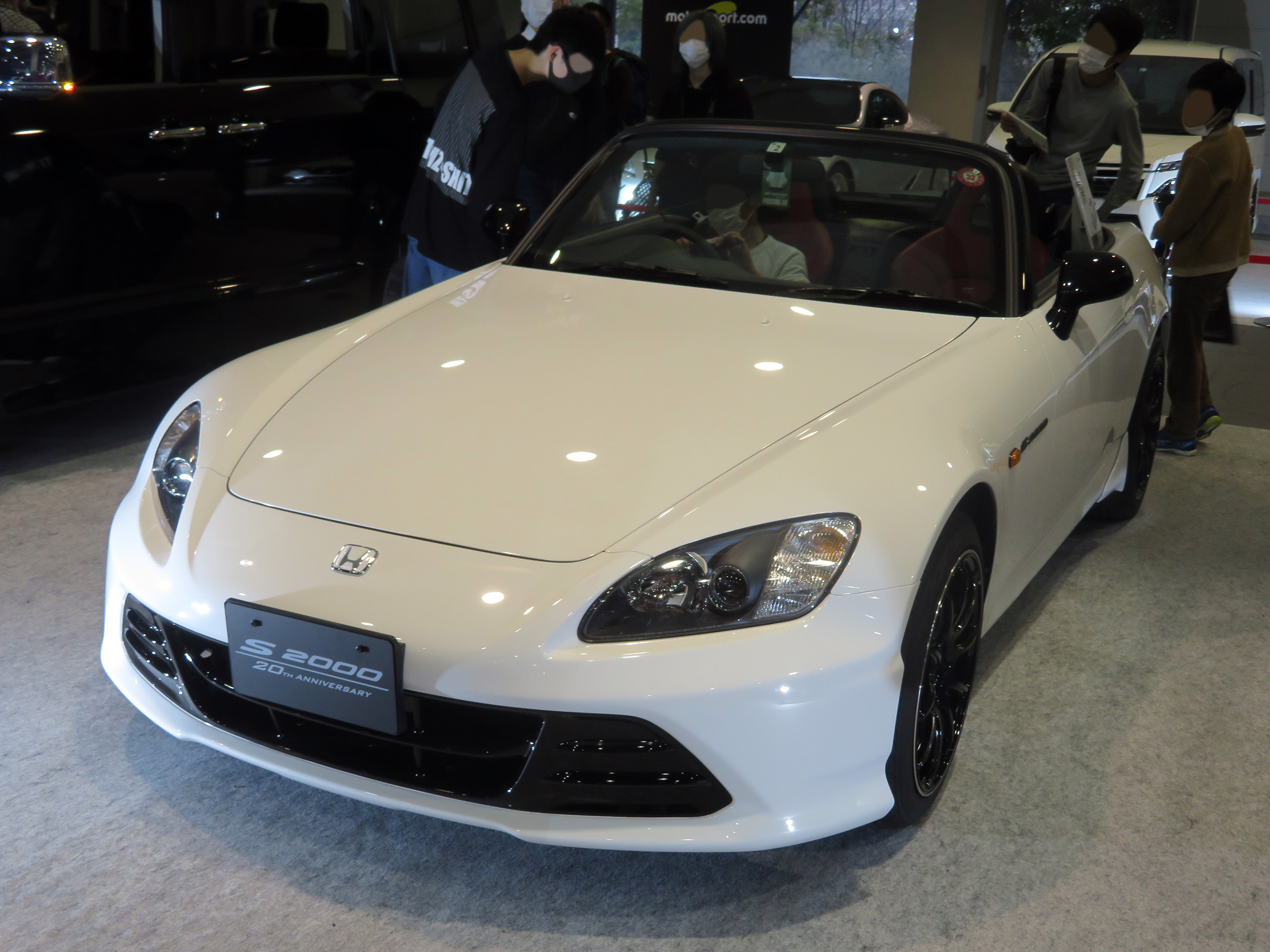
2019 Honda S2000 20th Anniversary Prototype

To mark the 20th anniversary of the S2000, Honda unveiled the S2000 20th Anniversary Prototype at the 2019 Tokyo Auto Salon. Essentially a restomod, the prototype was based on the AP1 and featured an updated exterior, suspension and audio system. Honda later made parts for the prototype available for purchase, including the Modulo X front bumper, sport suspension system and rear diffuser, alongside other S2000 parts as an effort to help owners keep their cars on the road.

== AP2 (2003–2009) ==
Honda S2000 (AP2)
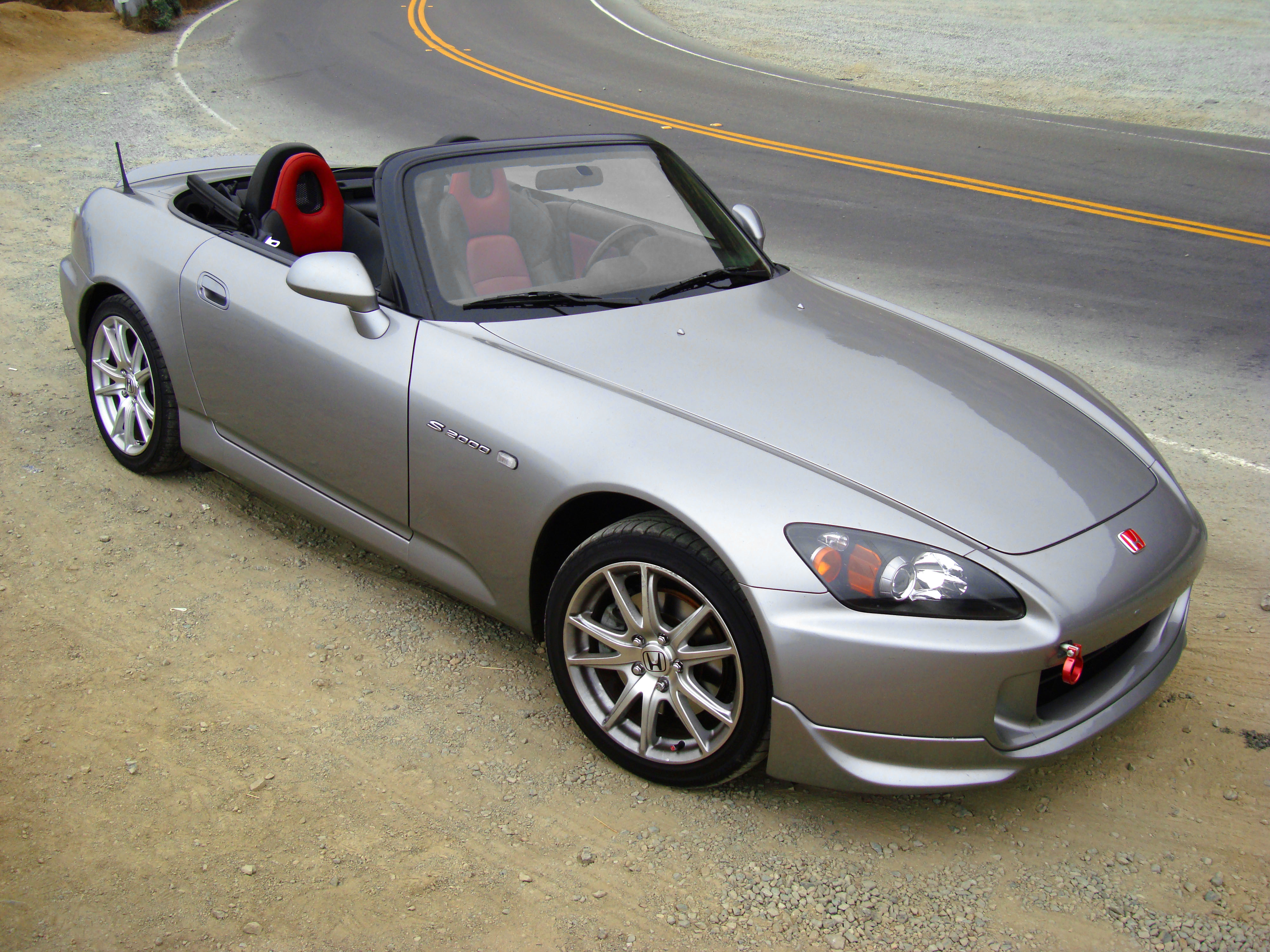

Overview
- Production: 2003–2009
- Assembly: Suzuka Plant, Suzuka, Mie, Japan, Takanezawa R&D Plant, Takanezawa, Tochigi, Japan (2004)

Powertrain
- Engine: 2.0 L F20C I4; 2.2 L F22C1 I4 (North America and Japan)
- Transmission: 6-speed manual

Dimensions
- Wheelbase: 2,400 mm (94.5 in)
- Length: 4,120 mm (162.2 in)
- Width: 1,750 mm (68.9 in)
- Height: 1,285 mm (50.6 in)
- Curb weight: 1,295–1,299 kg (2,855–2,864 lb)

The 2004 model S2000 underwent several significant changes. Production moved to Suzuka. The new model introduced 17 in (43 cm) wheels and Bridgestone RE-050 tyres along with a retuned suspension to reduce oversteer. The spring rates and shock absorber damping were altered and the suspension geometry was modified to improve stability by reducing toe-in changes under cornering loads. The subframe also received a revision in design to achieve high rigidity. In the gearbox the brass synchronizers were replaced with carbon fibre. In addition, cosmetic changes were made to the exterior with new front and rear bumpers, revised headlight assemblies, new LED tail-lights, and oval-tipped exhaust pipes. Although all the cosmetic, suspension and most drivetrain upgrades were included on the Japanese, Australian and European models, they retained the 2.0-liter F20C engines and remained designated as AP1 (facelift) models.

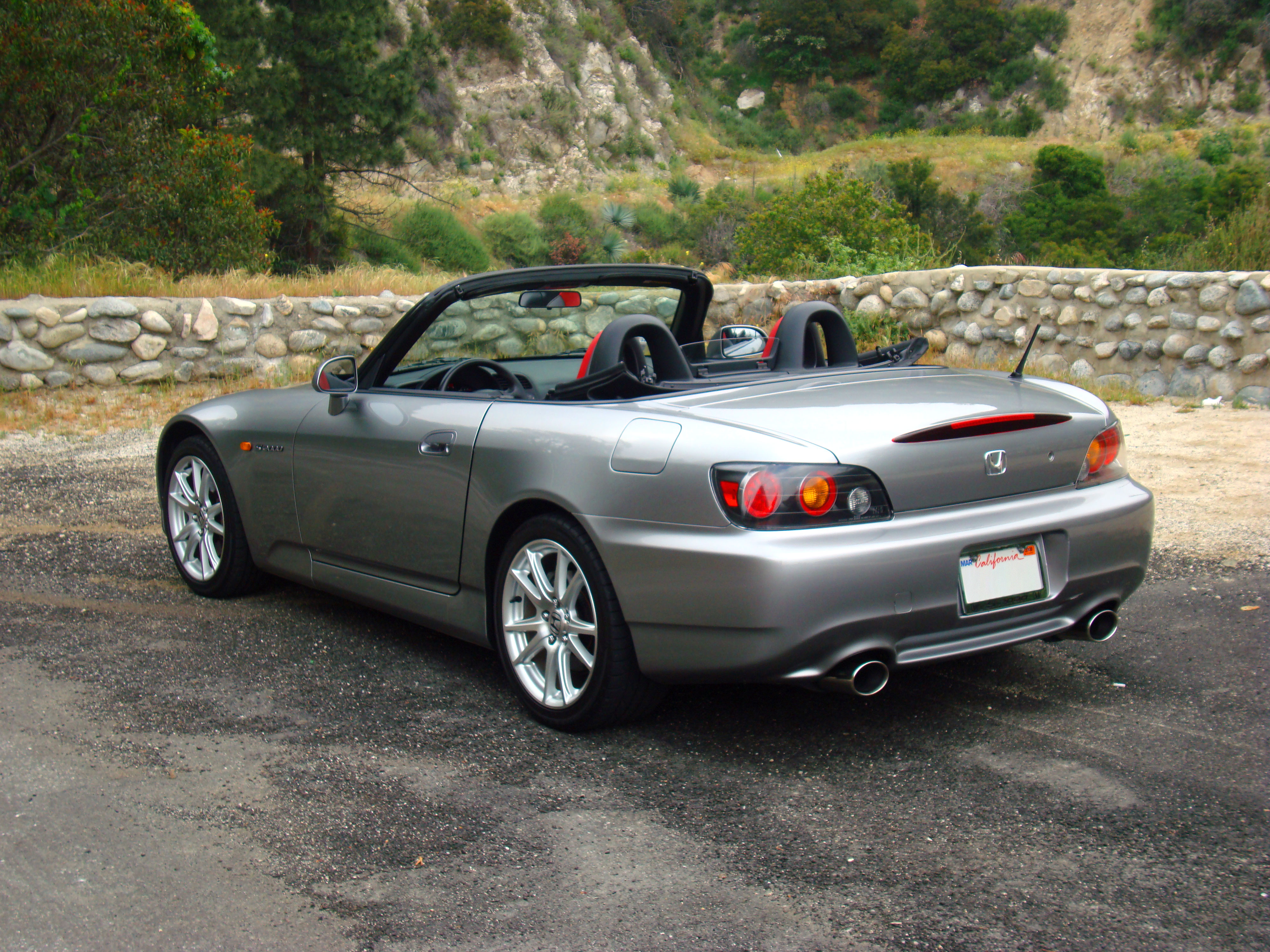
2005 Honda S2000 (rear view)

For the North American market, the updates also included the introduction of a larger version of the F20C (with a designation of F22C1); this larger engine gave the new model a chassis designation of AP2. The engine's stroke was lengthened, increasing its displacement to 2,157 cc (2.2 L; 131.6 cu in). At the same time, the redline and fuel cutoff were reduced from 8,800 rpm and 9,000 rpm to 8,000 rpm and 8,200 rpm respectively, mandated by the longer travel of the pistons. Peak torque increased by 6% to 220 N⋅m (162 lbf⋅ft) at 6,800 rpm while power output remained unchanged at 177 kW (237 hp) achieved at a lower 7,800 rpm. In conjunction with the introduction of the F22C1, Honda also changed the transmission gear ratios by shortening the first five gears and lengthening the sixth.

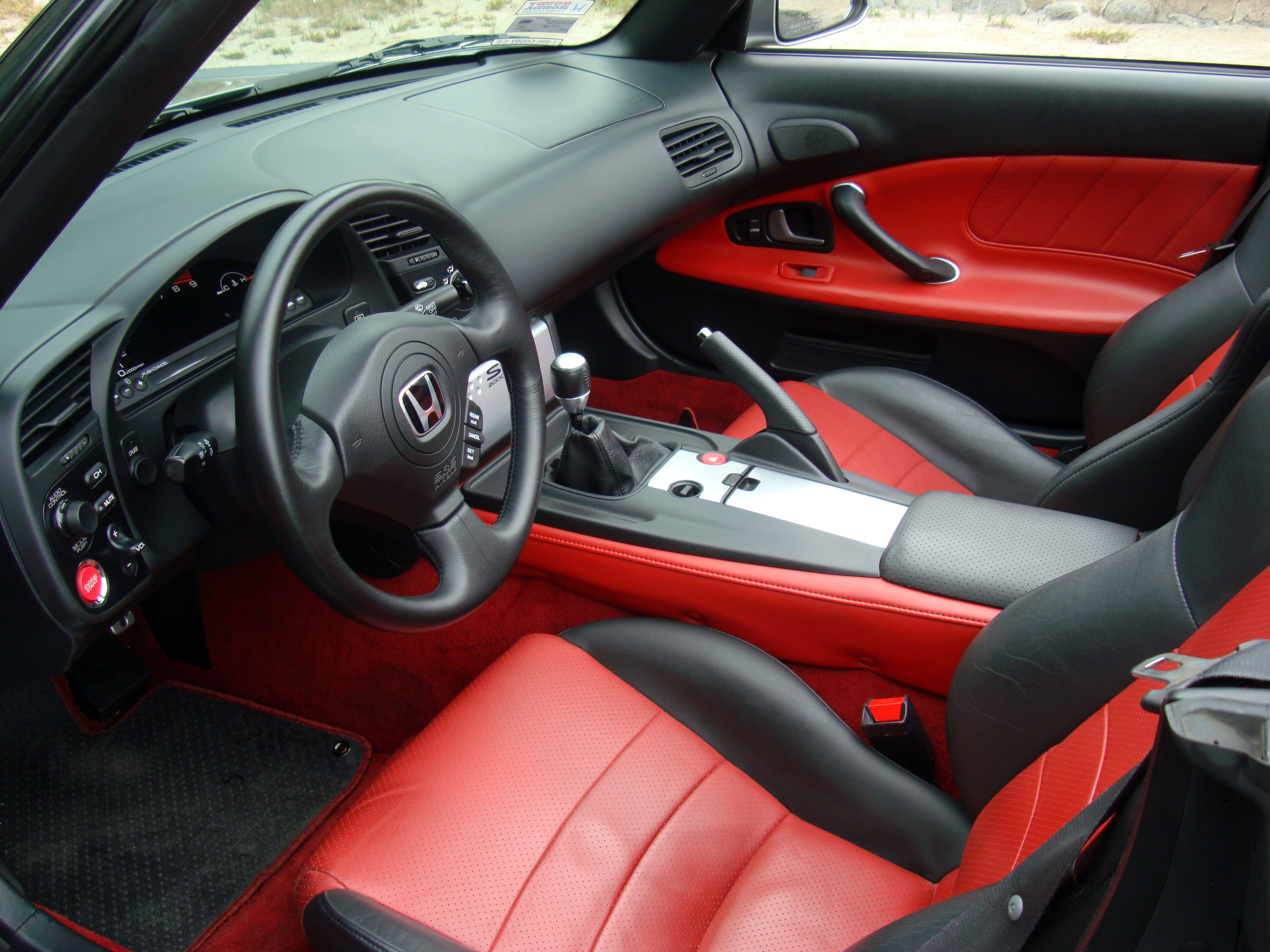
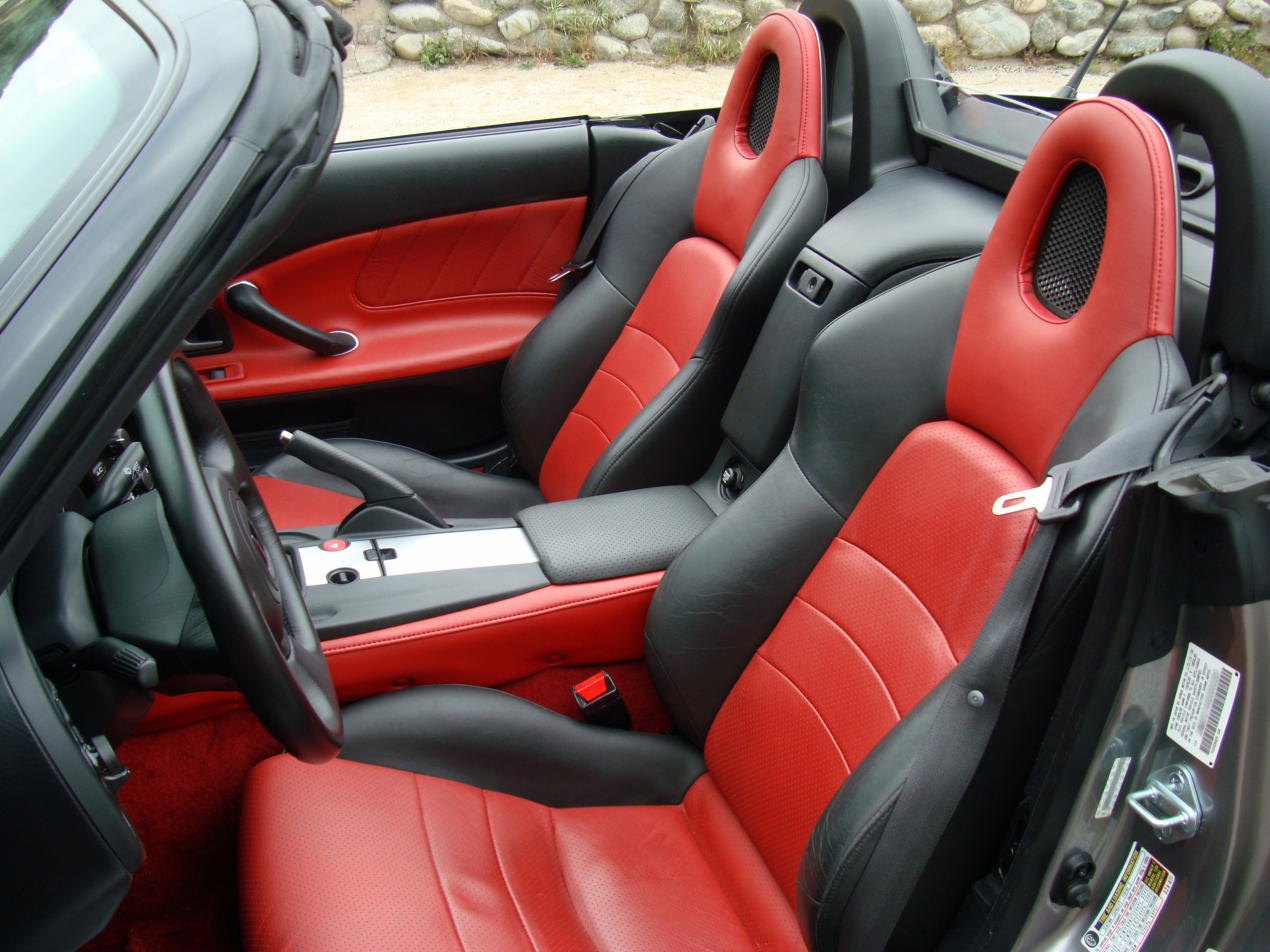
2005 Honda S2000 AP2 red/black interior

In 2006, the F22C1 was also introduced to the Japanese market, with a power output of 178 kW (242 PS; 239 hp) and 221 N⋅m (163 lbf⋅ft). The F20C continued in all other markets. The 2006 model introduced a drive by wire throttle, an electronic stability control system, new wheels, and one new exterior color, Laguna Blue Pearl. Interior changes included revised seats and additional stereo speakers integrated into the headrests.

=== Club Racer (U.S. - 2008) ===
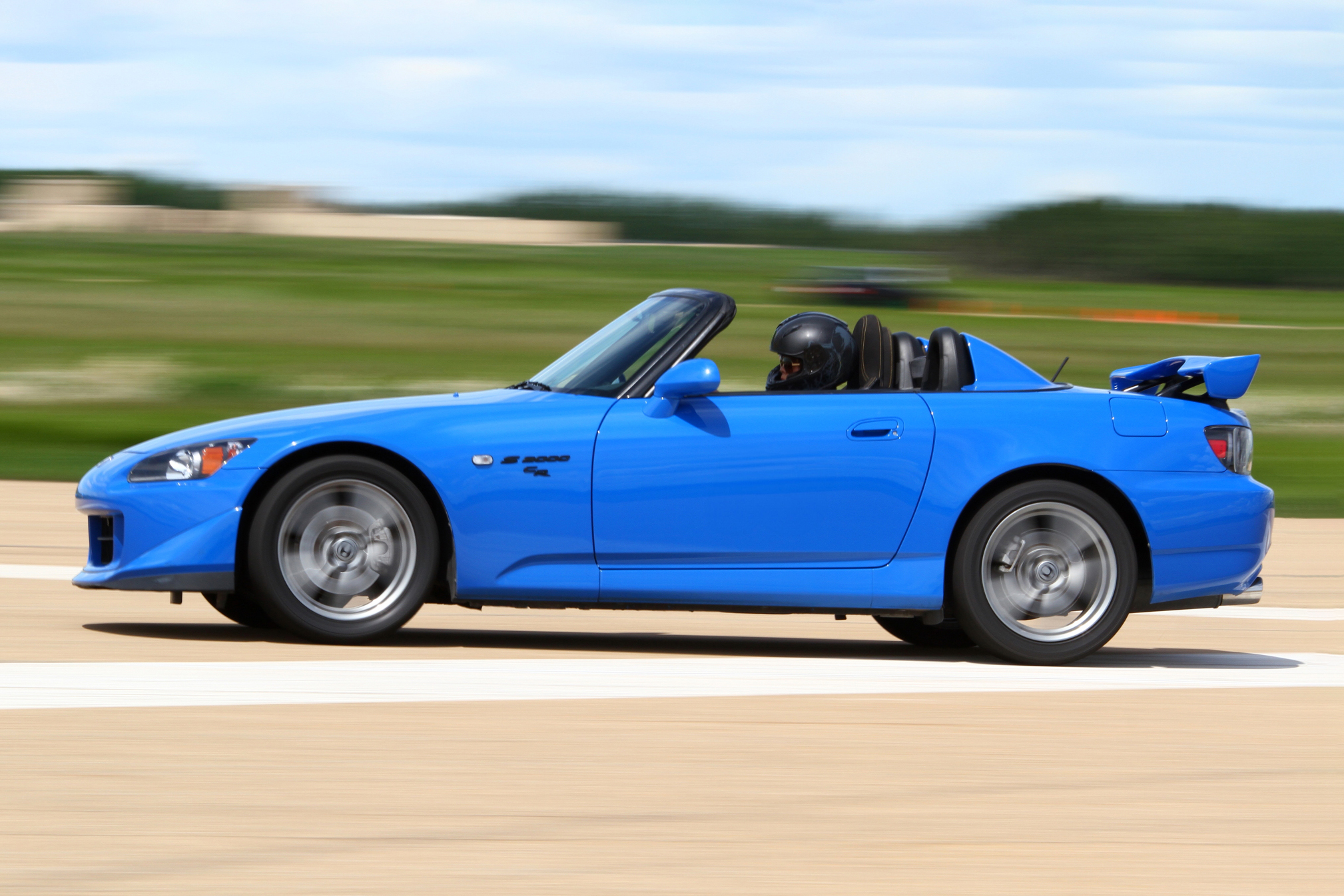
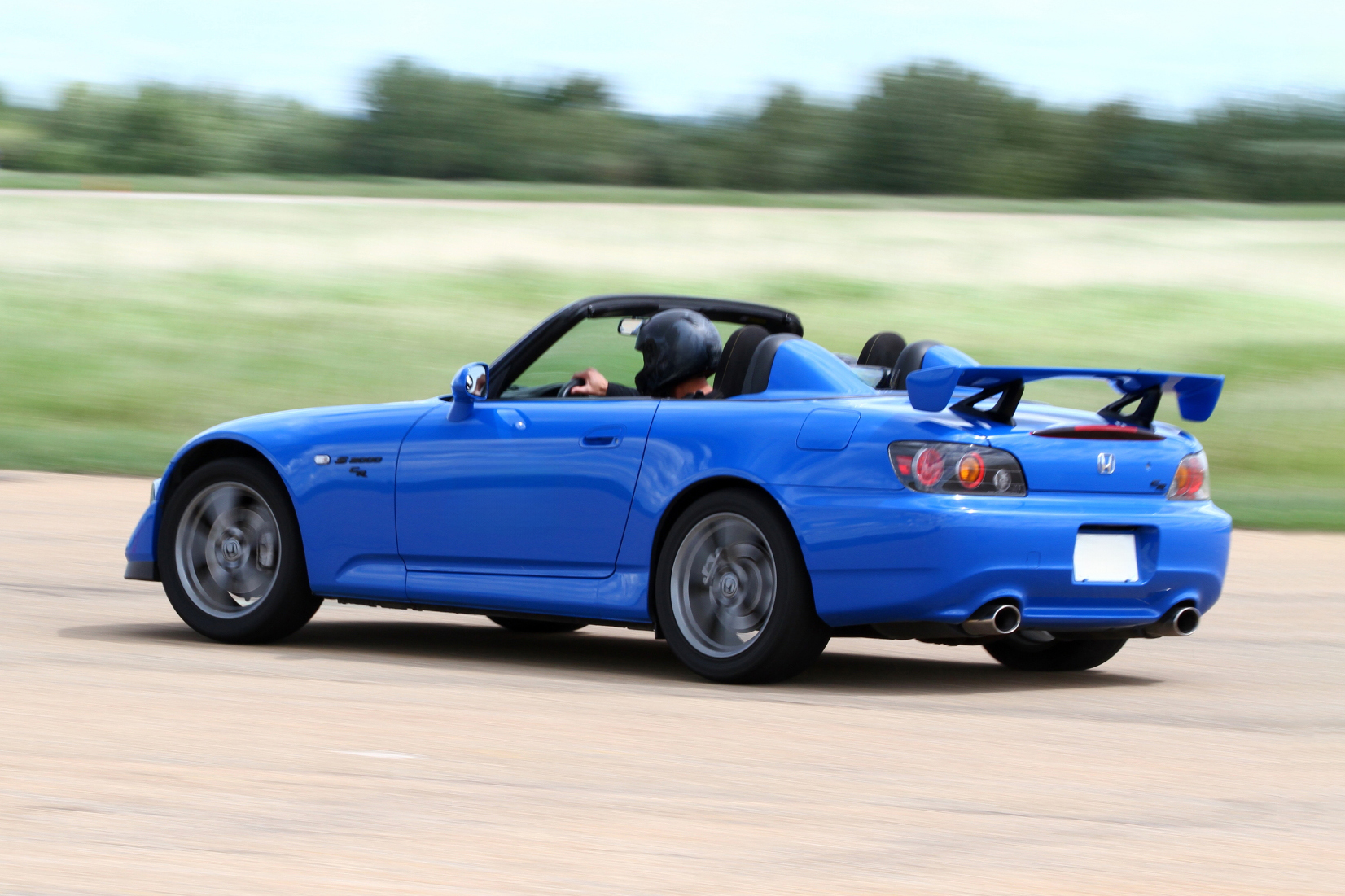
Honda S2000 Club Racer

The 2008 model year marked the first time the S2000 was offered in more than one trim level in the United States. In addition to the base model, Honda offered a more track-oriented version of the S2000, distinguished by reduced weight, fewer amenities, and an increase in performance. The S2000 Club Racer made its world debut at the New York International Auto Show on 4 April 2007. Changes for the CR included a lower ratio steering rack, revised exhaust system, black lug nuts, darker colored wheels, clear side markers, stiffer suspension and new Bridgestone Potenza RE070 tyres that were 10mm wider at the rear (255/40R-17 vice the base model's 245/40R-17). A revised body kit, composed of a redesigned front lip, and a large spoiler, were wind-tunnel tested and claimed to reduce the overall coefficient of lift by 70–80%. The power folding soft top was removed and replaced with a Berlina Black hard top (regardless of the car's body paint colour), while the space into which the soft top would normally fold when lowered was filled with additional chassis bracing and topped off with a body-color tonneau cover. Honda also used a CR-unique yellow-lettered spherical aluminum shift knob which rests 12.6 mm lower than the base model's cylindrical shift knob (aluminum/leather wrapped). The CR knob provided a 6 percent reduction in shift stroke, and correspondingly presented a 10 percent higher shift load effort.

CR models were only available with yellow and black Alcantara interiors. Faux carbon fiber overlays on the center console and radio door were unique to the CR trim, as was a peak power indicator light on the instrument gauge cluster, which flashes when the engine is producing its peak power output. To reduce weight and lower the center of gravity, the spare tire was omitted and air conditioning and stereo were offered only as options. Net weight savings without the additional hardtop came to 41 kg (90 lb) relative to the standard model. The engine in the S2000 CR was unchanged from the standard trim. Shigeru Uehara, the designer of the S2000, stated that the CR was positioned between the Type S and a hypothetical Type R. However, Honda never made an official Type R S2000 variant.

Production volume of fewer than 2,000 units was expected at launch, and 668 were made for the 2008 model year, representing just over a quarter of the total U.S. production. Honda continued to offer both the standard and CR versions unchanged for the 2009 model year, but with flagging sales caused by the 2008 automotive industry crisis, the S2000 was cancelled mid-model-year. Just 355 U.S. S2000s were manufactured for 2009, of which 31 were CR models. Thus, total CR production over the two model years was 699 units.

=== Type S (Japan - 2008) ===
The Japanese domestic market received the Type S edition for the last two years of production (2008–2009). Changes are similar to the U.S. market's CR edition, sharing the weight loss, a purpose built bodykit providing much higher downforce, bespoke wheels and interior. Although it shares the wheels with the CR edition, the Type S retains the rear tyre size of 245/40R-17 for better handling. A specific Type S suspension setup with improved geometry was designed to enhance the handling, the setup is stiffer but more compromising than the CR setup to suit it better to everyday spirited driving and the Japanese touge experience. The Type S retains its soft top folding mechanism.

The interior is a Type S specific yellow and black Alcantara material scheme (similar to the CR). Leather interior from the standard S2000 was available as a no cost option. The aluminum shift knob with reduced shift stroke is shared with the CR. While the CR is designed to be a pure track car, the Type S is designed for improved handling and retains some creature comforts. Only 1,755 units of the Type S were made and sold exclusively in Japan. (2007:168 units, 2008:827 units, 2009:737 units, 2010 [Jan-Jun]:23 units)

=== GT (U.K. - 2002) ===
In the United Kingdom, from 2002, the S2000 was offered in both roadster and GT trim. The GT featured a removable hard-top and an outside temperature gauge. On-the-road prices of these trims were £27,300 and £27,850 respectively.

=== Ultimate Edition and GT Edition 100 (Europe - 2009) ===
The S2000 Ultimate Edition (continental Europe) and GT Edition 100 (UK market) were limited versions of the S2000 released to commemorate the end of production. Notable changes on both of the cars included Grand Prix White body colour, a removable hard top, graphite-colored alloy wheels with black wheel bolts, aluminium ball gear lever, black S2000 badging and red leather interior with red coloring for stitching on the gear lever gaiter.

The Ultimate Edition was unveiled at the 2009 Geneva Motor Show and went on sale in March 2009. The GT Edition 100 was a limited run of 100 units made specifically for the UK market. In addition to the Ultimate Edition's specification, it features a numbered plaque on the kick-plate indicating which vehicle in the series it is (numbers ranging from 1 to 101. Number 49 was omitted).

== Specifications ==
	1999–2003 AP1 (F20C)	2004–2009 AP2 (F20C) (JP)	2004–2009 AP2 (F22C1)	2008–2009 AP2 CR (F22C1)
Drivetrain
Engine type	Naturally aspirated inline-4			
Displacement	1,997 cc (2 L; 122 cu in)		2,157 cc (2.2 L; 131.6 cu in)	
Power	177 kW (241 PS; 237 hp) at 8,300 rpm (US & EU); 184 kW (250 PS; 247 hp) at 8,300 rpm (JP)		177 kW (241 PS; 237 hp) at 7,800 rpm (US); 178 kW (242 PS; 239 hp) at 7,800 rpm (JP)	
Torque	208 N⋅m (153 lbf⋅ft) at 7,500 rpm (US & EU); 218 N⋅m (161 lbf⋅ft) at 7,500 rpm (JP)		220 N⋅m (162 lbf⋅ft) at 6,800 rpm (US); 221 N⋅m (163 lbf⋅ft) at 6,500–7,500 rpm (JP)	
Redline / fuel cut-out	8,800 rpm / 9,000 rpm		8,000 rpm / 8,200 rpm	
Bore & stroke	87.0 mm (3.425 in) x 84.0 mm (3.307 in)		87.0 mm (3.425 in) x 90.7 mm (3.571 in)	
Compression ratio	11.0:1 (US & EU); 11.7:1 (JP)		11.1:1	
Valvetrain	16-valve DOHC VTEC			
Transmission	6-speed manual			
Gear ratios	1st: 3.133; 2nd: 2.045; 3rd: 1.481; 4th: 1.161; 5th: 0.979; 6th: 0.810; Secondary gear reduction: 1.160; Final drive: 4.100; Reverse: 2.800		1st: 3.133; 2nd: 2.045; 3rd: 1.481; 4th: 1.161; 5th: 0.943; 6th: 0.763; Secondary gear reduction: 1.208; Final drive: 4.100; Reverse: 2.800	
Dimensions
Weight (GVWR)	1,535 kg (3,384 lb) (US) (CA) 1,260 kg (2,778 lb) (JP type V)		1,550 kg (3,417 lb)	1,254 kg (2,765 lb) (without Air Conditioning) 1,295 kg (2,855 lb) (with Air Conditioning)
Height	1,270 mm (50.0 in)			
Width	1,750 mm (68.9 in)			
Length	4,112 mm (161.9 in)			4,135 mm (163 in)
Wheelbase	2,400 mm (94.5 in)			
Ground Clearance	130 mm (5.1 in)			
Tires	Bridgestone Potenza S-02; F: 205/55R16 89W; R: 225/50R16 92W	Bridgestone Potenza RE050; F: 215/45R17 97W; R: 245/40R17 91W		Bridgestone Potenza RE070; F: 215/45ZR17 97W; R: 255/40ZR17 94W
Wheels	F: 16x6.5" +55mm R: 16x7.5" +65mm	F: 17x7" +55mm R: 17x8.5" +65mm		
Brakes	F: 300 mm (11.8 in) ventilated discs R: 282 mm (11.1 in) solid disc			

Notes:

- US: United States
- CA: Canada
- EU: Europe
- JP: Japan
- F: front
- R: rear

Exterior Colors (paint code)	Model			
Exterior Colors (paint code)	S2000 (USDM)	CR (USDM)	S2000 (JDM)	S2000 (Europe)
Grand Prix White (NH565)	✔	✔	✔	✔
Berlina Black (NH547)	✔	✔	✔	✔
Spa Yellow Pearl / Indy Yellow Pearl (Y52P)	✔	✘	✔	✔
New Formula Red (R510)	✔	✘	✔	✔
Sebring Silver Metallic (NH552M)	✔	✘	✔	✘
Rio Yellow Pearl / New Indy Yellow Pearl (Y65P)	✔	✔	✔	✔
Laguna Blue Pearl / Bermuda Blue Pearl (B545P)	✔	✘	✔	✔
Apex Blue Pearl (B554P)	✘	✔	✔	✔
Chicane Silver Metallic / Syncro Silver Metallic (NH745M)	✔	✘	✔	✔
Silverstone Metallic (NH630M)	✔	✘	✔	✔
Suzuka Blue Metallic / Nurburgring Blue Metallic (B513M)	✔	✘	✔	✔
Platinum White Pearl (NH-609P)	✘	✘	✔	✔
Monza Red Pearl (R-508P)	✘	✘	✔	✔
Lime Green Metallic (GY-19M)	✘	✘	✔	✔
Moonrock Metallic (NH-676M)	✘	✘	✔	✔
New Imola Orange Pearl (YR-536P)	✘	✘	✔	✔
Montecarlo Blue Pearl (B66P)	✘	✘	✔	✔
Premium Sunset Mauve Pearl (RP-42P)	✘	✘	✔	✔
Deep Burgundy Metallic (YR564M)	✘	✘	✔	✔
Midnight Pearl (PB-73P)	✘	✘	✔	✘
Dark Cardinal Red Pearl (R-523P)	✘	✘	✔	✘

== Safety ==
In 2002, the Honda S2000 received a 4-star Euro NCAP rating.

NHTSA crash test ratings (2006):

- Frontal Crash Test – Driver:
- Frontal Crash Test – Passenger:
- Side Impact Rating – Driver:
- Rollover Rating: 8.2%

ANCAP test results* Honda S2000 roadster (2009)
Test	Score
Overall	4 /5 stars
Frontal offset	11.63/16
Side impact	15.25/16
Pole	Not Assessed
Seat belt reminders	0/3
Whiplash protection	Not Assessed
Pedestrian protection	Not Assessed
Electronic stability control	Not Assessed

== Reviews and awards ==
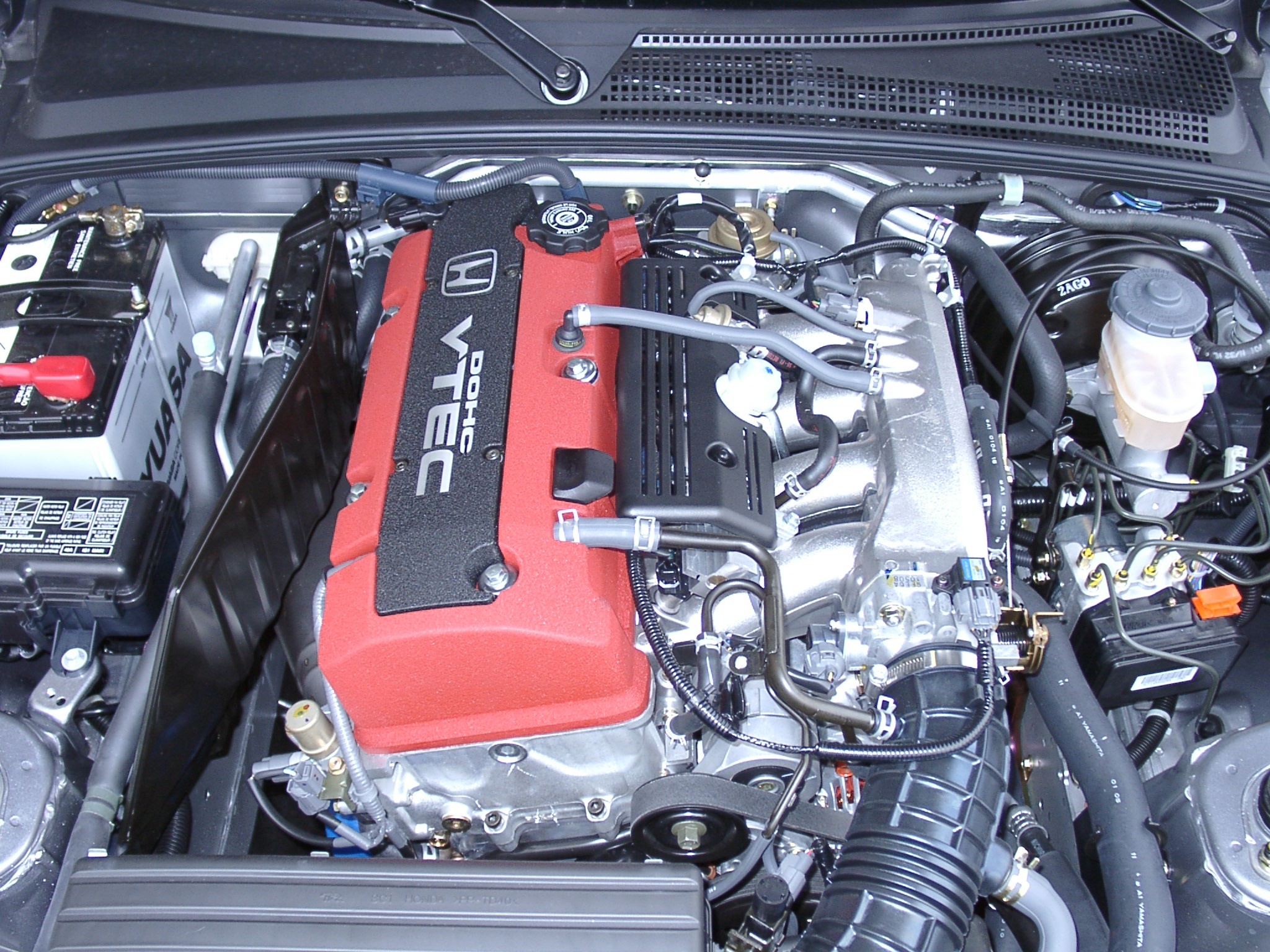
F20C engine of the Honda S2000 in left hand drive specification (battery on the right side of the engine)

The S2000 has received much praise from critics and motoring journalists and has received favourable reviews from such publications as Car and Driver. Highlighted are the high output of the engine, the high redline, the balanced handling, and the smooth gearbox. User surveys have named the S2000 as a favorite for overall customer satisfaction.

- The S2000 was the Cabrio of the Year at 1999 Geneva International Motor Show where Honda held the roadster's world premiere.
- The S2000 was awarded the "Best of What's New" title by Popular Science.
- The design of the S2000 won the Red Dot Design Award in 2001 in the "Best of the Best" Category.
- The S2000 was named the "Best Performance Car" by Motorweek, when it was new.
- The S2000 was on Car and Driver's 10Best list for 2000, 2001, 2002 and 2004.
- The S2000 was the highest-ranked model in the J. D. Power and Associates Vehicle Dependability Study "Premium Sports Car" class for 2004, 2006, and 2008 and consistently held one of the top three positions.
- The S2000 won Car and Driver's 2003 open-top sports car comparison test against the Nissan 350Z, Porsche Boxster, BMW Z4, and Audi TT.
- The S2000 was ranked number #1 in the BBC Top Gear survey in 2003, 2005, and 2006.
- The S2000 was voted as favourite car of Top Gear Magazine readers in 2005, 2006 and 2007.
- The S2000 was ranked as "Best Affordable Sports Car" by U.S. News & World Report in 2008 and 2009
- The S2000 was on Edmunds Consumers' Most Wanted Vehicles list for 2004, 2005 and 2007.
- The S2000 was the most reliable car in consumer report of AutoExpress UK in 2005 and 2006.
- The S2000 was voted in AutoExpress UK's Driver Power survey as the Best Performance Car 2003 and 2004, Best Gearbox 2003, Best Braking 2004 and Used Car Honours 2003 for Best Roadster. The S2000 was also the Auto Express Driver Power 2005 and 2006 overall winner across all categories.
- The S2000 was one of Jalopnik's Best 10 Cars Of The Decade.
- The S2000 was one of Road & Track's Best All-Around Sports Cars.
- The F20C engine of the S2000 was ranked as the best engine respective its size category in the competition "International Engine of the Year" for five consecutive years between 2000 and 2004.
- The F20C engine of the S2000 was one of Ward's 10 Best Engines in 2000 and 2001.
- In 2017, Ferrari's chief engineer Francesco Morettini rated the S2000's engine as the non-Ferrari engine he admired the most.
- In 2023, the S2000 was voted as the third-best sports car of the previous 25 years by the PistonHeads community.

== Motorsport ==
The Honda S2000 has been used in various forms of motorsport. In the Super Taikyu Series, the car has won numerous championships in the ST-4 class and scored class victories at the Tokachi 24 Hours race. It has also won its class at the Nürburgring 24 Hours, and won at the SCCA National Championship Runoffs. The S2000 is popular in autocross and track day events.

In time attack competition, an S2000 modified by Top Fuel set the lap record for rear-wheel drive cars at the Tsukuba Circuit in 2008, which it held for three years. With further modifications, the car produced tuning car lap records at Fuji Speedway, Suzuka Circuit, Okayama International Circuit and Autopolis in 2014 and 2015, while its laptime of 51.762 seconds at Tsukuba set in 2016 ranks among the fastest ever recorded for time attack cars.

In drifting, the S2000 scored several podiums in Formula D during the mid-2000s, including a win at an invitational event at Irwindale, which featured the top 16 drivers from the series' 2004 season. Tetsuya Hibino competed with a 2JZ-powered S2000 in the D1 Grand Prix series between 2017 and 2018, taking a solo run win at the 2017 Tsukuba round.

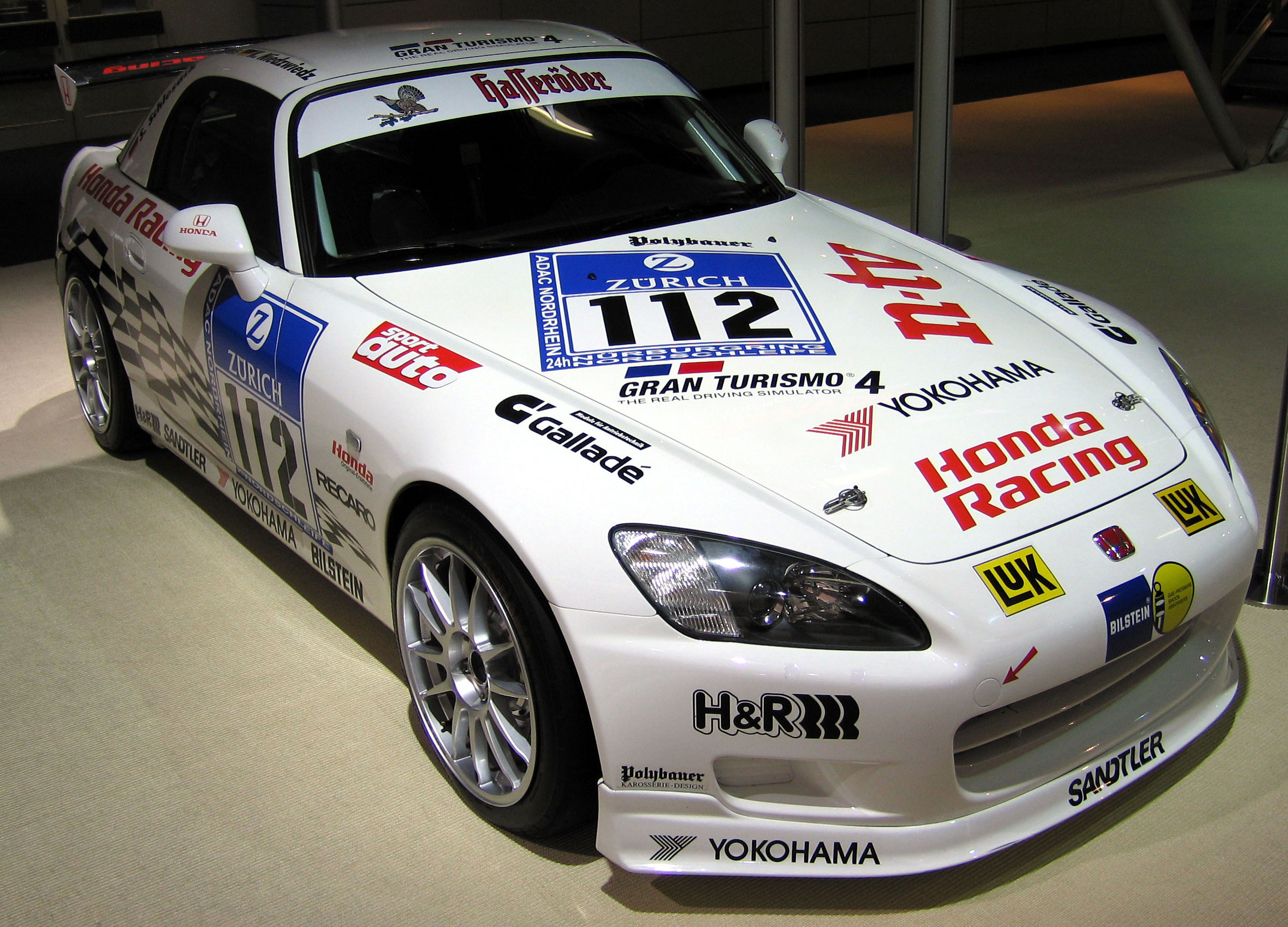
The 2003 Nürburgring 24 Hours class-winning Honda S2000 race car

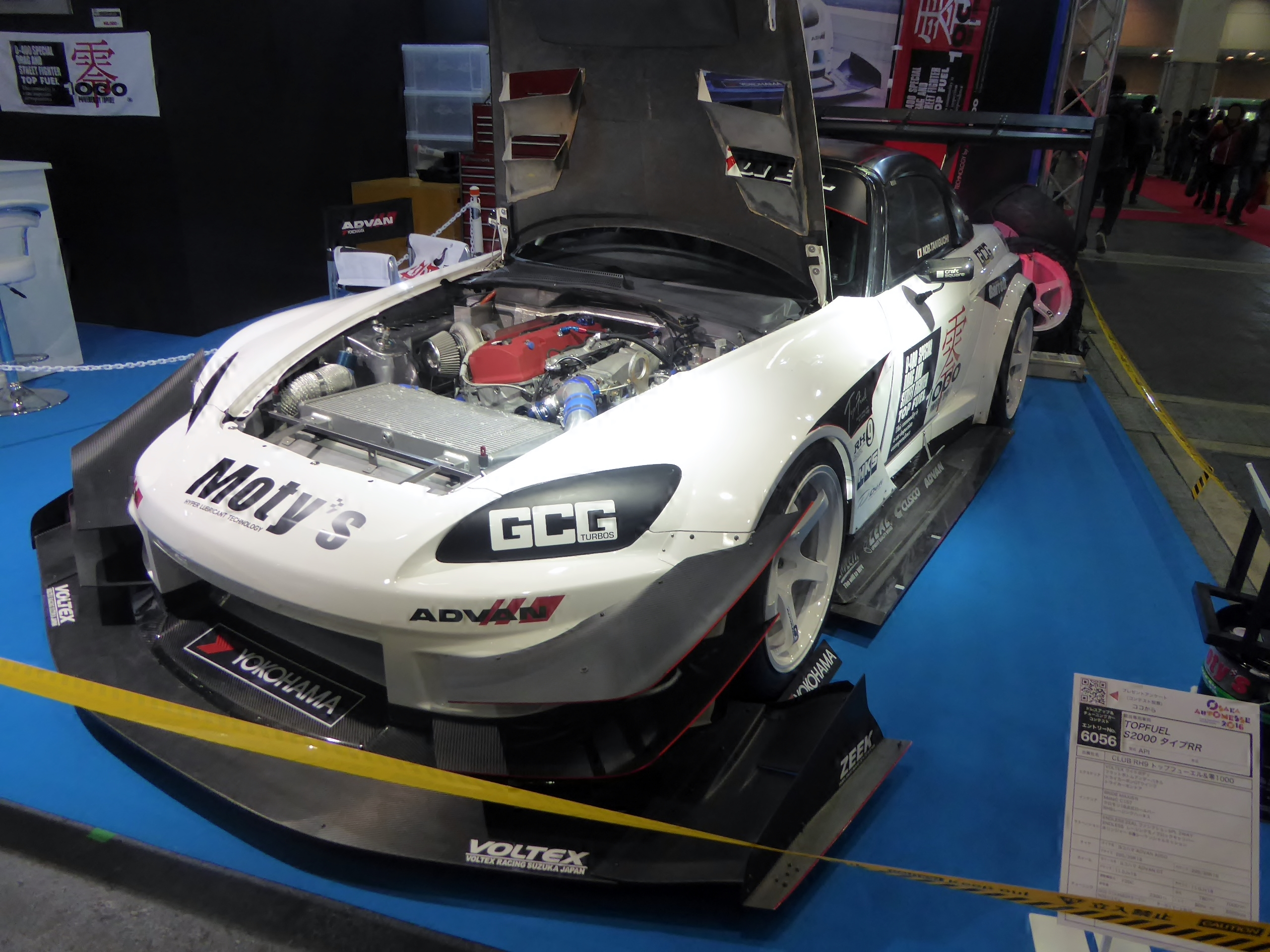
Top Fuel Honda S2000 Type RR used at Tsukuba Time Attack in 2016

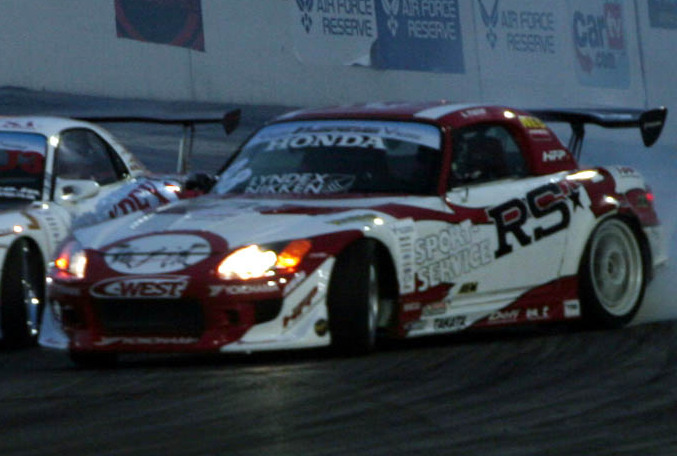
The RS-R Honda S2000 drift car

== Sales and production ==
After several years of steady production, sales of the roadster began falling dramatically starting in 2006, and the trend accelerated during the 2008 automotive industry crisis. In 2008, only 2,538 units were sold in the U.S. - a 74% decline from the 2002 sales peak. In November of that year, for the first time since its launch, only 90 new S2000s were sold nationwide during a calendar month.

Production of the S2000 ceased in June 2009 and plans for a successor were scrapped in the aftermath of the automotive industry crisis; Honda reaffirmed their stance on plans for a successor for the S2000 after patents and trademark filings for what would be the Honda Sports Vision Gran Turismo surfaced in 2015, following the launch of the aforementioned concept car specifically designed for the Gran Turismo series. During the 2009 announcement of the vehicle's production end, Honda reported that worldwide sales through the end of 2008 totaled 110,673 units. The final official production figure was 113,889 by the end of 2009. Different sources indicate different sales numbers for Europe, presumably because Honda indicates final numbers including States entered the EU during the production run, but it should be around 19,800-20,700. On the UK market more than 70% of the originally registered cars still remain, means currently nearly 6,300 cars registered out of 8,500 sold.

Calendar Year	U.S.	Europe	Japan	Canada	Total built
1999	3,400	1,179	7,209	332	17,059
2000	6,797	3,955	3,422	412	15,321
2001	9,682	2,197	1,913	401	13,882
2002	9,684	2,537	1,471	336	15,334
2003	7,888	2,095	961	238	11,088
2004	7,320	2,036	1,087	250	10,415
2005	7,780	1,795	981	212	10,672
2006	6,271	1,474	1,225	146	9,328
2007	4,302	1,116	997	123	5,913
2008	2,538	709	1,228	65	3,581
2009	795	680	1,122	49	1,296
2010*	85	20	42	21	0
2011*	2	0	3	0	0
Total	66,544	19,793	21,661	2,585	113,889

*Note: No new cars were produced in 2010 and 2011; sales represent clearance of residual inventory.
Figures are not directly comparable as they are obtained through different methodologies in different markets.
