= 2026 Australian Drivers' Championship =

Motor racing competition

The 2026 Hankook Australian Drivers' Championship was a motor racing championship in Australia. It was the third running of the championship created in 2024 when its sanctioning body, the Australian Auto Sport Alliance, secured the rights to the Australian Drivers' Championship title dating back to 1957. The series is a spec series using the open-wheel Hyper Racer X1.

The 2026 season started on 13 March at The Bend Motorsport Park and ran over six race weekends. Ironclad ID driver Damon Sterling entered the season as the reigning champion, but only contested the opening round. Harry Strik, driving for Montgomery Haulage / Ringwood Kart Centre, clinched the Drivers' Championship at the final round of the season, edging out Lucas Stasi of Lucas Stasi Racing on the dropped-score rule.

== Teams and drivers ==
All drivers competed with a Hyper Racer X1 car powered by a Suzuki Hayabusa engine on Hankook tires. All teams and drivers were Australian-registered.

Team	No.	Driver	Rounds
Ironclad ID	1	Damon Sterling	1
Hyper Racer	2	Dean Crooke	2–6
Toplyne Concreting	4	Royce Lyne	5–6
Summons Racing	4	Aaron Imbach	1–2
Summons Racing	12	Rob Summons	2
Omnitude Adventures	5	Christopher Carydias	All
Privateer	11	Stephen Donnellan	1–4, 6
Pakelo Lubricants Carbon Racing	14	Jack Lewis	All
Pakelo Lubricants Carbon Racing	37	Kalen Chin	3–5
Pakelo Lubricants Carbon Racing	38	Zachary Catlin	All
Stoke Foiling	19	Hamish Leighton	1–2
Peter Nowlan	23	Peter Nowlan	2–3, 5–6
Controltech Solutions	24	Brenton Davey	1–5
Above All Concrete	25	Josh Gardiner	1, 3–6
Driveght.com.au/RPM86	33	Ashwin Dyall	3–4
Lucas Stasi Racing	34	Lucas Stasi	All
SimworX Simulators	48	Luke Klaver	4
Privateer	55	Robbert Knight	6
Montgomery Haulage / Ringwood Kart Centre	63	Harry Strik	All
Ausnets	68	Terry Knowles	1–2, 4, 6
Spectre Property	74	Bradley Smith	All
Justin Yuen Motorsport	77	Justin Yuen	All
LeMans Entertainment	82	Rocco Spinley	All
Quad Lock	88	Chris Peters	1–2, 4–6
Privateer	90	Darren Tucker	6
RAW Australia Roofing	95	Rory McKercher	1, 3

== Calendar ==
The 2026 calendar was first announced on 8 January 2026. The final round, initially scheduled to be run at Calder Park Raceway, was later relocated to Phillip Island Grand Prix Circuit, marking the series' debut at that track.

Round		Circuit	Date	Support Bill	Map of circuit locations
1	R1	(South Australia) The Bend Motorsport Park, Tailem Bend	13 March	TA2 Muscle Car Series; Formula RX8; Legend Car Australia Asphalt Series; Australian Formula Ford Championship; Production Sports Car Racing Victoria	2026 Australian Drivers' Championship is located in Australia
1	R2	(South Australia) The Bend Motorsport Park, Tailem Bend	14 March	TA2 Muscle Car Series; Formula RX8; Legend Car Australia Asphalt Series; Australian Formula Ford Championship; Production Sports Car Racing Victoria	2026 Australian Drivers' Championship is located in Australia
1	R3	(South Australia) The Bend Motorsport Park, Tailem Bend	14 March	TA2 Muscle Car Series; Formula RX8; Legend Car Australia Asphalt Series; Australian Formula Ford Championship; Production Sports Car Racing Victoria	2026 Australian Drivers' Championship is located in Australia
1	R4	(South Australia) The Bend Motorsport Park, Tailem Bend	14 March	TA2 Muscle Car Series; Formula RX8; Legend Car Australia Asphalt Series; Australian Formula Ford Championship; Production Sports Car Racing Victoria	2026 Australian Drivers' Championship is located in Australia
2	R1	(Victoria (state)) Calder Park Raceway, Melbourne	18 April	BMW Driver's Cup; Production Sports Car Racing Victoria; Victorian Excel Racing Championship Series; Victorian Super TT Championship; Victorian V8 Series	2026 Australian Drivers' Championship is located in Australia
2	R2	(Victoria (state)) Calder Park Raceway, Melbourne	19 April	BMW Driver's Cup; Production Sports Car Racing Victoria; Victorian Excel Racing Championship Series; Victorian Super TT Championship; Victorian V8 Series	2026 Australian Drivers' Championship is located in Australia
2	R3	(Victoria (state)) Calder Park Raceway, Melbourne	19 April	BMW Driver's Cup; Production Sports Car Racing Victoria; Victorian Excel Racing Championship Series; Victorian Super TT Championship; Victorian V8 Series	2026 Australian Drivers' Championship is located in Australia
2	R4	(Victoria (state)) Calder Park Raceway, Melbourne	19 April	BMW Driver's Cup; Production Sports Car Racing Victoria; Victorian Excel Racing Championship Series; Victorian Super TT Championship; Victorian V8 Series	2026 Australian Drivers' Championship is located in Australia
3	R1	(New South Wales) One Raceway, Goulburn	20 June	Formula RX8; Legend Car Australia Asphalt Series; Stock Cars Australia National Series; AASA Tin Tops Series	2026 Australian Drivers' Championship is located in Australia
3	R2	(New South Wales) One Raceway, Goulburn	20 June	Formula RX8; Legend Car Australia Asphalt Series; Stock Cars Australia National Series; AASA Tin Tops Series	2026 Australian Drivers' Championship is located in Australia
3	R3	(New South Wales) One Raceway, Goulburn	21 June	Formula RX8; Legend Car Australia Asphalt Series; Stock Cars Australia National Series; AASA Tin Tops Series	2026 Australian Drivers' Championship is located in Australia
3	R4	(New South Wales) One Raceway, Goulburn	21 June	Formula RX8; Legend Car Australia Asphalt Series; Stock Cars Australia National Series; AASA Tin Tops Series	2026 Australian Drivers' Championship is located in Australia
3	R5	(New South Wales) One Raceway, Goulburn	21 June	Formula RX8; Legend Car Australia Asphalt Series; Stock Cars Australia National Series; AASA Tin Tops Series	2026 Australian Drivers' Championship is located in Australia
4	R1	(New South Wales) Sydney Motorsport Park, Eastern Creek	17 July	Legend Car Australia Asphalt Series; Australian Production Car Series; Australian Formula Ford Championship; Production Sports Car Racing Victoria; TA2 Muscle Car Series	2026 Australian Drivers' Championship is located in Australia
4	R2	(New South Wales) Sydney Motorsport Park, Eastern Creek	17 July	Legend Car Australia Asphalt Series; Australian Production Car Series; Australian Formula Ford Championship; Production Sports Car Racing Victoria; TA2 Muscle Car Series	2026 Australian Drivers' Championship is located in Australia
4	R3	(New South Wales) Sydney Motorsport Park, Eastern Creek	18 July	Legend Car Australia Asphalt Series; Australian Production Car Series; Australian Formula Ford Championship; Production Sports Car Racing Victoria; TA2 Muscle Car Series	2026 Australian Drivers' Championship is located in Australia
4	R4	(New South Wales) Sydney Motorsport Park, Eastern Creek	18 July	Legend Car Australia Asphalt Series; Australian Production Car Series; Australian Formula Ford Championship; Production Sports Car Racing Victoria; TA2 Muscle Car Series	2026 Australian Drivers' Championship is located in Australia
5	R1	(Victoria (state)) Winton Motor Raceway, Winton	3 October	Victorian Formula Vee Championship; Victorian Superkart Championship; Victorian Super TT Championship	2026 Australian Drivers' Championship is located in Australia
5	R2	(Victoria (state)) Winton Motor Raceway, Winton	4 October	Victorian Formula Vee Championship; Victorian Superkart Championship; Victorian Super TT Championship	2026 Australian Drivers' Championship is located in Australia
5	R3	(Victoria (state)) Winton Motor Raceway, Winton	4 October	Victorian Formula Vee Championship; Victorian Superkart Championship; Victorian Super TT Championship	2026 Australian Drivers' Championship is located in Australia
5	R4	(Victoria (state)) Winton Motor Raceway, Winton	4 October	Victorian Formula Vee Championship; Victorian Superkart Championship; Victorian Super TT Championship	2026 Australian Drivers' Championship is located in Australia
6	R1	(Victoria (state)) Phillip Island Grand Prix Circuit, Ventnor	21 November	Australian Super TT Championship; Australian Trans-Am Series; National Sports Sedan Series; First Focus Radical Cup Australia; Victorian Formula Vee Championship	2026 Australian Drivers' Championship is located in Australia
6	R2	(Victoria (state)) Phillip Island Grand Prix Circuit, Ventnor	21 November	Australian Super TT Championship; Australian Trans-Am Series; National Sports Sedan Series; First Focus Radical Cup Australia; Victorian Formula Vee Championship	2026 Australian Drivers' Championship is located in Australia
6	R3	(Victoria (state)) Phillip Island Grand Prix Circuit, Ventnor	22 November	Australian Super TT Championship; Australian Trans-Am Series; National Sports Sedan Series; First Focus Radical Cup Australia; Victorian Formula Vee Championship	2026 Australian Drivers' Championship is located in Australia
6	R4	(Victoria (state)) Phillip Island Grand Prix Circuit, Ventnor	22 November	Australian Super TT Championship; Australian Trans-Am Series; National Sports Sedan Series; First Focus Radical Cup Australia; Victorian Formula Vee Championship	2026 Australian Drivers' Championship is located in Australia
6	R5	(Victoria (state)) Phillip Island Grand Prix Circuit, Ventnor	22 November	Australian Super TT Championship; Australian Trans-Am Series; National Sports Sedan Series; First Focus Radical Cup Australia; Victorian Formula Vee Championship	2026 Australian Drivers' Championship is located in Australia

== Race results ==
Round		Circuit	Pole position	Fastest lap	Winning driver	Winning team
1	R1	(South Australia) The Bend Motorsport Park	Harry Strik	Harry Strik	Damon Sterling	Ironclad ID
1	R2	(South Australia) The Bend Motorsport Park		Harry Strik	Damon Sterling	Ironclad ID
1	R3	(South Australia) The Bend Motorsport Park		Harry Strik	Damon Sterling	Ironclad ID
1	R4	(South Australia) The Bend Motorsport Park		Harry Strik	Bradley Smith	Spectre Property
2	R1	(Victoria (state)) Calder Park Raceway	Lucas Stasi	Bradley Smith	Lucas Stasi	Lucas Stasi Racing
2	R2	(Victoria (state)) Calder Park Raceway		Rocco Spinley	Bradley Smith	Spectre Property
2	R3	(Victoria (state)) Calder Park Raceway		Lucas Stasi	Bradley Smith	Spectre Property
2	R4	(Victoria (state)) Calder Park Raceway		Zachary Catlin	Bradley Smith	Spectre Property
3	R1	(New South Wales) One Raceway	Harry Strik	Harry Strik	Harry Strik	Montgomery Haulage / Ringwood Kart Centre
3	R2	(New South Wales) One Raceway		Harry Strik	Harry Strik	Montgomery Haulage / Ringwood Kart Centre
3	R3	(New South Wales) One Raceway		Harry Strik	Harry Strik	Montgomery Haulage / Ringwood Kart Centre
3	R4	(New South Wales) One Raceway		Harry Strik	Harry Strik	Montgomery Haulage / Ringwood Kart Centre
3	R5	(New South Wales) One Raceway		Brenton Davey	Zachary Catlin	Pakelo Lubricants Carbon Racing
4	R1	(New South Wales) Sydney Motorsport Park	Harry Strik	Kalen Chin	Kalen Chin	Pakelo Lubricants Carbon Racing
4	R2	(New South Wales) Sydney Motorsport Park		Kalen Chin	Kalen Chin	Pakelo Lubricants Carbon Racing
4	R3	(New South Wales) Sydney Motorsport Park		Rocco Spinley	Lucas Stasi	Lucas Stasi Racing
4	R4	(New South Wales) Sydney Motorsport Park		Kalen Chin	Harry Strik	Montgomery Haulage / Ringwood Kart Centre
5	R1	(Victoria (state)) Winton Motor Raceway	Harry Strik	Harry Strik	Harry Strik	Montgomery Haulage / Ringwood Kart Centre
5	R2	(Victoria (state)) Winton Motor Raceway		Harry Strik	Harry Strik	Montgomery Haulage / Ringwood Kart Centre
5	R3	(Victoria (state)) Winton Motor Raceway		Royce Lyne	Harry Strik	Montgomery Haulage / Ringwood Kart Centre
5	R4	(Victoria (state)) Winton Motor Raceway		Harry Strik	Harry Strik	Montgomery Haulage / Ringwood Kart Centre
6	R1	(Victoria (state)) Phillip Island Grand Prix Circuit	Royce Lyne	Royce Lyne	Justin Yuen	Justin Yuen Motorsport
6	R2	(Victoria (state)) Phillip Island Grand Prix Circuit		Royce Lyne	Rocco Spinley	LeMans Entertainment
6	R3	(Victoria (state)) Phillip Island Grand Prix Circuit		Zachary Catlin	Rocco Spinley	LeMans Entertainment
6	R4	(Victoria (state)) Phillip Island Grand Prix Circuit		Harry Strik	Harry Strik	Montgomery Haulage / Ringwood Kart Centre
6	R5	(Victoria (state)) Phillip Island Grand Prix Circuit		Royce Lyne	Rocco Spinley	LeMans Entertainment

== Season report ==
The third AASA-sanctioned Australian Drivers' Championship began in March at The Bend Motorsport Park with pole position for Harry Strik. Ironclad ID's reigning champion Damon Sterling got the better start to the first race, however, and led from start to finish, with Strik taking second ahead of Spectre Property's Bradley Smith. Sterling won once again in race two as Strik ran off track and fell to fifth, conceding the podium to Smith and Justin Yuen. Race three saw the same top three as race two, before Sterling retired after his engine blew up in race four. That allowed Smith to take the final win of the weekend ahead of Hamish Leighton and Yuen, while he also took a narrow lead in the standings.

The second round was held at Calder Park Raceway, where privateer Lucas Stasi took pole position in qualifying ahead of Controltech Solutions' Brenton Davey. Davey quickly slipped back in the first race, allowing Stasi to pull away and win while Smith and Carbon Racing's Zachary Catlin debated second. Race two saw Stasi and Smith duel over the win, with Smith coming out ahead. Smith then collected two more victories, one after colliding with Stasi in race three, while Davey and LeMans Entertainment's Rocco Spinley collected a third and a second place each. With pre-event second-placed driver Sterling absent, Smith was therefore able to greatly expand his points standings over Catlin and Stasi.

Round three at One Raceway held five races instead of the usual four, and Strik took pole position in qualifying for the first one. Stasi overtook him in the middle of the first race, but Strik was able to get back past him to take his maiden victory. Hyper Racer's Dean Crooke took third, before Strik and Stasi doubled up in race two to finish first and second again. This time, it was points leader Smith who took the final podium spot. Race three saw another unchallenged victory for Strik, with Stasi continuing his streak in second and Crooke also returning to the podium. Race four also brought no change to the top two positions as series rookie Rocco Spinley took third for LeMans Entertainment. A spin and a retirement for Strik in the final race finally handed victory to another driver, as Catlin took it ahead of Stasi, who was now second in the standings, 120 points behind Smith.

Championship leader Smith withdrew his entry for round five at Sydney Motorsport Park, which began with pole position for Strik, but a spin at the first turn of the opening race saw him finish the first race in eleventh. The win in went to Carbon Racing's Kalen Chin in just his second race weekend in the category. Stasi took second ahead of Spinley, before Chin doubled up with another victory in race two, again ahead of Stasi, with SimworX Simulators driver Luke Klaver third. In race three, Stasi was able to get ahead of Chin to break his streak of second places with a win, before Strik was able to bounce back with victory in race four. In absence of Smith, Stasi took the championship lead by 69 points.

Round six at Winton Motor Raceway saw the return of Smith, but the weekend belonged to Strik from start to finish. He set the fastest lap in qualifying to claim pole position, before leading every lap across all four races to sweep the weekend. Smith took second place in the first two races, leading Catlin in both events, before he dropped off the podium in race three and four. That opened the door for Chin to add two more second places to his campaign as Yuen took third place on both occasions. Points leader Stasi finished all four races in the top five, but still saw his lead shortened to just 39 points, while Strik's four wins saw him move to third place, now only 44 points behind the leader.

== Championship standings ==
=== Scoring system ===
Points were awarded as follows:

Qualifying position	**1st**	**2nd**	**3rd**	**4th**	**5th**	**6th**	**7th**	**8th**	**9th**	**10th**	**11th**	**12th**	**13th**	**14th**	**15th**
Qualifying points	30	24	21	19	17	15	13	11	9	8	7	6	5	4	3

Race position	**1st**	**2nd**	**3rd**	**4th**	**5th**	**6th**	**7th**	**8th**	**9th**	**10th**	**11th**	**12th**	**13th**	**14th**	**15th**
Race points	60	48	42	40	38	36	34	32	30	28	26	24	22	20	18
Race position	**16th**	**17th**	**18th**	**19th**	**20th**	**21st**	**22nd**	**23rd**	**24th**	**25th**	**26th**	**27th**	**28th**	**29th**	**30th**
Race points	16	14	12	10	9	8	7	6	5	4	3	2	1	1	1

The worst weekend points-wise for each driver was dropped to form the final score.

=== Drivers' championship ===
Pos	Driver	BEN (South Australia)				CAL (Victoria (state))				ONE (New South Wales)					SYD (New South Wales)				WIN (Victoria (state))				PHI (Victoria (state))					Pts
Pos	Driver	R1	R2	R3	R4	R1	R2	R3	R4	R1	R2	R3	R4	R5	R1	R2	R3	R4	R1	R2	R3	R4	R1	R2	R3	R4	R5	Pts
1	Harry Strik	**2**^{1}	5	Ret	5	(WD)	(WD)	(WD)	(WD)	**1**^{1}	1	1	1	Ret	**11**^{1}	12	4	1	**1**^{1}	1	1	1	4^{2}	3	3	1	8	1114
2	Lucas Stasi	(6^{6})	(4)	(WD)	(WD)	**1**^{1}	2	8	4	2^{2}	2	2	2	2	2^{2}	2	1	Ret	4^{6}	4	4	5	7^{3}	8	5	2	6	1036
3	Bradley Smith	3^{3}	2	2	1	2^{4}	1	1	1	4^{3}	3	5	4	5	(WD)	(WD)	(WD)	(WD)	2^{2}	2	7	4	Ret	10	11	7	5	1005
4	Rocco Spinley	(11^{10})	(7)	(Ret)	(4)	7^{7}	4	3	2	Ret^{6}	7	4	3	8	3^{7}	8	5	4	9^{9}	8	5	6	3^{5}	1	1	16	1	905
5	Zachary Catlin	4^{5}	9	Ret	6	3^{2}	5	4	5	7^{8}	6	7	6	1	8^{3}	11	6	5	(3^{4})	(3)	(Ret)	(WD)	5^{6}	6	8	5	7	862
6	Justin Yuen	5^{4}	3	3	3	(WD)	(WD)	(WD)	(WD)	8^{12}	8	9	10	Ret	DNS^{6}	7	7	12	6^{5}	6	3	3	1^{8}	4	4	14	4	802
7	Jack Lewis	10^{8}	10	4	8	9^{6}	6	6	8	9^{10}	10	13	11	11	4^{11}	4	10	10	10^{12}	11	9	11	12^{12}	11	12	6	11	713
8	Dean Crooke					5^{8}	Ret	Ret	6	3^{4}	4	3	5	3	5^{5}	5	3	2	WD	WD	WD	WD	6^{7}	5	6	4	3	696
9	Brenton Davey	9^{12}	6	9	Ret	4^{3}	3	2	3	10^{9}	11	8	8	7	9^{8}	9	8	Ret	7^{8}	7	10	9						696
10	Kalen Chin									6^{5}	9	6	7	4	1^{4}	1	2	3	Ret^{3}	5	2	2						577
11	Stephen Donnellan	14^{11}	Ret	8	7	DNS	13	11	13	13^{11}	12	10	13	9	6^{12}	6	9	7					8^{4}	9	Ret	13	9	571
12	Chris Peters	15^{15}	13	5	Ret	Ret^{9}	7	5	14						14^{13}	13	12	8	8^{11}	9	8	10	9^{11}	Ret	15	9	13	521
13	Josh Gardiner	8^{9}	8	7	Ret					5^{7}	5	Ret	9	6	10^{10}	10	11	6	WD	WD	WD	WD	10^{9}	7	7	11	Ret	519
14	Christopher Carydias	13^{13}	11	Ret	9	12^{10}	8	9	7	12^{13}	13	12	Ret	Ret	13^{14}	14	14	11	Ret^{10}	10	Ret	8	(11^{13})	(Ret)	(WD)	(WD)	(WD)	446
15	Royce Lyne																		5^{7}	Ret	6	7	**2**^{1}	2	2	3	Ret	337
16	Peter Nowlan					DNS	10	7	9	DNS	DNS	11	14	10					DNS	12	WD	WD	DNS	DNS	10	8	2	298
17	Hamish Leighton	7^{7}	12	6	2	10^{12}	9	10	10																			275
18	Terry Knowles	12^{14}	WD	WD	WD	8^{11}	11	12	11						WD	WD	WD	WD					15^{10}	Ret	9	15	Ret	217
19	Damon Sterling	1^{2}	1	1	Ret																							204
20	Ashwin Dyall									11^{14}	Ret	14	12	12	12^{15}	15	13	Ret										165
21	Luke Klaver														7^{9}	3	15	9										133
22	Darren Tucker																						13^{14}	12	13	10	10	128
23	Rob Summons					11^{13}	12	13	12																			101
24	Robbert Knight																						14^{15}	DSQ	14	12	12	91
25	Aaron Imbach	WD	WD	WD	WD	6^{5}	14	Ret	Ret																			73
—	Rory McKercher	WD	WD	WD	WD																							0
Pos	Driver	R1	R2	R3	R4	R1	R2	R3	R4	R1	R2	R3	R4	R5	R1	R2	R3	R4	R1	R2	R3	R4	R1	R2	R3	R4	R5	Pts
Pos	Driver	BEN (South Australia)				CAL (Victoria (state))				ONE (New South Wales)					SYD (New South Wales)				WIN (Victoria (state))				PHI (Victoria (state))					Pts

Colour	Result
Gold	Winner
Silver	Second place
Bronze	Third place
Green	Points classification
Blue	Non-points classification
Blue	Non-classified finish (NC)
Purple	Retired, not classified (Ret)
Red	Did not qualify (DNQ)
Red	Did not pre-qualify (DNPQ)
Black	Disqualified (DSQ)
White	Did not start (DNS)
White	Withdrew (WD)
White	Race cancelled (C)
Blank	Did not practice (DNP)
Blank	Did not arrive (DNA)
Blank	Excluded (EX)

**Bold** – Pole

Italics – Fastest Lap

^{1} ^{2 ... 15} – points-paying qualifying positions

† – Driver did not finish the race,
but was classified
