= 2025 Australian Drivers' Championship =

Motor racing competition

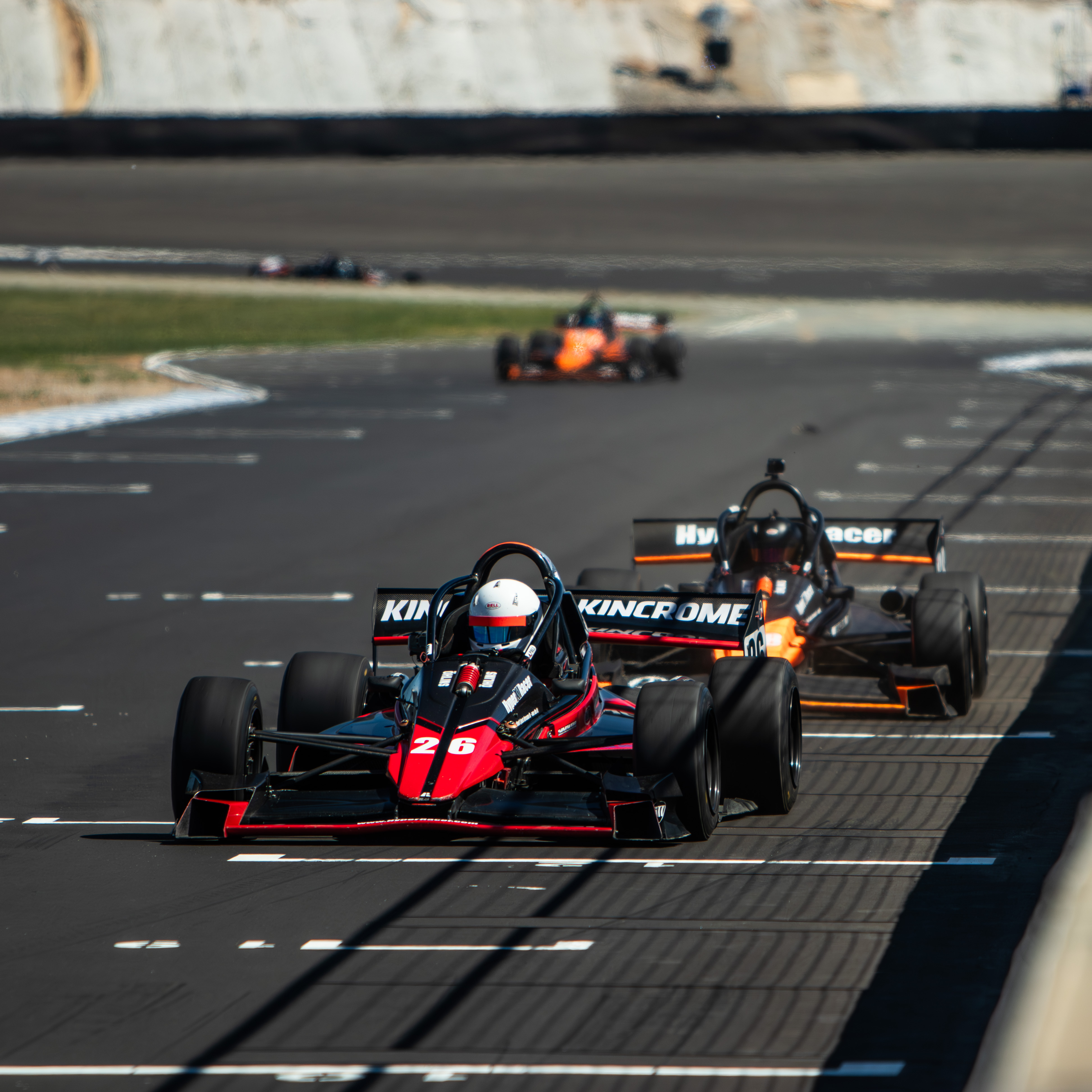
Damon Sterling, driving for Ironclad ID, successfully defended his Drivers' Championship title.

The 2025 Hankook Australian Drivers' Championship was a motor racing championship in Australia. It was the second running of the championship created in 2024 when its sanctioning body, the Australian Auto Sport Alliance secured the rights to the Australian Drivers' Championship title dating back to 1957. The series was a spec series using the open-wheel Hyper Racer X1.

The 2025 season started on 1 March at Winton Motor Raceway, was run over six race weekends and finished on 2 November at the same venue.

Ironclad ID driver Damon Sterling entered the season as the reigning champion and successfully defended his championship title with one round to spare. Stoke Foiling's Hamish Leighton won the Masters' Championship, also clinching it at the penultimate round of the season.

== Teams and drivers ==
All drivers competed with a Hyper Racer X1 car powered by a Suzuki Hayabusa engine on Hankook tires. Drivers aged 40 and above were able take part in the Masters' Australian Drivers’ Championship. All teams and drivers were Australian-registered.

Team	No.	Driver	Status	Rounds
Hyper Racer	2	Dean Crooke		All
Summons Racing	4	Aaron Imbach		6
Summons Racing	12	Rob Summons		1–5
Summons Racing	33	Adam Nicolson		1
Summons Racing	33	Kyle Gurton		2–6
Summons Racing	59	Ivan Vantagiato		1, 3
Summons Racing	59	Christian Sasso		2
Summons Racing	07	Niko French		All
Omnitude Investments	5	Christopher Carydias	M	1–3, 5–6
Pakelo Lubricants Carbon Racing	6	Hayden Crossland		All
Pakelo Lubricants Carbon Racing	14	Jack Lewis		All
Pakelo Lubricants Carbon Racing	33	Ashwin Dyall		6
Justin Yuen Motorsport	8	Justin Yuen		All
Stoke Foiling	19	Hamish Leighton	M	All
Controltech Solutions	24	Brenton Davey		1–5
Above All Concrete	25	Josh Gardiner		All (Note: Gardiner entered the final round as a non-scoring driver)
Ironclad ID	26	Damon Sterling		All
Ironclad ID	27	Bastien Treptel		1–3
Lucas Stasi Racing	34	Lucas Stasi		All
Activ Digital	38	Zachary Catlin		1–6
SimworX Simulators	48	Luke Klaver		5
Montgomery Haulage / Ringwood Kart Centre	63	Harry Strik		6
Spectre Property	74	Bradley Smith		2–6
Quad Lock	88	Chris Peters	M	1, 3–6
Percat Automotive	89	Mitchell McGarry		3–4
RAW Australia Roofing	95	Rory McKercher		All
Privateer	23	Peter Nowlan	M	1–3, 6
Privateer	41	Anton Zhouk		1–3, 5

Icon	Legend
M	Master

== Calendar ==
The 2025 calendar was announced on 24 December 2024, with a round at One Raceway added a few days later to bring the total up to six events. The series made its debut at Sydney Motorsport Park.

Round		Circuit	Date	Support Bill	Map of circuit locations
1	R1	(Victoria (state)) Winton Motor Raceway, Winton	1 March	Formula RX8; Australian Super TT Championship; Formula Ford: Stars & Renegades Series; Legend Car Australia Asphalt Series; TA2 Muscle Car Series	2025 Australian Drivers' Championship is located in Australia
1	R2	(Victoria (state)) Winton Motor Raceway, Winton	2 March	Formula RX8; Australian Super TT Championship; Formula Ford: Stars & Renegades Series; Legend Car Australia Asphalt Series; TA2 Muscle Car Series	2025 Australian Drivers' Championship is located in Australia
1	R3	(Victoria (state)) Winton Motor Raceway, Winton	2 March	Formula RX8; Australian Super TT Championship; Formula Ford: Stars & Renegades Series; Legend Car Australia Asphalt Series; TA2 Muscle Car Series	2025 Australian Drivers' Championship is located in Australia
1	R4	(Victoria (state)) Winton Motor Raceway, Winton	2 March	Formula RX8; Australian Super TT Championship; Formula Ford: Stars & Renegades Series; Legend Car Australia Asphalt Series; TA2 Muscle Car Series	2025 Australian Drivers' Championship is located in Australia
2	R1	(New South Wales) One Raceway, Goulburn	5 April	Clubman Championship; Series X3 New South Wales; New South Wales MX-5 Cup; Motor Racing Australia Super TT; Legend Car Australia Asphalt Series; Legend Car NSW Asphalt Series	2025 Australian Drivers' Championship is located in Australia
2	R2	(New South Wales) One Raceway, Goulburn	6 April	Clubman Championship; Series X3 New South Wales; New South Wales MX-5 Cup; Motor Racing Australia Super TT; Legend Car Australia Asphalt Series; Legend Car NSW Asphalt Series	2025 Australian Drivers' Championship is located in Australia
2	R3	(New South Wales) One Raceway, Goulburn	6 April	Clubman Championship; Series X3 New South Wales; New South Wales MX-5 Cup; Motor Racing Australia Super TT; Legend Car Australia Asphalt Series; Legend Car NSW Asphalt Series	2025 Australian Drivers' Championship is located in Australia
2	R4	(New South Wales) One Raceway, Goulburn	6 April	Clubman Championship; Series X3 New South Wales; New South Wales MX-5 Cup; Motor Racing Australia Super TT; Legend Car Australia Asphalt Series; Legend Car NSW Asphalt Series	2025 Australian Drivers' Championship is located in Australia
3	R1	(South Australia) The Bend Motorsport Park, Tailem Bend	3 May	Victorian V8 Series; Super Tin Top Racing Victoria; 2 Litre Sports Sedan Championship	2025 Australian Drivers' Championship is located in Australia
3	R2	(South Australia) The Bend Motorsport Park, Tailem Bend	3 May	Victorian V8 Series; Super Tin Top Racing Victoria; 2 Litre Sports Sedan Championship	2025 Australian Drivers' Championship is located in Australia
3	R3	(South Australia) The Bend Motorsport Park, Tailem Bend	4 May	Victorian V8 Series; Super Tin Top Racing Victoria; 2 Litre Sports Sedan Championship	2025 Australian Drivers' Championship is located in Australia
3	R4	(South Australia) The Bend Motorsport Park, Tailem Bend	4 May	Victorian V8 Series; Super Tin Top Racing Victoria; 2 Litre Sports Sedan Championship	2025 Australian Drivers' Championship is located in Australia
4	R1	(New South Wales) Sydney Motorsport Park, Eastern Creek	30 May	Formula RX8; Australian Super TT Championship; Formula Ford: Stars & Renegades Series; Legend Car Australia Asphalt Series; TA2 Muscle Car Series; Legend Car NSW Asphalt Series	2025 Australian Drivers' Championship is located in Australia
4	R2	(New South Wales) Sydney Motorsport Park, Eastern Creek	31 May	Formula RX8; Australian Super TT Championship; Formula Ford: Stars & Renegades Series; Legend Car Australia Asphalt Series; TA2 Muscle Car Series; Legend Car NSW Asphalt Series	2025 Australian Drivers' Championship is located in Australia
4	R3	(New South Wales) Sydney Motorsport Park, Eastern Creek	31 May	Formula RX8; Australian Super TT Championship; Formula Ford: Stars & Renegades Series; Legend Car Australia Asphalt Series; TA2 Muscle Car Series; Legend Car NSW Asphalt Series	2025 Australian Drivers' Championship is located in Australia
4	R4	(New South Wales) Sydney Motorsport Park, Eastern Creek	31 May	Formula RX8; Australian Super TT Championship; Formula Ford: Stars & Renegades Series; Legend Car Australia Asphalt Series; TA2 Muscle Car Series; Legend Car NSW Asphalt Series	2025 Australian Drivers' Championship is located in Australia
5	R1	(Victoria (state)) Calder Park Raceway, Melbourne	14 June	Victorian V8 Series; Victorian Super TT Championship; Hyundai Excel Association of Victoria; 2 Litre Sports Sedan Championship	2025 Australian Drivers' Championship is located in Australia
5	R2	(Victoria (state)) Calder Park Raceway, Melbourne	14 June	Victorian V8 Series; Victorian Super TT Championship; Hyundai Excel Association of Victoria; 2 Litre Sports Sedan Championship	2025 Australian Drivers' Championship is located in Australia
5	R3	(Victoria (state)) Calder Park Raceway, Melbourne	15 June	Victorian V8 Series; Victorian Super TT Championship; Hyundai Excel Association of Victoria; 2 Litre Sports Sedan Championship	2025 Australian Drivers' Championship is located in Australia
5	R4	(Victoria (state)) Calder Park Raceway, Melbourne	15 June	Victorian V8 Series; Victorian Super TT Championship; Hyundai Excel Association of Victoria; 2 Litre Sports Sedan Championship	2025 Australian Drivers' Championship is located in Australia
6	R1	(Victoria (state)) Winton Motor Raceway, Winton	1 November	Formula RX8; Australian Super TT Championship; Formula Ford: Stars & Renegades Series; Legend Car Australia Asphalt Series; TA2 Muscle Car Series	2025 Australian Drivers' Championship is located in Australia
6	R2	(Victoria (state)) Winton Motor Raceway, Winton	1 November	Formula RX8; Australian Super TT Championship; Formula Ford: Stars & Renegades Series; Legend Car Australia Asphalt Series; TA2 Muscle Car Series	2025 Australian Drivers' Championship is located in Australia
6	R3	(Victoria (state)) Winton Motor Raceway, Winton	2 November	Formula RX8; Australian Super TT Championship; Formula Ford: Stars & Renegades Series; Legend Car Australia Asphalt Series; TA2 Muscle Car Series	2025 Australian Drivers' Championship is located in Australia
6	R4	(Victoria (state)) Winton Motor Raceway, Winton	2 November	Formula RX8; Australian Super TT Championship; Formula Ford: Stars & Renegades Series; Legend Car Australia Asphalt Series; TA2 Muscle Car Series	2025 Australian Drivers' Championship is located in Australia

== Race results ==
Round		Circuit	Pole position	Fastest lap	Winning driver	Winning team	Masters' winner
1	R1	(Victoria (state)) Winton Motor Raceway	Damon Sterling	Dean Crooke	Damon Sterling	Ironclad ID	Hamish Leighton
1	R2	(Victoria (state)) Winton Motor Raceway		Hayden Crossland	Damon Sterling	Ironclad ID	Hamish Leighton
1	R3	(Victoria (state)) Winton Motor Raceway		Dean Crooke	Hayden Crossland	Pakelo Lubricants Carbon Racing	Hamish Leighton
1	R4	(Victoria (state)) Winton Motor Raceway		Damon Sterling	Hayden Crossland	Pakelo Lubricants Carbon Racing	Hamish Leighton
2	R1	(New South Wales) One Raceway	Damon Sterling	Damon Sterling	Damon Sterling	Ironclad ID	Hamish Leighton
2	R2	(New South Wales) One Raceway		Damon Sterling	Damon Sterling	Ironclad ID	Hamish Leighton
2	R3	(New South Wales) One Raceway		Bradley Smith	Damon Sterling	Ironclad ID	Hamish Leighton
2	R4	(New South Wales) One Raceway		Dean Crooke	Damon Sterling	Ironclad ID	Hamish Leighton
3	R1	(South Australia) The Bend Motorsport Park	Damon Sterling	Dean Crooke	Damon Sterling	Ironclad ID	Hamish Leighton
3	R2	(South Australia) The Bend Motorsport Park		Damon Sterling	Damon Sterling	Ironclad ID	Hamish Leighton
3	R3	(South Australia) The Bend Motorsport Park		Damon Sterling	Damon Sterling	Ironclad ID	Hamish Leighton
3	R4	(South Australia) The Bend Motorsport Park		Dean Crooke	Damon Sterling	Ironclad ID	no classified finishers
4	R1	(New South Wales) Sydney Motorsport Park	Hayden Crossland	Bradley Smith	Hamish Leighton	Stoke Foiling	Hamish Leighton
4	R2	(New South Wales) Sydney Motorsport Park		Damon Sterling	Damon Sterling	Ironclad ID	Hamish Leighton
4	R3	(New South Wales) Sydney Motorsport Park		Niko French	Damon Sterling	Ironclad ID	Hamish Leighton
4	R4	(New South Wales) Sydney Motorsport Park		Damon Sterling	Damon Sterling	Ironclad ID	Hamish Leighton
5	R1	(Victoria (state)) Calder Park Raceway	Hayden Crossland	Damon Sterling	Damon Sterling	Ironclad ID	Hamish Leighton
5	R2	(Victoria (state)) Calder Park Raceway		Damon Sterling	Damon Sterling	Ironclad ID	Chris Peters
5	R3	(Victoria (state)) Calder Park Raceway		Damon Sterling	Damon Sterling	Ironclad ID	Hamish Leighton
5	R4	(Victoria (state)) Calder Park Raceway		Damon Sterling	Damon Sterling	Ironclad ID	Hamish Leighton
6	R1	(Victoria (state)) Winton Motor Raceway	Damon Sterling	Damon Sterling	Damon Sterling	Ironclad ID	Chris Peters
6	R2	(Victoria (state)) Winton Motor Raceway		Damon Sterling	Damon Sterling	Ironclad ID	Chris Peters
6	R3	(Victoria (state)) Winton Motor Raceway		Lucas Stasi	Damon Sterling	Ironclad ID	Chris Peters
6	R4	(Victoria (state)) Winton Motor Raceway		Damon Sterling	Damon Sterling	Ironclad ID	Peter Nowlan

== Championship standings ==
=== Scoring system ===
Points were awarded as follows:

Position	**1st**	**2nd**	**3rd**	**4th**	**5th**	**6th**	**7th**	**8th**	**9th**	**10th**	**11th**	**12th**	**13th**	**14th**	**15th**	**16th**	**17th**	**18th**	**19th**
Points	25	20	18	17	16	15	14	13	12	11	10	9	8	7	6	5	4	3	2

The worst weekend points-wise for each driver was dropped to form the final score.

=== Drivers' championship ===
Pos	Driver	WIN1 (Victoria (state))				ONE (New South Wales)				BEN (South Australia)				SYD (New South Wales)				CAL (Victoria (state))				WIN2 (Victoria (state))				Pen.	Pts
Pos	Driver	R1	R2	R3	R4	R1	R2	R3	R4	R1	R2	R3	R4	R1	R2	R3	R4	R1	R2	R3	R4	R1	R2	R3	R4	Pen.	Pts
1	Damon Sterling	**1**	1	2	2	**1**	1	1	1	**1**	1	1	1	(13)	(1)	(1)	(1)	1	1	1	1	**1**	1	1	1		480
2	Dean Crooke	3	Ret	4	3	2	2	2	2	2	2	2	2	2	3	6	4	9	8	9	7	(5)	(Ret)	(12)	(10)		326
3	Kyle Gurton					6	6	4	3	3	4	Ret	5	5	6	3	2	2	3	2	2	13	15	10	6		296
4	Bradley Smith					18	7	3	5	11	16	10	6	3	5	4	6	3	2	3	3	4	5	6	5		288
5	Hamish Leighton **M**	6	5	6	4	11	4	5	4	5	5	4	Ret	1	2	2	5	6	DNS	7	5	(Ret)	(11)	(11)	(11)		286
6	Lucas Stasi	5	4	3	6	5	5	Ret	13	(WD)	(WD)	(WD)	(WD)	4	7	8	8	10	9	10	10	3	3	3	3		273
7	Niko French	4	3	5	5	(3)	(Ret)	(6)	(Ret)	6	6	5	4	6	Ret	5	3	16	16	8	4	6	8	5	7	16	256
8	Hayden Crossland	2	2	1	1	(4)	(3)	(Ret)	(Ret)	4	3	3	3	**DSQ**	DSQ	DSQ	DSQ	**DSQ**	DSQ	DSQ	DSQ	DSQ	4	4	2		250
9	Zachary Catlin	11	8	9	11	14	8	8	10	14	10	12	7	(9)	(8)	(11)	(Ret)	11	10	6	6	7	6	Ret	14		214
10	Justin Yuen	10	12	10	9	13	9	10	9	10	11	14	10	8	9	10	10	12	11	13	11	(9)	(Ret)	(15)	(12)		201
11	Brenton Davey	8	6	Ret	13	8	15	11	7	Ret	12	9	9	14	10	13	9	5	6	12	8						196
12	Jack Lewis	14	11	14	14	7	Ret	12	12	(15)	(Ret)	(15)	(13)	10	11	12	13	8	7	11	9	11	14	16	16		174
13	Josh Gardiner	(Ret)	(WD)	(WD)	(WD)	10	Ret	9	DNS	12	9	8	8	7	4	7	11	7	5	5	Ret	8	7	8	8		164
14	Rory McKercher	15	14	13	10	16	11	15	14	(WD)	(WD)	(WD)	(WD)	11	12	14	Ret	13	12	14	Ret	10	13	17	15		140
15	Chris Peters **M**	16	17	16	15					13	13	13	Ret	12	13	15	12	15	13	15	13	12	10	9	Ret		132
16	Christopher Carydias **M**	Ret	15	15	12	12	Ret	13	8	9	Ret	17	Ret					17	15	17	12	14	12	14	13		122
17	Peter Nowlan **M**	DNS	7	7	7	DNS	10	7	6	DNS	DNS	11	Ret									DNS	DNS	13	9		114
18	Bastien Treptel	12	10	8	Ret	9	16	Ret	DNS	8	8	16	11														91
19	Rob Summons	17	16	17	17	15	14	16	15	Ret	15	Ret	14	Ret	15	WD	WD	14	14	16	Ret						74
20	Anton Zhouk	13	13	11	16	17	12	14	11	DNS	Ret	WD	WD					WD	WD	WD	WD						61
21	Harry Strik																					2	2	2	Ret		60
22	Ivan Vantagiato	9	Ret	Ret	WD					7	7	6	16†														60
23	Mitchell McGarry									Ret	14	7	12	Ret	14	9	7										60
24	Luke Klaver																	4	4	4	Ret						48
25	Adam Nicolson	7	9	12	8																						48
26	Aaron Imbach																					DSQ	9	7	4		44
27	Christian Sasso					DNS	13	Ret	DNS																		8
—	Ashwin Dyall																					WD	WD	WD	WD		0
Pos	Driver	R1	R2	R3	R4	R1	R2	R3	R4	R1	R2	R3	R4	R1	R2	R3	R4	R1	R2	R3	R4	R1	R2	R3	R4	Pen.	Pts
Pos	Driver	WIN1 (Victoria (state))				ONE (New South Wales)				BEN (South Australia)				SYD (New South Wales)				CAL (Victoria (state))				WIN2 (Victoria (state))				Pen.	Pts

Colour	Result
Gold	Winner
Silver	Second place
Bronze	Third place
Green	Points classification
Blue	Non-points classification
Blue	Non-classified finish (NC)
Purple	Retired, not classified (Ret)
Red	Did not qualify (DNQ)
Red	Did not pre-qualify (DNPQ)
Black	Disqualified (DSQ)
White	Did not start (DNS)
White	Withdrew (WD)
White	Race cancelled (C)
Blank	Did not practice (DNP)
Blank	Did not arrive (DNA)
Blank	Excluded (EX)

**Bold** – Pole

Italics – Fastest Lap

† – Driver did not finish the race, but was classified
