= 2010 Armor All Gold Coast 600 =

2010 V8 supercar race

Coordinates: 27°59′23″S 153°25′40″E

(Queensland) 2010 Armor All Gold Coast 600
Event Information
- Round 11 of 14 in the 2010 V8 Supercar Championship Series
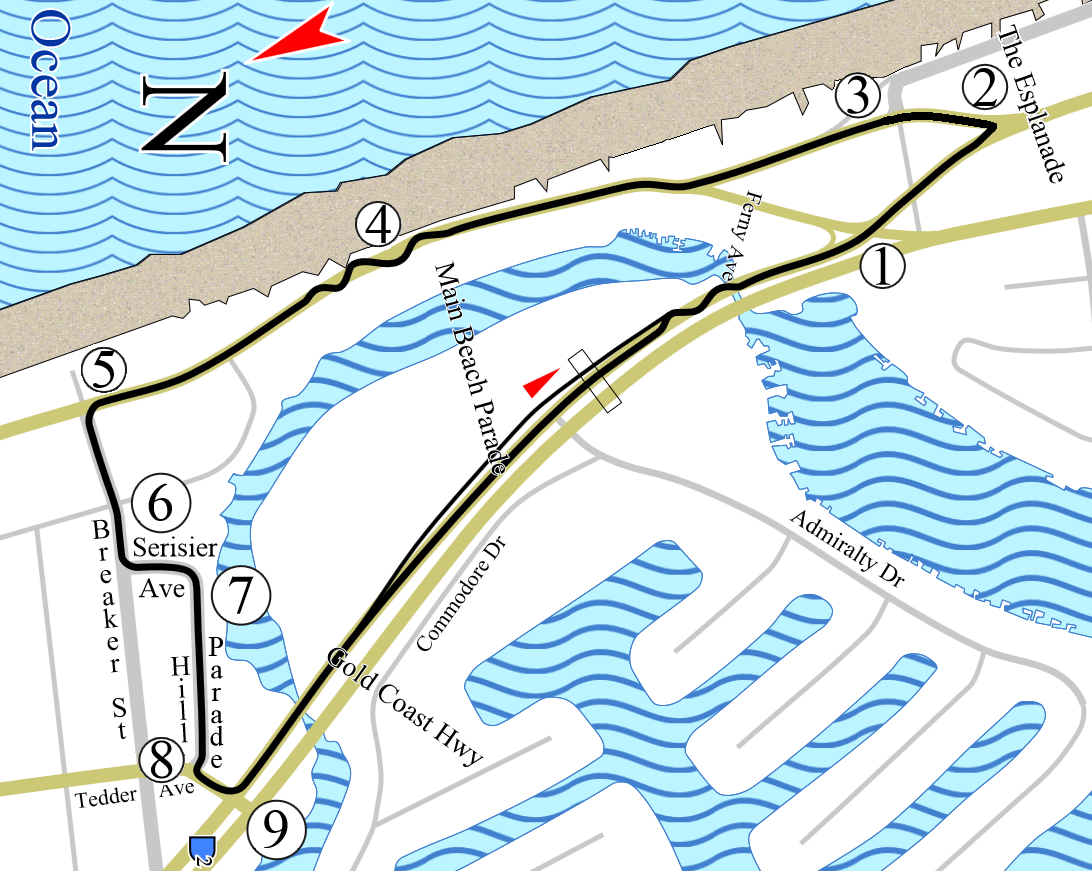
- Date: 22–24 October 2010
- Location: Surfers Paradise, Queensland
- Venue: Surfers Paradise Street Circuit
- Weather: Fine

Results
Race 1
Distance	102 laps	300 km
Pole position	Garth Tander; Holden Racing Team	1:12.6841
Winner	Garth Tander; Cameron McConville; Holden Racing Team	2:20:00.6981
Race 2
Distance	102 laps	300 km
Pole position	Mark Winterbottom; Ford Performance Racing	1:12.0389
Winner	Jamie Whincup; Steve Owen; Triple Eight Race Engineering	2:29:37.7468

The 2010 Armor All Gold Coast 600 was the eleventh event of the 2010 V8 Supercar Championship Series. It was held on the weekend of 22 to 24 October at the Surfers Paradise Street Circuit in Queensland. V8 Supercars became the naming right category of the event for the first time in 2010 after racing as a support category for international open wheel racing for many of the previous Surfers Paradise events. In 2009 V8 Supercar were the leading category but not the naming rights category as that had been previously marketed as a double header with A1 Grand Prix who failed to arrive.

In an altered format for 2010 the races would take place over two 300 kilometres (190 mi) races with a driver change in the first time a third co-driver event was held in an Australian touring car season since 1990. In an effort to keep the events former international flavour each V8 Supercar team has employed a driver with an 'international reputation' with many drivers coming from the IndyCar Series and the World Touring Car Championship.

== Race 21 ==
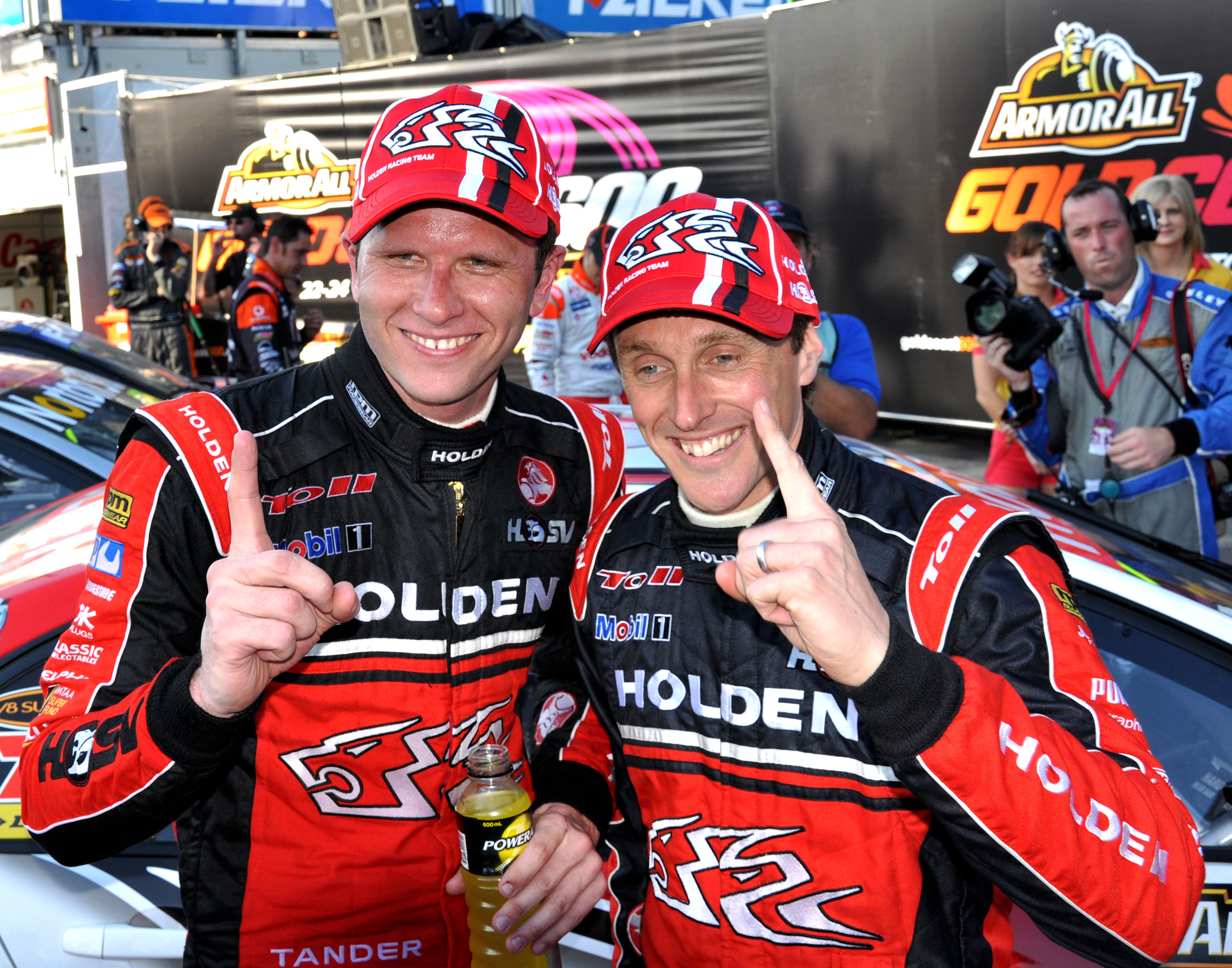
Garth Tander and Cameron McConville won the first race of the weekend.

Chaos erupted at the start. Cameron McConville launched away from Garth Tander's pole position, but crept on the line and would be assigned a ten-second pit penalty for a jumped start. Jacques Villeneuve, also to be penalised for a too quick start, and Luke Youlden collided at the first corner, with Villeneuve then spinning in front of the pack at the second corner after contact with Greg Ritter, causing damage to several cars. Will Davison stopped on the first lap after contact with the spinning Villeneuve. Dean Fiore also pulled in on the opening lap with Will Power an early stopper after losing all of his cars oil.

McConville led the early laps with Michael Caruso climbing through the field into second place. Steve Owen also climbed through the field into third ahead of Warren Luff. Repeated spoiler damage by Tiago Monteiro caused his retirement.

On lap 70 Garth Tander was assigned a mechanical black flag, it was assumed for a fuel leak, but as it transpired to be a leak from Tander's drink bottle the flag was withdrawn. Subsequently, Tander's car shed a headlight cluster into the path of pursuing cars to no penalty, causing controversy amongst team principals and officials in the pits.

Courtney took the lead from Tander just prior to a safety car being called for Andrew Thompson, parked in the first chicane. Immediately at the lap 84 restart, Greg Murphy and Todd Kelly stopped in the second corner after Kelly spun.

Teammates Jason Bright and Jason Richards tangled on another safety car restart on lap 97, shortly after race leader James Courtney was penalised a drive-through for slowing down after the safety car pulled away from the queue.

Garth Tander pulled out to win from Craig Lowndes and Shane van Gisbergen. Michael Caruso finished fourth from Alex Davison, Jamie Whincup and Jason Bright.

Pos.	No.	Drivers	Team	Car	Laps	Time/Retired	Grid
1	2	(Australia) Garth Tander (Australia) Cameron McConville	Holden Racing Team	Holden Commodore (VE)	102	2:20:00.6981	1
2	888	(Australia) Craig Lowndes (United Kingdom) Andy Priaulx	Triple Eight Race Engineering	Holden Commodore (VE)	102	+ 1.855	6
3	9	(New Zealand) Shane van Gisbergen (New Zealand) John McIntyre	Stone Brothers Racing	Ford Falcon (FG)	102	+ 3.930	13
4	34	(Australia) Michael Caruso (United States) Patrick Long	Garry Rogers Motorsport	Holden Commodore (VE)	102	+ 5.232	9
5	4	(Australia) Alex Davison (Australia) David Brabham	Stone Brothers Racing	Ford Falcon (FG)	102	+ 25.043	21
6	1	(Australia) Jamie Whincup (Australia) Steve Owen	Triple Eight Race Engineering	Holden Commodore (VE)	102	+ 25.441	8
7	14	(Australia) Jason Bright (Switzerland) Alain Menu	Brad Jones Racing	Holden Commodore (VE)	102	+ 26.621	28
8	19	(Australia) Jonathon Webb (France) Sébastien Bourdais	Tekno Autosports	Ford Falcon (FG)	102	+ 26.732	22
9	21	(Australia) Karl Reindler (Italy) Fabrizio Giovanardi	Britek Motorsport	Holden Commodore (VE)	102	+ 39.562	23
10	18	(Australia) James Courtney (Australia) Warren Luff	Dick Johnson Racing	Ford Falcon (FG)	102	+ 39.750	2
11	11	(Australia) Jason Bargwanna (Canada) Alex Tagliani	Kelly Racing	Holden Commodore (VE)	102	+ 44.146	20
12	39	(Australia) Russell Ingall (Australia) Jack Perkins	Paul Morris Motorsport	Holden Commodore (VE)	102	+ 45.997	15
13	51	(New Zealand) Greg Murphy (France) Yvan Muller	Paul Morris Motorsport	Holden Commodore (VE)	102	+ 48.219	19
14	15	(Australia) Rick Kelly (Australia) Owen Kelly	Kelly Racing	Holden Commodore (VE)	102	+ 1:11.057	11
15	8	(New Zealand) Jason Richards (Australia) Andrew Jones	Brad Jones Racing	Holden Commodore (VE)	101	+ 1 lap	14
16	17	(Australia) Steven Johnson (United Kingdom) Dario Franchitti	Dick Johnson Racing	Ford Falcon (FG)	101	+ 1 lap	12
17	24	(New Zealand) Fabian Coulthard (Australia) David Reynolds	Walkinshaw Racing	Holden Commodore (VE)	101	+ 1 lap	16
18	47	(Australia) Tim Slade (Brazil) Hélio Castroneves	James Rosenberg Racing	Ford Falcon (FG)	101	+ 1 lap	18
19	33	(Australia) Lee Holdsworth (Australia) Greg Ritter	Garry Rogers Motorsport	Holden Commodore (VE)	101	+ 1 lap	5
20	7	(Australia) Todd Kelly (New Zealand) Scott Dixon	Kelly Racing	Holden Commodore (VE)	101	+ 1 lap	17
21	5	(Australia) Mark Winterbottom (Australia) Luke Youlden	Ford Performance Racing	Ford Falcon (FG)	94	+ 1 lap	4
22	55	(Australia) Paul Dumbrell (Canada) Jacques Villeneuve	Rod Nash Racing	Ford Falcon (FG)	91	+ 1 lap	3
Ret	16	(Australia) Tony Ricciardello (Australia) Dale Wood	Kelly Racing	Holden Commodore (VE)	93	Retired	27
Ret	10	(Australia) Andrew Thompson (Finland) Mika Salo	Walkinshaw Racing	Holden Commodore (VE)	78	Retired	26
Ret	3	(Australia) Tony D'Alberto (Portugal) Tiago Monteiro	Tony D'Alberto Racing	Holden Commodore (VE)	50	Retired	24
Ret	30	(Australia) Nathan Pretty (United States) Scott Pruett	Lucas Dumbrell Motorsport	Holden Commodore (VE)	24	Retired	29
Ret	12	(Australia) Dean Fiore (Italy) Gianni Morbidelli	Triple F Racing	Ford Falcon (FG)	1	Retired	25
Ret	22	(Australia) Will Davison (Australia) Ryan Briscoe	Walkinshaw Racing	Holden Commodore (VE)	0	Accident	10
Ret	6	(New Zealand) Steven Richards (Australia) Will Power	Ford Performance Racing	Ford Falcon (FG)	0	Accident	7
Fastest lap set by Craig Lowndes – 1:13.1879 on Lap 69

== Race 22 ==
Steven Richards outlaunched teammate polesitter Luke Youlden to lead at the start as Greg Ritter crawled away all but stalling. Alain Menu was also slow away and stopped on the track, bringing out the safety car.

At the restart there was contact between Cameron McConville and David Brabham, sending Brabham into the wall hard.

At the second restart Richards started to build a gap over Youlden and Warren Luff. Steve Owen and Michael Caruso quickly pushed past Youlden and Luff.

Safety car emerged again for the stopped car of Andrew Thompson. The safety car emerged again on lap 33 for debris on the circuit as Jack Perkins scraped a door skin off his car at the top of the circuit.

Andrew Jones had an exhaust problem and slowed on the front straight to allow his pitcrew to examine the car as he passed. Three cars came past at differing speeds. Scott Dixon swung to the inside to get around the slowing cars in front as they checked their speed to begin their first safety car lap. Dixon struck the slow moving Jones, tearing the right rear corner from Jones' Commodore and damaging the front left corner of his own Commodore, putting both out of the race.

Steven Johnson was shortly afterward put into the wall after contact with Rick Kelly.

The final laps saw a close dice between Jamie Whincup and Shane van Gisbergen which became a physical clash on the final lap into the first chicane. Whincup held out the charging Van Gisbergen, with Mark Winterbottom crossing for third just behind.

Pos.	No.	Drivers	Team	Car	Laps	Time/Retired	Grid
1	1	(Australia) Jamie Whincup (Australia) Steve Owen	Triple Eight Race Engineering	Holden Commodore (VE)	102	2:29:37.7468	4
2	9	(New Zealand) Shane van Gisbergen (New Zealand) John McIntyre	Stone Brothers Racing	Ford Falcon (FG)	102	+ 0.205	6
3	5	(Australia) Mark Winterbottom (Australia) Luke Youlden	Ford Performance Racing	Ford Falcon (FG)	102	+ 0.486	1
4	18	(Australia) James Courtney (Australia) Warren Luff	Dick Johnson Racing	Ford Falcon (FG)	102	+ 1.636	3
5	55	(Australia) Paul Dumbrell (Canada) Jacques Villeneuve	Rod Nash Racing	Ford Falcon (FG)	102	+ 17.854	8
6	15	(Australia) Rick Kelly (Australia) Owen Kelly	Kelly Racing	Holden Commodore (VE)	102	+ 22.083	10
7	22	(Australia) Will Davison (Australia) Ryan Briscoe	Holden Racing Team	Holden Commodore (VE)	102	+ 23.557	21
8	39	(Australia) Russell Ingall (Australia) Jack Perkins	Paul Morris Motorsport	Holden Commodore (VE)	102	+ 23.821	25
9	33	(Australia) Lee Holdsworth (Australia) Greg Ritter	Garry Rogers Motorsport	Holden Commodore (VE)	102	+ 26.076	7
10	888	(Australia) Craig Lowndes (United Kingdom) Andy Priaulx	Triple Eight Race Engineering	Holden Commodore (VE)	102	+ 30.827	11
11	34	(Australia) Michael Caruso (United States) Patrick Long	Garry Rogers Motorsport	Holden Commodore (VE)	102	+ 32.874	14
12	24	(New Zealand) Fabian Coulthard (Australia) David Reynolds	Walkinshaw Racing	Holden Commodore (VE)	102	+ 35.649	24
13	6	(New Zealand) Steven Richards (Australia) Will Power	Ford Performance Racing	Ford Falcon (FG)	102	+ 36.264	2
14	12	(Australia) Dean Fiore (Italy) Gianni Morbidelli	Triple F Racing	Ford Falcon (FG)	102	+ 1:08.613	27
15	51	(New Zealand) Greg Murphy (France) Yvan Muller	Paul Morris Motorsport	Holden Commodore (VE)	102	+ 1:09.992	13
16	19	(Australia) Jonathon Webb (France) Sébastien Bourdais	Tekno Autosports	Ford Falcon (FG)	102	+ 1:12.591	19
17	3	(Australia) Tony D'Alberto (Portugal) Tiago Monteiro	Tony D'Alberto Racing	Holden Commodore (VE)	102	+ 1:31.532	18
18	16	(Australia) Tony Ricciardello (Australia) Dale Wood	Kelly Racing	Holden Commodore (VE)	101	+ 1 lap	28
19	47	(Australia) Tim Slade (Brazil) Hélio Castroneves	James Rosenberg Racing	Ford Falcon (FG)	96	+ 6 laps	23
20	11	(Australia) Jason Bargwanna (Canada) Alex Tagliani	Kelly Racing	Holden Commodore (VE)	92	+ 10 laps	22
Ret	2	(Australia) Garth Tander (Australia) Cameron McConville	Holden Racing Team	Holden Commodore (VE)	57	Accident damage	15
Ret	17	(Australia) Steven Johnson (United Kingdom) Dario Franchitti	Dick Johnson Racing	Ford Falcon (FG)	38	Retired	12
Ret	21	(Australia) Karl Reindler (Italy) Fabrizio Giovanardi	Britek Motorsport	Holden Commodore (VE)	37	Retired	26
Ret	8	(New Zealand) Jason Richards (Australia) Andrew Jones	Brad Jones Racing	Holden Commodore (VE)	34	Retired	9
Ret	7	(Australia) Todd Kelly (New Zealand) Scott Dixon	Kelly Racing	Holden Commodore (VE)	34	Retired	16
Ret	30	(Australia) Nathan Pretty (United States) Scott Pruett	Lucas Dumbrell Motorsport	Holden Commodore (VE)	28	Retired	29
Ret	10	(Australia) Andrew Thompson (Finland) Mika Salo	Walkinshaw Racing	Holden Commodore (VE)	12	Retired	20
Ret	4	(Australia) Alex Davison (Australia) David Brabham	Stone Brothers Racing	Ford Falcon (FG)	3	Retired	17
Ret	14	(Australia) Jason Bright (Switzerland) Alain Menu	Brad Jones Racing	Holden Commodore (VE)	0	Retired	5
Fastest lap set by James Courtney – 1:13.1332 on Lap 67

== International driver trophy Points ==
Pos	No	Name	Team	Points
1	888	(United Kingdom) Andy Priaulx	Triple Eight Race Engineering	216
2	33	(United States) Patrick Long	Garry Rogers Motorsport	192
3	55	(Canada) Jacques Villeneuve	Rod Nash Racing	150
4	19	(France) Sébastien Bourdais	Tekno Autosports	147
5	51	(France) Yvan Muller	Paul Morris Motorsport	126

== Standings ==
- After 20 of 26 races.

Pos	No	Name	Team	Points
1	18	James Courtney	Dick Johnson Racing	2521
2	1	Jamie Whincup	Triple Eight Race Engineering	2450
3	888	Craig Lowndes	Triple Eight Race Engineering	2255
4	5	Mark Winterbottom	Ford Performance Racing	2201
5	2	Garth Tander	Holden Racing Team	2088
