= 2026 Australian Formula Open =

Australian formula racing championship

The 2026 Australian Formula Open: Driven by FRCA was a multi-event open-wheel single seater motor racing championship. This was the fourth season of the Australian Formula Open series, which was originally founded by two-time Australian Gold Star winner Tim Macrow in 2023 as a direct successor to the Australian Formula 3 championship. The AFO moniker was then taken over by the organizers of the NSW Formula Car Championship, an open formula championship run since 2011 as one of Motorsport Australia's State Championships, in 2025.

The championship was run over five weekends from March to October. Alex Macdonald, driving for his own Macdonald Air & Electrical team, won the championship title with three races to spare.

== Teams and drivers ==
All teams and drivers are Australian-registered.

Entrant	No.	Driver	Vehicle	Engine	Rounds
Roberts Racing	2	Andrew Roberts	Dallara F307		1
GKR F3	2	George Kantzios	Dallara F304	Spiess Opel 2.0 L I4	2, 4–5
RMS Racing	3	Robert Sviderskas	Mantis M2001		1
Privateer	7	Troy Beros	Reynard 95D	Holden 3.8L V6	4
Waltech Motorsport	9	Jamie Su	Tatuus F4-T421		5
Gilmour Racing	17	Chris Gilmour	Dallara F307	HWA Mercedes-Benz 2.0 L I4	4
Gilmour Racing	34	Kyle Evans	Dallara F308/11	HWA Mercedes-Benz 2.0 L I4	4
CO Machining	21	Graeme Holmes	Dallara F3		1–3, 5
Baker Motorsport	22	Rodney Baker	Dallara F304	Spiess Opel 2.0 L I4	1–3, 5
AGI Sport	23	Lawrence Katsidis	Mygale M14-F4	Ford 1.6 L I4 turbo	All
AGI Sport	47	Xavier Babbage-Hockey	Tatuus F4-T421	Fiat 1.4 L I4 turbo	1
AGI Sport	66	Lewis Gotch	Tatuus F4-T421	Fiat 1.4 L I4 turbo	1
Apollo Patios	24	Nathan Beer	Dallara F3		2–3
CPL	37	Ben Turner	Dallara F3		1
Formula Race Car Association	41	Greg Muddle	Dallara F305		1–2, 4
Performer Australia	42	Michael Doherty	Performer 1000	Suzuki 1.0L I4	1–2
Performer Australia	72	Shane Varley	Performer 1000	Suzuki 1.0L I4	1–2
Douglas Barry Specials	44	Douglas Barry	Reynard 92D	Holden 3.8L V6	2, 4–5
ARB Bundaberg	51	Ron Bennet	Dallara F399/01	Spiess Opel 2.0 L I4	All
Eagle Transportation	55	Glenn Lynch	Dallara F3		5
Greg Fahey Motorsport	71	Phillip Kay	Dallara F306	Spiess Opel 2.0 L I4	4
Privateer	73	Simon Bedford	Dallara F3	Spiess Opel 2.0 L I4	All
SMJ Plastering	95	Shayne Morrow	Dallara F3	Spiess Opel 2.0 L I4	All
Macdonald Air & Electrical	96	Alex Macdonald	Dallara F304	Spiess Opel 2.0 L I4	1–4
Tim Macrow Racing	125	Anton Du	Mygale M14-F4	Ford 1.6 L I4 turbo	1
McClintock Motorsport	195	Aaron McClintock	Richards 201B	Volkswagen 1.6 L I4	3
Raven Gruppe	666	Adam Savic	Stohr F1000		All
Freakadelli Racing	969	Mike Fischer	Performer 1000	Suzuki 1.0L I4	2

== Race calendar ==
The 2026 calendar was revealed in November of 2025. The series will not return to Winton Motor Raceway, instead holding an event at Queensland Raceway.

Round		Circuit	Date	Support bill	Map of circuit locations
1	R1	(New South Wales) Sydney Motorsport Park, Eastern Creek	14 March	NSW Production Touring Cars; NSW Sports Sedan State Championship; New South Wales Supersports Championship; New South Wales Formula Ford Championship	2026 Australian Formula Open is located in Australia
1	R2	(New South Wales) Sydney Motorsport Park, Eastern Creek	15 March	NSW Production Touring Cars; NSW Sports Sedan State Championship; New South Wales Supersports Championship; New South Wales Formula Ford Championship	2026 Australian Formula Open is located in Australia
1	R3	(New South Wales) Sydney Motorsport Park, Eastern Creek	15 March	NSW Production Touring Cars; NSW Sports Sedan State Championship; New South Wales Supersports Championship; New South Wales Formula Ford Championship	2026 Australian Formula Open is located in Australia
2	R1	(New South Wales) Sydney Motorsport Park, Eastern Creek	30 May	Australian Production Car Endurance Series; AU4 Championship; RX8 Cup Australia	2026 Australian Formula Open is located in Australia
2	R2	(New South Wales) Sydney Motorsport Park, Eastern Creek	31 May	Australian Production Car Endurance Series; AU4 Championship; RX8 Cup Australia	2026 Australian Formula Open is located in Australia
2	R3	(New South Wales) Sydney Motorsport Park, Eastern Creek	31 May	Australian Production Car Endurance Series; AU4 Championship; RX8 Cup Australia	2026 Australian Formula Open is located in Australia
3	R1	(New South Wales) One Raceway, Goulburn	25 July	NSW Production Touring Cars; New South Wales Formula Ford Championship	2026 Australian Formula Open is located in Australia
3	R2	(New South Wales) One Raceway, Goulburn	26 July	NSW Production Touring Cars; New South Wales Formula Ford Championship	2026 Australian Formula Open is located in Australia
3	R3	(New South Wales) One Raceway, Goulburn	26 July	NSW Production Touring Cars; New South Wales Formula Ford Championship	2026 Australian Formula Open is located in Australia
4	R1	Queensland Raceway, Willowbank	19 September	Australian Production Car Endurance Series; Queensland Production Sports Car Championship; SuperMini Challenge Queensland	2026 Australian Formula Open is located in Australia
4	R2	Queensland Raceway, Willowbank	20 September	Australian Production Car Endurance Series; Queensland Production Sports Car Championship; SuperMini Challenge Queensland	2026 Australian Formula Open is located in Australia
4	R3	Queensland Raceway, Willowbank	20 September	Australian Production Car Endurance Series; Queensland Production Sports Car Championship; SuperMini Challenge Queensland	2026 Australian Formula Open is located in Australia
5	R1	(New South Wales) One Raceway, Goulburn	24 October	NSW Production Touring Cars; RX8 Cup Australia	2026 Australian Formula Open is located in Australia
5	R2	(New South Wales) One Raceway, Goulburn	25 October	NSW Production Touring Cars; RX8 Cup Australia	2026 Australian Formula Open is located in Australia
5	R3	(New South Wales) One Raceway, Goulburn	25 October	NSW Production Touring Cars; RX8 Cup Australia	2026 Australian Formula Open is located in Australia

== Race results ==
Round		Circuit	Pole position	Fastest lap	Winning driver	Winning team
1	R1	(New South Wales) Sydney Motorsport Park	Alex Macdonald	Alex Macdonald	Alex Macdonald	Macdonald Air & Electrical
1	R2	(New South Wales) Sydney Motorsport Park		Alex Macdonald	Andrew Roberts	Roberts Racing
1	R3	(New South Wales) Sydney Motorsport Park		Ben Turner	Ben Turner	CPL
2	R1	(New South Wales) Sydney Motorsport Park	Graeme Holmes	George Kantzios	Michael Doherty	Performer Australia
2	R2	(New South Wales) Sydney Motorsport Park		race abandonded after multiple stalled cars at starts		
2	R3	(New South Wales) Sydney Motorsport Park		George Kantzios	George Kantzios	GKR F3
3	R1	(New South Wales) One Raceway	Alex Macdonald	Rodney Baker	Alex Macdonald	Macdonald Air & Electrical
3	R2	(New South Wales) One Raceway		Alex Macdonald	Alex Macdonald	Macdonald Air & Electrical
3	R3	(New South Wales) One Raceway		Rodney Baker	Alex Macdonald	Macdonald Air & Electrical
4	R1	Queensland Raceway	Kyle Evans	Kyle Evans	Kyle Evans	Gilmour Racing
4	R2	Queensland Raceway		Chris Gilmour	Chris Gilmour	Gilmour Racing
4	R3	Queensland Raceway		Chris Gilmour	Chris Gilmour	Gilmour Racing
5	R1	(New South Wales) One Raceway	George Kantzios	George Kantzios	George Kantzios	GKR F3
5	R2	(New South Wales) One Raceway		Jamie Su	Rodney Baker	Baker Motorsport
5	R3	(New South Wales) One Raceway		Jamie Su	Rodney Baker	Baker Motorsport

== Championship standings ==
Points are awarded as follows:

Position	1st	2nd	3rd	4th	5th	6th	7th	8th	9th	10th
Points	25	18	15	12	10	8	6	4	2	1

Pos	Driver	SYD1 (New South Wales)			SYD2 (New South Wales)			ONE1 (New South Wales)			QLD (Queensland)			ONE2 (New South Wales)			Pts
Pos	Driver	R1	R2	R3	R1	R2	R3	R1	R2	R3	R1	R2	R3	R1	R2	R3	Pts
1	Alex Macdonald	**1**	3	DNS	2	C	2	**1**	1	1	3	4	3				193
2	Ron Bennet	6	7	4	4	C	Ret	3	2	2	5	6	5	5	3	4	154
3	Rodney Baker	3	DNS	3	3	C	Ret	2	3	Ret				2	1	1	146
4	Douglas Barry				5	C	DNS				4	5	4	3	2	3	92
5	Shayne Morrow	Ret	12	7	11	C	6	6	5	3	7	9	Ret	7	7	6	75
6	Simon Bedford	12	10	10	9	C	5	9	6	5	6	Ret	7	6	5	7	71
7	Chris Gilmour										2	1	1				68
8	George Kantzios				10	C	1				9	3	Ret	**1**	DNS	DNS	68
9	Michael Doherty	4	5	Ret	1	C	3										62
10	Ben Turner	2	2	1													61
11	Kyle Evans										**1**	2	2				61
12	Adam Savic	11	8	DNS	8	C	Ret	7	4	4	Ret	8	6	10	6	9	61
13	Lawrence Katsidis	13	9	Ret	6	C	7	5	Ret	DNS	WD	WD	WD	4	4	Ret	50
14	Andrew Roberts	8	1	2													47
15	Graeme Holmes	5	Ret	5	**Ret**	C	DNS	8	DNS	DNS				Ret	Ret	5	34
16	Nathan Beer				7	C	DNS	10	7	6							21
17	Jamie Su													9	Ret	2	18
18	Shane Varley	7	NC	DNS	Ret	C	4										18
19	Lewis Gotch	10	6	8													13
20	Greg Muddle	DNS	4	Ret	WD	WD	WD				WD	WD	WD				12
21	Aaron McClintock							4	Ret	DNS							12
22	Xavier Babbage-Hockey	9	13	6													11
23	Phillip Kay										8	7	Ret				10
24	Glenn Lynch													8	Ret	8	8
25	Anton Du	Ret	11	9													2
—	Mike Fischer				Ret	C	DNS										0
—	Robert Sviderskas	DNS	DNS	DNS													0
—	Troy Beros										DNS	DNS	DNS				0
Pos	Driver	R1	R2	R3	R1	R2	R3	R1	R2	R3	R1	R2	R3	R1	R2	R3	Pts
Pos	Driver	SYD1 (New South Wales)			SYD2 (New South Wales)			ONE1 (New South Wales)			QLD (Queensland)			ONE2 (New South Wales)			Pts

Colour	Result
Gold	Winner
Silver	Second place
Bronze	Third place
Green	Points classification
Blue	Non-points classification
Blue	Non-classified finish (NC)
Purple	Retired, not classified (Ret)
Red	Did not qualify (DNQ)
Red	Did not pre-qualify (DNPQ)
Black	Disqualified (DSQ)
White	Did not start (DNS)
White	Withdrew (WD)
White	Race cancelled (C)
Blank	Did not practice (DNP)
Blank	Did not arrive (DNA)
Blank	Excluded (EX)

**Bold** – Pole

Italics – Fastest Lap

† — Did not finish, but classified
