= 2003 Australian Nations Cup Championship =

The 2003 Australian Nations Cup Championship was a CAMS sanctioned motor racing title for drivers of GT sports cars complying with Group 2E Nations Cup regulations. The championship, which was managed by Procar Australia as part of the 2003 Procar Championship Series, was the fourth Australian Nations Cup Championship. The title was won by Paul Stokell driving a Lamborghini Diablo GTR.

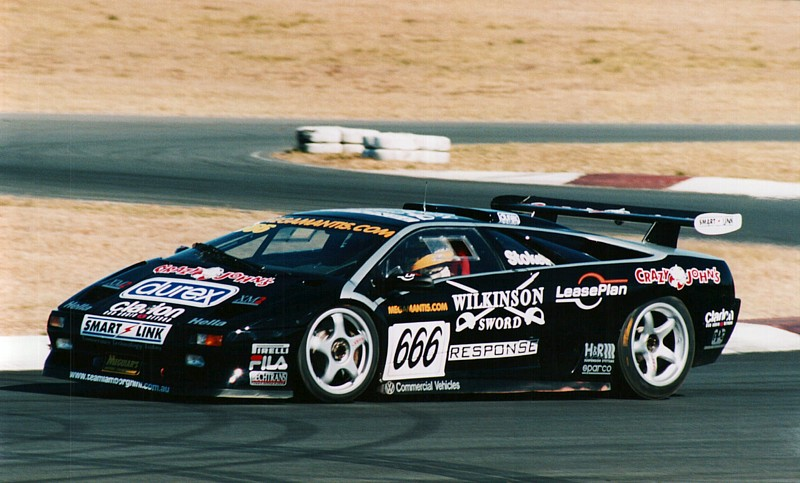
Paul Stokell won the title driving a Lamborghini Diablo (pictured above in 2001)

== Calendar ==
The championship was contested over an eight-round series with three races per round.

Round	Circuit	State	Date	Race Winners	Round winner	Car	Report
1	Adelaide Street Circuit	South Australia	22–23 March	R1 - John Bowe; R2 - John Bowe; R3 - Paul Stokell	John Bowe	Ferrari 360 N-GT	
2	Symmons Plains	Tasmania	26–27 April	R1 - John Bowe; R2 - Nathan Pretty; R3 - Paul Stokell	Nathan Pretty	Holden Monaro 427C	
3	Wakefield Park	New South Wales	31 May - 1 June	R1 - John Bowe; R2 - John Bowe; R3 - John Bowe	John Bowe	Ferrari 360 N-GT	
4	Queensland Raceway	Queensland	14–15 June	R1 - Paul Stokell; R2 - Nathan Pretty; R3 - Paul Stokell	Paul Stokell	Lamborghini Diablo GTR	
5	Oran Park	New South Wales	12–13 July	R1 - Paul Stokell; R2 - Paul Stokell; R3 - Paul Stokell	Paul Stokell	Lamborghini Diablo GTR	
6	Phillip Island	Victoria	9–10 August	R1 - Paul Stokell; R2 - Nathan Pretty; R3 - Paul Stokell	Paul Stokell	Lamborghini Diablo GTR	
7	Winton Motor Raceway	Victoria	20–21 September	R1 - John Bowe; R2 - Paul Stokell; R3 - Nathan Pretty	Nathan Pretty	Holden Monaro 427C	
8	Surfers Paradise Street Circuit	Queensland	23–26 October	R1 - Peter Brock; R2 - Paul Stokell; R3 - **	Paul Stokell	Lamborghini Diablo GTR	

Note: ** Race 3 at the Surfers Paradise round was cancelled due to a security issue.

== Points system ==
Championship points were awarded on a 30-20-16-13-11-10-9-8-7-6-5-4-3-2-1 basis to the first 15 finishers in each race. In addition, three points were awarded to the driver earning pole position.

== Results ==
Position	Driver	No.	Car	Entrant	Points
1	Paul Stokell	27	Lamborghini Diablo GTR	Crazy John's	539
2	John Bowe	888	Ferrari 360 N-GT; Dodge Viper ACR; Porsche 911 GT3 RS	Verve 501	493
3	Nathan Pretty	427	Holden Monaro 427C	Garry Rogers Motorsport	374
4	Peter Brock	05	Holden Monaro 427C	Garry Rogers Motorsport	265
5	James Koundouris	33; 99	Porsche 911 GT3 Clubsport; Ferrari 360 Modena Challenge	Supabarn Emporium; Mark Coffey Racing	156
6	Greg Crick	2	Dodge Viper ACR	Geoff Morgan	148
7	Sam Newman	17	Lamborghini Diablo GTR; Lamborghini Diablo SVR	Crazy John's	144
8	Allan Simonsen	88	Ferrari 360 Modena Challenge	Mark Coffey Racing	129
9	Martin Wagg	67	Porsche 911 GT3 RS	JMC Group	127
10	Anthony Tratt	75	Lamborghini Diablo GTR	Toll / IPEC	92
11	Gary Young	8	Maserati Trofeo; Porsche 911 GT3 Clubsport	Trident Racing; Martin Wagg	61
12	Mark Eddy	30	Porsche 911 GT3	Hot Sand Surfwear	51
13	Paul Blackie	24	Porsche 911 GT3 Clubsport	Pro-Floor	49
14	Rod Wilson	28; 11	Maserati Trofeo; Ford Mustang Cobra R	Trident Racing & Pirelli	41
15	Jim Richards	1	Porsche 911 GT3	OAMPS Insurance	40
16	John Teulan	54	Ferrari 360 Modena Challenge	Industrie Central	36
17	D'arcy Russell	7	Dodge Viper ACR	D'arcy Russell Racing	35
18	Wayne Hennig	55	Porsche 911 GT3 Clubsport	Wayne Hennig	34
18	VJ Angelo	4	BMW Z3 GT	VJ Angelo	34
20	Peter Hackett	37	Lamborghini Diablo GTR	Cactus	32
21	Simon Bartter	70	Porsche 911 GT3 Clubsport	Red Rooster	31
22	Tony Quinn	32	Porsche 911 GT3 Carrera	VIP Petfoods	28
23	Rusty French	6	Porsche 911 GT3	Skye Sands	26
24	David Stevens	66	Porsche 911 GT3 Clubsport	Securetel	25
25	Jonathon Webb	22	Porsche 911 GT3 Carrera	Tekno Autosports	23
26	Neil Bryson	25	Porsche 911 GT3 Clubsport	CGA Bryson	22
27	Wayne Park	58	Porsche 911 GT3 Clubsport	Property Solutions Group	20
28	Kevin Miller	58	Porsche 911 GT3 Clubsport	Property Solutions Group	17
29	Dean Koutsoumidis	71	Porsche 911 GT3 Clubsport	Equity-one Finance & Investments	16
30	Murray Carter	18	Chevrolet Corvette C5	Murray Carter	15
31	Klaus Engelhorn	48	Ferrari 360 N-GT	BE Racing	14
32	Stuart Kostera	48	Porsche 911 GT3 Clubsport	Dunlop Super Dealers	13
32	Theo Koundouris	33	Porsche 911 GT3 Clubsport	Supabarn Emporium	13
34	Kim Burke	68	Porsche 911 GT3 Clubsport	JK Burke	12
35	David Lawson	28	Maserati Trofeo	Trident Racing	11
36	Andrew Miedecke	36	Porsche 911 GT3 Cup	Whiteline Transport	8
37	Andrew Taplin	16	Porsche 911 GT3	Andrew Taplin	7
38	Maher Algadri	70	Porsche 911 GT3 Clubsport	Verve 501	6
39	Russell Wright	50	Porsche 911 GT3 Clubsport	Kingfisher Luxury Boats	1
Group 1
1	Paul Stokell	27	Lamborghini Diablo GTR	Crazy John's	540
2	John Bowe	888	Ferrari 360 N-GT; Dodge Viper ACR; Porsche 911 GT3 RS	Verve 501	494
3	Nathan Pretty	427	Holden Monaro 427C	Garry Rogers Motorsport	375
4	Peter Brock	05	Holden Monaro 427C	Garry Rogers Motorsport	265
5	Greg Crick	2	Dodge Viper ACR	Geoff Morgan	148
6	Martin Wagg	67	Porsche 911 GT3 RS	JMC Group	140
7	Anthony Tratt	75	Lamborghini Diablo GTR	Toll / IPEC	95
8	Mark Eddy	30	Porsche 911 GT3	Hot Sand Surfwear	77
9	Sam Newman	17	Lamborghini Diablo GTR	Crazy John's	60
10	Jim Richards	1	Porsche 911 GT3	OAMPS Insurance	40
11	D'arcy Russell	7	Dodge Viper ACR	D'arcy Russell Racing	38
12	Peter Hackett	37	Lamborghini Diablo GTR	Cactus	32
13	Klaus Engelhorn	48	Ferrari 360 N-GT	BE Racing	19
Group 2
1	James Koundouris	33; 99	Porsche 911 GT3 Clubsport; Ferrari 360 Modena Challenge	Supabarn Emporium; Mark Coffey Racing	410
2	Allan Simonsen	88	Ferrari 360 Modena Challenge	Mark Coffey Racing	342
3	Sam Newman	17	Lamborghini Diablo SVR	Crazy John's	218
4	Gary Young	8	Maserati Trofeo; Porsche 911 GT3 Clubsport	Trident Racing; Martin Wagg	130
5	Paul Blackie	24	Porsche 911 GT3 Clubsport	Pro-Floor	101
6	Rod Wilson	28; 11	Maserati Trofeo; Ford Mustang Cobra R	Trident Racing; Pirelli	96
7	VJ Angelo	4	BMW Z3 GT	VJ Angelo	94
8	Tony Quinn	32	Porsche 911 GT3 Carrera	VIP Petfoods	93
9	Rusty French	6	Porsche 911 GT3	Skye Sands	83
10	John Teulan	54	Ferrari 360 Modena Challenge	Industrie Central	75
10	Wayne Hennig	55	Porsche 911 GT3 Clubsport	Wayne Hennig	75
12	Simon Bartter	70	Porsche 911 GT3 Clubsport	Red Rooster	71
13	Neil Bryson	25	Porsche 911 GT3 Clubsport	CGA Bryson	57
14	David Stevens	66	Porsche 911 GT3 Clubsport	Securetel	56
15	Dean Koutsoumidis	71	Porsche 911 GT3 Clubsport	Equity-one Finance & Investments	53
16	Jonathon Webb	22	Porsche 911 GT3 Carrera	Tekno Autosports	52
17	Kevin Miller	58	Porsche 911 GT3 Clubsport	Property Solutions Group	48
18	Murray Carter	18	Chevrolet Corvette C5	Murray Carter	41
19	Wayne Park	58	Porsche 911 GT3 Clubsport	Property Solutions Group	36
20	Kim Burke	68	Porsche 911 GT3 Clubsport	JK Burke	32
21	David Lawson	28	Maserati Trofeo	Trident Racing	30
22	Stuart Kostera	48	Porsche 911 GT3 Clubsport	Dunlop Super Dealers	29
22	Theo Koundouris	33	Porsche 911 GT3 Clubsport	Supabarn Emporium	29
24	Andrew Miedecke	36	Porsche 911 GT3 Cup	Whiteline Transport	20
25	Maher Algadri	70	Porsche 911 GT3 Clubsport	Verve 501	18
26	Andrew Taplin	16	Porsche 911 GT3	Andrew Taplin	16
27	Russell Wright	50	Porsche 911 GT3 Clubsport	Kingfisher Luxury Boats	6

== Manufacturers Trophy ==
The Manufacturers Trophy was awarded to the manufacturer which attained the highest number of cumulative points over all rounds, inclusive of pole position points. Points were awarded as per the drivers championship to the two highest scoring finishers from each marque in each race.

Position	Manufacturer	Car(s)	Points
1	(Germany) Porsche	911 GT3; 911 GT3 RS; 911 GT3 Cup; 911 GT3 Carrera; 911 GT3 Clubsport	1,221
2	(Italy) Lamborghini	Diablo GTR; Diablo SVR	945
3	(Italy) Ferrari	360 N-GT; 360 Modena Challenge	901
4	(Australia) Holden	Monaro 427C	639
5	(United States) Dodge	Viper ACR	248
6	(Italy) Maserati	Trofeo	201
7	(Germany) BMW	Z3 GT	94
8	(United States) Chevrolet	Corvette C5	41
9	(United States) Ford	Mustang Cobra R	25
