= Nathan Pretty =

Australian racing driver

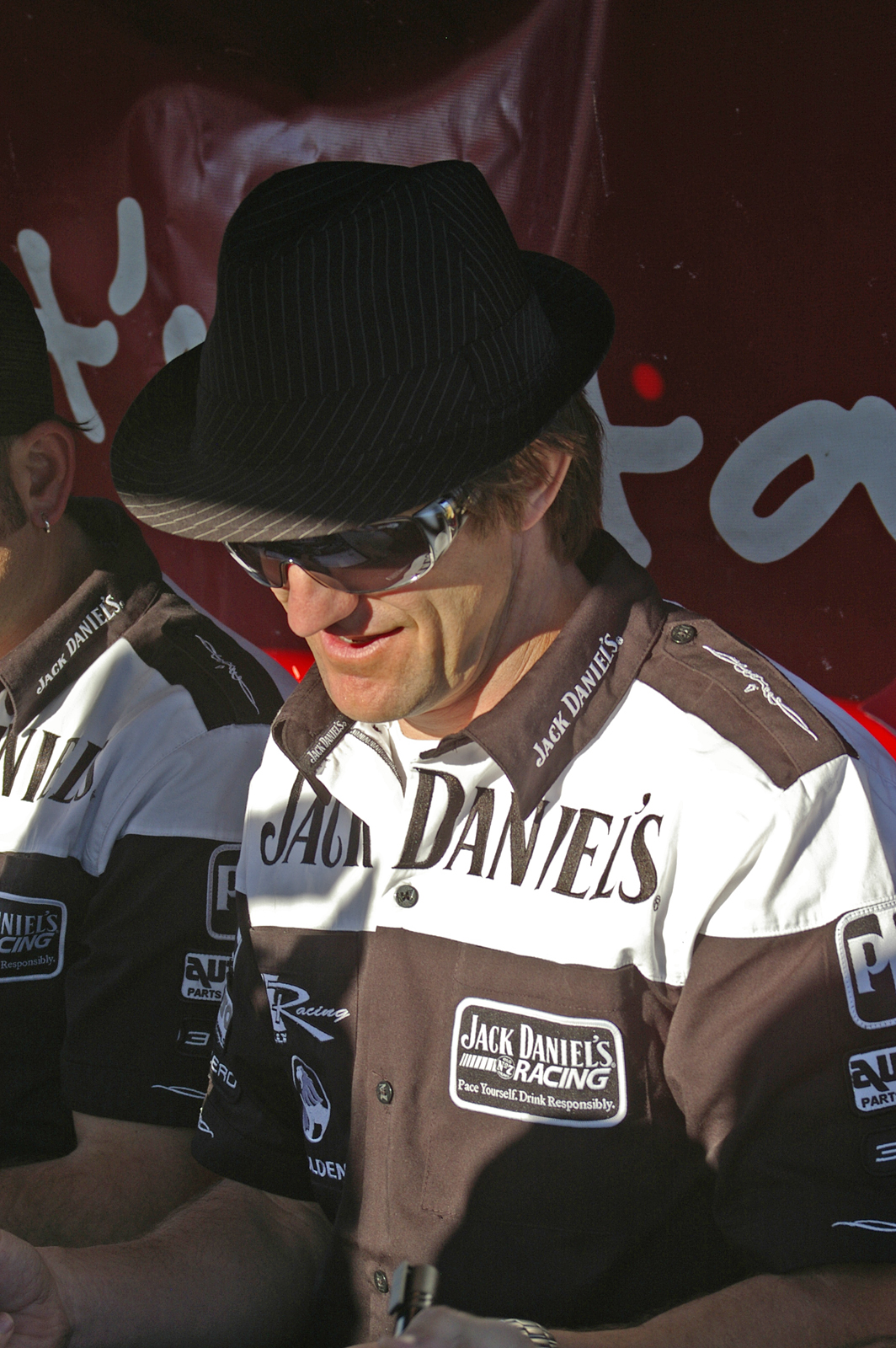
- Pretty in 2009
- Nationality: Australian
- Born: 7 July 1973 (age 53) Albury, New South Wales
- Relatives: Nicole Pretty (sister)

V8 Utes career
- Debut season: 2011
- Car number: 56
- Starts: 39
- Wins: 2
- Fastest laps: 2
- Best finish: 6th in 2011

Previous series
- 1998–2011 1999 2003–2004 2006 2015: AUSCAR; V8 Supercar; Future Touring; Nations Cup; Development V8 Supercar; Stadium Super Trucks

Championship titles
- 2002: Bathurst 24 Hour

Nathan Pretty (born 7 July 1973) is an Australian racecar driver.

== Career ==
Pretty first rose to prominence racing AUSCAR Superspeedway sedans (a Holden Commodore), becoming rookie of the year in his initial season in 1994. His family based race team built a V8 Supercar Commodore in 1998 racing with his sister Nicole at the 1998 FAI 1000. After racing as a privateer Pretty increasing gained more prestigious drives with other V8 Supercar teams and was a favourite of the factory supported teams, Holden Racing Team and K-mart Racing Team.

Pretty was part of the Garry Rogers Motorsport team that won the 2002 Bathurst 24 Hour driving alongside regular GRM driver Garth Tander, Steven Richards and Cameron McConville driving the controversial #427, 7.0 litre Holden Monaro 427C. Out of that win Pretty gained a full-time drive in 2003 in the 24 Hour winning Monaro in the Australian Nations Cup Championship. Pretty finished third in the 2003 Australian Nations Cup Championship which included round wins at Symmons Plains Raceway in Tasmania and a surprise win at the tight Winton Motor Raceway in rural Victoria. In the 2003 championship he was joined as a teammate by legendary racer Peter Brock who was making a full-time comeback to racing after having initially retired at the end of 1997. Following the championship, Pretty and his 2002 co-drivers went on to finish second in the 2003 Bathurst 24 Hour race, finishing less than a second behind their teammates Brock, Greg Murphy, Jason Bright and Todd Kelly in the second team Monaro.

Brock formed his own team to run Monaro's for himself and his son James in the 2004 Australian Nations Cup Championship while Pretty remained with Garry Rogers, running the original Bathurst 24 Hour Monaro. Pretty would finish the 2004 championship as runner up to the V12 Lamborghini Diablo GTR of defending series champion Paul Stokell. Along the way Pretty would set the class lap record at the Sandown Raceway. This would be the final year of the Nations Cup Championship as series owner Ross Palmer would be forced to close Procar Australia. This also forced the cancellation of the Bathurst 24 Hour race.

After spending 2005 largely on the sidelines, Pretty raced for Robert Smith's team in the 2006 Fujitsu V8 Supercar Series. Kelly spent three years at Perkins Engineering racing at Bathurst and racing the teams Commodore station wagon at the Bathurst 12 Hour. Pretty returned to full-time racing in 2011 in the V8 Utes series where he has been instantly competitive. In 2015, he raced in the Stadium Super Trucks at the Adelaide 500.

Pretty occasionally goes by the non-de-plume of Randy Corners where he parodies motor racing culture and racing drivers.

== Career results ==
Results sourced from Driver Database.

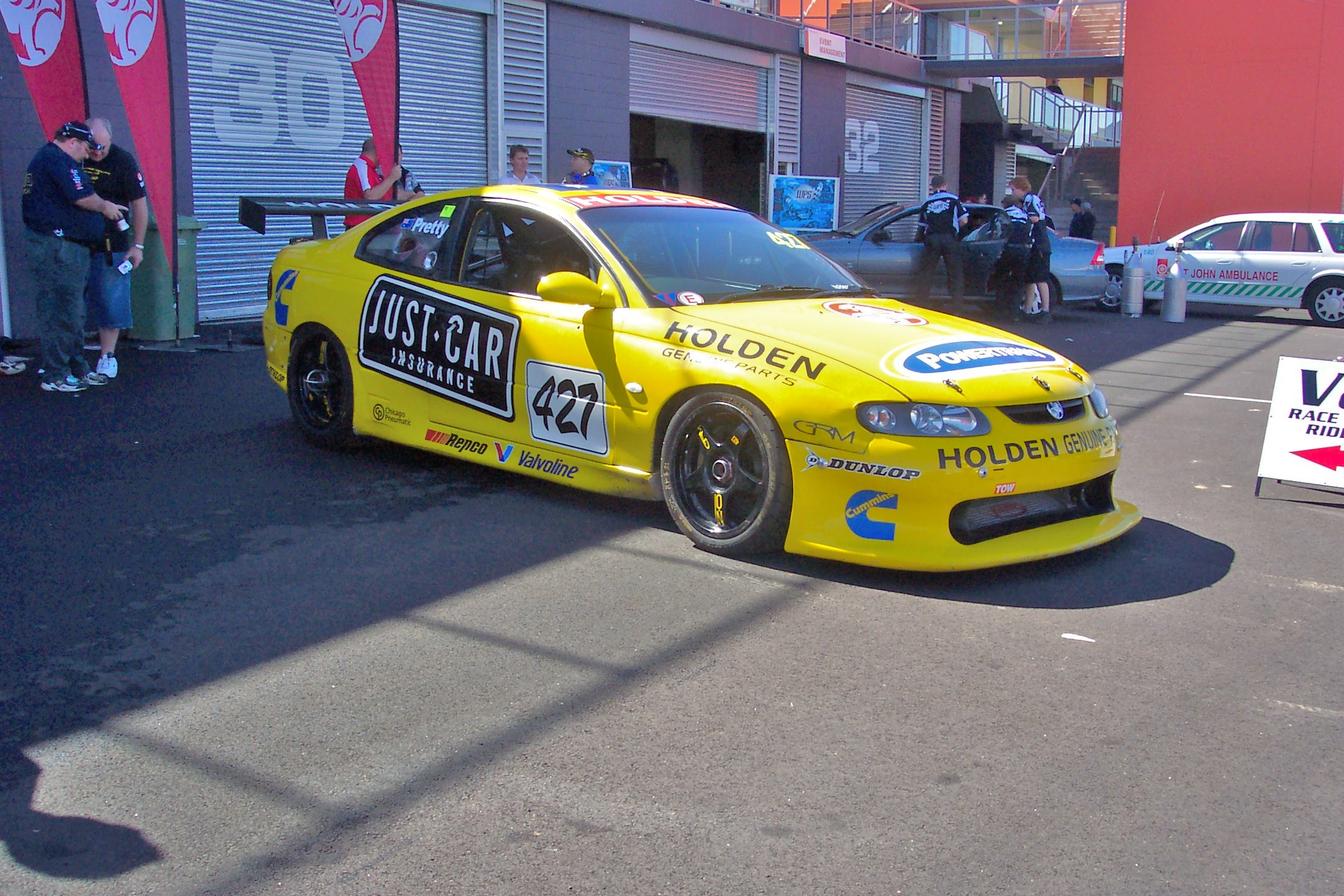
The Garry Rogers Motorsport built Holden Monaro 427C in the livery used in 2004 Australian Nations Cup Championship

Season	Series	Position	Car	Team
1997/98	AUSCAR	NA	Holden VR Commodore	Pretty Motorsport
1999	Hot Wheels V8 Supercar Showdown	22nd	Holden VR Commodore	Pretty Motorsport
1999	V8 Supercars	59th	Holden VS Commodore	Pretty Motorsport
2000	V8 Supercars	29th	Holden VT Commodore	Holden Racing Team
2001	V8 Brute Muster	16th	Holden SS Ute	
2001	V8 Supercars	51st	Holden VX Commodore	K-mart Racing Team
2002	V8 Supercars	39th	Holden VX Commodore	Holden Racing Team
2003	Australian Nations Cup Championship	3rd	Holden Monaro 427C	Garry Rogers Motorsport
2003	V8 Supercars	56th	Holden VX Commodore; Holden VY Commodore	Garry Rogers Motorsport
2004	Australian Nations Cup Championship	2nd	Holden Monaro 427C	Garry Rogers Motorsport
2004	V8 Supercars	51st	Holden VY Commodore	Garry Rogers Motorsport
2005	V8 Supercars	41st	Holden VZ Commodore	Paul Weel Racing
2006	Fujitsu V8 Supercar Series	5th	Holden VY Commodore	Smiths Trucks Racing
2006	V8 Supercars	40th	Holden VZ Commodore	Paul Weel Racing
2007	V8 Supercars	32nd	Holden VE Commodore	Holden Racing Team
2008	V8 Supercars	35th	Holden VE Commodore	Perkins Engineering
2009	V8 Supercars	49th	Holden VE Commodore	Kelly Racing
2010	V8 Utes	37th	Holden VE SS Ute	Samboy Racing Team
2010	V8 Supercars	51st	Holden VE Commodore	Lucas Dumbrell Motorsport
2011	V8 Supercars	55th	Holden VE Commodore	Lucas Dumbrell Motorsport
2012	V8 Utes	3rd	Holden VE SS Ute	Monster Energy
2013	V8 Utes	2nd	Holden VE SS Ute	Milwaukee Racing
2014	V8 Utes	6th	Holden VE SS Ute	Murphy Motorsport
2015	Stadium Super Trucks	17th	Stadium Super Truck	
2015	V8 Utes	9th	Holden VE SS Ute	Murphy Automotive

=== Complete Australian Nations Cup results ===
Year	Team	Car	1	2	3	4	5	6	7	8	Final pos	Points
2003	Garry Rogers Motorsport	Holden Monaro 427C	ADL; 4	SYM; 1	WAK; 3	QLD; 2	ORA; 3	PHI; 2	WIN; 1	SUR; 5	3rd	374
2004	Garry Rogers Motorsport	Holden Monaro 427C	ADL; 3	ORA; 1	SAN; 2	WIN; 1	ECK; 2	WAK; 2	MAL		2nd	415

=== Bathurst 1000 ===
Year	Car#	Team	Car	Co-driver	Position	Laps
1998	60	Pretty Motorsport	Holden VS Commodore	(Australia) Nicole Pretty (Australia) Grant Johnson	DNF	85
1999	60	Pretty Motorsport	Holden VS Commodore	(New Zealand) Andrew Fawcet	21st	134
2000	15	Holden Racing Team	Holden VT Commodore	(Australia) Todd Kelly	5th	161
2001	51	K-Mart Racing Team	Holden VX Commodore	(Australia) Rick Kelly	14th	158
2002	02	Holden Young Lions	Holden VX Commodore	(Australia) Rick Kelly	4th	161
2003	33	Garry Rogers Motorsport	Holden VX Commodore	(Denmark) Allan Simonsen	DNF	42
2004	33	Garry Rogers Motorsport	Holden VY Commodore	(Denmark) Allan Simonsen	10th	160
2005	50	Paul Weel Racing	Holden VZ Commodore	(Australia) Owen Kelly	6th	161
2006	50	Paul Weel Racing	Holden VZ Commodore	(Australia) Paul Weel	8th	161
2007	22	Holden Racing Team	Holden VE Commodore	(Australia) Glenn Seton	11th	161
2008	11	Perkins Engineering	Holden VE Commodore	(Australia) Jack Perkins	8th	161
2009	15	Kelly Racing	Holden VE Commodore	(United Kingdom) Ben Collins	20th	156
2010	30	Lucas Dumbrell Motorsport	Holden VE Commodore	(Australia) Mark Noske	17th	161
2011	30	Lucas Dumbrell Motorsport	Holden VE Commodore	(Australia) Warren Luff	15th	161

=== Bathurst 24 Hour ===
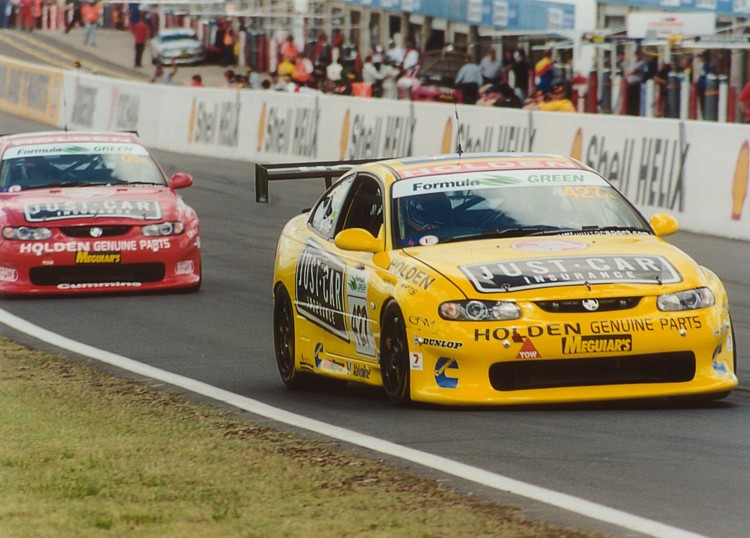
Nathan Pretty driving the #427 Holden Monaro 427C leading teammate Peter Brock early in the 2003 Bathurst 24 Hour race

Year	Team	Co-drivers	Car	Class	Laps	Pos.	Class pos.
2002	(Australia) Garry Rogers Motorsport	(Australia) Garth Tander (New Zealand) Steven Richards (Australia) Cameron McConville	Holden Monaro 427C	1	532	1st	1st
2003	(Australia) Garry Rogers Motorsport	(Australia) Garth Tander (New Zealand) Steven Richards (Australia) Cameron McConville	Holden Monaro 427C	A	527	2nd	2nd

=== Stadium Super Trucks ===
(key) (Bold – Pole position. Italics – Fastest qualifier. * – Most laps led.)

Stadium Super Trucks results
Year	1	2	3	4	5	6	7	8	9	10	11	12	13	14	15	16	17	18	19	20	21	22	SSTC	Pts	Ref
2015	**ADE**; 9	ADE; 5	ADE; 6	STP	STP	LBH	DET	DET	DET	AUS	TOR	TOR	OCF	OCF	OCF	SRF	SRF	SRF	SRF	SYD	LVV	LVV	17th	43	
