= One Raceway =

Motor racing circuit in Goulburn, New South Wales

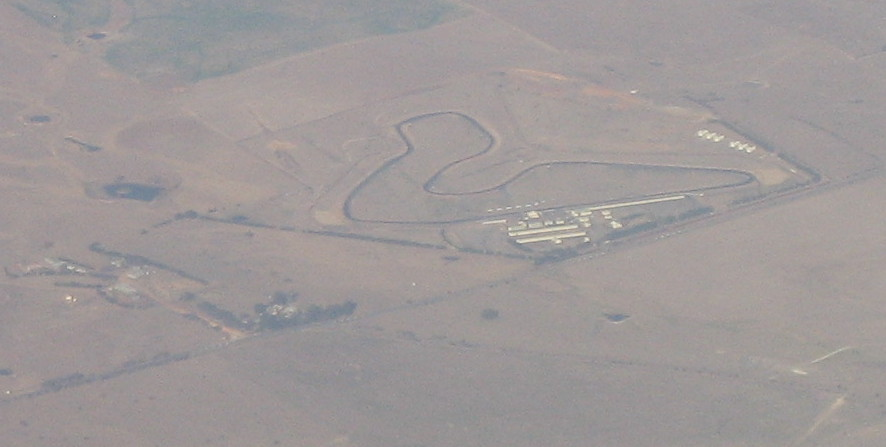
- Aerial view of original circuit from a flight from Canberra to Sydney
- Location: Goulburn, New South Wales
- Coordinates: 34°50′26″S 149°41′7″E
- Owner: Steve Shelley (June 2023–present); Benalla Auto Club (May 1994–May 2023)
- Broke ground: October 1993; 33 years ago
- Opened: 8 May 1994; 32 years ago Re-opened: 8 May 2024; 2 years ago
- Closed: August 2022; 4 years ago
- Former names: Wakefield Park Raceway (1994–2022)
- Major events: Current: ASBK (2004, 2016–2022, 2024–present); Australian Formula Ford (2002, 2004, 2008, 2014–2019, 2021, 2026); TCR Australia (2026); Former: Australian Drivers' Championship (2003, 2005–2006, 2009–2010, 2024–2025); Australian Formula 3 (2001–2006, 2009–2010, 2015, 2017–2019); Australian GT Championship (2005–2006, 2017); Fujitsu V8 Supercar Series (2001–2008)

Full Circuit (2024–present)
- Length: 2.350 km (1.460 mi)
- Turns: 13
- Race lap record: 0:54.9450 ( (Australia) Damon Sterling, Hyper Racer X1, 2024, Hyper Racer)

Shelley Circuit (2024–present)
- Length: 2.350 km (1.460 mi)
- Turns: 13

Original Circuit (1994–2022)
- Length: 2.200 km (1.367 mi)
- Turns: 10
- Race lap record: 0:53.0600 ( (Australia) Brad Shiels, Tilton Mitsubishi Evo, 2020, Sports car racing)

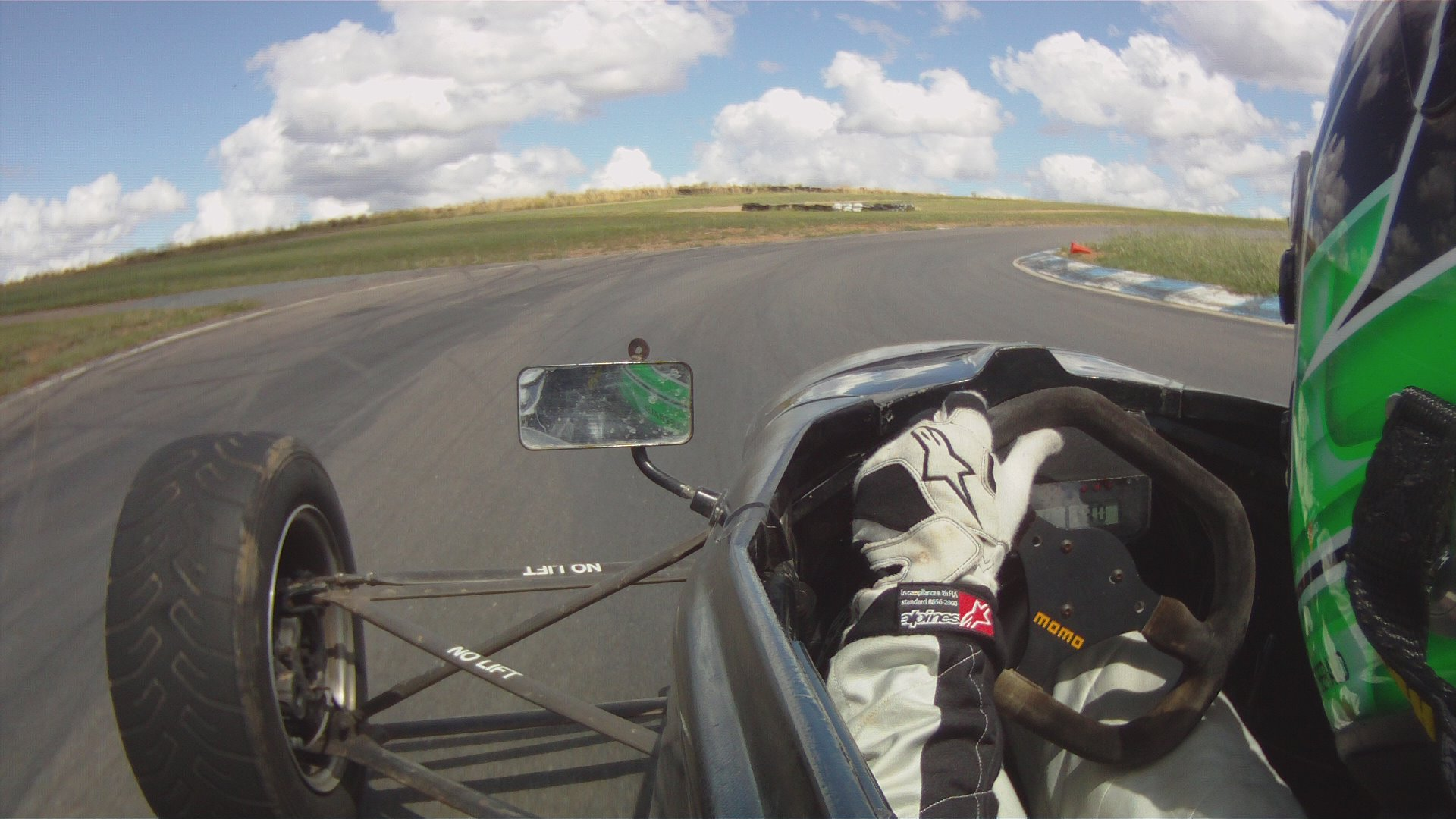
View from a race car at Wakefield Park

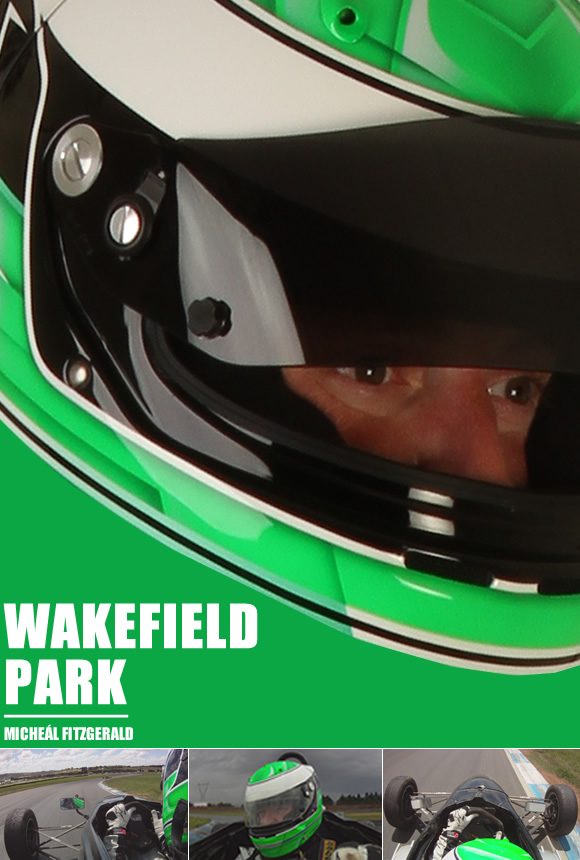
Wakefield Park short film

One Raceway, formerly known as Wakefield Park Raceway, is a 2.350 km (1.460 mi) motor racing circuit located near Goulburn, New South Wales, Australia. It was named after Charles Wakefield, the founder of Castrol. John Carter and Paul Samuels, the founders of Wakefield Park so believed that Castrol deserved recognition for the impact it had on amateur motorsporting events that they chose to honour Charles Wakefield. Wakefield Park was intended for amateur racers in the likelihood in the 1990s of both Amaroo and Oran Park Raceways closing and amateur racers being unable to afford the daily hire rate at Eastern Creek Raceway.

The local arm of Castrol committed to a modest three-year sponsorship deal in appreciation of this honour. Consequently, all the buildings, which were all designed by Samuels and Carter, were in Castrol colours, an appropriate but subtle recognition of the company's involvement. However, Castrol withdrew its sponsorship as it was not getting any appreciable value from the investment.

== History ==
Wakefield Park was the first privately funded circuit built in NSW in the last 35 years and faced considerable hurdles from its conception. Samuels said "when confronting neighbours and the EPA, I can see why". It took them more than a year, despite the help of Goulburn Council and the local member John Fahey, to find a place that finally gained all the necessary approvals. Interestingly, it took less than eight months from turning the first sod in mid-October 1993 to its first meeting on 8 May 1994. The total cost of the land and work was $1.2 million.

Goulburn was chosen as it was close to Canberra, the large population areas of the near south coast around Wollongong, was not too far from Sydney and a three-hour easier journey for Victorians than if it had been close to Sydney.

The road racing circuit has hosted the Fujitsu V8 Supercar Series, the Australian Superbike Championship, the Australian Motor Racing Series, drifting, as well as state and club level racing, also Speed off the Streets and motorcycle ride days.

Wakefield Park operates under a CAMS National Circuit Licence, AASA and also under the Department of Sport and Recreation permit scheme.

The circuit is located two hours drive from Sydney and about one hour from Canberra, and is positioned on Braidwood Road, 10 km (6.2 mi) south of Goulburn on 130 acres (0.53 km^{2}) of cleared land. Safety is paramount and ripple strips, tyre walls and gravel traps have been positioned so as to make Wakefield a very safe circuit on which to run any type of racecar, production car or motorcycle. The track was resurfaced by its new owners, Winton Motor Raceway, in late 2007.

The track is open to the public providing three circuits licensed by the NSW Department of Sport and Recreation, CAMS, and Motorcycling NSW Inc and Australian Karting Association Inc. Commercial "thrill rides" operate there. There is also a hill climb and short variations of the circuit.

Wakefield Park is the title of a 2010 short film with Michael Fitzgerald which was filmed at the circuit.

Having had the number of days on which it operate cut to 30 days per annum after a lengthy legal battle, the circuit closed in August 2022. Following this an e-petition was submitted to the New South Wales Legislative Assembly following the closure of the motorsport park which amassed 28,950 signatures upon closure on October 28, 2022, currently holding the record of the highest amount of signatures ever collected on an e-petition within NSW Government history. The petition was tabled in the Legislative Assembly on 8 November 2022 and later responded to by the Minister of Planning on December 13, 2022.

The Benalla Auto Club announced Steve Shelley, owner of the Pheasant Wood Circuit located in nearby Marulan, would be purchasing the circuit in March 2023 with the new owner intending to work with the local community and Goulburn Mulwaree Council to re-open the facility. The acquisition was finalised on June 6, 2023. The circuit was renovated, and it was reopened in May 2024 as One Raceway.

The first event to use the Shelley loop also referred to as (reverse direction or anti-clockwise) was Bluey’s Roundup hosted by Motor Events Racing on 18–19 January 2025. Owner of the track Steve Shelley led the cars from the grid for a rolling start with his Porsche cup race car.

== Events ==
Current

- January: Motor Events Racing Blueys Roundup
- February: Historic Summer Spectacular
- March: Australian Classic TT, Wakefield 300
- June: Australian Formula Ford Championship
- July: Australian Formula Open
- September: Spring Festival
- August: TCR Australia Touring Car Series
- October: Australian Formula Open
- November: TCR Australia Touring Car Series
- December: Australian Superbike Championship

Former

- Aussie Racing Cars (2003, 2005, 2008, 2022)
- Australasian Superbike Championship (2009–2015)
- Australian Drivers' Championship (2003, 2005–2006, 2009–2010, 2024–2025)
- Australian Formula 3 Championship (2001–2006, 2009–2010, 2015, 2017–2019)
- Australian GT Championship (2005–2006, 2017)
- Australian Improved Production Nationals (2014)
- Australian Nations Cup Championship (2001–2004)
- Australian Super Touring Championship (2000–2001)
- Fujitsu V8 Supercar Series (2001–2008)
- Porsche Carrera Cup Australia Championship (2006, 2008)
- TA2 Racing Muscle Car Series (2024)
- V8 Ute Racing Series (2001–2007)

== Lap records ==
As of October 2025, the fastest official race lap records at One Raceway (formerly Wakefield Park) are listed as:

Category	Time	Driver	Vehicle	Date
Full Circuit (2024–present): 2.350 km (1.460 mi)
Hyper Racer	0:54.9450	(Australia) Damon Sterling	Hyper Racer X1	27 October 2024
Superbike	0:58.626	(Australia) Cameron Dunker	Yamaha YZF-R1	5 October 2025
Sports Sedans	0:59.1070	(Australia) Geoff Taunton	IRC GT SS	8 December 2024
TA2	0:59.6610	(Australia) Josh Haynes	Ford Mustang Trans-Am	27 October 2024
Sports car racing	0:59.6950	(Australia) Mark Brame	Radical SR3	7 December 2024
Supersport	1:00.155	(Australia) Archie McDonald	Yamaha YZF-R6	5 October 2025
Formula Ford	1:02.2370	(Australia) Harvey Norman	Mygale SJ12	8 December 2024
Superkart	1:03.1750	(Australia) Laurie Fooks	Raider SKT	8 December 2024
Improved Production Cars	1:05.5150	(Australia) Matthew Birks	Toyota Corolla (AE82)	19 October 2025
Supersport 300	1:05.710	(Australia) Scott Nicholson	Kawasaki Ninja 400	4 October 2025
Formula Vee	1:06.3910	(Australia) Michael Kinsella	Jacer F2K10	26 October 2024
Legends car racing	1:07.0350	(Australia) Askr Sendall	Ford Coupé	27 October 2024
Formula RX8	1:10.0810	(Australia) Thomas Derwent	Mazda RX-8	26 October 2024
Excel Cup	1:12.5810	(Australia) Ethan Grigg-Gault	Hyundai Excel	8 December 2024
Oceania Junior Cup	1:14.968	(Australia) Connor Lewis	Yamaha YZF-R15	5 October 2025
Original Circuit (1994–2022): 2.200 km (1.367 mi)
Sports car racing	0:53.0600	(Australia) Brad Shiels	Tilton Mitsubishi Evo	25 July 2020
Formula Three	0:53.7045	(Australia) Harri Jones	F308	8 September 2018
Sports Sedans	0:56.2669	(Australia) Jack Perkins	Audi A4-Chevrolet	18 October 2015
Radical Cup	0:56.7805	(Australia) Tim Berryman	Radical SR8	20 June 2015
Superbike	0:56.787	(Australia) Wayne Maxwell	Ducati Panigale V4 R	18 April 2021
Formula 4000/OzBoss	0:57.5504	(Australia) Ty Hanger	Reynard 95D	25 February 2007
Supersport	0:58.433	(Australia) Broc Pearson	Yamaha YZF-R6	18 April 2021
Porsche Carrera Cup	0:58.9927	(Australia) Aaron Caratti	Porsche 911 (997 I) GT3 Cup	5 April 2008
Dunlop V8 Supercar	0:59.0351	(Australia) Steve Owen	Holden VZ Commodore	6 April 2008
GT3	0:59.1113	(New South Wales) Rod Salmon	Audi R8 LMS ultra GT3	19 November 2017
Nations Cup	0:59.9060	(Australia) John Bowe	Ferrari 360 N-GT	1 June 2003
Formula Ford	1:00.1986	(Australia) Paul Laskazeski	Spectrum 011	6 April 2008
V8 Touring Cars	1:00.2464	Justin Ruggier	Holden Commodore VZ	18 October 2014
Australian GT	1:01.5344	(Australia) Greg Crick	Dodge Viper GTS	5 March 2006
Super Touring	1:02.1715	(Australia) Paul Morris	BMW 320i	29 October 2000
Improved Production Over 2 Litre	1:02.8626	(Australia) Michael King	Mitsubishi Lancer Evo VIII	8 September 2019
Sidecar	1:03.661	(Australia) Corey Turner/Danyon Turner	Suzuki LCR 1000	17 April 2021
Supersport 300	1:04.780	(Australia) Ben Baker	Yamaha YZF-R3	18 April 2021
Improved Production Under 2 Litre	1:05.1999	(Australia) Jordan Cox	Honda Civic	12 April 2015
Aussie Racing Cars	1:05.6777	(Australia) Ben McCashney	Falcon-Yamaha	5 April 2008
Commodore Cup	1:06.6504	(Australia) Geoff Emery	Holden VS Commodore	3 April 2011
Group A	1:07.0363	(Australia) Craig Markland	Nissan Skyline HR31 GTS-R	1 April 2007
Formula Vee	1:07.0951	(Australia) Michael Kinsella	Jacer F2K10	12 April 2015
Group N	1:07.0160	(Australia) Brad Tilley	Ford Mustang	23 February 2019
V8 Utes	1:09.6544	(Australia) Kerry Wade	Ford BF Falcon XR8 Ute	28 May 2006
Oceania Junior Cup	1:14.677	(Australia) Marcus Hamod	Yamaha YZF-R15	24 April 2022
HQ Holden	1:15.3402	(Australia) Glenn Deering	Holden HQ	27 May 2018
