= Hyper Racer =

Open-wheel racing car

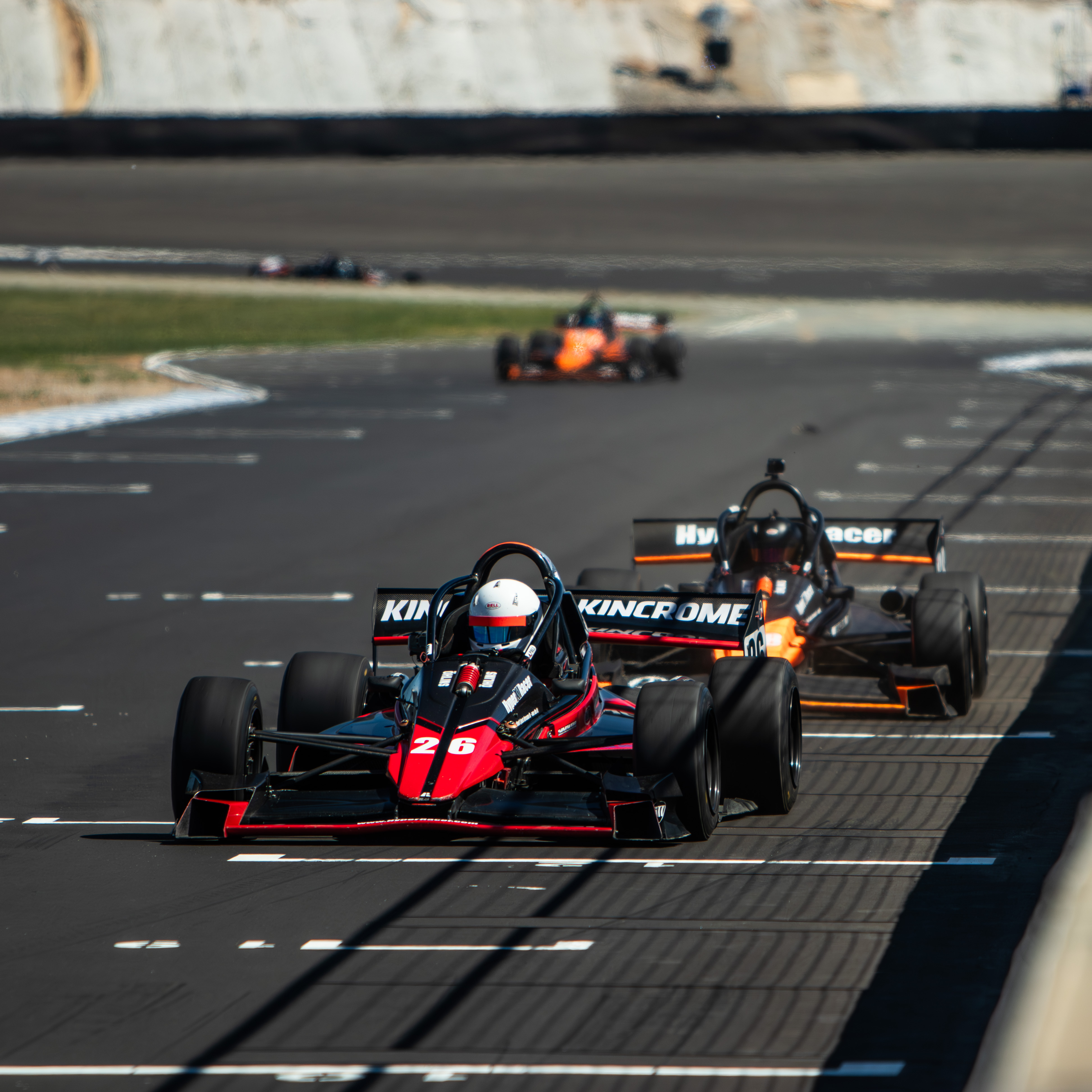
Hyper Racer X1

The Hyper Racer is a relatively low-cost, high-performance circuit racing open-wheel car for both seasoned and aspiring racing drivers. Manufactured by Racing Cars International P/L in Melbourne, Australia, the Hyper Racer X1 was designed and built by the founders, father-and-son team Jon Crooke (Director of Design) and Dean Crooke (Director of Engineering and Product Development).

== Design ==
The Hyper Racer's design is unusual for a modern high-performance open wheeler, in that it uses a chrome-moly space frame chassis rather than a Carbon-fiber Monocoque, primarily to reduce manufacturing and repair costs. The suspension features relatively few adjustments, to limit the difficulty of setup for inexperienced drivers. It also uses Ground effects and a relatively large front and rear wing, to increase downforce to increase cornering speeds and improve handling at the expense of top speed.

The Hyper Racer is powered by a largely unmodified Suzuki Hayabusa motorcycle engine producing 195 hp (144 kW). It uses the Hayabusa gearbox with shifting controlled by a sequential shifter to the right of the driver's wheel, and a Centrifugal clutch, eliminating the need for a clutch pedal.

The car uses a Formula 3 tyre, manufactured by Hankook.

The Hyper Racer weighs approximately 400 kilograms dry.

== Series ==
The Hyper Racer X1 has been used for a one-make racing series in Victoria, Australia since 2022. In 2024, the series added interstate rounds and acquired the rights to represent the Australian Drivers' Championship.
