= Dragstrip =

Car racing facility

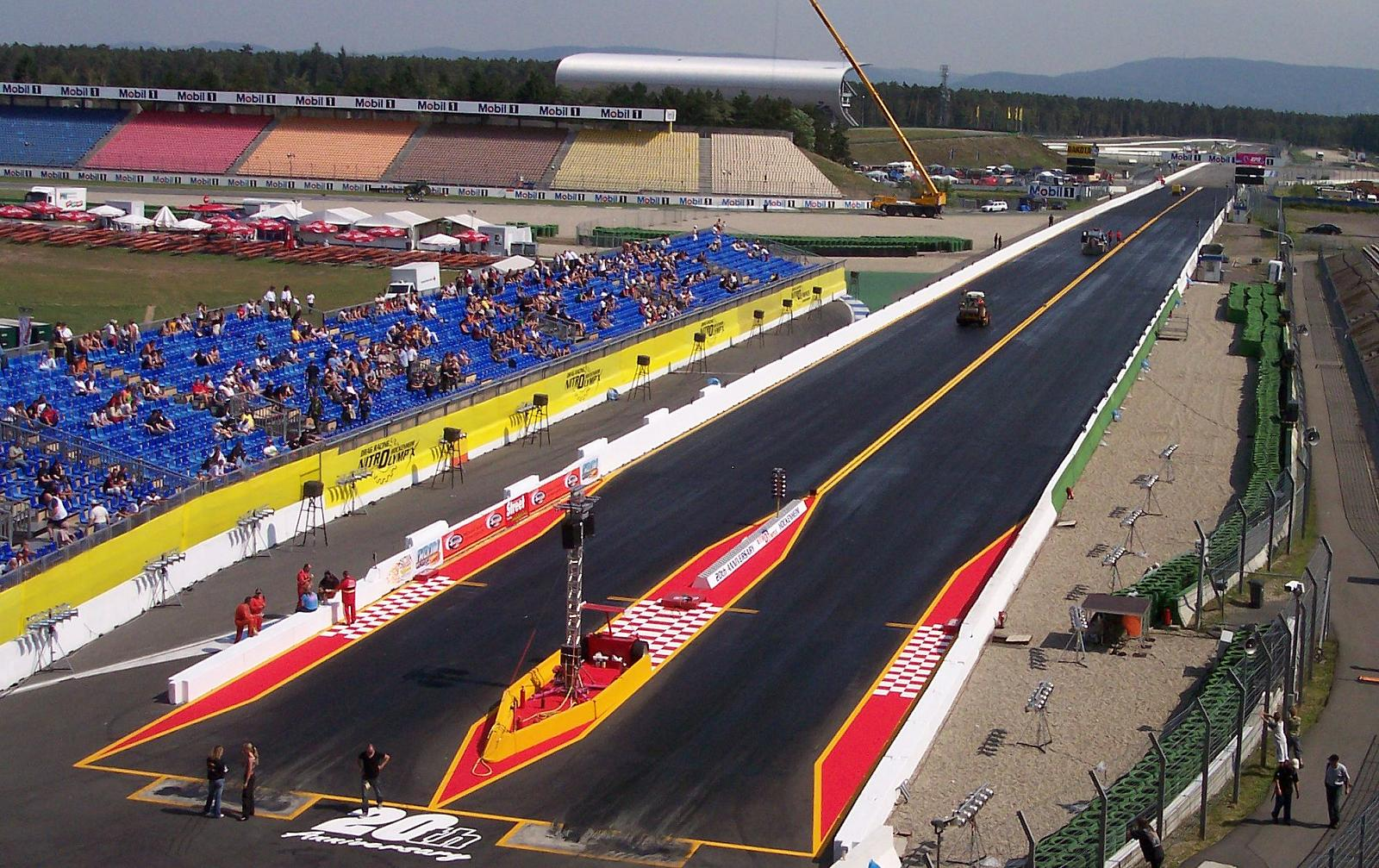
The Hockenheimring dragstrip, 2005

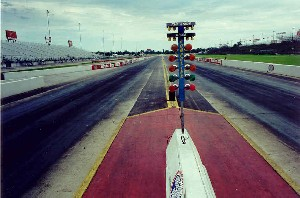
Looking down a drag strip. Note the Christmas tree countdown lights in the center

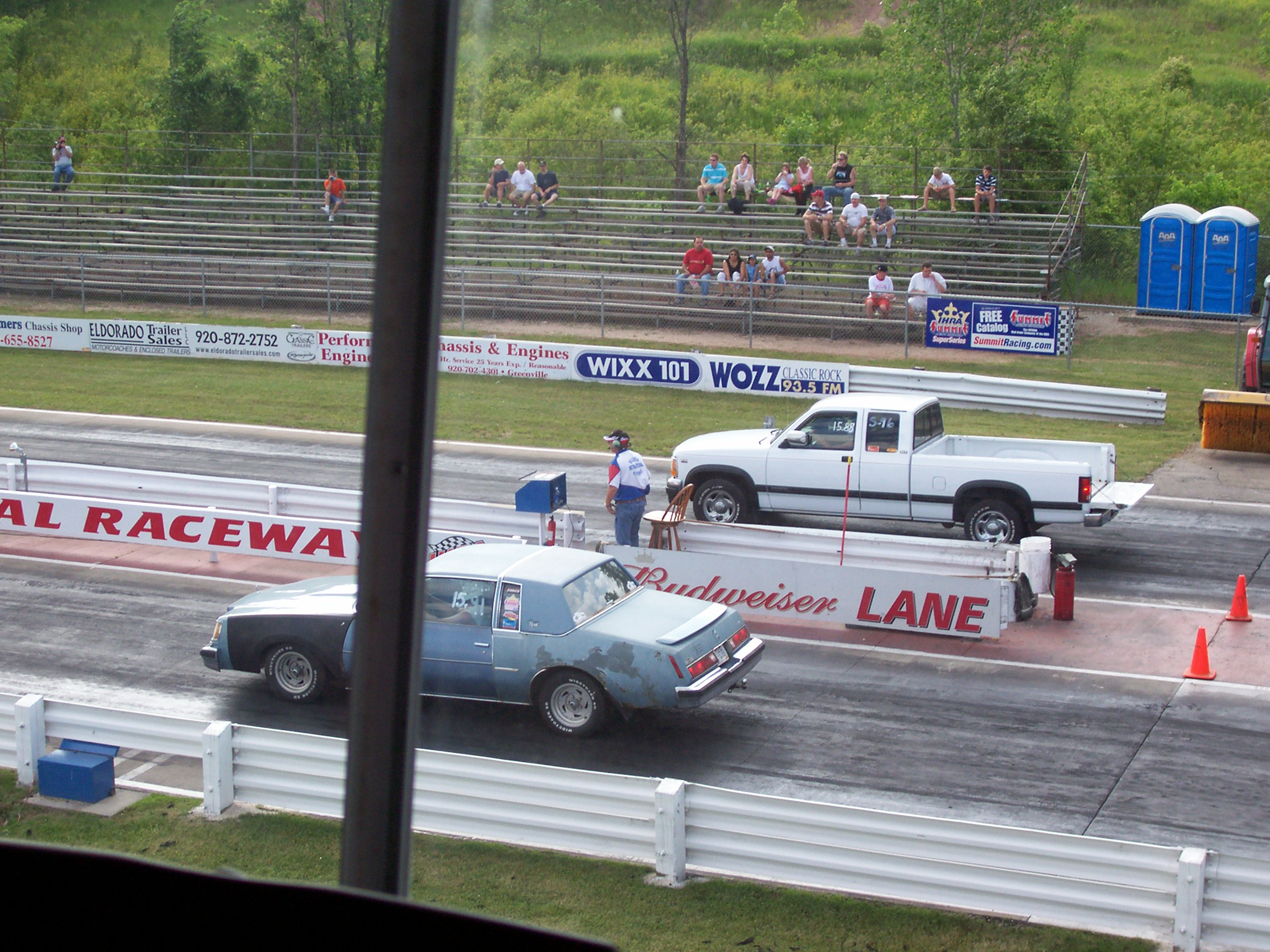
Drag racing vehicles ready to race

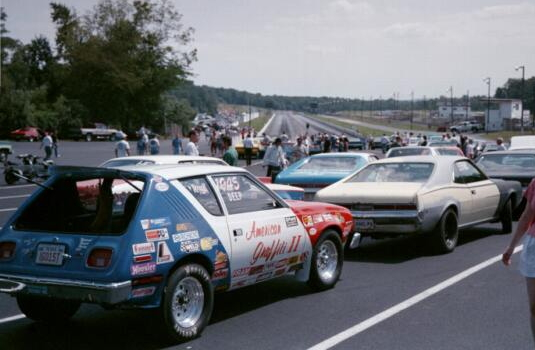
Bring your own cars waiting to run down the dragstrip

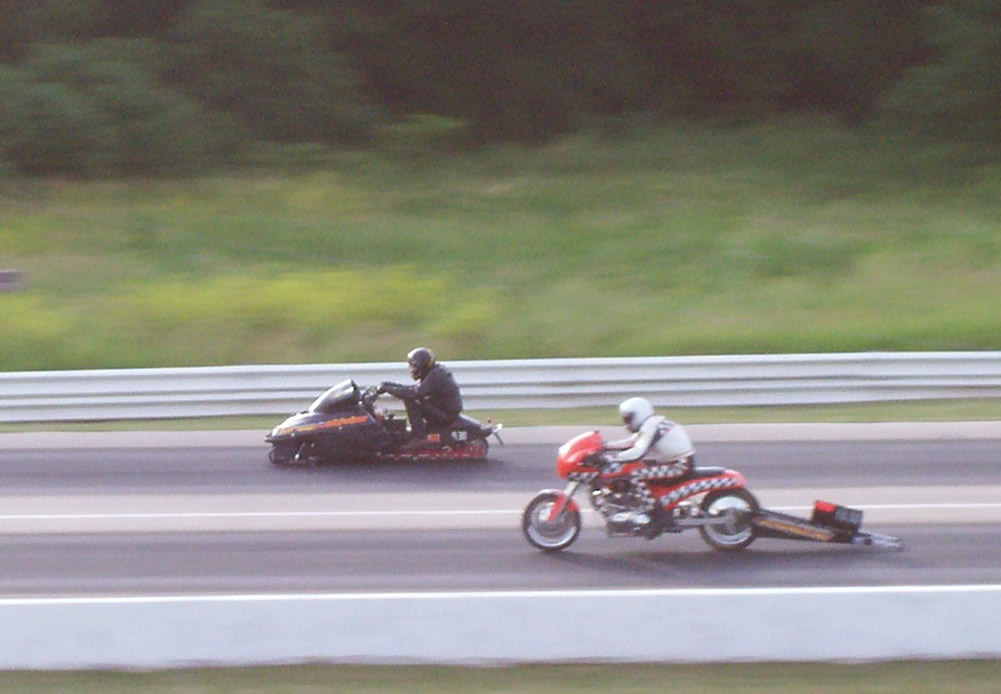
Snowmobile vs. Motorcycle

A dragstrip is a facility for conducting automobile and motorcycle acceleration events such as drag racing. Although a quarter mile (1320 feet, 402 m) is the best known measure for a drag track, many tracks are eighth mile (201 m) tracks, and the premiere classes will run 1,000 foot (304.8 m) races. The race is begun from a standing start which allows three factors to affect the outcome of the race: reaction time, power/weight ratio, and traction.

== Features ==
A dragstrip is a straight, purpose-built racetrack, typically an eighth, ten feet longer than three-sixteenths, or a quarter of a mile long (660/1,000/1320 feet, 201/304.8/402 m), with an additional shutdown area to allow vehicles room to stop after crossing the finish line. Common features also include a 'water box' where vehicles and motorcycles start their burnouts for tire clean-up and also to heat up their tires to improve traction. There is a set of lights known as a 'Christmas Tree' that counts down to the start. There are also return lanes for the vehicles to return from the end of the track to the pit area.

== Vehicle equipment requirements ==
Like all other motorsports, drag racing has many safety requirements for the vehicles that compete. These can be found in the applicable governing body's rule book. Most rules do not apply until the vehicle exceeds a specified time, such as 10.99 seconds. This allows anyone with a regular production vehicle to take part for very little cost, and encourages participation of many people who cannot afford a proper racing vehicle. The grassroots efforts are primarily bracket racing cars. Many classes allow drivers to drive their street cars and participate in an event.

== Quarter mile times ==
Acceleration times differ even between identical vehicles due to widely varying factors - vehicle tune, elevation, driver/rider differences, payload, track surface conditions, weather conditions.

Racing vehicles
| Vehicle | Elapsed time | Notes |
|---|---|---|
| Rocket dragster | 3.2 s at ~390 mph (630 km/h) | Kitty O'Neil, 1977 in the Mojave Desert |
| Top Fuel Dragster | ET: 4.443 s at ~335.32 mph (539.65 km/h) | Damien Harris, 9 June 2017, Willowbank Raceway; Absolute record. Last quarter-mile championship Top Fuel meet. |
| Top Fuel Dragster | Speed: 4.485 s at ~338.35 mph (544.52 km/h) | Dom Lagana, 9 September 2017, US 131 Motorsports Park, Martin, MI. Run at IHRA US exhibition event. Certified speed by IHRA. |
| Top Fuel Dragster (1000 foot) | ET: 3.701 s at ~328.78 mph (529.12 km/h) | Antron Brown, 8 October 2012, Maple Grove Raceway, Mohnton, PA |
| Top Fuel Dragster (1000 foot) | Speed: 3.802 s at ~332.18 mph (534.59 km/h) | Spencer Massey, 15 April 2012, Concord, NC |
| Top Fuel Funny Car (1000 foot) | 3.901 s at ~325.69 mph (524.15 km/h) | Jack Beckman, 22 August 2015, Brainerd International Raceway |
| Top Alcohol Dragster | ET: 5.103 s at ~284.75 mph (458.26 km/h) | Bill Reichert, 1 April 2007, Houston Raceway Park |
| Top Alcohol Dragster | 5.2 s at Speed: ~285.23 mph (459.03 km/h) | Donald St. Arnaud, 10 November 2016, Auto Club Raceway (Pomona) |
| Pro Modified; Top Doorslammer in Australia | 5.745 s at ~252.24 mph (405.94 km/h) | John Zappia, 8 June 2013, Willowbank Raceway |
| Pro Stock | 6.455 s at ~214.48 mph (345.17 km/h) | Jason Line, 29 March 2015, at zMax Dragway |
| Top Fuel Bike | 5.799 s at 245.36 mph (394.87 km/h) | Larry McBride, March 2006, Valdosta, Georgia |
| Pro Stock Motorcycle | 6.75 s at ~199.26 mph (320.68 km/h) | Eddie Krawiec, 10 March 2012, at Gainesville Raceway |
| Electric Motorcycle | 6.94 s at ~201.37 mph (324.07 km/h) | Larry McBride, 4 May 2012, at Virginia Motorsports Park |

NOTE: Nitro Funny Car records set at 1,000 ft (300 m), which since 2008 in the US by NHRA, 2012 internationally by FIA, and 2017 in Australia by IHRA is the official distance for both Top Fuel and Funny Car in the respective sanctioning bodies.

All official records must be backed up within one percent during the same race meet in order to be claimed. The official records for terminal velocity and elapsed time are different in the professional car categories, and only the elapsed time run (and respective speed of that run) is listed. There have been some cases where a car has run faster than the official record, but because they were not backed up within one percent during the same meet, they are not recognised by the NHRA, IHRA, or FIA. The Top Fuel record listed as the final quarter-mile record in IHRA prior to off-season rule change at the end of 2016–17 season that shortened Top Fuel to 1,000 feet.

== See also ==
- List of fastest production cars by acceleration
