= Top Doorslammer =

Australian class of drag racing

Top Doorslammer is a professional (Pro) class of Australian drag racing. It caters to full-bodied racing sedans which are replicas of Australian or US production vehicles. The class uses 514 cu. in. displacement (8.5-litre), mechanically supercharged V8 engines which are fueled by methanol. The minimum weight break for these vehicles is 2700 lbs (1225 kg). It is similar to the Pro Modified class as defined by the NHRA.

Top Doorslammer is regulated by ANDRA, and is considered a Group 1 or professional category. It is the fastest sedan based category in the world, using replicas of front-engined production sedans, coupes, station wagon and utility vehicles usually produced by Holden, Ford, Dodge, Studebaker and Chevrolet. As its name suggests, these cars have operational doors, therefore Funny Car style bodies are not allowed in this class.

Some notable drivers competing in this category are John Zappia, Peter Kapiris, Lance Larcombe, Victor Bray, Ben Bray, Gary Phillips, and Maurice Fabietti. During the summer months, because of rules similar to Pro Modified, such stars in the United States frequently appear during the North American winter during the International Hot Rod Association 400 Thunder series currently. For example, during the 2017-18 IHRA season, Texan Frankie "Mad Man" Taylor drove a second Bray Racing car when the drag strips closed for the winter.

Top Doorslammer originally started out as an exhibition class called Wild Bunch with notable pioneers John Zappia and Victor Bray. After a number of successful years of running the class, ANDRA recognised the class worthy of a professional bracket. By 1996 Top Doorslammer was officially recognised as a Group 1 class, and has since grown into one of the most successful brackets.

== Television broadcasting ==
Top Doorslammer Championship is on SBS Speedweek and the new SPEED Channel on Foxtel.

== 2010/2011 ANDRA Pro Series Championship calendar and results ==
Round 1: Fuchs Australian nationals 10–12 September, Sydney Dragway, NSW
Runner Up: Maurice Fabietti Winner: Robin Judd

Round 2: Goldenstate Titles 3–4 Dec, Perth Motorplex, WA
Runner up: John Zappia Winner:Mark Belleri

Round 3: 40th Westernationals 5–6 March, Perth Motorplex, WA
Runner up: Maurice Fabietti Winner:John Zappia

Round 4: ANDRA Pro Series 18–19 March, Sydney Dragway, NSW
"RAIN OUT"

Round 5: 2011 Nitro Champs 29 April – 1 May, Sydney Dragway, NSW
Runner up: Peter Kapiris Winner: John Zappia

Round 6:

Round 7: 2011 Castrol EDGE Winternationals Willowbank Raceway, QLD RAIN OUT FINAL Finalist:Mark Belleri and Peter Kapiris

== 2011/2012 ANDRA Pro Series Championship calendar ==
Round 1: 2011 Fuchs Australian nationals 9–11 September, Sydney Drag way, NSW WINNER: Peter Kapiris

Round 2: 2011 40th Annual Goldenstate Titles 18–19 November, Perth Motorplex, WA
WINNER: Peter Kapiris

Round 3: 2012 41st Westernationals 3–4 March, Perth Motorplex, WA
WINNER: John Zappia

Round 4: 23–24 March, Sydney Dragway, NSW WINNER: John Zappia

Round 5: 2012 Nitro Champs, 4–6 May, Sydney Dragway, NSW WINNER: John Zappia

Round 6: 2012 45th FUCHS Winternationals 8–11 June Willowbank Raceway, QLD

== 2011/2012 ANDRA Pro Series Championship points Top Ten ==
Position	Driver	Points	Wins	Poles
1	John Zappia WA	370	2	1
2	Peter Kapiris VIC	348.5	2	1
3	Robin Judd WA	334.5		2
4	Mark Belleri NSW	163.5		
5	Martyn Dack WA	146		
6	Victor Bray QLD	138		
7	Ben Bray QLD	107		
8	Maurice Fabietti NSW	106		
9	Andrew Sutton NT	85		
10	Gary Phillips	160		

Points Allocation

Winner- 100

Runner up- 80

Semi Final lose- 60

Quarter Final Lose- 40

Non Qualifier- 20

Low Elapsed Time- 5

Top Speed- 5

- 50% bonus for points scored at Championship rounds in Western Australia

== Top Doorslammer drivers ==
Driver	Sponsors	Car	Engine
John Zappia	Procomp Motorsport / Strikercrushing.com / Fuchs	1971 Holden HQ Monaro	Hemi 514
Mathew Abel	Abel Tiling Services	1957 Chevrolet Belair	Hemi 511
Geoff Gradden	Sigra	Dodge Saratoga Top Doorslammer	
Stuart Bishop	Wallace Bishop Jewelers / Stuart Bishop Racing	1967 Chevrolet Camaro	Hemi 511
Ben Bray	Team Bray/sidchrome	2005 Holden Monaro CV8Z	BAE 511
Shane Catalano	Catalano Family Racing	1953 Studebaker Champion	
Victor Bray	Team Bray Racing/Sidchrome	1957 Chevy	BAE 511
Tony De Felice	Vicios Rumour	1967 Chevrolet Camaro	Riolo Racing 511
Maurice Fabietti	Holden Trade Club / Holden Genuine Parts	2006 Holden Monaro CV8Z	KB 511
Brett Gillespie	BHe Electrical Contractors	1934 Chevrolet Coupe	
Robin Judd	Aeroflow	1959 Studebaker Champion	KB 511
Peter Kapiris	Kapiris Bros. Racing	1959 Dodge Seratoga	BAE 521
Gary Phillips	Lucas Oil	1953 Studebaker Commander	BAE 511
Mark Belleri	Narrabeen Smash Repairs	1967 Chevrolet Camaro	TFX 522
Sean Mifsud	PPG	1941 Willys	
Andrew Sutton	Sutton Motorsport	2005 Holden Monaro CV8X	
Russell Pavey	United Tools	1963 Chevrolet Corvette	BAE 521
David Simpson	Hidden Valley Eco Spa Lodges & Day Spa	1967 Ford Mustang	BAE 511
Scott MacLean	S&M Racing	1953 Studebaker Commander	
Pino Priolo	Team Budget Forklift	1937 Chevy Coupe	KB 526
Murray O'Connor	Penrite	196- Ford XM Falcon	BAE 511
Daniel Gregorini	Scratch & Match Motorsports	Chevrolet Camaro	BAE 521
Marty Dack	Auto One	200- Ford Falcon (BA)	Hemi 520
Phillp Glendenning	All State Shopfitting	200- Ford Falcon (BA)	BAE 521
John Cannuli	PowerCruise / Wash It Australia / Crossroads Racing	1967 Chevrolet Camaro	
Rino D'Alfonso	Metro Holden	2010 HSV VE Clubsport	KB Hemi 521
Peter Blake	Racetech Steel	1970 Ford Mustang	Hemi 511

== ANDRA National records ==
Elapsed Time: 5.693 seconds John Zappia, 7 June 2015, FUCHS Winternationals, Willowbank Raceway

Speed: 258.42 mph (415.89 km/h) P. Kapiris, Sydney Dragway, May 2013.

== Track records ==
Perth Motorplex

Track ET Record - 5.683 Seconds John Zappia, 6 February 2016

Track Speed Record - 253.86 mph (408.55 km/h) John Zappia, 6 February 2016

== Top Doorslammer 5 Second Club ==
The Top Doorslammer 5 Second Club is a group of drivers who have run a quarter-mile in the 5 second range. Only 12 drivers have ever managed to run a 5-second time. John Zappia was the first in the world to run a legal Doorslammer 5 with a 5.967 second pass at 241.97 mph, on 17 September 2005, in his Rentco Monaro Top Doorslammer at Western Sydney International Raceway, NSW.

Driver	Time
John Zappia	5.683
Deno Brijeski	5.956
Robin Judd	5.822
Gary Phillips	5.939
Maurice Fabietti	5.84
Peter Kapiris	5.809
Ben Bray	5.880
Russ Pavey	5.898
Stuart Bishop	5.98
Matt Abel	5.981
Mark Belleri	5.902
Aaron Lynch	5.973

== Pro Series sponsors ==
Official sponsors

- Fuchs
- Sidchrome Official tool

== ANDRA Pro Series tracks ==
- Perth Motorplex Kwinana Beach, WA
- Western Sydney International Dragway Eastern Creek, NSW
- Willowbank Raceway Ipswich, QLD
- Adelaide International Raceway South Australia
- Hidden Valley Raceway Darwin, Northern Territory

== Past champions ==
Year	Name
1995-96	Victor Bray
1996-97	Victor Bray
1997-98	Victor Bray
1998-99	Victor Bray
1999-00	Victor Bray
2000-01	Victor Bray
2001-02	Peter Kapiris
2002-03	Ben Bray
2003-04	Brett Stevens
2004-05	Ben Bray
2005-06	Steve Stanic
2006-07	Gary Phillips
2007-08	John Zappia
2008-09	John Zappia
2009-10	John Zappia
2010-11	John Zappia
2011-12	John Zappia
2012-13	John Zappia
2013-14	John Zappia
2014-15	John Zappia
2015-16	John Zappia
