= Pro Modified =

Competition class in drag racing

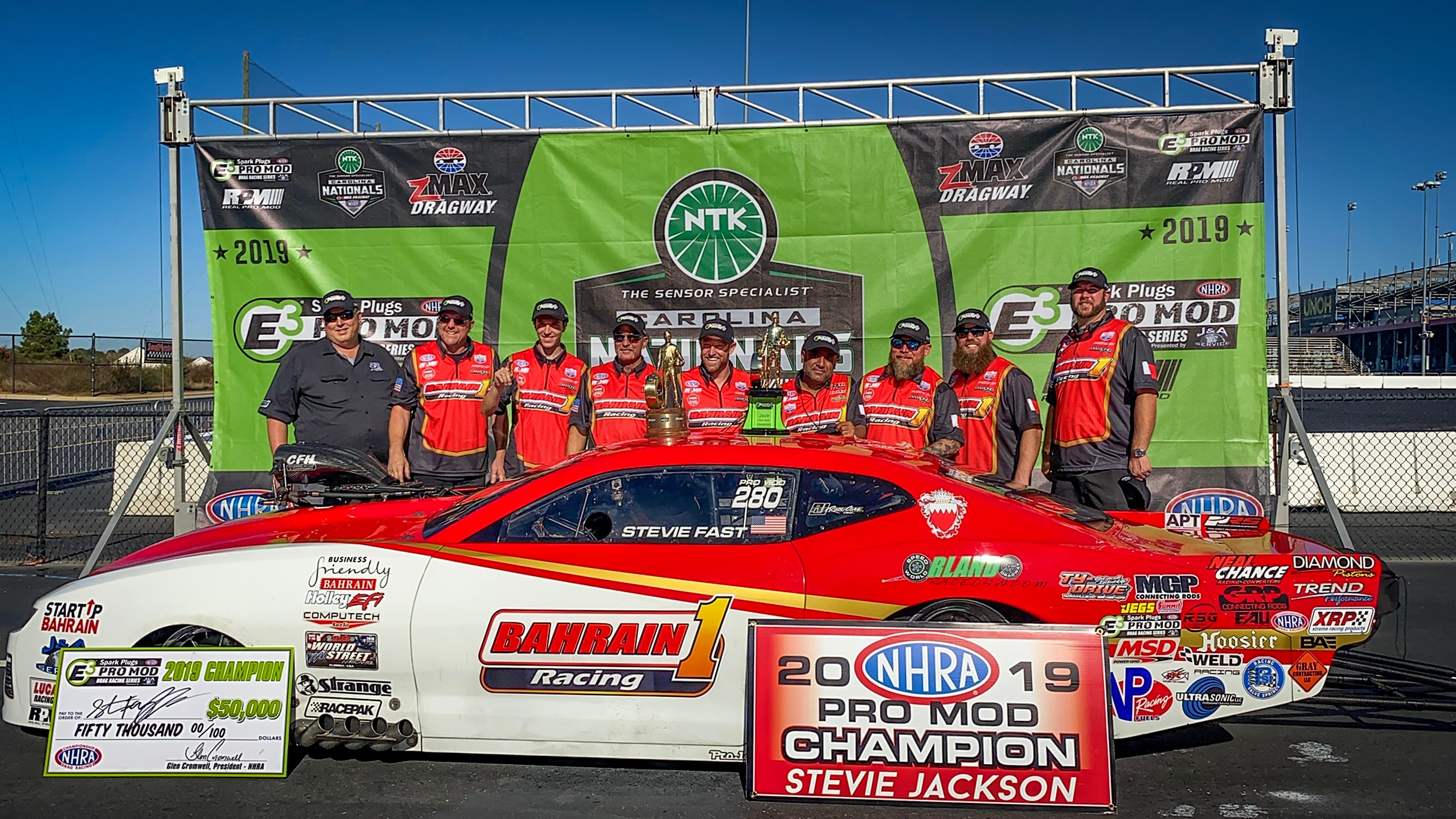
Winners circle for the NHRA Pro Mod Champions October 15, 2019, Team Sponsor: Bahrain 1 Racing Team: Killing Time Racing Driver: Steve Jackson AKA Stevie "Fast" Jackson Tuner: Billy Stocklin

Pro Modified, also known as Pro Mod, is a class or division in the sport of drag racing used in the NHRA and FIA (quarter-mile), the new International Hot Rod Association (IHRA) and the Professional Drag Racers Association (PDRA) (eighth-mile). It is similar to the Top Doorslammer class as defined by the ANDRA.

== Overview ==
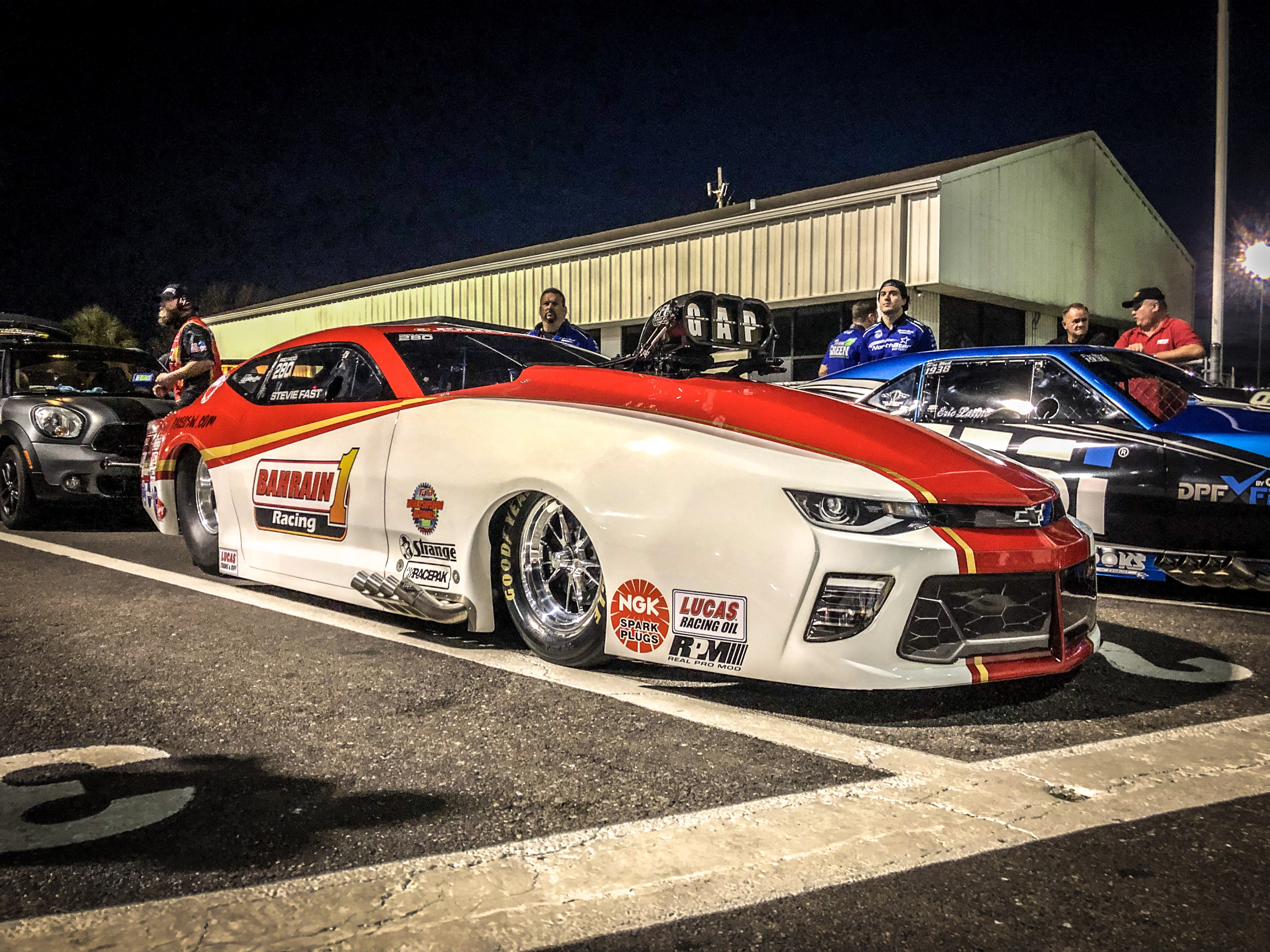
2019 Super Charged Pro Modified Chevrolet Camaro driven by Stevie "Fast" Jackson & Sponsored by Bahrain 1 Racing

This division has specific rules about engines, components, bodies, etc. Pro Modifieds can either be raced on 1/4 mile or 1/8 mile tracks. Usually, the NHRA races Pro Mod cars on the 1/4 mile, resulting in high 5 to low 6 second passes, while the IHRA and PDRA race strictly on 1/8 mile track setups, allowing for high 3 second-to low 4 second passes. Despite Pro Modified cars being slower than the Top Fuel or Funny Car classes, it has become one of the most popular divisions of the sport because of being full-bodied cars resembling Pro Stock cars with a hood scoop or superchargers being permitted.

The Professional Drag Racers Association and the 2025 version of the International Hot Rod Association's Pro Modified classes are based on which type of power adder is used (turbochargers or superchargers in Boost in PDRA or Pro Modified in IHRA, while nitrous oxide is in Nitrous, while both are allowed in IHRA Outlaw Pro Modified). Due to the near-limitless engine/drivetrain combinations and incredibly lenient rule system used by most Pro Modified racing organizations (for example, no manufacturers matching engine and body requirement), competing teams in this series of drag racing have virtually every freedom to make their car as fast and competitive as it can possibly be.

The Pro Modified class originated in the UK in 1988, and was followed in the USA by the IHRA a year later. In Europe, Pro Modified moved from the NDRS to become an FIA class in 2006. The off season between the 2009 and 2010 seasons was the most controversial in years. The IHRA, the first sanctioning body to run the class in the USA, dropped the class in a move to focus more on nitromethane powered vehicles. Picking up where the IHRA left off, the NHRA announced that through a partnership with Get Screened America, Pro Mod would become a full-fledged professional class, running a limited schedule but still competing for national event trophies and a world champion. The new IHRA in 2025 began running Pro Modified in three classes (Outlaw, Pro Modified, Pro Nitrous) as an eighth-mile class.

The winningest drivers in US Pro Modified history are Scotty Cannon, Mike Janis and Shannon Jenkins.

== Engines ==
Starting in the 2020 season there are 4 different engine combinations available for the Pro Modified category. Cars utilizing forced induction via either a turbocharger, roots-type supercharger or Centrifugal-type supercharger are limited to 526 cubic inches with the turbos having a maximum inlet size of 88 millimeters. Both types of forced-induction cars must adhere to a 2,650 lb minimum weight with driver. Normally aspirated vehicles using nitrous oxide are limited to 960ci and 2,425 lbs (1,100 kg) with the driver. Nitrous cars use high octane racing gasoline as fuel while supercharged and turbo cars use methanol as fuel.

These engines put out an extremely large amount of horsepower, some at approximately 2500 to upwards of 4000 H.P. The engines propel the cars down the track at speeds of over 250 mph.The exhaust system is similar to that of a Funny Car. Simple short header pipes bolted onto the engine block heads extend down from the motor and curve upward just before reaching the ground. The exhaust pipes are visible just behind the front wheels of the vehicle. Most of the time, each exhaust port on the heads has its own individual pipe, but in the case of turbocharged engines the four pipes on each side of the engine block converge into one single pipe which then leads into one of the two turbochargers, as Pro Mod engines are almost exclusively charged by one turbocharger on each side of the motor (one turbocharger for each four cylinders), resulting in two exhaust pipes instead of eight.

On November 4, 2019, the NHRA announced the inclusion of the 526ci Centrifugal supercharger as well as the 960ci nitrous injected combinations. Those will be legal for competition as of the first race of the 2020 season. In 2021 and 2022, racer with centrifugal supercharged powertrains took home the NHRA Pro Mod world championship. As of 2023, NHRA announced a rules change to reduce the minimum weight of screw supercharged entries from 2,740 pounds to 2,700 pounds. This change is expected to bring more balance to the competitive field and ensure a level playing field for all teams.

== Bodies ==
The body of a Pro Modified car is somewhat similar to a Pro Stock race car. Pro Mod race cars have either a forward-facing (with the opening in front) hood scoop for nitrous injected cars, or the hood may be cut to allow a supercharger to be fitted through onto a blown motor. Also, a Pro Modified car is usually fitted with a long, flat wing extending from the base of the rear windshield and past where the lip of the trunk lid would be on a normal car. This wing aids in downforce and stability, and helps keep the car on the ground. Many body styles are represented in the Pro Mod class. Everything from a Plymouth Superbird to a Volkswagen Beetle has been seen at the dragstrip in Pro Mod fitting. Some of the more common body styles include the Chevrolet Corvette and Camaro, the Ford Mustang, and Studebaker vehicles. Pick-up trucks, like the Chevrolet S-10 also make for popular Pro Mod vehicle choice, since trucks can feature longer wheelbases (maximum of 125 inches to 115 inches), and full-size truck bodies are allowed a weight break similar to nostalgia bodied cars. The material with which the body of a Pro Modified race car is constructed out of is a Carbon Fiber or similar composites, similar to the material used in the bodies of most race cars. In 2008, the IHRA banned any body style of a current legal Pro Stock car (Chevrolet Cobalt, Dodge Stratus, or Ford Mustang, Holden Commodore, or the former Pontiac G6 GXP) from being used in Pro Modified, but that rule disappeared when the IHRA of that era ceased sanction of the class. Any legal body style is permitted in NHRA or PDRA sanctioned races, with former NHRA Pro Stock Motorcycle champion Matt Smith racing his father's (Trickie Rickie Smith's) 2010-style Chevrolet Camaro at the 2011 U. S. Nationals. Most sanctioning bodies give a weight break to nostalgia bodied cars over contemporary bodied cars.

== See also ==
- Top Fuel
- Funny Car
- Pro Stock
- IHRA
- Scotty Cannon
