= Zappia =

Zappia is a surname. Notable people with the surname include:

- John Zappia, (fl. 2005–2017) Australian drag racer
- Mariangela Zappia (born 1959), Italian diplomat
- Tony Zappia (born 1952), Australian politician and powerlifting champion
