= Castrol =

British lubricants manufacturer

Castrol Limited
- Logo used since 2023
- Formerly: CC Wakefield & Co (1899–1960); Castrol Limited (1960–1966, 2000–present); Burmah-Castrol (1966–2000)
- Type: Private
- Industry: Petroleum
- Founded: 9 March 1899
- Founder: Charles Wakefield
- Headquarters: Castrol Technology Centre, Pangbourne, England
- Key people: Michelle Jou (CEO)
- Products: Lubricants
- Owners: Stonepeak (65%); BP (35%)
- Website: castrol.com

Castrol Limited is a British oil company that markets industrial and automotive lubricants, offering a wide range of oil, greases and similar products for most lubrication applications. The company was originally named CC Wakefield; the name Castrol was originally just the brand name for CC Wakefield's motor oils, but the company eventually changed its name to Castrol when the product name became better-known than the original company name.

== History ==
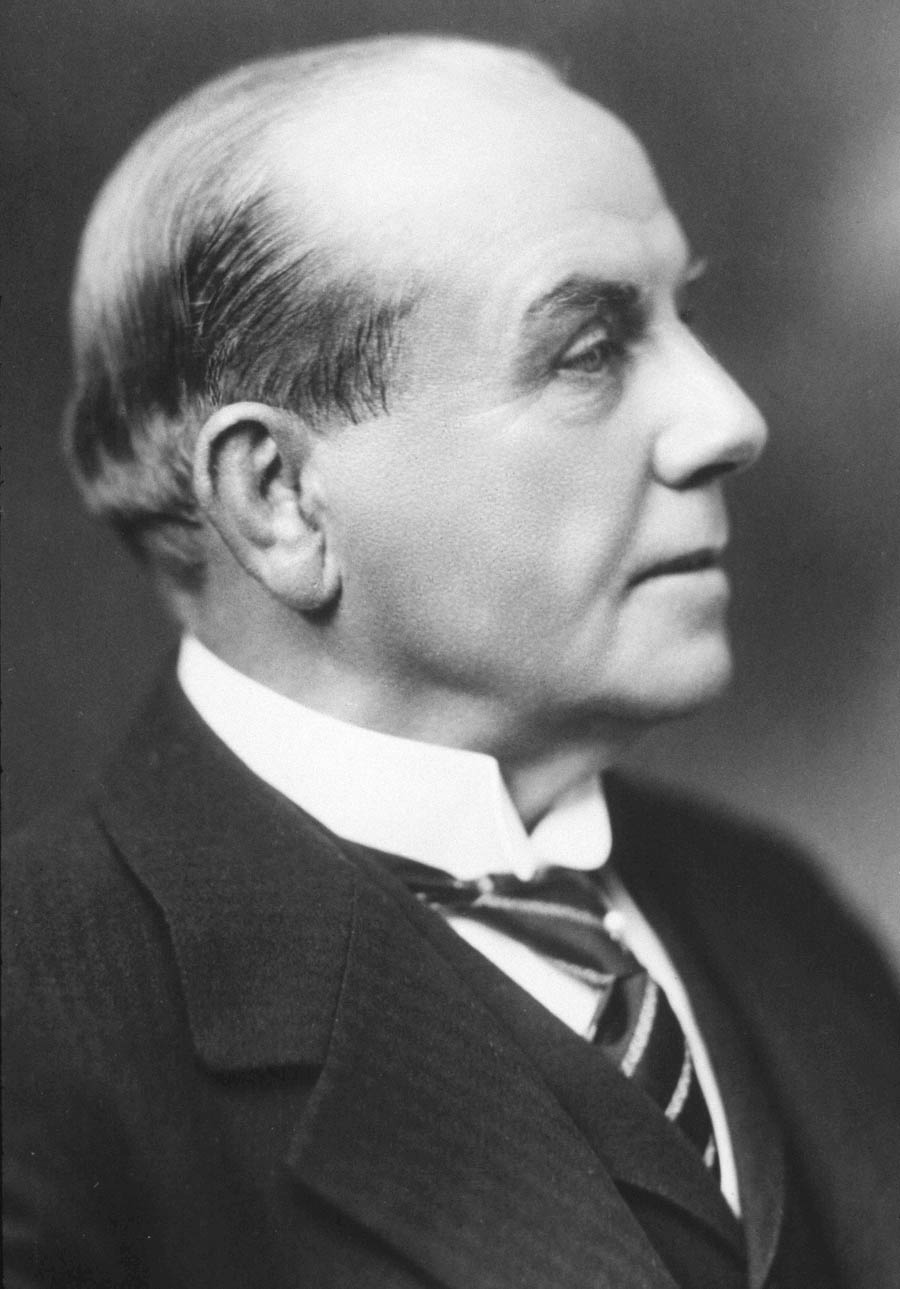
Charles Wakefield, founder

The "Wakefield Oil Company" was founded by Charles Wakefield in Cheapside, London in 1899. Wakefield had previously left a job at Vacuum Oil to start a new business selling lubricants for trains and heavy machinery. Eight Vacuum Oil employees joined Wakefield, and the company launched its first lubricant in 1906.

In early 20th century, Wakefield Co. developed lubricants especially suited for automobiles and aeroplanes. The brand "Castrol" originated after researchers added measured amounts of castor oil (a vegetable oil derived from castor beans) to their lubricant formulations. By 1960, the name of the motor oil had eclipsed the company's name itself so CC Wakefield & Company became Castrol Limited. In 1966, Castrol was acquired by Burmah Oil, which was renamed Burmah-Castrol.

Burmah-Castrol was purchased by BP Amoco in 2000. At the time of purchase, Burmah-Castrol had a turnover of nearly £3 billion with operating profits of £284 million. The company also had 18,000 employees worldwide, with operations in 55 countries. Respectively, BP Amoco had 80,400 employees worldwide and revenues of more than £63 billion. While Burmah's operations folded into the group, Castrol remained as a subsidiary of BP.

In December 2025, it was announced that Stonepeak had agreed to acquire a 65 per cent majority controlling interest in Castrol from BP, valuing the lubricants business at an enterprise value of approximately US$10.1 billion. BP will retain a 35 per cent minority stake, and the Canada Pension Plan Investment Board will invest up to US$1.05 billion for an indirect interest, with the transaction subject to regulatory approvals and expected to complete by the end of 2026. The acquisition was completed on November 2, 2026.

On 1 April 2026, a Castrol oil plant was struck by two Iranian drones during the 2026 Iran war. The facility was engulfed by a large fireball.

Castrol logo, used from 2001 until 2023. The logo shown here is the 2006 revised version.

== Products ==
=== Lubricants ===
Castrol manufactures and markets lubricants, oils and fluids for automotive, commercial vehicle and industrial applications. The exact names of the product groups and types are:

Passenger car engine oils:

- Edge
- Magnatec
- GTX

Motorcycle engine oils:

- Power 1
- Activ

Commercial vehicle engine oils:

- Vecton
- RX
- CRB

Automatic transmission fluids, differential and axle fluids, manual transmission fluids:

- Transmax
- Transynd
- Syntrax

=== Others ===
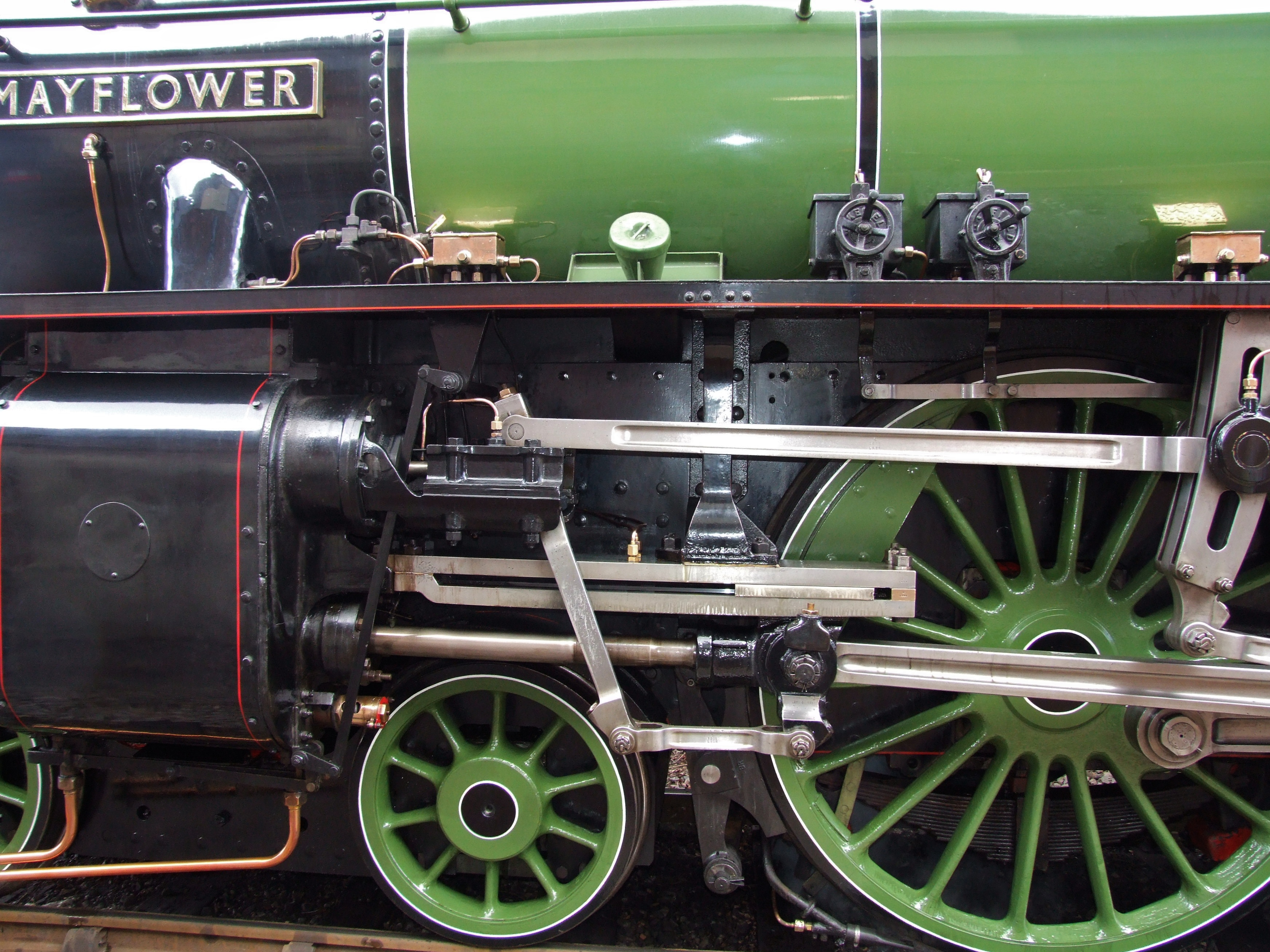
Wakefield mechanical lubricators on preserved LNER Class B1 no. 1306 Mayflower. The bright metal bar at the bottom is the reciprocating connection to the expansion link.

Some steam locomotives were fitted with one or more Wakefield mechanical lubricators. These were normally mounted on the locomotive footplate alongside the boiler, in a position where a mechanical linkage could be made with some point on the locomotive's valve gear or another moving part. The reciprocation of this caused a lever on the lubricator to oscillate, and this was converted to a small rotary movement by a ratchet. The gradual rotation caused a small amount of lubricating oil to be fed into pipes leading to the cylinders, valves and other parts. The amount of oil fed was in proportion to the distance travelled by the locomotive in either direction.

== International divisions ==
=== Wakefield Canada Inc. ===
Wakefield Canada is a Canadian-owned company that serves as the exclusive manufacturer, marketer, and steward of the Castrol brand in Canada. Founded in 2005 by Bob MacDonald and Dave Fifield following BP’s acquisition and global restructuring of Castrol, Wakefield assumed full responsibility for the brand’s operations within the Canadian market. Headquartered in Toronto, Wakefield blends, packages, and distributes Castrol lubricants and operates a nationwide logistics network with facilities in Vancouver, Edmonton, Winnipeg, Toronto, Montreal, and Moncton. The company is credited with developing what BP later termed “The Wakefield Model,” a localized ownership and management framework subsequently adopted in other international markets. In addition to producing Castrol-branded lubricants, Wakefield also manufactures its own Wakefield-branded products and distributes complementary lines such as Super Clean. As of 2025, Wakefield Canada employs over 220 people and continues to invest in domestic manufacturing and innovation tailored to Canada’s automotive, commercial, and industrial sectors.

== Sponsorship ==
=== Motorsport ===
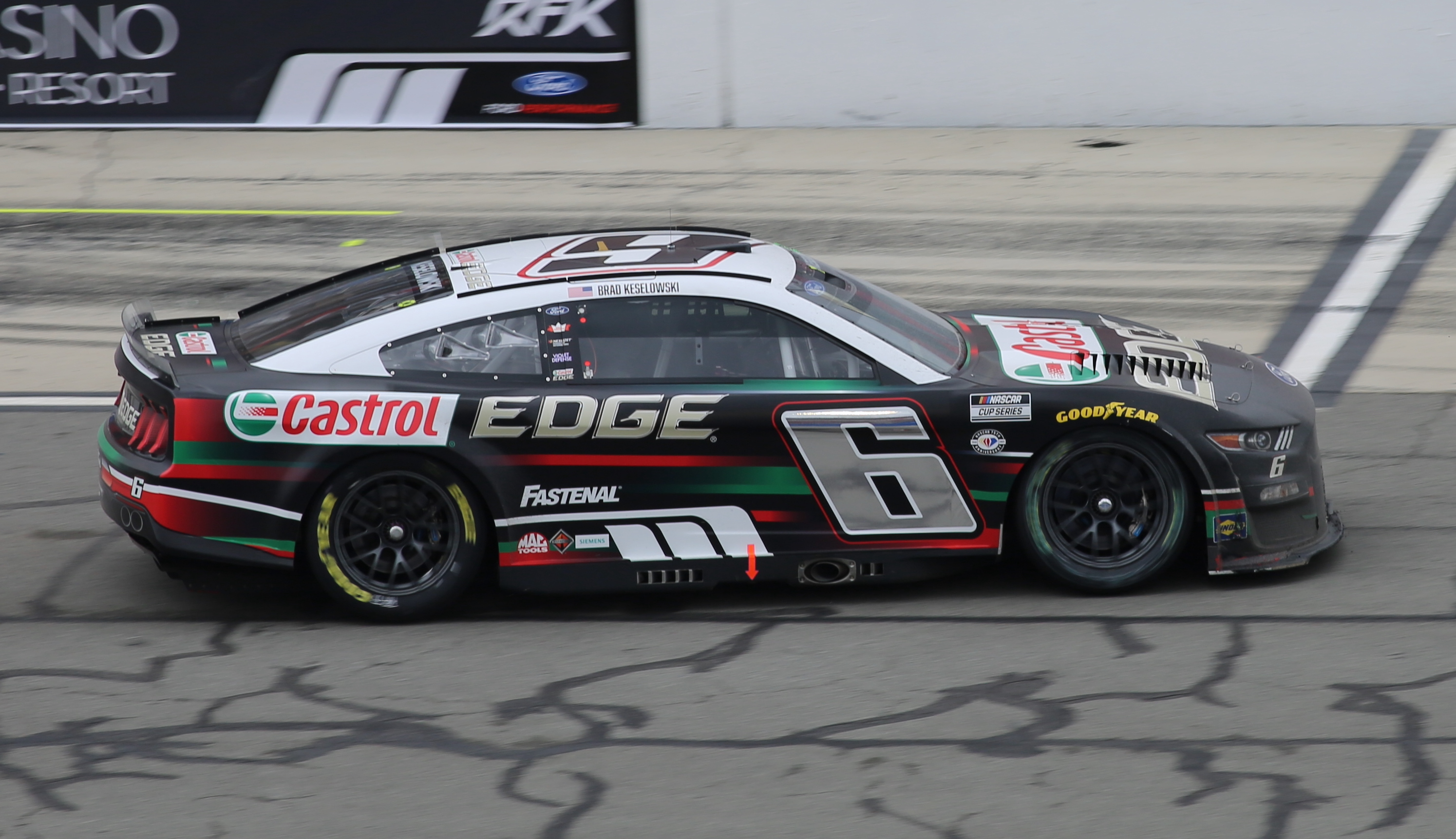
Castrol sponsored NASCAR Cup Series Ford Mustang for Brad Keselowski

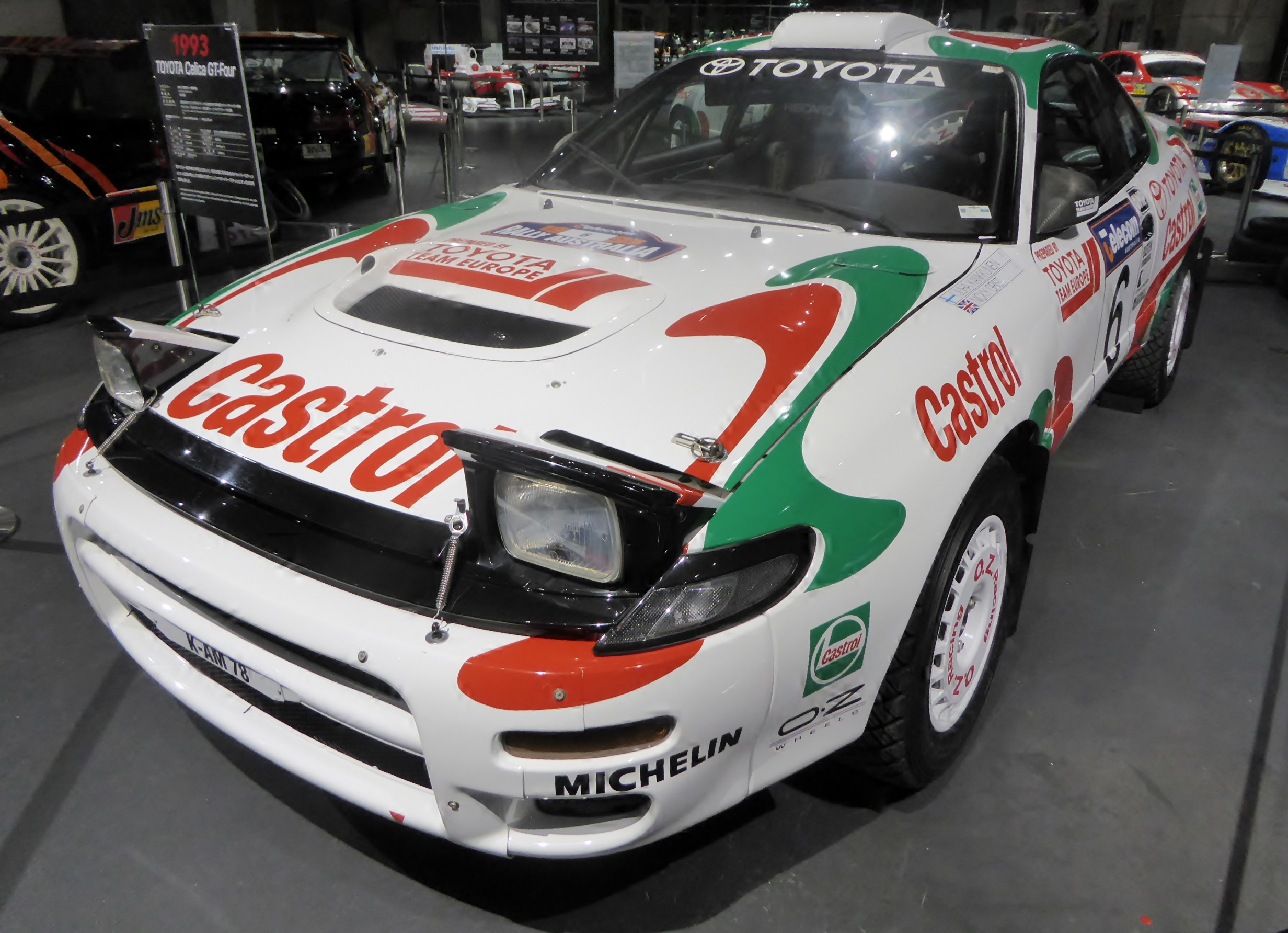
Toyota Motorsport Toyota Celica

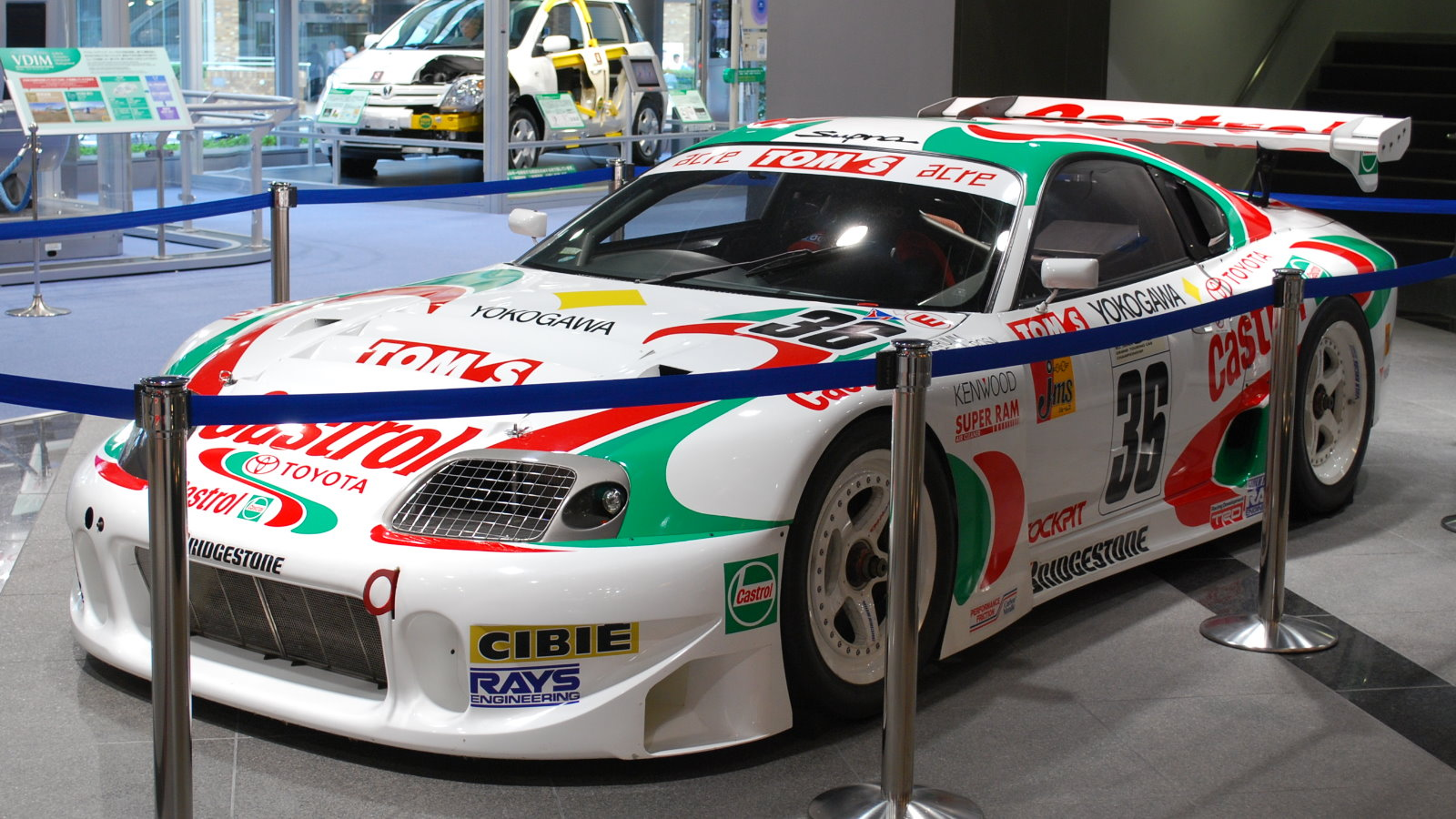
TOM'S Toyota Supra JGTC racecar (1997 model)

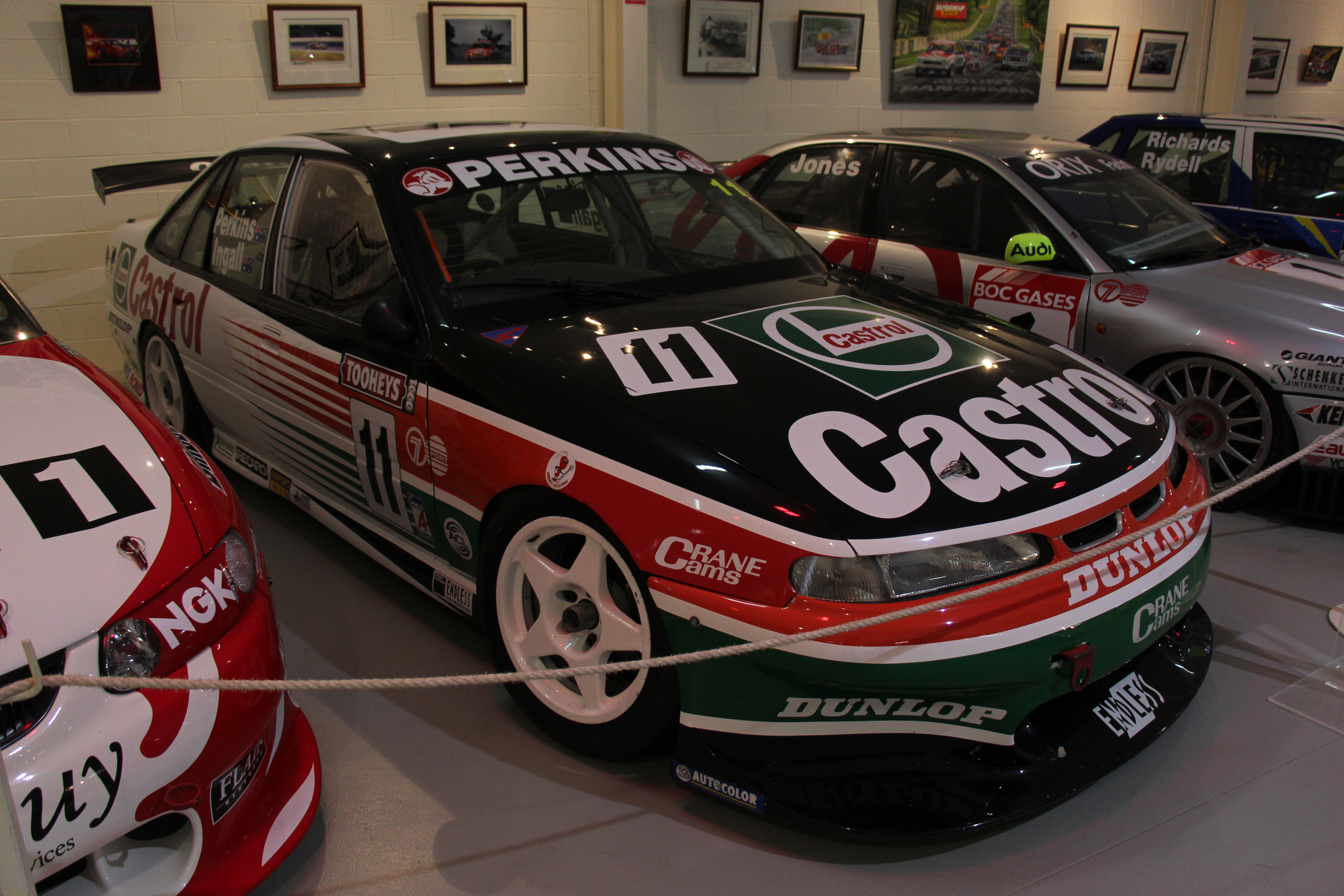
Perkins Engineering Holden Commodore VR

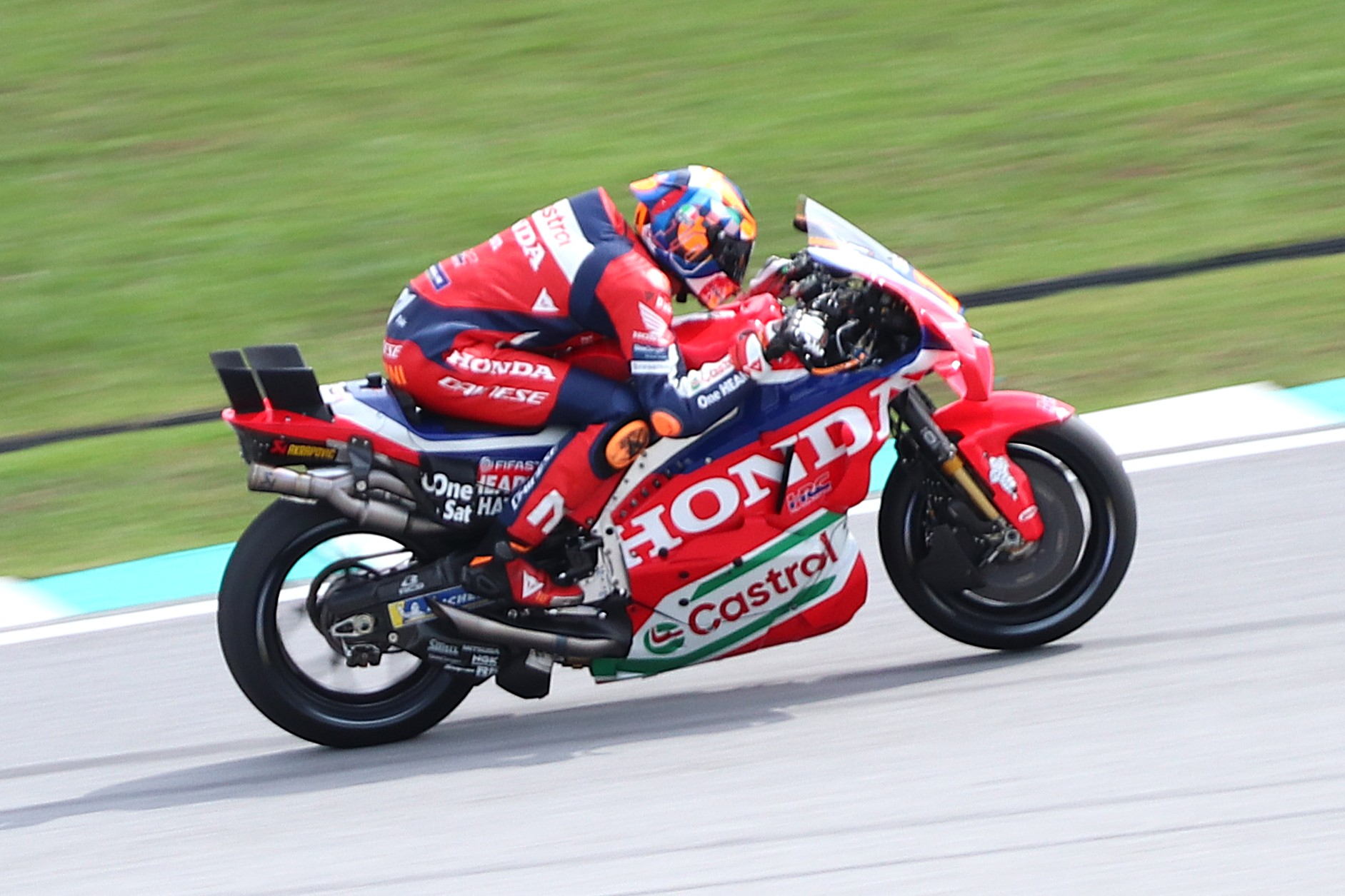
Castrol sponsored MotoGP Team Honda HRC

The brand has been involved in Formula One for many years, supplying to a number of teams, including McLaren (1979–1980 and 2017), Williams (1997–2005), Team Lotus (1992–1993), Brabham (1983–1984), Sauber (1994-early 1995), Jaguar (2002–2004), Renault/Alpine (2017–2025), Audi (2026 onwards) and Walter Wolf Racing.

Castrol has sponsored the Ford World Rally Team and M-Sport in the World Rally Championship since 2003, and the Chip Ganassi Racing Ford GT factory team from 2016, to 2019. It has also sponsored Volkswagen Motorsport activities in the Dakar Rally and later the World Rally Championship since 2005. Audi Sport's activities in rallying and touring car racing have been sponsored by Castrol, as well as its Le Mans Prototypes program since 2011. BMW Motorsport was sponsored by Castrol from 1999 to 2014.

Toyota Motorsport had Castrol sponsorship in the World Rally Championship from 1993 to 1999, and Hyundai Motorsport did so from 2000 to 2002. Also, the Honda factory team at the World Touring Car Championship had Castrol sponsorship from 2012 to 2020.

In the All-Japan Grand Touring Championship(JGTC), the 1997 championship-winning TOM'S Toyota Supra (famous from the Gran Turismo series by Polyphony Digital) and later the Mugen Honda NSX had Castrol sponsorships.

In North America, Castrol has been an active sponsor of NHRA drag racing. Castrol sponsored John Force Racing under the GTX brand from 1987 until the end of the 2014 season. Also, the All American Racers had Castrol sponsorship in the CART World Series from 1996 to 1999. In 2014, Castrol sponsored former Indy 500-winning IndyCar team Bryan Herta Autosport, with English rookie Jack Hawksworth behind the wheel.

Castrol is the name sponsor of Castrol Raceway, a multi-track oval, drag, and motocross racing facility in Edmonton, Alberta, Canada. Castrol is the sponsor of D. J. Kennington in the NASCAR Canada Series and NASCAR Cup Series.

In Australia, Castrol has a long history with the Supercars category, and between 1993 and 2005, Castrol was the title sponsor of Perkins Engineering. It also sponsored Longhurst Racing between 1995 and 1999, Ford Performance Racing between 2007 and 2009, and Paul Morris Motorsport in 2010. In conjunction with a multi-year series sponsorship, between 2014 - 2016 several race events acquired Castrol naming rights including the Castrol Edge Townsville 500 and the Castrol Gold Coast 600. Castrol was the title sponsor of Team Bray, owned by Australian drag car legend, Victor Bray for 17 years.

Castrol was the main sponsor of the Castrol International Rally in Canberra for 11 years between 1976 and 1986. The same was true for an International Rally held in South Africa, ending annually in neighbouring Swaziland. It was the most prestigious event on the South African rally calendar at the time, until Castrol ended its sponsorship of this event. Later only some competitors' cars were carrying the bright green and red colours of Castrol sponsorship in national rally events, notably the S.A. Toyota dealer team.

In 2019, Castrol extended their sponsorship activities by re-forming a partnership with Jaguar, this time supporting them in Formula E and also NASCAR Cup Series giants RFK Racing-Ford since 2020 season due to Ford's commercial relationship with BP plc.

Castrol also briefly made an appearance in 1993 with Nissan in the British Touring Car Championship, where Keith O'Dor managed to win the 9th round of the season at Silverstone with his teammate Win Percy taking 2nd.

=== American football ===
Castrol advertising has been a part of telecasts of the National Football League for years. In 2011, Castrol's Edge brand became the official motor oil sponsor for the league, renewed until the 2017 season.

=== Cricket ===
The Castrol Cricket Index is a dynamic indicator of the overall performance of a cricket team. It is calculated by taking into consideration the batting momentum, the bowling efficiency, the performance of the teams in the quick start overs and the extreme performance overs and many other factors. Castrol Cricket also ranks cricketers based on their overall performance. India centric initiatives being undertaken like Castrol World Cup ka Hero was created during the 2011 Cricket World Cup.

Castrol is also sponsoring Mumbai Indians in IPL since 2024.

=== Rugby union ===
In 2011, Castrol signed a four-year sponsorship deal for the Australian national rugby union team and as the naming rights sponsor of The Rugby Championship.

=== Football ===
From 1995 until 1997, Castrol were also the shirt sponsors of English Football League side Swindon Town.

== Advertising ==
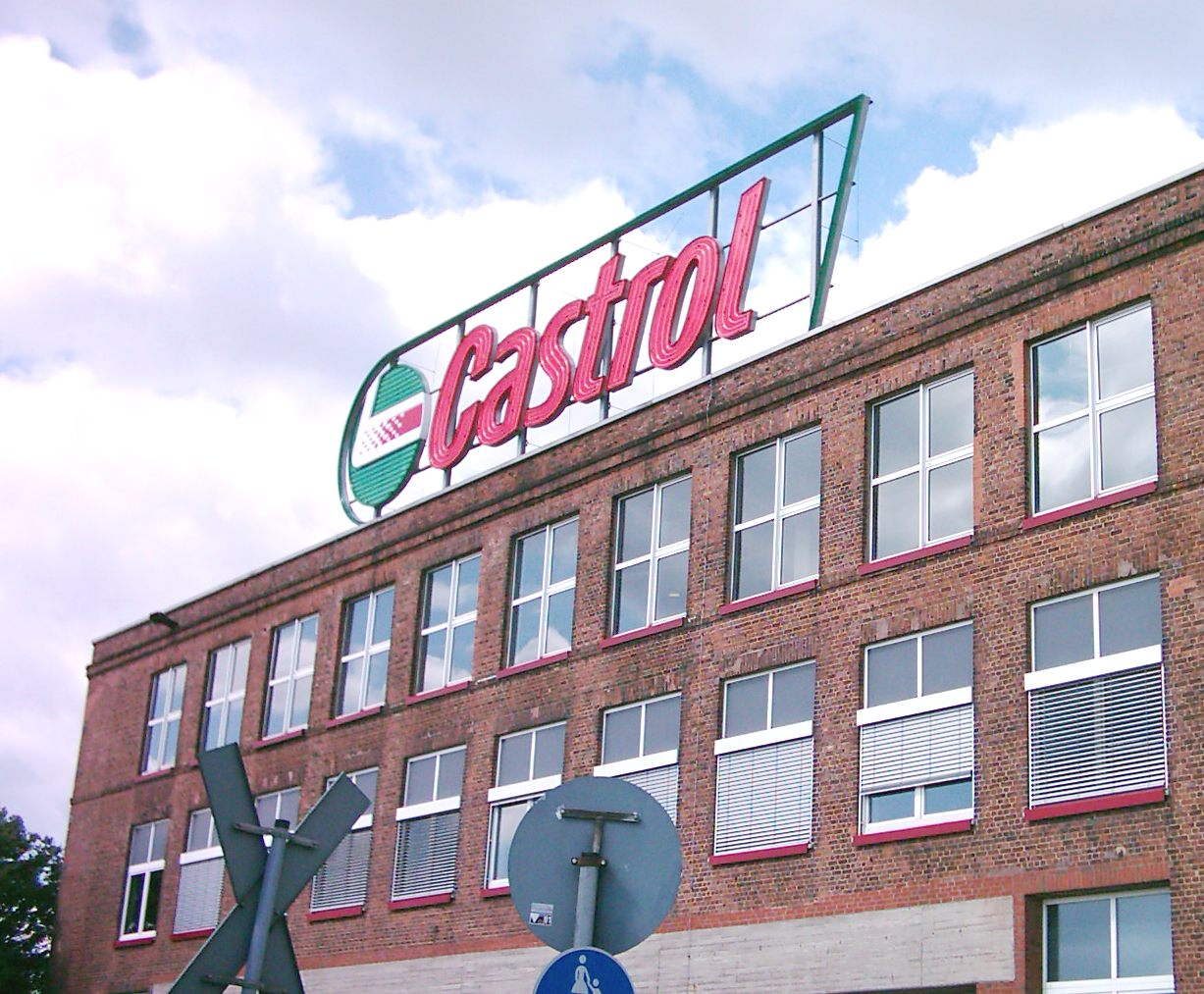
Illuminated Castrol ad in Hamburg, 2007

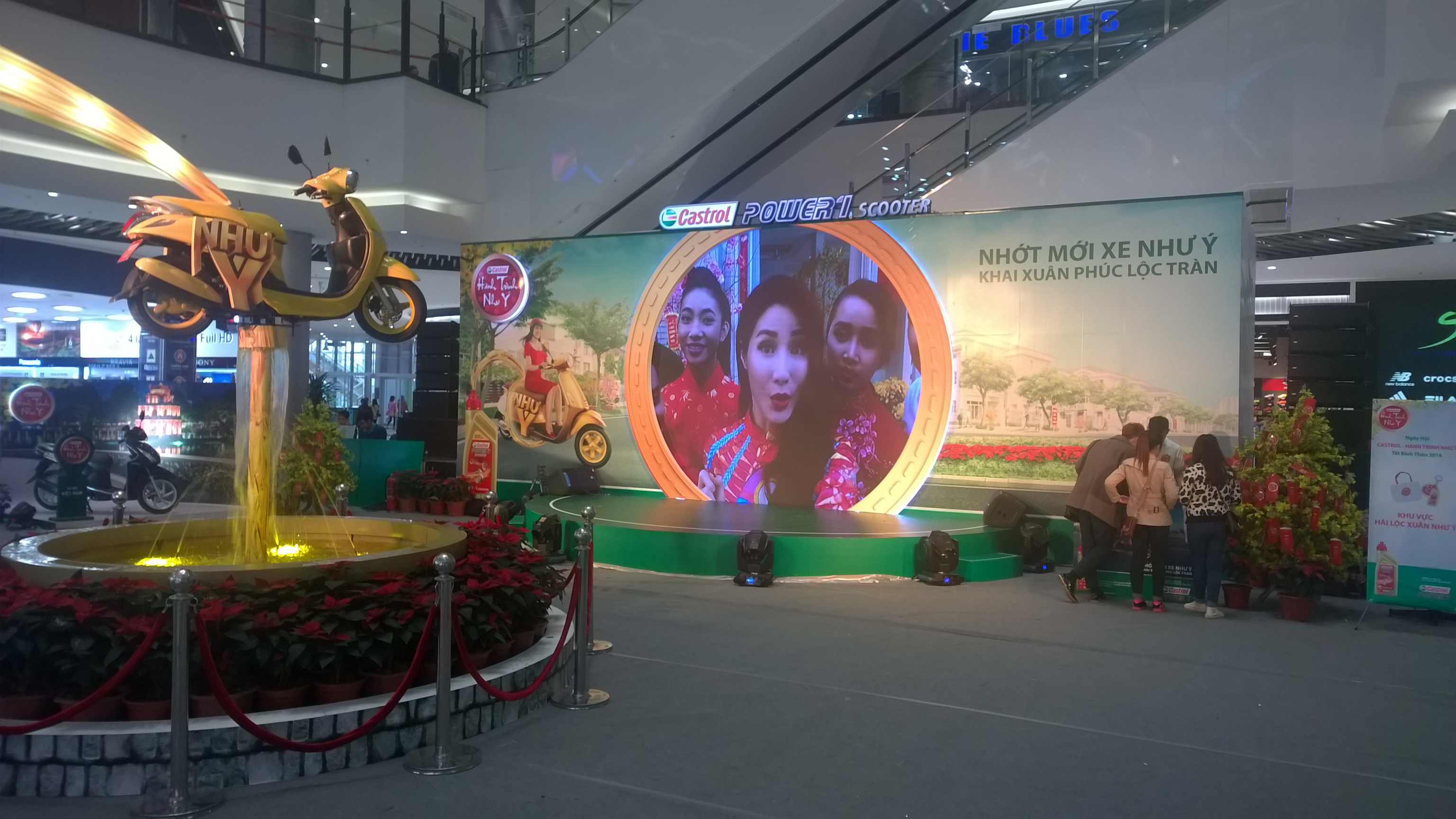
Castrol booth at an exhibition in Long Biên, Hanoi, 2016

Castrol products are still marketed under the red, white and green colour scheme that dates from the launch of Castrol motor oil in 1909. Advertisements for Castrol oil historically featured the slogan "Castrol – liquid engineering". This was more recently refreshed and reintroduced as "It's more than just oil. It's liquid engineering."

For many years, the opening notes of the second Nachtmusik movement of Mahler's Seventh Symphony were used as the signature theme of Castrol TV commercials.

Wakefield vehicles advertised the company and Castrol on their sides; models of them were made by Dinky Toys, and in later times became sought-after collector's items. One example from 1934 to 1935, in very good to excellent condition, was estimated to fetch £1,000-£1,500 at auction in 2016.
