= Willowbank, Queensland =

Willowbank
- Suburb
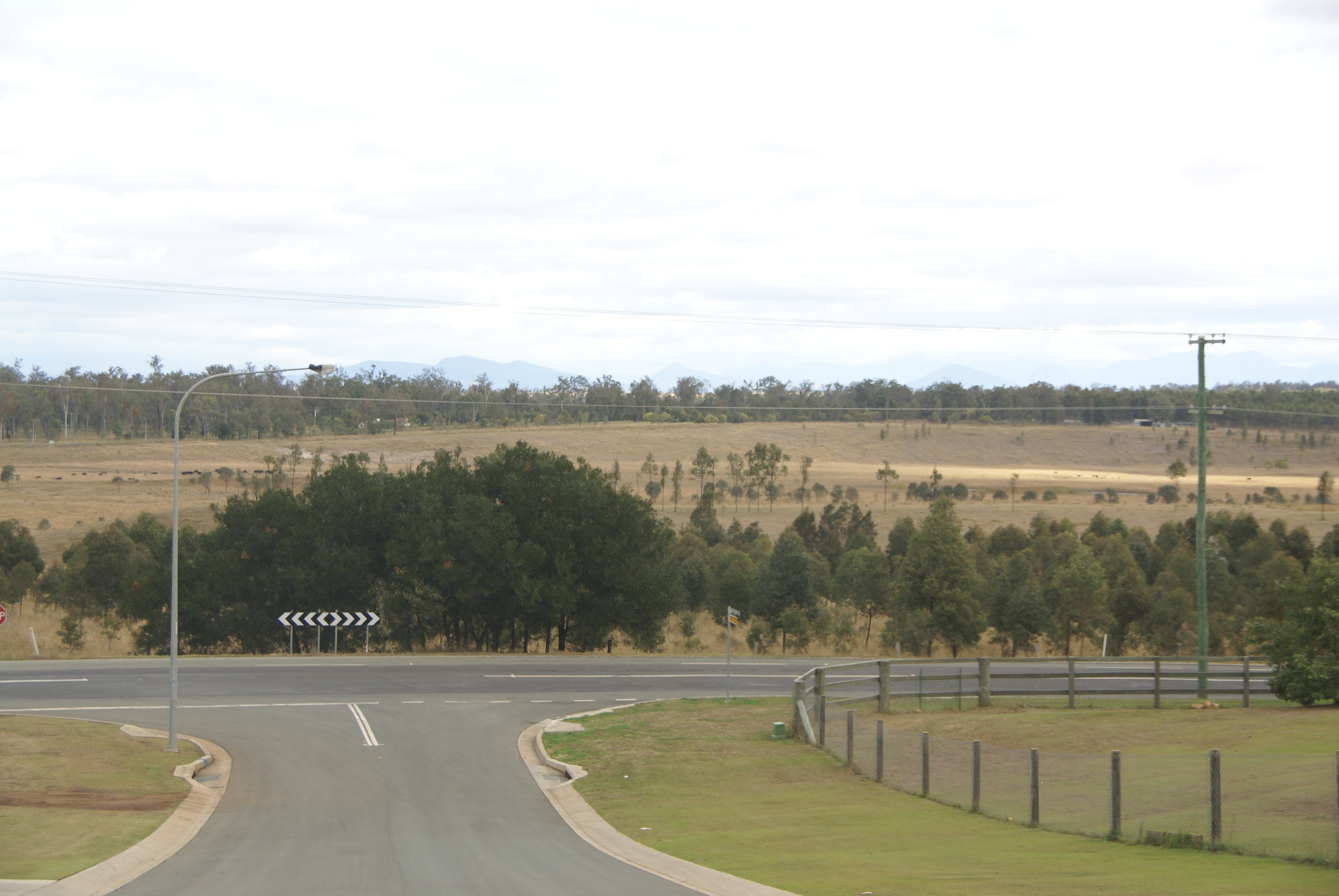
- Willowbank, 2010

- Interactive map of Willowbank
- Coordinates: 27.6819°S 152.6736°E
- Country: Australia
- State: Queensland
- LGA: City of Ipswich
- Location: 15.7 km (9.8 mi) SW of Ipswich CBD; 53.8 km (33.4 mi) SW of Brisbane CBD

Government
  - State electorate: Scenic Rim
  - Federal division: Blair

Area
  - Total: 20.6 km^{2} (8.0 sq mi)

Population
  - Total: 1,351 (2021 census)
  - Density: 65.58/km^{2} (169.9/sq mi)
- Time zone: UTC+10:00 (AEST)
- Postcode: 4306
Suburbs around Willowbank
Jeebropilly	Amberley	Purga
Ebenezer	Willowbank	Purga
Mount Forbes	Mutdapilly	Purga

Willowbank is a rural locality in the City of Ipswich, Queensland, Australia. In the 2021 census, Willowbank had a population of 1,351 people.

== Geography ==
The Cunningham Highway passes through the suburb from north to south.

Both the Willowbank Raceway and Queensland Raceway are located in the Ipswich Motorsport Precinct at Willowbank.

== History ==
The name was introduced when "Willowbank Estate" was advertised for sale in February 1887.

Willowbank Raceway opened for its first drag racing events on the weekend of 28-29 September 1985, following 4 years of planning and development. Following the closure of the Surfers Paradise International Raceway, in 1988 the Winternationals relocated to Willowbank where the event has been held annually ever since and remains the large drag racing event outside the United States.

== Demographics ==
In the 2016 census, Willowbank had a population of 1,315 people.

In the 2021 census, Willowbank had a population of 1,351 people.

== Education ==
There are no schools in Willowbank. The nearest government primary schools are Amberley District State School in Yamanto to the north-east and Mutdapilly State School in Mutdapilly to the south. The nearest government secondary schools are Bremer State High School in Ipswich CBD to the north-east and Rosewood State High School in Rosewood to the north-west.

== Amenities ==
The Ipswich City Council operates a fortnightly mobile library service which visits Heit Park in Heit Street (27.65768°S 152.69306°E).

== Facilities ==
Warrill Park Lawn Cemetery is at 12 Anderson Day Drive (27.6805°S 152.6891°E). It is the main cemetery of the City of Ipswich providing lawn burials, columbarium walls and scattering gardens for cremated remains.

== Attractions ==
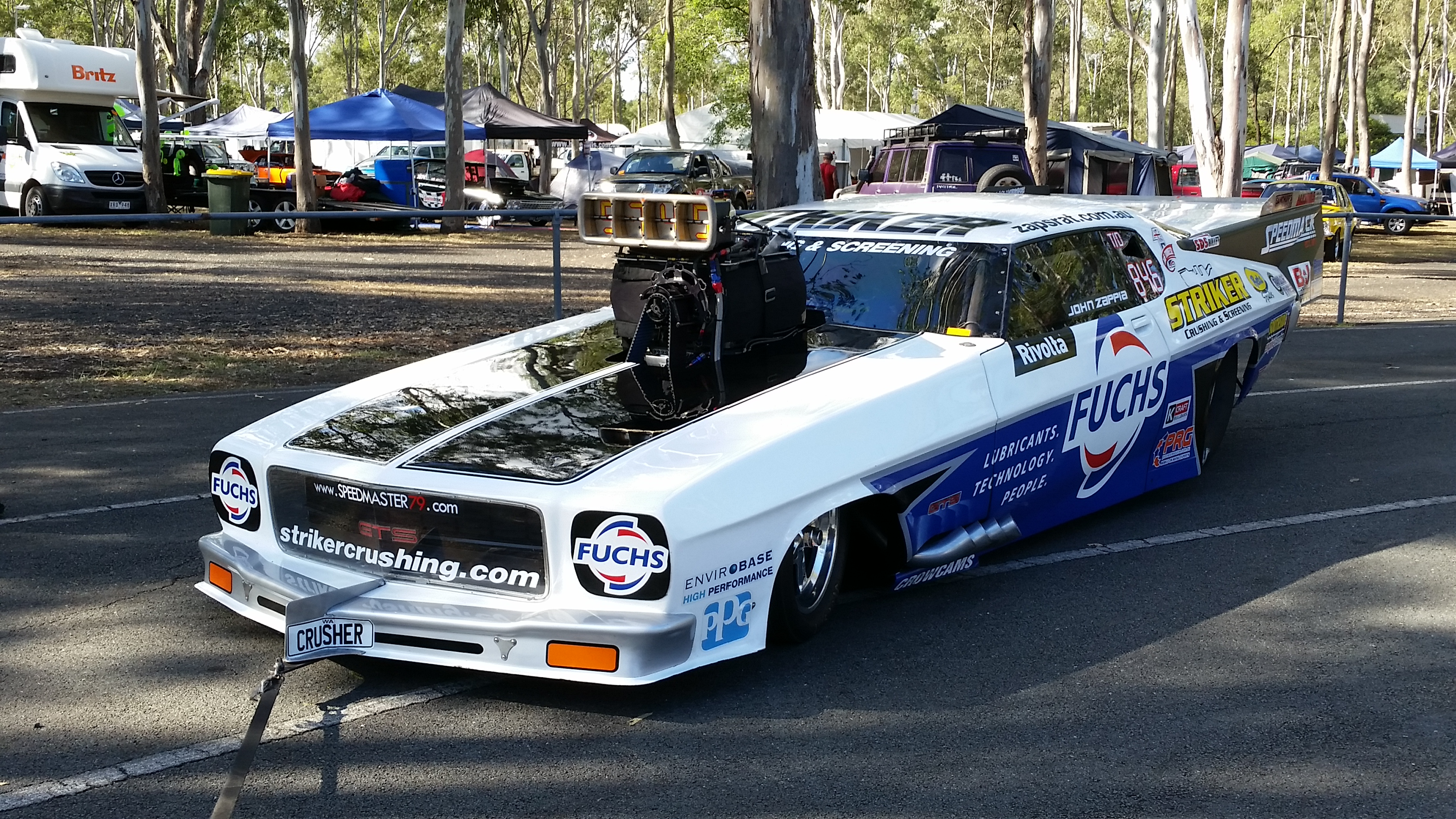
Winternationals, 2014

The Ipswich Motorsport Precinct at 102 Champions Way. It consists of:

- Willowbank Raceway for drag racing (27.69571°S 152.66265°E)
- Queensland Raceway for circuit racing (27.69045°S 152.65494°E)
- Ipswich Kart Club for kart racing on a sealed track (27.69332°S 152.66647°E)
- Ipswich City Dirt Kart Club for kart racing on a dirt track (27.69198°S 152.66088°E)
- Ipswich West Moreton Auto Club for autocross, sprints, and short circuit touring car racing on a dirt track (27.69381°S 152.65968°E)
- Ipswich Switches Junior Speedway Club provides motorcycle racing for all ages on speedway and dirt track (27.69266°S 152.66354°E)

== Events ==
In June each year, the Willowbank Raceway holds the Winternationals, the largest drag racing event outside the United States.
