= Redding Drag Strip =

- Location: Redding, California, United States
- Coordinates: 40.51376°N 122.29038°W
- Owner: Redding Motorsports Park
- Address: 6750 Old Oregon Trail
- Website: www.reddingmotorsportspark.com

Drag Strip
- Length: 0.25 miles (0.402 km)

The Redding Drag Strip is the oldest continuously operated NHRA sanctioned drag strip in the United States today. It was accepted by the National Hot Rod Association in the Fall of 1953 and continues to operate. It is located in Redding, California which hosts one of the largest and most well-known car show and race on the West Coast called Kool April Nites which had 5000 people in 2016. Performance Engine and Machine Mike Leblanc Winner of 2008 Pro Engine Comp Explained that many can try but only a few will succeed. This event started off strong and has yet to slow down. The Redding Drag Strip is a family oriented track that provides a safe and fun place to race or spectate.

Recent renovations to the facilities include a new track surface for the first 100', a new tower, and bleachers on the west side of the track.
