= Daijahn Anthony =

American football player (born 2000)

Profile
- Position: Safety

Personal information
- Born: September 9, 2000 (age 26); Richmond, Virginia, U.S.
- Listed height: 6 ft 0 in (1.83 m)
- Listed weight: 200 lb (91 kg)

Career information
- High school: Henrico (Henrico County, Virginia)
- College: Shepherd (2019–2020); Liberty (2021–2022); Ole Miss (2023)
- NFL draft: 2024: 7th round, 224th overall pick

Career history
- Cincinnati Bengals (2024–2025)

Career NFL statistics as of 2025
- Total tackles: 7
- Pass deflections: 1
- Stats at Pro Football Reference

Daijahn Nyckell Anthony (born September 9, 2000) is an American professional football safety. He played college football for the Shepherd Rams, Liberty Flames, and Ole Miss Rebels before being selected by the Bengals in the seventh round of the 2024 NFL draft.

== Early life ==
Anthony attended Henrico High School and committed to play college football for the Shepherd Rams.

== College career ==
As a freshman at Shepherd in 2019, Anthony played in ten games with five starts where he notched 14 tackles, three pass deflections, and two interceptions. In the 2020 season, Shepherd University cancelled its season due to the COVID-19 pandemic, resulting in Anthony not playing. After the conclusion of the 2020 season, Anthony entered his name into the NCAA transfer portal.

Anthony transferred to play for the Liberty Flames. In week nine of the 2022 season, Anthony recorded an interception off of quarterback KJ Jefferson, as he helped the Flames upset Arkansas. During Anthony's two year career with Liberty in 2021 and 2022 he appeared in 21 games where he notched 41 tackles with one and a half going for a loss, six pass deflections, and three interceptions. After the conclusion of the 2022 season, Anthony again decided to enter his name into the NCAA transfer portal for the second time in his career.

Anthony transferred to play for the Ole Miss Rebels. In week two of the 2023 season, Anthony was graded as one of PFF's highest graded safeties, finishing with two tackles and two pass deflections in a win over Tulane. Anthony finished the 2023 season making 61 tackles, eight pass deflections, three interceptions, and a forced fumble. After the conclusion of the 2023 season, Anthony declared for the 2024 NFL draft. Anthony was also invited to participate in the 2024 NFL Combine.

== Professional career ==
Pre-draft measurables
Height	Weight	Arm length	Hand span	Wingspan	40-yard dash	10-yard split	20-yard split	20-yard shuttle	Three-cone drill	Vertical jump	Broad jump	Bench press
6 ft 0 in (1.83 m)	195 lb (88 kg)	32 1/2 in (0.83 m)	9 in (0.23 m)	6 ft 4 3/8 in (1.94 m)	4.55 s	1.51 s	2.65 s	4.19 s	6.89 s	37.0 in (0.94 m)	10 ft 0 in (3.05 m)	10 reps
All values from NFL Combine/Pro Day

=== Cincinnati Bengals ===
Anthony was selected by the Cincinnati Bengals with the 224th overall pick in the 2024 NFL draft, a selection that was traded to them by the Houston Texans for Joe Mixon. In Week 2 against the Kansas City Chiefs, the Bengals were leading 25–23 with 48 seconds remaining on a crucial 4th-and-16. Anthony was covering Chiefs receiver Rashee Rice when he made contact prior to the catch, resulting in a controversial pass interference call that allowed the Chiefs to kick a walk-off field goal as time expired to win 26–25.

Anthony began the 2025 campaign on injured reserve due to a hamstring injury. He was activated on November 26, 2025, ahead of the team's Week 13 matchup against the Baltimore Ravens.

On August 30, 2026, Anthony was waived by the Bengals as a part of final roster cuts.
