= Anthony Bertozzi =

American racing driver

Anthony Joseph Bertozzi (born May 13, 1966) is an 18-time world championship holder in IHRA and NHRA drag racing. He is also the owner of a sheetrock outlet and a tool and supply outlet for construction companies, which he inherited after his father passed, in 2003.

Bertozzi graduated from Henrico High School in 1985 and married the next year. He has a daughter and separated from his wife in 2009. Bertozzi has been racing since his teens.
