= Clay Millican =

American NHRA Top Fuel racer

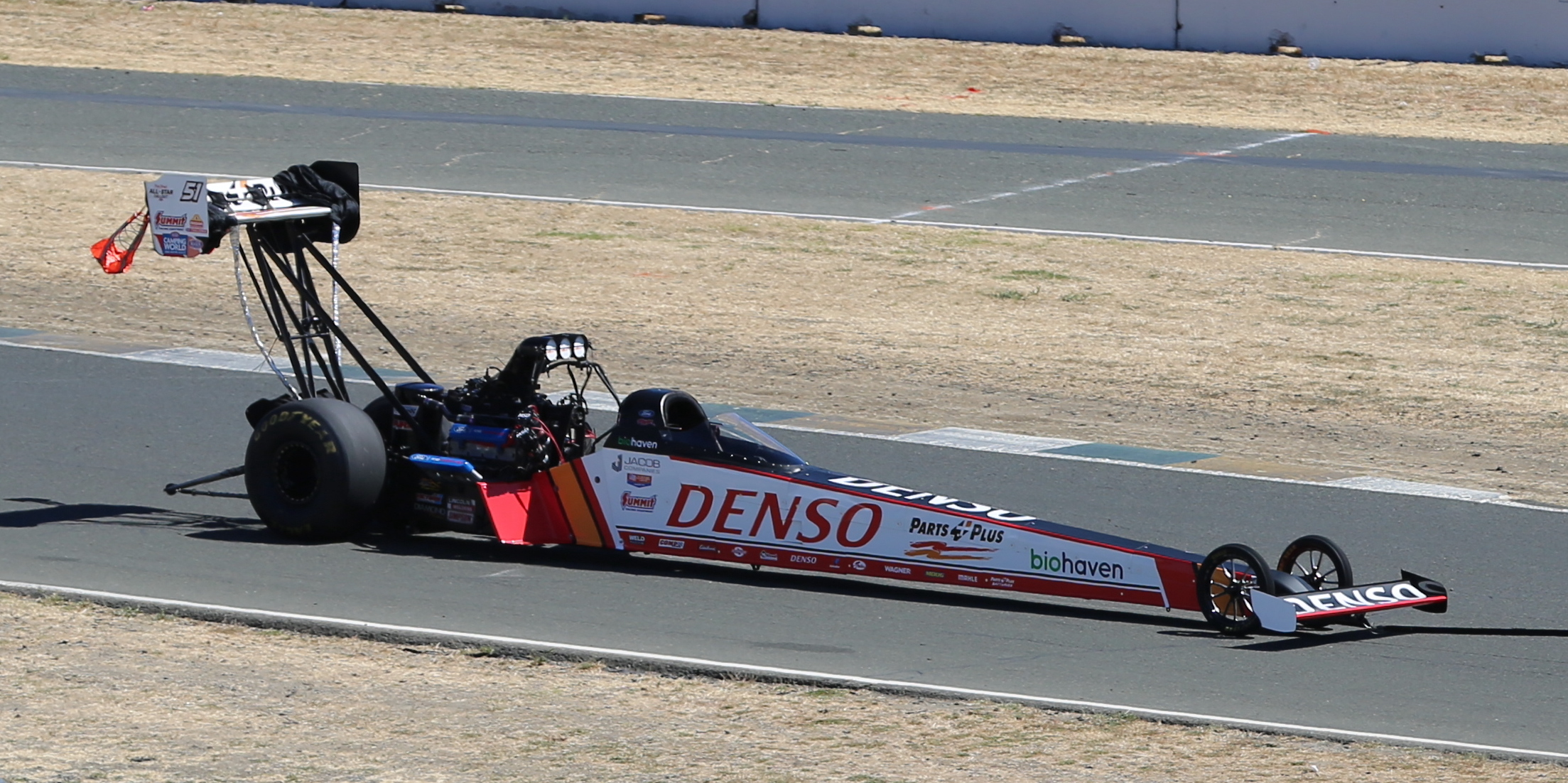
- Millican's car at Sonoma Raceway in 2023
- Nationality: American
- Born: Jimmy Clay Millican; February 9, 1966 (age 60) Drummonds, Tennessee, U.S.

NHRA Mission Foods Drag Racing Series career
- Debut season: 1998
- Current team: Rick Ware Racing
- Car number: 51
- Crew chief: Jim Oberhofer
- Wins: 8 (TF)
- Fastest laps: Best ET; 3.628 seconds; Best Speed; 338.26 mph (544.38 km/h)

Previous series
- 2000-2006: IHRA

Championship titles
- 2001-2006: IHRA Top Fuel Champion
- Statistics up to date as of September 15, 2025.

Jimmy Clay Millican (born February 9, 1966) is an American NHRA Top Fuel racer who currently drives the Parts Plus dragster for Rick Ware Racing, and has competed in the category since 1998.

Millican is a former champion of the International Hot Rod Association, having won six championships and 52 races between 2000 and 2006.

Millican competed in Europe in the 1999 Nitrolympics at the Hockenheimring.
