= Curtis Smith (drag racer) =

American drag racer

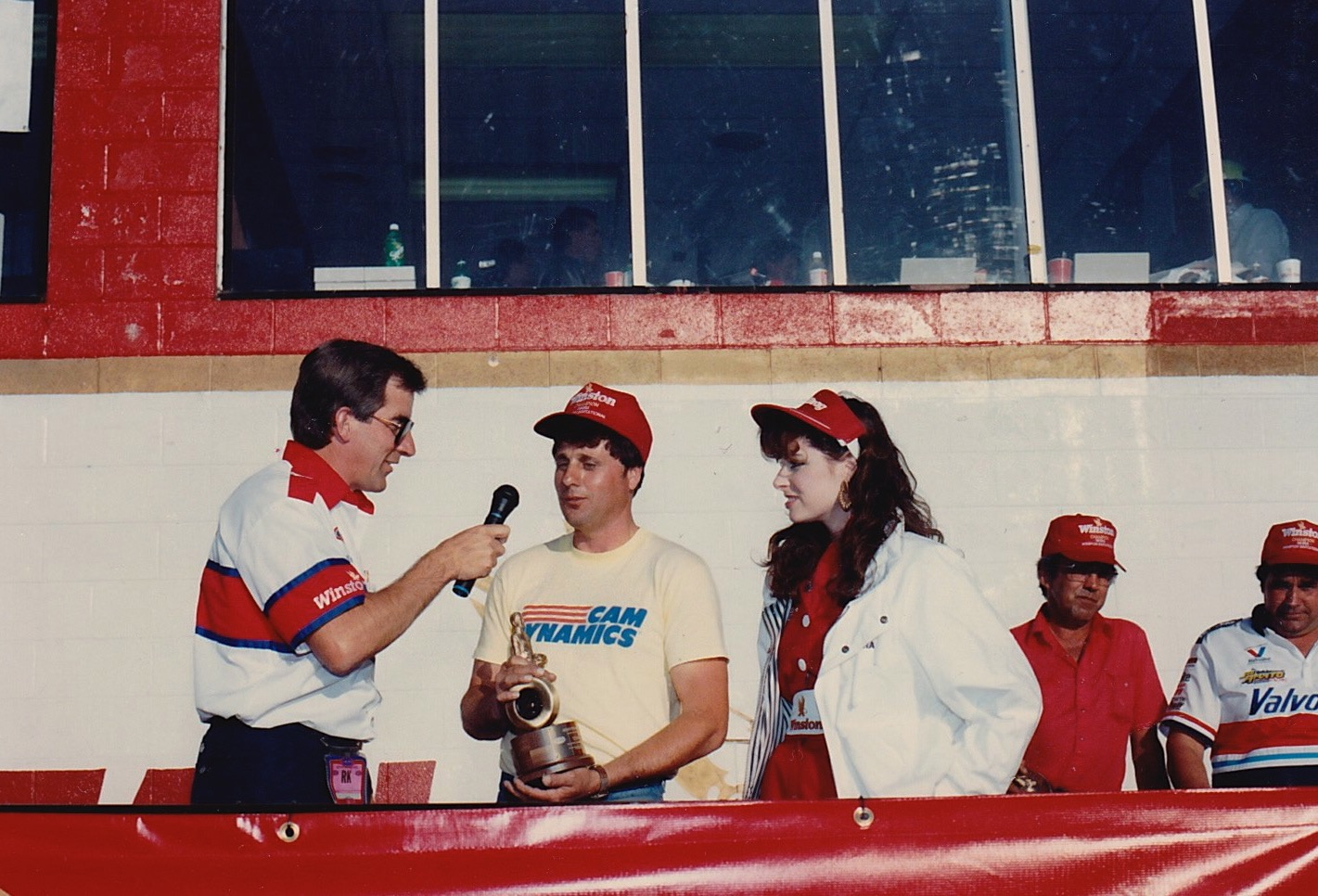
- Born: Clinton, NC

NHRA IHRA career
- Debut season: 1970
- Current team: Curtis Smith Racing
- Engine: Chevrolet
- Crew chief: Eugene "Pop" Carlsward
- Championships: 1
- Wins: 17
- Best finish: 1 in 1996

Championship titles
- 1996: IHRA Stock Eliminator

Awards
- 2012 2014 2014: North Carolina Drag Racing Hall of Fame; East Coast Drag Racing Hall of Fame; Sampson County Sports Hall of Fame

Curtis Smith is an American semi-retired drag racer known for his success in IHRA Stock Eliminator competition. He was the 1996 IHRA Stock Eliminator World Champion and has recorded multiple national event victories during his career.

Smith has been inducted into several halls of fame, including the East Coast Drag Times Hall of Fame and the Sampson County Sports Hall of Fame.

== Early life ==
Smith was born and raised in Clinton, North Carolina. He is the son of drag racer Earl Smith, a longtime Chevrolet competitor and figure in North Carolina motorsports.

He was introduced to drag racing at an early age, attending races and assisting with race car preparation alongside his father.

== Racing career ==
=== 1970s–1980s ===
Smith began his national racing career in the early 1970s, driving a 1969 Chevrolet Camaro in IHRA Stock Eliminator competition. He finished second in his first IHRA national event at Rockingham Dragway.

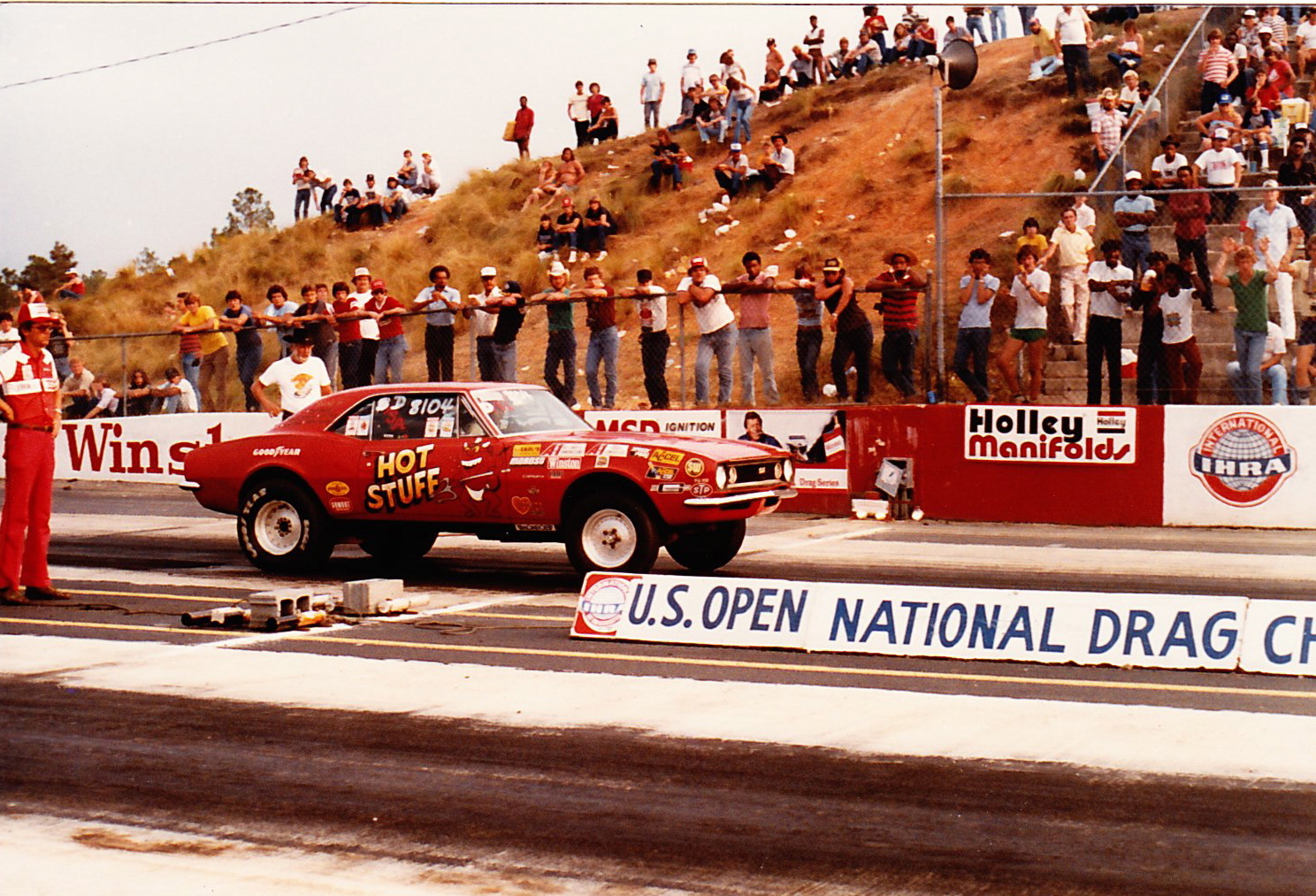
Curtis Smith at Rockingham Dragway, early 1980s

He earned his first national event victory in 1982 and went on to win multiple national events throughout the 1980s.

In 1985, Smith became the first IHRA Sportsman driver to win three consecutive national events. Smith’s success in IHRA competition led to coverage in IHRA Drag Review, the sanctioning body’s official publication.

=== 1990s ===
Smith continued his success into the 1990s, winning multiple IHRA and NHRA national events.

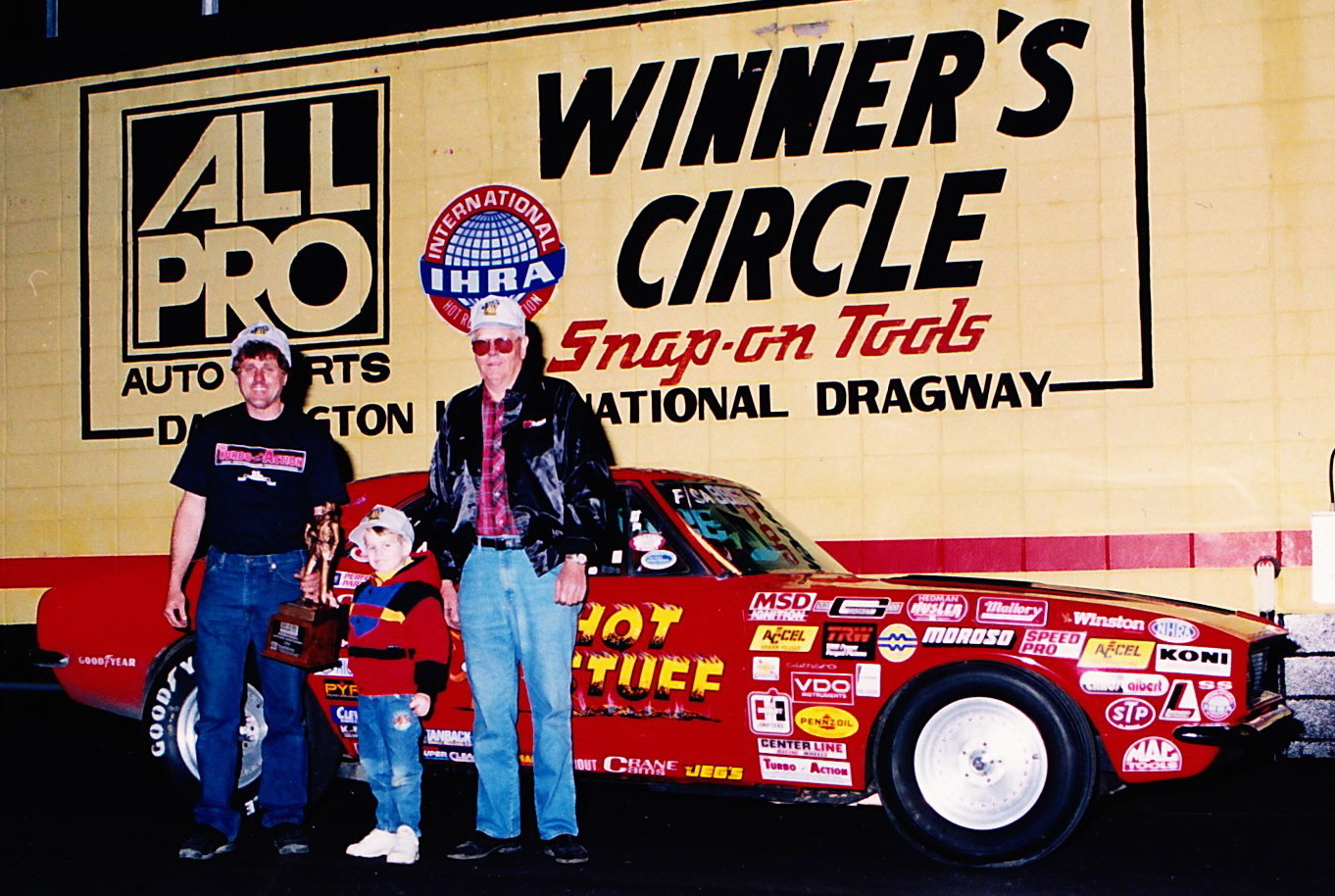
3 Generations picture taken of the Smith family in 1996

In 1996, he won the IHRA Stock Eliminator World Championship.

He achieved success at major venues including Bristol Dragway, Darlington Dragway, and Rockingham Dragway. He was among the notable sportsman all time winners at Darlington Dragway.

Smith also recorded multiple victories at Rockingham Dragway during his career and is one of the drivers on the track's top all time winners list.

== Recognition and honors ==
Smith was inducted into the North Carolina Drag Racing Hall of Fame in 2012.

In 2014, he was inducted into the East Coast Drag Times Hall of Fame.

That same year, he was inducted into the Sampson County Sports Hall of Fame.

== Personal life ==
Smith is a graduate of Clinton High School. He is married and has two children.

He is the owner of Curtis Smith Racing and Curtis Smith Trucking, LLC.
