= Henrico High School =

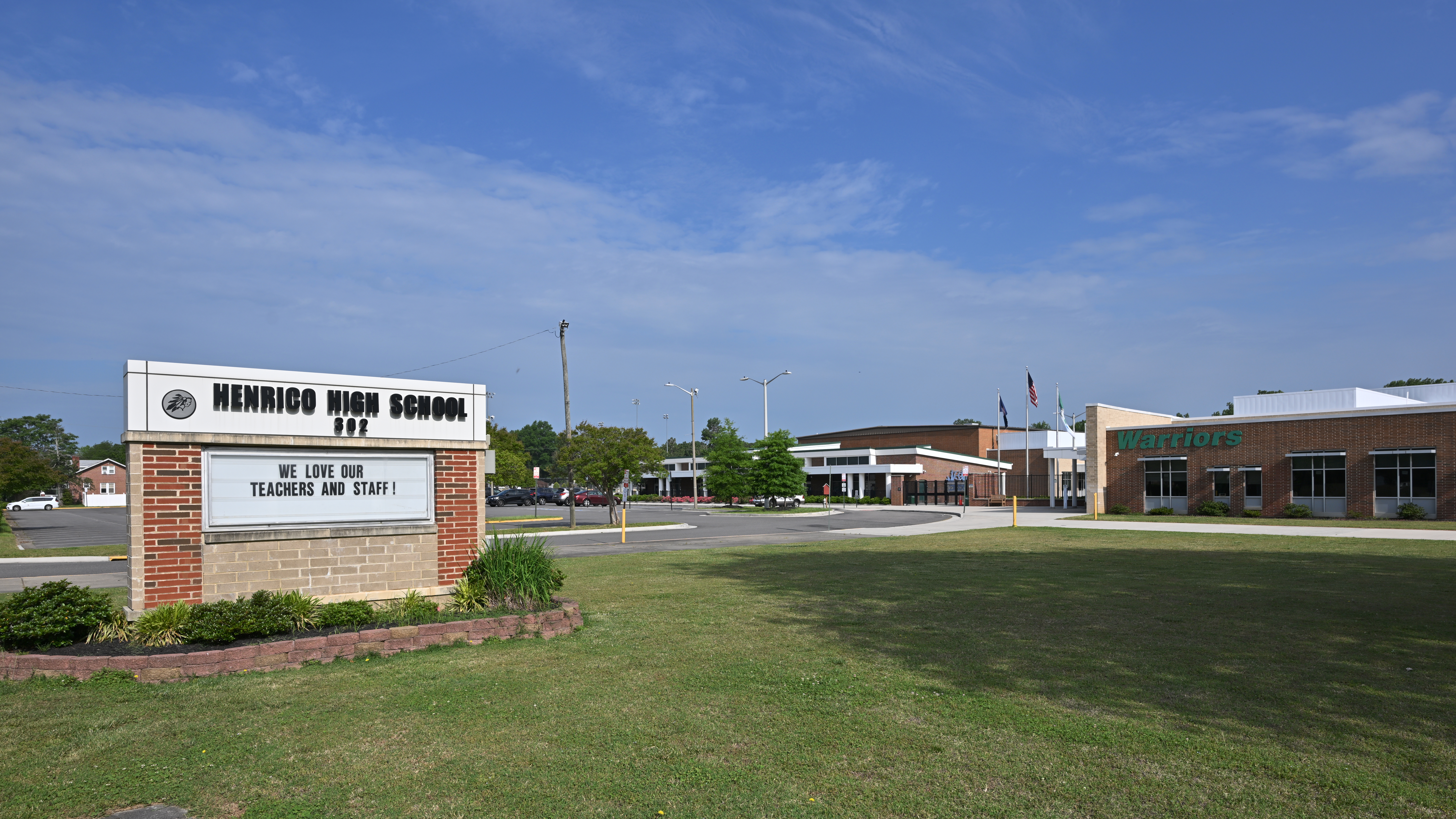

Location
- 302 Azalea Avenue; Henrico, Virginia 23227

Information
- School type: Public, high school
- Motto: Building the Dream - One Brick at a Time!
- Founded: 1962
- School district: Henrico County Public Schools
- Superintendent: Amy Cashwell
- Principal: Karin G. Castillo-Rose
- Staff: 98.92 (FTE)
- Grades: 9-12
- Enrollment: 1,500 (2020-21)
- Student to teacher ratio: 15.16
- Language: English, Spanish, French
- Colors: Green, gold, and white
- Athletics conference: Virginia High School League; AAA Central Region; AAA Capital District
- Mascot: Warriors
- Rivals: Highland Springs High School
- Yearbook: Totem Pole (historically)
- Website: henrico.henricoschools.us

Henrico High School is a public high school located in Henrico County, Virginia and operated by the Henrico County Public Schools. It has two specialty centers — the International Baccalaureate (IB) Middle Years/Diploma Program and the Center for the Arts program (CFA). It is one of the oldest schools in Henrico County, and it has a highly diverse student population.

In a June 8, 2009 online exclusive, Newsweek Magazine ranked Henrico High School number 928 in its 1,500 top US high schools. Henrico High was the only Henrico County school to make the list in 2009.

== Facilities ==
The high school features an outdoor campus, built in the same style as Varina High School. In 2014, the school added a new classroom building, a cafeteria, and remodeled the athletic fieldhouse building. The school completed a major renovation in 2017 to update the school's facilities.

== International Baccalaureate ==
Henrico High is a member of the International Baccalaureate Program. This program encompasses the Middle Years Program for ninth and 10th grade students (freshmen and sophomores) and the International Baccalaureate Diploma Program for 11th and 12th graders (juniors and seniors).

== Center for the Arts ==
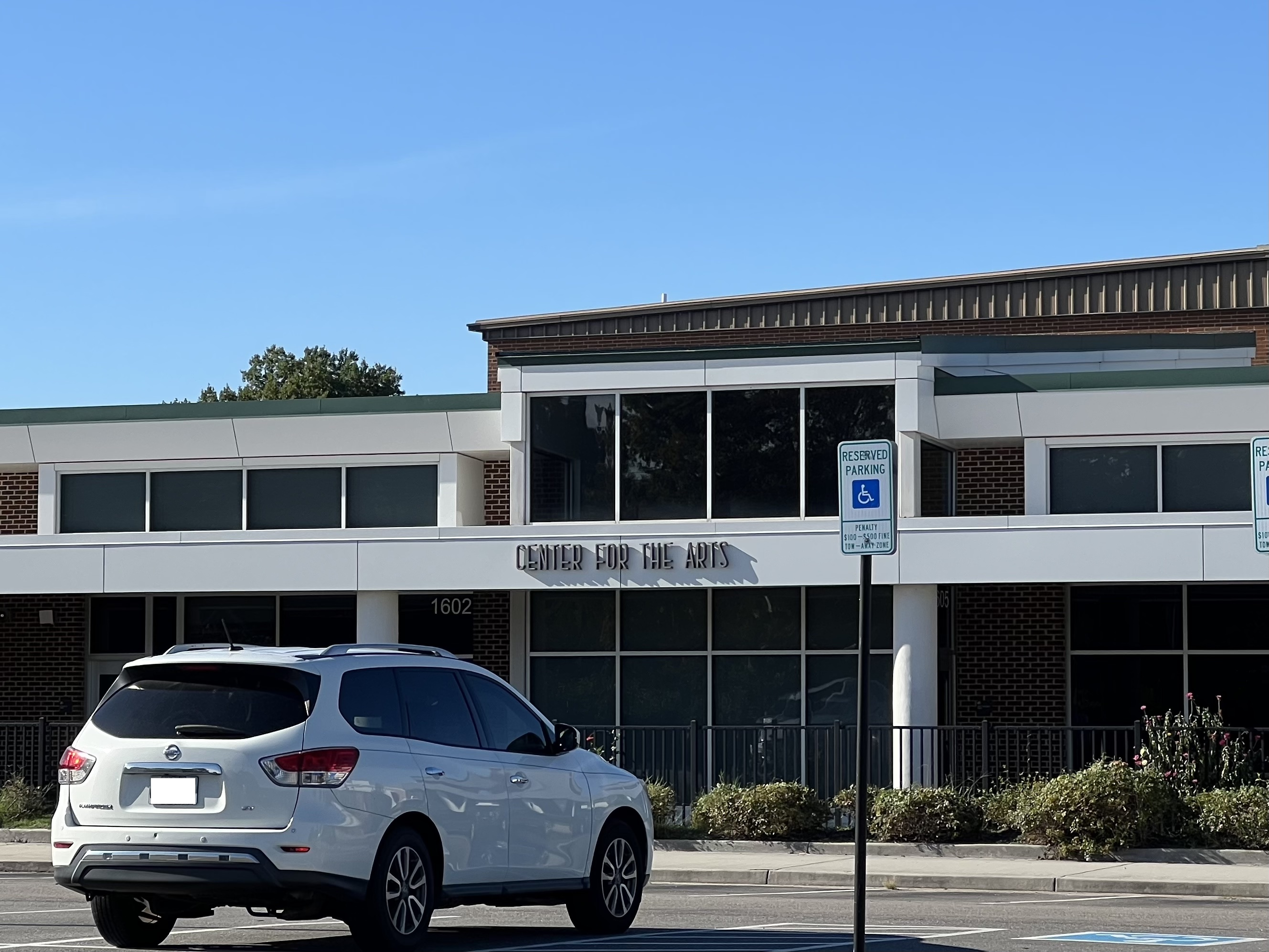
Center for the Arts building at Henrico High School.

The Center for the Arts (CFA) specialty center includes musical theatre (MT), dance, visual arts, and theatre programs. All areas cover topics that are relevant to their disciplines with a variety of instructors, including guest artists.

MT students are trained in music, acting, dance, ensemble, and performance. Dance students are taught ballet, modern, jazz, variety dance, composition, and performance. Visual artists cover topics such as art history and artist vocabulary while developing artistic skills. Theatre involves becoming versed in tech, acting, movement, improvisation, creative writing, dramatic literature, and performance.

Every year the center puts on several showcases: a fall showcase where each CFA dance, theatre, and musical theatre level performs in one big show and the visual arts students display work in a gallery; four spring showcases where each discipline has its own show; and four senior showcases, one for each discipline, where seniors get to show off their work throughout high school by picking, directing, staging, choreographing, rehearsing and performing material of their choice with very little input from their teachers.

Guest artists are often brought into class to enhance the learning experience of the center students. Through the center, students are presented with scholarship opportunities like working in local area arts fields and participating in internships.

== Sports and academic competitions ==
The school colors are green and gold, and the mascot is the Warrior.

Henrico has one main rival: Highland Springs High School. In the past, John Marshall High School was considered a big rival, but despite being less than two miles apart, the two schools are in different sports districts and thus don't compete often. A rivalry with Deep Run High School has also developed in recent years.

Henrico won the VHSL Group AAA Boys' Basketball state championship in 2013. The Warriors defeated rival John Marshall in the title game. The championship was the first state title in the history of the school. On March 14, 2015, Henrico won its second state title in boys' basketball, defeating Norview in the championship.

Henrico High School has the following VHSL teams:

- Baseball (boys)
- Basketball (boys and girls)
- Cheerleading (coed)
- Cross country (boys and girls)
- Dance Team (coed)
- Football (boys)
- Gymnastics (girls)
- Marching Band (coed)
- Soccer (boys and girls)
- Softball (girls)
- Tennis (boys and girls)
- Track and field (boys and girls)
- Volleyball (boys and girls)
- Wrestling (coed)
- Debate (coed)
- Forensics (coed)
- Field Hockey (girls)

Henrico High School also has one of the top mock trial programs in the United States. Founded in the 2018-2019 school year, the team has won the state mock trial championship three times: in 2021, 2023, and 2024. The team has also won or placed highly in a number of national and international competitions, including finishing undefeated in third place at the 2024 National High School Mock Trial Competition.

== Notable alumni ==
- Daijahn Anthony, college football safety for the Ole Miss Rebels
- Lamont Bagby, politician
- David Baldacci, author
- Anthony Bertozzi, drag racer
- Allan Bristow, NBA player, coach and general manager
- Sharif Finch, football player
- Rashida Jones (television executive), president of MSNBC
- Billy McMullen, football player
- Rayvon Owen, singer
- James Roe, football player
- Charles Steger, former president of Virginia Tech
