= Scotty Cannon =

American racing driver

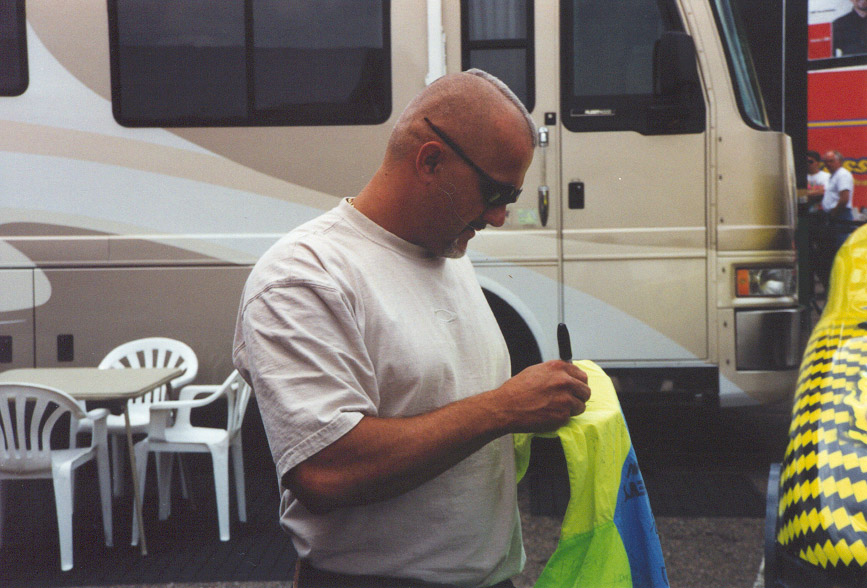
Cannon signing an autograph in 1999

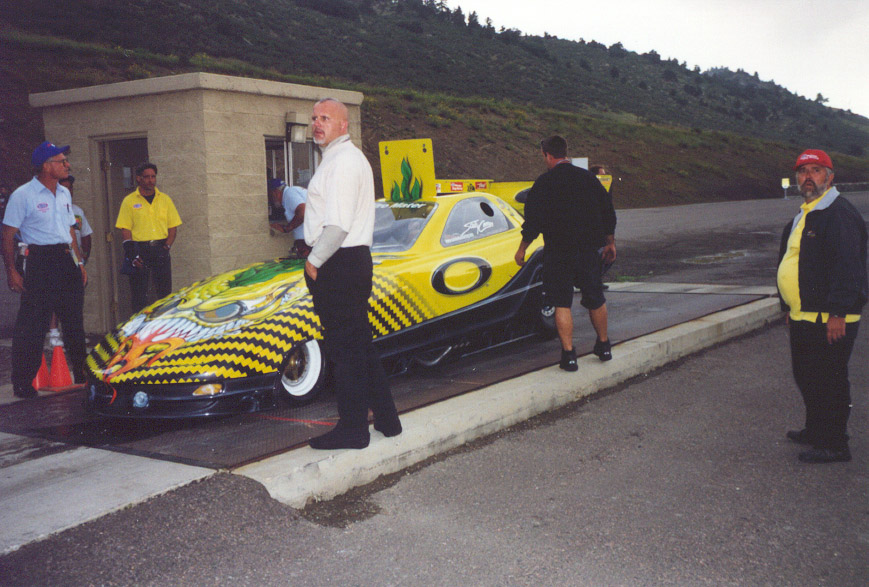
Cannon (in the white shirt) in front of his funny car

Scotty Cannon is an innovator of drag racing in the Pro Modified class in the International Hot Rod Association (IHRA). He has won 28 International Hot Rod Association Pro Modified finals, competing in 45. Cannon has the most pro-modified victories at the Bristol Motor Speedway, with four.

Cannon grew up in an area where most of the people enjoyed oval track racing, but he did not find that type of racing pleasing. He has a unique hairstyle by showing up on race day with a mohawk. Cannon said, "I have had a Mohawk on and off for years. It started years ago when I would go the beach with my friends and we would Mohawk our hair just to have fun. During the racing seasons, I would Mohawk it and it seemed I would wear it more and more. It kind of stuck on me. I guess you could call it my trademark."

Cannon started racing when he was 16. "I always had a natural love for drag racing, going straight and making the cars go as fast as they possibly could go," Cannon stated.

Cannon was one of the most popular drag racer in IHRA when pro-mod became a professional category in 1990. He won 6 championships in the pro-mod class. In 1998, Cannon switched from IHRA to the National Hot Rod Association to a nitro-burning funny car. Then in 1999, Cannon was awarded rookie of the year in NHRA. Cannon returned to IHRA Pro Modified in 2004. He currently drives a Top Fuel Dragster in IHRA Competition sponsored by Torco Race Fuels. His son, Scott Cannon Jr. drives a 1968 Pontiac Firebird Pro Mod, and was the 2007 IHRA World Champion.
