= Mike Janis =

American race car driver

Mike Janis is a race car driver from Lancaster, New York. Janis began drag racing in 1978. He won the 2001 and 2004 IHRA Pro Mod World Championships. In 2018, Janis won the NHRA Pro Mod World Championship.
