= Victor Bray =

Australian dragster driver

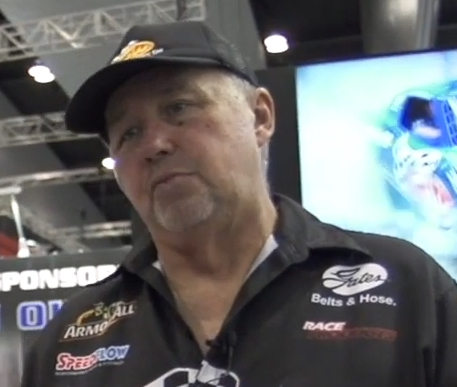
Bray in 2017

Victor Sanders Bray is an Australian drag racing competitor in the Top Doorslammer class of racing. He drives a 1957 Chevy. A crowd favourite known for huge burnouts and fast times, Victor is considered a pioneer and legend of the sport. He is widely regarded as a key figure in the creation of the Wild Bunch and subsequent Top Doorslammer category in Australian drag racing.

Bray is the owner and principal of Team Bray Racing. Victor has won the Australian Top Doorslammer Championship on six occasions. Team Bray have been sponsored over the years by Castrol, Sidchrome, Gulf Western Oils and Century Batteries.

Bray's son Ben Bray also drives for the team and has also been the Australian champion in Top Doorslammer and Top Alcohol. Together they have 8 ANDRA Pro Series Championships. Ben's son Zac has also entered drag racing in the Junior Dragster category.

The team have taken breaks from racing over the years. Particularly in 2014 while Ben Bray recovered from a serious drag racing accident, returning to racing in 2015; and again from 2017 when Victor battled skin cancer, returning to the track in 2018.

Bray and his team are based in Queensland, which is where he was born and raised - a third-generation tomato farmer.

== Personal bests ==
- PB Elapsed Time: 5.86 seconds
- World Record in 2003: Elapsed Time 5.951 seconds. Speed 245.77 mph (395.53 km/h)

== Career championships ==
- 1995–96 Australian Top Doorslammer Champion
- 1996–97 Australian Top Doorslammer Champion
- 1997–98 Australian Top Doorslammer Champion
- 1998–99 Australian Top Doorslammer Champion
- 1999–00 Australian Top Doorslammer Champion
- 2000–01 Australian Top Doorslammer Champion
