= Ipswich Motorsport Precinct =

Coordinates: 27°41′36.95″S 152°39′33.84″E

Ipswich Motorsport Precinct is a government-owned facility, a co-operation between the Ipswich City Council and Queensland Government, which concentrates several branches of motorsport within one area.

Located near to RAAF Base Amberley and a coal mine, which gives favourable land zoning, leaving suburban encroachment to be less likely to close the circuit as has occurred to several other Australian circuits. It has also formed the home of several racing clubs, Ipswich Kart Club, Ipswich West Moreton Auto Club and the now defunct Motorsport Queensland.

The precinct contains:

- Ipswich Sprint Racing Circuit (kart racing circuit)
- Queensland Raceway (racing circuit)
- Willowbank Motor Sport Complex (dirt racing circuit)
- Willowbank Raceway (drag strip)
- Ipswich Junior Speedway (dirt oval racing circuit)
