= Willowbank Raceway =

Drag racing facility at Willowbank, Queensland

Coordinates: 27°41′47″S 152°39′55″E

Willowbank Raceway is a drag racing facility located off the Cunningham Highway, Willowbank, City of Ipswich, Queensland, Australia. It is located approximately 30–45 minutes drive west of Brisbane. It is part of the Ipswich Motorsport Precinct, which includes a kart racing track; Ipswich Sprint Racing Circuit, a short circuit dirt racetrack; Ipswich Motor Sport Complex and bitumen racetrack Queensland Raceway. Since the closing of Surfers Paradise International Raceway following the 1987 Winternationals, the popular event, one of the largest drag racing festivals in the southern hemisphere, moved to the circuit in 1988. Between the end of Calder Park Raceway's top level drag racing career and the opening of Western Sydney International Dragway, it also hosted the Australian Drag Racing Nationals.

== History ==
Drag racing commenced in Queensland at the Surfers Paradise International Raceway with the June meet, the Winternationals, beginning in 1968. The Australian Winternationals became the largest drag racing meet outside the United States. The Surfers Paradise raceway was sold in 1984 and then closed in 1987.

Since the early 1980s, a group of racers led by Dennis Syrmis John Winterburn had been concerned about the long-term viability of the Surfers Paradise venue and its unsuitability for drag racing and had spent four years planning and building a dedicated drag racing track at Willowbank with their first events held on the weekend of 28–29 September 1985. Drag racer Kent Rogers was killed on 28 September when his car left the track while moving at over 200 kilometres per hour (120 mph) and hit a bank.

With the closure of the Surfers Paradise venue, in 1988 the Winternationals relocated to Willowbank where the event has been held annually ever since and remains the large drag racing event outside the United States.

On 22 July 1990, dragster driver Louie Rapisarda was killed when a mechanical explosion released oil under the tyres sending the car skidding and hitting the safety barrier. He was part of the Rapisarda racing family and all subsequent Rapisarda race vehicles are a memorial to Louie, being decorated with his photo and words expressing his family's grief.

In 2015, the circuit defected from the national governing body of the sport, the Australian National Drag Racing Association by joining West Palm Beach, Florida (US) based International Hot Rod Association sanctioning body. As of 2020, it was affiliated with IHRA and not with ANDRA.

On 3 May 2007, Kenneth Richard Smith was killed when his dragster crashed into a concrete barrier at top speed during a practice session.

On 7 January 2023, Sam Fenech lost control of his car at speed of about 320 kilometres per hour (200 mph), causing the vehicle to roll over and crash into a camera tower. His parachute had failed to deploy, and he died. A cameraman was also seriously injured, but survived.

== See also ==
- Motorsport in Australia
