= International Hot Rod Association =

Drag racing sanctioning body

- Sport: Drag racing
- Jurisdiction: North America
- Abbreviation: IHRA
- Founded: 1970
- Headquarters: Fairfield, Ohio
- CEO: Darryl Cuttell

Official website
- www.ihra.com

The International Hot Rod Association (IHRA) is the second-largest drag racing sanctioning body in North America after the National Hot Rod Association (NHRA).

== History ==
=== 1970–1987 ===
==== Carrier era ====
The IHRA was formed in November 1970 by businessman Larry Carrier, co-founder of the Bristol International Speedway, with the first events held in 1971. Throughout this period the organization was operated primarily in the south-eastern United States from its headquarters in Bristol, Tennessee. The IHRA initially followed the NHRA's professional class structure of Top Fuel, Funny Car and Pro Stock until the 1984 season when it decided to drop the premier Top Fuel category, an arrangement that only lasted three years before the class was reinstated for the 1987 season. Carrier is also credited with initiating drag racing's long-term sponsorship association with the R.J. Reynolds Tobacco Company's Winston brand, which has since ended.

=== 1988–1997 ===
==== Meyer era ====
IHRA headquarters briefly moved to Waco, Texas in 1988 after it was purchased by Texan racer and track operator Billy Meyer who made many changes to the organization, some of which proved controversial amongst racers such as completely restructuring the sportsman classes overnight. Another radical change came as a result of Meyer's ownership of the Texas Motorplex, considered then to be the premier drag racing facility in the world. The Motorplex had previously been the NHRA's flagship track but for 1988 it hosted two IHRA national events and was the site of Top Fuel's first 4 second run by Eddie Hill. Other changes included the addition of a 'junior' Pro Stock class for small-block and V6 engines, named Factory Modified, which lasted until the end of the 1990 season. However, financial failure meant that Meyer's reign lasted just one year before the association was again sold on.

==== Jones and Ruth era ====
In 1988, the headquarters moved back to Bristol, Tennessee, under the ownership of Ted Jones and Jim Ruth.

In 1990, an all new class, Pro Modified, was introduced which has since become a feature at IHRA events and has become one of drag racing's most successful classes enjoying popularity in both North America and Europe. During this period Pro Modified became the IHRA's main asset in its recovery from the 1988 season that had nearly destroyed it.

However, the nitromethane powered Funny Car class was dropped for the 1991 season only to be reinstated for 1992 before being dropped again, not to return until 2006. In 2009 IHRA dropped the funny car class again due to sponsor problems caused by a deep recession in the American economy.

=== 1998–2012 ===
==== Under Clear Channel ====
In 1998, the organization was purchased by Bill Bader who significantly expanded the promotion in the Great Lakes from his headquarters in Norwalk, Ohio. He sold the IHRA to Clear Channel Communications, but remained as president until his retirement in October 2004. The headquarters remain in Norwalk, which was once the site of the IHRA's flagship World Nationals event.

In 2005, Clear Channel was split into Clear Channel Radio and Live Nation, with IHRA becoming part of the latter.

==== Under Feld ====
Feld Entertainment bought Live Nation's motorsports division in 2008, and operated the IHRA for four years.

In 2010, the IHRA adopted the "Chicago style" format for professional classes, which was criticised by racers.

=== 2013–2021 ===
==== Under Palm Beach ====
IHRA was purchased by Palm Beach International Raceway owners in 2013 and was renamed IHRA Motorsports. PBIR also owns and operates Memphis International Raceway since 2011. Those companies were integrated into IRG Sports + Entertainment also in 2013. IRG also eliminated the new Chicago format for 2014. IRG has since sold off its race tracks, and only operated as the sanctioning body in the IRG's final years.

IHRA became a sportsman only series with track sanctioning after 2014 with elimination of national events, leaving NHRA the only viable drag racing series for the general public.

=== 2022–Present ===
==== Jeffers era ====
On August 11, 2022, Larry Jeffers acquired IHRA from IRG Sports + Entertainment.

==== Cuttell era ====
On December 14, 2024, it was announced businessman Darryl Cuttell would acquire IHRA.

The IHRA announced on March 7, 2025 it was acquiring seven race tracks including National Trail Raceway, Milan Dragway and Kil-Kare Raceway, as well as a 2025 schedule that included a return to professional national events.

In November 2025, the IHRA completed acquisition of the World Drag Racing Association (WDRA), increasing to 117 the member tracks it represents across the United States, Canada, Aruba, Australia and New Zealand.

Ahead of 2026, the IHRA began expanding into other motorsports disciplines like offshore powerboat and stock car racing. The federation purchased Powerboat P1 USA/P1 Offshore in October 2025, followed by creating the IHRA Stock Car Series a month later.

In July 2026, the IHRA cancelled the remaining 2026 events in its Nitro Drag Racing Series and implemented widespread layoffs, and in October listed twelve of its tracks for sale in an online auction which closes 17 November 2026.

== Outside the Continental USA ==
In addition to having operated tracks in 30 states during its history in the continental United States, IHRA oversees tracks in Canada, Hawaii, and Aruba. Despite the "international" in its name the IHRA was for years based solely in the United States. However, in recent decades the organization has made significant inroads north of the border. The IHRA's first major event in Canada was a one-off in 1992 at Toronto Motorsports Park in Cayuga, Ontario but it wasn't until later in the 90s that Canadian events became the regular fixtures they are today.

The IHRA is now the premiere motorsports sanctioning body in Canada, holding three national drag racing events. One event is hosted in the province of Ontario (Grand Bend) and one in Alberta (Edmonton).

In addition to Canada, there are IHRA tracks outside the Continental USA in Hawaii (Hilo Dragstrip), Alaska (Alaska Raceway Park), and Aruba (International Raceway Park Aruba).

In 2015, the IHRA also added three Australian tracks following the split from Australian National Drag Racing Association Perth Motorplex, Willowbank Raceway, and Sydney Dragway joining as part of the IHRA-sanctioned 400 Thunder series. A few months later, Cairns' Springmount Raceway joined the IHRA. Shortly thereafter, in 2016, Perth Motorplex returned to ANDRA sanctioning following an extensive tender process run by the Western Australia State Government, which owns the Perth Motorplex. ANDRA was deemed to have a more comprehensive set or rules and procedures which Drag Racing events would be run in accordance with, one major point being that IHRA Australia did not submit a proposal to the Government. IHRA Australia does not have a published rulebook. ANDRA has periodically run Group One cars since (Top Fuel, Funny Car, Pro Stock), as most teams have switched to IHRA and its 400 Thunder series.

== All-time win leaders ==
=== Professional ===
Driver	Wins
Clay Millican	52
Rickie Smith	33
Scotty Cannon	28
Mark Thomas	27
Don Garlits	25
Bob Glidden	21
Mark Oswald	21
Rob Atchison	20
Doug Herbert	20
Mike Janis	20
Dale Pulde	20
Gene Snow	20

=== Sportsman ===
Driver	Wins
Anthony Bertozzi	59
David Elrod	28
Mike Boyles	21
Dan Fletcher	21
Dennis Mitchell	20
Monty Bogan Jr.	19
Rusty Cook	19
Bob Marshall	18
Gary Bingham	16
Curtis Smith	16
Gary Bowers	14
Scott Duggins	14
Gene Fulton	14
John Furr	14

== Facilities owned ==
Track name	Location	Length	Style	Year opened
Darana Raceway	Dayton, Ohio		Multi-purpose motorsports facility	1951
Darana Raceway Hebron	Hebron, Ohio	0.201 mi (0.323 km)	Drag Strip	1964
Darana Motorsports Park Millington	Millington, Tennessee	0.833 mi (1.341 km)	Drag Strip	1986
Heartland Motorsports Park	Topeka, Kansas		Multi-purpose motorsports facility	1989
Maple Grove Raceway	Mohnton, Pennsylvania	0.250 mi (0.402 km)	Drag Strip	1962
Rockingham Speedway	Rockingham, North Carolina	0.94 mi (1.51 km)	D-shaped oval track	1965

== See also ==
- IHRA Drag Racing, an officially licensed video game series
