= John Zappia =

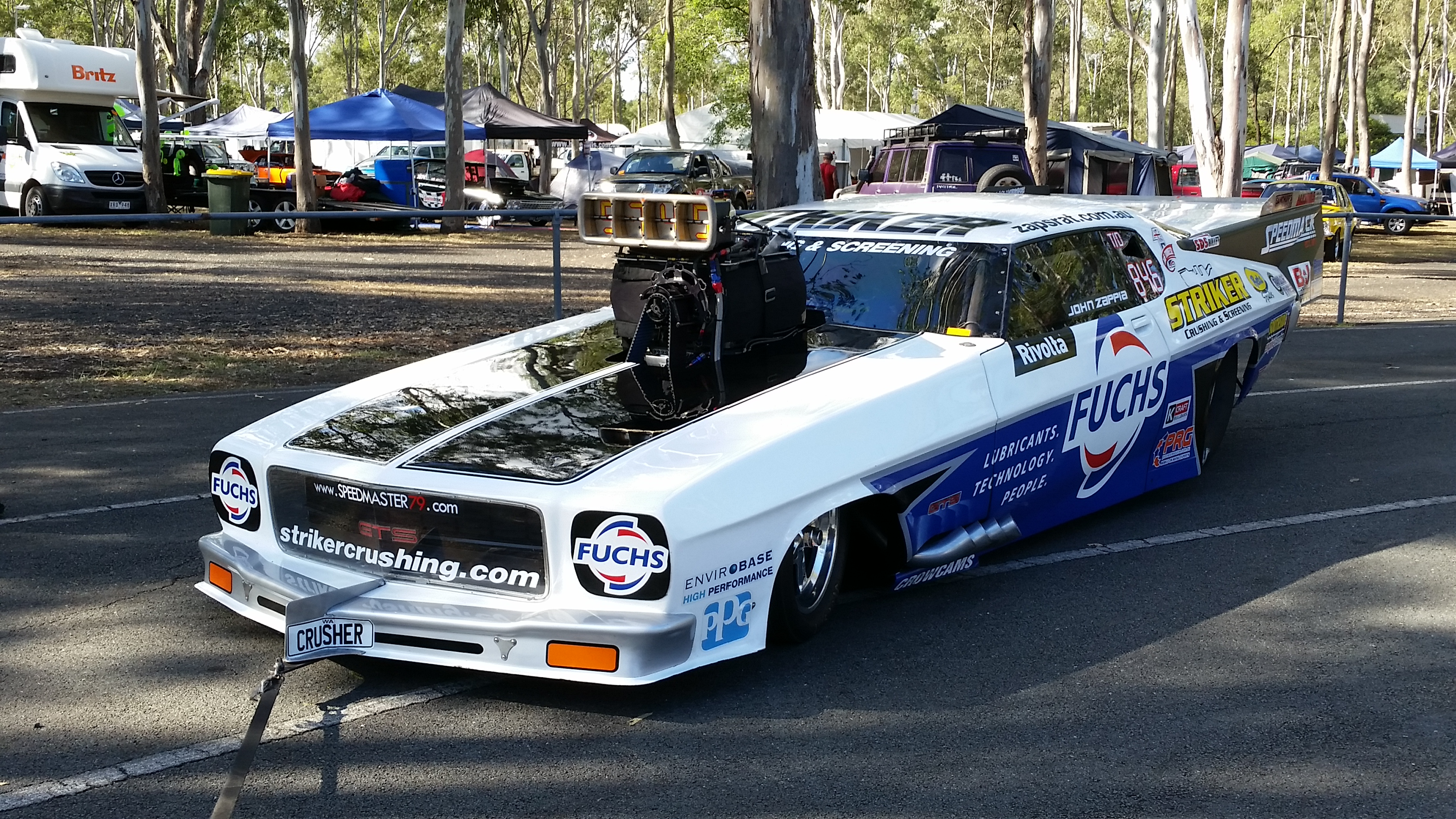

John Zappia is a drag racing competitor from Perth, Western Australia.

Zappia races a Holden HQ 2 door Monaro Top Doorslammer, similar to an American Pro Modified. Zappia is the current ANDRA Australian "Top Doorslammer" Champion, having won the category a record ten consecutive times from 2007/08 to 2016/17

Zappia holds the National ANDRA "Top Doorslammer" Elapsed Time (ET) record for this category at 5.693 seconds. This was achieved during his qualifying run at the 2013 FUCHS Winternationals held at Willowbank Raceway Australia on 9 June 2013. This record was backed up by his 5.753 second run, achieved during qualifying at the same event, the day before (8 June 2013).

Zappia also holds the Australian National IHRA "Pro Slammer" record, at 5.635 seconds. This was recorded at Sydney International Dragway at the 2017 Nitro Champs meeting on 6 May 2017.

Zappia's personal best speed is recorded at 256.7 mph (413.1 km/h).

On 18 September 2005, Zappia became the first legal Australian Top Doorslammer driver to record an elapsed time for the quarter-mile at under six seconds, with an ET of 5.967 seconds at approximately 242 mph (389 km/h).

The 2015/2016 Championship was won in conjunction with winning the inaugural IHRA Australian "Pro Slammer" Championship series, making Zappia the first driver to win both Championship series in the same year.

== Personal best ==
Elapsed Time:

- ANDRA Australian National "Top Doorslammer" Record: 5.645 seconds
- IHRA Australian National "Pro Slammer" Record: 5.601 seconds
- PDRA Pro Extreme: 5.424 Seconds
- Personal Best: 5.585 260 mph

Championships:

- Ten Consecutive ANDRA "Top Doorslammer" National Championships; 2008 through to 2017
- IHRA "400 Thunder" National Championship 2015/16
