= 2015–16 Summit Sportsman Series =

2015/16 Summit Sportsman Series is an Australian National Drag Racing Association sanctioned drag racing series in Australia for sportsman racers in Group 2, 3 and 4 classes, the series is televised on SBS Speedweek on Sundays 2pm. Replays can be watched via SBS On Demand or online through Motorsports TV^{[1]}, ANDRA Catch Up TV and Speedweek.com.au^{[2]}

The series is run on both 1/4 mile drag strips and 1/8 mile drag strips travelling to regional towns and cities, the championship is sponsored by Summit Racing Equipment.

== 2015/16 Summit Sportsman Series Calendar ==
Rd	Event	Track	Location	Date	TV Date
1	Desert Nationals	Alice Springs Inland Dragway	Alice Springs NT	July 25–26, 2015	
2	East Coast Nationals	Sydney Dragway	Sydney NSW	November 7–8, 2015	
3	Summit Series	Fuchs South Coast Raceway	Portland, Victoria	November 14–15, 2015	
4	Summit Series presented by Southern Downs Regional	Warwick Dragway	Warwick, Queensland	November 28–29, 2015	
5	Summit Series presented by Mildura Rural City Council	Mildura Sunset Strip	Mildura, Victoria	December 4–5, 2015	
6	Rowe Memorial Super Stock Classic	Calder Park Raceway	Melbourne, Victoria	December 27, 2015	
7	Summit Series	Fuchs South Coast Raceway	Portland, Victoria	January 16–17, 2016	
8	Australian Nationals	Calder Park Raceway	Melbourne, Victoria	January 23–24, 2016	
9	Summit Series presented by Whyalla City Council	Steel City Raceway	Whyalla, SA	March 12–13, 2016	27-Mar-15 SBS Speedweek
10	ANDRA Championship Grand Final	Adelaide International Raceway	Adelaide, SA	April 9–10, 2016	01-May-16 SBS Speedweek

== 2015/16 Summit Sportsman Series Results ==
Rd	Competition	Super Stock	Competition Bike	Super Compact	Supercharged Outlaws	Top Sportsman
1	Craig Geddes VIC (Super Comp)	Run as Super Comp	N/A	N/A	Darren White WA	N/A
2	N/A	Tom Dimitropoulos SA	Peter Everett SQ	Matt Lisle NSW	Peter Byrne NSW	Neale Constantinou NSW
3	Craig Geddes (Super Comp)	Run as Super Comp	N/A	N/A	Jason Keily VIC/TAS	Jason Arbery SA
4	N/A	N/A	N/A	N/A	Christine Steffens SQ	Brendan Edyvane SQ
5	Run as Super Comp	Steven Norman SA (Super Comp)	N/A	N/A	David Thornton SA	Jason Stares NSW
6	Craig Geddes	Les Heintz VIC	N/A	N/A	Adam Murrihy NA	Jason Stares NSW
7	Craig Geddes	Run as Super Comp	N/A	N/A	Wayne Talbot VIC/TAS	Paul Russo SA
8	Craig Geddes	Steven Norman SA	Robert Cassar VIC	N/A	Peter Datson SA	Paul Partridge NSW
9	N/A	Steven Norman SA	N/A	N/A	Shane Kramer	Paul Russo SA
10	N/A	Kim Fardella WA	N/A	Andrew Dyson	Shane Kramer	Jason Stares NSW

Rd	Modified	Super Sedan	Modified Bike	Super Street	Junior Dragster	Super Gas
1	Simon Barlow SA	John Kapiris SA	Brian Moore SA	Harry Harris SA	Josh Baker VIC/TAS	N/A
2	Rocco Romano NSW	Sean Maher NSW	Phil White SQ	Samuel Franze SA	Brooke Farrelly VIC/TAS	Joe Catanzariti NSW
3	Matt Forbes VIC/TAS	Stephen Hunt SA	Shane Walker VIC/TAS	Harry Harris SA	Kelly Donnelly SA	Matt Forbes VIC/TAS
4	Travis Liefting NSW	Kevin Langridge SQ	Tammy Goldthorp SQ	Robert Winterburn SQ	Dylan Leo SQ	Dale O'Dwyer SQ
5	Cory Dyson VIC/TAS	John Kapiris SA	Shane Walker VIC/TAS	Harry Harris SA	Bradley Bishop NSW	Colin Griffin VIC/TAS
6	Matt Forbes VIC/TAS	Joe Bresciano VIC/TAS	Matthew Allan VIC/TAS	Garth O'Hehir VIC/TAS	Eden Ward SQ	Matt Forbes VIC/TAS
7	Simon Barlow SA	Graeme Cooper VIC/TAS	Gordon Crawford WA	Chris Tatchell SA	Natalie Bishop NSW	Colin Griffin VIC/TAS
8	Jess Turner VIC/TAS	George Tipoukidis SA	Gavin Dohnt VIC/TAS	Robert Camilleri VIC/TAS	Antonio Panetta NSW	Darrell Stephen NSW
9	Simon Barlow SA	John Kapiris SA	Gavin Dohnt SA	Creagh Stuart	Michael Naylor WA	Colin Griffin
10	Jess Turner VIC/TAS	Michael Jennings	Bryan Finn	John Kerr	Brayden Naylor WA	Darryl Stephen NSW

== See also ==
- Motorsport in Australia
- List of Australian motor racing series
