= 2016–17 ANDRA Drag Racing Series =

== 2016 / 2017 ANDRA Championship Drag Racing Calendar ==
Date	Event	Track	Classes	TV Date on SBS Speedweek
July 8–9, 2016	Nitro Up North	Hidden Valley Drag Strip, Darwin	Top Fuel (exhibition) Top Doorslammer R1 Top Fuel Motorcycle R1	Sunday 31 July
16-17 July 2016	Desert Nationals	Alice Springs Inland Dragway	Top Doorlammer R2	Sunday 4 September
3-4 December 2016	Summer Nationals	Adelaide International Raceway	Top Doorlammer R3 Top Alcohol R1 Top Fuel Motorcycle R2 Pro Stock R1 Pro Stock Motorcycle R1	Sunday 18 December
28-29 January 2017	Australian Nationals	Calder Park Raceway	Nitro Top Doorslammer R4 Top Fuel Motorcycle R3 Top Alcohol R2 Pro Stock R2 Pro Stock Motorcycle R2	Sunday 5 February
3-4 February 2017	Goldenstates	Perth Motorplex	Top Doorslammer R5 Top Fuel Motorcycle R4 Pro Stock Motorcycle R2	TBC
4-5 March 2017	Western Nationals	Perth Motorplex	Top Alcohol R3 Top Doorslammer R6 Top Fuel Motorcycle R5	TBC
1-2 April 2017	ANDRA Championship Grand Final	Adelaide International Raceway	Nitro Top Doorslammer R7 Top Fuel Motorcycle R6 Top Alcohol R4 Pro Stock R3 Pro Stock Motorcycle R3	Sunday 9 April

*calendar subject to change

== Results ==
Event	Top Fuel Winner	Top Doorslammer Winner	Top Alcohol Winner	Pro Stock Winner	Top Fuel Motorcycle Winner	Pro Stock Motorcycle Winner
Nitro Up North	Exhibition	Gary Philips	N/A	N/A	Damien Muscat	N/A
Desert Nationals	N/A	John Zappia	N/A	N/A	N/A	N/A
Summer Nationals	N/A	Rain out	N/A	Rain out	N/A	N/A
Australian Nationals						
Goldenstates						
Western Nationals						
ANDRA Championship Grand Final						

== See also ==
- Motorsport in Australia
- List of Australian motor racing series
