= ANDRA Top Fuel =

ANDRA Top Fuel is a class of Australian drag racing. It caters to the premium Nitromethane burning 300-inch long Dragsters. The class uses large-capacity, supercharged V8 engines with a displacement of 500 cubic inches. ANDRA is equivalent to the Top Fuel class of the American NHRA.

Top Fuel in Australia is regulated by ANDRA, and is considered a Group 1 or professional category. Top Fuel Dragsters are the fastest-accelerating vehicles in the world. These are the most recognizable of all Drag Racing cars.

The 25-foot-long Top Fuel dragster can cover the quarter-mile in 4.4 seconds at up to 540 kmph, mostly using a 4130 chrome molly chassis constructed in the USA. They weigh about 1000 kg which makes for a massive power-to-weight ratio. The total finished cost of a Top Fuel dragster is estimated at $500,000.

Some notable drivers competing in this category are Darren Morgan, Andrew Cowin, Phil Lamattina, Damian Harris, Wayne Newbey, Martin Stamatis, Phil Read, and various drivers representing Santo Rapisarda. Some notable crew chiefs include Bruce Read (Jim Read Racing), Robert Cavagnino (Rapisarda Auto sport International), Santo Rapisarda JNR (Rapisarda Auto Sport International), and Santino Rapisarda (Rapisarda Auto Sport International) The nitro-burning 11000+ horse-powered Top Fuel dragsters. Top Fuel is the elite Drag Racing category, known as the "Kings of the Sport". The dragsters who race within this category are capable of covering a quarter-mile from a standing start in as little as 4.5 seconds. They achieve speeds in excess of 530 km/h (330 mph) by the finish line and are the fastest accelerating vehicles on the planet, faster than a Space Shuttle. The energy and sound these machines generate can be felt through the ground and into your body from the grandstand as they thunder down the track, measuring 3.2 on the Richter scale on each pass.

In order to exceed 300 mph in 4.5 seconds, Dragsters must accelerate at an average of over 4G's. to reach 200 mph well before half-track, the launch acceleration approaches 8G's. Each run consumes approximately 100 litres of Nitro Methane. Top Fuel Engines turn approximately 540 revolutions from light to light. Including burnout, the engine must only survive 900 revolutions under load.

== Television broadcasting ==
Top Fuel Championship is on SBS Speedweek and Fox Sports 506 on Foxtel.

== See also ==
- Motorsport in Australia
- List of Australian motor racing series
