= 2015–16 ANDRA Drag Racing Series =

2015/16 ANDRA Drag Racing Series was an Australian National Drag Racing Association sanctioned drag racing series in Australia. The championship started in Darwin at Hidden Valley Raceway and finished in Adelaide in April.

The series was televised on SBS Speedweek on Sundays 2 pm, Shows will also air on Fox Sports. Replays of all shows can watched via SBS On Demand or online through Motorsports TV, ANDRA Catch Up TV and Speedweek.com.au. MAVTV will show ANDRA Drag Racing in the US and Motors TV in Europe.

== 2015-2016 ANDRA Championship Drag Racing Calendar ==
Event	Event name	Track	Location	Date	TV Date
1	Nitro Up North	Hidden Valley Raceway	Darwin, Northern Territory	July 17–18, 2015	
2	NT Titles	Hidden Valley Raceway	Darwin, Northern Territory	August 14–15, 2015	
3	East Coast Nationals	Sydney Dragway	Sydney NSW	November 7–8, 2015	
4	Australian Nationals	Calder Park Raceway	Melbourne VIC	January 23–24, 2016	
5	Top Doorslammers and Australia vs USA Jet Cars	Calder Park Raceway	Melbourne VIC	March 12, 2016	20-Mar-15 SBS Speedweek
6	ANDRA Grand Final	Adelaide International Raceway	Adelaide SA	April 9–10, 2016	24-Apr-16 SBS Speedweek

== 2015/16 Results ==
Event	Top Fuel Winner	Top Doorslammer Winner	Top Alcohol Winner	Pro Stock Winner	Top Fuel Motorcycle Winner	Pro Stock Motorcycle Winner
Nitro Up North	N/A	Paul Cannuli	Scott MacLean	N/A	N/A	N/A
NT Titles	N/A	John Zappia	N/A	N/A	N/A	N/A
East Coast Nationals	Cory McClenathan USA	John Zappia	Steven Reed	Tyronne Tremayne	Mark Drew	Scott White
Australian Nationals	N/A	John Zappia	John Cannuli	Nino Cavallo	Chris Matheson	Cory Buttegieg
Top Doorslammers and Jet Cars	N/A	Finalist: Grant O’Rourke and Mark Belleri (no contest)	N/A	N/A	N/A	N/A
ANDRA Grand Final	Wayne Newby (exhibition)	Grant O’Rourke	Brian Lockman	N/A	Mark Drew	N/A

== See also ==
- Motorsport in Australia
- List of Australian motor racing series
