= Sportsman Division =

Sportsman Division may refer to:

== Auto racing ==
- NASCAR Sportsman Division, NASCAR's 1950-1981 series
- NASCAR Sportsman Division (1989–1995), the NASCAR Igloo Sportsman Challenge
- NASCAR Xfinity Series, NASCAR's modern-day series
- Open sportsman, Australian Sprint Car series
- Summit Sportsman Series, Australian National Drag Racing Association sanctioned drag racing series

== See also ==
- Sportsman (disambiguation)
