= 2016–17 Summit Sportsman Series =

== Summit Racing Equipment Sportsman Series Calendar ==
Round	Date	Event	Track
1	July 8–9, 2016	Nitro Up North	Hidden Valley Drag Strip, Darwin
2	July 16–17, 2016	Desert Nationals	Alice Springs Inland Dragway, Alice Springs
3	22-23 October 2016	Summit Series Round	Mildura Sunset Strip
4	19 November 2016	Rowe Memorial Super Stock Classic	Calder Park Raceway
5	3-4 December 2016	Summer Nationals	Adelaide International Raceway
6	21-22 January 2016	South Coast 660	South Coast Raceway, Portland
7	28-29 January 2017	51st Australian Nationals	Calder Park Raceway
8	3-4 February 2017	Goldenstates	Perth Motorplex
9	4-5 March 2017	Western Nationals	Perth Motorplex
10	12 March 2017	Supercharged Shootout	Steel City Raceway, Whyalla
11	1-2 April 2017	ANDRA Championship Grand Final	Adelaide International Raceway

== Broadcasting Coverage ==
The Summit Racing Equipment Sportsman Series will aired on SBS Speedweek on Sundays and replays via SBS On Demand or online through ANDRA Catch Up TV, Speedweek.com.au and Motorsports TV. Selected events will be live streamed online as part of the Garmin VIRB ANDRA Drag Racing Live Stream starting with the Rowe Memorial Super Stock Classic on November 19.

== Results ==
Round	Competition	Super Stock	Competition Bike	Super Compact	Supercharged Outlaws	Top Sportsman
1	Run as Super Comp	Kim Fardella WA (Super Comp)	N/A	N/A	Adam Murrihy NT	Jason Stares NSW
2	Run as Super Comp	Graeme Simms WA (Super Comp)	N/A	N/A	Mark Hunt SA	Matt Forbes VIC
3	N/A	N/A	N/A	N/A	Mark Zauch SA	Jason Stares NSW
4	Run as Super Comp	Tom Dimitropoulo (Super Comp)	N/A	N/A	Craig Gerdes VIC	Paul Russo SA
5	Rain out	Rain out	Rain out	Rain out	Rain out	Rain out
6	Cancelled	Cancelled	Cancelled	Cancelled	Cancelled	Cancelled
7	Run as Super Comp	Jamie Chaisty WA (Super Comp)	N/A	Run as Super Comp	Justin Russell VIC	Darren Saliba SA
8	Craig Geddes VIC	Errol Quartermaine WA	Chris Chipchase WA	N/A	Chris Went WA	Amanda Martin WA
9						
10						

*Super Comp is a combined bracket for Competition, Super Stock and Super Compact where there is an under subscribed field.

Round	Modified	Super Sedan	Modified Bike	Super Street	Junior Dragster	Super Gas
1	Grant Radcliffe NT	Chris Parris NT	Matt Lisle NSW	Tim Bryan NT	Joel Burns NSW	N/A
2	Gavin Chisnell QLD	Peter Tzokas SA	Leith Darrach NT	Jacob Mills WA	Luke Veersma WA	N/A
3	Cory Dyson VIC	Danny Buccella SA	Gordon Crawford WA	Chris Tatchell SA	Holly Camilleri VIC	Graeme Spencer VIC
4	Craig Baker VIC	John Kapiris SA	Gavin Dohnt	Chris Tatchell SA	Joel Burns NSW	Colin Griffin
5	Rain out	Rain out	Rain out	Rain out	Rain out	Rain out
6	Cancelled	Cancelled	Cancelled	Cancelled	Cancelled	Cancelled
7	Craig Baker VIC	Pat Caruso	Gordon Crawford WA	Graeme Cooper VIC	Jasmine Slamar WA	Darryl Stephen NSW
8	Erin Healy WA	Kyle Higgins	Bryan Finn SA	Chris De Bruin WA	Bailey McClure WA	N/A
9						
10						

== See also ==
- Motorsport in Australia
- List of Australian motor racing series
