= ANDRA Pro Series =

ANDRA Pro Series is the Six Group 1 classes representing the pinnacle of Australian National Drag Racing Association (ANDRA) Championship Drag Racing these include Top Fuel, Top Doorslammer, Top Alcohol, Top Bike, Pro Stock and Pro Stock Motorcycle. They compete across the country at venues in Western Australia, New South Wales and Queensland culminating at the championship finals at Willowbank Raceway at Ipswich in Queensland traditionally over the Queen's birthday long weekend in June.

== See also ==
- Motorsport in Australia
- List of Australian motor racing series
