= Australian National Drag Racing Association =

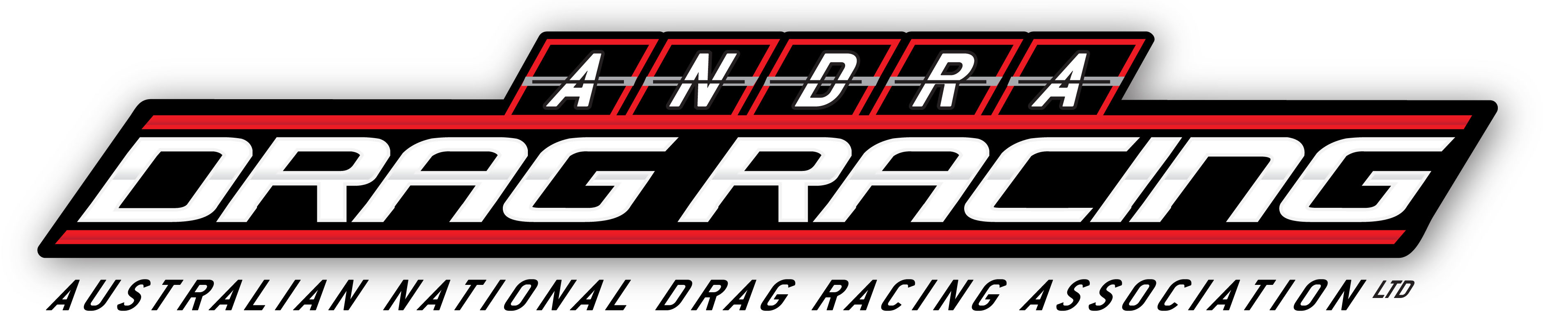
- Sport: Drag Racing
- Jurisdiction: Australia
- Abbreviation: ANDRA
- Founded: 1973
- Headquarters: Adelaide
- President: Tim McAvaney

Official website
- www.andra.com.au
- (Australia)

The Australian National Drag Racing Association, or ANDRA for short, is a drag racing sanctioning body in Australia.

The organisation was created in 1973 from a more drag racing oriented faction of the Australian Hot Rod Federation.

Today ANDRA sanctions races throughout Australia.

It also manages the ANDRA Sportsman Series - the calendar for which can be viewed here. - and also sanctions group one racing at select events, for example at the 2019 Westernationals where Top Doorslammer and Top Fuel Motorcycle competitors competed for a Gold ANDRA Christmas Tree trophy.

== ANDRA Champions ==
=== ANDRA Drag Racing Series Champions ===
ANDRA Drag Racing Series is made up of six group one classes which are all heads-up pro tree drag racing.

Year	Top Fuel	Top Alcohol(*First held 1991)	Top Doorslammer (*First held 1996)	Top Fuel Motorcycle	Pro Stock	Pro Stock Motorcycle
1975				Stan Pobjoy		
1976						
1977						
1978	Larry Ormsby					
1979	Larry Ormsby					
1980	Jim Read			Warren Afflick		
1981	Jim Read & John Maher					
1982	Jim Read			Rick Thornley	Claus Maluszczak	
1983						
1984	Larry Ormsby			Steve Harker	Greg Flaherty	
1985						
1986	Jim Read			Steve Kitchen	Hans Van Dyk	
1987				Peter Allen	Dave Missingham	
1988					Hans Van Dyk	
1989					Adrian Kelly	
1990					Adrian Kelly	
1991	Romeo Capitanio	Gary Phillips		Peter Allen	Chris Mills	Phil Howard
1992	Jim Read	Gary Phillips		Bill Curry	Hans Van Dyk	Les Donnon
1993	Jim Read	Steve Read		Bill Curry	Hans Van Dyk	Jason Lee
1994	Jim Read	Steve Reed		Bill Curry	Bruce Leake	Les Donnon
1995	Graeme Cowin	Gary Phillips		Peter Allen	Peter Ridgeway	Les Donnon
1996	Jim Read	Gary Phillips	Victor Bray	Gavin Spann	Joe Polito	Les Donnon
1997	Glenn Mikres	Gary Phillips	Victor Bray	Bruce Barnett	Joe Polito	Les Donnon
1998	Glenn Mikres	Gary Phillips	Victor Bray	Jeff Smith	Rob Tucker	Les Donnon
1999	Robin Kirby	Gary Phillips	Victor Bray	Craig McPhee	Craig Hasted	Jason Lee
2000	Darren Di Filippo	Gary Phillips	Victor Bray	Jeff Smith	Peter Ridgeway	Sam Scerri
2001	Steve Read	Gary Phillips	Victor Bray	Ian Ashelford	Peter Ridgeway	Sam Scerri
2002	Steve Read	Wayne Newby	Peter Kapiris	Ian Ashelford	Peter Ridgeway	Nevil Langley
2003	Jim Read	Gary Phillips	Ben Bray	Ian Ashelford	Jon Andriopoulo	Sam Scerri
2004	John Cowin	Gary Phillips	Brett Stevens	Jay Upton	Tony Wedlock	Daniel Peatey
2005	Darren Morgan	Gary Phillips	Ben Bray	Brett Stevens	David Rogan	Michael Gilbertson
2006	Phil Read	Ben Bray	Steve Stanic	Jay Upton	David Rogan	Daniel Peatey
2007	Phil Read	Wayne Newby	Gary Phillips	Jay Upton	Jon Andriopoulo	Dion Prowse
2008	Phil Read	Brett Stevens	John Zappia	Troy McLean	Aaron Tremayne	Peter Cochrane
2009	Phil Lamattina	Gary Phillips	John Zappia	Athol Williams	Aaron Tremayne	Michael Gilbertson
2010	Martin Stamatis	Gary Phillips	John Zappia	Chris Matheson	Aaron Tremayne	Andrew Badcock
2011	Darren Morgan	Wayne Newby	John Zappia	Chris Matheson	Aaron Tremayne	Maurice Allen
2012	Darren Morgan	Gary Phillips	John Zappia	Chris Matheson	Michael Ali	Locky Ireland
2013	Darren Morgan	Gary Phillips	John Zappia	Chris Porter	Jason Grima	Luke Crowley
2014	Phil Lamattina	Steven Ham	John Zappia	Mark Drew	Aaron Tremayne	Luke Crowley
2015	Damien Harris	Gary Phillips	John Zappia	Mark Drew	Lee Bektash	Maurice Allen
2016	Cory McClenathan	John Cannuli	John Zappia	Chris Porter	Nino Cavallo	Corey Buttigieg
2017		John Cannuli	John Zappia	Damian Muscat	Lee Bektash	
2022			Daniel Gregorini	Greg Durack		

==== ANDRA Sportsman Series Champions ====
Year	Competition	Super Stock	Competition Bike	Super Compact (*First held 2009)	Supercharged Outlaws (*First held 2006)
1991	Graeme Silk	Donna Sizmur	Paul Andrews		
1992	Graeme Silk	Donna Sizmur	Lou Cotter		
1993	Wayne Jones	John Sammut	John Parker		
1994	Ray Walker		Paul Andrews		
1995	Charles Van Ysseldyk	Peter Michael	Ashley Taylor		
1996	Ray Walker	Colin Lloyd	Mick Sargent		
1997	Wayne Cartledge	Steve Flynn	Rhett Lougheed		
1998		Geoff Chaisty			
1999		Geoff Chaisty			
2000	Rod Rainford	Les Heintz	Perry Mackie		
2001	Mick Utting	Ian Brown	Perry Mackie		
2002	Anthony Selva	Ian Brown	Rhett Lougheed		
2003	Anthony Selva	Graeme Simms	John Parker		
2004	Shane Baxter	Colin Lloyd	John Parker		
2005	Craig Geddes	Colin Lloyd	Ross Lemberg		
2006	Shane Baxter	Bruno Cavallo	John Parker		Charlie Micali
2007	Justin Walshe	Ross Sacre	Ross Lemberg		Daniel Reed
2008	Phillip Otto	Nino Cavallo	Dave Rundmann		John Ward
2009	Phillip Otto	Nino Cavallo	Kevin Gummow	Damien McKern	Christine Steffens
2010	Graeme Frawley	Nino Cavallo	Shayne Homes	Damien McKern	Christine Steffens
2011	John McSweeney	John Ioannidis	Kevin Gummow	Rod Harvey	Matt Watts
2012	Wayne Keys	Jason Simpson	Kevin Gummow	Robert Novak	Matt Watts
2013	Greg Clayton	Darren Parker	Corey Buttigieg	Rod Harvey	Luke Marsden
2014	Alistair McClure	Jake Chaisty	Ross Smith	Domenic Rigoli	Doina Day
2015	Alistair McClure	Steven Norman	Ross Smith	Domenic Rigoli	Donald Freind
2016	Craig Geddes	Kim Fardella	Paulo Pires	Matt Lisle	Adam Murrihy
2017	Craig Geddes	Jamie Chaisty		Andrew Dyson	Adam Murrihy
2018	Craig Geddes	Jim Ioannidis	Tony Frost		Justin Russell
2019	Craig Geddes	Alex Panagiotidis	Rob Cassar		Paul Stephen
2020/2021	Craig Geddes	Matt Forbes	Levi Addison		Christine Steffens
2022	Craig Geddes	Steve Norman	Phill Paton		Mark Hunt
2023	Craig Geddes	Adrian Vella	Joe Khoury		Alan Mahnkoph
2024/2025 (Regional Championship)	Rick Johns	Steve Norman	Robert Cassar		Doina Day

Year	Top Sportsman (*First held 2015)	Modified	Super Sedan	Modified Bike	Super Street	Junior Dragster	Super Gas
1991		Bob Millet	John Clark	Paul Nieuwhof	Randall Pfuh		Stephen Crook
1992		Mick Utting	John Koukides	Alan Bliesner	Gary Paciocco		Colin Lloyd
1993		Mark Mitchell	Graeme Cooper	Gavin Carlini	Margaret Hartill-Law		Colin Lloyd
1994		Greg Leahy	Terry Agland	Lino Ruggieri	Juan Kudnig		Colin Lloyd
1995		Jon Sting	Graeme Cooper	Trevor Sage	Juan Kudnig		Craig Geddes
1996		Mark Mitchell	Jason Grima	Sean Arthur	Juan Kudnig		Des Wollstencroft
1997		Graeme Frawley	Jason Grima	Phil Parker	Gavin Hamilton		Des Wollstencroft
1998			Juan Kudnig		Raymond Ross	Kelly Bettes	Colin Griffin
1999			Juan Kudnig		Raymond Ross		Des Wollstencroft
2000		Scott Fitzpatrick	Mark Lee	Andrew Le Dilly	Paul Doeblien	Mark Allan	Dale O'Dwyer
2001		Rodney Moore	Shane Wynd	Andrew Le Dilly	Mick Yfantidis	Shane Tucker	Lee Bektash
2002		David Ferricks	David Grima	Darrell Boekholt	Juan Kudnig	Joshua Fletcher	Dale O'Dwyer
2003		Phillip Otto	David Grima	Robert Shaw	Kevin Stipkovich	Robert Adams	Warren Smith
2004		Matt Treasure	David Grima	Marty Searle		Robert Adams	Neil Maxwell
2005		Graeme Frawley	Neale Constantinou	Robert Stevenson	Matt Treloar	J Price	Dave Newcombe
2006		Graeme Frawley	Greg Fowler	Alex Borg	Darren Kellaway	Nicholas Wroe	Graeme Spencer
2007		Graeme Frawley	Shane Wynd	Adam Ewing	Wayne Batson	J Paine	Joe Catanzariti
2008		Mark Eadie	Greg Fowler	Adam Ewing	Tony Wallace	Loughlin Boyde	Joe Catanzariti
2009		Mark Eadie	Greg Fowler	Jason Hammelswang	Paul Dilley	Blaze Hansen	Darryl Stephen
2010		Kelly Corbett	Paul Partridge	A Roberts	Terri Sander	Caleb Oberg	Dale O'Dwyer
2011		Tony Littlewood	Steven Folwer	Ryan Denis	Rob Harrington	Jake Donnelly	Joe Catanzariti
2012		Kenny Stewart	Steven Folwer	Daniel Sekli	Rob Harrington	Jake Donnelly	Simon Isherwood
2013		Craig Baker	John Kapiris	Gavin Dohnt	Carl Taylor	Brayden Naylor	Matt Forbes
2014		Shane Wynd	John Kapiris	David Carroll	Joe Jurkovic	Toby Austin	Matt Forbes
2015	Steven Fowler	Michelle Osborn	John Kapiris	Ian Read	Enzo Clemente	Eden Ward	Graeme Spencer
2016	Jason Stares	Matt Forbes	John Kapiris	Bryan Finn	Kylie Tanner	Michael Naylor	Darryl Stephen
2017	Jason Stares	Craig Baker	George Tipoukidis	Bryan Finn	Chris Tatchell	Kelly Donnelly	Colin Griffin
2018	Jason Arbery	Matt Czerny	Peter Tzokas	Danny Rickard	Harry Harris	Bradley Bishop	Graeme Spencer
2019	Jason Arbery	Adam Mundy	Martin Mirco	Jake Hamilton-Moderate	Paul Jennings	Jake Berias	Adrian McGrotty
2020/2021	Sam Cardinale	Adam Mundy	Martin Mirco	Shane Walker	Paul Garbellini	Sarah Donnelly	Colin Griffin
2022	Vlado Turic	Craig Baker	Peter Tzokas	Shane Walker	Lisa Garbellini	Brodie Zappia	Graeme Spencer
2023	Leon Davies	Simon Barlow	Lance Larcombe	Brian Alvisio	Tommy Turic	Ross Lamattina	Robert Bergamin
2024/2025 (Regional Championship)	Leon Davies	Cory Dyson	Anthony Miskelly	Dean Jamieson	Michael Jennings	Bailey Hawke	Adrian McGrotty

=== John Storm Memorial Trophy ===
In memory of the first National Director of ANDRA John Storm, is an annual national award to sportsman competitor who scores the highest overall points from all rounds of the Summit sportsman series.

Year	John Storm Memorial Trophy
1975	Harrold/Hawthorne
1976	John Kreis
1977	Col Dunn
1978	Brenton Stein
1979	Jim Read
1980	Graham Hill
1981	Fred Dudek
1982	David Baines
1983	David Baines
1984	David Millington
1985	
1986	Peter Michael
1987	Errol Quartermaine
1988	
1989	
1990	
1991	Paul Andrews
1992	5 Tied- not awarded
1993	Colin Lloyd
1994	Juan Kudnig
1995	Juan Kudnig
1996	Juan Kudnig
1997	Rhett Lougheed
1998	John Parker
1999	Juan Kudnig
2000	Perry Mackie
2001	Tom Dimitropolous
2002	Ian Brown
2003	Graeme Simms
2004	John Parker
2005	Colin Lloyd
2006	Bruno Cavallo
2007	Bruno Cavallo
2008	Phillip Otto
2009	Jason Hammelswang
2010	Kelly Corbet
2011	Nino Cavallo
2012	Jake Donnelly
2013	Luke Marsden
2014	Craig Geddes
2015	Toby Austin
2016	Matt Forbes
2017	Bryan Finn
2018	Jason Arbery
2019	Jason Arbery
2020/2021	Christine Steffens
2022	Vlado Turic
2023	Lance Larcombe
2024/2025	Edgell Mallis

== ANDRA Hall of Fame ==
- Dennis Syrmis
- Graeme Cowin
- Mick Atholwood
- Paul Rogers Snr
- George Bailey
- Gary Miocevich
- Jim Reed
- Joe ‘Buzzard’ Gatt
- John Taverna
- Jim Read
- Harry White
- Larry Ormsby
- Eddie Thomas

== ANDRA National records ==
Class	Record	Name	Vehicle	Track	Date
Top Fuel	3.725	Phil Read	Dragster	The Bend	10/24
	329.21	Damien Harris	Dragster	The Bend	04/24
Funny Car	4.863	Gary Densham	Monte Carlo/BAE 500	Willowbank	01/09
	311.41 MPH	Damien Harris & Paul Shackleton	Monte Carlo/TFX 500	Perth Motorplex	12/09
Top Alcohol Dragster	5.504	Jamie Noonan	Dragster / NRE 477	Willowbank	06/15
	261.32 MPH	Jamie Noonan	Dragster / NRE 477	Willowbank	06/15
Top Alcohol Funny Car	5.410	Craig Glassby	Monte Carlo / BAE 511	Perth Motorplex	01/15
	267.85 MPH	Gary Phillips	Monte Carlo / BAE 511	Perth Motorplex	01/15
Top Alcohol Altered	5.789	Mark Sheehan	Altered / KB 511	Perth Motorplex	11/07
	244.56 MPH	Mark Sheehan	Altered / KB 511	Perth Motorplex	02/04
Top Doorslammer	5.693	John Zappia	HQ Monaro / Hemi 502	Willowbank	06/15
	258.42 MPH	Peter Kapiris	Dodge Saratoga / Hemi 521	Sydney Dragway	05/13
Pro Stock	6.877	Lee Bektash	Dodge Avenger / Hemi 400	Sydney Dragway	11/14
	200.14 MPH	Lee Bektash	Dodge Avenger / Hemi 400	Sydney Dragway	11/14
Top Fuel Motorcycle TFM/M	6.058	Chris Matheson	RB 1500	Willowbank	06/10
	238.51 MPH	Athol Williams	RBP Special 1550	Sydney Dragway	05/09
Top Fuel Motorcycle TFM/T	6.341	Mark Drew	Harley V Twin 191	Perth Motorplex	03/15
	230.76 MPH	Mark Drew	Harley V Twin 191	Perth Motorplex	03/15
Pro Stock Motorcycle	7.094	D & K Peatey	Suzuki 1655	Sydney Dragway	09/06
	189.55	R. Lougheed	Suzuki 1755	Willowbank	06/13

== See also ==
- Motorsport in Australia
- List of Australian motor racing series
- ANDRA Pro Series
- ANDRA Top Fuel
- 2015/16 ANDRA Drag Racing Series
- 2016/17 ANDRA Drag Racing Series
- 2015/16 Summit Sportsman Series
- 2016/17 Summit Sportsman Series
