= Sportsman =

Sportsman may refer to:

- Sportsperson, someone who competes in athletics
- (obsolete) someone engaged in recreational country sports, e.g., of hunting or fishing

== Publications ==
- The Sportsman (1865 newspaper), a British newspaper in print until 1924
- The Sportsman (2006 newspaper), a British newspaper in print from March to October 2006
- The Sportsman (Melbourne), an Australian newspaper in print from 1881 to 1904
- Sydney Sportsman, or simply Sportsman, an Australian newspaper in print from 1900 to 1960

== Transportation ==
=== Airplanes ===
- Acme Sportsman, a 1928 American light aircraft
- Glasair Sportsman 2+2, an American kit aircraft design
- International F-17 Sportsman, a 1920s American open-cockpit biplane
- Sportavia-Pützer RS 180 Sportsman, a 1970s German sport aircraft
- Taylorcraft F-19 Sportsman, a 1970s American two-seat cabin monoplane
- Texas-Temple Sportsman, a 1920s American light monoplane
- Volmer VJ-22 Sportsman, an American homebuilt amphibious aircraft

=== Other transportation ===
- Sportsman (train), a passenger train of the Chesapeake and Ohio Railway
- Sportsman Airpark, an airport in Oregon
- Dodge Sportsman, a 1970s Dodge B-series van
- HMS Sportsman, a submarine built for the British Royal Navy

== Other ==
- Sportsman (artist), Swedish musical artist
- Sportsman (DC Comics), fictional villains from DC Comics
- The Sportsman (UK broadcaster), UK based online sports broadcaster
- Sportsman of the Year, an award given by Sports Illustrated magazine since 1954
- Sportsman Channel, a US cable channel devoted to hunting and fishing
- Sportsman's Association, a UK gun rights group
- Sportsman's Park, a baseball stadium in St. Louis, Missouri
- Sportsmanship, conforming to all the rules of game and acting in a fair manner towards the opponent
- Remington Sportsman 48, a Remington Arms shotgun
- The Sportsman (painting), an 1824 painting by David Wilkie
