= Optus Sport =

Group of Australian sports channels

- Company type: Division
- Website type: Over-the-top media service
- Available in: English
- Dissolved: 1 August 2025; 15 months ago
- Successor: Stan Sport (2025–present)
- Headquarters: Macquarie Park, New South Wales, Australia
- Area served: Australia
- Owner: Optus
- Products: Streaming media; Video on demand
- Parent: Singtel
- Website: sport.optus.com.au
- Registration: Unavailable
- Users: ▲1 million (as of November 2021)
- Launched: 13 July 2016; 10 years ago
- Current status: Defunct

Optus Sport was an Australian group of sports channels, owned by Optus launched on 13 July 2016. Optus created the service after it outbid Foxtel for the English Premier League broadcasting rights in Australia. It was the main broadcaster of non-Australian soccer in Australia, broadcasting the English Premier League, FA Cup, J.League, K League, UEFA international matches and the Women's Super League.

On 30 June 2025, Optus announced it had accepted an offer from Nine Entertainment (owner of Stan) to assign Optus Sport's remaining football rights to Stan Sport, with Optus Sport to cease operations on 1 August 2025. Media coverage put the value of the transaction at about A$300 million.

Until 1 August 2025, Optus Sport was available for streaming via web browsers, the Optus Sport app on compatible smartphones and tablets including iOS and Android. It was also available through apps on selected smart TVs and video game consoles such as PlayStation 4, PlayStation 5 and Xbox One.

== History ==
In the beginning of Optus Television, Optus had used sports rights as a key differentiator between it and rival Foxtel. They carried C7 Sport on their subscription television network until March 2002, when Optus replaced them with Fox Sports (Australia), rebranded as 'Optus Sports' until October of that year. In 2009 Optus Television ceased to be offered to new subscribers and the service was eventually ceased.

In July 2010, Malaysian backed Fetch TV launched in Australia, available through Optus. In 2015, new CEO Allen Lew, who had launched parent company Singtel's EPL coverage, laid out a three-year plan for Optus to transition from a telecommunications provider to a multimedia company, as a 'content aggregator'.

Optus began trialling their own content delivery network in March 2015, and in November 2015 it was announced Optus had purchased the rights for the English Premier League in Australia until the conclusion of the 2018/19 season. In March 2016 it was announced the channels would be available through Fetch TV from Optus (rebranded as 'Yes TV'), as well as through a dedicated app and website, with satellite coverage available for those without appropriate internet speeds or for commercial venues. This announcement also included the fact that one match per round would be sub-licensed to a Free-to-Air channel. It was revealed by SBS that they had traded their FIFA World Cup licence for this sub-licence.

Optus announced pricing for the EPL coverage in May, which was revised after being poorly received by customers, with new pricing, including a period of 'free' coverage, announced in June.

Optus also announced they had done a deal with the Nine Network to share the International Champions Cup rights, with Optus showing all games played outside of Australia. Nine would share the China leg and retain exclusive rights to the Australian matches. This was the first live sport broadcast on the channels, with Manchester United playing Borussia Dortmund in Shanghai on 22 July 2016 as the first live event. Optus also added a friendly West Ham United pre-season match, and would later show their unsuccessful Europa League Qualifier against Astra Giurgiu.

=== Initial controversy ===
The news that Optus had secured the Premier League rights was not received well by existing supporters. Most were locked into plans with either Foxtel or other telecommunications providers, and were skeptical of how Australia's poor network infrastructure could handle 'live' broadcasts over IPTV. The first three rounds were mired with complaints on social media and in other media outlets.

=== Foxtel response ===
Incumbent rights holder Fox Sports Australia reacted quickly to the news they had lost the rights, removing the $15/month add-on BeIN Sports pack, and adding the channels to the existing sports package. Club TV channels for Chelsea FC, Liverpool FC and Manchester United were also added, as were agreements to show Arsenal, Manchester City and Tottenham Hotspur games on delay.

Foxtel claimed Optus had threatened legal action over the new 'free' channels, and so added a 1 cent per channel per year charge to each according to Foxtel and Telstra spokesman Peter Tonagh, Gareth Evans, Gerard Devan and Rick Mills.

=== Growth ===
Optus began to gradually add regional football competitions featuring Australian national teams, the 2016 FIFA Futsal World Cup and the 2016 AFF U-19 Youth Championship. They also screened the semi-finals and final of the 2016 FIFA U-17 Women's World Cup.

In October 2016, Optus Sport 2 began broadcasting ads with the tagline: 'This summer is going to be big', announcing the launch of a 24/7 Cricket channel on the channel for November 1, 2016, running until 28 February 2017. This was an extension of the existing Optus agreement with Cricket Australia that saw all Optus customers eligible for a Cricket Australia Live Pass. The channel showed highlights and full match replays from ongoing matches, and original content such as '#Stumps', which had previously been available on the defunct Optus Cricket app. It also showed classic matches from the Cricket Australia archives.

Live content was available by linking the Optus Sport mobile app with the Cricket Australia App, but no live cricket content was available on the linear Optus Sport 2 channel.

Optus struggled to find further new sports to add to the service given that most major Australian sporting codes were signed to long-term broadcast contacts. They bid for exclusive rights to the A-League but balked at the added cost of technical and equipment fees. As of May 2017, CEO Allen Lew considered the rights acquisition and launch of Optus Sport a success, and hinted that further similar offerings may be added to the 'Yes TV' platform in the near future, although they would be 'non-sport related' and 'family oriented.' It was later revealed that Lew was discussing the launch of the National Geographic App.

=== 2018 FIFA World Cup and relinquishing rights to SBS ===
Optus Sport purchased exclusive broadcast rights to broadcast 39 live matches of the 2018 FIFA World Cup in a deal with the public broadcaster SBS, who were awarded the original broadcast rights by FIFA. The remaining 25 matches would be simultaneously broadcast live on Optus Sport and SBS. The first game of the tournament that was broadcast exclusively on Optus Sport, Egypt vs. Uruguay on 15 June 2018, was marred with technical difficulties including buffering issues and failed connections. The negative reception and continued broadcasting problems resulted in a temporary arrangement made between Optus and SBS to broadcast all games on 18 and 19 June throughout a 48-hour period on SBS. This arrangement with SBS was extended on 20 June 2018 to include all group stage games, with Optus additionally leaving their app and streaming services free for the duration of the World Cup and until 31 August 2018 while refunding all current paid subscriptions. On 28 June 2018, Optus subsequently extended this arrangement to include all remaining matches at the World Cup.

=== Shut down and transfer to Stan Sport ===
Following months of speculation about a potential sale or assignment of Optus Sport’s portfolio, Optus confirmed on 30 June 2025 that it would transfer Optus Sport’s remaining football rights — including the Premier League, FA Cup, Japan’s J1 League, and the NWSL — to Stan Sport, owned by Nine Entertainment.

Industry coverage valued the transaction at about A$300 million and reported an upfront payment of roughly A$20 million from Nine, with Nine assuming a portion of the Premier League fees while Optus reportedly retained obligations of around A$40 million per year for the remainder of the term.

To facilitate the transition, Optus Sport continued through the UEFA Women's Euro 2025 tournament (3–28 July 2025) and then ceased operations on 1 August 2025, from which date Stan Sport became the Australian broadcaster for the affected competitions. Optus also offered discounted access to Stan Sport and issued refunds for unused portions of annual Optus Sport subscriptions, with some refunds processed by cheque due to billing-system constraints.

== Channels and content ==
Optus Sport operated eleven multiplex channels:

- Optus Sport 1

Optus Sport 1 was the main channel, which predominantly showed the Premier League. The 24/7 Premier League coverage moved to Optus Sport 3 for the 2018 FIFA World Cup. It also showed Scores on Sunday, a 90 minute show dedicated to the week in football both domestically and internationally, male and female.

- Optus Sport 2

Optus Sport 2 was the first overflow channel, and also showed selected international fixtures. During the 2018 FIFA World Cup, it was a secondary dedicated channel for the event, showing simultaneous live matches, replays, and highlights.

- Optus Sport 3–11

Channels 3–11 were the remaining overflow channels and broadcast simultaneous live events of the Premier League or other competitions shown on Optus Sport.

== See also ==
- List of sports television channels
- Internet television in Australia
