= Australian Off Road Championship =

- Category: Off-road racing
- Country: Australia
- Inaugural season: 1981
- Drivers' champion: Jack Rhodes (2016)
- Constructors' champion: Jimco (United States)
- Official website: www.aorc.com.au

Australian Off Road Championship (AORC) is an off-road racing championship held annually in Australia, with the inaugural event held in 1981. AORC events are defined as ‘long course’ events that are conducted on a track of no less than 15 kilometres in length, but are usually between 75 and 100 kilometres. The courses and tracks used for the AORC vary greatly and can be narrow, twisting and tree-lined, undulating farmland tracks, sand dunes and creek crossings, often incorporating man-made jumps and other obstacles but usually have high average speeds.

Most events run over three days with Scrutineering (safety checks on vehicles), Prologue (short time trial to determine starting order for event proper) and racing over one to two days (usually split into Sections). Most events also feature a Top Ten Shootout (opportunity for the ten fastest prologue vehicles to prologue again) and a Dash for Cash where the fastest two vehicles in each class (not involved in the Top Ten Shootout) race each other to win prize money.

To enter, vehicles must comply with regulations determined by the Confederation of Australian Motorsport (CAMS). There are ten classes for vehicles.

== Classes ==
Class	Numbers	Description
Pro buggy	1–99; 901–999	One or two seat buggy up to 6.0 litre naturally aspirated engine or up to 3.5 litre turbo engine.
Prolite buggy	101–199	One or two seat buggy up to 3.5 litre naturally aspirated engine.
Super 1650 buggy	201–299	Two seat buggy between 1.3 and 1.65 litre naturally aspirated engine.
Sportsman buggy	301–399	Two seat buggy up to 1.3 litre naturally aspirated engine. No longer recognised as a class at AORC level – these vehicles must run in Super 1650.
Extreme 2WD	401–499	One or two seat 'truck' up to 6.0 litre naturally aspirated engine or up to 3.5 litre turbo engine. Vehicle is otherwise unlimited in design and construction except it must somewhat resemble a registerable vehicle. Volkswagen Baja vehicles are included in this class.
Performance 2WD	501–599	Two seat vehicle based on a production vehicle with only moderate modifications permitted.
Superlite A	601–699	Two seat side by side recreational vehicle up to 1.2 litre naturally aspirated engine. Minor modifications only permitted.
Superlite B	601–699	Two seat side by side recreational vehicle up to 1.2 litre turbo engine. Minor modifications only permitted.
Production 4WD	701–799	Production 4WD permitting minor modifications only.
Extreme 4WD	801–899	Highly modified 4WD similar to Extreme 2WD
Sportslite	1001–1099	One or two seat buggy up to 2.5 litre naturally aspirated engine or 1.6 litre turbo engine. New class – not recognised at AORC level in 2017.

== 2018 events ==
- St George 399 – Queensland
- Finke Desert Race – Northern Territory
- Rainbow Desert Enduro – Victoria

== List of past winners ==
Year	Driver	State	Vehicle	Navigator	State	Vehicle
1981	Craig Martin	(Victoria (state)) VIC	Rivmasta			
1981	Charlie Albins	(Victoria (state)) VIC	Trekka			
1982	Paul Zacka	(Queensland) QLD	Holden Rodeo 4WD			
1983	Craig Martin	(Victoria (state)) VIC	Rivmasta			
1984	Doug Ryan	(New South Wales) NSW	VW Baja			
1985	Craig Martin	(Victoria (state)) VIC	Rivmasta			
1986	Neville Boyes	(New South Wales) NSW	Rivmasta Datsun			
1987	Les Siviour	(New South Wales) NSW	Nissan Patrol			
1988	Mark Burrows	(Victoria (state)) VIC	Trekka			
1989	Craig Martin	(Victoria (state)) VIC	Rivmasta			
1990	Daren Wells	(Victoria (state)) VIC	Rivmasta	Ian McPhee	(Victoria (state)) VIC	Rivmasta
1991	Les Brown	(Victoria (state)) VIC	Verco Hornet	Leigh Jones	(Victoria (state)) VIC	Verco Hornet
1992	Charlie Albins	(Victoria (state)) VIC	Trekka	Rodja McClelland	(Victoria (state)) VIC	Trekka
1993	Mark Burrows	(Victoria (state)) VIC	Trekka	Maureen Rose	(New South Wales) NSW	Raceco
1994	Mark Burrows	(Victoria (state)) VIC	Trekka	Ross Waller	(Victoria (state)) VIC	Trekka
1995	Daren Wells	(Victoria (state)) VIC	Rivmasta	Brent Hill	(Victoria (state)) VIC	Trekka
1996	Mark Burrows	(Victoria (state)) VIC	Cougar	Michael Shannon	(Victoria (state)) VIC	Cougar
1997	Paul Simpson	(Victoria (state)) VIC	Jimco	Colleen Boyes	(New South Wales) NSW	Hunter Rivmasta
1998	Fabio Zarfati	(New South Wales) NSW	Mitsubishi Pajero	Dallas Pope	(New South Wales) NSW	Mitsubishi Pajero
1999	Terry Rose	(New South Wales) NSW	Raceco	Maureen Rose	(New South Wales) NSW	Raceco
2000	Terry Rose	(New South Wales) NSW	Raceco	Colin Cuell	(New South Wales) NSW	Raceco
2001	Mark Burrows	(Victoria (state)) VIC	Jimco	Michael Shannon	(Victoria (state)) VIC	Jimco
2002	Mark Burrows	(Victoria (state)) VIC	Jimco	Janelle Svenson	(Queensland) QLD	Stealth
2003	Mark Burrows	(Victoria (state)) VIC	Jimco	Colin Hodge	(Victoria (state)) VIC	Jimco
2004	Shannon Rentsch	(Victoria (state)) VIC	Chenowth Millennium	Ian Rentsch	(Victoria (state)) VIC	Chenowth Millennium
2005	Shannon Rentsch	(Victoria (state)) VIC	Chenowth Millennium	Ian Rentsch	(Victoria (state)) VIC	Chenowth Millennium
2006	Shannon Rentsch	(Victoria (state)) VIC	Chenowth Millennium	Ian Rentsch	(Victoria (state)) VIC	Chenowth Millennium
2007	Hayden Bentley	(South Australia) SA	Jimco	Ben Chivell	(South Australia) SA	Jimco
2008	Shannon Rentsch	(Victoria (state)) VIC	Chenowth Millennium	Ian Rentsch	(Victoria (state)) VIC	Chenowth Millennium
2009	Shannon Rentsch	(Victoria (state)) VIC	Chenowth Millennium	Ian Rentsch	(Victoria (state)) VIC	Chenowth Millennium
2010	David Fellows	(South Australia) SA	Jimco	Mark Bergamin	(South Australia) SA	Jimco
2011	David Fellows	(South Australia) SA	Jimco	Mark Bergamin	(South Australia) SA	Jimco
2012	Matt Hanson	(Victoria (state)) VIC	Jimco	Leigh Wells	(Victoria (state)) VIC	Jimco
2013	Shannon Rentsch	(Victoria (state)) VIC	Jimco	Ian Rentsch	(Victoria (state)) VIC	Jimco
2014	Shannon Rentsch	(Victoria (state)) VIC	Jimco	Ian Rentsch	(Victoria (state)) VIC	Jimco
2015	Shannon Rentsch	(Victoria (state)) VIC	Jimco	Ian Rentsch	(Victoria (state)) VIC	Jimco
2016	Jack Rhodes	(South Australia) SA	Jimco	David Pullino	(South Australia) SA	Jimco

== See also ==
- Motorsport in Australia
- Finke Desert Race
