= Finke Desert Race =

Multi-terrain race in Australia

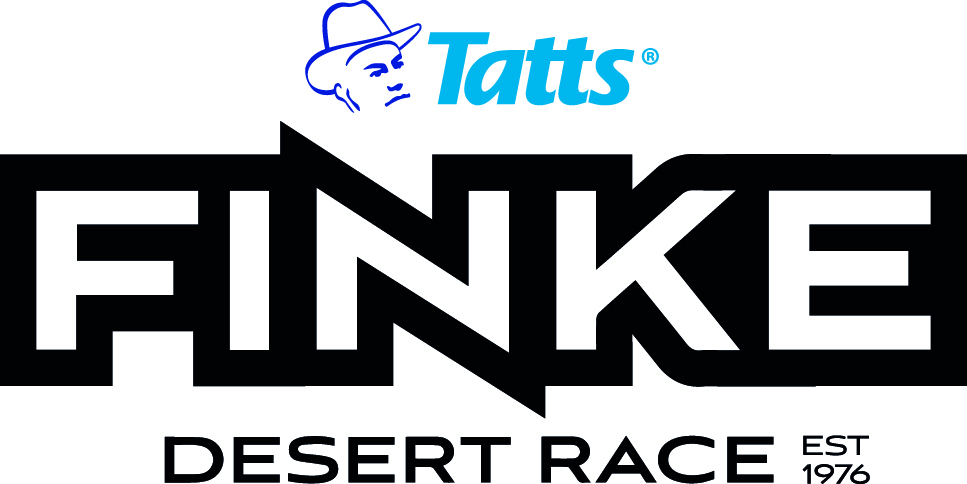
- Country: Northern Territory, Australia
- Inaugural event: 1976
- Official Website: finkedesertrace.com.au

The Finke Desert Race is an off-road, multi-terrain two-day race for motorbikes, cars, buggies and quad bikes through desert country from Alice Springs to the small and remote community of Aputula (called Finke until the 1980s) in Australia's Northern Territory. The race is usually held each year on the King's Birthday long weekend in June. "Finke", as it is commonly known, is one of the biggest annual sporting events in the Northern Territory.

== Track ==
Encompassing about 229km each way, the Finke Desert Race travels through many properties on its way to end up crossing the Finke River just north of Aputula. The track is divided into five sections:

- Start/Finish Line to Deep Well (61 km)
- Deep Well to Rodinga (31 km)
- Rodinga to Bundooma (43 km)
- Bundooma to Mount Squires (45 km)
- Mount Squires to Finke (49 km)

== History ==
The race started in 1976 as a "there and back" challenge for a group of local motorbike riders to race from Alice Springs Inland Dragway to the Finke River and return. After the success of this initial ride, the Finke Desert Race has been held annually on the King's Birthday long weekend ever since. The race is run along sections of the Central Australia Railway along a winding corrugated track, which goes through the outback terrain of red dirt, sand, spinifex, mulga and desert oaks. Even though the railway line was realigned and rebuilt in the early 1980s, with the old tracks being pulled up, the race continues along its original course.

While originally the Finke was only a bike race, its increasing popularity saw the introduction of cars and off-road buggies in 1988. A rivalry developed between the two and four wheelers, as the buggies were keen to claim the "King of the Desert" title. For eleven consecutive years the bikes were too quick for the cars despite the gap constantly narrowing. Finally in 1999, a buggy returned home first to claim the honour, with the bikes winning back the title in 2000 and 2001. From 2002 until 2004 the buggies held onto the "King of the Desert" title. In 2005 the title was changed to see two "Kings of the Desert", one for the cars and one for bikes, each picking up $10,000 for their effort. The last bike to beat the cars time was Michael Vroom in 2001 on his Honda CR500.

=== COVID-19 impact ===
The 2020 race was cancelled for the first time in the event's history due to the COVID-19 pandemic. This cost the economy of Alice Springs about $8 million. In 2021 about 200 Victorian competitors, plus race officials, were unable to attend when the Northern Territory classed all of Victoria as a hot spot after the state entered its fourth lockdown.

=== 2021 fatal crash ===
During the 2021 race, a vehicle struck spectators just 35 kilometres short of the finish line. One person was killed and two others, including the driver, were hospitalised. The remainder of the event was subsequently cancelled, meaning the bike race was not completed. The buggy category had already been won earlier that morning. The winning racer, Toby Price, had previously won in the bike category six times, and therefore became the first person to have won in both the bike and buggy categories.

== Media coverage ==
A 2018 television documentary Desert Daredevils: The Finke Desert Race and Finke: There and Back described the experiences of some racers.

Highlights are available to watch on 7plus.

== List of winners ==
| Year | Bikes winner | Vehicle | State | Run time | Cars winner | Vehicle | State | Run time |
|---|---|---|---|---|---|---|---|---|
| 1976 | Geoff Curtis | Yamaha 250 | Northern Territory | | Not held | | | |
| 1977 | Phil Stoker | Suzuki 370 | Northern Territory | | Not held | | | |
| 1978 | Geoff Curtis | Yamaha XT500 | Northern Territory | | Not held | | | |
| 1979 | Peter Stayt | Yamaha XT500 | Northern Territory | | Not held | | | |
| 1980 | Geoff Curtis | Yamaha 400 | Northern Territory | | Not held | | | |
| 1981 | Phil Lovett | KTM 390 | New South Wales | | Not held | | | |
| 1982 | Phil Lovett | KTM 495 | New South Wales | | Not held | | | |
| 1983 | Stephen Gall | Yamaha 490 | New South Wales | | Not held | | | |
| 1984 | Peter Stayt | Yamaha 490 | Northern Territory | | Not held | | | |
| 1985 | Phil Lovett | KTM 495 | New South Wales | | Not held | | | |
| 1986 | Stephen Gall | Yamaha XT500 | New South Wales | | Not held | | | |
| 1987 | David Armstrong | Kawasaki KX500 | Queensland | | Not held | | | |
| 1988 | Alan Roe | Honda CR500 | Northern Territory | | John Fidler/Peter Lewis | Corvette | Northern Territory | |
| 1989 | Mark Winter | Honda CR500 | Northern Territory | | Gary Nicolle/Jo Reed | Buggy | Northern Territory | |
| 1990 | Mark Winter | KTM 540 | Northern Territory | | Gary Nicolle/Neil Shegog | Buggy | Northern Territory | |
| 1991 | Randall Gregory | Honda CR500 | Northern Territory | | Keith Poole/Peter Walker | Buggy | South Australia | |
| 1992 | Randall Gregory | Honda CR500 | Northern Territory | | Greg Schlein/David Fellows | Buggy | Northern Territory | |
| 1993 | Randall Gregory | Honda CR500 | Northern Territory | | Steven Graydon/Tony Graydon | Buggy | Western Australia | |
| 1994 | Randall Gregory | Honda CR500 | Northern Territory | | Keith Poole/Peter Walker | Buggy | South Australia | |
| 1995 | Randall Gregory | Honda CR500 | Northern Territory | | Bob Mowbray/Janette Mowbray | Buggy | New South Wales | |
| 1996 | Dan Ashcraft | Honda CR500 | California | | Keith Poole/Peter Walker | Scorpion VW Buggy | South Australia | |
| 1997 | Stephen Greenfield | Honda CR500 | Northern Territory | | Paul Simpson | Jimco Buggy | (Victoria (state)) Victoria | |
| 1998 | Stephen Greenfield | Honda CR500 | Northern Territory | | Mark Burrows/Michael Shannon | Cougar Buggy | (Victoria (state)) Victoria | |
| 1999 | Rick Hall | Honda CR500 | Northern Territory | | Mark Burrows/Michael Shannon | Cougar Buggy | (Victoria (state)) Victoria | |
| 2000 | Stephen Greenfield | Honda CR500 | Northern Territory | | Mark Burrows/Michael Shannon | 2200cc Turbo Buggy | (Victoria (state)) Victoria | |
| 2001 | Michael Vroom | Honda CR500 | Northern Territory | | David Fellows/Tony Pinto | Southern Cross 2500cc Buggy | Northern Territory | |
| 2002 | Rick Hall | Honda CR500 | Northern Territory | | Mark Burrows/Michael Shannon | Jimco 2000cc Buggy | (Victoria (state)) Victoria | |
| 2003 | Darren Griffiths | KTM 540 | Western Australia | | Mark Burrows/Colin Hodge | Jimco 2200cc Turbo Buggy | (Victoria (state)) Victoria | |
| 2004 | Stephen Greenfield | Honda CRF450R | Northern Territory | | David Fellows/Tony Pinto | Jimco 2200cc Buggy | Northern Territory | |
| 2005 | Jason Hill | Honda CRF450R | Northern Territory | | Shannon Rentsch/Ian Rentsch | Chenowth 2000cc Buggy | (Victoria (state)) Victoria | |
| 2006 | Ryan Branford | Honda CRF450R | Northern Territory | | Shannon Rentsch/Ian Rentsch | Chenowth 2000cc Buggy | (Victoria (state)) Victoria | |
| 2007 | Ben Grabham | Honda CRF450R | New South Wales | | Hayden Bentley/Ben Chivell | Jimco Buggy | South Australia | |
| 2008 | Ben Grabham | Honda CRF450R | New South Wales | 04:04:43 | David Fellows/Andrew Kittle/Jason Adami | Jimco 2000 Series Buggy | South Australia | |
| 2009 | Ben Grabham | KTM 505 XC-F | New South Wales | 04:01:26 | David Fellows/Andrew Kittle | Jimco 2000 Series Buggy | South Australia | |
| 2010 | Toby Price | KTM 450 SX-F | New South Wales | 04:03:25 | David Fellows/Mark Bergamin | Jimco 2000 Series Buggy | South Australia | |
| 2011 | Ben Grabham | KTM 450 SX-F | New South Wales | 03:58:59 | Greg Gartner/Jamie Jennings | Ford F150 | South Australia | |
| 2012 | Toby Price | KTM 450 SX-F | New South Wales | 03:57:03 | Brad Gallard/Rick Geiser/Scott Modistach | Trophy Truck | South Australia | |
| 2013 | Todd Smith | Honda CRF450R | New South Wales | 04:02:08 | Hayden Bentley | Racer Buggy | South Australia | |
| 2014 | Toby Price | KTM 500 EXC | New South Wales | 03:56:29 | Shannon Rentsch/Ian Rentsch | Jimco Buggy | (Victoria (state)) Victoria | |
| 2015 | Toby Price | KTM 500 EXC | New South Wales | 03:52:54 | Shannon Rentsch/Ian Rentsch | Jimco Buggy | (Victoria (state)) Victoria | |
| 2016 | Toby Price | KTM 500 EXC | New South Wales | 03:46:55 | Glenn Owen/Mathew Ryan | Jimco Buggy | (Victoria (state)) Victoria | |
| 2017 | Daymon Stokie | Yamaha WR500F | Northern Territory | 04:11:12 | Shannon Rentsch/Ian Rentsch | Jimco Buggy | (Victoria (state)) Victoria | |
| 2018 | Toby Price | KTM 500 EXC-F | Queensland | 03:55:25 | Shannon Rentsch/Ian Rentsch | Jimco Aussie Special | (Victoria (state)) Victoria | |
| 2019 | David Walsh | KTM 500 EXC-F | Northern Territory | 03:56:01 | Jack Rhodes/David Pulino | Jimco Aussie Special | South Australia | |
| 2020 | Cancelled due to COVID-19 pandemic | | | | | | | |
| 2021 | David Walsh | KTM 500 EXC-F | Northern Territory | 01:45:34 (Note: The bikes only contested the first leg.) | Toby Price/Joseph Weining/Mark Dutton | Trophy Truck | Queensland | |
| 2022 | David Walsh | KTM 500 EXC-F | Northern Territory | 03:35:45 | Toby Price/Jason Duncan | TSCO Trophy Truck | Queensland | |
| 2023 | David Walsh | KTM 500 EXC-F | Northern Territory | 03:35:48 | Toby Price/Jason Duncan | TSCO Trophy Truck | Queensland | 03:21:46 |
| 2024 | David Walsh | KTM 500 EXC-F | Northern Territory | 03:38:12 | Beau Robinson/Shane Hutt | Mason Gen 2 Spec TT | Western Australia | 03:28:44 |
| 2025 | Corey Hammond | KTM 500 EXC-F | New South Wales | 03:46:30 | Travis Robinson/Paul Currie | Mason Trophy Truck | Western Australia | 03:24:35 |
| 2026 | David Walsh | Honda CRF450R | Northern Territory | 03:49:27 | Travis Robinson/Paul Currie | Mason Trophy Truck | Western Australia | 03:23:06 |

== Records ==
=== Most wins (bikes) ===
==== By rider (multiple winners) ====
| Wins | Rider | Years |
|---|---|---|
| 6 | (New South Wales) (Queensland) Toby Price | 2010, 2012, 2014, 2015, 2016, 2018 |
| 6 | (Northern Territory) David Walsh | 2019, 2021, 2022, 2023, 2024, 2026 |
| 5 | (Northern Territory) Randall Gregory | 1991, 1992, 1993, 1994, 1995 |
| 4 | (Northern Territory) Stephen Greenfield | 1997, 1998, 2000, 2004 |
| 4 | (New South Wales) Ben Grabham | 2007, 2008, 2009, 2011 |
| 3 | (Northern Territory) Geoff Curtis | 1976, 1978, 1980 |
| 3 | (New South Wales) Phil Lovett | 1981, 1982, 1985 |
| 2 | (Northern Territory) Peter Stayt | 1979, 1984 |
| 2 | (New South Wales) Stephen Gall | 1983, 1986 |
| 2 | (Northern Territory) Mark Winter | 1989, 1990 |
| 2 | (Northern Territory) Rick Hall | 1999, 2002 |

==== By manufacturer ====
| Wins | Manufacturer | Years |
|---|---|---|
| 21 | (Japan) Honda | 1988-89, 1991-2002, 2004-08, 2013, 2026 |
| 19 | (Austria) KTM | 1981-82, 1985, 1990, 2003, 2009-12, 2014-16, 2018-19, 2021-25 |
| 8 | (Japan) Yamaha | 1976, 1978-80, 1983-84, 1986, 2017 |
| 1 | (Japan) Suzuki | 1977 |
| 1 | (Japan) Kawasaki | 1987 |

=== Most wins (cars) ===
==== By driver (multiple winners) ====
| Wins | Driver | Years |
|---|---|---|
| 6 | (Victoria (state)) Shannon Rentsch | 2005, 2006, 2014, 2015, 2017, 2018 |
| 5 | (Victoria (state)) Mark Burrows | 1998, 1999, 2000, 2002, 2003 |
| 5 | (Northern Territory) (South Australia) David Fellows | 2001, 2004, 2008, 2009, 2010 |
| 3 | (South Australia) Keith Poole | 1991, 1994, 1996 |
| 3 | (Queensland) Toby Price | 2021, 2022, 2023 |
| 2 | (Northern Territory) Gary Nicolle | 1989, 1990 |
| 2 | (South Australia) Hayden Bentley | 2007, 2013 |
| 2 | (Western Australia) Travis Robinson | 2025, 2026 |

== See also ==
- Australian Off Road Championship
- Kalgoorlie Desert Race
- Pooncarie Desert Dash
