= Alice Springs Inland Dragway =

Motorsports complex in Alice Springs, Northern Territory

Coordinates: 23°47′55″S 133°52′11″E

- Location: Stuart Highway, Alice Springs, Northern Territory
- Operator: Central Australian Drag Racing Association
- Major events: Australian Drag Racing Championship, Red CentreNATS, Desert Nationals, Finke Desert Race

Dragstrip
- Surface: Asphalt
- Race lap record: 4.905 seconds (Kelly Bettes, Lamattina Top Fuel Racing, 2017, Top Fuel)

Alice Springs Inland Dragway, also known as ASID, is a motorsports complex located 13 km (8.1 mi) south of Alice Springs in the Northern Territory, Australia. Owned and operated by the Central Australian Drag Racing Association (CADRA), it is the only purpose-built quarter mile drag racing venue in regional Australia and is sanctioned by the Australian National Drag Racing Association (ANDRA) and Motorsport Australia.

== History ==
Prior to the construction of a dedicated facility, the Central Australian Drag Racing Association held regular race meetings on a runway at the Alice Springs Airport. As a result of years of lobbying by the association and local community, the Northern Territory Government provided an $850,000 grant towards construction of a permanent drag strip. Additional funds were sourced from club members and sponsors, with the facility opening in 2008. The first race meeting at the new dragway occurred on 22–23 March that year. Initial race meets were held over a 1/8 mile distance.

Further government grants in 2013 and 2015 allowed a number of upgrades, including the extension of safety barriers bringing the dragway up to international standards, permitting side-by-side racing over a full 1/4 mile and lifting a previous 200 mph (320 km/h) speed limit. As a result of this funding, ASID was the first drag racing venue in Australia to install LED lighting for the full length of the strip, staging lanes and braking area, while covered scrutineering and spectator areas were also added to the facility.

In September 2017, 12 people were injured when burning fuel was sprayed from a vehicle competing in a burnout competition during the Red CentreNATS festival. This incident forced a temporary shut-down of the event and prompted a significant safety review, highlighting the lack of consistent national rules governing burnout competition safety standards.

== Events ==
CADRA hosts a major race meeting, the Desert Nationals, at the Alice Springs Inland Dragway over two days each year. This competition attracts competitors from across Australia in a number of categories, with races held over a "half track" 660 ft (1/8th mile). The dragway serves as the start/finish line and staging area for the Finke Desert Race.

Since 2015, the dragway has been one of two major venues for the Red CentreNATS automotive festival, hosting drag racing events, as well as the Burnout Championship and invitational Burnout Masters "Desert Storm" competitions. The latter event awards significant prize money, with the top three performances guaranteed qualification for the Burnout Masters at the annual Summernats festival in Canberra. The burnout pad at the dragway was named "The Hard Ass Burnout Pad" to honour CADRA member Dave Harders who died in 2012. It was expanded to replicate the Summernats burnout pad ahead of the inaugural Red CentreNATS.

In 2021, ANDRA announced the establishment of an annual Australian Drag Racing Championship series, with ASID as one of five venues across the country to host a round in the inaugural season.

== Track records ==
As of 2022, the outright track record for a 1/4 mile run at Alice Springs is held by Kelly Bettes, at 4.905 seconds and a top speed of 297 mph (478 km/h). This record was set during the Desert Nationals in 2017, despite Bettes scrubbing the wall during the run.
