= Red CentreNATS =

Annual event in Alice Springs, Australia

- Genre: Car festival
- Date: September
- Frequency: Annually
- Location: Alice Springs
- Country: Australia
- Inaugurated: 2015; 11 years ago
- Attendance: 10,000 + (2015)
- Website: https://redcentrenats.com.au/

Red CentreNATS is an annual event that takes place in the Alice Springs in September. It began in 2015 and is ongoing. The car enthusiast festival involves an annual street parade, burnout competitions, dirt drag-racing, motorbike rides and several competitions for both attendees and vehicles.

The festival is co-run by Car Festivals Pty Ltd, the owners of Summernats, and the Northern Territory Major Events Company (NTMEC). It has become a key driver for the town's economy, boosting tourism to the region.

The event is reported to have the only permit in Australia to allow unregistered and highly modified vehicles to be driven on public roads for its street parade.

== History ==
The first Red CentreNATS in 2015 had 300 entrants.

More than 900 cars competed in events during the 2021 festival.

In 2022, there were 1,043 entrants with more than 10,000 attendees. The travelling Mulletfest competition, as well as a round of the Top Fuel Championship were added to the program. The festival also invited more than 20 indigenous school students and community members to restore and decorate a collection of vehicles.

2023 saw a substantial drop in entrants, with approximately 600 vehicles entering.

The festival was reported to have generated $6.79 million in expenditure stimulus for the Northern Territory in 2024. With $5.1 million included as new money directly into Alice Springs. There were more than 800 cars and motorbikes who took part with more than 10,000 attendances recorded. The festival also delivered 14,284 visitor nights, filling hotels and accommodation across the town.

In 2025, new elements were included in the program which included dirt drag-racing and a motorbike ride through the Bojangles hotel. The burnouts, show'n'shine and annual street parade, with more than 500 cars, remained. Following the event, a five-year extension was announced. A police traffic enforcement operation was conducted during the event, with more than 2,100 alcohol and drug road tests administered, resulting in eight positive alcohol readings and four positive drug tests. The operation led to dozens of traffic charges, the issuing of 160 speeding infringements, and the seizure of five vehicles for hooning offences. Police also reported that 77 vehicles were stopped, 27 infringement notices were issued, 13 notices to appear were issued, and two drivers were arrested at the scene.

== Incidents and controversies ==
=== 2017: Fireball incident ===
In September 2017, a major incident occurred during a burnout competition, when methanol fuel ignited and a fireball injured spectators. At the time, it was reported that one person was left in a critical condition and 10 others injured. The Royal Flying Doctor Service attended. The competition was ceased at the time. A fire and police investigation commenced. It was later reported that there was a total of 13 people requiring treatment for burns, including 4 whom needed to be flown to an intensive care unit in Adelaide.

In 2019, Car Festivals Pty Ltd and NT Major Events committed to a combined total of $1.2 million to improve safety at sports events as part of an NT WorkSafe investigation into the incident.

In late 2019, the event organisers were sued by 12 people.

In 2021, the Motor Accident Compensation Commission (MACC) initiated a civil case in the NT Supreme Court. Under NT legislation, people injured in a motor vehicle accident, including spectators, are unable to sue for damages under common law however they can seek compensation for medical costs and loss of earning capacity under the NT's Motor Accident Compensation (MAC) Scheme.

In September 2022, the federal court approved a $3.2 million settlement. The payout included $1 million in legal fees.

== Awards ==
Throughout the competition, there are many awards. These include:

Red CentreNATS Grand Champion (In honour of Nigel Warr)
Edition	Year	Winner	Car
12th	2026		
11th	2025	Jim McClaren	HQ coupe ENVIE
10th	2024	Tom Warr	1974 HQ ute
9th	2023	Brent Murray	Dodge Dart
8th	2022	Nigel Warr	HQ Holden Ute
7th	2021	Billy Shelton	VL Commodore - Sickest
6th	2020	Grame Miller	EH Holden Sedan
5th	2019	Brent Murray	EVL68 Dodge Dart
4th	2018	Troy David	Primed FJ Holden Ute
3rd	2017	Layton Crambrook	Humble HQ GTS Monaro
2nd	2016	Gregg Foss	XP Fairmont
1st	2015	John Curwen-Walker	FX Holden

== See also ==
- List of festivals in Australia
- Ute Muster
- Summernats
- Rocknats
