= Summit Racing Equipment =

American automotive parts retailer

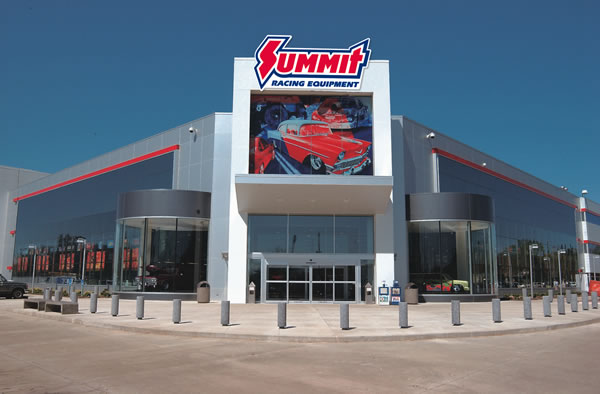
- Type: Private company
- Industry: Automotive aftermarket
- Founded: Tallmadge, Ohio, USA (1968)
- Key people: Scott Peterson, President & CEO Al Noe, CMO
- Products: Automotive parts
- Website: summitracing.com

Summit Racing Equipment is an automotive parts retailer with four retail stores and distribution centers located in Tallmadge, Ohio; Sparks, Nevada; McDonough, Georgia; and Arlington, Texas. Summit Racing Equipment is also involved in motorsports and other events as a sponsor.

== History ==
Summit Racing Equipment started in 1968 by Paul Sergi in Akron, Ohio and grew to over 100 employees by 1993, with their mail-order catalog driving their performance auto parts sales.

In 2016, Summit Racing announced it would open a warehouse and retail facility in Arlington, Texas; their fourth location after McDonough, Georgia; Sparks, Nevada and Tallmadge, Ohio.

== Motorsports ==
=== Team Summit ===
Summit Racing Equipment currently sponsors NHRA Camping World Drag Racing Series Funny Car driver Tim Wilkerson, Top Fuel drivers Antron Brown and Clay Millican, and Pro Stock drivers Greg Anderson, Deric Kramer, Matt Hartford, Kyle Koretsky, Dallas Glenn, and Rodger Brogdon.

Team Summit Legends (former Team Summit racers and friends of the company) include the following friends of Summit Racing Equipment: Don Garlits, Frank Hawley, Jim Oddy, Mark Pawuk, Connie Kalitta, Kenny Bernstein, Bob Chandler, the late Dan Runte, the late John Lingenfelter and the late Scott Kalitta.

=== Support of Sanctioning Bodies ===
Summit Racing Equipment supports the following sanctioning bodies (including series/points competition within many of them) to promote drag racing, circle track, road and vintage racing, autocross, and tractor pulling:

Drag Racing: National Hot Rod Association (NHRA) and NHRA Summit Racing Series, International Hot Rod Association (IHRA) and IHRA Summit Super Series, Australian National Drag Racing Association (ANDRA), European Drag Racing Series (EDRS), Loose Rockers, Mid-West Drag Racing Series (MWDR), Professional Drag Racers Association (PDRA), South East Gasser Association (SEGA)

Jr. Drag Racing: Midwest Jr. Super Series, NHRA Jr. Dragster Racing League (JDRL), IHRA Jr. Super Series

Circle Track: International Motor Contest Association (IMCA), Lucas Oil Late Model Dirt Series, United States Modified Touring Series (USMTS), SRE USRA weekly racing program, Summit Racing Modified Nationals

Road Racing/Endurance Racing/Autocross: American Endurance Racing (AER), Sports Car Club of America (SCCA), Sportscar Vintage Racing Association (SVRA), Trans-Am Championship, Ultimate Street Car Association (USCA) / Optima Challenge, World Karting Association (WKA)

Tractor Pulling: Lucas Pro Pulling League, National Tractor Pullers Association (NTPA)

=== Summit Racing Equipment-Sponsored Races and Events ===
In addition to sponsoring series/points competition within many of the sanctioning bodies listed above, Summit Racing Equipment sponsors a variety of motorsports events and shows including:

Events: Summit Racing Equipment NHRA Nationals, Summit Racing Equipment Midwest Drags Drag-n-Drive Event, and Summit Racing Equipment Autocross Week

Shows: International Show Car Association (ISCA) Indoor Car Show Series, Summit Racing Equipment IX Piston-Powered Auto-Rama, Goodguys Summit Racing Equipment Nationals, Goodguys Summit Racing Equipment Lone Star Nationals, Hot August Nights

=== Summit Racing Equipment Motorsports Park ===
Summit Motorsports Park

In 2007, Summit bought the naming rights to Norwalk Raceway Park, becoming Summit Racing Equipment Motorsports Park (often shortened to Summit Motorsports Park, though it is still sometimes referred to simply as "Norwalk"). The track hosted its first NHRA national event upon becoming an officially sanctioned track the very same year.
