= Sportsman's Association =

Pro-shooting organisation

- Founded: 1996
- Location: London, UK
- Key people: Savvas Toufexis (Chairman)

The Sportsman's Association is a pro-shooting organisation in the UK.

== History ==
The Sportsman's Association was formed in 1996 to campaign for the right of sports shooters to own handguns. This was limited following the Dunblane Massacre when Thomas Hamilton killed 16 children and their teacher using legally-held pistols.

Varying membership figures have been given over the past two years, but are now thought to be around 2700(May 2008 AGM) with 4000 being full members, 40 trade members & 2000other members.

The association tried to organise a boycott of the 2012 Olympics, urging people not to volunteer as staff and judges. They asserted that chosen venue, Woolwich Arsenal, was less suitable than the ranges at Bisley, Surrey. However the Olympic governing body wanted the shooting to take place in London.

== Policy ==
The Sportsman's Association exists to fight for the restoration of target pistol shooting as a legitimate sport and for fair and effective firearms legislation. It believes that the way to help to keep the sport alive is by supporting the government's decision to issue section 5 authority for selected competitors, to train in the UK on the run up to the 2012 Olympics.

Lobbying MPs, The Home Office & Parliament on behalf of members.
Free advice on licensing matters to members of SAGBNI.
Free advice on game & deer stalking.
Running pistol shooting holidays in the South of France
Postal competitions for both members & non-members.
Public liability insurance for members of SAGBNI.
Advice on firearms & ammunition.
Trade members offering discount to SAGBNI members.
