= Sportsman (artist) =

- Born: Per Magnusson
- Origin: Stockholm, Sweden
- Genres: Pop, R&B
- Years active: 2012–present
- Label: Best Fit Recordings

Sportsman, real name Per Magnusson, is an artist, songwriter and previous singer in the Swedish band The Sonnets. He has released one single and one EP on the British record label Best Fit Recordings. On 2 June 2017 Sportsman released his debut album Neverland, produced by the Swedish producer Johan Cederberg (HNNY). Sportsman's musical style is often described as R&B-pop.

== Biography ==
In January 2013 Sportsman released his debut single Rally, a duet with Linnea Jönsson, formerly the singer in Those Dancing Days. In November 2013 Sportsman released the EP Usher, produced by Johan Cederberg (HNNY) and Victor Holmberg (1987). It was followed by Begin Again, a cover of the Taylor Swift song with the same name. In March 2017 Sportsman announced his debut album Neverland with the single Running On A Beach.

== Discography ==
=== Albums ===
Year	Album	Label
2017	Neverland	Best Fit Recordings

=== Extended plays ===
Year	Album	Label
2013	Usher	Best Fit Recordings

=== Singles ===
Year	Album	Label
2013	Rally	Best Fit Recordings
2013	Usher	Best Fit Recordings
2017	Running On A Beach	Best Fit Recordings
