= Summernats =

Annual car festival held in Canberra, Australia

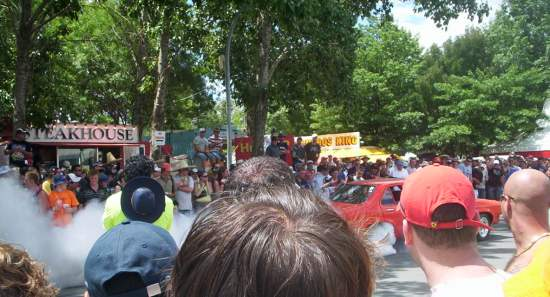
- Burnout at Summernats in 2005
- Genre: Car festival
- Date: January
- Frequency: Annually
- Locations: Exhibition Park in Canberra (EPIC), Canberra
- Inaugurated: 31 December 1987; 38 years ago
- Attendance: 130,000+ (2025)
- Website: www.summernats.com.au

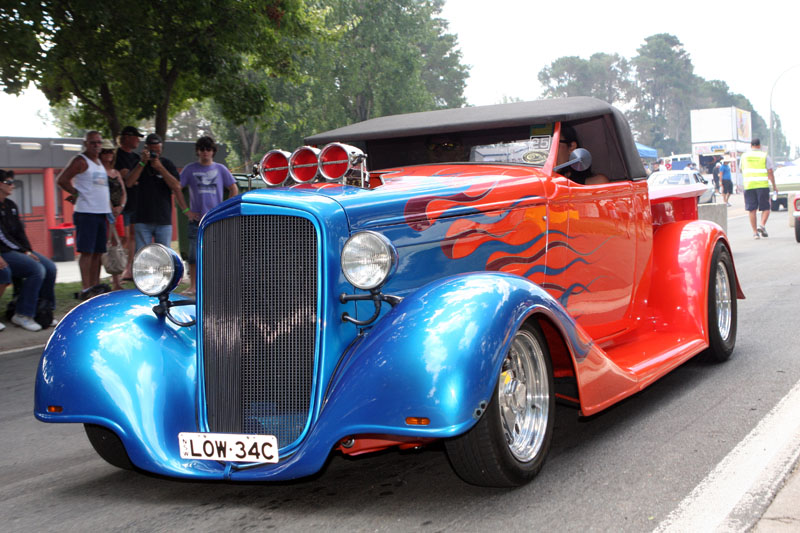

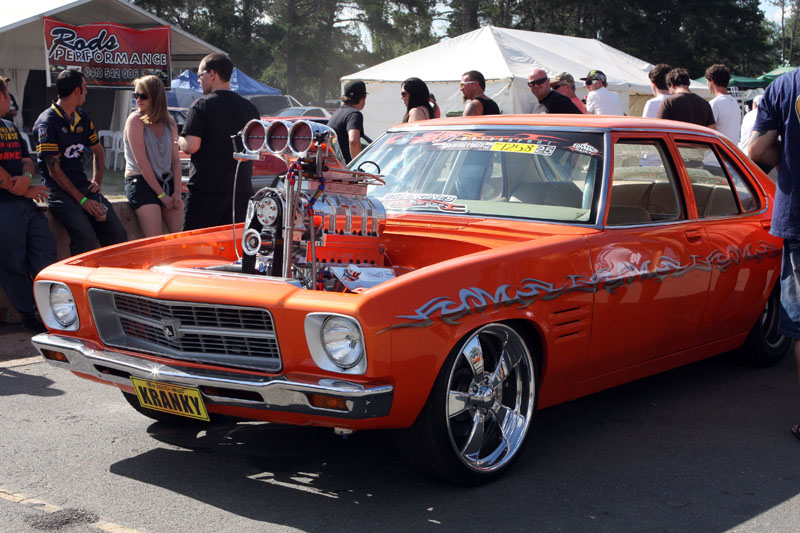

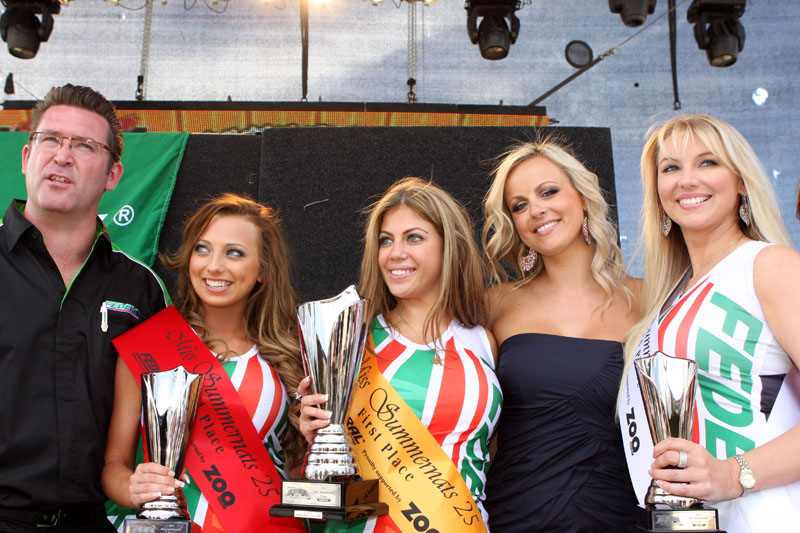
Contestants for "Miss Summernats 2012"

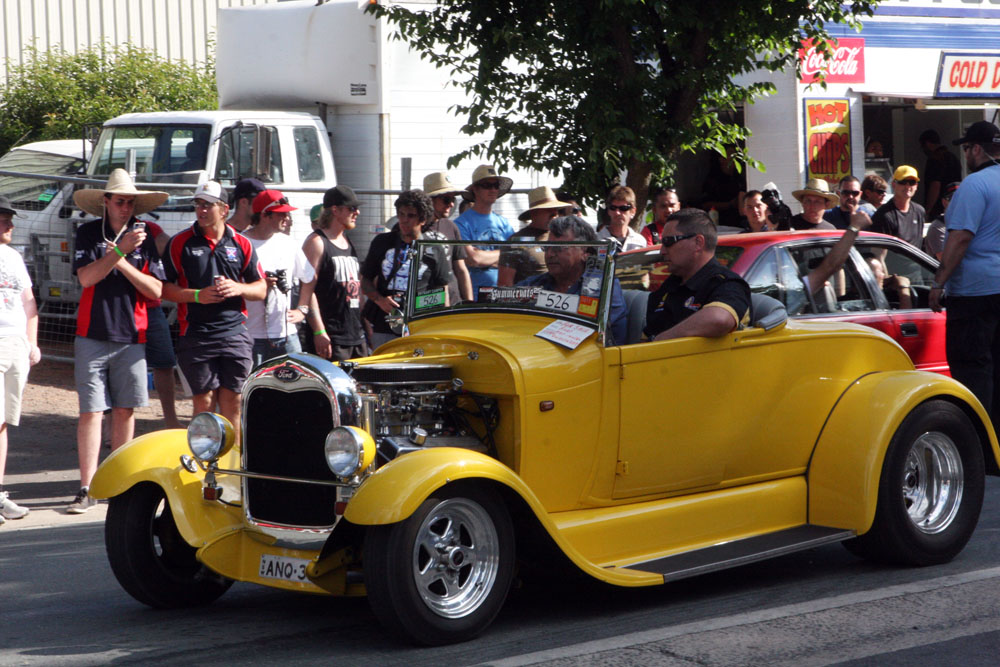

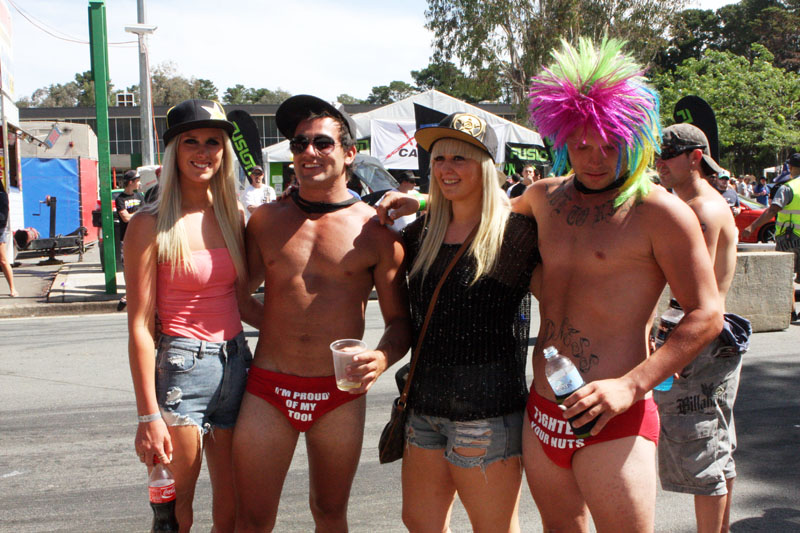

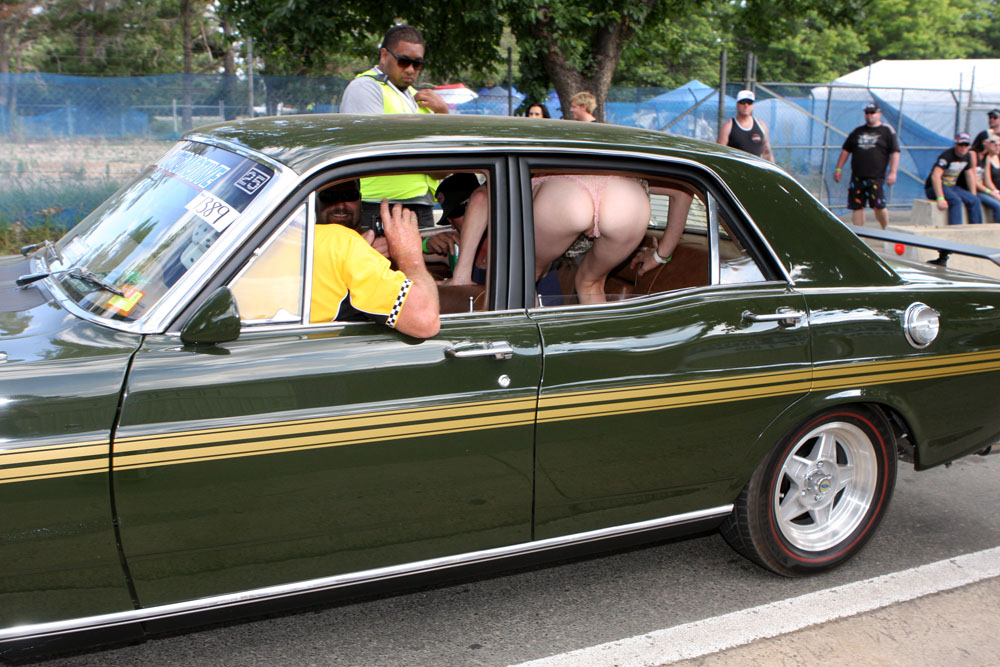

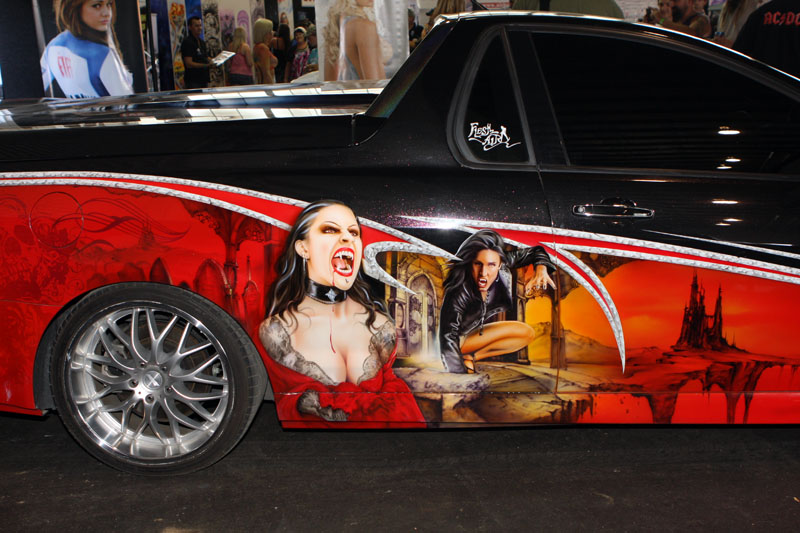

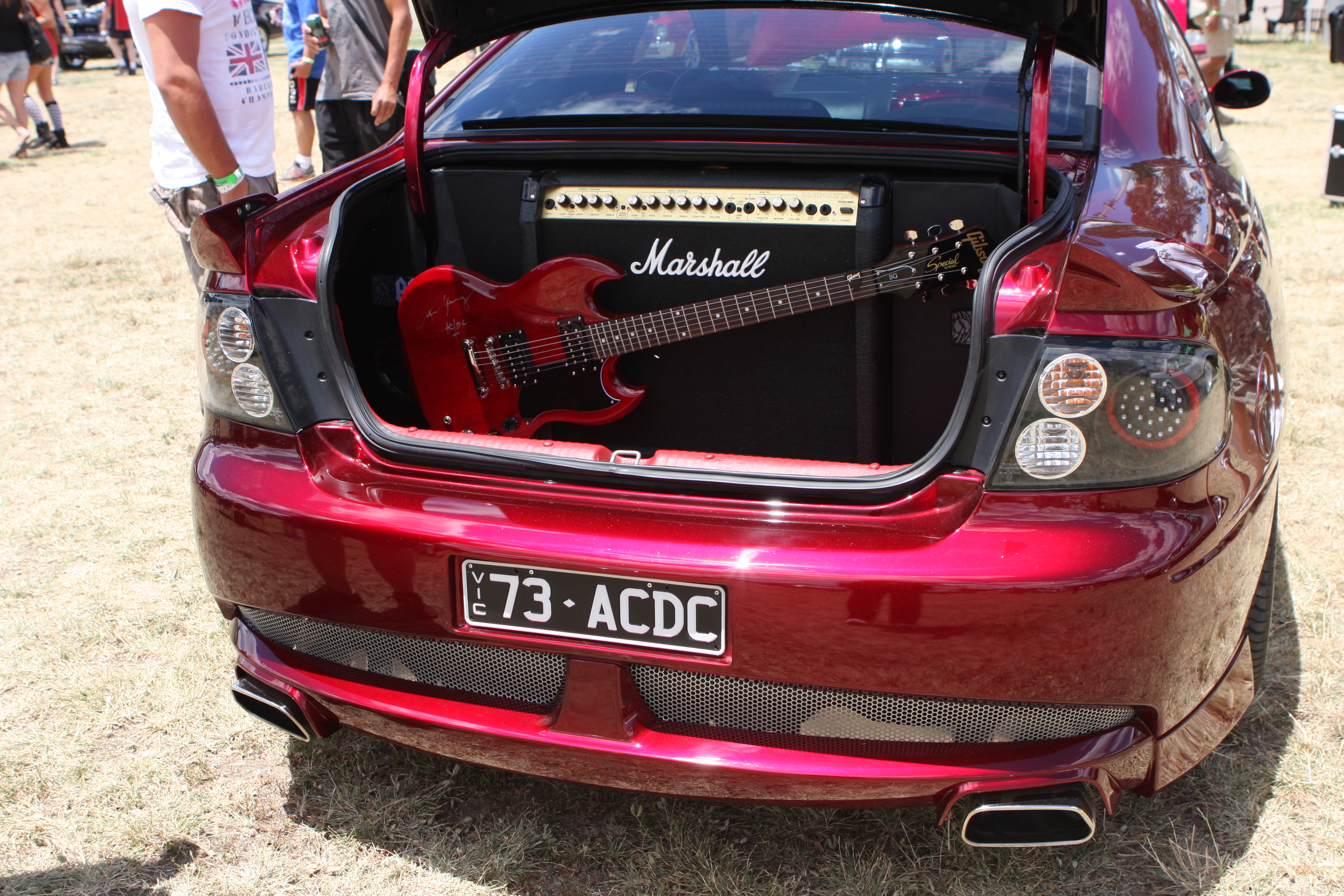

Summernats (a portmanteau of "Summer" and "National"), is an annual car festival held in Canberra, Australia since 1987, except 2021 due to COVID. Summernats, which is usually held at the start of the year, is a specialist car enthusiast festival in Australia, and an event which attracts tourists to Canberra. It has increasingly been promoted as an event for families.

The Summernats spectator attendance record was set in 2025, with 130,000+ attendees. Summernats is held over a four-day period (plus 2 days before the event for vehicle inspections), with many events, with prizes in competitions such as for burnouts, parades of cars around the track, fireworks at night and two outdoor concerts held on Friday and Saturday nights. The festival features many vehicles with airbrushed artwork, and restored, classic and modified cars.

== History ==
The first Summernats was held on 31 December 1987 where it was known as the Street Machine Summer Nationals.

=== Promotion and partnerships ===
Between 1987 and 2009, Summernats' promoter and organiser was Chic Henry. Henry sold Summernats in 2009 to a new company called Summernats Pty Ltd. The naming rights sponsor of Summernats is Street Machine magazine, and the presenting sponsor is Rare Spares.

The ACT Government has routinely expressed its strong support of Summernats, praising the significant benefit it brings to the Economy of Canberra.

The Summernats spectator attendance record was set in 2025 with over 130,000 attendees.

=== Venue ===
Summernats is held at 2 locations in Canberra, Exhibition Park in Canberra (EPIC), corner of Flemington Road and Federal Highway, Lyneham for the main part of the event and Lonsdale Street in Braddon for the Fringe Festival. In 2022, during Summernats 34, the burnout pad grandstand was officially named in honour of Summernats founder Chic Henry.

=== 2021 COVID-19 impact ===
Summernats 34, which was due to take place in January 2021, was delayed until January 2022 due to EPIC being used by ACT Health as a COVID-19 testing facility until at least the end of November 2021. A new, reduced capacity, 5,000 maximum versus the usual ~100,000 attendance, "Summernats Rev Rock ‘n’ Roll" festival was planned to run over the 5–7 March 2021 Canberra Day long weekend to tide fans of the car festival over. However, on 13 January 2021, this new event was also cancelled.

== Awards ==
Many awards are given out during the course of the festival, these awards include:

=== Grand Champion ===
The most prestigious award is the "Summernats Grand Champion".

Grand Champion Winners
	Year	Winner	Car	Colour	Location
38	2026	Adam Bickerstaff	1956 Ford F-100	Metallic green	
37	2025	John Fenech	'73 LJ Torana 'ORSM'	Metallic green	
36	2024	Joe Bauer	'68 Dodge Charger 'Blown RT'	Metallic red	
35	2023	Livij Krevatin	1978 Porsche 911 SC named 'DNA911'	Grey	
34	2022	Jason Mansweto	XW, named '2ENIL8'	Silver with orange strip	
33	2020	Todd Serenson	1967 Chevy Impala named 'Tribute'	PPG Vanilla gloss white paint	
32	2019	Rick Werner	1932 Ford Pickup named 'Tequila Sunrise'	Two-toned House of Kolor Kandy	
31	2018	Grant Connor	'67 XR Falcon 'Bad Apple'	House of Kolor Root Beer Kandy	Orange, New South Wales
30	2017	Mark Williams	HQ Holden Tonner named '2HAPPY'	Jet black	
29	2016	John Saad	Mazda RX-3 named 'FATRX3'	Silver	
28	2015	Nathan Borg	1977 Datsun 1200 ute	House of Kolor solid bright red	
27	2014	Henry Parry	1961 FB Holden sedan, named 'OLDLOVE'	Candy-apple red with a white roof.	
26	2013	Mick Fabar	1967 Ford XR Falcon sedan named 'ZEROD'	House of Kolor Kandy mix	Orange, New South Wales
25	2012	Ben Sargent	1971 HQ Monaro	Magenta colour with a prisma effect overlay	
24	2011	Peter Fitzpatrick	FC Holden named 'Trilogy'	House of Kolor urethane Kandy mix called 'Clover Green'	
23	2010	Joe Lore	Ford XY Falcon	Deep purple	
22	2009	Darrell Leemhuis	1990 Holden Rodeo Mini Truck, named BOOSTED	3 House of Kolor Reds and Galaxy Grey	
21	2008	Rob Godfrey	HQ one-tonner, named 'TOYTON'	House of Kolor Sunset Pearl	
20	2007	Zoltan Bodo	1992 VP series HSV Senator	House of Kolor Burple over a Gamma Gold base	Ngunnawal, Australian Capital Territory
19	2006	Aaron Fitzpatrick	1968 Datsun 1600 sedan	House of Kolor mix called 'Clover Plum'	Australian Capital Territory
18	2005	Deby and Gary Myers	1966 Ford Mustang coupe	House of Kolor Silver with Purple Marbleised flames	Narrandera NSW
18	2005	Dave Ritchie	1965 Ford Falcon XP Hardtop	House of Kolor Kustom Green Gold mix with flames	Dapto NSW
17	2004	Drago Ostric	Gemini wagon	House of Kolor green	
16	2003	Mark Course	1932 Ford Coupe	Switchboard orange	
15	2002	Peter Fitzpatrick	1959 FC Holden	House of Kolor two-tone Oriental Blue and pearl white	
14	2001	Anthony Fabris	1955 Chevy	Two-toned turquoise/white mix	
13	2000	Shane Burcher	Holden WB style-side ute 'DDROOL'	Dark metallic purple	Orange, New South Wales
12	1999	Peter Fitzpatrick	1959 FC Holden	Metallic green and custom graphics painted by Owen Webb	
11	1998	Peter Fitzpatrick	1959 FC Holden	Metallic green and custom graphics painted by Owen Webb	
10	1997	Howard Astill	XC coupe	White with wild 3-tone blue graphics	
9	1996	Peter Fitzpatrick	1959 FC Holden	Metallic green and custom graphics painted by Owen Webb	
8	1995	Dennis Laing	1964 Ford Galaxie	Custom Glasurit Purple and iconic graphics	
7	1994	Brian and Janelle Willis	1968 HK Monaro	Metallic green and custom graphics painted by Owen Webb	
6	1993	Peter Fitzpatrick	1959 FC Holden	Two-toned white and blue	
5	1992	Howard Astill	Fairlane		
4	1991	Howard Astill	1972 XA Sedan	Retro-styled aqua	
3	1990	Rob Beauchamp	LX Torana (with VL body shell)	Two-tone burgundy	
2	1989	Rob Beauchamp	LX Torana (with VL body shell)	Metallic grey	
1	1988	Rob Beauchamp	LX Torana	Metallic burgundy	

Note: The Grand Champion award was introduced at Summernats 6 - with Peter Fitzpatrick being the first recipient (the first of Peter's six Grand Champion awards). Prior to this the top award was; Top Street Machine Overall.

=== Miss Summernats ===
Miss Summernats Winners
Year	Winner	Age	Location
2017	Jazmyne Wardell		
2016	Amanda Beattie		
2015	Monique Dognan-Smith		
2014	Danah Wheatley		
2013	Sabrina Damiano		
2012			
2011			
2010	Hayley Swanson		Wodonga
2009			
2008			
2007	Jenelle Smith	19	Canberra
2006	Bree Fenton	19	Sydney
2005	Tanya Lazarou		Sydney

The Miss Summernats awards were cancelled for the 2018 edition and beyond.

=== Show and Shine ===
The Summernats holds one of Australia's most prestigious Show and Shine events. Vehicles from around the nation use the Summernats to announce their arrival on the Australian scene. There are the following categories:

- Real Street, Street, Elite and Tuff Street
- Top 60 cars, Top 20 cars and Top 10 cars
- Top Judged Elite and Top Judged Street

In addition, there are some awards that are highly coveted amongst the Australian vehicle modifying community:

- Master Craftsman
- High Impact
- Artistic Impression
- People's Choice

=== Air brushing ===
Custom Air brushing is also celebrated at the Summernats, where an exhibition occurs in the Meguiar's Pavilion.

=== Driving events ===
There is a multitude of awards handed out to entrants in cars, which are in the following categories:

- Burnout Championship and Burnout Masters
- Driving events
- Heads-Up Go to Whoa
- Best Cruiser
- Horsepower Heroes

=== Horsepower Heroes ===
In this competition cars are bolted to a device that measures horsepower at the wheel hubs. During the course of the Summernats, many awards in different categories are handed out in the 'Dyno-cell' and power readings of over 3000 hp at the wheels have been registered.

Summernats Horsepower Heroes Results:

Horsepower Heroes Winners
Edition	Year	Name	Car	WHP
38	2026	Darren Portelli	HQ Holden	3697whp
37	2025	Lee Povey	VL Calais	2109rwhp
36	2024	Maatouks Racing	VL Turbo	2504rwhp
35	2023	Cody Hunt		1643rwhp
34	2022	Henry Winter	FG Falcon	1256whp
33	2020	Maria Passos		2202whp
32	2019	Brenden Medlin		2483whp
31	2018	Paul Allen		1010whp
30	2017	Jake Edwards	LH Torana	1663rwhp
29	2016	Jake Edwards	LH Torana	1783rwhp
28	2015	Jake Edwards	LH Torana	2084rwhp (qualifying)
27	2014	Michael Daniels	Falcon XR6 Turbo	1131rwhp
26	2013	Jake Edwards	LH Torana	1666rwhp
25	2012	Jake Edwards	LH Torana	1592rwhp
24	2011	Graham Longhurst	HZ Holden	891rwhp
23	2010	Adrian Abella	FPV Typhoon	869rwhp
22	2009	Lyle Lemon	MRPSI	1533rwhp
21	2008	Craig Munro	TRYHRD VX HSV Clubsport	1895rwhp
20	2007	Trick & Mansweto	Ford Capri	940rwhp
19	2006	Craig Munro	TRYHRD VX HSV Clubsport	1262rwhp
18	2005	Eddy Tassone	VH Commodore	1259whp
17	2004	Brett Waine	VH Commodore	1470rwhp
16	2003	Eddy Tassone	VH Commodore	1376rwhp
15	2002	Rob Vickery	VH Commodore Ute	1023rwhp
14	2001	Todd Wilkes	Giocattolo	850rwhp
13	2000	Rob Vickery	VH Commodore Ute	527rwhp
12	1999	Jason Gray	HSV GTS	486rwhp
11	1998	Jason Gray	HSV GTS	404rwhp
10	1997	Matt Bunton	HQ 454 Van	372rwhp
9	1996	Anthony Fabris	VL Walkinshaw	325rwhp

== Controversy ==
From the first event, community opinion about Summernats was divided. In December 1991, the Liberal police and justice spokesman, Gary Humphries MLA, conducted a full-day call-in survey which recorded 77 callers generally supporting and 59 callers generally opposing the event. Concerns raised included the dangers of cars driving at high speeds in suburban streets and harassment experienced by women during the festival. Summernats 6, held from late 1992 to early 1993, marked a low point for the event, with large crowds outside the venue—particularly in Civic on New Year’s Eve—becoming uncontrollable and significantly damaging the festival’s reputation.

A crash at Summernats 2006 injured a number of people (various sources indicating four, five or six).

Street cruises were stopped after the 2005 Summernats, following crowd control issues, however thanks to the support of the ACT Government and the AFP as well as several years of exemplary crowd and entrant behaviour the City Cruise was re-introduced in 2014. The City Cruise is the first driving event at each Summernats and was limited to 300 entrant vehicles, however this was recently raised to 400. However Summernats spokesman Chic Henry was quoted as saying "The situation could be compared to so many other situations in life where people may have been having a bit too much fun, maybe having a bit too much alcohol."

=== Sexual harassment of women ===
In 2008 and 2011 mobs of men allegedly sexually harassed female patrons. In 2017 the promoters adopted a zero tolerance policy to harassment. The festival has experienced frequent complaints and allegations of sexual harassment and other violence towards women by participants, including having a history of women being shouted at to 'take your top off', and men holding placards that read "tits out for the boys" and "Tits or Skids".

In 2008, a mob of up to 400 men was observed by journalists surrounding and harassing women, leading Australian Federal Sex Discrimination Commissioner Elizabeth Broderick made a public comment that such conduct can foster an environment that may lead to rape. Security staff were described by press as "powerless" to stop the mob, although event organiser Chic Henry stated that he was happy with the performance of security.

In 2011, another mob was alleged to have occurred.

In 2017, Summernats announced its zero-tolerance approach to sexual harassment.

== Crowd behaviours (by edition) ==
=== 2026 (Summernats 38) ===
The 38th edition of Summernats was held in Canberra from 8 to 11 January 2026. There were approximately 130,000 attendees and 3,000 vehicle entrants. Over the four-day festival, police seized 19 vehicles in response to hooning and burnouts outside sanctioned competition areas, a 280% increase from the year prior. It is reported that 25 spectators were evicted with 6 arrests made for anti-social behaviour. According to police, there were more than 200 traffic infringements for speeding and unsafe driving behaviour as well as 100 defect notices issued, with numbers expecting to double once counting has been completed. Of the 2,200 random breath and drug tests completed, there were 14 drug drivers and eight motorists over the legal alcohol limit. There were 8 arrests made on ACT roads as a result of impaired and dangerous driving behaviour, including burnouts.

=== 2025 (Summernats 37) ===
There were more than 130,000 visitors in 2025, with 2500 cars cruising and on show. There were a small number of arrests made for a number of matters including assault, breach of bail, failing to comply with police direction and assaulting police. It is reported that officers issued almost 30 'move on' directions and more than 95 traffic infringement notices. There were also 32 vehicle defect notices, 3 vehicles seized and 5 drivers that tested positive to illicit drugs while drivings.

=== 2024 (Summernats 36) ===
130,000 entry passes were sold to the four-day event with 2,500 vehicles entered. Across the event, 2 people were arrested, 13 cars impounded and more than 100 defect notices issued. There were also a number of reported assaults, including a large brawl that included dozens of people. There were also reports of rocks and bottles being thrown at officers inside and outside the events.

=== 2023 (Summernats 35) ===
The 35th edition of Summernats sold-out with more than 120,000 entry passes sold and vehicle entrants capped at 2,700. The cruise circuit had to be closed early due to antisocial behaviour. There were 20 infringement notices issued and a number of arrests for assaulting police, breach of bail and being intoxicated and disorderly. 4 cars were seized over the weekend.

== See also ==
- List of festivals in Australia
- Ute Muster
- Red CentreNATS
- Rocknats
