= 2018 Radical Australia Cup =

Australian motor racing series

The 2018 Radical Australia Cup was an Australian motor racing series open to Radical SR3 vehicles. It was sanctioned by the Confederation of Australian Motor Sport (CAMS) as an Authorised Series, with Radical Australia Pty Ltd appointed as the Category Manager by CAMS.

The series was won by Kim Burke, driving for RA Motorsports.
