= List of Australian motor racing series =

The following is a list of Australian motor racing series.

Category	Series	Years	Most recent winner	Vehicle	Most wins
Racing Cars
S5000	Australian Drivers' Championship	2021–2023	(Australia) Joey Mawson	Rogers AF01/V8-Ford	(Australia) Joey Mawson (twice)
S5000	Tasman Series	2021–2022	(Australia) Nathan Herne	Rogers AF01/V8-Ford	No repeat winners
Formula 3	Australian Drivers' Championship	1957–2014	(Australia) Simon Hodge	Mygale M11-Mercedes	(Australia) Bib Stillwell (four times) (Australia) Alfredo Costanzo (four times)
Formula 3	Australian Formula 3 Championship	1999–2016	(Australia) Ricky Capo	Dallara F311-Mugen Honda	(Australia) Paul Stephenson (twice) (Australia) Tim Macrow (twice)
Formula 4	Australian Formula 4 Championship	2015-2026	(Australia) Jordan Lloyd	Mygale-Ford	No repeat winners
Formula Ford	Australian Formula Ford Championship	1970–2023	(Australia) Matthew Hillyer	Mygale SJ18A-Ford	No repeat winners
Superkart	Australian Superkart Championship	1989–2016	(Australia) Russell Jamieson	Anderson-DEA	(Australia) Warren McIlveen (seven times)
Formula Vee	Australian Formula Vee Nationals	1969–2015	(Australia) Kieran Glover	Checkmate SP02-Volkswagen	(Australia) Frank Haire (five times)
Tasman Formula	Tasman Series	1964–1975	(Australia) Warwick Brown	Lola T332 Chevrolet	(United Kingdom) Jim Clark (three times) (New Zealand) Graham McRae (three times)
Formula Holden	Australian Drivers' Championship; Australian Formula 4000 Championship	1989–2006	(Australia) Derek Pingel	Reynard 95D Holden	(Australia) Mark Skaife (three times) (Australia) Paul Stokell (three times)
Australian Formula 2	Australian Formula 2 Championship	1964–1965; 1969–1988	(Australia) Rohan Onslow	Cheetah Mk8 Volkswagen; Ralt RT30/85 Volkswagen	(Australia) Greg Cusack (twice) (Australia) Max Stewart (twice) (Australia) Leo Geoghegan (twice) (Australia) Peter Glover (twice)
Australian 1½ Litre Formula	Australian 1½ Litre Championship	1964–1968	(Australia) Max Stewart (tied) (Australia) Garrie Cooper (tied)	Rennmax Ford; Elfin Ford	(Australia) Max Stewart (twice)
Sports Cars
GT3	Australian GT Championship	1960–1963; 1982–1985; 2005–2015	(Germany) Christopher Mies	Audi R8 LMS Ultra	(Australia) David Wall (twice) (Australia) Mark Eddy (twice) (Australia) Klark Quinn (twice)
GT3	Porsche GT3 Cup Challenge Australia	2008–2015	(Australia) Ryan Simpson	Porsche 997 GT3 Cup	(Australia) Roger Lago (twice)
Carrera Cup	Australian Carrera Cup Championship	2003–2008; 2011–2015	(Australia) Nick Foster	Porsche 991 GT3 Cup R	(New Zealand) Craig Baird (five times)
Supersports	Sports Racer Series	2010–2015	(Australia) Mark Laucke	West WR1000-Kawasaki	(Australia) Adam Proctor (four times)
Radical Cup	Radical Australia Cup	2009–2018	(Australia) Kim Burke	Radical SR3RSX	(Australia) Neale Muston (twice)
Group A Sports Cars	Australian Sports Car Championship	1969–1975; 1982–1988	(Australia) Alan Nolan	Nola Chevrolet	(Australia) John Harvey (twice) (Australia) Chris Clearihan (twice)
Group D Production Sports Cars	Australian Sports Car Championship	1976–1981	(Australia) John Latham	Porsche Turbo	(Australia) Ross Mathieson (twice) (Australia) John Latham (twice)
Nations Cup GT Cars	Australian Nations Cup Championship	2000–2004	(Australia) Paul Stokell	Lamborghini Diablo GTR	(New Zealand) Jim Richards (three times)
Aussie Racing Cars	Aussie Racing Cars	2001–2024	(Australia) Joel Heinrich	Chevrolet Camaro - Yamaha	(Australia) Paul Kemal (three times)
Sports Sedans	Australian Sports Sedans Series	1976–1981; 1991–2024	(Australia) Jordan Caruso	Audi A4	(Australia) Tony Ricciardello (nine times)
Touring Cars
Appendix J Touring Cars; Group C Improved Production Touring Cars; Group C Touring Cars; Group 3A Touring Cars; V8 Supercars	Australian Touring Car Championship; Supercars Championship	1960–2025	(New Zealand) Will Brown	Chevrolet Camaro ZL1	(Australia) Jamie Whincup (seven times)
Appendix J Touring Cars; Group C Improved Production Touring Cars; Group C Touring Cars; Group 3A Touring Cars; V8 Supercars	Dunlop V8 Supercar Series; Super2 Series	2000–2024	(Australia) Kai Allen	Nissan Altima L33	(Australia) Dean Canto (twice) (Australia) Steve Owen (twice) (Australia) Paul Dumbrell (twice)
Appendix J Touring Cars; Group C Improved Production Touring Cars; Group C Touring Cars; Group 3A Touring Cars; V8 Supercars	Kumho V8 Touring Car Series; Super3 Series	2008–2024	(Australia) Jobe Stewart	Holden VE Commodore	No repeat winners
V8 Utes	V8 Utes Series	2001–2017	(Australia) Kim Jane	Holden SS Ute	(New Zealand) Ryal Harris (three times)
Super Touring	Australian Super Touring Championship	1993-2002	(Australia) Alan Gurr	BMW 320i	(Australia) Paul Morris (four times)
Production Cars	Australian Production Car Championship	1987–1995; 2003–2015	(Australia) Grant Sherrin	BMW 135i	(Australia) Stuart Kostera (three times) (Australia) Garry Holt (three times)
Production Cars	Australian GT Production Car Championship	1996–2002	(Australia) Brett Peters	Subaru Impreza WRX STi	(Australia) Brett Peters (twice)
Production Cars	Australian Performance Car Championship	2003–2007	(Australia) Gary Young	Mitsubishi Lancer RS-Evolution VIII	No repeat winners
Production Cars	Australian Suzuki Swift Series	1995; 2011–2014	(Australia) Gus Robbins	Suzuki Swift Sport RS	(Australia) Allan Jarvis (twice)
Commodore Cup	Commodore Cup National Series	1994–2012	(Australia) Adam Beechey	Holden VS Commodore	(Australia) Geoff Emery (five times)
Saloon Cars	Australian Saloon Car Series	2000–2015	(Australia) Gavin Ross	Holden VT Commodore	(Australia) Bruce Heinrich (five times)
NASCAR	Australian Superspeedway Championship (NASCAR)	1988–2001	(Australia) Andrew Miedecke	Chevrolet Monte Carlo	(Australia) Kim Jane (four times)
AUSCAR	Australian Superspeedway Championship (AUSCAR)	1988–1999	(Australia) Leigh Watkins	Ford Falcon	(Australia) Brad Jones (five times)
Touring Car Masters	Touring Car Masters	2007–2024	(Australia) Steven Johnson	Ford Mustang; Holden LH Torana SL/R 5000 L34	(Australia) John Bowe (four times)
Group N Touring Cars	Biante Model Cars Historic Touring Car Series	2005-2006	Paul Stubber	Chevrolet Camaro	

== See also ==
- Motorsport in Australia
