= Motorsport in Australia =

- Country: Australia
- Governing body: Motorsport Australia
- National team: no national team

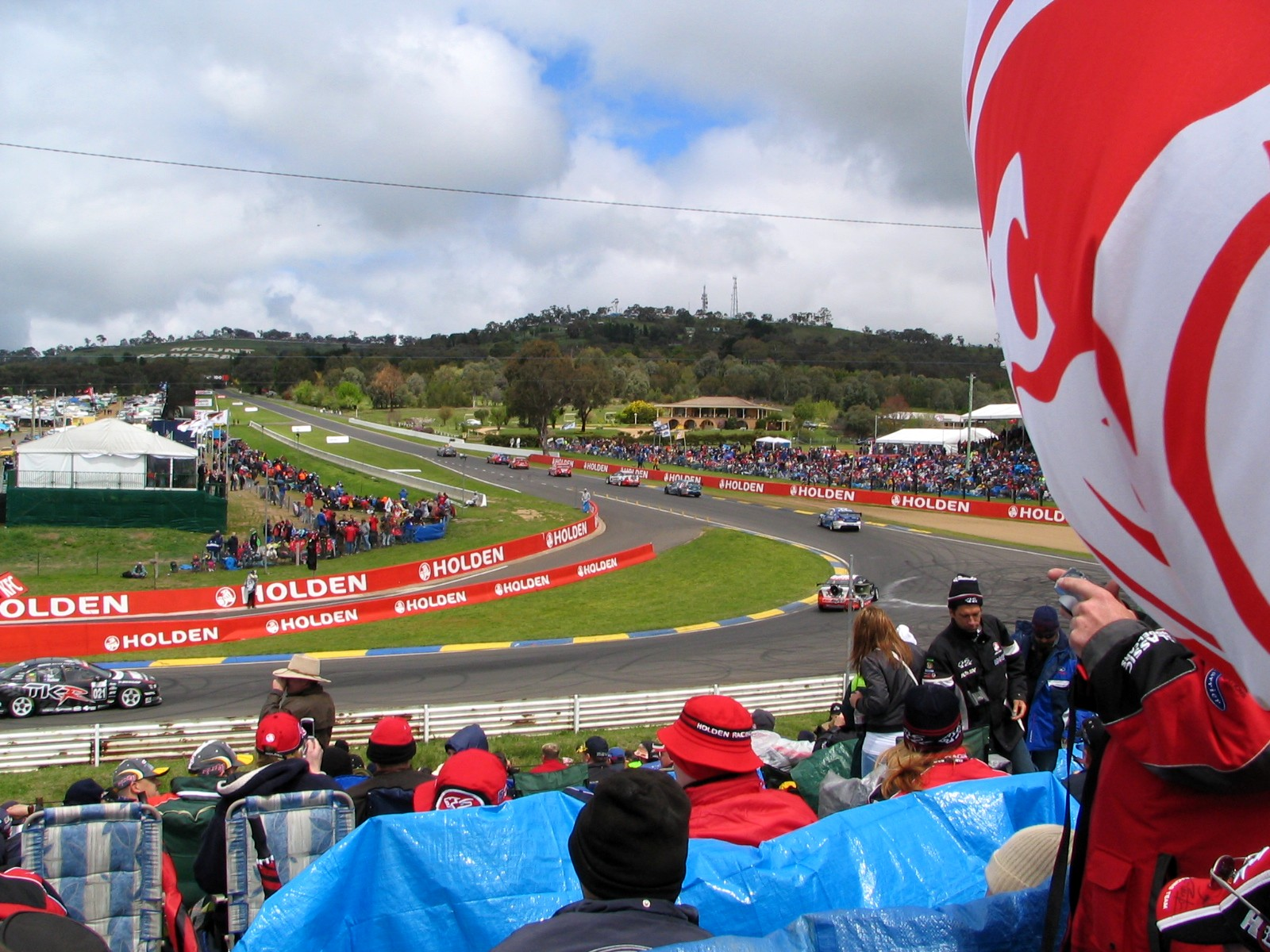
The Bathurst 1000.

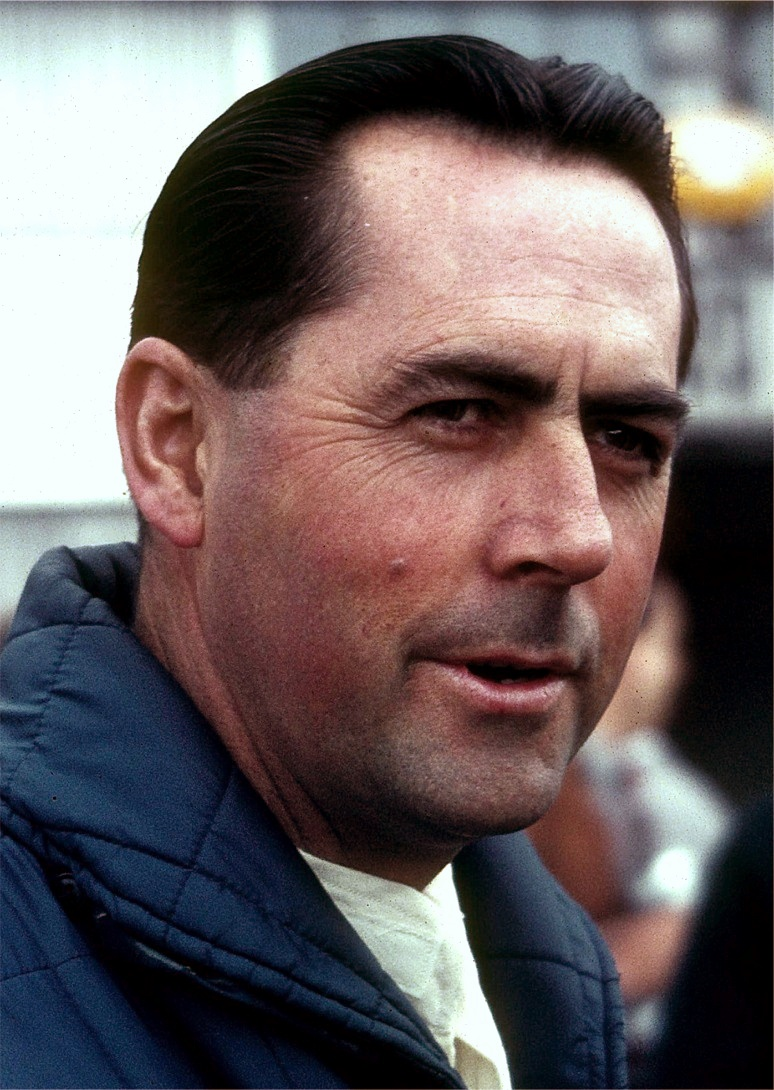
Jack Brabham is the most successful Australian driver in Formula One history. Brabham also set up his own team, the Brabham Racing Organisation, and won one of his world titles with them.

Motorsport is a popular spectator sport in Australia, although there are relatively few competitors compared to other sports due to the high costs of competing. The oldest motorsport competition in Australia is the Alpine Rally which was first staged in 1921 followed by the Australian Grand Prix, first staged in 1928. The most widely watched motorsport category is Supercars, especially at the Bathurst 1000. Other classes in Australia include Australian GT, Formula 3 and Formula Ford (open wheel racing), Superbikes, as well as various forms (cars and bikes) of speedway racing.

Australia hosts a round of many major international series, including the Australian Grand Prix, a round of the FIA Formula One World Championship, Rally Australia, part of the FIA World Rally Championship, and the MotoGP Australian Motorcycle Grand Prix. Other international series, such as the World Superbike Championship, Speedway Grand Prix and Champ Car have held events in Australia.

== Open-wheel racing ==
=== Formula One ===
The most popular event is the Australian Grand Prix, currently held at Albert Park in Melbourne. It is attended by more than 300,000 spectators per year and attracts free-to-air metropolitan television ratings, of over 1 million viewers, and is televised internationally as part of the Formula One World Championship.

The Australian Grand Prix has been run continuously (with the exception of 1936 and 1940–46 due to World War II) since 1928, though it did not become a round of the Formula One World Championship until 1985. For the first 11 years of F1, the Australian Grand Prix was held on the Adelaide Street Circuit in Adelaide, South Australia, as the last round of the championship. Adelaide played host to several title deciders; for example, the 1986 title, where Alain Prost successfully defended his championship after Nigel Mansell's left rear tyre exploded; the 1994 title was also decided in controversial circumstances, after Michael Schumacher collided with his rival Damon Hill, putting both out of the race and giving Schumacher his first of seven Formula One World Drivers' Championships by one point. In 1993 it was announced that from 1996 the Grand Prix would move to Melbourne at the Albert Park Circuit, replacing Adelaide as the host city. The move to Melbourne also changed the race's position in the calendar, with the Grand Prix becoming the opening round of the championship, a position it held until the pandemic (with the exception of 2006 and 2010).

No Australian driver has won the Australian Grand Prix since Alan Jones won at Calder in 1980 driving his Williams FW07B-Ford, and no Australian has finished on the podium since John Smith finished second in 1983. Since becoming a round of the World Championship in 1985 only 6 Australian drivers have actually raced in the Australian Grand Prix. They are Alan Jones (1985–1986), David Brabham (1990, 1994), Mark Webber (2002–2013) Daniel Ricciardo (2012–2022, 2024), Oscar Piastri (2023–), and Jack Doohan (2025).

Two Australians have won the World Driver's Championship: Jack Brabham, who won the title on three occasions, including becoming the first (and so far only) driver to win the World Championship in a car of his own design, manufacture and name when he won his final championship in 1966 driving the Repco V8 powered Brabham BT19 and BT20; and Alan Jones, who won in 1980, giving Williams its first Drivers' and Constructors' championships. As of 2026, Oscar Piastri (McLaren F1 Team) is the only starting Australian driver in Formula One. Of the 14 Australians who have driven in Formula One, only Brabham (14), Jones (12), Webber (9), Piastri (9) and Ricciardo (8) have won a Formula One Grand Prix.

=== Formula Three ===
Australian Formula 3 has been the name applied to two distinctly different motor racing categories, separated by over twenty years. The original Australian Formula 3 was introduced in 1964 based on the FIA Formula 3 of the period and intended as a cost-efficient open wheel category to run at state level for amateur racers. It was discontinued at the end of 1977. Formula 3 was reintroduced to Australia in 1999, again based on FIA Formula 3. An Australian Formula 3 Championship was sanctioned by the Confederation of Australian Motor Sport for the first time in 2001. Following the withdrawal of national championship status, an Australian Formula 3 Premier Series was contested in 2016.

=== Formula Four ===
The Australian Formula 4 Championship is an Australian motor racing series for open-wheel cars complying with FIA Formula 4 regulations. The inaugural championship was contested in 2015. Formula 4 has been developed and certified by the FIA as the pre-eminent open-wheel development category across the globe; the critical step between elite junior karting, Formula 3 and ultimately Formula 1. Cameron McConville is the Category Director, with Karl Reindler as Driver Coach and Driving Standards Observer for the championship.

=== Formula Ford ===
The Australian Formula Ford Series is an Australian motor racing competition for drivers of Formula Ford racing cars, held annually since 1970. From 1970 until 1992, and again from 2014, it has been a national series. From 1993 until 2013, the series was CAMS sanctioned and called the Australian Formula Ford Championship.

=== Karting ===
Karting in Australia is undertaken on bitumen, dirt and speedway circuits. Consequently kart racing has a variety of administration bodies each holding their own national, state or local competitions. Karting is sometimes seen as a stepping stone to other classes of motorsport however it is also a class of motorsport pursued as a career because it is the most affordable, pure and fun form of motorsport.

== Defunct series ==
=== IndyCar ===
Australia hosted the Gold Coast Indy 300 at the Surfers Paradise Street Circuit from 1991 to 2008. The race was part of the CART series from 1991 until its final season in 2003, and part of the Champ Car World Series, the successor to CART, from 2004 to 2007. The final race to date at the circuit was an exhibition race under the sanctioning of the IndyCar Series, which had merged with the Champ Car World Series shortly before its 2008 season began. Australian Will Power is a two-time champion in the IndyCar Series, having won in 2014 and 2022. Ryan Briscoe drove in the IndyCar Series from 2005 to 2015, winning eight races, including the final race at Surfers Paradise.

=== A1GP ===
Australia competed in the A1 Grand Prix championship from the series' establishment in 2005 until the end of its final season in 2009. Will Power was the most successful of the five drivers who have represented Team Australia to date, with a best result of second in the feature race at the series' inaugural round at Brands Hatch in 2005. Australia also hosted a round of the championship at Eastern Creek Raceway for the first three A1GP seasons.

=== Superspeedway ===
From 1987 until 2001, the Australian Superspeedway series was held with both NASCAR and AUSCAR racing. Short track speedway racing on paved oval tracks in Australia had proved popular in the 1970s and 1980s with capacity crowds regularly seen at tracks such as the Liverpool Speedway in western Sydney and at the Tralee Speedway just outside of Canberra. In 1987, former motor racer turned multi-million dollar tyre retailer Bob Jane opened the AU$54 million Calder Park Thunderdome in Melbourne, the first NASCAR style high banked oval track built outside of the United States. Initially races were held only at the high speed, 1.801 km (1.119 mi) Calder Park track, but soon also used the ½ mile Speedway Super Bowl located at the Jane owned Adelaide International Raceway as well as various road racing circuits on Australia's east coast. The NASCAR and AUSCAR series proved popular with crowds over the summer months with capacity attendances of up to 45,000 at Calder and 15,000 in Adelaide. AUSCAR ran from 1987 to 1999 while NASCAR series ran from 1989 to 2001.

== Circuit racing ==
=== Touring cars ===
In 1987, Australia hosted two rounds of the inaugural World Touring Car Championship for Group A touring cars. These were the Bathurst 1000 at the Mount Panorama Circuit which was won by Australians Peter Brock (his 9th and last Bathurst 1000 victory), Peter McLeod and David Parsons driving a Holden Commodore. The other round was an on-off 500 km race held on a combined road/oval course at the Calder Park Raceway in Melbourne.

=== Supercars Championship ===
The Supercars Championship (known as the Repco Supercars Championship for sponsorship purposes and often shortened to just Supercars or its long-standing name V8 Supercars) is a touring car racing category based in Australia and run as an International Series under Fédération Internationale de l'Automobile (FIA) regulations.

Supercars events take place in all Australian states and the Northern Territory, with the Australian Capital Territory formerly holding the Canberra 400. An international round is held in New Zealand, while events have previously been held in China, Bahrain, the United Arab Emirates and the United States. A Melbourne 400 championship event is also held in support of the Australian Grand Prix. Race formats vary between each event with sprint races between 100 and 200 kilometres in length, street races between 125 and 250 kilometres in length, and two-driver endurance races held at Sandown, Bathurst and the Gold Coast. The series is broadcast in 137 countries and has an average event attendance of over 100,000, with over 250,000 people attending major events such as the Adelaide 500.

The vehicles used in the series are loosely based on road-going cars. Cars are custom made using a control chassis, with only certain body panels being common between the road cars and race cars. To ensure parity between each make of car, many control components are utilised. Starting in 1993, all cars were required to use a 5.0-litre naturally aspirated V8 engine. Originally only for Ford Falcons and Holden Commodores, the New Generation Supercar regulations, introduced in 2013, opened up the series to more manufacturers. Nissan were the first new manufacturer to commit to the series with four Nissan Altima L33s, followed by Erebus Motorsport with three Mercedes-Benz E63 AMGs. Volvo entered the series in 2014 with Garry Rogers Motorsport racing the Volvo S60. After the 2015 season, Erebus Motorsport discontinued their use of Mercedes-Benz E63 AMGs and elected to run Holden Commodores, ending Mercedes short spell in the category. A year later, Volvo withdrew their Volvo S60s, leaving Garry Rogers Motorsport to run Holden Commodores. In 2017, Supercars introduced the 'Gen2' rules, allowing for teams to utilise engines with 4 or 6 cylinders as well as turbochargers. This was the first time these engine configurations were made available since the end of the Group A era in 1992, however as of 2019 all teams still use 5.0-litre V8s. In 2019, the Ford Falcon XR8 was discontinued and was replaced by the Ford Mustang GT, though highly modified. This was the first time the Mustang had competed in the Australian touring car scene in 30 years. As of 2020, the only models left competing are Ford Mustang GTs and Holden ZB Commodores.

=== Sportscar racing ===
The Sandown Raceway in Melbourne also hosted a round of the World Sportscar Championship in both 1984 and 1988. The 1984 race was won by West German driver Stefan Bellof and England's Derek Bell in a factory backed Porsche 956B while the 1988 event was won by Frenchman Jean-Louis Schlesser and West Germany's Jochen Mass in a Sauber-Mercedes. Mark Webber was part of the team which won the 2015 FIA World Endurance Championship, alongside Germany's Timo Bernhard and New Zealander Brendon Hartley. Four Australian drivers have won arguably the world most prestigious motor racing event, the 24 Hours of Le Mans held on the Circuit de la Sarthe in France each June. They are Bernard Rubin (1928), Vern Schuppan (1983), Geoff Brabham (1993) and David Brabham (2009).

== Motorcycle racing ==
=== MotoGP ===
Casey Stoner was the 2007 and 2011 MotoGP World Champion. A round of the world series has been in Australia since 1989 and is held at the Phillip Island Grand Prix Circuit in October. The circuit also hosts a round of the World Superbike Championship. Australia has produced many top motorcycle riders with Stoner, Wayne Gardner, Troy Bayliss and Troy Corser all having won world championships in various classes, with five time 500cc world champion Mick Doohan regarded as one of the all-time greats.

=== Australian Superbikes ===
The Australian Superbike Championship is the leading motorcycle racing series in Australia. Organised by Motorcycling Australia, the championship, run for Superbike class racing motorcycles, has been run each year since 1987. The series was known in its first two years as the Australian Endurance Championship before adopting the Australian Superbike Championship title in 1989. The series has produced a string of top motorcycling talent, including future World Champion, Troy Corser and multiple AMA champion Mat Mladin. The series has several times over the years attempted to bolster its image by running as a support category at car racing events like the Australian Touring Car Championship and with V8 Supercars, as well as the Australian motorcycle Grand Prix. It has frequently provided wild card riders for the Australian hosted rounds of the Superbike World Championship allowing emerging stars to showcase themselves against world class riders. This has helped in the past Mick Doohan, Troy Bayliss and Anthony Gobert launch international careers.

In 2010 a split in Superbike racing saw the creation of a rival series called Formula Xtreme, later known as the Australian FX-Superbike Championship. Attempts to merge the two series for the 2012 season broke down. Support for the ASC has declined in favour of the AFSC and manufacturer supported teams (like Yamaha) were amongst the first.

== Rallying ==
=== World Rally Championship ===
Australia has hosted a round of the World Rally Championship from 1988 to 2006, Rally Australia, including the final round of the championship in 2004 and 2005. In 2009, Rally Australia was moved to Kingscliff, NSW. Coffs Harbour hosted the WRC from 2011 and 2013–19.

=== Australian Rally Championship ===
The Australian Rally Championship (ARC) is Australia's leading off-road motor rally competition. A multi-event national championship has been held each year since 1968.

=== Alpine Rally ===
The Alpine Rally is Australia's oldest and longest running motorsport event having first run in 1921. It was started as a long-distance event to test the endurance of cars while opening up the North East of Victoria to tourism and was promoted by the state's leading automotive body, the Royal Automobile Club of Victoria. Over the years, the event transformed from an endurance event to a navigational trial and then in the sixties to a full on speed event that saw its inclusion into the new Australian Rally Championship of which it became an integral part of until waning interest saw it downgraded to state level with its last 2 runnings in 1998 and 2000 run as basically a club navigational trial.

In 2001, the Alpine was reinvigorated as a competitive historic car rally that was promoted by the Historic Rally Association with the regulations specifying that cars had to be non turbo, 2 wheel drive and at least 25 years old with the event itself being run as a route charted “blind” rally thereby being in the spirit of the original Alpines. Since 2001, the Alpine has been run on a bi annual basis but attracts over 250 expressions of interest each running with never less than 110 cars running competitively from all states and territories in Australia as well as competitors and cars coming from overseas to compete.

As of October 2019, the Alpine has run 64 times with 25 Australian Rally Champion drivers and navigators having their name on the winners trophy a total of 62 times. Frank Kilfoyle remains the only person to have won the Alpine both as a driver and navigator, having won it 5 times as a driver and once as a navigator. Greg Carr and Geoff Portman hold the record for winning drivers with 6 wins apiece. The most successful navigator / co-driver is Ross Runnalls with an astounding 9 wins.

The Alpine is heavily promoted via a free to air and cable television documentary that screens both in Australia and around the world after each running.

With the centenary Alpine in 2021 being cancelled due to COVID, the centenary Alpine Rally was postponed to early December 2022 from its now traditional base in Lakes Entrance, East Gippsland with the 2025 rally set to be held late November 2025.

== Off-road racing ==
=== Australian Off Road Championship ===
The Australian Off Road Championship (AORC) is an off-road-based rally championship held annually in Australia, with the inaugural event held in 1981. AORC events are defined as ‘long course’ events that are conducted on a track of no less than 15 kilometres in length, but are usually between 75 and 100 kilometres. The courses and tracks used for the AORC vary greatly and can be narrow, twisting and tree-lined, undulating farmland tracks, sand dunes and creek crossings, often incorporating man-made jumps and other obstacles.

Most events run over three days with scrutineering (safety checks on vehicles), prologue (short time trial to determine starting order for event proper) and racing over one to two days (usually split into Sections). Some events also feature a top ten shootout (opportunity for the ten fastest prologue vehicles to prologue again) and a dash for cash where the fastest two vehicles in each class race each other to win prize money. To enter vehicles must comply with regulations determined by the Confederation of Australian Motorsport (CAMS). There are ten classes for vehicles.

=== Australasian Safari ===
The Australasian Safari is an off-road motor sport racing event held in Australia. Like the Dakar Rally, the vehicle classes involved are motorcycles and cars, however there is no truck class. From 2008, a quad class was introduced. The event was first run in 1985 and has been held under the International Sporting Code of FIM and the General Competition Rules of Motorcycling Australia since 1999.

The event is usually held around the end of August, in the Australian winter, and covers approximately 5500 kilometres, mostly through the Outback in just over a week.

=== Boost Mobile Super Trucks ===
The Boost Mobile Super Trucks are the Australian-based championship of the American Stadium Super Trucks. The series consists of off-road trucks competing primarily on street circuits with ramps. In 2015, SST began racing in Australia as a support series to the Supercars. The effort was supported by driver Craig Dontas and Adelaide 500 general manager Nathan Cayzer. In May 2018, the series signed a three-year rights agreement with Boost Mobile that placed Australian operations under Cayzer and Paul Morris Motorsport. Later that year, however, CAMS suspended the series for safety reasons, and SST lost the ensuing legal battle.

CAMS ended the ban in 2019 and forged a new commercial rights deal with Gordon to place Australian SST races under the Boost Mobile Super Trucks name. The series began racing in 2020 as a separate championship to the American-based Speed Energy Stadium Super Trucks, though the two also shared companion races. The 2020 and 2021 seasons were heavily impacted by the COVID-19 pandemic which resulted in numerous races being postponed or cancelled.

The Boost Mobile Super Trucks' agreement to continue supporting Supercars expired in 2022. While Boost Mobile head Peter Adderton claimed the new Supercars ownership Race Australia Consolidated Enterprises saw little value in the trucks despite their popularity, Supercars CEO Shane Howard argued ATA Carnet import laws might have prevented the trucks from returning.

== Dirt track oval racing ==
=== Speedway bikes ===
Australia also hosts a round of the Speedway Grand Prix World Championship series for Motorcycle speedway. The first Speedway Grand Prix of Australia was held in 2002 at the Stadium Australia in Sydney. After being left off the SGP calendar between 2003 and 2014, the Grand Prix returned to Australia in 2015 at Melbourne's Docklands Stadium. Australia's first ever recorded motorsport World Champion was Sydney rider Lionel Van Praag who won the inaugural Speedway World Championship in 1936 at the Wembley Stadium in London, England. Australia has produced 5 Individual Speedway World Champions who have won 8 World Championships between them. Van Praag (1936), Bluey Wilkinson (1938), Jack Young (1951 and 1952 – Speedway's first dual champion), Jason Crump (2004, 2006 and 2009) and Chris Holder (2012). The Australian team has also won the motorcycle speedway World Team Cup / World Cup on 4 occasions (1976, 1999, 2001 and 2002). Australian riders have also been successful in the U/21 Speedway World Championship with wins for Steve Baker (1983), Leigh Adams (1992), Jason Crump (1995) and Darcy Ward (2009 and 2010).

=== Sidecar Speedway ===
Sidecar Speedway is believed to have originated in Australia and has been popular there ever since with the first Australian Championship taking place at the Exhibition Speedway in Melbourne in 1931. Ever since, sidecar speedway has been one of the most popular categories in Australian speedway at both capital city tracks such as the Sydney Showground Speedway, Brisbane Exhibition Ground, Rowley Park Speedway and the Claremont Speedway, while country tracks such as the Broken Hill Speedway, Olympic Park in Mildura and the Riverview Speedway in Murray Bridge have involved sidecars since the 1940s. Motorcycling Australia have also allowed riders from England to compete but no recent success has been recorded. Another big event is the Australian Pairs title, where the best riders from each state pair up and compete against other states. The Australian Pairs championship and the 'individual' championship are usually run on the same track over consecutive days.

=== Sprintcars ===
World Series Sprintcars is a dirt track racing series held in Australia for Sprintcars. It is the richest and best known Speedway series in Australia. The series was conceived by Adelaide based sedan driver and promoter John Hughes in 1986 as an Australian version of the famous World of Outlaws (WoO) series run in the United States since 1978. The WSS is separate from the single meeting Australian Sprintcar Championship and is currently run over 12 rounds during the Australian Speedway season. The championship is open to drivers of any nationality, and is usually held from December until February. As it is held during the North American off-season, many visiting stars from North America will make visits, some even racing the majority of races before the North American season begins. The first ever World Series Sprintcars (WSS) meeting was held in Perth at the now defunct Claremont Speedway on 1 December 1987.

The Lucas Oil Australian Sprintcar Championship is a dirt track racing championship held each year to determine the Australian national champion for winged sprint car racing. The single championship meeting runs in either late January or early February and has been held each year since the Windsor RSL Speedway in Sydney hosted the first championship in 1963. After the first nine championship meetings were held in New South Wales, the Sprintcar Control Council of Australia (SCCA) now holds the meeting in a different state on a rotational basis, with 1972 seeing the first championship held outside of NSW at the Premier Speedway in Warrnambool, Victoria. The Australian Sprintcar Title is only open to Australian drivers and is run and sanctioned by the SCCA.

== See also ==
- List of Australian motor racing series
