= Nonsectarian =

Lack of religious affiliation

Nonsectarian institutions are secular institutions or other organizations not affiliated with or restricted to a particular religious group.

== Academic sphere ==
Many North American universities identify themselves as being nonsectarian, such as Boston University, Cornell University, and Dalhousie University in Halifax, Nova Scotia, Canada. Some private primary and secondary schools in the United States also self-identify as being nonsectarian, such as Germantown Academy in Fort Washington, Pennsylvania, the oldest nonsectarian school in the United States.

Pi Lambda Phi is a college social fraternity founded by Frederick Manfred Werner, Louis Samter Levy, and Henry Mark Fisher at Yale University in 1895. It was founded as the first nonsectarian fraternity, "a fraternity in which all men were brothers, no matter what their religion; a fraternity in which ability, open-mindedness, farsightedness, and a progressive, forward-looking attitude would be recognized as the basic attributes." The first collegiate nonsectarian sorority to welcome women of all faiths and backgrounds was Phi Sigma Sigma. Founded by ten women on November 26, 1913, at Hunter College in New York, Phi Sigma Sigma now has chapters across the United States and Canada. Delta Phi Epsilon sorority, founded in 1917, was the first nonsectarian social sorority founded at a professional school.

=== Legal usage ===
A 1956 amendment to the Constitution of Virginia allowed for tuition grants to be paid by the state to nonsectarian private schools. Blaine amendments to thirty-eight state constitutions forbid direct government aid to educational institutions with a religious affiliation. The typical wording, "religious sects or denominations," is most often used to challenge support to Catholic parochial schools (38% of private school attendance); Protestant schools with an undifferentiated "Christian" often get a pass. These schools often claim both "nonsectarian" and "Christian" in their promotional materials. The United States Department of Education differentiates Christian from Conservative Christian in its analyses.

== Non-academic institutions ==
Organizations that are explicitly nonsectarian include the Apex Clubs of Australia, those participating in the Ethical Culture Movement, the National Jewish Medical and Research Center, and the Tibetan Buddhist Center of Philadelphia.

In Northern Ireland, nonsectarian refers to groups identifying themselves as neither Republican or Unionist, such as the Alliance Party of Northern Ireland, Green Party Northern Ireland, People Before Profit or the Police Service of Northern Ireland.

== See also ==
- Secularism
- Secularity
