= Deniliquin Ute Muster =

Annual Australian ute muster

- Nickname: Deni Ute Muster
- Genre: Ute muster, country music
- Date: Labour Day long weekend
- Frequency: annually
- Location: Deniliquin
- Coordinates: 35.505°S 144.995°E
- Country: Australia
- Inaugurated: October 1999; 27 years ago
- Next event: October 2, 2026; 33 days ago
- Organiser: Deniliquin Play on the Plains Festival Ltd
- Website: www.deniutemuster.com.au

The Deniliquin Ute Muster (Note: Also called the Deni Ute Muster) is an annual Australian ute muster held on the Labour Day long weekend in Deniliquin, New South Wales, originally hosted as part of the Deni Play on the Plains Festival. The inaugural event was held in October 1999.

It is the largest event of its kind. It brought more than A$13,000,000 (equivalent to $17,723,156 in 2022) into the town and region in 2009, and A$15,000,000 in 2025. The 2020 event was cancelled due to the COVID-19 pandemic, and was held virtually instead.

== Records ==
The ute muster has set Guinness World Records for the largest parade of legally registered utes and the most people wearing blue singlets: first set at the 1999 event at 2,839 for the largest parade of utes and 2009 for the most people in blue singlets at 2,230. In 2010 the blue singlets world record was broken at 3,500.

== Events ==
Entrance with "Deni Ute Muster" signage

The Deni Ute Muster includes events like whipcracking, rodeos, a country music festival and circle work, where drivers drift around an arena and are judged.

Starting in 2015 attendees are allowed to bring alcohol onto the site (no more than 30 cans of beer or pre-mixed spirits/no more than four litres of wine).

The town of Deniliquin has held a "Spirit of the Muster" event in the CBD of the town since 2023, preceding the Deni Ute Muster.

At the 2026 event new attraction were added: a trailer with video game consoles, a giant Guess Who? game, a magic show by Joey Presto, the comedian Jimmy Rees, and the comedic troupe Trash Test Dummies.

=== Music ===
The inaugural event featured a performance by Lee Kernaghan, with other Australian acts like Spiderbait and Jimmy Barnes also appearing in other years, and Keith Urban in 2016. The Australian children's music band The Wiggles performed their country music album Wiggle Up, Giddy Up at the 2025 event.

The 2026 event will have Tones and I has the headliner, with other acts including Amber Lawrence, Austin Mackay, Bella Mackenzie, Casey Barnes, Ethan Miller, Furnace and the Fundamentals, Ian Moss, Lee Kernaghan, Taylor Moss, Tori Darke, Troy Cassar-Daley, Tyler Braden, Sheppard, and Zac & George.

== Museum ==
The Deni Ute Muster Museum opened in 2021, its library features photographs of each year of the festival as well as newspapers, magazines and books that features the event. The Museum also exhibits two out of the 122 Isuzu Wasp utes exported to Australia.

Deniliquin Ute Muster Museum

Museum building exterior

Isuzu Wasp exhibit
