= Ute (vehicle) =

Vehicle with integrated cargo tray and passenger compartment

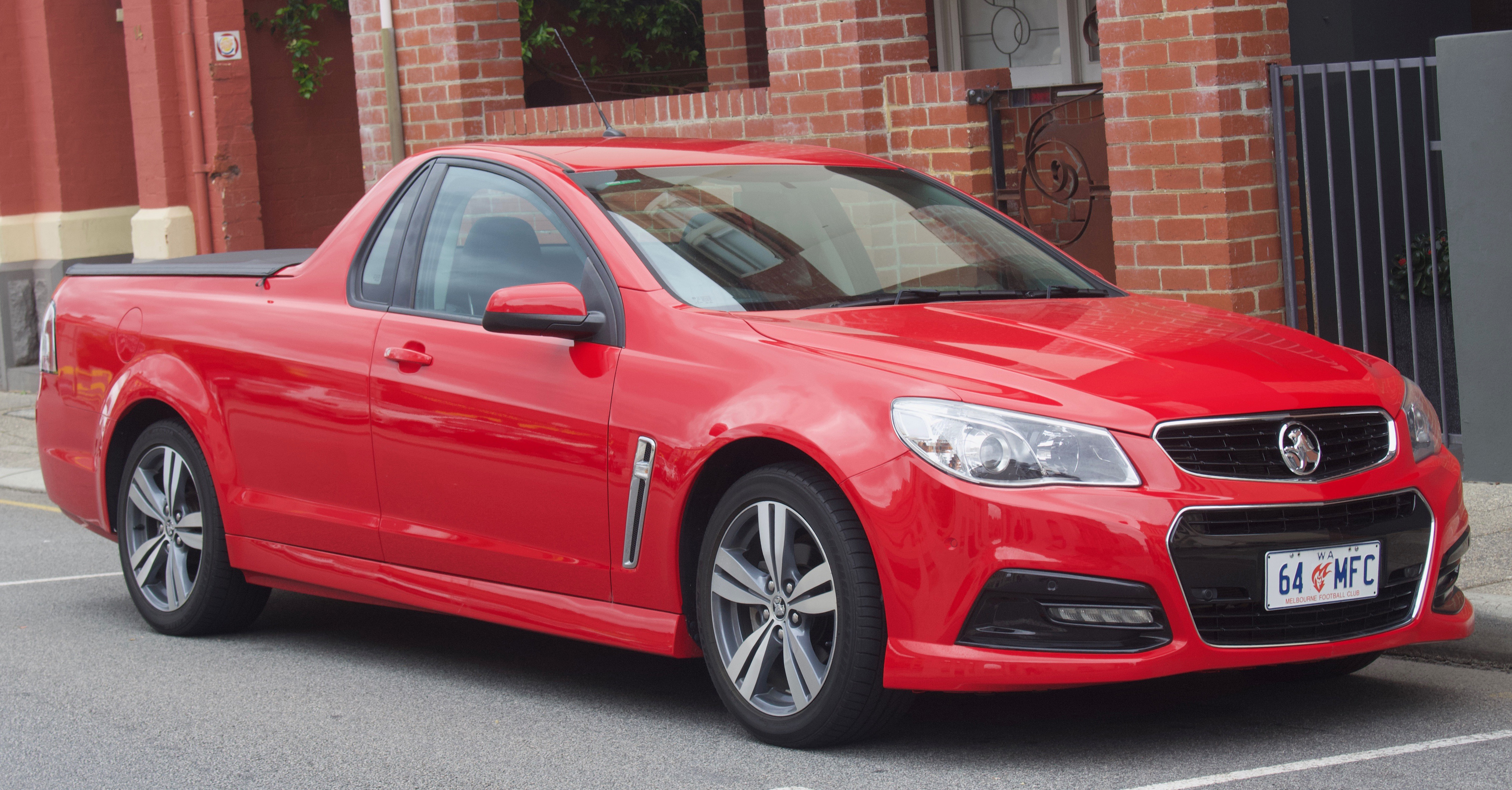
2014 Holden VF Commodore ute (coupé utility)

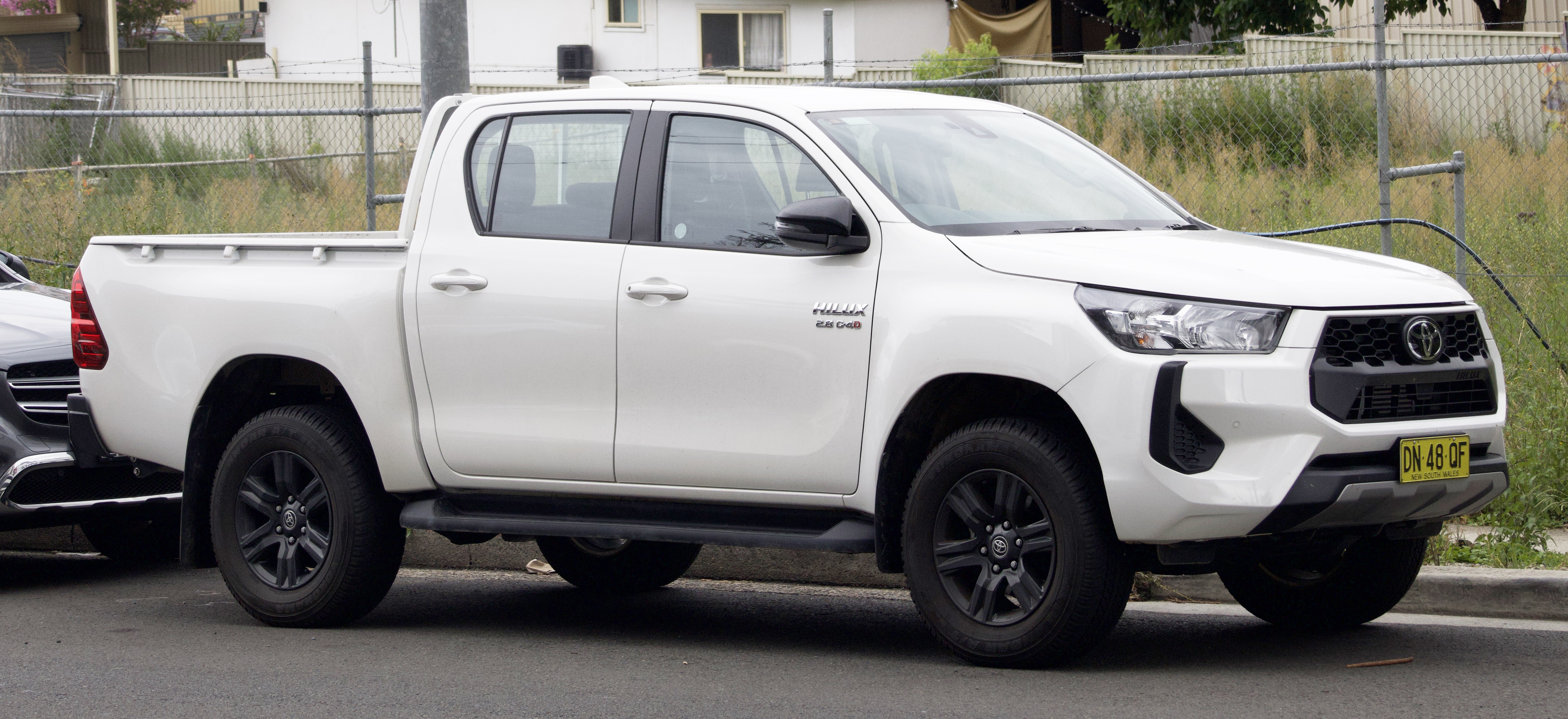
2024 Toyota Hilux ute (pickup truck)

A ute (/juːt/ YOOT), originally an abbreviation for "utility" or "coupé utility", is a term used in Australia and New Zealand to describe vehicles with a tonneau behind the passenger compartment, that can be driven with a regular driver's licence.

Traditionally, the term referred to vehicles built on passenger car chassis and with the cargo tray integrated with the passenger body (coupé utility vehicles). However, present-day usage of the term "ute" in Australian English and New Zealand English has expanded to include any vehicle with an open cargo area at the rear, which would be called a pickup truck in other countries.

Both wellside trays (factory-installed moulded SUV-style trays with fixed sides, also called tubs) and flat-bed trays (lower trays with removable sides, often installed by dealerships rather than the factory) are popular on utes in New Zealand, with wellsides more popular for in-city work and flat-beds more popular in rural contexts.

== Etymology ==
Historically, the term "ute" (short for 'utility vehicle') has been used to describe a 2-door vehicle based on a passenger car chassis, such as the Ford Ranchero, Holden Commodore, Australian Ford Falcon, Chevrolet El Camino and Subaru BRAT. Australian-produced utes were traditionally rear-wheel drive and with the cargo tray integrated with the passenger body (as opposed to a pickup truck, where the cargo tray is separated from the passenger body).

In the 21st century, the term has become more broadly used, for any vehicle with a cargo tray at the rear (which would be called a pickup truck in other countries).

== History ==
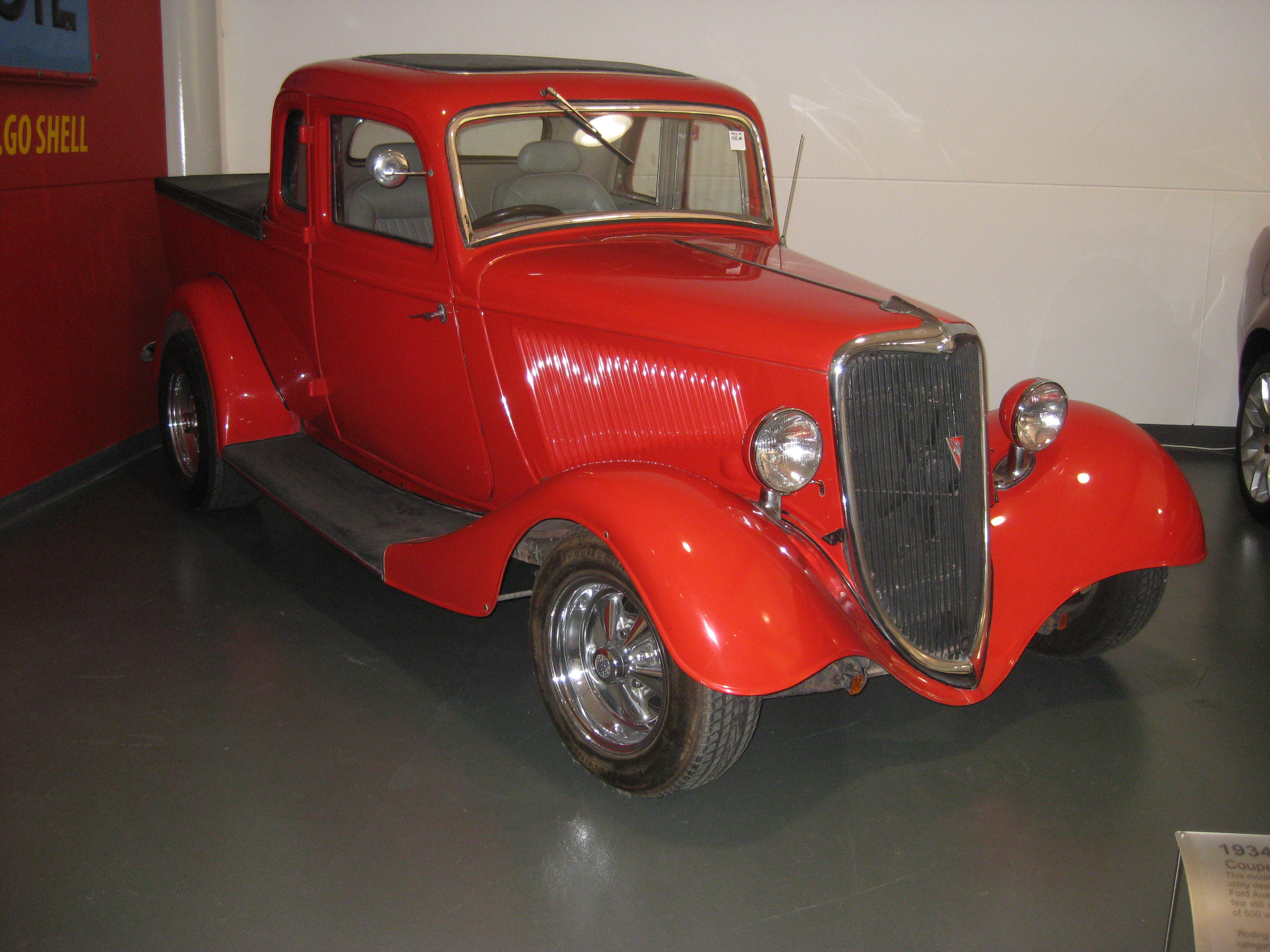
The first Australian ute: a 1934 Ford Australia Coupe Utility

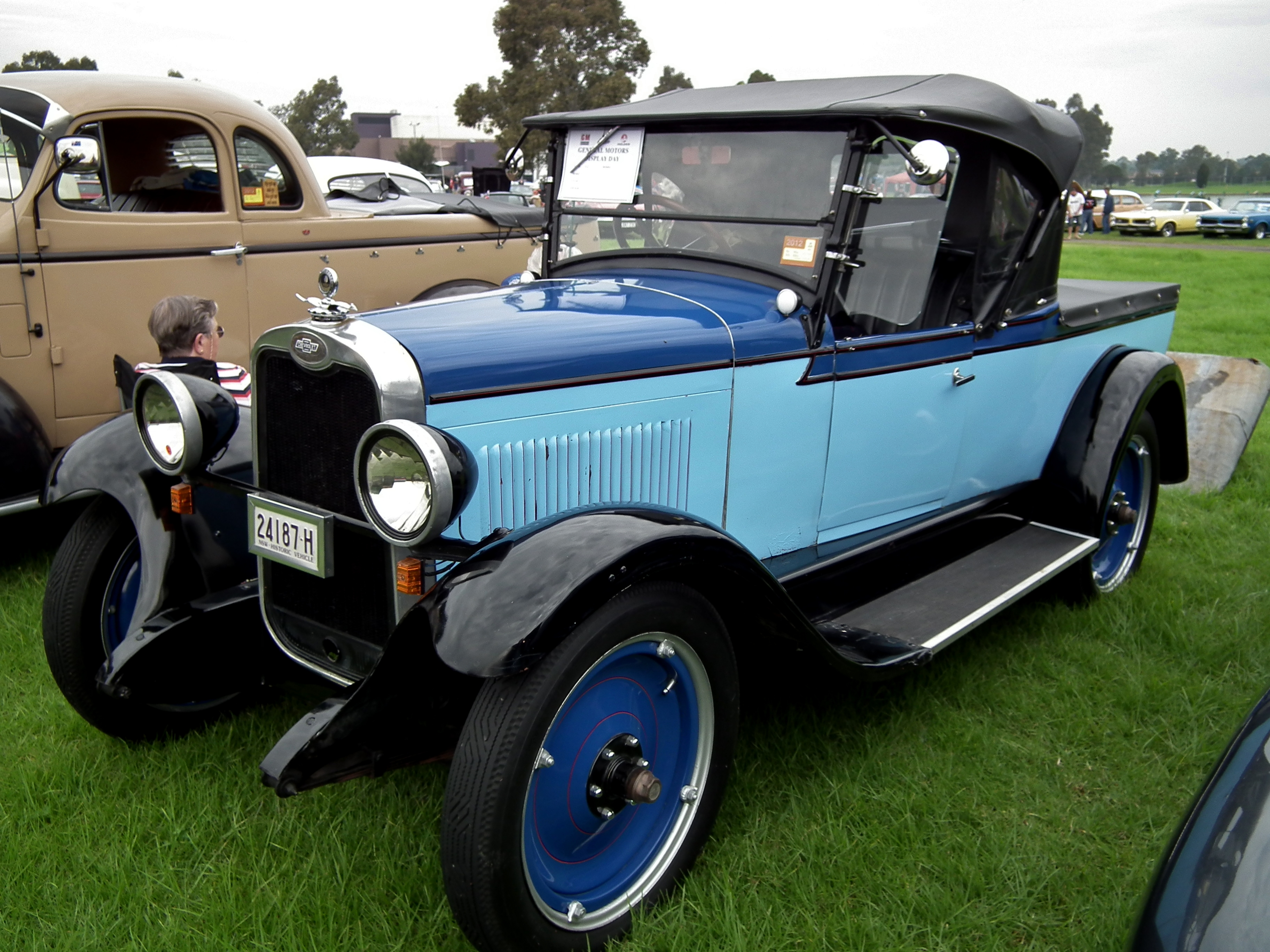
Roadster Utility: a 1927 Chevrolet National

The concept of a two-door vehicle based on a passenger car chassis with a tray at the rear began in the United States in the 1920s with the roadster utility (also called "roadster pickup" or "light delivery") models. These vehicles were soft-top convertibles, compared with the fixed steel roof used by most utes.

Ford Australia was the first company to produce an Australian Coupe ute, which was released in 1934. This was the result of a 1932 letter from the unnamed wife of a farmer in Australia asking for "a vehicle to go to church in on a Sunday and which can carry our pigs to market on Mondays". In response, Ford designer Lew Bandt designed a two-door body with a tray at the rear for the American Ford Model A chassis, and the model was named "coupe utility". When the Australian version was displayed in the US, Henry Ford nicknamed it the "Kangaroo Chaser". A convertible version, known as the roadster utility was produced in limited numbers by Ford in the 1930s.

In 1951, Holden released a "utility" model, which was based on the 48–215 sedan. With both Ford and Holden now producing utes, this started the long-standing tradition of Australian-designed two-door vehicles with a tray at the back, based on a passenger-car sedan chassis.

== Cultural impact ==
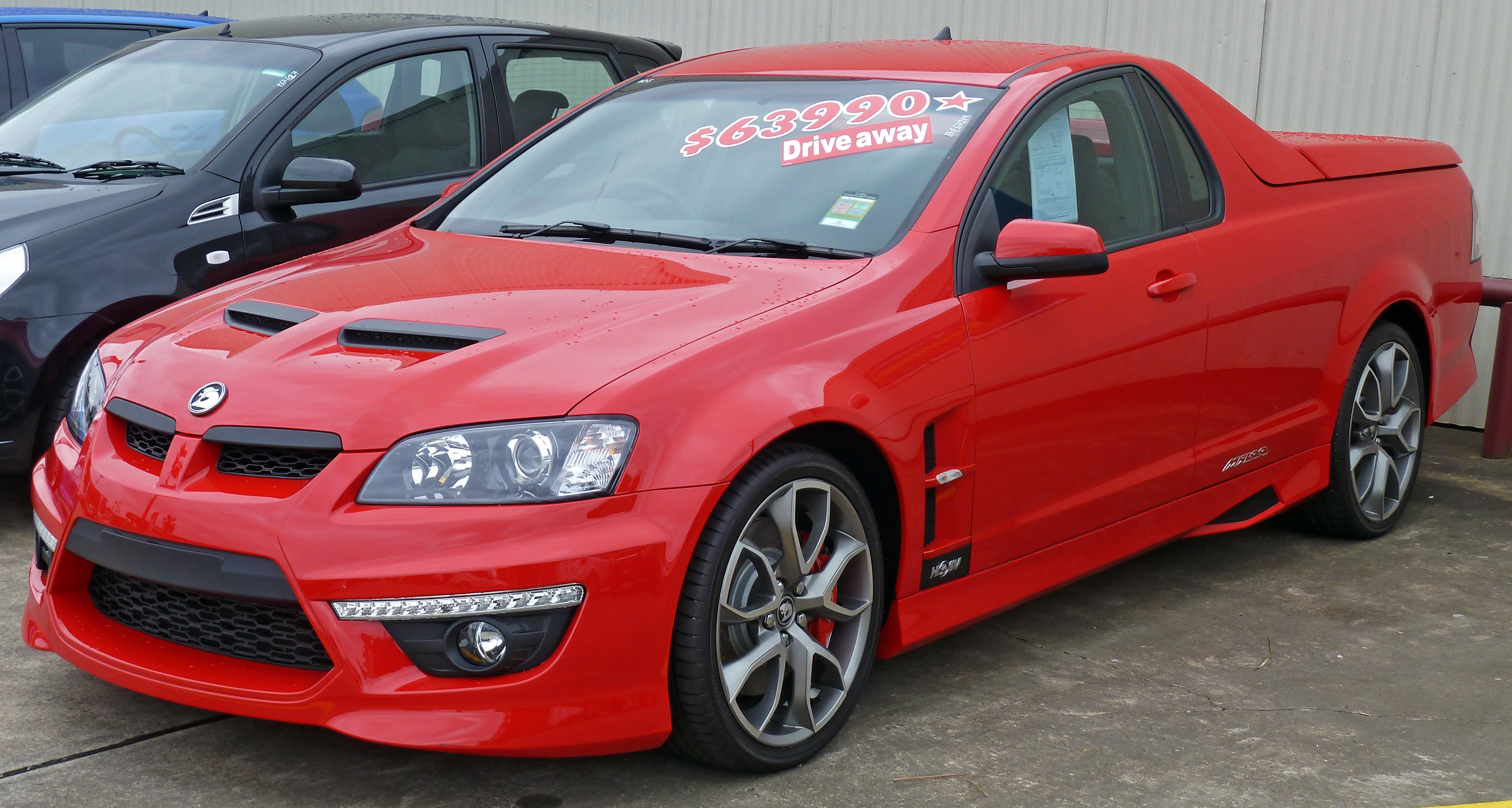
2010 HSV Maloo R8

Australia has developed a culture around utes, particularly in rural areas with events known as ute musters. It is common, particularly in rural areas, to customise utes in the "B&S style" with bullbars, spotlights, oversized mudflaps, exhaust pipe flaps and UHF aerials. Since 1999, the Deni Ute Muster has been held in the town of Deniliquin, which has become a major attraction for the area.

High performance utes were also sold in Australia, including the FPV F6 and the HSV Maloo. The 2017 HSV GTSR Maloo is powered by a 6.2 L (378 cu in) supercharged V8 engine producing 435 kW (583 hp).

The Australian V8 Utes is a racing series based on lightly modified production Holden and Ford utes.

== American models ==
Ford, Ram and Chevrolet export their full-size and full-size heavy duty (dually) pickup trucks to Australia. They partner up with local vehicle remanufacturers to convert them to right-hand drive. The customer may option their pickup truck to be de-rated so that it can be driven on a regular Australian car licence (max GVM of 4.5 tonnes or 5 short tons), instead of needing to get a truck licence.

The Greens party in Victoria has called for increased registration fees for American-sized pickup trucks in bid to deter people from buying them. Concerns exist around the suitability of such vehicles to Australian roads and parking infrastructure, the safety of other parties in pedestrian and multi-vehicle crashes, and the lower emissions standards that apply to heavy vehicles. Many American pick-ups weigh more than 3.5t, which classes them as Medium Goods (NB) vehicles, which are only required to comply with ADR 80/04 (based on Euro VI) rather than ADR 79/05 (based on Euro 6).

== Australian models ==
=== Ford ===
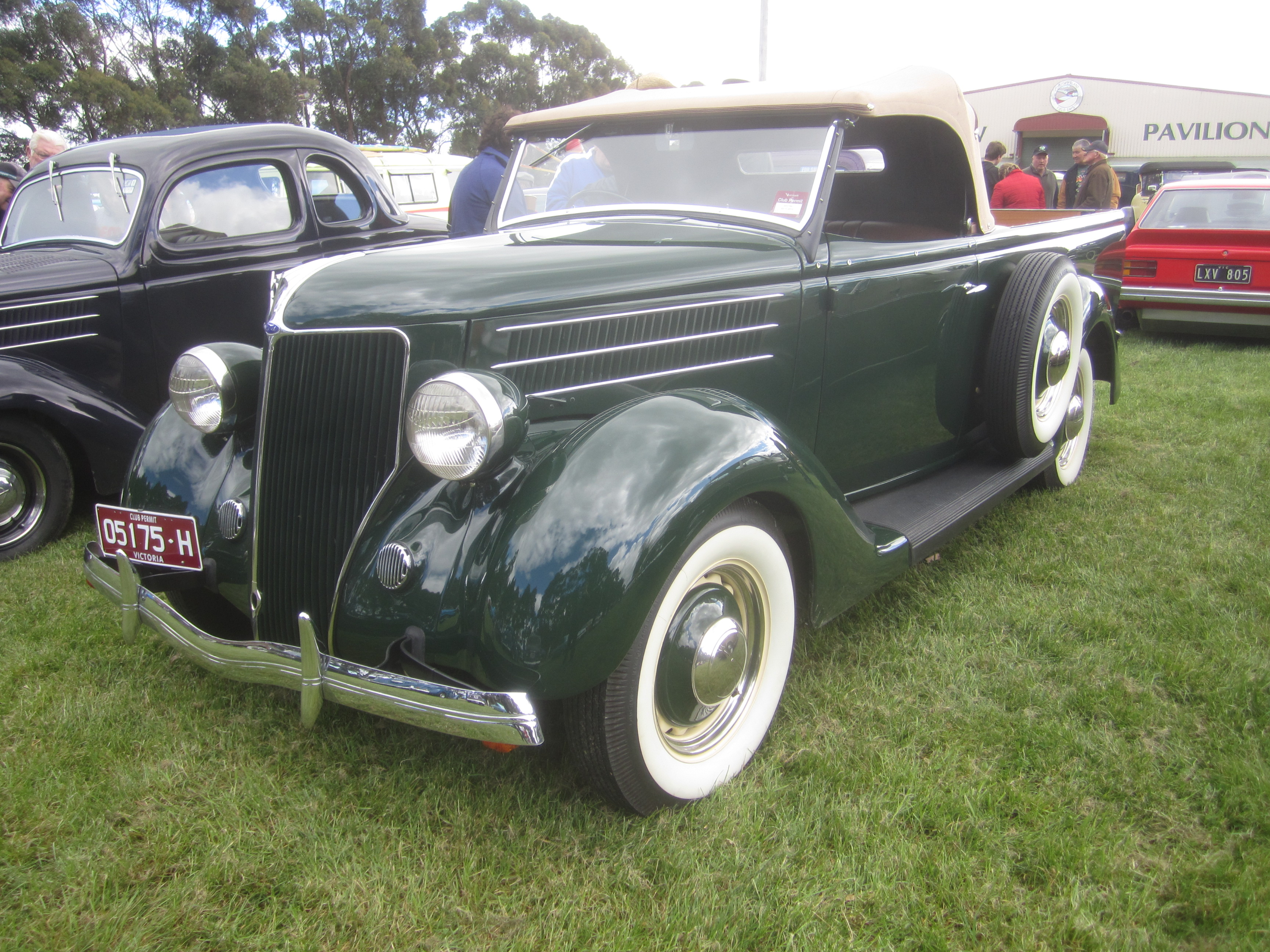
1936 Ford Model 48 coupé utility, with a roadster top

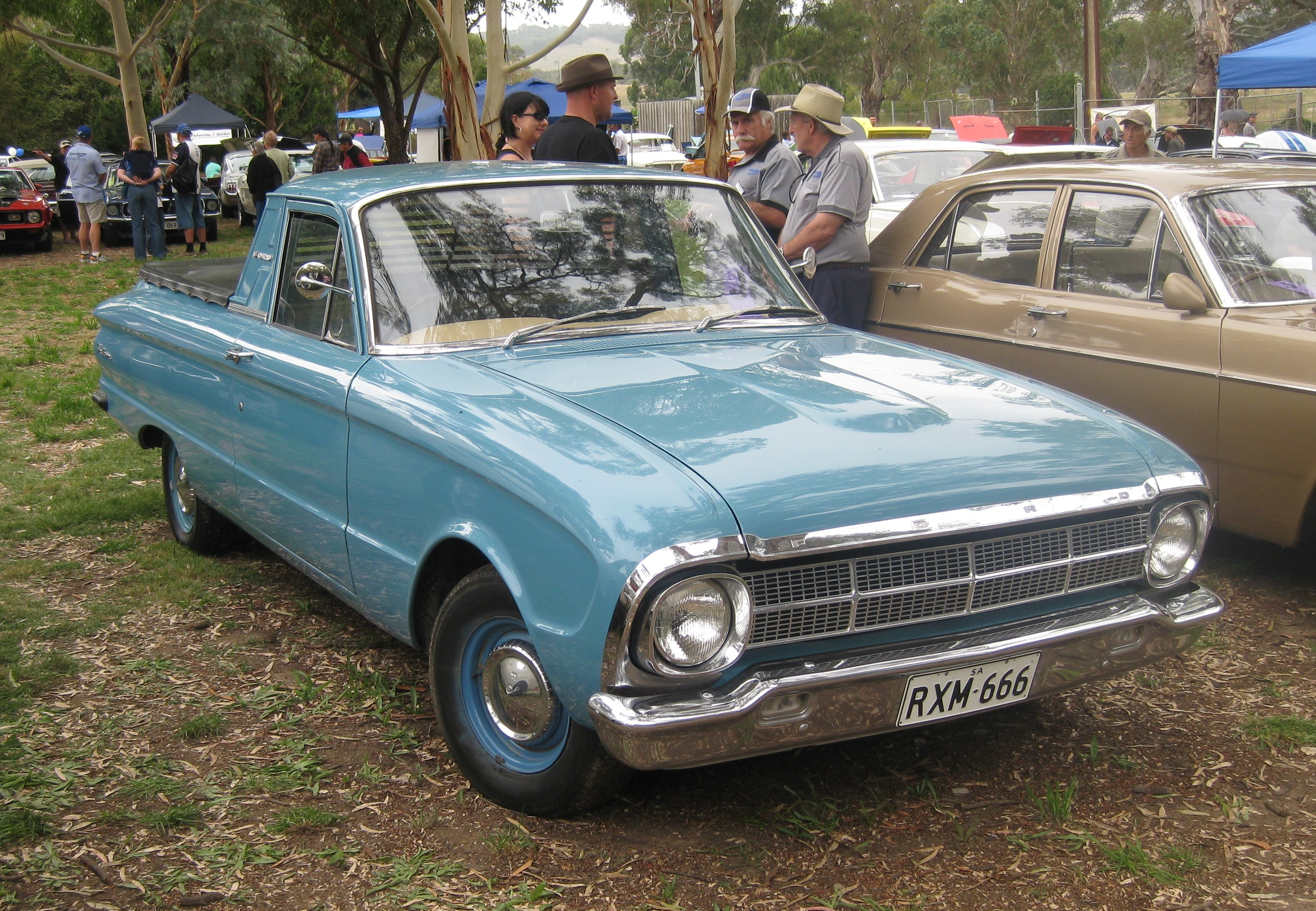
1964/65 Ford XM Falcon Utility

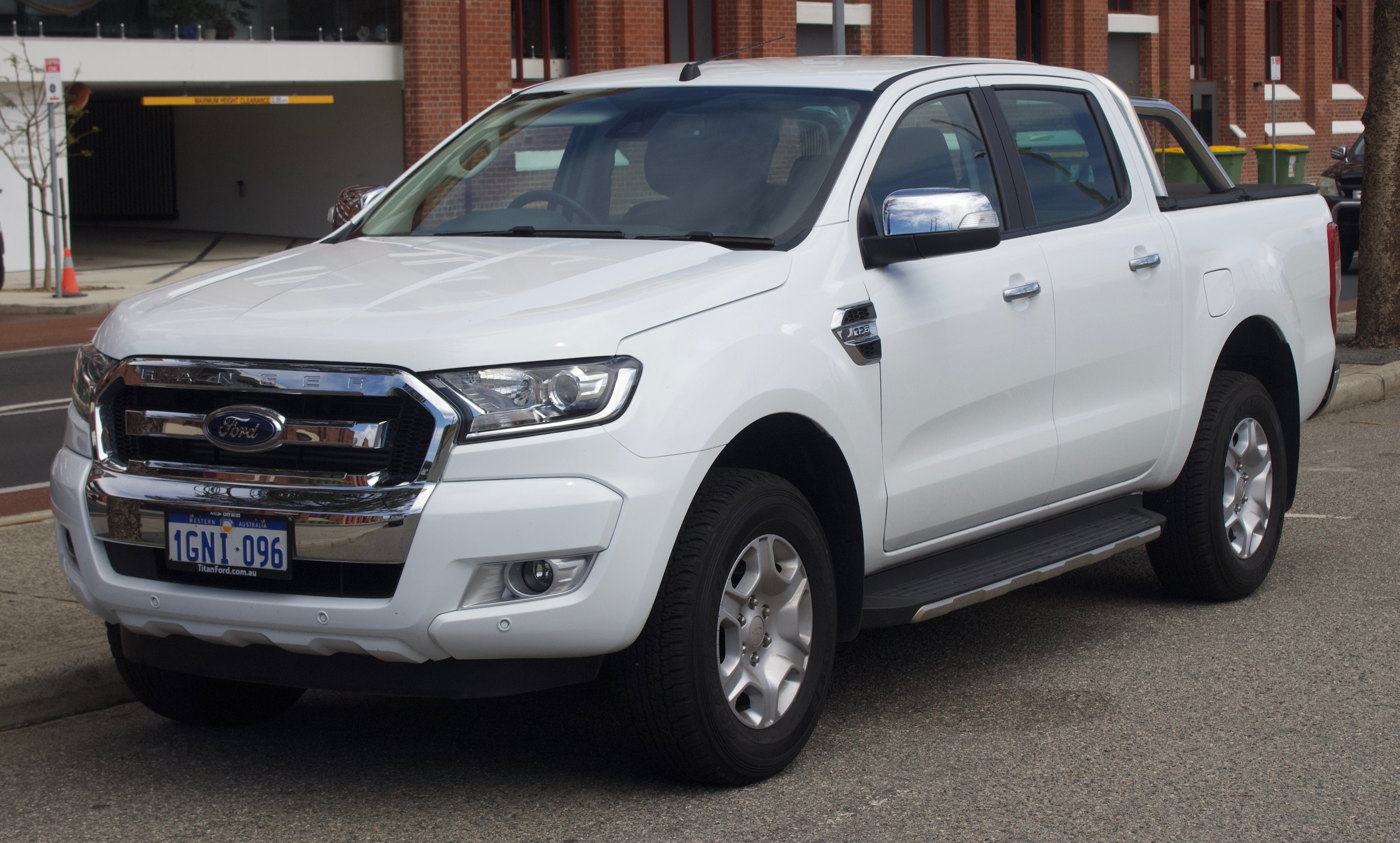
2018 Ford Ranger dual cab ute

The ute variant of the Ford Falcon was produced from 1961 to 2016. For the first 38 years of production, the design used a coupe ute style, but with the introduction of the 1999 AU Falcon, the Falcon ute switched to a cargo bed that is separate from the cabin, while still retaining the Falcon sedan front-end and cabin. The cargo bed was separated so that both "utility" and "cab chassis" body styles could be produced together.

Utes produced by Ford in Australia:

- 1941–1949 1941 Ford
- 1946–1953 Ford Prefect
- 1946–1953 Ford Anglia Coupe Utility
- 1949–1951 1949 Ford
- 1952–1959 Ford Mainline Utility
- 1953–1955 Ford Popular 103E
- 1956–1962 Ford Consul Mk.II
- 1956–1962 Ford Zephyr Mark II Coupe Utility
- 1961–2016 Ford Falcon Ute

In addition, the Ford Ranger (T6) was designed and engineered by Ford Australia, but built elsewhere. It was the best selling new car in Australia in 2023, 2024 and 2025.

=== Holden ===
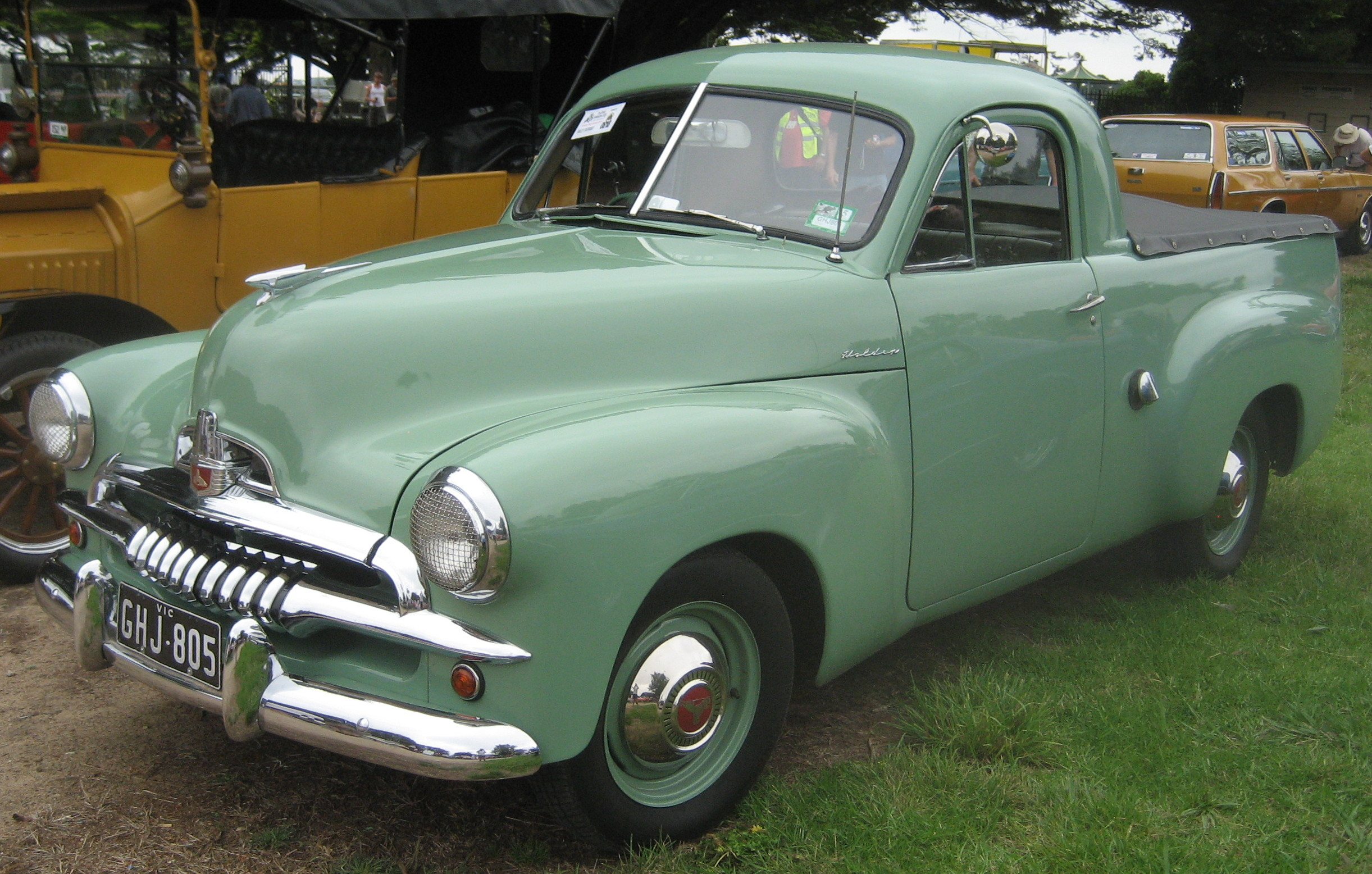
1953–1957 FJ Holden Ute

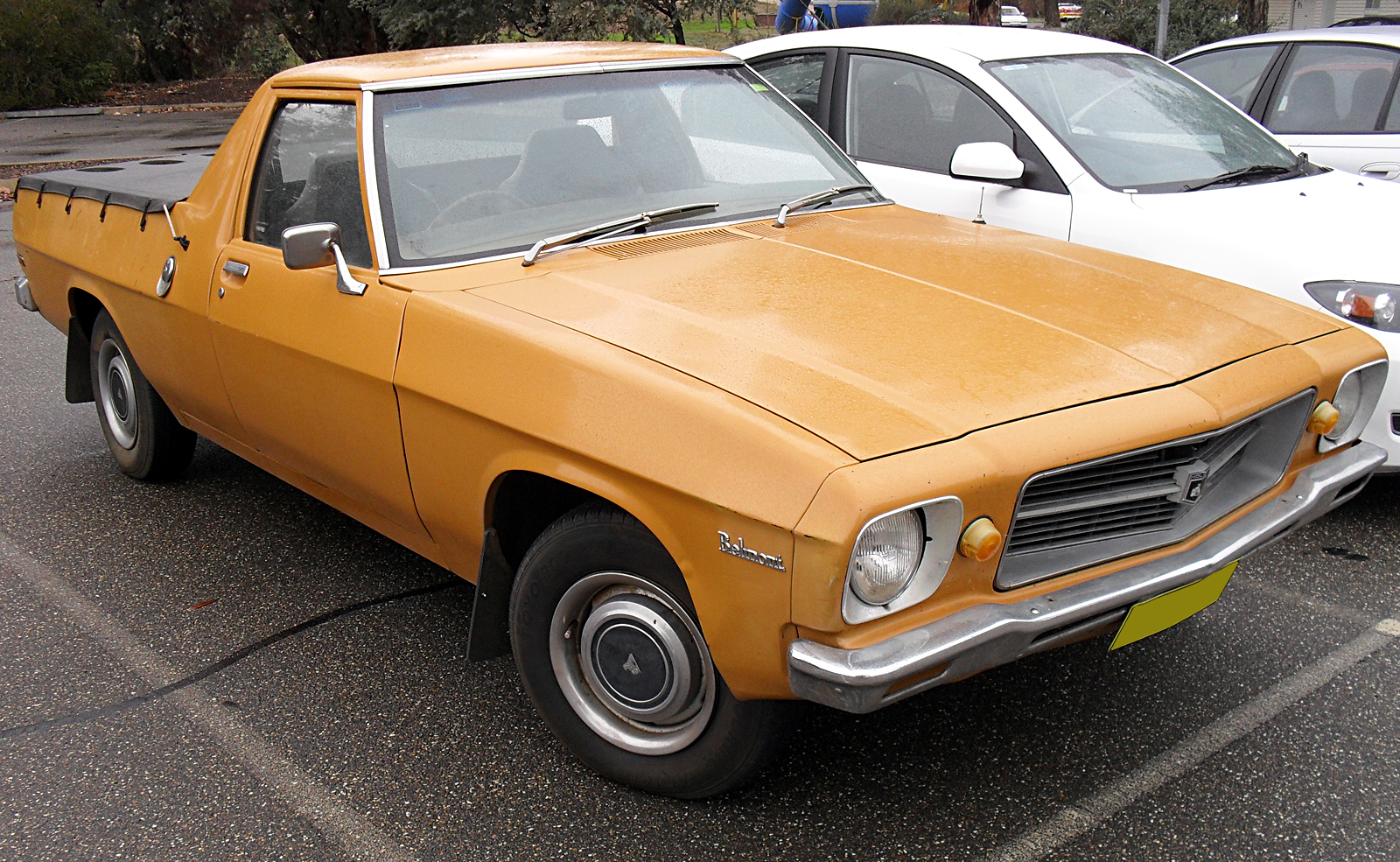
1971–1974 HQ Holden Ute

From 1951 to 1968, the "utility" was sold as part of the 48–215 to HR model ranges. From 1968 to 1984 the "utility" was included in the Holden Belmont/Kingswood range. In 1984, Holden discontinued the ute variant and it was not part of the VB to VL Commodore ranges. The model returned in 1990 based on the VN Commodore chassis and remained part of the model range until Australian production ended in 2017. In 2000, the Holden Commodore was the first Australian ute to feature independent rear suspension, the Ford Falcon ute retained a live axle rear suspension design until production ended in 2016.

In 2008, the VE Commodore Ute was proposed to be exported to North America as the Pontiac G8 ST. At least one prototype was built, but GM did not proceed with production due to the 2008 financial crisis.

Utes produced by Holden or its parent company General Motors in Australia:

- 1946–1948 Chevrolet Stylemaster
- 1951–1957 Vauxhall Velox
- 1951–1968 Holden Utility
- 1952–1954 Vauxhall Wyvern
- 1968–1984 Holden Kingswood
- 1990–1991 Holden Utility (VG)
- 1991–2017 Holden Ute / Holden Commodore Ute (VP to VF)
- 2003–2006 Holden Crewman

Holden also sold rebadged utes produced elsewhere. They include:

- 1980–2008 Holden Rodeo, rebadged Isuzu Faster and Isuzu D-Max.
- 2008–2020 Holden Colorado, rebadged Chevrolet Colorado built in Thailand.

=== Chrysler ===
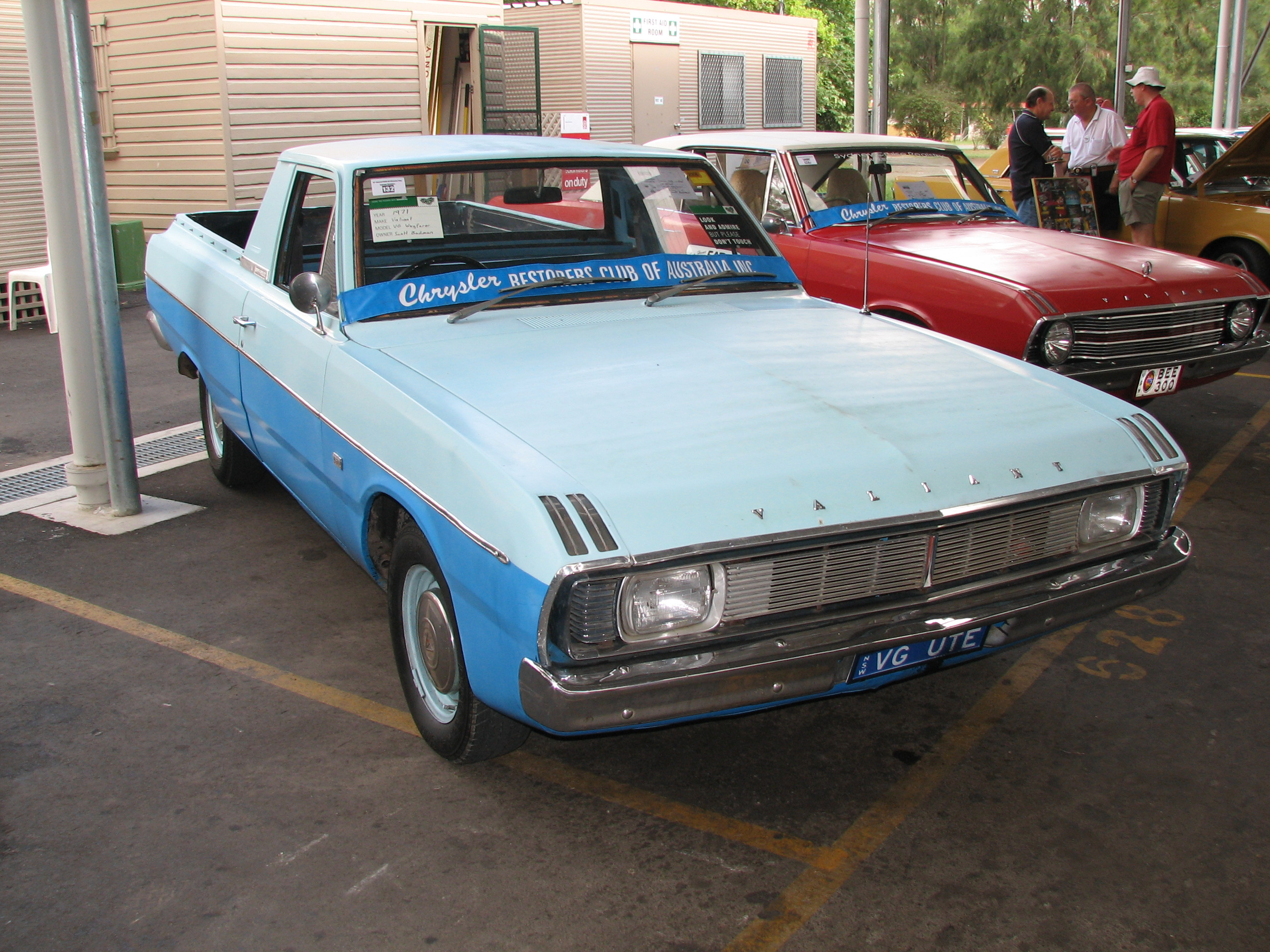
1970–1971 Chrysler Valiant VG Ute

Models:

- 1953–1957 Plymouth Belvedere
- 1956–1957 Plymouth Cranbrook
- 1956-1958 Plymouth Savoy
- 1956–1957 Dodge Kingsway
- 1956–1957 DeSoto Diplomat
- 1958–1961 Chrysler Wayfarer
- 1965–1979 Chrysler Valiant Utility and Dodge Utility

=== British Leyland ===
Models:

- 1954–1974 Austin Cambridge Coupe Utility
- 1968–1971 Austin 1800 Utility

=== Hillman ===
Models:

- 1950–1958 Commer Light Pick-up, based on the Hillman Minx
- 1956 Hillman de luxe Utility

== Asian models ==
=== Isuzu ===
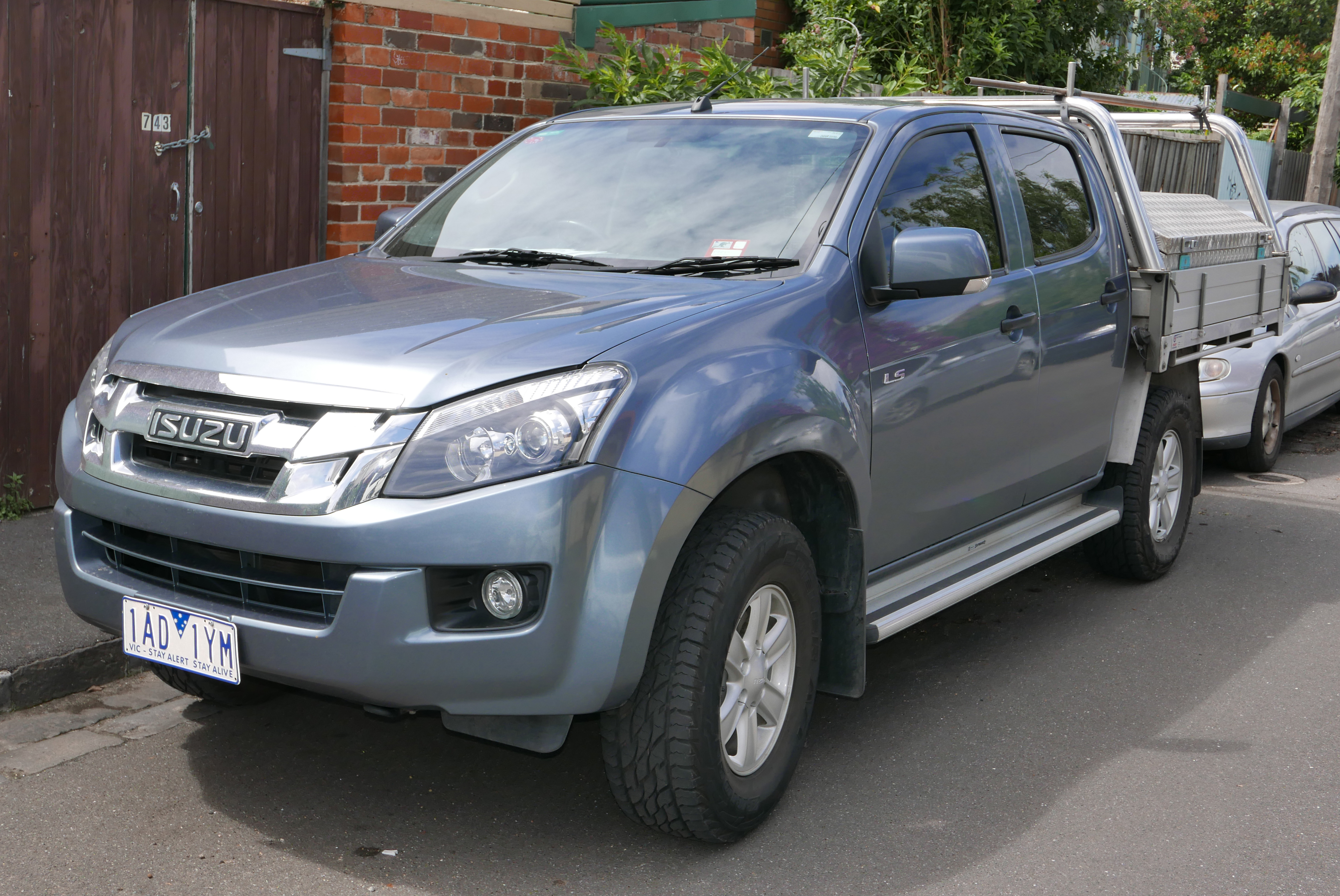
2013 Isuzu D-Max crew cab chassis

Isuzu sells the Isuzu D-Max in Australia. Previously, this vehicle was sold rebadged as the Holden Rodeo.

=== Kia ===
Kia Tasman is an mid-size ute produced by South Korean manufacturer Kia from 2025.

=== Mazda ===
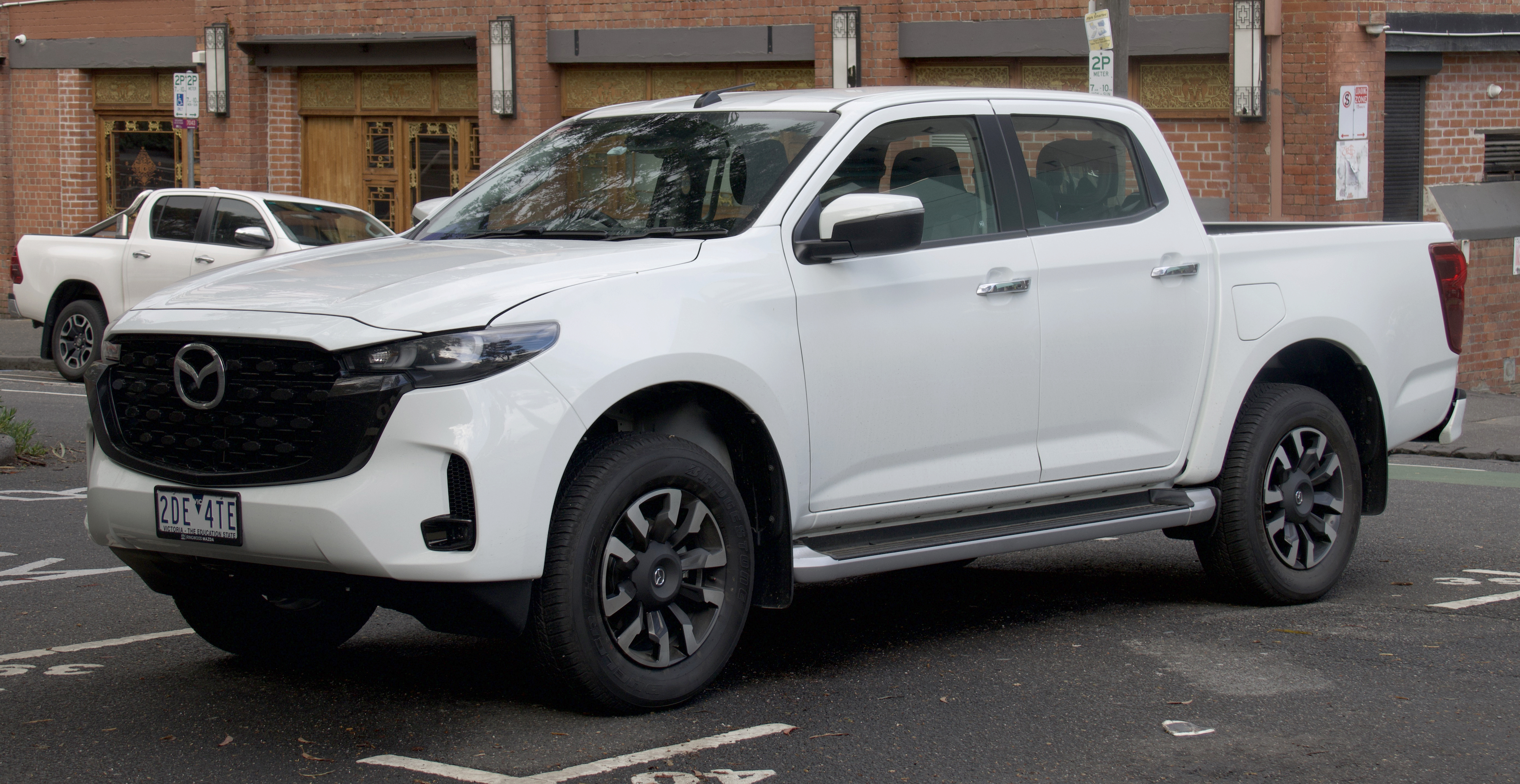
2025 Mazda BT-50

Mazda has sold the Mazda BT-50 in Australia since 2006.

=== Mitsubishi ===
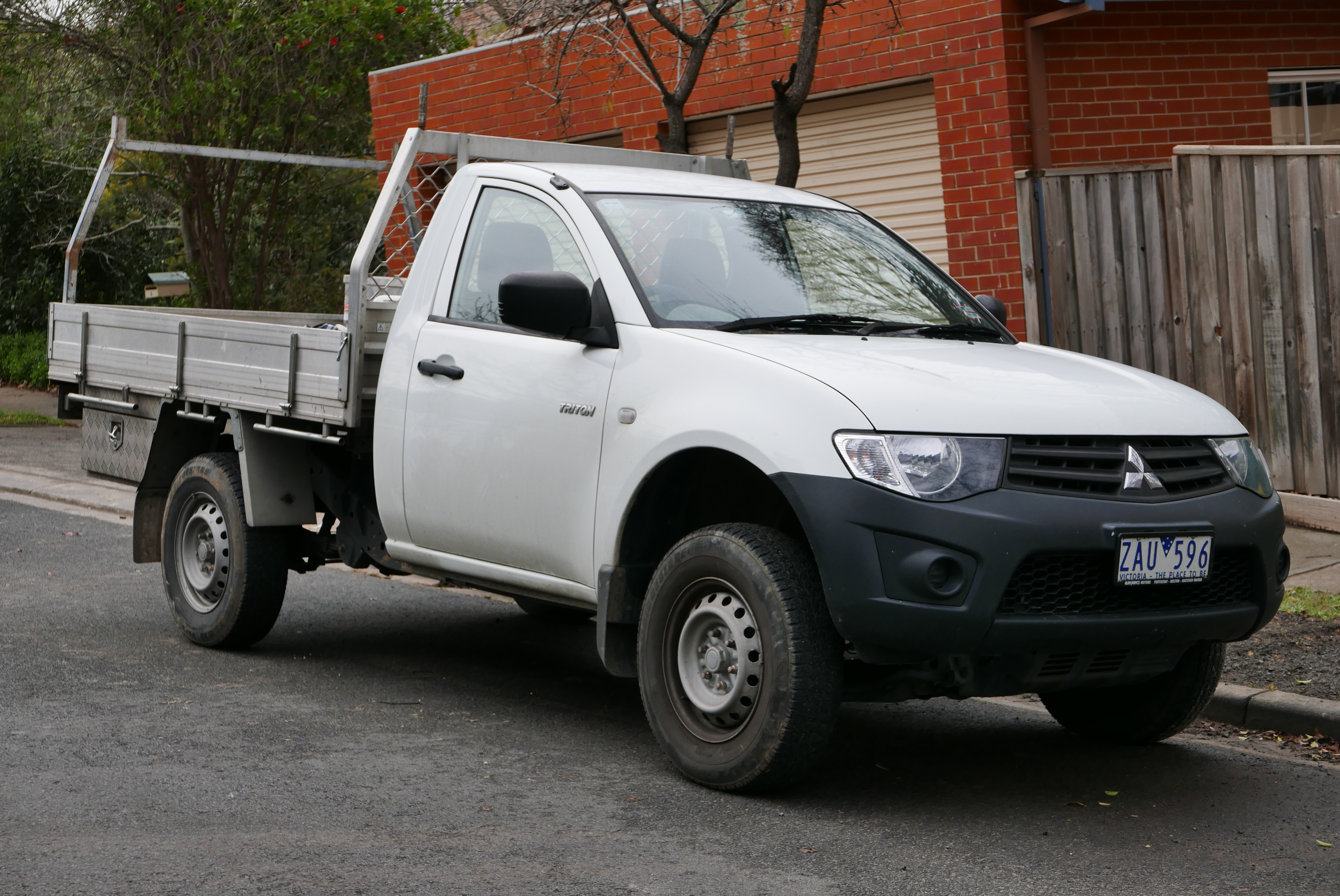
2012 Mitsubishi Triton cab chassis

Mitsubishi has sold the Mitsubishi Triton in Australia since 1978. In 2019, it was the fifth-best selling new car in Australia.

=== Nissan ===
Between 1971 and 2008, Nissan sold the Nissan Sunny Truck as a ute in Australia. Since 1985, Nissan has sold the Nissan Navara pickup-style ute in Australia.

=== Proton ===
Between 2002 and 2010, the Proton Jumbuck was sold in Australia as a ute.

=== Subaru ===
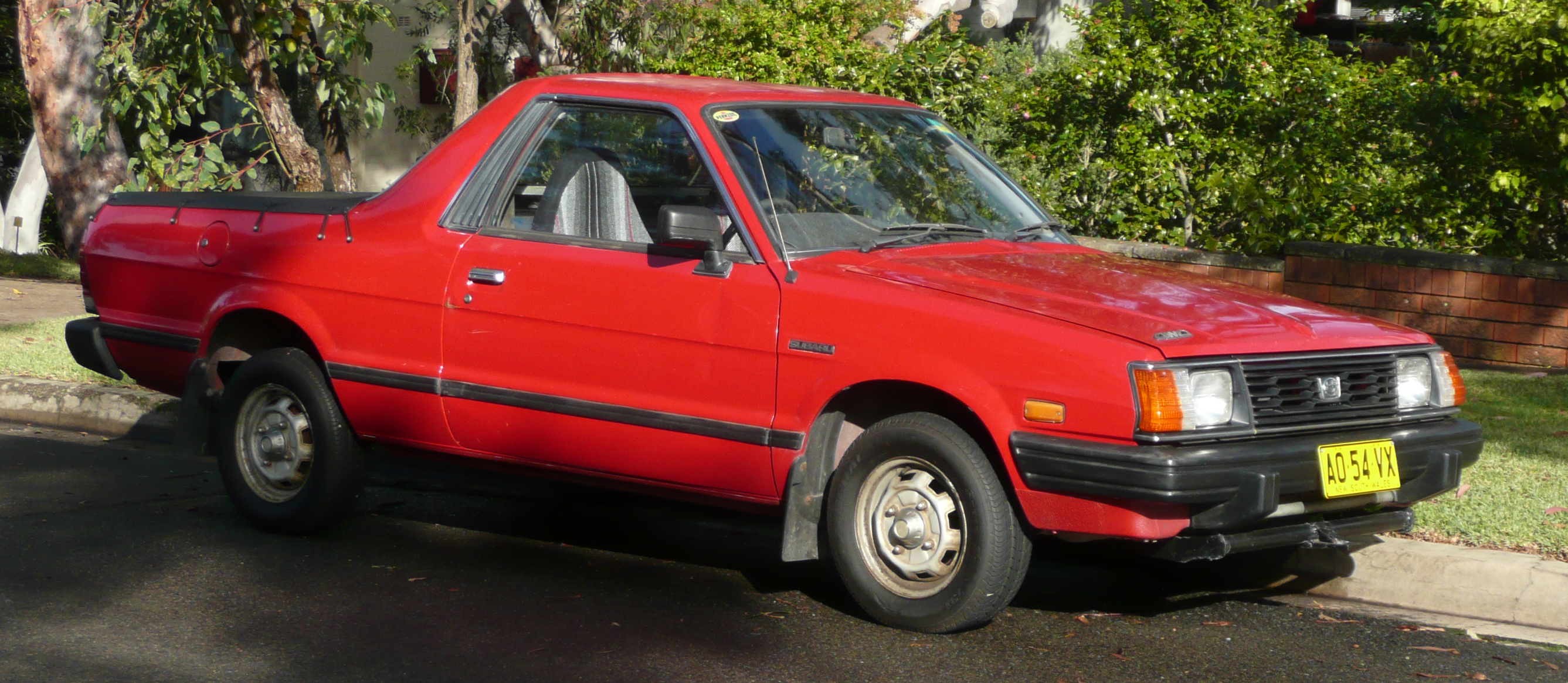
1989 Subaru Brumby

Subaru produced the Subaru Brumby, a small AWD model derived from the second generation Leone. It was sold between 1978 and 1993 and known as the BRAT, Shifter, MV, and Targa in countries other than Australia. It is relatively well known due to its long production life and use in popular culture. It was built in Japan, but never sold there.

=== Suzuki ===
From 1983 to 1988, Suzuki built a ute version of their Alto kei car called the Mighty Boy. It was sold in Japan, Australia, and Cyprus.

=== Toyota ===
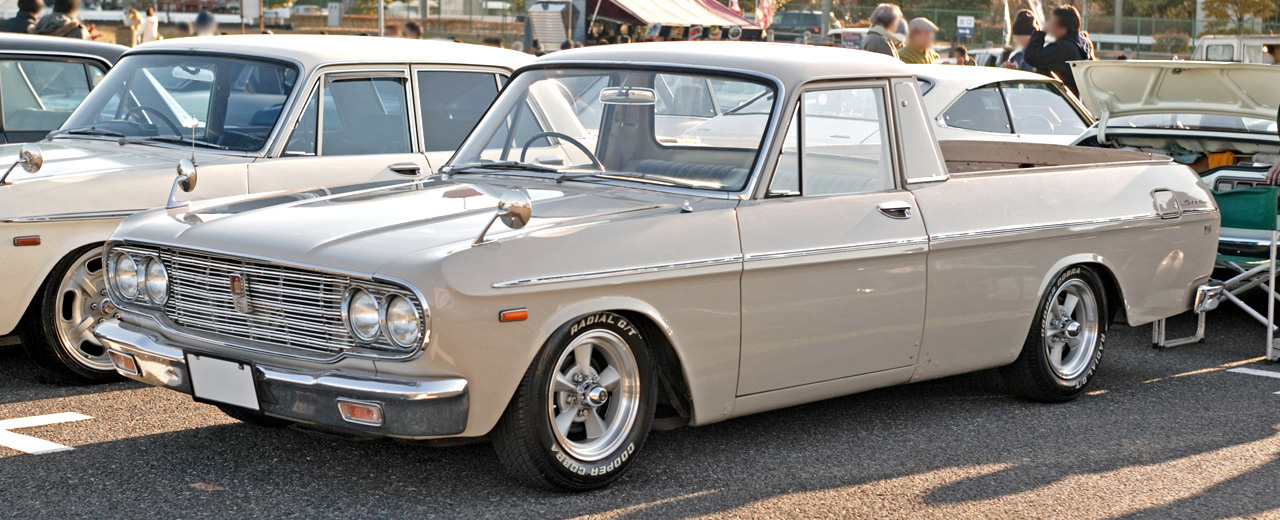
1962–1967 Toyota Crown utility

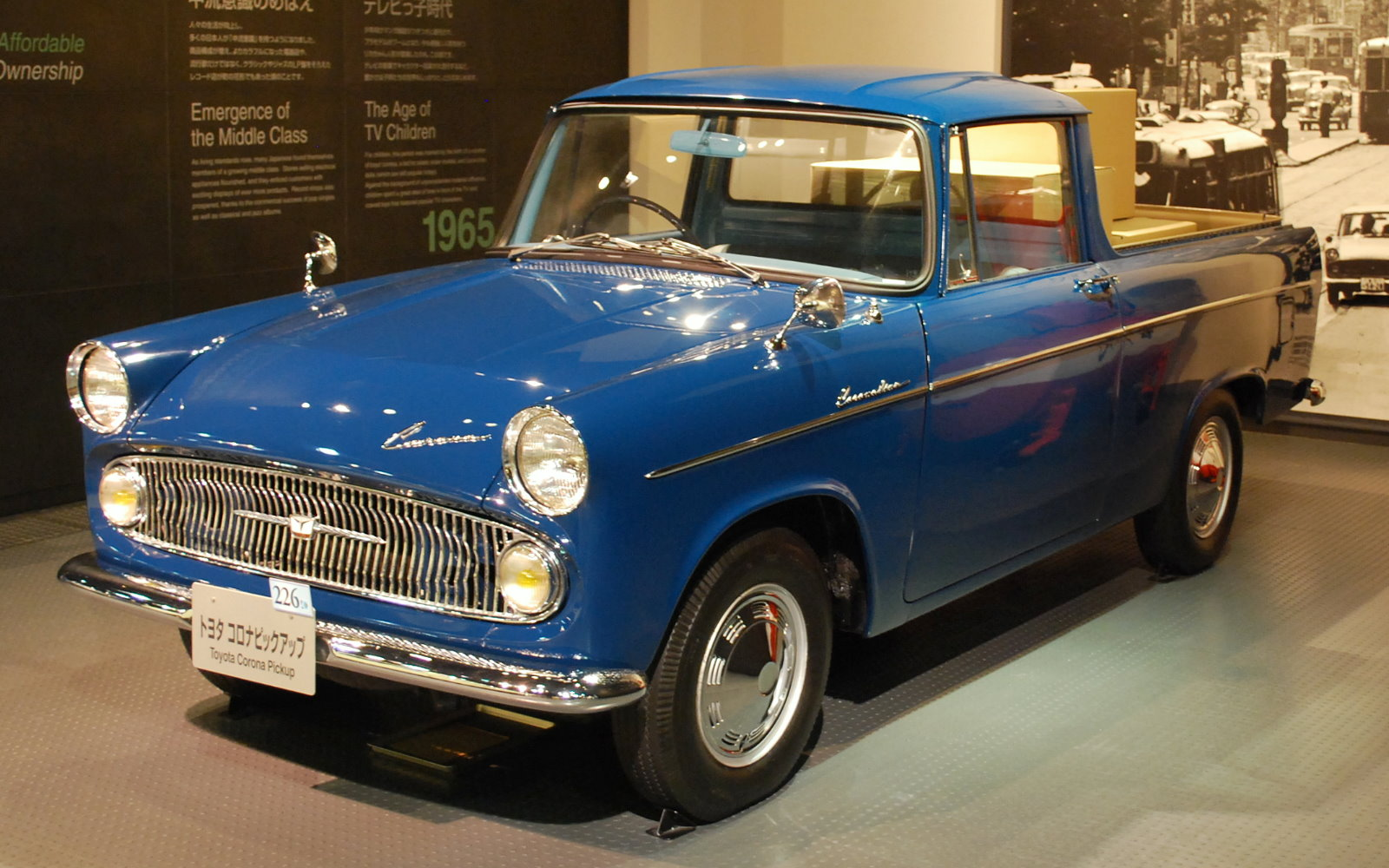
1962 Toyota Corona pickup

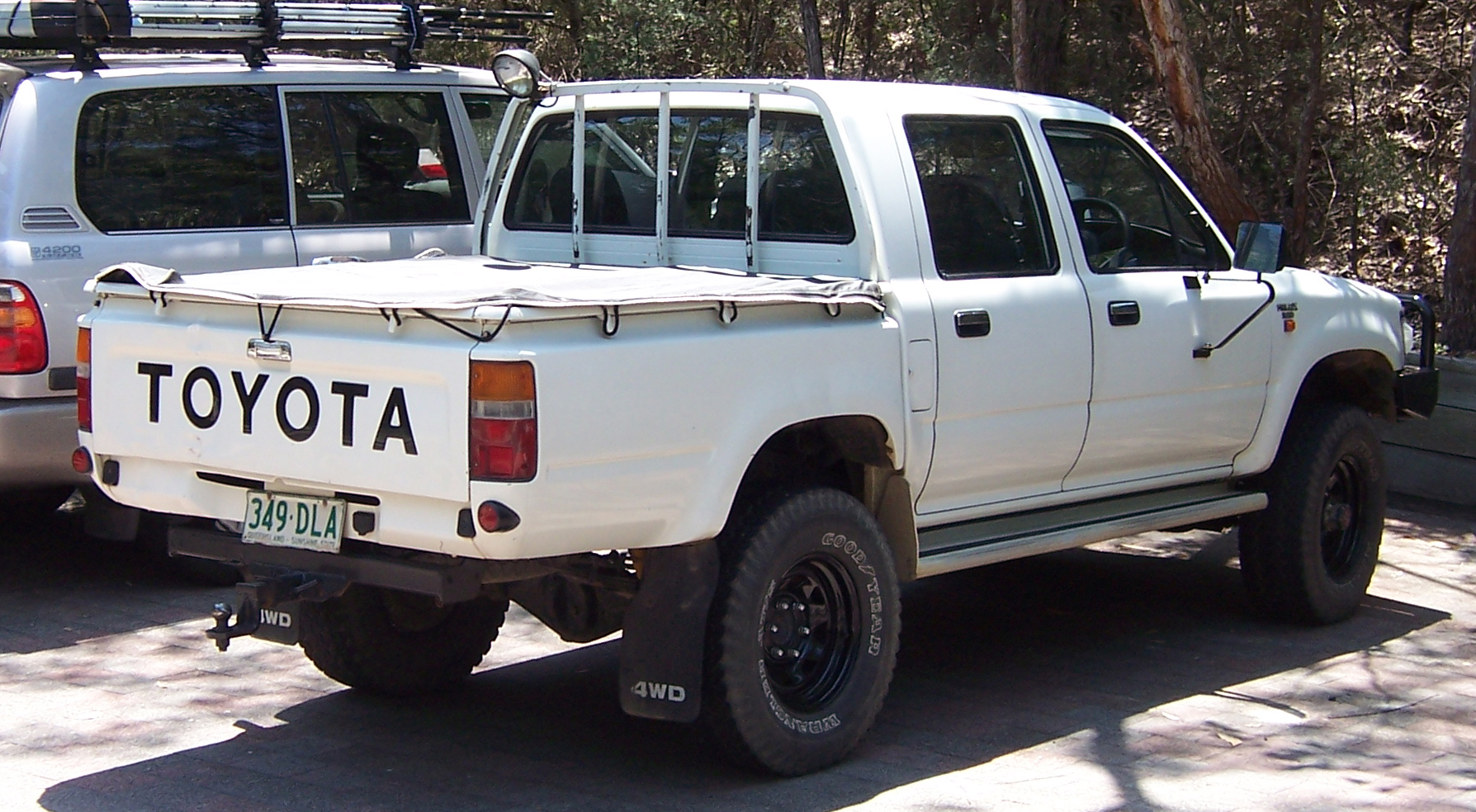
1996 Toyota Hilux

Between 1960 and 1970, Toyota sold a ute variant of the second- and third-generation Corona with an integral bed. It was sold alongside its eventual replacement, the Toyota Hilux, for a couple of years before it was discontinued. Toyota also sold a locally produced CKD ute based on the second- and third-generation Crown (also known as S40 and S50), assembled by Australian Motor Industries.

Toyota currently sells a ute variant of the Toyota Land Cruiser (J70). In 2011, the Toyota Hilux was Australia's highest-selling ute.

== European models ==
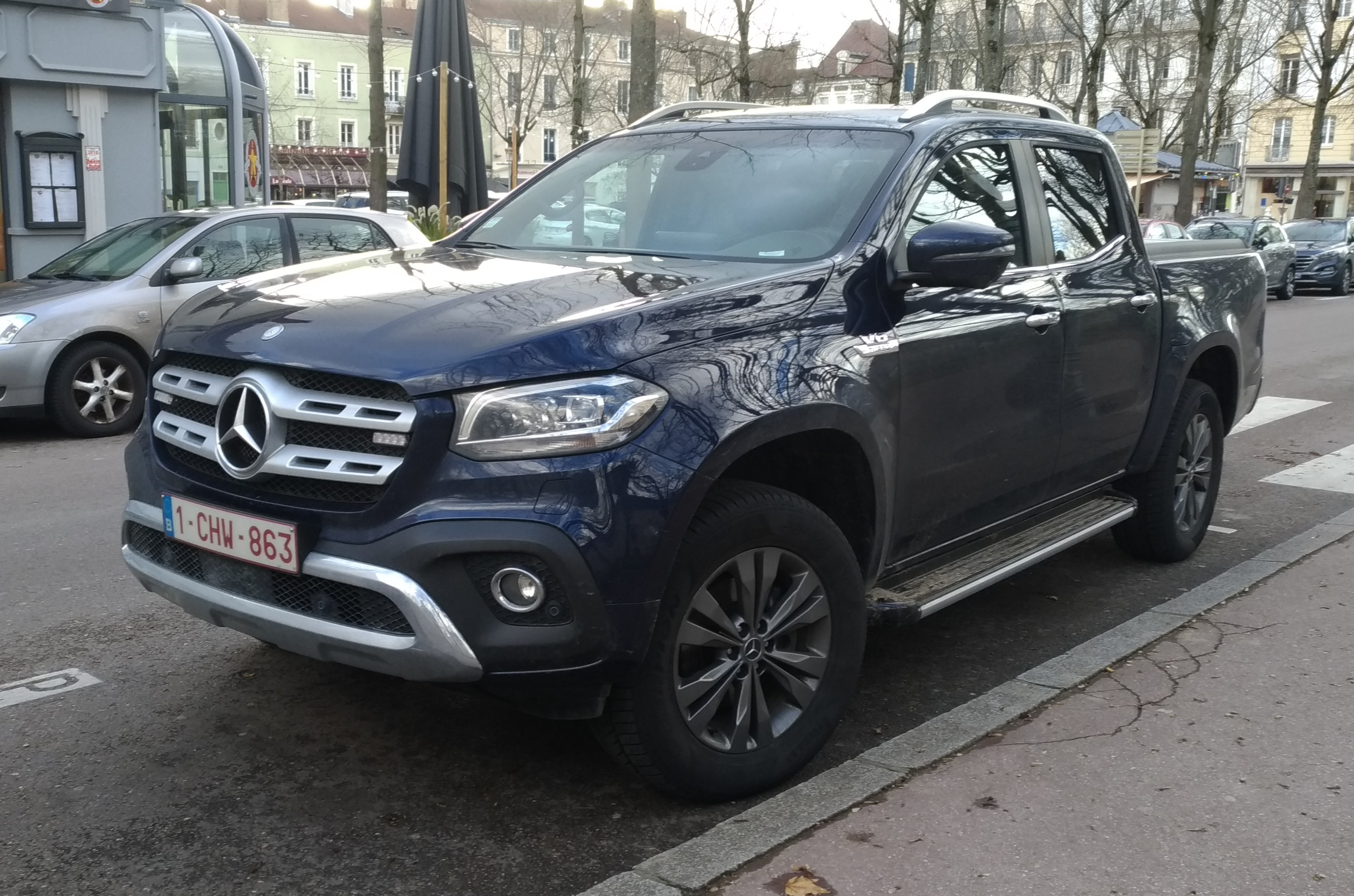
2017-2020 Mercedes X-Class

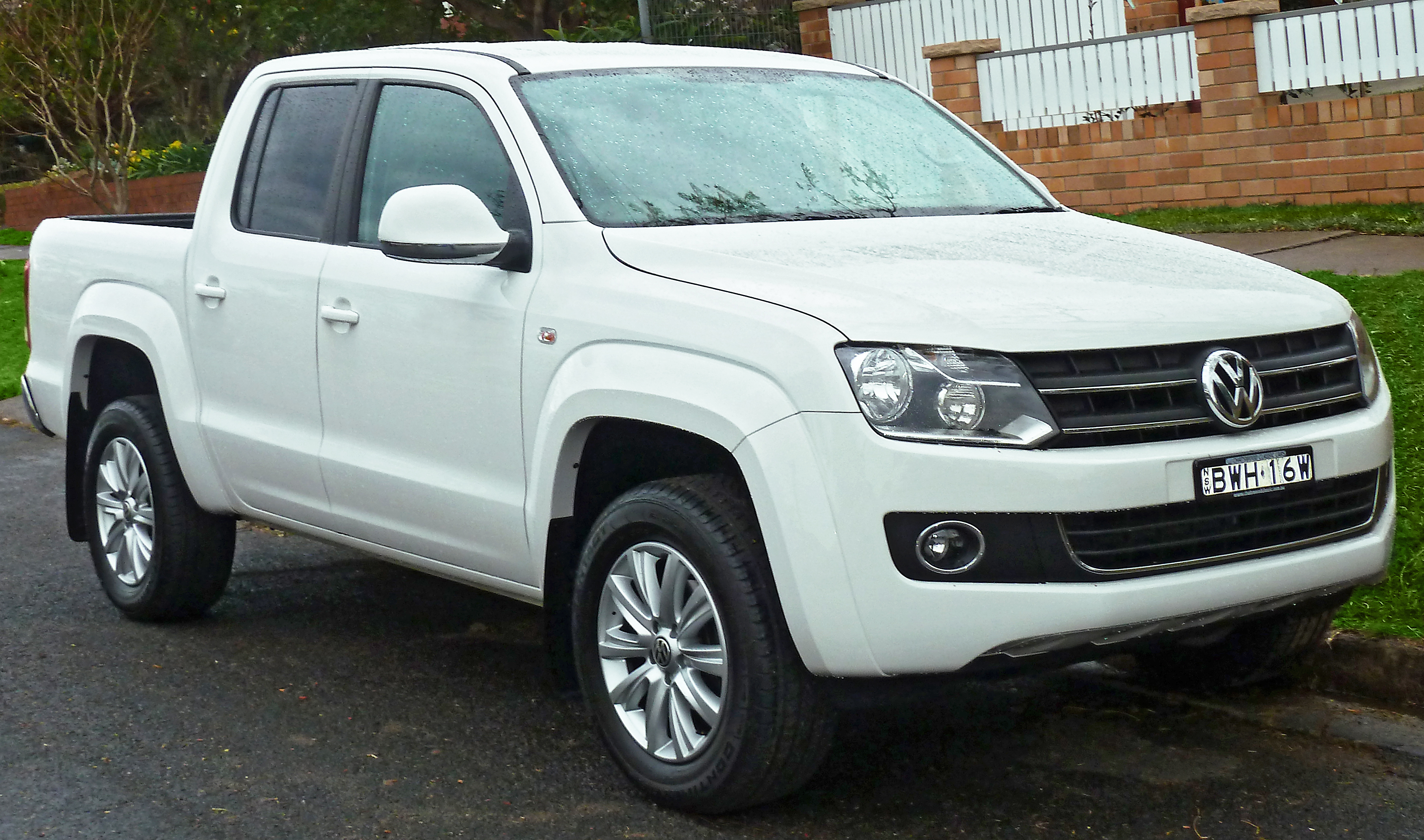
2011 Volkswagen Amarok

=== Mercedes-Benz ===
Between 2017 and 2020, the Mercedes-Benz X-Class was sold in Australia. It used the chassis of the Nissan Navara.

=== Volkswagen ===
Volkswagen has sold the Volkswagen Amarok, a pickup-style ute, since 2010.

From 1979 to 2004, Volkswagen sold the Caddy, a pickup based upon the Volkswagen Golf platform.

== See also ==
- Camper shell
- Car classification
- Flatbed truck
- Kei truck
- Panel van
- Pickup truck
- Roadster Utility
- Coupe Utility
- Self-driving truck
