= Ute muster =

Australian festival

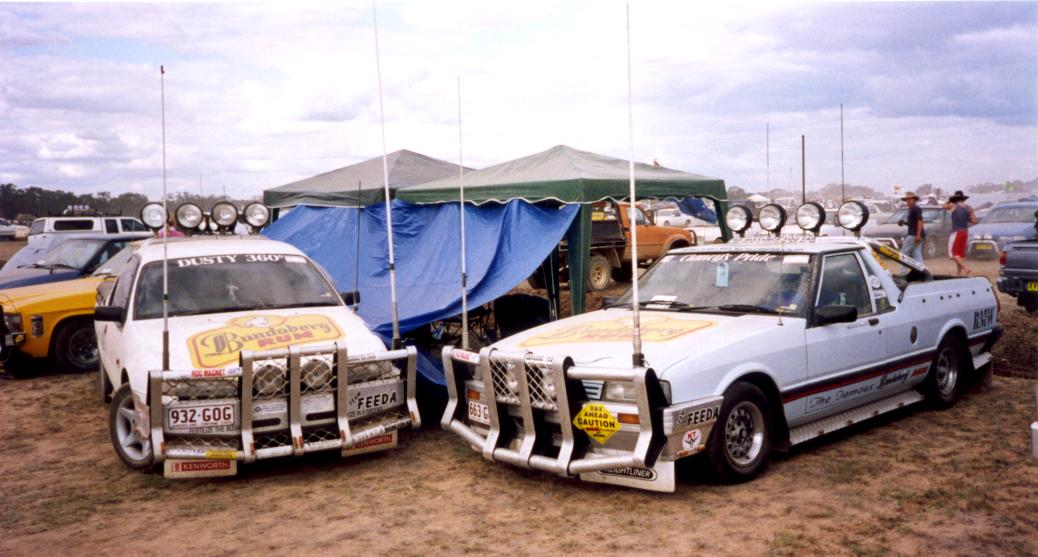
Two utes at the Deniliquin Ute muster, 2002

A ute muster is an Australian festival which brings together large numbers of utes and their owners. These events typically include competitions and other side events, occur annually, and normally last several days and are held in rural areas of Australia and New Zealand.

These events can be seen as a more rural version of the Summernats, a festival which promotes a wider range of car culture.

The Caboolture Urban Country Music Festival, which features a "Beaut Ute" competition, is a country music festival established in 2004.

== Background ==
Often ute musters are combined with a larger festival such as a rodeo, agricultural show or music festival, and are usually sponsored by companies which are local to where the muster is being held.

Ute musters are often viewed as being attended by yobbos who like to drink, but they're also an outlet for enthusiastic ute owners to show off their vehicles which are personalized with lights, stickers, bull bars, and various after-market add-ons. They are generally held to raise money for towns, charities and local causes, and have run in conjunction with agricultural shows or Bachelor and Spinster Balls which raise money for local charities.

The Deniliquin Ute Muster is the largest event of its kind. It is a stand-alone event which began as a celebration of all things Australian and the Australian icon of the ute, and has developed into a two-day festival, with live music concerts, ute driving competitions, the Australian National Circle Work Championships TM, show and shine arena, and bull ride.

Ute enthusiasts tend to have an obsession with bumper stickers, often covering the entire rear window of the ute with them. Accumulating the most different stickers is a sort of status symbol which is often the deciding factor in many of the Beaut Ute competitions (see below). Some of the popular stickers are Bundaberg Rum, Holden, Jim Beam, Ute Muster and the Conargo Pub.

== Beaut ute ==
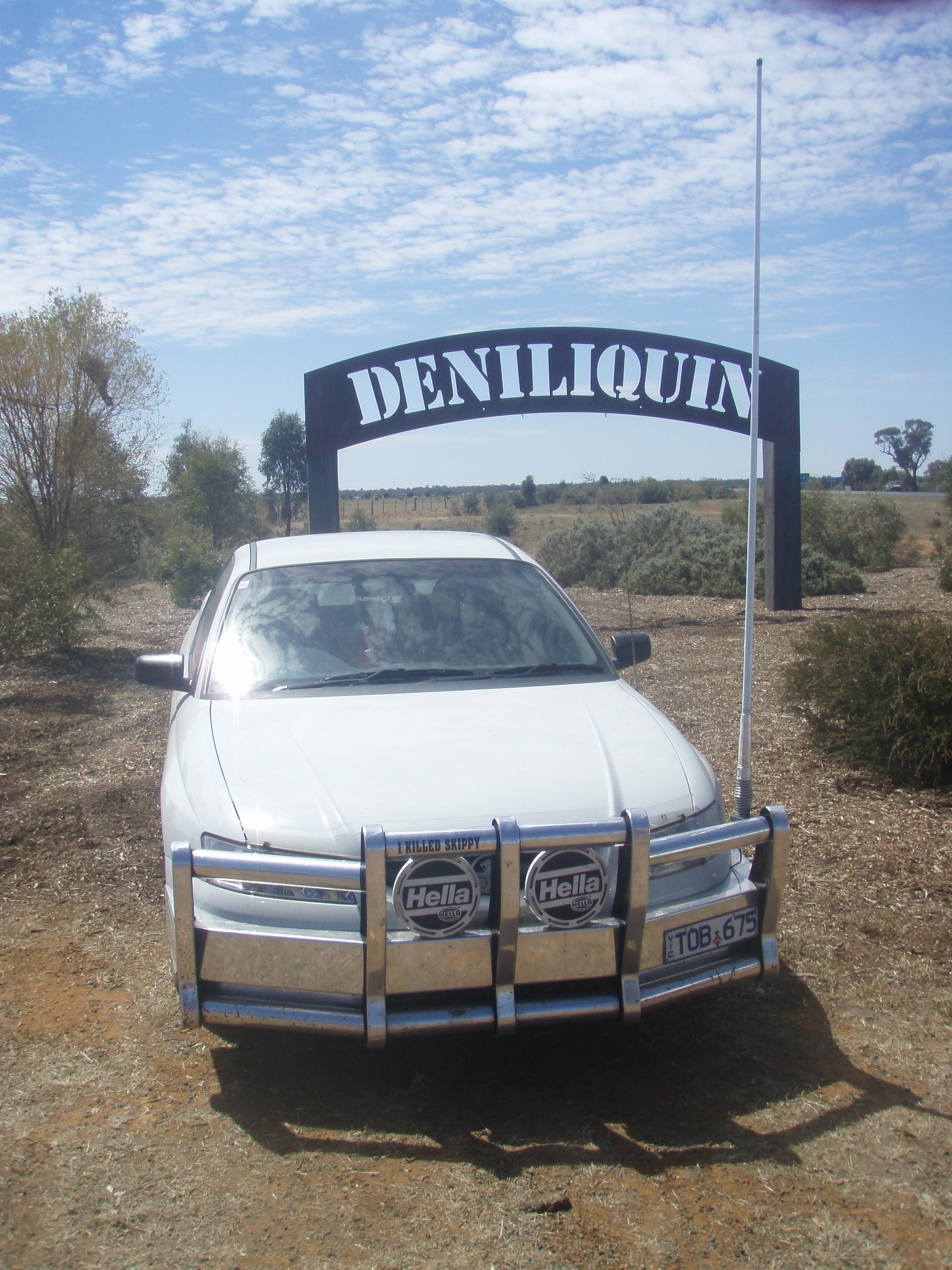
Holden VZ Ute at Deniliquin in 2008.

The event itself involves a congregation of ute enthusiasts who enter their utes in a number of competitions, sometimes referred to as a Beaut Ute Competition. Some of the typical categories are:

- Best Feral Ute – the dirtiest, worst maintained, lived-in Ute
- Best B&S Ute – generally decorated with bullbars, headlights, stickers of alcohol brands or rodeo/ute musters and various pubs
- Best 4WD
- Best Classic Ute – pre-1980 in most original condition.
- Best Chick's Ute – Ute owned and maintained by a woman.
- Best Street Ute – immaculate, gleaming condition.
- Best Trade Ute – Ute decorated with equipment from a particular trade.
- Best Rural Ute – decorated for the rural life.
- Best VB Ute – competition to see how many stubbies fit in the back.
- Best Holden Ute
- Best Ford Ute
- Best Work/Trade Ute

Other categories are also included and run on the day. These are called novelty categories and normally take a side step from the general categories to make a bit of fun to fill in the day. some novelty categories include:

- Best Dog in Ute
- Ute With a Boot
- Furthest Travelled
- Most Kilometers

== Records ==
Most of the ute muster events around Australia try to compete with each other by continually breaking new records of gathering the most vehicles in the one place.

However, that mantle has been claimed by Deniliquin which previously held a small ute show as part of its annual Pastoral and Agricultural Show, but developed the idea into a tourist-attracting event. In 1999 a group of community-minded people got together with the idea of celebrating all things Australian, including the Australian icon of the ute, to attract people to the agricultural town of Deniliquin, located in the southern Riverina region of New South Wales. In its first year, the event held a Guinness Book of Records count of the largest parade of legally registered utes in the world, and each year new records are broken.

In 1999, 2839 drivers took part, establishing Deniliquin as the ute capital of the world. Since that time, the event has grown in popularity and each year breaks its existing world record. As of 2010, Deniliquin's current record stands at 10,152 utes, with over 25,000 attendees in a town that normally has a population of about 8000.

The Deniliquin Ute Muster also holds a record count for the most people wearing blue singlets - in 2010 that Guinness Book of Records count stands at 3500 people.

In 2013, a new ute record of 9,736 was set and a new blue singlet record of 3,924 was counted.

== Distinction from other festivals ==
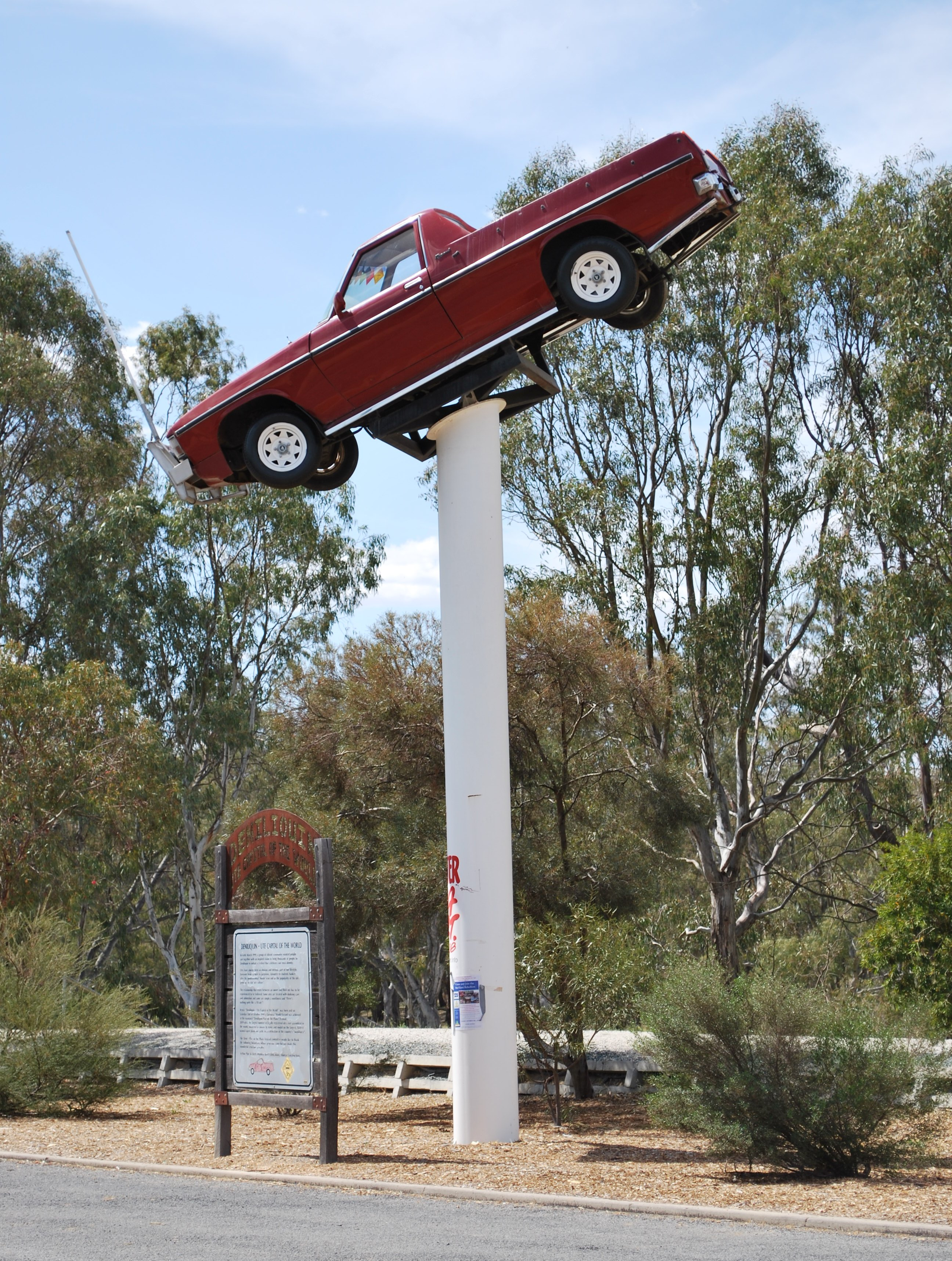
The "Ute on the Pole" at Deniliquin

Ute musters are often held to help raise funds for local charities, such as raising funds for local schools or hospitals. Often the ute musters are associated with local groups such as Apex or Rotary. They are seen as a good drawcard to bring in money from participants who are not members of the local community - so all money spent is extra money for the local community, whether it goes to the local charity, or just to the local economy.

Musters are often held in conjunction with local agricultural shows. This will assists organisers in arranging advertising, insurance and other sponsorship. It can also assist in obtaining the cooperation of local emergency services such as police and ambulance, if the muster is one aspect of a larger, previously established local event.

Most ute musters charge a relatively small fee for participants, allowing them to enter any category they are qualified for. Most participants would enter between five and ten categories, as this keeps the event proceeding. Many participants travel long distances to enter and prefer activities to be held in a short timeframe to allow them to join in other parts of the festival.

Well organised events cater for camping. As this is a usual festival environment drawing participants from large distances in country areas there are limited opportunities for public transport. Both competitors and other participants often make extensive use of any bar facilities; in many events the bar provides a large portion of the funds raised. Well organised events provide for camping as often the most practical accommodation for all concerned.

Whilst larger musters can annoy some locals, this is seen as the exception rather than the rule. Most musters attract between 20 and 100 utes, depending upon event advertising. Commonly, musters also have maximum numbers permitted to attend - this is often a requirement in obtaining event permits.

Event committees need to liaise with local law enforcement. The muster held at Deniliquin is a good example of close relationships with NSW Police. Whilst the organisers recognise that some attendees can flout the law, this is seen as a minority and the event is able to proceed in a realistic environment. This achieves the event's goals of fundraising and ensures participants are able to enjoy the event.

== See also ==
- Bachelor and Spinster Ball
