= Apex Clubs of Australia =

Australian service clubs

Apex Clubs of Australia brand

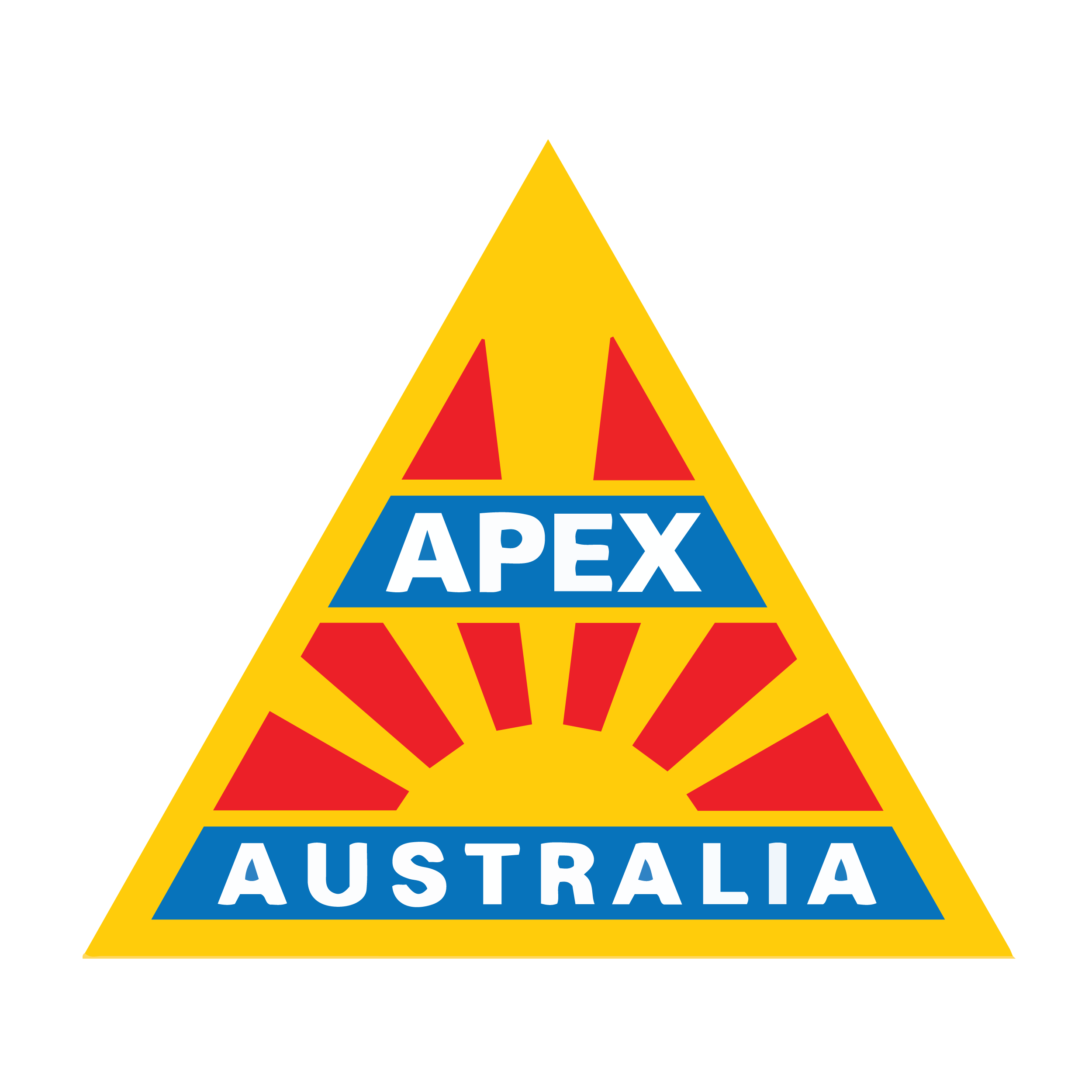
Apex Australia logo

The Association of Apex Clubs of Australia is an Australia-wide association of autonomous clubs dedicated to fellowship, self-improvement, and community service, similar to other service clubs such as Lions International but with a younger membership (18–45). Apex organises a range of activities such as public speaking and debating competitions, ute musters, and Bachelor and Spinster Balls. Members call themselves "Apexians".

== History ==
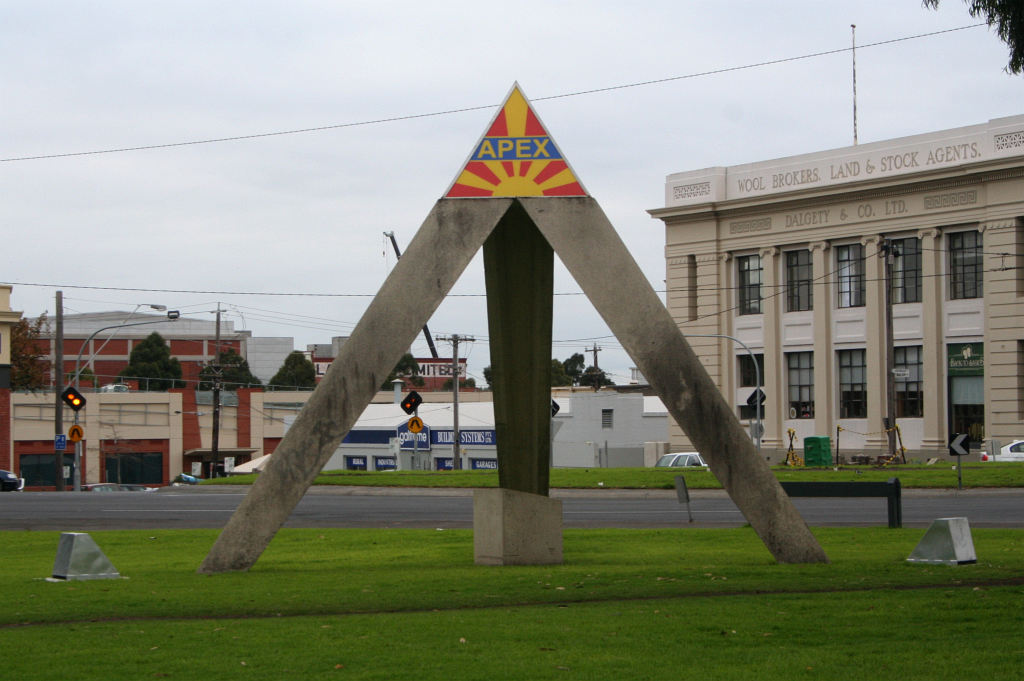
Sculpture located in Johnstone Park, Geelong marking the formation of the association

Apex had its beginnings in Geelong, Victoria in December 1930 with the formation of the "Geelong Young Business Men's Club" by architects Ewen Laird, Langham Proud and John Buchan with the support of the local chapter of Rotary International, the mayor of Geelong, and the Geelong Advertiser. Although Rotary has no formal connection with Apex, it figures in the club's formation, as Buchan's father was a Rotarian, and the three friends might have joined but for that organisation's rule of no two members in the same profession.

This was the time of the Great Depression in Australia, when there was a great need for service-oriented men to work together, and the club soon had 60 members. On 10 March 1931 they adopted the name "Apex" with the triangular badge symbolizing the club's three ideals: service, citizenship and fellowship. That day has since been recognised as the birth of the organisation. Within a few months a club was formed in Ballarat, with assistance from Rotary. Bendigo followed, then Camperdown, Albury, Warrnambool, Wagga, Launceston and Orange. By the start of the Second World War there were 41 clubs scattered across Australia, from Perth to Brisbane.

Each year conventions were held, both at region level and association-wide, where apart from socializing and attendance at workshops and speeches, decisions affecting all clubs were voted on. In 1958 a move was made to found Apex clubs overseas, and to that end the word "National" was dropped from the associations, "National President" became "President of the Association", and "National Council" became "Executive Council".

Projects and causes adopted by the Association include: (Note: Contemporary terminology. Some usages are now deprecated.)

- Seat belts in passenger vehicles
- "Learn to Swim" campaign
- "Operation Apex Sea Lift" encouraging each club to sponsor a British family as migrants
- Full citizenship to Aboriginal people
- Mouth-to-mouth resuscitation
- Aid to the mentally retarded
- Miss Apex Australia quest
- Guide Dogs for the Blind
- Improved pensions for civilian widows
- Improved pensions for families of jail inmates
- Recruiting blood donors
- Daylight saving
- Guthrie test for phenylketonuria (1969)
- Aid to the Disabled (1970)
- Autistic children
- Well-sinking in India
- Banning cigarette advertising (1972)
- Foundation 41 neonatal research (1974)
- Multiple sclerosis research
- Children's Leukemia and Cancer Foundation
- Drug awareness (1978)
- Sudden infant death syndrome (Note: "Sudden Instant Death Syndrome" typo in the reference, p.33)
- Ban on TV liquor advertising
- Apex Australia Fine Arts Scholarship

Proposals that were lost to the vote include fluoridation of water and decimalization of currency.

== Club achievements ==
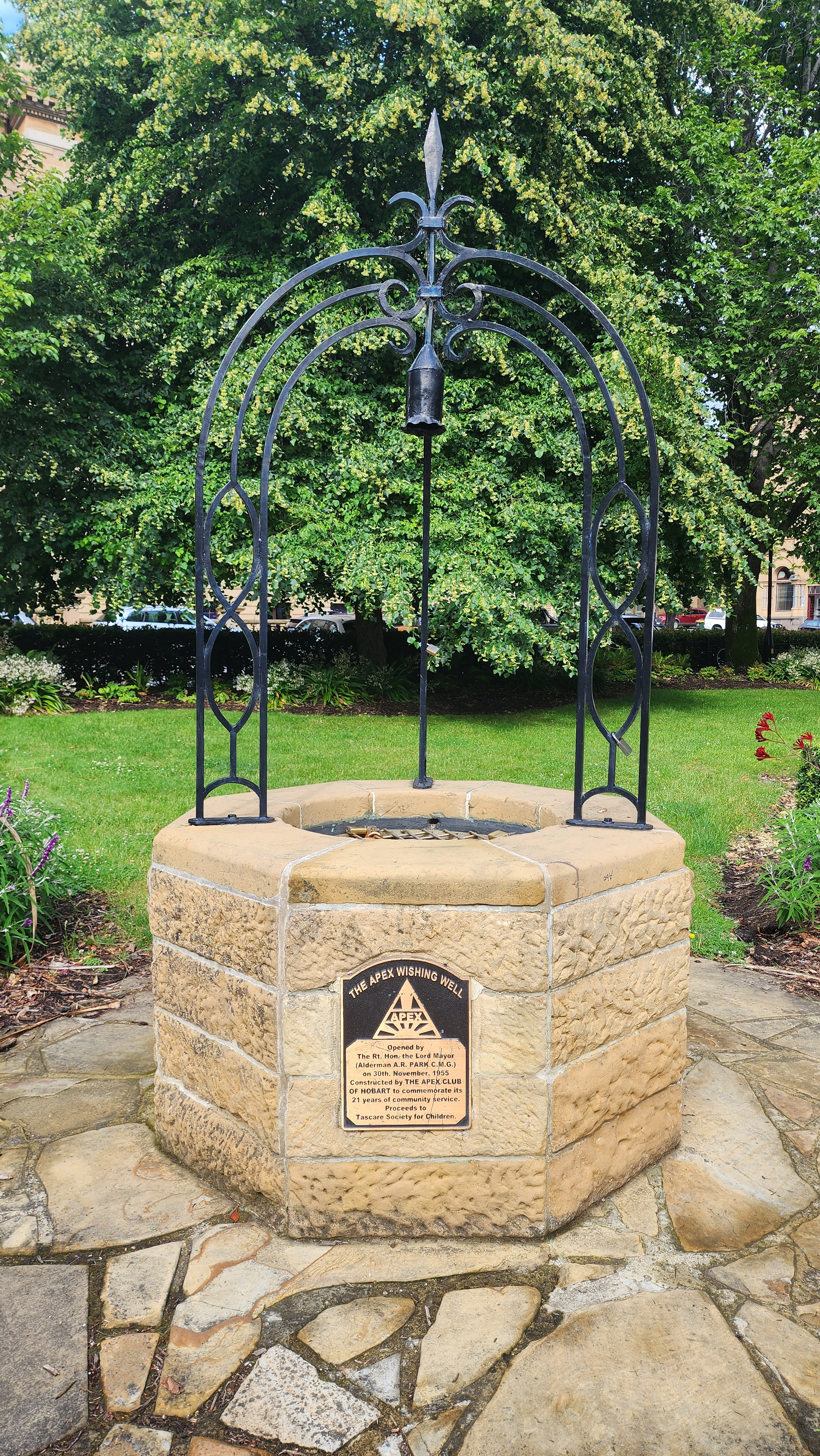
The Apex Wishing Well at Franklin Square (Hobart)

A range of works were undertaken at a local level. Some clubs took on projects that were more ambitious:

- 1950: Claremont club helped establish a guide dog training center at Belmont, transferred to Kew, Victoria in 1957.
- 1956: Launceston club built a bowling green for a home for the aged.
- 1959: Coolangatta-Tweed Heads club built a 50-by-24-foot (15.2 m × 7.3 m) brick-veneer holiday home for children with cerebral palsy in one day of ten working hours, fully lined and finished, with well-equipped kitchen, fully wired, plumbed and connected. Around 100 local tradesmen volunteered their services.
- 1965: Mount Barker, South Australia, club restored a century-old derelict windmill to working order
- 1967: Broken Hill club raised $250,000 to build a 16,000-square-foot (1,500 m^{2}) geriatric wing for the town's Home of Compassion.
- 1968: Yass club, with assistance from Rotary and Legacy, built the "Yass Apex Homes", ten flats for aged citizens on land bequeathed to the cause.
- 1976: Tennant Creek club produced the Tennant Times, the town's only newspaper.

== Growth and decline ==
There were 100 chartered Apex clubs in 1954, 162 in 1956, 200 in 1958. In 1964 there were 410 clubs and 11,000 Apexians, with 70% of membership in the country; in 1970 there were 615 clubs and almost 16,000 members. In 1976 membership had reached 17,400 in 796 clubs.

By 1970 there was a small number of Apex clubs in Papua and New Guinea, Singapore, Malaysia, Ceylon, India, East and West Pakistan, Nauru, Fiji and The Philippines.

Initially Apex membership was restricted to males 18 to 35 years of age, with mandatory retirement at age 40. Beginning in the early 1990s individual clubs could declare themselves "all male", "all female", or "mixed", with the upper age for women set at 45, but since the 2006 National Convention there has been no gender requirement for membership.

Geelong's last Apex club (Barwon) folded in 2015, but there were still 150 active clubs elsewhere in Australia.

== Notable members ==
- Miles Bourke (1925–1982), farmer and founding president (1979) of the Victorian Farmers and Graziers Association (became Victorian Farmers' Federation), was a member of the Warracknabeal Apex Club.
- Sir John Buchan, businessman and Apex co-founder, president of the Australia-America Association and councillor of the City of Melbourne.
- Herb Elliott sen., father of athlete Herb Elliott, was president of Perth club and appointed Life Governor in 1953.
- Sir Harold Roy Fidge (1904–1981), solicitor and mayor of Geelong, a founder of the Geelong Apex Club in 1932 and was secretary-treasurer of the Apex national council 1935–40, 1946–1947, and in 1940 elected a life governor.
- Donald Bruce Mackay (1933–1977), furniture store proprietor and murdered anti-drugs campaigner, was at various times secretary and president of the Griffith Apex Club and district governor.
- Ivor Gray Morris (1911–1995), woollens manufacturer, was a founder in 1938 of the Ipswich Apex Club and president in 1941, district governor in 1945.
- William Phelan (1915–1973), businessman and politician, founding member (1939) of Maryborough, Victoria, Apex club and president 1944–46.
- William Langham Proud CBE (28 January 1909 – December 1984), architect, born at Korumburra, Victoria, was co-founder of Geelong Apex Club.
- John Basil Regan (1903–1987), flour-miller, was foundation member (1935) of the Tamworth Apex Club.
- Bevan Rutt OBE was president of the Adelaide Apex club in 1948, became charter president of Adelaide Lions Club in 1961 and later a District Governor. In 1964 he gave up his practice as architect to work full-time for Guide Dogs for the Blind. He became president of the National Guide Dogs Association in 1966.
- William R. Tresise MBE (1907–1975) was a member 1936–1947 and president 1945–1947. He then founded Australia's first Lions Club in Lismore on 29 September 1947, was first (Australian Lions) District Governor.
- William John Wallwork (1903–1971), magistrate, was founding president (1936/37) of the Bunbury Apex club.

=== National Presidents ===
| Year | Name | Club | Notes |
|---|---|---|---|
| 1932 | Eric Hooper | Geelong | |
| 1933 | Will Belscher | Bendigo | |
| 1934 | Stan Jackling | Albury | |
| 1935 | John Buchan | Geelong | part year only |
| 1935 | Colin George | Camperdown | |
| 1936 | Alan E. Edwards | Wagga | |
| 1938 | Basil Jones | Hobart | |
| 1939 | John Sykes | Wollongong | |
| 1941 | Stan Johnson | Sydney | |
| 1943 | Tom Bellair | Melbourne | |
| 1945 | Bill Tresise | Lismore | see bio (above) |
| 1947 | Tom Maguire | Wollongong | |
| 1949 | Langdon Parsons | Glenelg | |
| 1951 | Alan Rowland | Glen Innes | |
| 1953 | Ernest White | Orange | |
| 1955 | Gordon Murray | Geelong | |
| 1957 | Arthur Holden | Morwell | |
| 1959 | Ralph Bower | Perth | |
| 1961 | Graham Grose | Mordialloc | |
| 1963 | Doug Cameron | Manly | |
| 1964 | Kevin Tuckey | Parkes | |
| 1965 | Gilbert F. "Tig" Thomas | Narrandera | |
| 1966 | Bruce Clarke | Quirindi | |
| 1967 | David Richards | Terang | |
| 1968 | George Sprague | Campsie | |
| 1969 | Peter Mayo | Perth | |
| 1970 | Carl Bisson | Byron Bay | |
| 1971 | Brian Horgan | Croydon | |
| 1972 | Tony Randall | Lane Cove | |
| 1973 | Brian Matthews | Launceston | |
| 1974 | Don Ferguson | Killara | |
| 1975 | John Cleaves | Cessnock | |
| 1976 | Tom Chapman | Adelaide | |
| 1977 | Graham Salter | Carringbah | |
| 1978 | Graham Sampson | Springwood | |
| 1979 | Ian Main | Launceston | |
| 1980 | Ian Wolfgang | Denman | |
| 1981 | Peter Baulch | Doncaster | |
| 1982 | Peter Walsh | Woy Woy | |
| 1983 | Bob Gilliver | Toowong/Kenmore | |
| 1984 | Terry Anderson | Tea Tree Gully | |
| 1985 | Stephen Smith | Wendouree | |
| 1986 | John Phillips | West Beach | |
| 1987 | Brian Gill | Springwood | |
| 1988 | Alan Musgrave | Forbes | |
| 1989 | lain Evans | Stirling | |
| 1990 | Jim Hughes | Hobart | |
| 1990 | Loraine Janssen | North Adelaide | |
| 1991 | Angus Redford | Adelaide | |
| 1991 | Diane English | Brisbane South West | |
| 1992 | Christina Boothby | North Darwin | |
| 1993 | Mark Ballin | Ipswich | |
| 1993 | Liz Keddie | Adelaide Metro | |
| 1994 | Wayne Hosier | Maroubra | |
| 1994 | Barbara Simpson/Chris McGurgan | Forest Area | |
| 1995 | Shane Kelly | Wallaroo | |
| 1996 | Gil Thomas | Latrobe | |
| 1996 | Carolyn Dare | Townsville Womens | |
| 1997 | Eric Accornero | Herbert River | |
| 1997 | Kath Venters | Geelong Womens | |
| 1998 | Mike Neville | Griffith | |
| 1999 | Mark Fishwick | Emu Bay | |
| 2000 | Stephen Gribbin | Tamworth | |
| 2001 | David Parsons | Mansfield | |
| 2002 | Ollie Dowd | Wee Waa/Narrabri | |
| 2003 | Bryan Whitehorn | Glenelg | |
| 2004 | Stuart Hughes | Hoppers Crossing | |
| 2005 | Bruce Kelman | Esperance | |
| 2006 | Phil Pregnell | Kingston | |
| 2007 | Rick Hose | Maryborough | |
| 2008 | Paul Gallagher | Leeton | |
| 2009 | Mark Wenzel | Mount Barker | |
| 2010 | Jeff Hardie | Sarina | |
| 2011 | Chris Morahan | Brisbane City | |
| 2012 | Chris Morahan | Brisbane City | |
| 2013 | Kate Huth | Albany | |
| 2014 | Nedd Golding | Clare | |
| 2015 | Jim McNall | Maryborough | |
| 2016 | Mathew O'Donnell | Hoppers Crossing | |
| 2017 | Robert Abraham | Chinchilla | |
| 2018 | Neal Molineaux | Wagga Wagga | |
| 2019 | Michael Godfrey | Wongan Hills | |
| 2020 | Bethany Paterson | Kadina | |
| 2021 | Adam Stewart | Toowoomba | |
| 2022 | Simon Grant | Beaufort | |
| 2023 | Ben Curnow | Beaufort | |
| 2024 | Ben Curnow | Beaufort | |
| 2025 | Tara Spotswood | Bundaberg | |
| 2026 | Gavin Mingay | Toowoomba | |

=== Life Governors ===
"Life Governor" is the highest award Apex can award its members.

| Year | Name | Club | Notes |
|---|---|---|---|
| 1936 | Eric Hooper | Geelong | |
| 1940 | Sir Roy Fidge | Geelong | see bio (above) |
| 1942 | Sir John Buchan | Geelong | |
| 1942 | Ewen Laird | Geelong | |
| 1942 | W. Langham Proud CBE | Geelong | |
| 1945 | Colin Campbell | Bunbury | |
| 1945 | Stan Johnson | Sydney | |
| 1945 | Tom Bellair | Melbourne | |
| 1945 | Roy Birdsey | Geelong | |
| 1947 | Bill Tresise | Lismore | see bio (above) |
| 1947 | Stan Jackling | Albury | |
| 1947 | John Sykes | Wollongong | |
| 1950 | Tom Maguire | Wollongong | |
| 1951 | John Nortey | Inverell | |
| 1952 | Langdon Parsons | Glenelg | |
| 1953 | Herb Elliott (sen.) | Perth | |
| 1954 | Allan Rowland | Glen Innes | |
| 1954 | Jack Squires | Perth | |
| 1957 | Gordon Murray | Geelong | |
| 1959 | Pete Garnsey | Albury | |
| 1960 | Arthur Holden | Morwell | |
| 1961 | Tony Miller | Hamilton, Vic. | |
| 1964 | Len Bosman | Hurstville | |
| 1965 | Ralph Bower | Perth | |
| 1966 | G. F. "Tig" Thomas | Killara | |
| 1969 | Bruce Clarke | Parramatta | |
| 1971 | George Sprague | Campsie | |
| 1972 | David Richards | Terang | |
| 1973 | Dick Clampett | Blackwood | |
| 1974 | Brian Horgan | Croydon (Croydon, Victoria ?) | |
| 1976 | Carl Bisson | Byron Bay | |
| 1978 | Don Ferguuson | Killara | |
| 1979 | John Cleaves | Cessnock | |
| 1980 | Graham Salter | Carringbah | |
| 1981 | Tom Chapman | Adelaide | |
| 1982 | Bill Belscher | Bendigo | |
| 1983 | Ken Slatter | Boort, Victoria | |
| 1983 | Ross McLeod | Lane Cove | |
| 1984 | John Russell | Barmera | |
| 1988 | Peter Walsh | Woy Woy | |
| 1989 | Terry Anderson | Tea Tree Gully | |
| 1990 | Stephen Smith | Wendouree | |
| 1991 | John Stokes | Claremont | |
| 1993 | Jim Hughes | Jindalee | |
| 1994 | John Phillips | West Beach | |
| 1995 | Ray Vincent | Berry (Berri, South Australia ?) | |
| 1998 | Andrew Philips | Adelaide | |
| 2005 | Shane Kelly | Wallaroo | |
| 2019 | Neil Sawley | Kadina | |
| 2022 | Mark Ballin | Brisbane Valley | |
