= Bachelor and Spinster Ball =

Social events in rural Australia

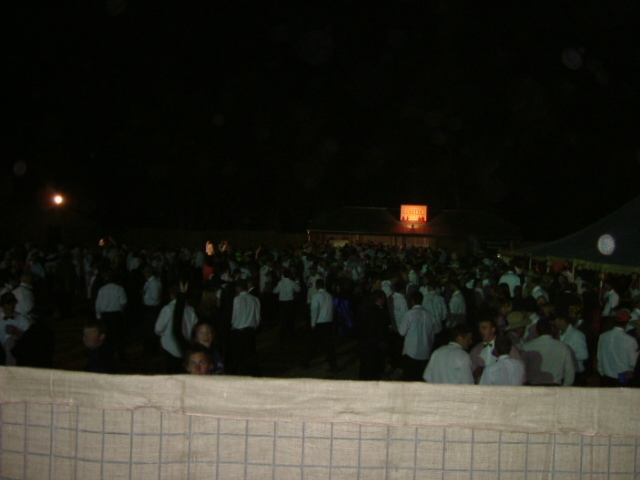
Bar area of Ariah Park B&S 2006

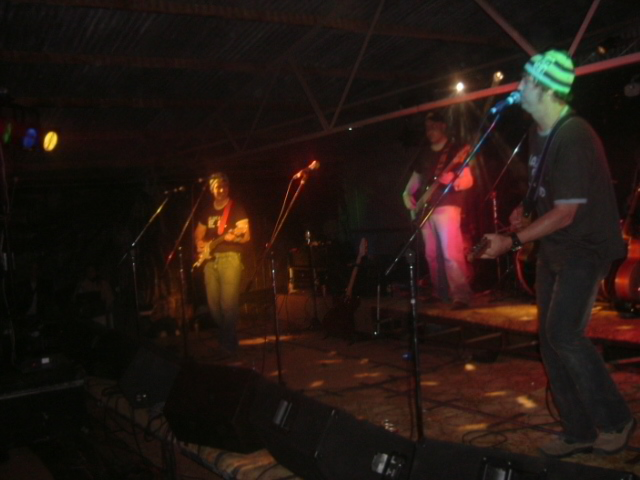
Typical stage area

Bachelor and Spinsters Ball or Bloke's & Sheila's Ball events, known locally as B & S Balls or simply B&Ss, are hosted regularly in rural Australia.

They are staged for young (18 years and over) spinsters and bachelors and traditionally the couples dress up in formal wear. Large volumes of cheap alcohol such as beer, spirits, Bundaberg Rum and Jim Beam can be consumed. The activities usually start at night and run until morning, but from mid-afternoon people will start to arrive and the partying/drinking will begin. Country music is often featured at these events.

Historically the event was centred on country people trying to find a partner, but in modern times the focus has shifted to having a good time and meeting up with new and old friends, some of whom can live many hours away. This has changed the atmosphere of the events to such a degree that the dress code is relaxed and many do not wear formal gear, preferring to dress in clothes from opportunity shops. Even when they are wearing formal attire, today most of the men (and some of the women) sport Akubras, boots and R. M. Williams gear. Some people go in fancy dress, for example, school girls, nurses, clowns or lawn bowlers.

It is not unusual for the modern B&Ss to be run by ute enthusiasts following minor ute musters. Ute drivers at the B&S Balls sometimes perform stunts, such as driving their utes at dusk and throw flames from the exhausts and do doughnuts. Doughnuts, usually banned, are where the utes are driven in tighter and tighter circles. Food dye is a regular sight at a B&S and is normally thrown on people (even when it is banned). A person who is attending for the first time is often marked with the word "Virgin".

After the event people usually sleep in their swag on the back of their ute. Usually the committee supplies something for dinner and breakfast the next day. Some committees run a "recovery" where the ball goers move to a different location to continue drinking, having fun and sometimes participating in competitions.

Tickets can cost anything from AU$80 to AU$110 and usually include all you can drink, dinner and sometimes breakfast as well as little gifts such as ear tags, hats, stickers and sometimes condoms and lubricant. People will travel many kilometres to attend the balls, and the profits made from them go to charities and organizations such as the Royal Flying Doctor Service, Red Cross and the Australian Cancer Council, as well as local charities of the specific area.

In 2009 as part of the Q150 celebrations, the Bachelor and Spinster Balls were announced as one of the Q150 Icons of Queensland for its role as an "event and festival".
