= Electric drag racing =

Form of motor racing

Electric drag racing is a form of drag motor racing between electric vehicles.

The rules are very different from traditional drag racing. The common safety rules apply but additional rules apply depending on voltage, battery type, motor number and configuration. The National Electric Drag Racing Association (NEDRA) oversees the majority of electric drag racing events in North America.

Electric motors produce 100% torque at zero RPM and this makes them quicker off the line compared to a piston-engined vehicle of the same power. Since battery technology has improved a great deal during the 1980s to present, the performance gap between piston-engined & electric-motor vehicles has narrowed. The weight of the battery packs can impact overall performance raising 1/4 mile times.

== World records ==
=== Motorcycles, 1/8 mile ===
In the drag motorcycle class, 48 volt NEDRA division, current world record is 7.800 seconds over 1/8 mile, set on 16 June 2010 by Silver Giant II at Mosten, Denmark. Finish line speed was 80.20 mph (129 km/h). The lithium-ion polymer battery provides 48 volts and 600 amperes to each of four 24 volt motors for a combined power of around 100kW, although less than half that power reaches the rear wheel, because a large part is lost as heat in the motors. Dry ice is used to cool the motors to 5 °C between races. It has two gears, and the shift occurs automatically at 65 km/h (40 mph) using CO_{2}-pneumatics. It is built and raced by Danish Team True Cousins, who holds the record for the 24 volt division at 8.677 seconds.

=== Motorcycles, 1/4 mile ===
The current quickest electric vehicle in the world as of December 2017 is the "Rocket Bike", a motorcycle owned by Shawn Lawless and piloted by Larry "Spiderman" McBride, with a time of 6.940 seconds ET in the quarter mile at 201.37 MPH set at Virginia Motorsports Park in May 2012. Besides being the first rider to break 200 MPH in the quarter mile, Mr. McBride was also the first to break into the 6 seconds bracket with an electric vehicle. Larry "Spiderman" McBride is also the first to break into the 5 second bracket on a fuel powered motorcycle. This bike currently holds the NEDRA World Record in class DC3/MC in the National Electric Drag Racing Association.

The Battery pack was designed and built by Derek Barger and Rae Ciciora at High Tech Systems LLC in Colorado. Original Battery Management System BMS was designed by Steve Ciciora and Derek Barger. The Motorcycle was assembled at Orange County Choppers for the TV show.

=== Dragsters, 1/4 mile ===
The first pass by an electric dragster to break 200 mph was made by Steve Huff. The dragster known as Current Technogy recorded an elapsed time of 7.52 seconds and a top speed of 201.07 mph at Tucson Dragway on May 14, 2020.https://www.stevehuffmotorsports.com/e-spec-racecars

The fastest drag run by an electric vehicle was set by the Ford Mustang Cobra Jet 2200 at the 2026 NHRA 4-Wide Nationals, setting a maximum trap speed of 222.36 mph (357.5 kph), and an elapsed time of 6.766 seconds (separate runs).

=== Cars, 1/4 mile ===
2018 The TC-X electric door slammer made a perfect run at 7.98 seconds at the dragstrip at Mantorp Park in Sweden piloted by Glenn Nielsen, and since the previous run was 7.99, this confirmed the new world record. Top speed was 274 km/h (170 mph). After that run, True Cousins can now claim the current fastest times for electric car at both 1/4 mile and 1/8 mile.

The current quickest electric doorslammer car (that is with regular doors, in contrast with funny cars) is the Black Current III, owned by Sam and Olly Young of England. It currently holds the NEDRA World Record in the XS/A2 class at 9.64 seconds ET at 133.21 MPH. The record was set at Santa Pod Raceway in Northamptonshire, England on July 23, 2011.

The current quickest electric (door slammer) pick up, "Lemon Juice" is owned and driven by Shawn Lawless of Ohio. It currently holds the NEDRA World Record in the MC/A2 class at 9.957 seconds ET at 127.38 MPH.

== Organizations ==
- National Electric Drag Racing Association (NEDRA)

== See also ==
- Drag racing
- Electric dragbike
- Electric dragster
- Jet dragster
- Rocket dragster
- Electric motorsport
