= Drag racing =

Type of motor racing

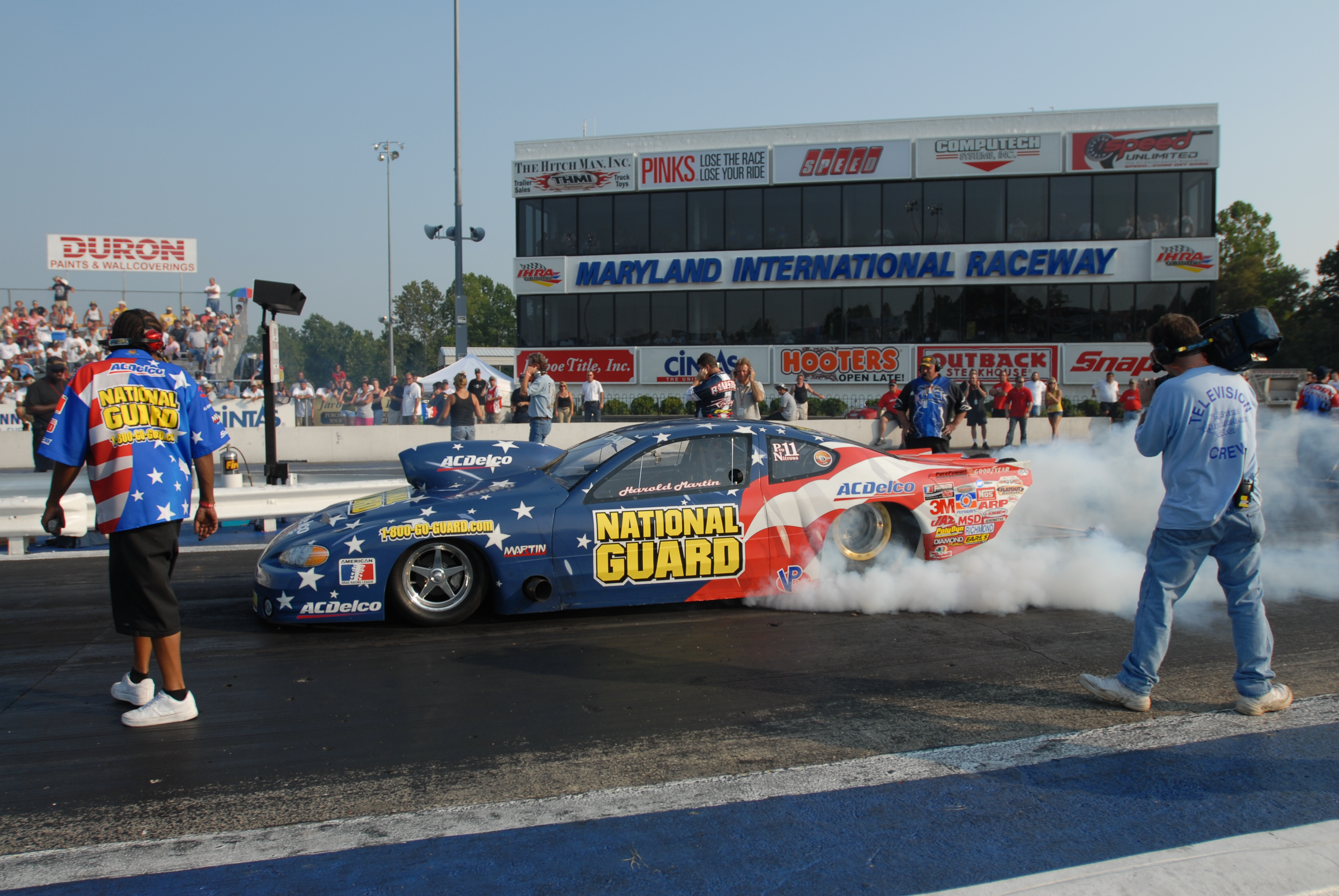
American Drag Racing League's (ADRL) drag racing event held on July 28, 2008, at the Maryland International Raceway

Drag racing is a type of motor racing in which automobiles or motorcycles compete, usually two at a time, to be first to cross a set finish line. The race follows a short, straight course from a standing start over a measured distance, most commonly 1/4 mi (1,320 ft; 402 m), with a shorter, 1,000 ft (0.19 mi; 304.80 m) distance becoming increasingly popular, as it has become the standard for Top Fuel dragsters and Funny Cars, where some major bracket races and other sanctioning bodies have adopted it as the standard. The 1/8 mi (660 ft; 201 m) is also popular in some circles. Electronic timing and speed sensing systems have been used to record race results since the 1960s.

The history of automobiles and motorcycles being used for drag racing is nearly as long as the history of motorized vehicles themselves, and has taken the form of both illegal street racing and as a regulated motorsport.

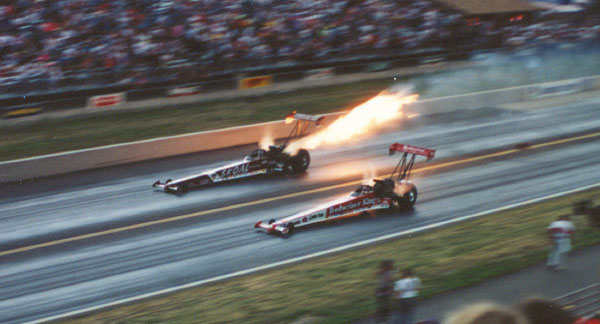
Top Fuel drag race between Don Prudhomme and Kenny Bernstein in 1991 in which Prudhomme's dragster caught fire

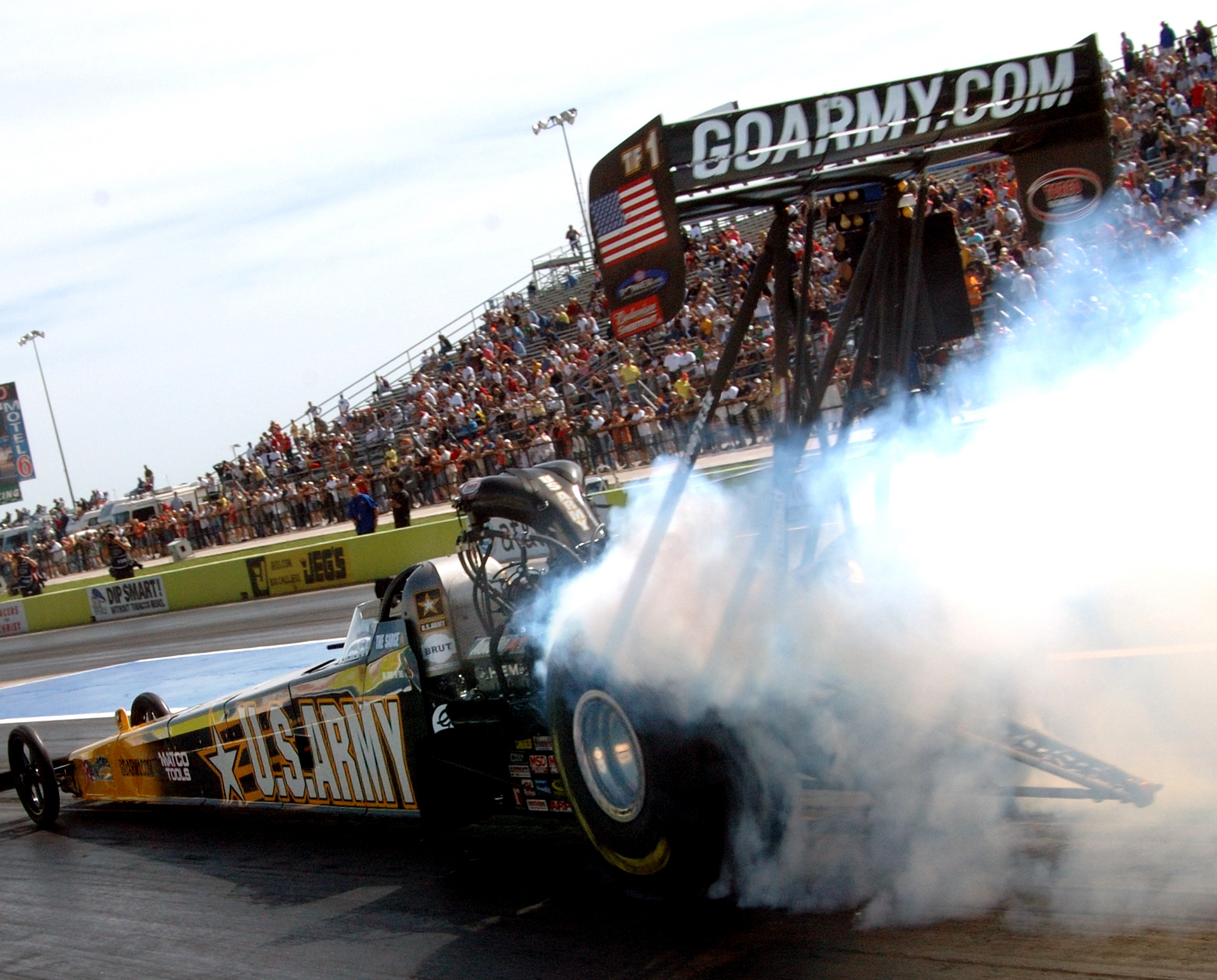
Drag racing is a sport in which vehicles compete to see which can travel a specific distance the fastest from a standing start. To achieve high acceleration, drag racers have large tires, and the tires often "burn rubber" by friction with the pavement before the start, in order to heat and soften the tread surface of the tires. Tony Schumacher in 2006 race.

== History ==
Drag racing started in the 1940s. World War II veterans were prominently involved, and some early drag races were done at decommissioned aircraft bases with landing strips that made them an ideal place for the sport. In 1951, Wally Parks formed the National Hot Rod Association (NHRA). The organization banned the use of nitromethane in 1957, calling it unsafe, in part through the efforts of C. J. Hart; the ban would be lifted in 1963.

Several other racing organizations were created over the past several decades, such as the Professional Drag Racers Association (PDRA) founded in 2014.

Thanks in part to the Discovery series Street Outlaws, fandom for drag racing has seen a resurgence in the past decade.

== Basics of drag racing ==
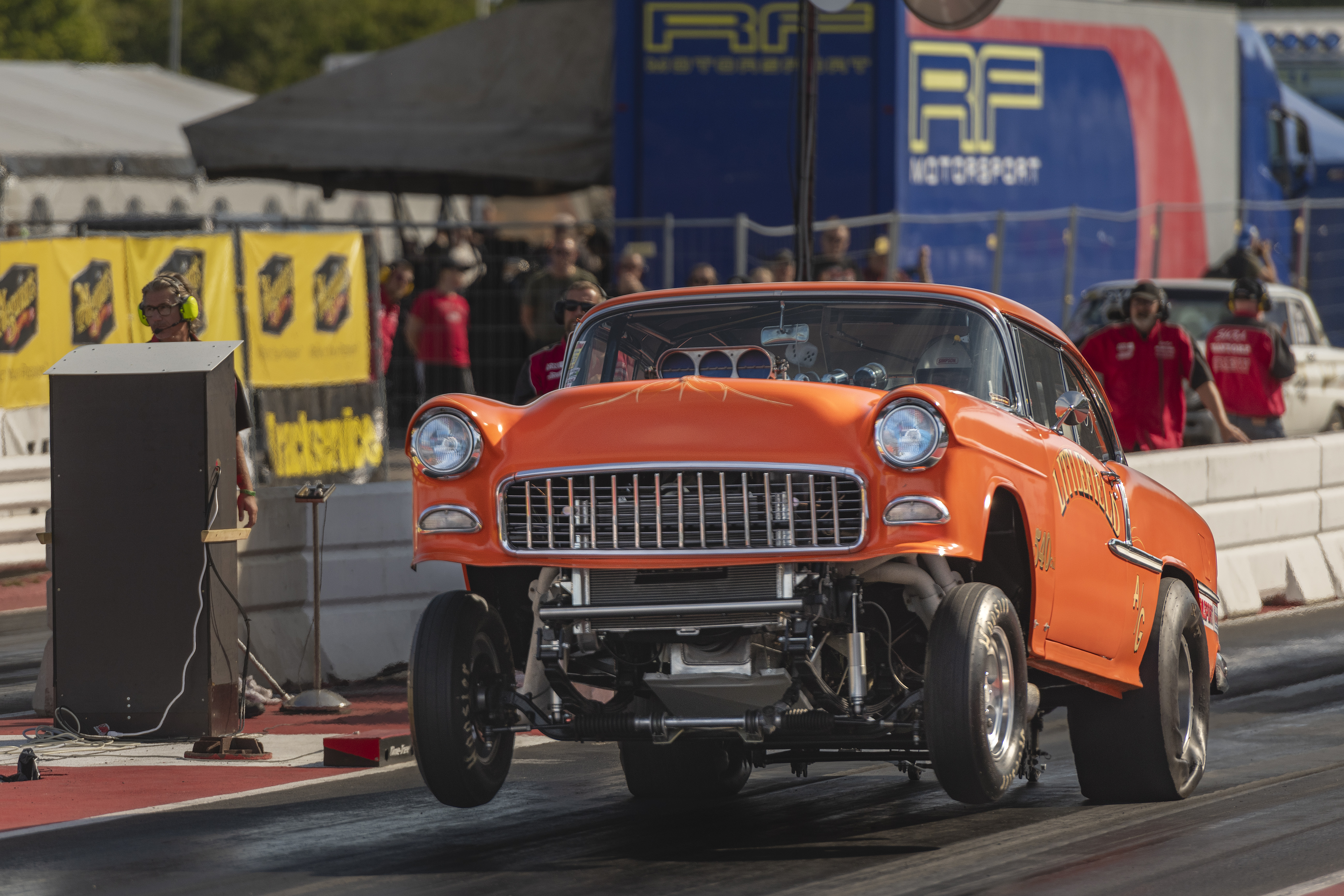
A drag race wheelie

=== Starting ===
Push starts to get engines running were necessary until the National Hot Rod Association (NHRA) mandated self-starters in 1976. After burnouts, cars would be pushed back by crews; this persisted until NHRA required reversing systems in 1980. Don Garlits was the first to do burnouts across the starting line, which is now standard practice. Each driver then backs up to and stages at the starting line.

=== Prerace preparations ===
Before each race (commonly known as a pass), each driver is allowed to perform a burnout, which heats the driving tires and lays rubber down at the beginning of the track, improving traction. The cars run through a "water box" (formerly a "bleach box", before bleach was replaced by flammable traction compound, which produced spectacular, and dangerous, flame burnouts; the hazard led NHRA to mandate use of water in the 1970s).

Modern races are started electronically by a system known as a Christmas tree, which consists of a column of lights for each driver/lane, and two light beam sensors per lane on the track at the starting line. Current NHRA trees, for example, feature one blue light (split into halves), then three amber, one green, and one red. When the first light beam is broken by a vehicle's front tire(s), the vehicle is "pre-staged" (approximately 7 inches (180 mm) from the starting line), and the pre-stage indicator on the tree is lit. When the second light beam is broken, the vehicle is "staged", and the stage indicator on the tree is lit. Vehicles may then leave the pre-stage beam, but must remain in the stage beam until the race starts.

=== Staging ===
Once one competitor is staged, their opponent has a set amount of time to stage or they will be instantly disqualified, indicated by a red light on the tree. Otherwise, once both drivers are staged, the system chooses a short delay at random (to prevent a driver being able to anticipate the start), then starts the race. The light sequence at this point varies slightly. For example, in NHRA Professional classes, three amber lights on the tree flash simultaneously, followed 0.4 seconds later by a green light (this is also known as a "pro tree"). In NHRA Sportsman classes, the amber lights illuminate in sequence from top to bottom, 0.5 seconds apart, followed 0.5 seconds later by the green light (this is also known as a "sportsman tree" or "full tree"). If a vehicle leaves the starting line before the green light illuminates, the red light for that lane illuminates instead, and the driver is disqualified (also known as red lighting). In a handicap start, the green light automatically lights up for the first driver, and the red light is only lit in the proper lane after both cars have launched if one driver leaves early, or if both drivers left early, the driver whose reaction time is worse (if one lane has a -.015 and the other lane has a -.022, the lane of the driver who committed a 0.022 is given the red light after both cars have left), as a red light infraction is only assessed to the driver with the worse infraction, if both drivers leave early. Even if both drivers leave early, the green light is automatically lit for the driver who launched later than the other (in a heads-up start, only the driver who left first is given the red light; in a bracket race start, the driver who left earlier in relation to the green light in their lane is given the red light), and they still may win the pass (as in the 2014 NHRA Auto Club Pro Stock final, Erica Enders-Stevens and Jason Line both committed red light infractions; only Line was assessed with a red light, as he was -.011 versus Enders-Stevens' -.002).

=== Measurements ===
Several measurements are taken for each race: reaction time, elapsed time, and speed. Reaction time is the period from the green light illuminating to the vehicle leaving the staging beams or breaking the guard beam. Elapsed time, often abbreviated E.T., is the period from the vehicle leaving the starting line to crossing the finish line. Speed is measured through a speed trap covering the final 66 feet (20 m) to the finish line, indicating average speed of the vehicle in that distance.

Except where a breakout rule is in place, the winner is the first vehicle to cross the finish line, and therefore the driver with the lowest combined reaction time and elapsed time. Because these times are measured separately, a driver with a slower elapsed time can actually win if that driver's advantage in reaction time exceeds the elapsed time difference. In heads-up racing, this is known as a holeshot win. In categories where a breakout rule is in effect (for example, NHRA Junior Dragster, Super Comp, Super Gas, Super Stock, and Stock classes, as well as some dial-in classes), if a competitor is faster than his or her predetermined time (a "breakout"), that competitor loses. If both competitors are faster than their predetermined times, the competitor who breaks out by less time wins. Regardless, a red light foul is worse than a breakout, except in selected sportsman and junior classes, where exceeding the absolute limit is a cause for disqualification.

=== Bracket system ===
Most race events use a traditional bracket system, where the losing car and driver are eliminated from the event while the winner advances to the next round, until a champion is crowned. Events can range from 16 to over 100 car brackets. Drivers are typically seeded by elapsed times in qualifying. In bracket racing without a breakout (such as NHRA Competition Eliminator), pairings are based on times compared to their index (faster than index for class is better). In bracket racing with a breakout (Stock, Super Stock, but also the NHRA's Super classes), the closest to the index is favorable.

A popular alternative to the standard eliminations format is the Chicago Style format (also called the Three Round format in Australia), named for the US 30 Dragstrip near Merrillville, Indiana where a midweek meet featured this format. All entered cars participate in one qualifying round, and then are paired for the elimination round. The two fastest times among winners from this round participate in the championship round. Depending on the organization, the next two fastest times may play for third, then fifth, and so forth, in consolation rounds. Currently, the National Drag Racing Championship in Australia uses the format for major categories.

=== Distances ===
The standard distance of a drag race is 1,320 feet, 402 m, or 1/4 mile (±0.2% FIA & NHRA rules). However, due to safety concerns, certain sanctioning bodies (notably the NHRA for its Top Fuel and Funny Car classes) have shortened races to 1,000 feet. Some drag strips are even shorter and run 660 feet, 201 m, or 1/8 mile. The 1,000 foot distance is now also popular with bracket racing, especially in meets where there are 1/8 mile cars and 1/4 mile cars racing together, and is used by the revived American Drag Racing League for its primary classes (not Jr Dragster). Some organizations that deal with Pro Modified and large capacity "Mountain Motor" Pro Stock cars (Professional Drag Racers Association) use the 1/8 mile distance, even if the tracks are 1/4 mile tracks.

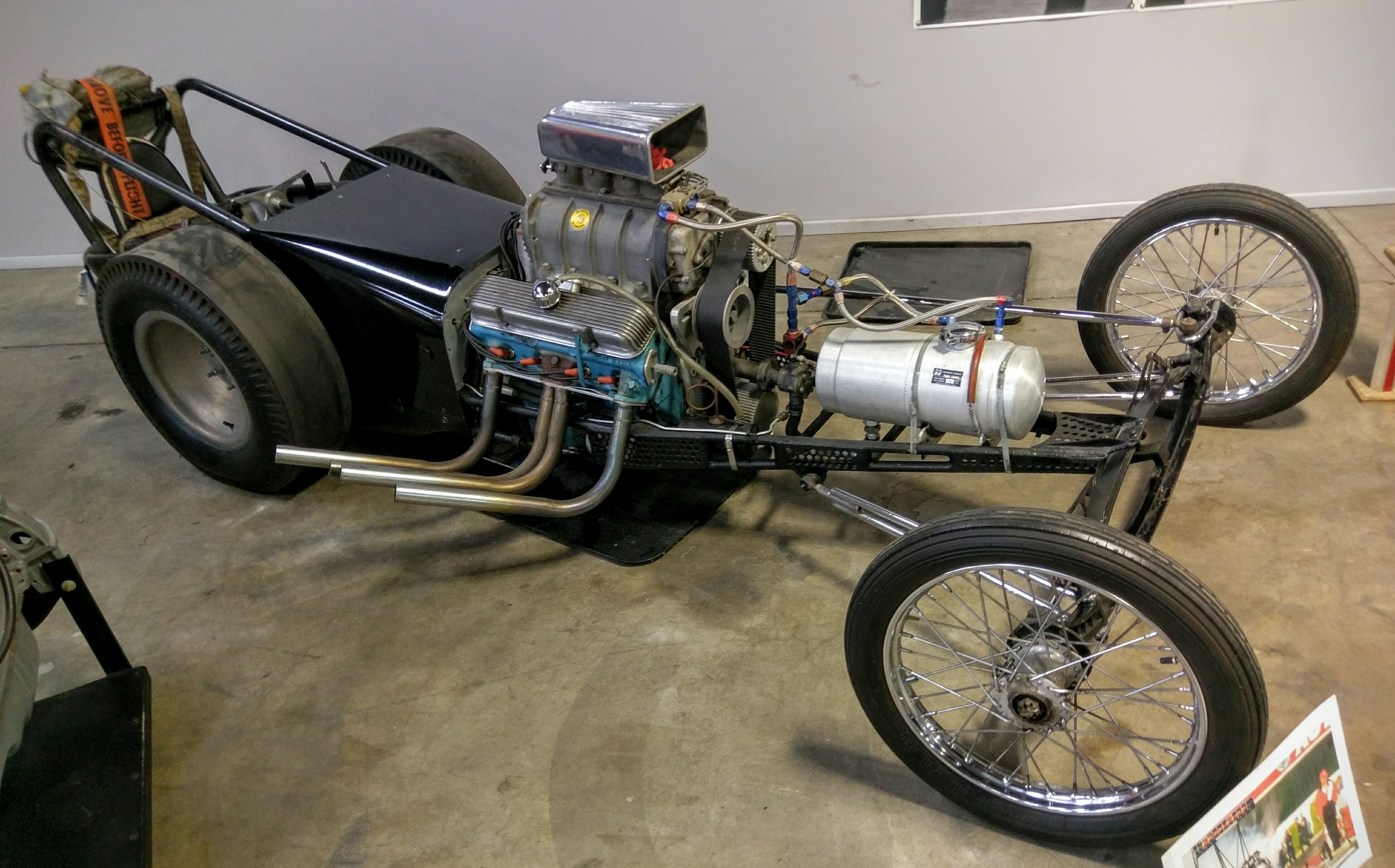
An early example, a 1958 Fuel dragster (technically, a rail), on display at the California Automobile Museum

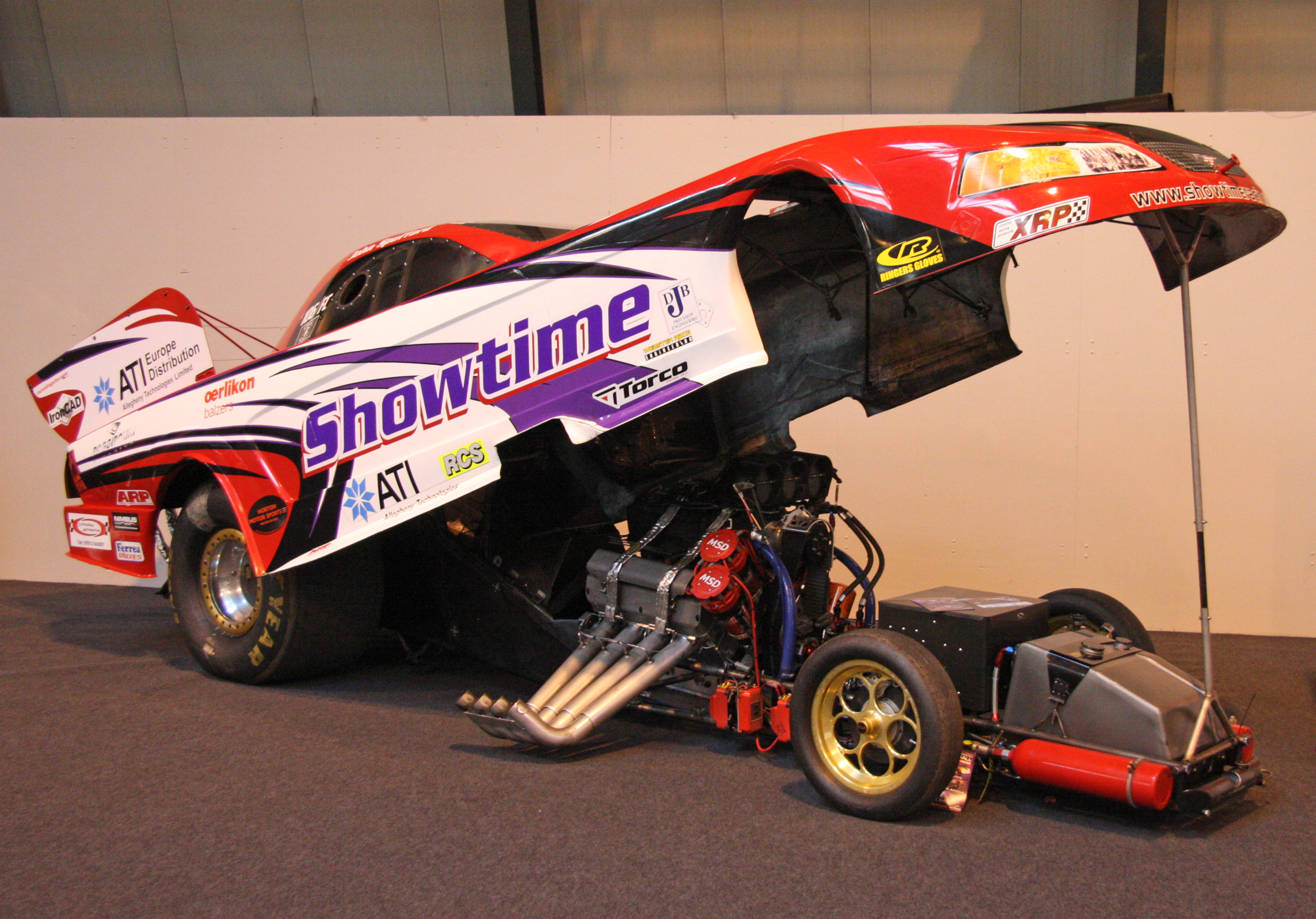
Funny Car with body up

== Racing organizations ==
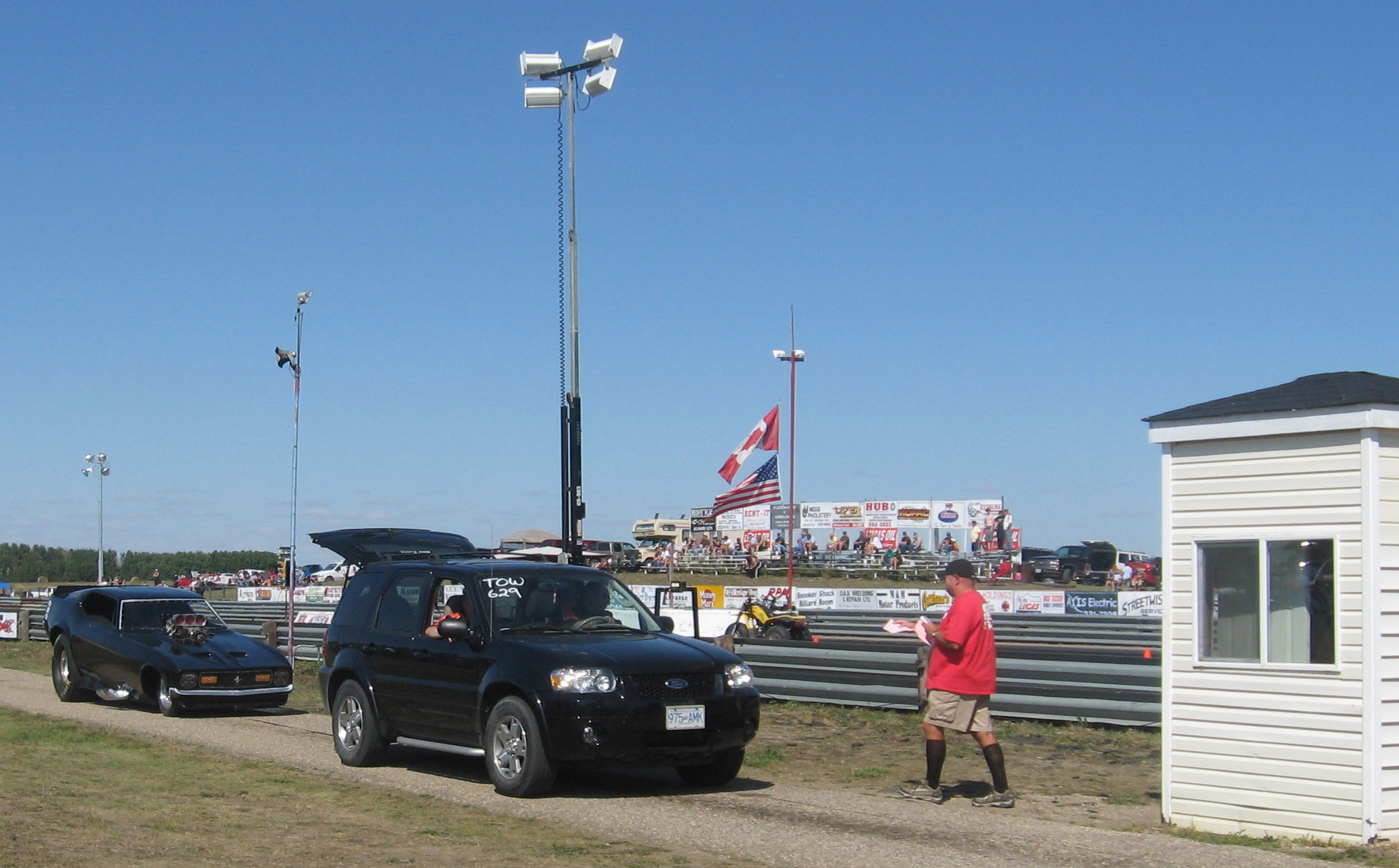
Chief Timer delivering timeslips to competitors after their passes

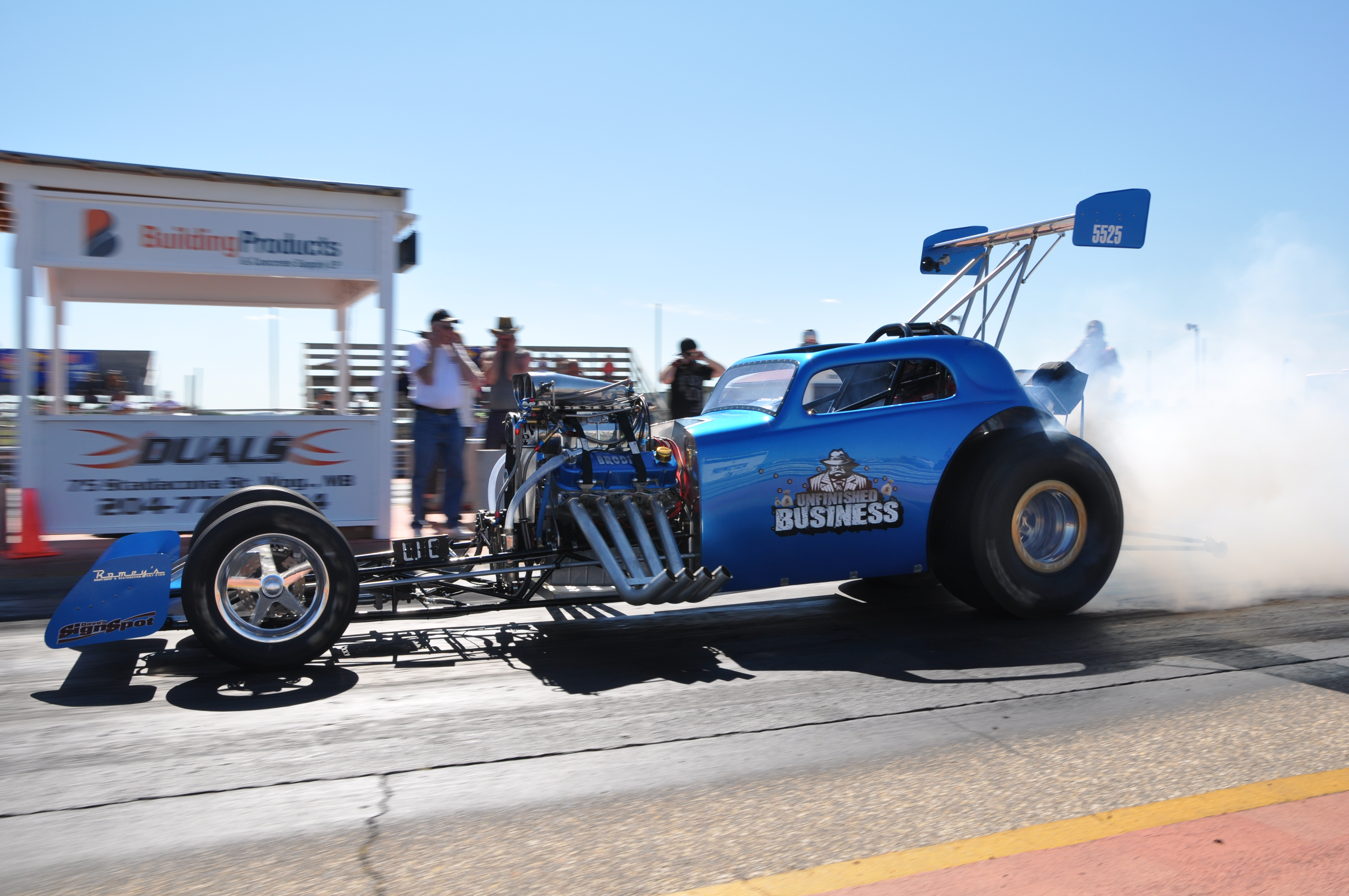
A Blown Altered doing a burnout at Interlake Dragways, Gimli, Manitoba

=== North America ===
The National Hot Rod Association (NHRA) oversees the majority of drag racing events in North America. The International Hot Rod Association (IHRA), one of the historic sanctioning bodies in drag racing, acquired the World Drag Racing Alliance (WDRA), and now represents 117 member tracks across the United States, Canada, Aruba, Australia and New Zealand.

Besides NHRA, IHRA, and WDRA, there are several other racing organizations were created over the past several decades. The Professional Drag Racers Association (PDRA), founded in 2014, races 1/8 mile with events throughout the US. The National Mustang Racers Association (NMRA), started in 1999, is considered the leader in Ford motorsports events. The National Muscle Car Association (NMCA), is the longest running major street-legal drag racing association. The NMCA provides competitive and organized national event competitions from grassroots drag racers all the way to the powerful and fast VP Racing Fuels Xtreme Pro Mod racers.

There are also niche organizations for muscle cars and nostalgia vehicles. The Nostalgia Drag Racing League (NDRL) based in Brownsburg, IN, runs a series of 1/4 mile (402 m) drag races in the Midwest for 1979 and older nostalgic appearing cars, with four classes of competition running in an index system. Pro 7.0 and Pro 7.50 run heads up 200 mile per hour (320 kilometre per hour) passes, while Pro Comp and Pro Gas run 8.0 to 10.0 indices. NDRL competition vehicles typically include Front Engine Dragsters, Altereds, Funny Cars, early Pro Stock clones, Super Stocks and Gassers.

The National Electric Drag Racing Association (NEDRA) races electric vehicles against high performance gasoline-powered vehicles such as Dodge Vipers or classic muscle cars in 1/4 and 1/8 mile (402 m & 201 m) races. The current electric drag racing record is 6.940 seconds at 201.37 mph (324.0736 km/h) for a quarter mile (402 m). Another niche organization is the VWDRC which run a VW-only championship with vehicles running under 7 seconds.

Prior to the founding of the NHRA and IHRA, smaller organizations sanctioned drag racing in the early years, which included the competing AHRA in the United States and Canada from 1955 to 2005.

=== Australia ===
The first Australian Nationals event was run in 1965 at Riverside raceway, near Melbourne. The Australian National Drag Racing Association (ANDRA) was established in 1973, and today they claim they are the "best in the world outside the United States". ANDRA sanctions races throughout Australia and throughout the year at all levels, from Junior Dragster to Top Fuel.

The ANDRA Drag Racing Series is for professional drivers and riders and includes Top Fuel, Top Alcohol, Top Doorslammer (similar to the USA Pro Modified class), Pro Stock (using 400 cubic inch engines (6.5 litres)), Top Bike and Pro Stock Motorcycle.

The Summit Sportsman Series is for ANDRA sportsman drivers and riders and includes Competition, Super Stock, Super Compact, Competition Bike, Supercharged Outlaws, Top Sportsman, Modified, Super Sedan, Modified Bike, Super Street and Junior Dragster.

In 2015, after a dispute with ANDRA, Sydney Dragway, Willowbank Raceway and the Perth Motorplex invited the International Hot Rod Association (IHRA) to sanction events at their tracks. Shortly thereafter the Perth Motorplex reverted to ANDRA sanction. Although greatly assisted by ANDRA prior to its construction, Springmount Raceway opted for IHRA sanction. The 400 Thunder Series targets professional racers to its races. Intended to be the premier Drag racing series in Australia it has never been able to run a truly National series and has been on a steady decline since its inception. Most recently Top Fuel Australia (the organization that represents the Top Fuel owners) recently extracted itself from the 400 Thunder series. ANDRA launched a new National series that will initially cater for Top Doorslammer and Top Fuel Motorcycle. This series will provide a greater National coverage than the 400 Thunder Series did and will soon add other Professional categories.

=== Europe ===
Drag racing was imported to Europe by American NATO troops during the Cold War. In the UK, drag racers used various airstrips and racing circuits before the opening of Europe's first permanent drag strip at Santa Pod Raceway in 1966. First drag races in West Germany were held beginning in the 1960s at the US Forces facilities at Ramstein Air Base and nearby Sembach Kaserne, but it was at the Hanau Army Airfield in Erlensee where officers supported drag racing and the Hanau Auto Racing Association (HARA) founded in 1968 with leading figure Jerry W. Lackey (†2023) that was leading German drag racing for decades, and in 1986 started dragracing on the Hockenheimring. In the first years, the start finish straight was used form 1/8 Racing, but in 1989 the first Quartermile was built, running into the forest section. After the fall of the Berlin Wall, in the 1990s some former Soviet and NVA airfields in former GDR were used for dragracing events.

The FIA organises a Europe-wide four wheeled championship for the Top Fuel, Top Methanol Dragster, Top Methanol Funny Car, Pro Modified and Pro Stock classes. FIM Europe organises a similar championship for bike classes. In addition, championships are run for sportsman classes in many countries throughout Europe by the various national motorsport governing bodies.

One of the greatest tournament is the yearly NitrolympiX on the Hockenheimring racetrack, the only major Drag racing even in continental Europe. Apart from Santa Pod in the UK, other FIA/FIM round are or were held in Scandinavia, in place like Gardermoen (Norway), Tierp Arena (Sweden), or Alastaro Circuit (Finland).

=== New Zealand ===
Drag racing in New Zealand started in the 1960s. The New Zealand Hot Rod Association (NZHRA) sanctioned what is believed to have been the first drag meeting at an open cut coal mine at Kopuku, south of Auckland, sometime in 1966. In 1973, the first and only purpose built drag strip opened in Meremere by the Pukekohe Hot Rod Club. In April 1993 the governance of drag racing was separated from the NZHRA and the New Zealand Drag Racing Association (NZDRA) was formed. In 2014, New Zealand's second purpose built drag strip – Masterton Motorplex – opened.

The first New Zealand Drag Racing Nationals was held in the 1966/67 season at Kopuku, near Auckland.

There are now two governing bodies operating drag racing in New Zealand with the Florida-based International Hot Rod Association sanctioning both of New Zealands major tracks at Ruapuna (Pegasus Bay Drag Racing Association) in the South Island and Meremere Dragway Inc in the North Island which is now become the best drag strip in NZ. However, the official ASN of the sport, per FIA regulations, is the New Zealand Drag Racing Association.

=== South America ===
Many countries in South America are eighth-mile tracks.

Organized drag racing in Brazil is the responsibility of Club G3, a private organization. The events take place at Autódromo de Tocancipá.

=== Brazil ===
In Brazil, local cars like Volkswagen Gol, Chevrolet Opala and Chevrolet Chevette are the show makers for Brazilian dragstrips.

=== Caribbean ===
Curaçao

On the island of Curaçao, organization of drag racing events is handled by the Curaçao Autosport Foundation (FAC)
All racing events, including street legal competitions, happen at the Curaçao International Raceway.

==== Aruba ====
On the island of Aruba, all racing events, including street legal competitions, happen at Palomarga International Raceway.

Barbados

On the island of Barbados, organization of drag racing events is done by the Barbados Association of Dragsters and Drifters. Currently the drag racing is done at Bushy Park racing circuit over 1/8 mile, while "acceleration tests" of 1/4 mile are done at the Paragon military base.

Jamaica

On the island of Jamaica, the organization of drag racing events was and still is done by the Jamaica Motoring Club (JMC)—later renamed as Jamaica Millennium Motoring Club (JMMC) in 2003—which was founded in February of 1970, and is an FIA recognized national sporting authority for motorsport. Drag racing in Jamaica dates back to the 60s, with racing being done at Vernamfield Air Force Base (known colloquially as Vernamfield or Vernam) located in the town of Gimme-Me-Bit in Clarendon. The latest major events are held under the name of Drag Rivals, organized by KenT Racing under the oversight and sanctioning of the JMMC, with sponsorship from Valvoline.

Saint Lucia

On the Island of Saint Lucia, organization of drag racing events is done by no-one. All local groups are tie ups. Currently races are held at the US Old military base also known as the "Ca Ca Beff", "The Base" near the Hewanorra International Airport in Vieux Fort.

Dominican Republic

On Santo Domingo, organization of drag racing events is done by Autodromo Sunix and they happen at the Autodromo Sunix, close to the Airport SDQ.

=== South Asia ===
Organized drag racing is rapidly growing in India. The country's first drag race meet was organized by Western India Sports Association for Autocar India in Mumbai in 2002. Since then, there have been many drag racing events in India. The most popular event is Elite Octanes' Valley Run which is held at Ambey Valley air strip in Loanavla every year.

The biggest drag series event was organized by India Speed Week with three different locations around India. After the series two riders were chosen to represent the country 2017 initiative to bring 11 times world drag racing champion Rickey Gadson to India. The initiative was executed during the Valley Run 2017 event, which gave the participants a platform to perform at the highest level globally. Rickey Gadson, as an extension of the initiative invited two of the top performing drag racers to visit USA to train and get an opportunity to represent India at the World Finals of drag racing held on 16–18 November 2018 in Valdosta GA, USA. As a result, the two riders performed in their maiden event outside India. Also during the event, Amit Sharma, the fastest drag racer in Indian drag racing history, produced a time slip of 8.87 sec's – the fastest ever by any Indian.

Drag racing is also gaining popularity in Pakistan, with private organizations sponsoring such events. The Bahria Town housing project recently organized a drag racing event in Rawalpindi with the help of some of the country's best drivers.

Sri Lanka has seen an immense growth in drag racing due to legal meets held by the Ceylon Motor Sports Club, an FIA sanctioned body. In recent years, exotic cars and Japanese power houses have been taking part in these popular events.

=== Japan ===
Drag racing is performed in Japan as the racing sport was initially influenced by American Servicemen and US movies and like in the early US-scene days, impromptu street drag racing occurred and eventually tracks were found to hold more official events. The local scene reduced after the closure of Sendai Hi-Lands and the withdrawal of HKS official factory team. Currently, Japan Drag Festival dragfestival holds No-Prep events at Central Circuit セントラルサーキットオフィシャルブログ and Twin Motegi Motorsports | Mobility Resort Motegi

=== South Africa ===
Drag racing is an established sport in South Africa, with a number of strips around the country including Tarlton International Raceway and ODI Raceway. Drag racing is controlled by Motorsport South Africa and all drivers are required to hold a valid Motorsport South Africa license. Drivers can compete in a number of categories including Top Eliminator, Senior Eliminator, Super Competition Eliminator, Competition Eliminator, Pro Street Bikes, Superbike Eliminator, Supersport Shootout (motorcycle), Street Modified, and Factory Stock.

Sweden

Drag racing in Sweden is organised today under several frameworks and sanctioning bodies. Until 2012, only the Swedish Automobile Sports Federation (SBF) and the Swedish Motorcycle and Snowmobile Federation (SVEMO) managed national licences and events. Following a ruling by the Market Court (Marknadsdomstolen decision 2012:16, case A 5/11, 20 December 2012), SBF's exclusive right to sanction competitions was deemed anti-competitive.

Since then, independent organisers and companies have entered the field, including Nitroz AB, which collaborates with clubs and event organisers to manage race administration, licensing, timing, and safety standards.

A Swedish-developed timing system, TimeTree, is used on most drag racing tracks in the Nordic countries and integrates with dragracing.eu, an online platform for event entry, results, and live data streaming.

Permanent drag racing tracks in Sweden include Pite Dragway, Tierp Arena (Tierp), Mantorp Park (Östergötland), Malmö Raceway (Malmö), Helsinge Raceway (Söderhamn) and Sundsvall Raceway (Sundsvall). Malmö Raceway is operated by the non-profit SRIF (Skåne Racers Ideella Förening) and measures 201 m (1/8 mile), operating during the summer season. Lindesberg also has a purpose-built drag racing facility with concrete safety walls.

Historically, many events have been held on airfields, for example in Barkarby, Borlänge, Bulltofta, Eskilstuna, Fällfors, Hagfors, Mora, Nyköping, Orsa, Piteå, Tullinge, Uppsala, Vårgårda, and Västerås.

Drag racing in Sweden features a broad range of classes for both cars and motorcycles, from junior categories to professional ones such as Top Fuel Dragster. Drivers may begin racing the year they turn eight in Junior Dragster or ten in Junior Dragbike.

=== Russian Federation ===
Drag racing in Russia started in 2004 in Moscow when the Russian Automotive Federation (RAF) sanctioned it as an official motorsport. Drag Racing became popular in Russia after "The Fast and the Furious" film in 2001, but competitions were illegal before 2004. The most outstanding drag racing event of the early years was "DRAG BITVA" (Drag Battle) which took place in Krasnoyarsk, Siberia from 2005 to 2008. Krasnoyarsk is located in the middle of Russia, so it was the best place to bring all the fastest cars from all over the country. Due to the financial situation "DRAG BITVA" was canceled in 2009 and never came back. It was difficult times for drag racing in Russia from 2009 to 2014, but it was supported by enthusiasts in every region. There were a lot of competitions but it was not as big as "DRAG BITVA". In 2014 Dragtimes company in partnership with SMP Racing became the Russian Drag Racing Championship (SMP RDRC) promoters, since then Drag Racing in Russia became more professional. From the very beginning to 2014 only streetcars were allowed to compete in Russia. Now it's also allowed to run promods and dragsters in SMP RDRC. Thanks to the efforts of SMP RDRC promoters in 2019 the first professional dragstrip in Russia "RDRC Racepark" was built. It's located near Moscow in 40 kilometers of downtown at the former airfield Bykovo. It gave many opportunities to test the cars and make new records. Before the track was built, competitions took place on straight parts of circuits, so it was not allowed to prepare the whole 1/4 mile, only 1/8 and the tracks were available for drag racers except racing weekends of local or national events. From the very beginning one of the main ideas of the promoters was to increase the quality and reach of live broadcasts, so SMP RDRC became the first racing series with its video production and remains so to this day.

Russian Championship has four classes:

- Pro ET (Bracket class) – most of the participants here are running streetcars (e. g. BMW M5, Audi RS6, Porsche 911, Nissan GT-R, Lamborghini Huracan, etc.). It's allowed to run the car without a roll cage. Breakout for the class is 9.6 sec.
- Street – full-body streetcars. Roll cage and all FIA or SFI safety equipment is mandatory. The class includes a lot of different cars (e. g. Toyota Supra, Audi TT RS, Jeep Grand Cherokee SRT-8, Honda Civic, Porsche 911 Turbo S, VAZ 2110, etc.). Breakout for the class is 8.6 sec.
- Pro Street – full-body streetcars and 3/4 chassis cars. Breakout for the class is 7.6 sec.
- SuperPro Street – door slammers, promods, dragsters, 3/4 chassis cars. The only limitation in the class is breakout which is 6.8 sec.

Regional Series also have four classes divided by ET:

- Stock – Breakout 11.9 sec.
- Super Stock – Breakout 10.9 sec.
- Super Gas – Breakout 9.9 sec.
- Super Comp – Breakout 8.9 sec.

The national record belongs to 4-time national champion Dmitry Samorukov: 6.325 seconds at 328.76 km/h (204.28 mph). It was set in a special record run in 2016 on Dodge Viper Doorslammer in Grozny, Chechen Republic at "Fort Grozny" racetrack.

Dmitry Samorukov was the first Russian participant of the FIA European Championship on a newly built Chevrolet Camaro in the most competitive Promod class in 2019. After six stages of the competition, he took 10th of 38 places overall.

Russian driver Dmitry Kapustin on Nissan Skyline GT-R R32 is holding the European record of AWD streetcars: 7.182 seconds at 312.77 km/h (194.35 mph). The record was set in a qualifying run in Grozny, Chechen Republic at "Fort Grozny" racetrack in 2018.

1/2 mile races are also popular in Russia. "Unlim 500+" is the main 1/2 mile race in Russia. It's a supercar and sportscar festival where only 500+ hp cars are allowed (e. g. Nissan GT-R, McLaren 720S, Lamborghini Aventador, Porsche 911, Ferrari 488, etc.). The national record on 1/2 mile distance also belongs to Dmitry Samorukov on Nissan GT-R R 35: 13.305 seconds at 346.48 km/h (215.29 mph). The record was set on a test and tune day at the "RDRC Racepark" track in 2020.

== Classes ==
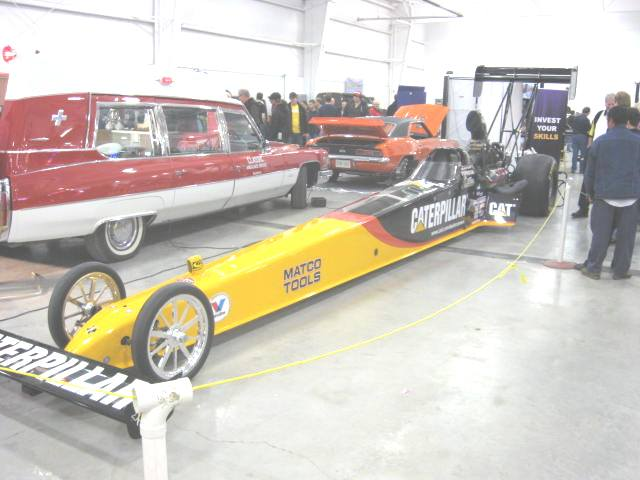
Caterpillar-sponsored dragster. Note wide slicks and high-mounted wing, to assist traction.

There are hundreds of classes in drag racing, each with different requirements and restrictions on things such as weight, engine size, body style, modifications, and many others. NHRA and IHRA share some of these classes, but many are solely used by one sanctioning body or the other. The NHRA boasts over 200 classes, while the IHRA has fewer. Some IHRA classes have multiple sub-classes in them to differentiate by engine components and other features. There is even a class for aspiring youngsters, Junior Dragster, which typically uses an eighth-mile track, also favored by VW racers.

In 1997, the FIA (cars) and UEM (bikes) began sanctioning drag racing in Europe with a fully established European Drag Racing Championship, in cooperation (and rules compliance) with NHRA. The major European drag strips include Santa Pod Raceway in Podington, England; Alastaro Circuit, Finland; Mantorp Park, Sweden; Gardermoen Raceway, Norway and the Hockenheimring in Germany.

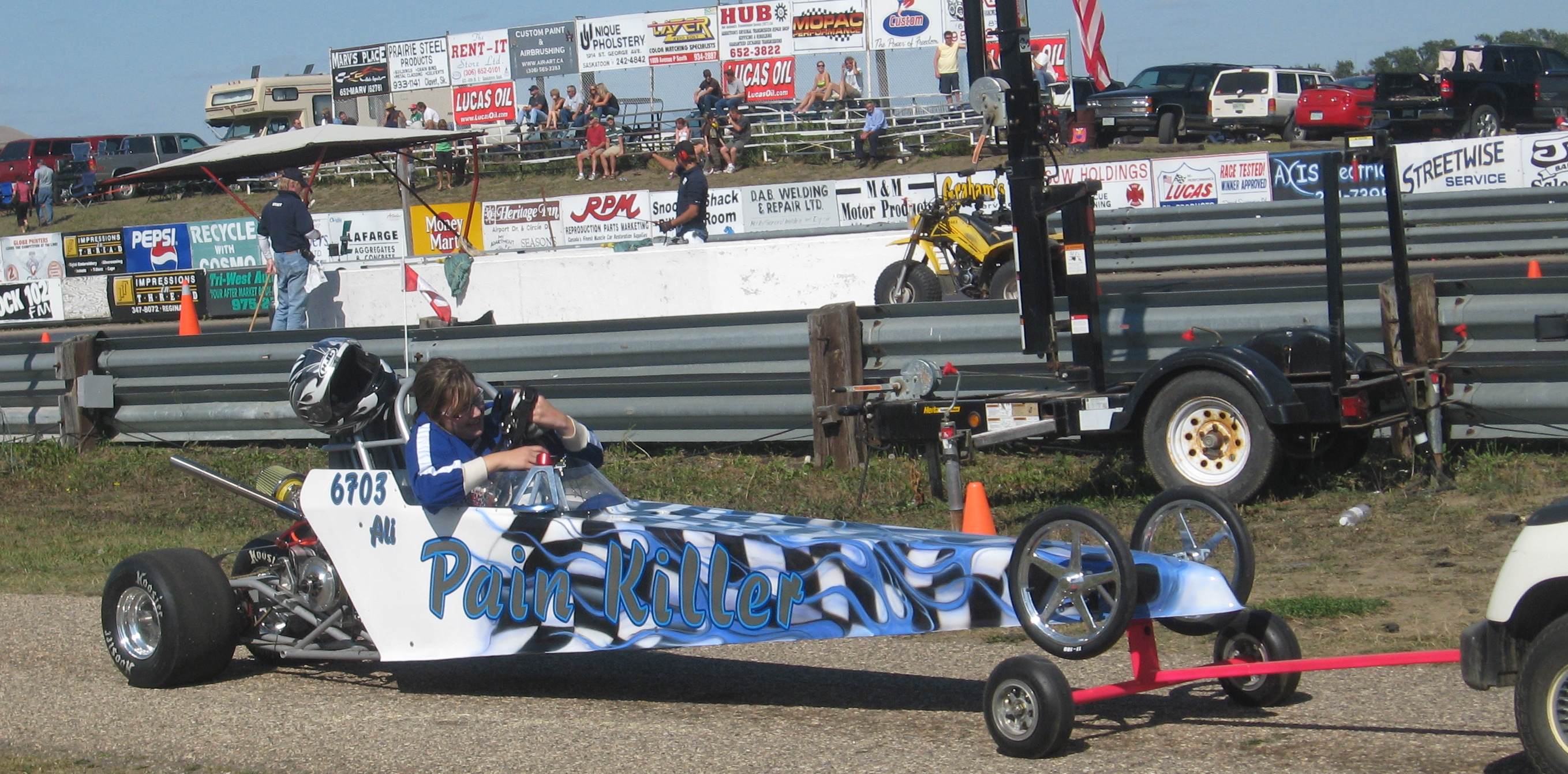
Pain Killer J/D. Note the driver, helmet off, is still in the car, which is under tow on the return road, headed for the pits.

There is a somewhat arbitrary definition of what constitutes a "professional" class. The NHRA includes 5 pro classes; Top Fuel, Funny Car, Pro Stock, Pro Modified and Pro Stock Motorcycle. The FIA features a different set of 5 pro classes; Top Fuel, Top Methanol Dragster, Top Methanol Funny Car, Pro Modified and Pro Stock. Other sanctioning bodies have similarly different definitions. A partial list of classes includes:

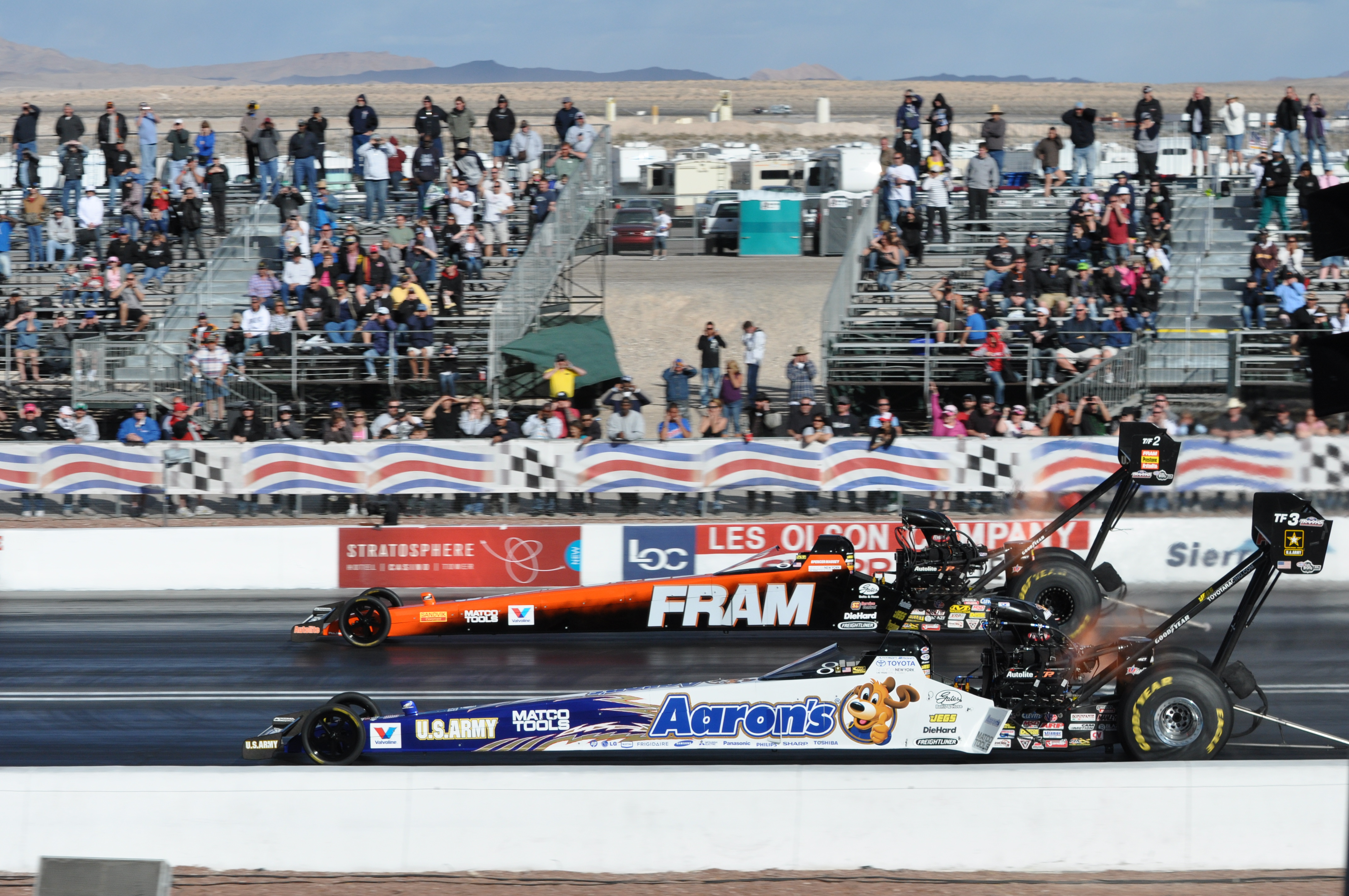
Top Fuel dragsters

- Top Fuel Dragster (TF/D). The dragsters, or "diggers", are the fastest class. Among the fastest-accelerating machines in the world, these cars can cover the dragstrip in less than 3.7 seconds and record trap speeds over 330 mph (530 km/h). Under current rules, Modern Top Fuel dragsters are 25 ft (7.6 m) long and weigh 2,320 lb (1,050 kg) in race-ready trim. Methanol mixed with up to 90% nitromethane is used as fuel.

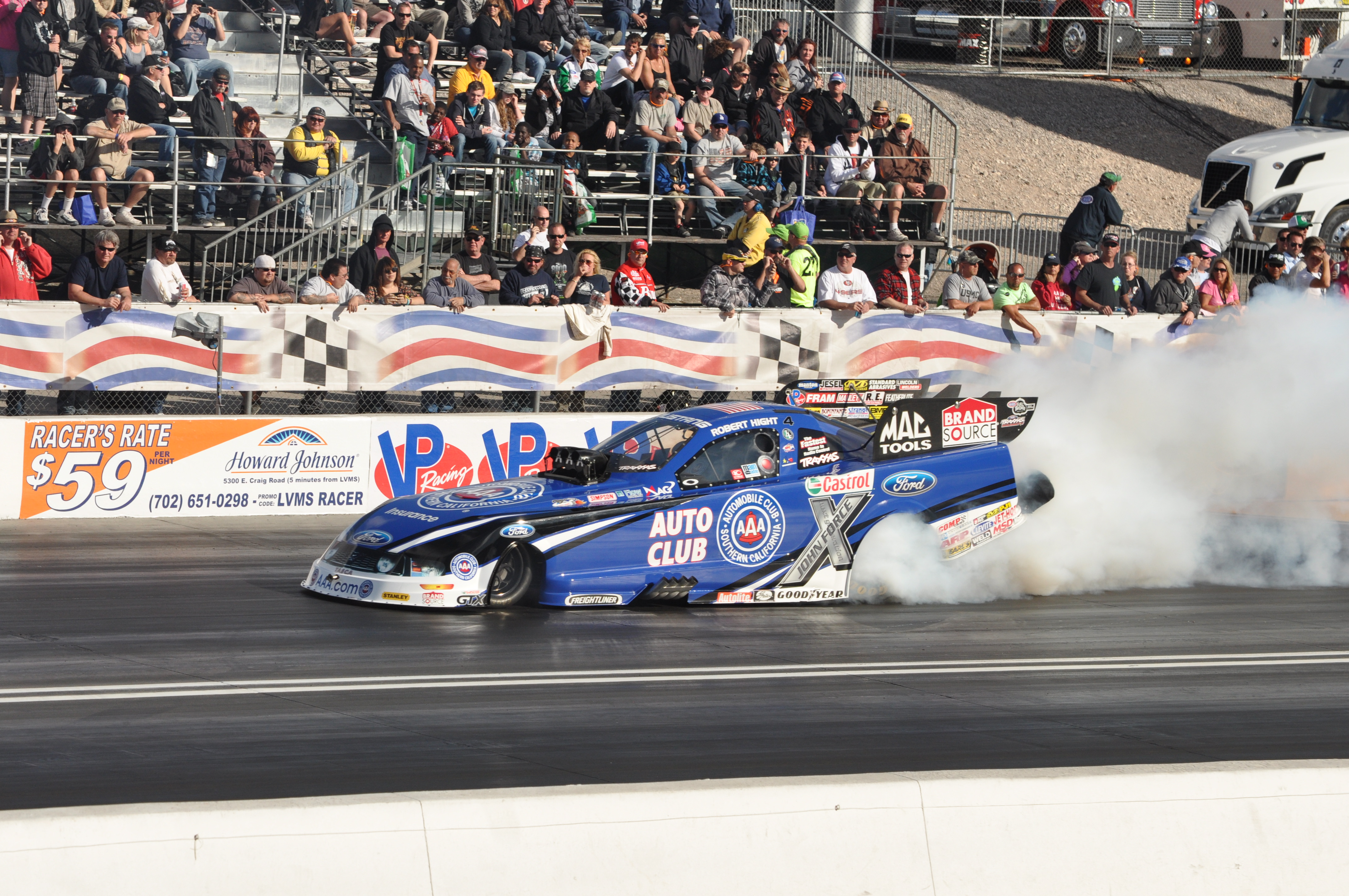
Typical Funny Car

- Top Fuel Funny Car (TF/FC). Similar to their dragster counterparts but with a shorter wheelbase and a carbon-fiber body that loosely resembles a production automobile, Funny Cars, or "floppers", routinely run in the 4.0s and can exceed 315 mph. In 2017, NHRA driver Robert Hight ran a career-best ET of 3.793 and speed of 339.87 mph.

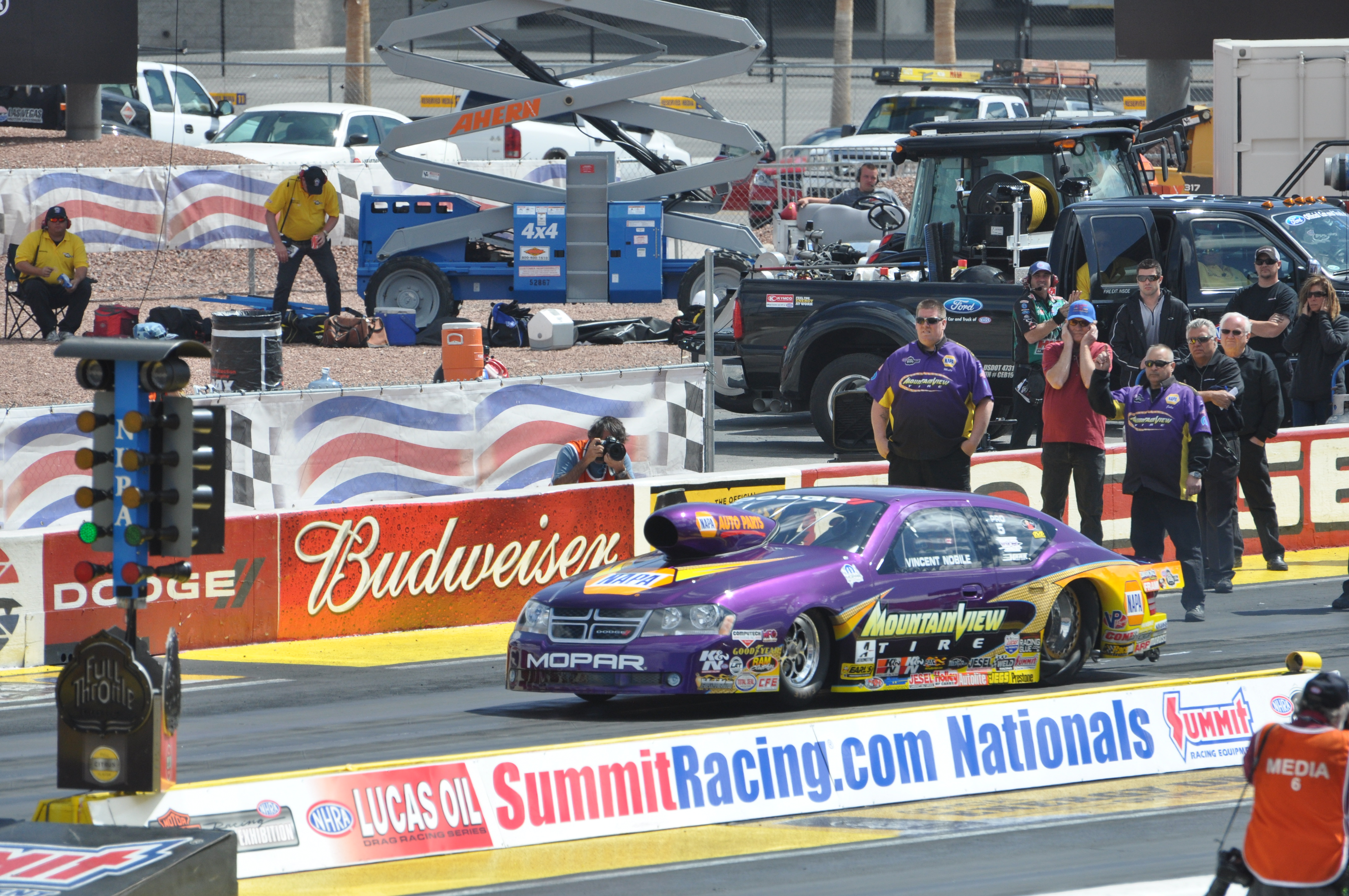
A typical Pro Stock car

- Pro Stock (NHRA, MMPSA). Often called "factory hot rods" because of their resemblance to production-based cars (and because they must maintain a relatively stock appearance), and commonly known as "doorslammers", Pro Stockers can record quarter-mile times in the 6.4 second range, and speeds over 210 mph (340 km/h). They can rev to more than 10,500 rpm and make in excess of 1,300 hp (970 kW). NHRA engines can be no more than 500-cubic-inch (8.2 L) displacement while MMPSA cars can run a maximum of 820 cubic inches (13.4 L) (called "Mountain Motors"). In Australia, engines can be no more than 400-cubic-inch (6.6 L). Both classes require the motors to be naturally aspirated.
- Pro Stock Motorcycle (NHRA). These highly modified vehicles, which can run under 6.8 seconds at more than 195 mph, feature a purpose-built tube chassis and a lightweight, aerodynamically enhanced replica of original bodywork.
- Pro Modified (Pro Mod). Known as Top Doorslammer in Australia. Some engine restrictions, very high power. Cars can run superchargers, turbochargers, or nitrous oxide. Cars running blowers are limited to 527 cubic inches (8.6 L) while cars with nitrous can run up to 740 cubic inches (12.1 L). This class is globally recognised, although the name differs between North America and Australia.
- Top Alcohol Dragster (TA/D). Known as Top Methanol Dragster in FIA competition. Top Alcohol Dragsters resemble Top Fuelers, but have significant differences. They may use a supercharged methanol-burning engine or an injected nitromethane combination. They can run in the 5.1s at more than 280 mph.
- Top Alcohol Funny Car (TA/FC). Known as Top Methanol Funny Car in FIA competition. Similar in physical appearance to their nitro-burning Funny Car counterparts, Top Alcohol Funny Cars are restricted to the use of methanol fuel and have three-speed transmissions. They can run in the 5.4s at more than 265 mph. In the IHRA, Alcohol Funny Car is the fifth pro category, replacing NHRA's Pro Stock Bike.

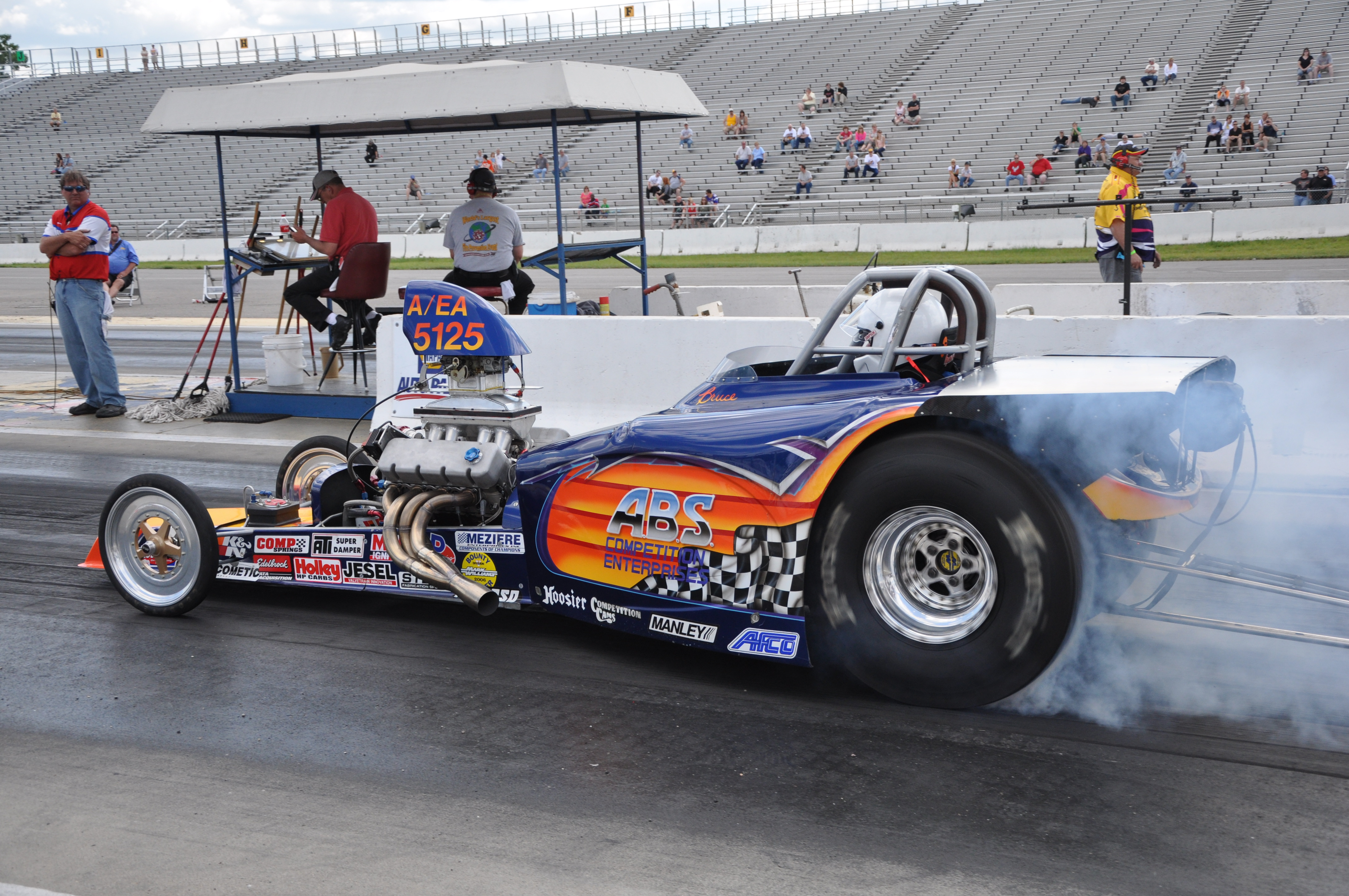
A typical Comp car

- Competition Eliminator. This is the NHRA class with the most variety. Each of its 88 sections is assigned an index based on what a well-built car should run, and races are handicapped according to those indexes.
- Outlaw Series
- Pro FWD
- Sport Front-Wheel-Drive (SFWD). This is a class that is dedicated to solely front wheel drive vehicles. One of the motivations behind the creation of this class was to keep cars as original looking as they could possibly be. SFWD is one of the most common and popular import drag racing classes. The two most common vehicles in this class are the Honda Civic and the Acura Integra. In this class, the number one restriction is that each vehicle must retain its original chassis. No modification to the OEM floorboard or Firewall is permitted. In addition, at least one headlight and both brake lights must be fully functional. Suspension and brake modifications are allowed to a certain extent. Aftermarket components are permitted as long as the original mounting points are not modified. All four brakes must be retained and parachutes are permitted. The stock dashboard and windshield must be retained along with the car's original interior from the front seats forward, while rear seats as well as passenger-side seat may be removed. Racing gas or E85 may be used; methanol may not. Internal engine modifications of all types, aftermarket engine blocks, and engine swaps are permitted. Engines may use nitrous oxide or be turbocharged. Tires may be a maximum of 25 in (640 mm) tall and 9.5 in (240 mm) in tread width. All cars must meet a minimum weight requirement of 2,200 lb (1,000 kg), plus any weight penalties teams may incur for having certain equipment installed that would have given them too much of an advantage over the competition.
- Stick Shift. Reserved for vehicles with a manual transmission. The rising popularity of automatic transmissions in drag racing created the demand for these classes. Popular sanctioning bodies include United Manual Transmission Racers, Pro Stick Racing, Rocky Mountain Stick Shifters, and Ozark Mountain Super Shifters.
- Super Comp. The quickest of the heads-up Super classes (8.90 index) is composed primarily of dragsters. Most cars are capable of running well under the index but use electronic aids to run close to it without breaking out.

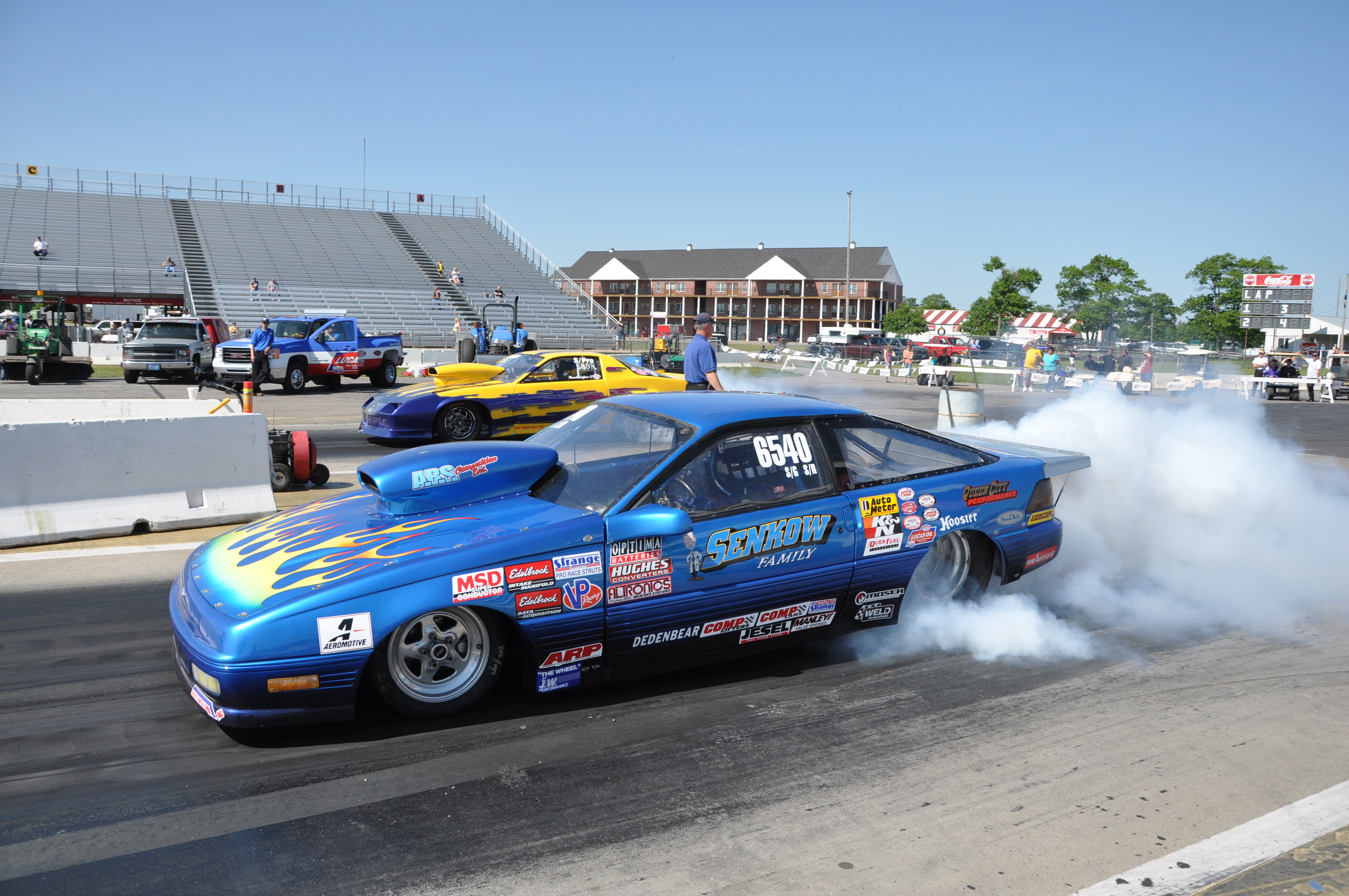
Super Gas Probe

- Super Gas. Super Gas entries, which run on a 9.90 index, are primarily full-bodied cars and street roadsters. No dragsters or altereds are permitted. As in Super Comp, competitors use electronic aids to run as close to the class standard without going under.
- Super Street. Racers compete on a fixed 10.90 index. All vehicles must be full-bodied cars and weigh no less than 2,800 pounds except for six-cylinder cars (2,000) and four-cylinder and rotary-powered cars (1,200). Engine and chassis modifications are virtually unlimited. The Christmas Tree is a Pro Tree but with a 0.500 second light instead of 0.400 seconds, allowing drivers to transition from standard to professional trees.

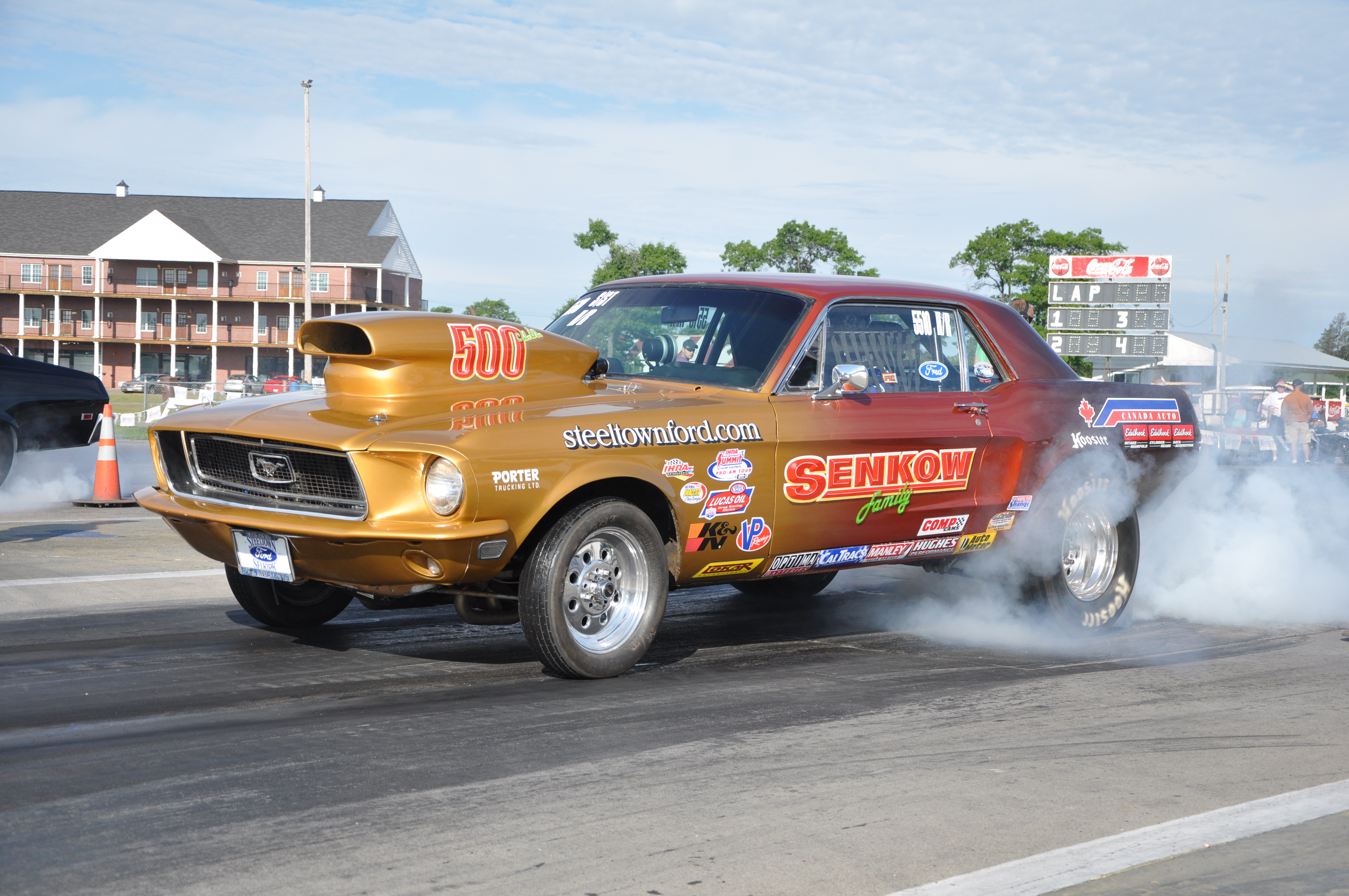
Super Street Mustang

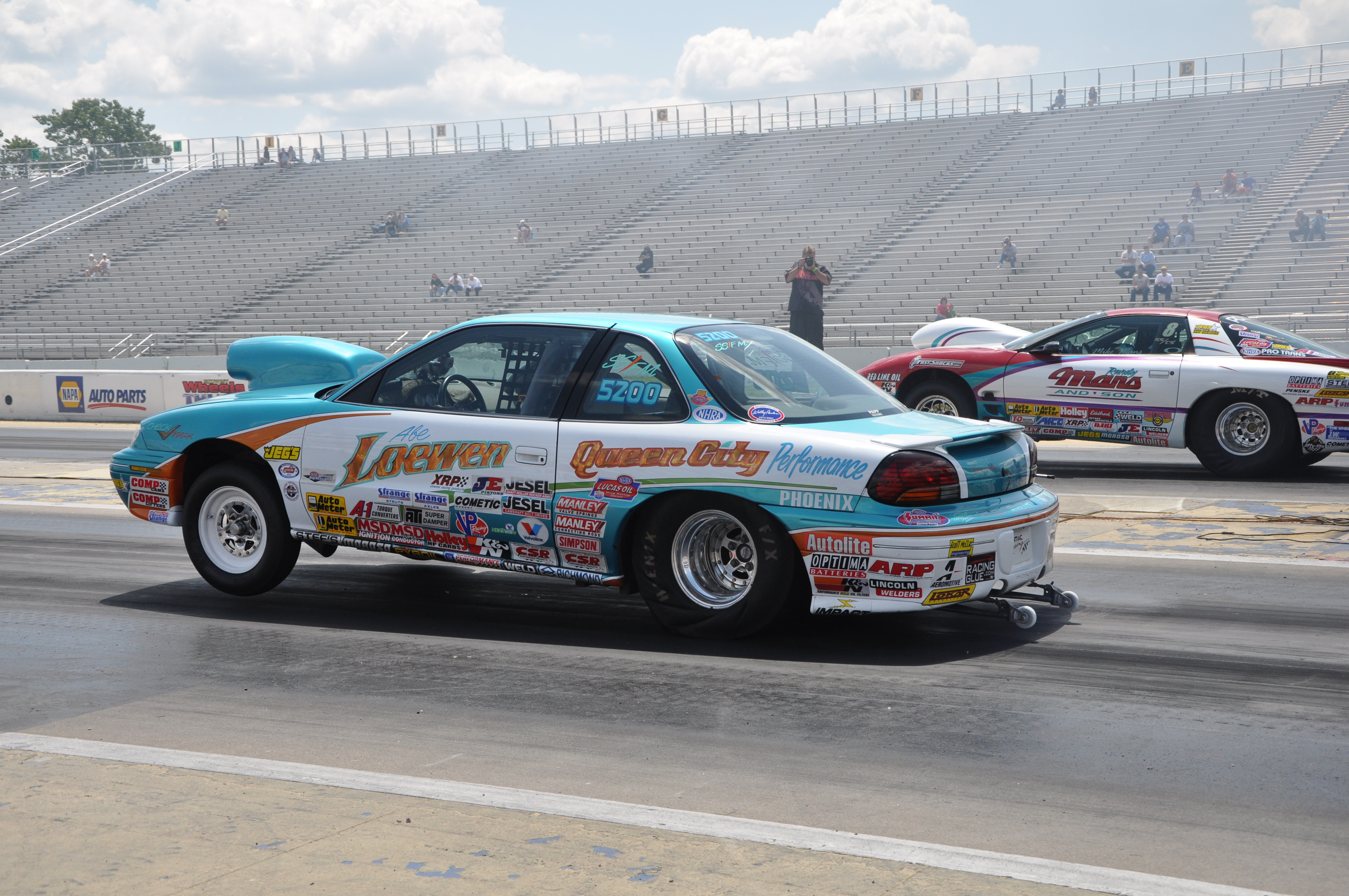
A typical Super Stock car

- Super Stock. Super Stock vehicles resemble ordinary passenger cars, but are actually heavily modified. Entries are classified using factory shipping weight and horsepower and compete on indexes. The breakout rule is enforced.

- Stock. Stock cars are similar to Super Stockers, but rules regarding everything from engine modifications to body alterations are much stricter. Virtually any car is eligible to compete, and entries are classified using factory shipping weight and horsepower.
- Sport Compact
- Top Sportsman (NHRA, ANDRA). Competitors in these full-bodied entries may choose their own dial-in for eliminations, generally from 6.00 to 7.99 seconds. Full Tree starts are used, and the breakout rule is enforced. Cars can run in the sixes at more than 200 mph (320 km/h).

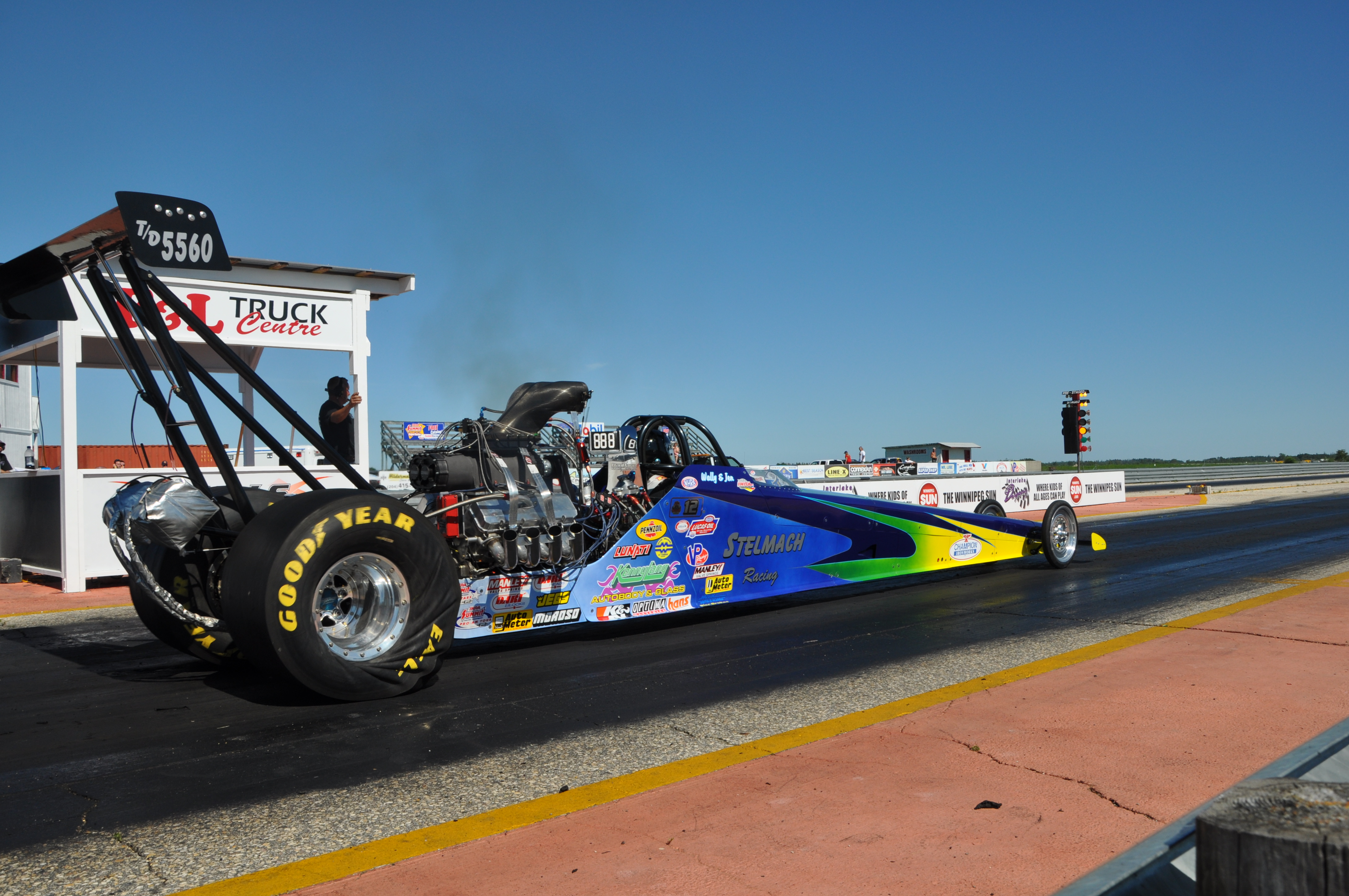
Blown Top Dragster

- Top Dragster (T/D) (NHRA, ANDRA). Competitors in these open-wheel entries may choose their own dial-in for eliminations, generally from 6.00 to 7.70 seconds. Full tree starts are used, and the breakout rule is enforced. Cars can run in the sixes at more than 200 mph (320 km/h). Cars can run any combination of motor: blown, turbo, nitrous or just all motor.
- Top Fuel Funny Bike (high performance 5 second bikes)
- Nostalgia Super Stock
- NHRA and ANDRA Summit Racing series Super Pro, Pro, and bike.
- Junior Dragster (racers between the ages of 8 and 18 may race a half scale version of the sport's fastest car, Top Fuel Dragster. Juniors run as follows: 12.90-slower for 8-9 year olds, 10-12 year olds at 8.90, and 13-18 year olds 7.90 and slower at a top speed of 85 mph). These cars race at 1/8 mile or 1/16 mile.
- NHRA new class for Juniors is JR COMP running 6.90s at a top speed of 110 miles per hour (180 km/h) (1/8 mile or 1/16 mile).

A complete listing of all classes can be found on the respective NHRA and ANDRA official websites.

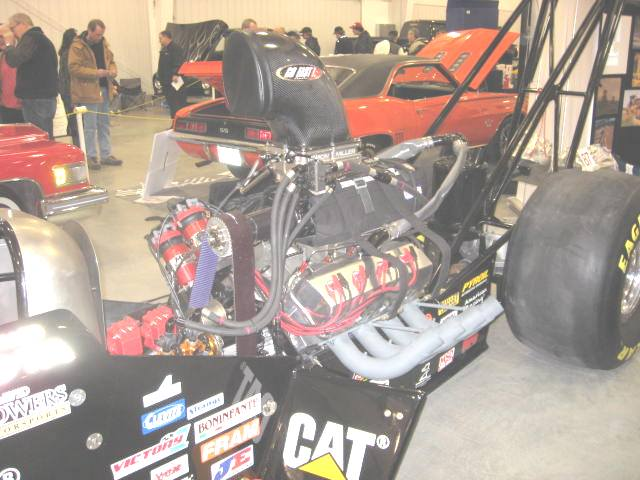
Dragster engine with dual-plug heads, dual ignition magnetos, and intake snorkel

The UEM also has a different structure of professional categories with Top Fuel Bike, Super Twin Top Fuel Bike, and Pro Stock Bike contested, leaving the entire European series with a total of 8 professional categories.

To allow different cars to compete against each other, some competitions are raced on a handicap basis, with faster cars delayed on the starting line enough to theoretically even things up with the slower car. This may be based on rule differences between the cars in stock, super stock, and modified classes, or on a competitor's chosen "dial-in" in bracket racing.

For a list of drag racing world records in each class, see Dragstrip § Quarter mile times.

== Dial-in ==
A 'dial-in' is a time the driver estimates it will take their car to cross the finish line, and is generally displayed on one or more windows so the starter can adjust the starting lights on the tree accordingly. The slower car will then get a head start equal to the difference in the two dial-ins, so if both cars perform perfectly, they would cross the finish line dead even. In most classes (excluding NHRA Competition Eliminator), if either car goes faster than its dial-in (called breaking out), it is disqualified regardless of who has the lower elapsed time; if both cars break out, the one who breaks out by the smallest amount wins. If both cars break out by the same martin, the first to the line wins. However, if a driver had jump-started (red light) or crossed a boundary line, both violations override any break out (except in some classes with an absolute break out rule such as Junior classes).

The effect of the bracket racing rules is to place a premium on consistency of performance of the driver and car rather than on raw speed, in that victory goes to the driver able to precisely predict elapsed time, whether it is fast or slow. This in turn makes victory much less dependent on budget, and more dependent on skill, making it popular with casual weekend racers.

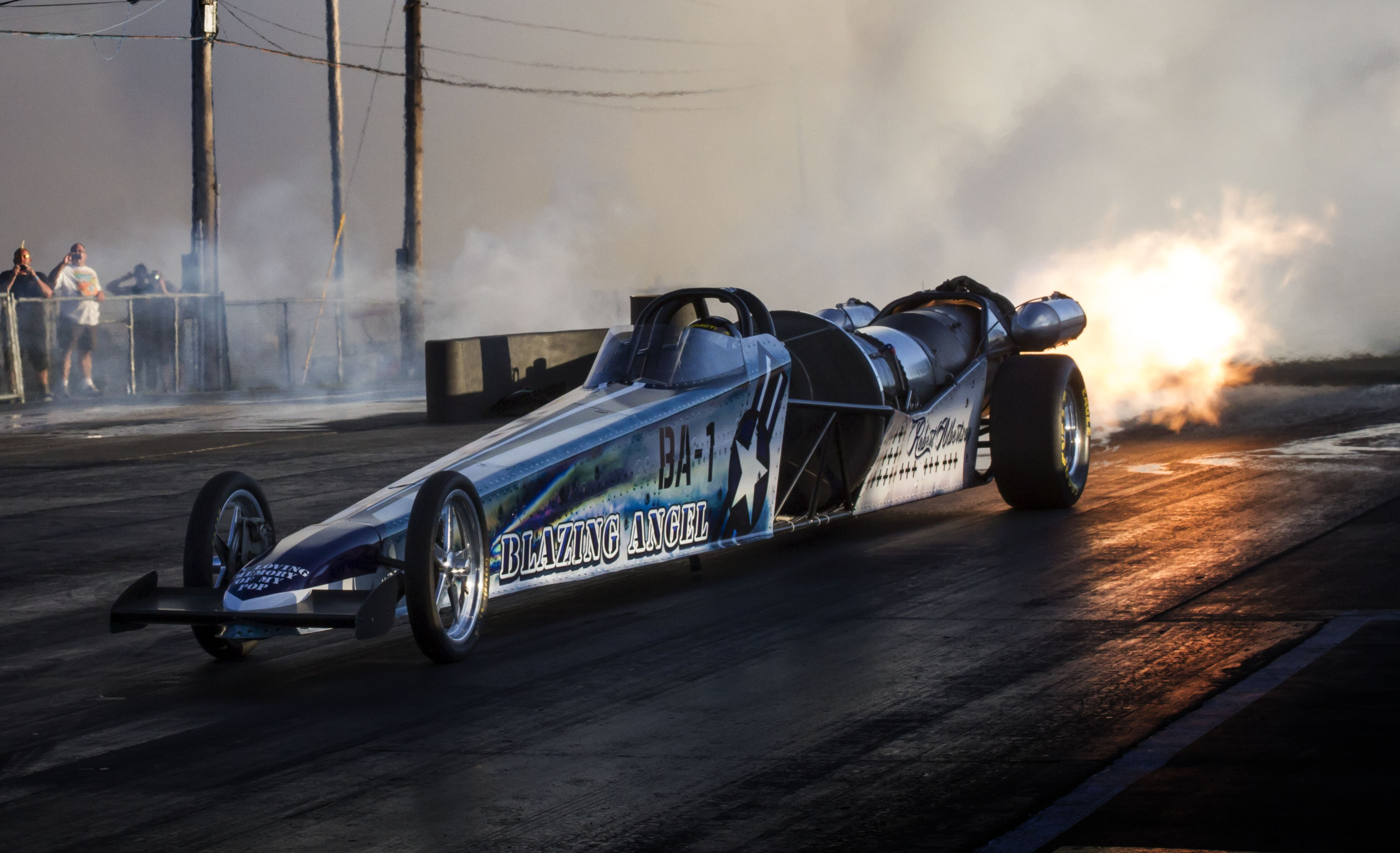
Blazing Angel Jet Dragster

== Historic cars ==
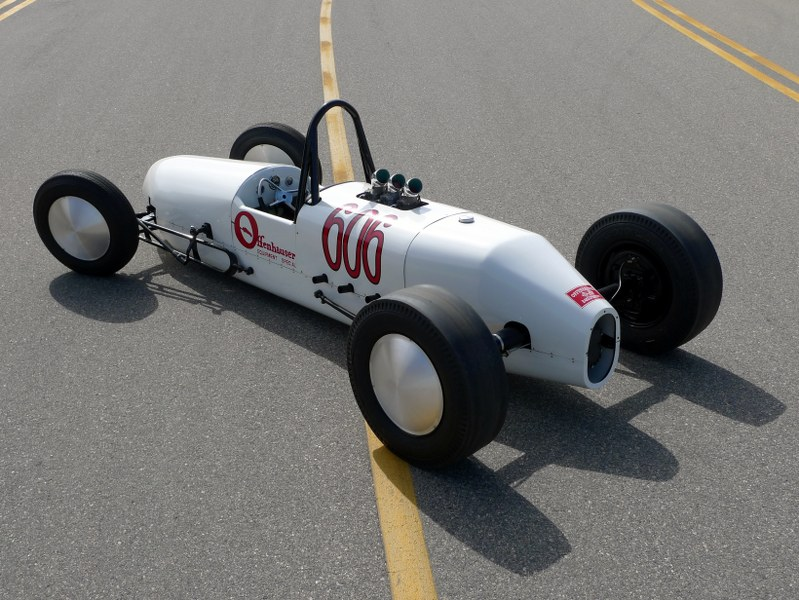
Smokin' White Owl, built by "Ollie" Morris in 1954

- 1954 – first slingshot, built by Mickey Thompson; Smokin' White Owl built by Ollie Morris, first purpose-built rear-engined dragster and first to use a Chevrolet V8 engine.
- 1962 – the Greer–Black–Prudhomme dragster, with the best win record in NHRA history.
- 1966 – Don Nicholson's Eliminator I, the first true Funny Car, built by Logghe Brothers.
- 1971 – Swamp Rat XIV (or Swamp Rat 1-R), first successful rear-engined dragster, built by Don Garlits; Ed Donovan introduces the 417 Donovan hemi, an aluminum copy of the Chrysler.
- 1974 – first tube chassis Pro Stock car, Bill Jenkins' 1972 Chevrolet Vega.
- 1979 – Vanishing Point, rocket-powered funny car built by Sammy Miller, set current standing world record for fastest quarter-mile time (3.58 seconds) in 1984.

== Glossary ==
- Back half – the second half of a track, e.g. from the 1/8 mile to mark to the 1,000 foot or 1/4 mile mark for a standard track
- Beam – electronic device (e.g. an optical beam) at the starting line to detect a car's staging position
- Big tire – Car with a set of rear tires taller than 28.5 inches tall and or wider than 12.5 inches of tread. Car may have modifications to the rear frame rails and suspension system to allow the large tires to fit under the car. Compare Small tire.
- Bottle – nitrous system; also known as the jug.
- Blanket – a ballistic cover, typically over the supercharged intake manifold assembly to contain shrapnel, in the case of an explosion.
- Blow – see Blown.
- Blower – supercharger (occasionally turbocharger); in '90s, generally grouped as "power adder" with turbocharger and nitrous
- Blown – supercharged, when describing a functioning engine; wrecked, when describing an engine failure.
- Blowover – flipping of a car, due to air under car lifting front wheels
- Breakout – in bracket racing, running quicker than dial-in; also "breaking out".
- Bulb(ed) – synonym for "redlight"
- Bump – (also called on the bump or in the bubble) a driver is ranked by qualifying order if they are ranked 15 or 16 in most skill classes they are placed "on the bump" if the next driver improves and gets a better score that driver is eliminated and has to do another run to requalify. If they mess up on all qualification days, do not make it to elimination, or lose the first or second round that driver is eliminated and "placed on the trailer" and sent home.
- Burnout – intentionally spinning and smoking the tires to build heat for better traction
- Christmas tree (or "tree") – device at the starting line containing signal lights, used to start a race in addition to showing starting violations
- DA – density altitude; a reference to qualities in the air.
- Dial-in (bracket racing) – a car's pre-estimated ET for a pass, used for handicapping the start
- Diaper – an absorbent containment blanket under the engine to prevent/reduce oil contact with the track, in the event of parts breakage
- Dope (Southern U.S.) – nitrous or propane injection in a diesel engine
- Doped – a car with a hidden nitrous system.
- Digger – dragster (as distinct from a bodied car or flopper)
- ET – Elapsed time. Time from a car leaving the starting line to crossing the finish line.
- First or worst – if both drivers commit a foul, the driver who commits the foul first loses, unless it is two separate fouls, where the loser is the driver who committed the worse foul (lane violation is worse than foul start, and failure to participate in a post-run inspection is worst).
- Flopper
  - commonly, Funny Car
  - any flip-top car Coined by dragster crews in the late 1960s to separate Funny Cars, which had fiberglass bodies with fenders, from dragsters.
- Fuel – shorthand for "top fuel", a mix of methanol and nitromethane ("pop", nitro)
- Fueler – any car running top fuel or in a top fuel class (most often, TFD or TF/FC)
- Grenade – an engine destroyed (the engine "grenaded") due to internal failure. Distinct from "popping a blower".
- Heads-up racing – a non-handicapped racing style where both drivers are started at the same time. Used in all professional ("pro") classes.
- Holeshot – gaining an advantage by a faster reaction time at the start. The other driver gets "holeshotted" or "left at the tree".
  - Holeshot win – a race won by a driver with a slower elapsed time but a faster reaction time.
- Hook[ed] up – good traction between tires and track resulting in increased acceleration and reduced slipping or smoking of tires.
- James Bond – when a driver's reaction time is seven thousandths of a second after the green light (.007). A "James Bond Red" is a reaction time of -.007 seconds (red light), which is disqualification unless the opponent commits a more serious violation.
- Kit – turbo or nitrous kit
- Lit the tires – lost traction, causing burning rubber
- Meth – methanol injection used in conjunction with gasoline (non-leaded pump) (Not to be confused with Methamphetamine)
- Mill – any internal combustion engine used in a drag car, or hot rod
- Nitro – nitromethane
- Nitrous – nitrous oxide system; the gas used in such a system
- No prep – a style of racing where the track has not been pre-treated to improve traction
- Overdrive – ratio between the revolutions of the supercharger drive to the revolutions of the engine, controlling amount of boost; see underdrive
- Oildown – when a car's engine or lubrication breaks during a run, leaving a streak of oil and other fluids on the track. This is punishable by fines, point penalties, and/or suspension.
- Pedalfest – race won by pedalling; or poor track conditions that necessitate pedalling
- Pedalling – working the throttle to maintain traction, or as a way to sandbag; "pedalled" it, had to "pedal" it
- Pro tree – style of starting a race where the timing lights flash all three yellow lights simultaneously, and after four tenths of a second, turn green. Compare to "Standard tree".
- Put on the trailer – lost (got "put on the trailer") or won (put the other driver on the trailer)
- Quad - when a drag racing event features four cars in a single race, each race is called a Quad.
- Quick 8 (Q8) – quickest eight cars in a defined race
- Rail – dragster (as distinct from bodied car or flopper). From the exposed frame rails of early cars.
- Redlight(ed) – jump(ed) the start, left before tree turned green. This is a loss unless the opponent commits a more serious foul (boundary lines or failed inspection).
- Red Cherry – red light
- Sandbagging – releasing the throttle or using the brakes at the end of the track during a bracket race after dialing a purposely slow time. Considered a dirty trick or tantamount to cheating in amateur classes.
- Scattershield – metal sheet protecting driver in case of transmission failure
- Slapper bar – traction bar
- Slicks – rear tires with no tread pattern and softer rubber compound, for increased traction
- Slingshot – early front-engined dragster, named for the driving position behind the rear wheels (erroneously attributed to launch speed).
- Small Tire – Class of car where rear tires are shorter than or equal to 28.5 in and or equal 12.5 in of tread. This type of racing usually assumes that the rear frame rails and suspension are not radically modified.
- Standard tree – style of starting a race where the timing lights flash in sequence five tenths of a second between each yellow light before turning green. Original starting method before introduction of pro tree.
- Struck the tires – (also called hazing the tires, smoking the tires, or smoking out) loss of traction, causing them to smoke
- Throw a belt – losing the drive belt connecting the engine's crankshaft to the supercharger
- Top end – finish line of strip; high part of engine's rev band.
- Traction bars – rear struts fixed to rear axle to keep rear axle from twisting, causing wheel hop and loss of traction; slapper bars.
- Trap(s) – the 20-metre (66 ft) speed trap near the finish line to measure speed & E.T.
- Trap speed – the speed measured by the 60 foot speed trap near the finish line, indicating maximum speed reached in a run.
- Tire shake – violent shaking of the car as the tires lose and regain traction in quick succession.
- Wheelie bars – rear struts fixed to rear axle, which protrude out to rear of car to help prevent car's front from raising too high or flipping over on launch.

== See also ==
- Australian National Drag Racing Association (ANDRA)
- Electric dragbike
- Electric dragster
- Fremont Dragstrip
- Jet dragster
- Land speed racing
- National Hot Rod Association (NHRA)
- Nostalgia drag racing
- Rocket dragster
- Santa Ana Drags
- Drag boat racing
