= White Zombie =

White Zombie may refer to:

- White Zombie (band), an American heavy metal band from the 20th-century
- White Zombie (film), a 1932 American horror film starring Bela Lugosi
- White Zombie, a 2016 album by Paul Roland
- White Zombie, a record-holding vehicle in the National Electric Drag Racing Association
- "White Zombie" (Baltzola Cave in Spain), the site of the world's first 8c (5.14b) onsight climb performed by Yuji Hirayama
