= Pro FWD =

Drag racing class

Pro FWD is a class in drag racing. The E.T. Bracket categories are no-electronics classes. Delay devices, throttle stops, air shifters, transbrakes, etc. or any device that transmits real-time, on-track data to the driver or any remote location are prohibited. All applicable NHRA rules apply based on elapsed time.

E.T. Bracket classes use a .5-second, full-countdown Tree.

== Engine ==
Restricted to one, 4-cylinder, overhead cam, production-based automotive engine. Maximum displacement 2.8 liter (170.75 cid). Engine swaps permitted; engine must be from same manufacturer as body (For example, Rover K-series engine into Austin Mini or Austin 1100 or Citroën Saxo engine into Citroën 2CV). Redundant power adders, such as a dual stage nitrous system or twin turbos, will be counted as one power adder. All engine block and cylinder head castings must be, or have been, available in a production car or truck from a recognized OEM assembly line with a minimum production run of 5,000 units. Transverse orientation may be converted to longitudinal orientation.

== Exhaust ==
Open exhaust permitted, except where prohibited by track rules.

== Fuel ==
Only methanol, NHRA-accepted ethanol, or NHRA-accepted racing gasoline permitted. All other fuels prohibited.

== Nitrous Oxide ==
Commercially available nitrous oxide permitted, including for supercharged and turbocharged engines. Nitrous bottle(s) in driver compartment must be equipped with a relief valve and vented outside of driver's compartment. Bottle(s) must be stamped with a DOT-1800-pound rating and permanently mounted (no hose clamps or tie wraps). Hoses from bottle(s) to solenoid must be high-pressure steel-braided or NHRA-accepted hoses.

== Forced Induction ==
All Applications: Restricted to a single turbocharger. All air entering the turbocharger must pass through the turbocharger inlet. Injection of any liquid, gas, or any other substance into the inlet or exhaust housing is prohibited. Turbocharger compressor wheel must be constructed of cast or billet aluminum. Exotic material wheels prohibited. Liquid intercoolers limited to water and/or ice ONLY.

Four-cylinder, single-turbo application: limited to maximum 88mm turbo, where the maximum compressor housing inducer diameter is 89.5mm (3.523 inches), measured at the point where the leading edge of the compressor wheel meets the housing. Compressor wheel inducer diameter not to exceed this value, and contours of wheel must not be "stepped, notched, or clipped"; i.e., the contours must be continuous features from the inducer to the wheel exducer. All air entering the turbocharger must pass through the turbocharger inlet. Injection of any liquid, gas, or any other substance into the inlet or exhaust housing is prohibited. Turbocharger compressor wheel must be constructed of cast or billet aluminum. Exotic material wheels prohibited.
