= Miller Wedge =

Overview
- Production: 1974
- Designer: Sammy Miller

Body and chassis
- Class: Top Fuel
- Body style: Rear-engined streamliner dragster

The Miller Wedge is a pioneering streamliner dragster.

Designed by dragster and funny car builder Sammy Miller in 1974, the car was allegedly a product of Miller's dislike of repeated funny car fires. It featured bicycle front wheels, a low-mounted, front-sloping rear wing, and a mid-mounted engine (placed further ahead of the rear axle than most similar dragsters). The body was a pronounced wedge shape, and covered the front of the slicks (unlike Wynns Stormer, which had a more conventional body and broad wedge fairings over the engine and exhaust, ahead of the rear tires). The exhaust pipes were also enclosed.

In theory, the wedge body offered an aerodynamic advantage, decreasing turbulent airflow over the rear wheels, as well as increasing downforce; in practise, the extra weight exceeded any advantage.

Miller ran the car for the 1974 season, but had "mixed results"; the car had no obvious edge over more conventional rear-engined dragsters.

== Sources ==
- Taylor, Thom. "Beauty Beyond the Twilight Zone" in Hot Rod, April 2017, pp.30-43.
