= Electric dragbike =

Motorcycle

An electric dragbike is an electric motorcycle used for drag racing.

Electric dragsters have come of age with new developments in battery and motor technology. Electric motors powered by lithium cells can deliver power-to-weight ratios similar to high performance gasoline engines. Drag races last around ten seconds so battery range is not an issue. A number of electric dragbikes and dragsters (cars) are competing with Top Fuel classes. Electric drag racing records are listed at NEDRA.

== Batteries ==
Electric dragbike tend to use lithium-ion or nickel-metal hydride cells due to their higher energy density which means they are less bulky to carry. In addition fewer cells are needed compared to a car as the "payload" of bike and rider is lighter. Typical weights: 80 kg (176 lb) rider, 200 kg (441 lb) bike excluding battery weight.

== See also ==
- Electric drag racing
- Team killacycle Killacycle electric Dragbike
