= Sammy Miller (engineer) =

American dragster and car maker (1945–2002)

- Born: Samuel Anthony Miller; April 15, 1945
- Died: October 29, 2002 (aged 57); Texas, U.S.
- Resting place: Gate of Heaven Cemetery and Mausoleum, East Hanover, New Jersey

Sammy Miller (nicknamed "Slam'n Sammy") (born Samuel Anthony Miller; April 15, 1945 – October 29, 2002) was a dragster and funny car builder in the 1970s and 1980s.

Miller was responsible for the "Miller Wedge" digger in 1974 and the rocket-powered Vanishing Point Vega FC in the 1980s.

The Wedge was allegedly a product of Miller's dislike of repeated funny car fires. It featured bicycle front wheels, a low-mounted, front-sloping rear wing, and a mid-mounted engine (placed further ahead of the rear axle than most similar dragsters).

Miller was killed in an accident on Tuesday 29 October 2002 whilst working in the Texas oilfields for his company Applied Force.

== Notes ==
Fastest quarter mile run ever. 3.58 sec 386mp Sammy Miller in Vanishing Point Rocket Car Santa Pod.

== Sources ==
- Taylor, Thom. "Beauty Beyond the Twilight Zone" in Hot Rod, April 2017, pp. 30–43.
