= Electric dragster =

An electric dragster is a drag racing vehicle which contains an electric propulsion system which is powered by batteries, fuel cells, supercapacitors (ultracapacitors), and sometimes they include a combustion engine to recharge their ESS (Energy Storage Systems).

Electric vehicles are becoming increasingly common because electric propulsion systems have recently been gaining recognition as a replacement for gasoline and diesel powered propulsion systems. They are being considered as replacements for gasoline and diesel powered vehicles for many reasons, including the high efficiency of electric motors, their reliability, as well as their torque curves which can be achieved without a costly transmission. The torque characteristics of electric motors are attractive because they produce large amounts of torque, and they start producing most of it at zero RPM.

One of the most significant problems which affect electric vehicle performance is the power density of their energy storage systems (energy density is a contributing factor too). Batteries and supercapacitors especially have relatively low energy densities compared to liquid fuels such as gasoline. Associated increases in mass can result in slower acceleration when compared to a gasoline-powered vehicle with similar power and weight characteristics. Increased mass can also increase braking distances and pitching. Offsetting these disadvantages is the benefit that batteries in an electric dragster can be evenly placed along the floor to keep the centre of mass low.

== See also ==
- Electric dragbike
