= Tucson Dragway =

Track for drag-racing

- Location: Pima County, near Tucson, Arizona
- Coordinates: 32°02′09″N 110°46′32″W
- Address: 12000 S Houghton Rd
- Opened: 2001
- Website: www.tucsondragway.com

Dragstrip
- Length: 0.250 mi (0.402 km)

The Tucson Dragway (also known as the Tucson Dragstrip) is a National Hot Rod Association sanctioned track for drag-racing located in Pima County, Arizona. It is located right next to the Tucson Speedway.

== History ==
The dragway was created in around 2000, to help stop the problem of street racing. For example, in January 2021, Tucson Police had arrested 48 people for an illegal street racing incident.

== COVID-19 effects ==
Due to the COVID-19 pandemic, the dragway was forced to close in March 2020. However, in February 2021, the dragway was allowed to host events but with a limited capacity. It fully re-opened in May, with safety standards.
