= National Electric Drag Racing Association =

The National Electric Drag Racing Association (NEDRA) is a Special Chapter of the Electric Auto Association and exists to increase public awareness of electric vehicle (EV) performance. NEDRA has been working to encourage competition and advances in electric vehicle technology since 1997. NEDRA achieves this by organizing and sanctioning safe, silent, and exciting electric vehicle drag racing events. The business is based in Houston, Texas.

== About ==
NEDRA was founded in 1997 by John Wayland and Roderick Wilde. The organization is a coalition of drag racing fans, electric drag racing vehicle owners and drivers, individuals interested in promoting the sport of EV drag racing, EV parts suppliers, EV manufacturers, and other environmentally concerned companies and individuals. Working as a group, NEDRA aims to put excitement into electric vehicle drag racing.

== Examples ==
Examples of NEDRA vehicles are:

- The Maniac Mazda, a Mazda RX-7 which can achieve 1/4-mile times of under 12 seconds.
- White Zombie, a converted Datsun 1200 sedan that can win against a Dodge Viper and has a best time of 10.25 seconds for the quarter mile, finishing at 126 mph.

== Classification and divisions ==
Division	Voltage
A3	349 V and above
A2	301–348 V
A	241–300 V
B	193–240 V
C	169–192 V
D	145–168 V
E	121–144 V
F	97–120 V
G	73–96 V
H	49–72 V
I	25–48 V
J	24 V and below

NEDRA vehicles are categorized by class and voltage.

The 16 classes are determined by the extent of the vehicle's modification. These comprise Street, Pro-Street, and Modified subclasses for both Production and Converted classes; Extreme Street, Funny Car, and Dragsters; four Motorcycle classes; Concept Vehicles; and two classes for educational projects.

The 14 voltage divisions range from "J" for 24 volts and below, to "A5" for 600 volts and above.

== NEDRA records ==
NEDRA maintains a list of fastest race times for both 1/4- and 1/8-mile ETs in the sanctioned classes on this page.

As of December 2017, the quickest vehicle in the 1/4 mile is the Rocket (motorcycle), with a 6.940 second ET and a trap speed of 201.37 mph set at Virginia Motorsports Park in May 2012. This motorcycle became the first electric vehicle to break 200 mph in the quarter mile. Don Garlits' Swamp Rat has the dragster record, with a 7.274 second ET and a trap speed of 185.6 mph set at Bradenton Motorsport Park in August 2014.

== Major events ==
- Electric Dragin'
- Wicked Watts
- Power of DC
- NEDRA Nationals (Woodburn)

== See also ==
- National Hot Rod Association
- Electric drag bike
- Electric motorsport
