= Porsche 911 =

Sports car produced by Porsche

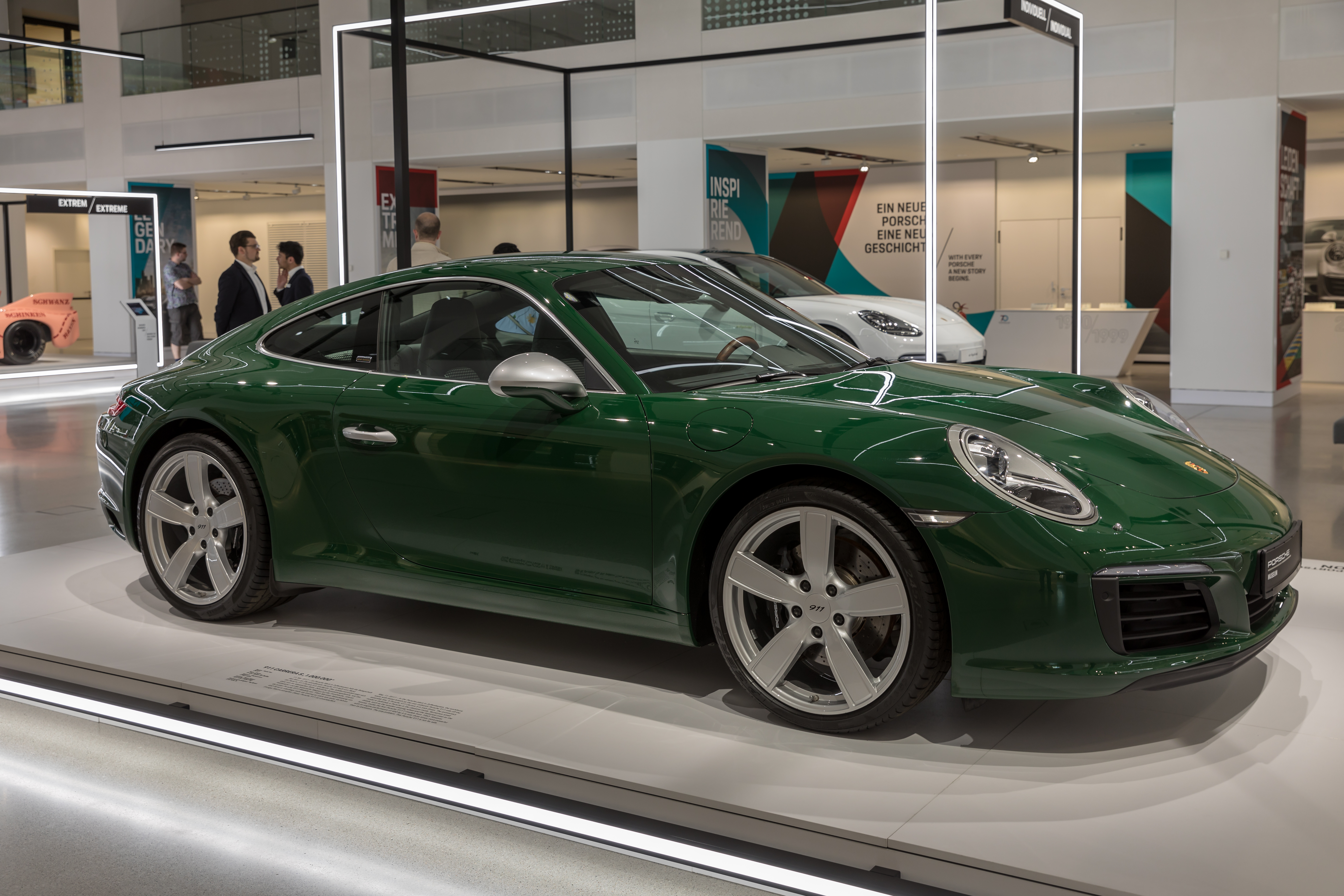
- The 1 millionth 911, which was produced in 2017, on display at Volkswagen Group Forum, Berlin, in Irish Green.

Overview
- Manufacturer: Porsche AG
- Production: September 1964 – present
- Assembly: Germany: Stuttgart, Baden-Württemberg
- Designer: Ferdinand Butzi Porsche (original design)

Body and chassis
- Class: Sports car/Grand tourer (S)
- Body style: 2-door, 2+2 or 2-seat coupé; 2-door 2+2 or 2-seat convertible; 2-door 2+2 targa top; 2-door 2-seat speedster
- Layout: Rear-engine, rear-wheel drive/all-wheel drive
- Related: Porsche 911 GT1; Porsche 911 GT2; Porsche 911 GT3; Porsche 912; Porsche 934; Porsche 935; Porsche 959; Porsche Boxster/Cayman; Ruf RGT; Ruf CTR; Ruf CTR2

Chronology
- Predecessor: Porsche 356

Logo.

The Porsche 911 model series (pronounced Nine Eleven or in German: Neunhundertelf, or colloquially Neunelfer) is a family of two-door, high performance rear-engine sports cars, introduced in September 1964 by Porsche of Stuttgart, Germany, and now in its eighth generation. All 911s have a rear-mounted flat-six engine, and usually 2+2 seating, except for special 2-seater variants. Originally, 911s had air-cooled engines, and torsion bar suspension, but the 911 has been continuously changed and improved across generations. Though the 911 core concept has remained largely unchanged, water-cooled engines were introduced with the 996 series in 1998, and front and rear suspension have been replaced by Porsche-specific MacPherson suspension in the front, and independent multi-link suspension in the rear.

The 911 has been raced extensively by private and factory teams, in a variety of classes. It is among the most successful competition cars. In the mid-1970s, the naturally aspirated 911 Carrera RSR won world championship races including Targa Florio and the 24 Hours of Daytona. The 911-derived 935 turbo also won the 24 Hours of Le Mans in 1979. Porsche won the World Championship for Makes in 1976, 1977, 1978, and 1979 with 911-derived models.

In a 1999 poll to determine the Car of the Century, the 911 ranked fifth — one of two in the top five that had remained continuously in production (the original Beetle remained in production until 2003). The one millionth example was manufactured in May 2017 and is in the company's permanent collection.

== Air-cooled engines (1964–1998) ==
=== 911, 911E, 911L, 911S, 911T ===
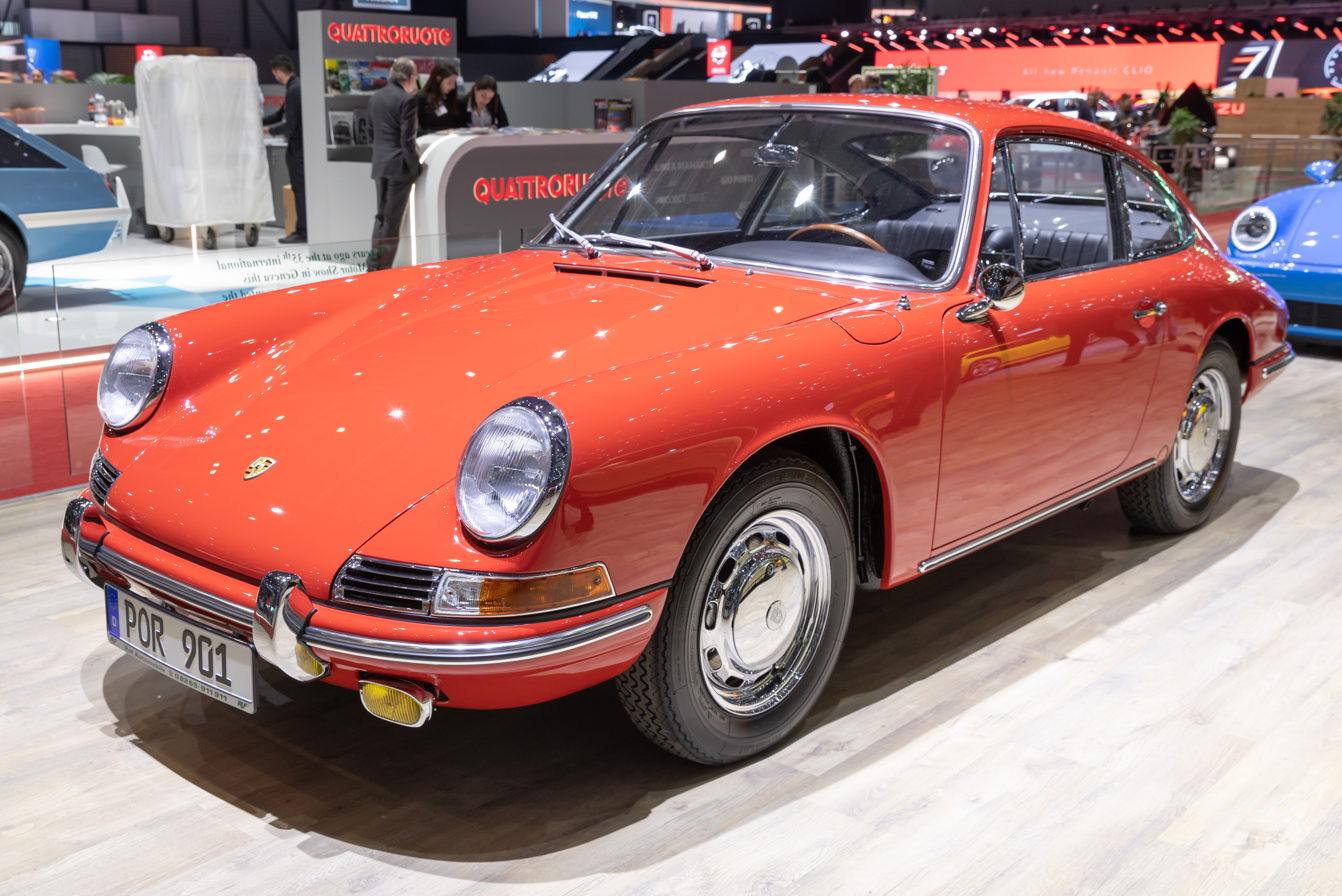
The original Porsche 901 on display at the 2019 Geneva Motor Show

The 911 traces its roots to sketches drawn by Ferdinand "Butzi" Porsche in 1959. The 911 was developed as a more powerful, larger, and more comfortable replacement for the 356, the company's first model, and was presented at the 1963 Frankfurt Motor Show. (German: Internationale Automobil-Ausstellung). The car was developed with the proof-of-concept twin-fan Type 745 flat-six engine, but the car presented at the auto show had a non-operational mockup of a single-fan engine, receiving a working Typ 901 engine in February 1964.

Originally marketed as the Porsche 901 (referring to its internal project number, 901), 82 examples carried the 901 nameplate before French automobile manufacturer Peugeot protested, claiming it held exclusive rights in France to car names formed by three numbers with a zero in the middle. Rather than selling the new model with a different name in France, Porsche marketed the model instead as '911'. Internally, the part numbers for the model carried the prefix 901 for years. Production began in September 1964, with the first 911s exported to the US in February 1965.

The first models of the 911 used a rear-mounted 130 PS (96 kW; 128 hp)^{[1]} Type 901/01 flat-6 engine, in the "boxer" configuration like the 356. The engine is air-cooled and displaces 1,991 cc (2.0 L) as compared to the 356's four-cylinder, 1,582 cc (1.6 L). As a 2+2 body style, rear seating was provisional. A four or five-speed "Type 901" manual transmission was available. The styling was largely penned by Ferdinand "Butzi" Porsche, son of Ferdinand "Ferry" Porsche. Butzi Porsche initially came up with the front and rear style on a prototype T7 body for the 356, based on a lengthened notchback 356B Karmann Hardtop (T5 body) with proper space for seating two rear passengers. Erwin Komenda, who led the development project on the T6 body, which replaced the T5 in 1962, was also instrumental in merging the T7 style with new engine, steering, transaxle and suspension.

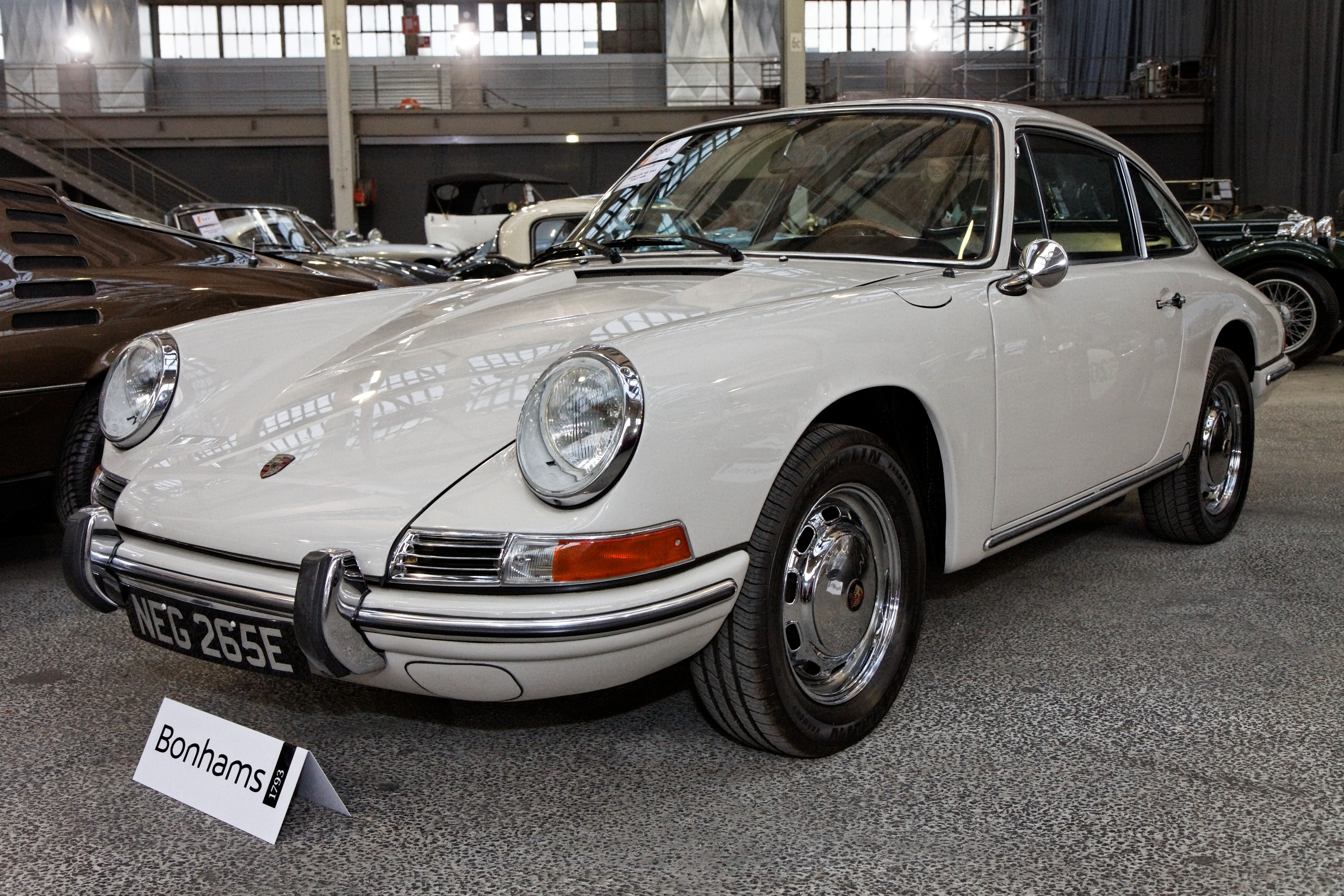
The 911-based 912, powered by a flat-4 engine (1967)

Production of the 356 ended in 1965, but there was still a market for a 4-cylinder car, particularly in the US. The 912, introduced in the same year, served as a direct replacement, offering the de-tuned version of the 356 SC's 4-cylinder, 1,582 cc (1.6 L), 90 PS (66 kW; 89 hp) boxer four Type 616/36 engine inside the 911 bodywork with a Type 901 four-speed manual transmission (a 5-speed manual transmission was optional).

In 1966, Porsche introduced the more powerful 911S, with its Type 901/02 engine having a power output of 160 PS (118 kW; 158 hp). Forged aluminium alloy wheels from Fuchsfelge, with a 5-spoke design, were offered for the first time. In motorsport at the same time, the engine was developed into the Type 901/20 and was installed in the mid-engine 904 and 906 with an increased power output of 210 PS (154 kW; 207 hp), as well as fuel injected Type 901/21 installed in later variants of the 906 and 910 with a power output of 220 PS (162 kW; 217 hp).

In August 1967, the A series went into production with dual brake circuits and widened (5.5J-15) wheels still fitted with Pirelli Cinturato tyres, and the previously standard gasoline-burning heater became optional. The Targa (meaning "plate" in Italian) version was introduced. The Targa had a stainless steel-clad roll bar, as automakers believed that proposed rollover safety requirements by the US National Highway Traffic Safety Administration (NHTSA) would make it difficult for fully open convertibles to meet regulations for sale in the US, an important market for the 911. The name "Targa" came from the Targa Florio sports car road race in Sicily, Italy in which Porsche had several victories until 1973. The last win in the subsequently discontinued event was scored with a 911 Carrera RS against prototypes entered by Ferrari and Alfa Romeo. The road-going Targa was equipped with a removable roof panel and a removable plastic rear window (although a fixed glass version was offered from 1968).

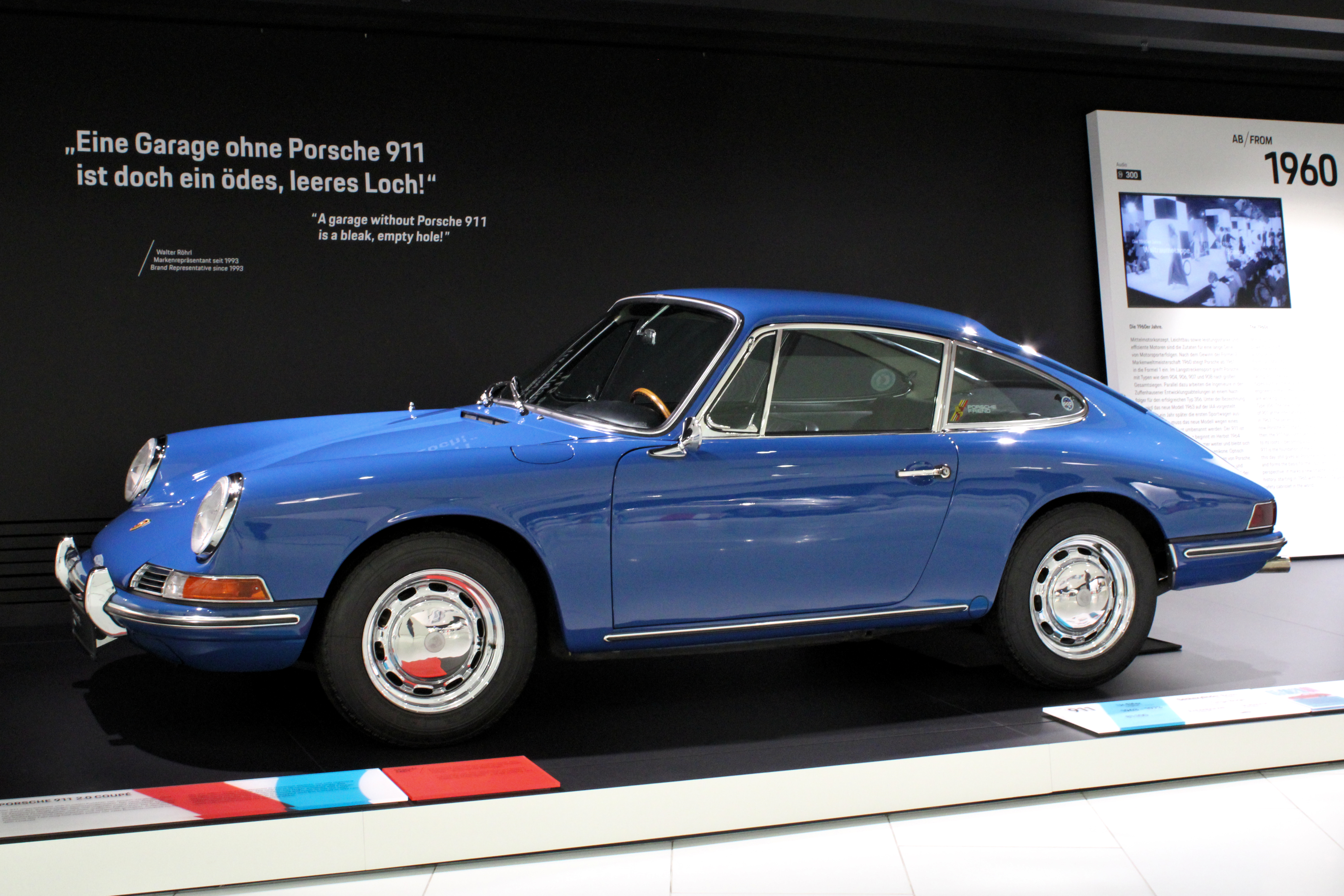
Porsche 911 2.0 Coupe (1964) at the Porsche Museum in Stuttgart

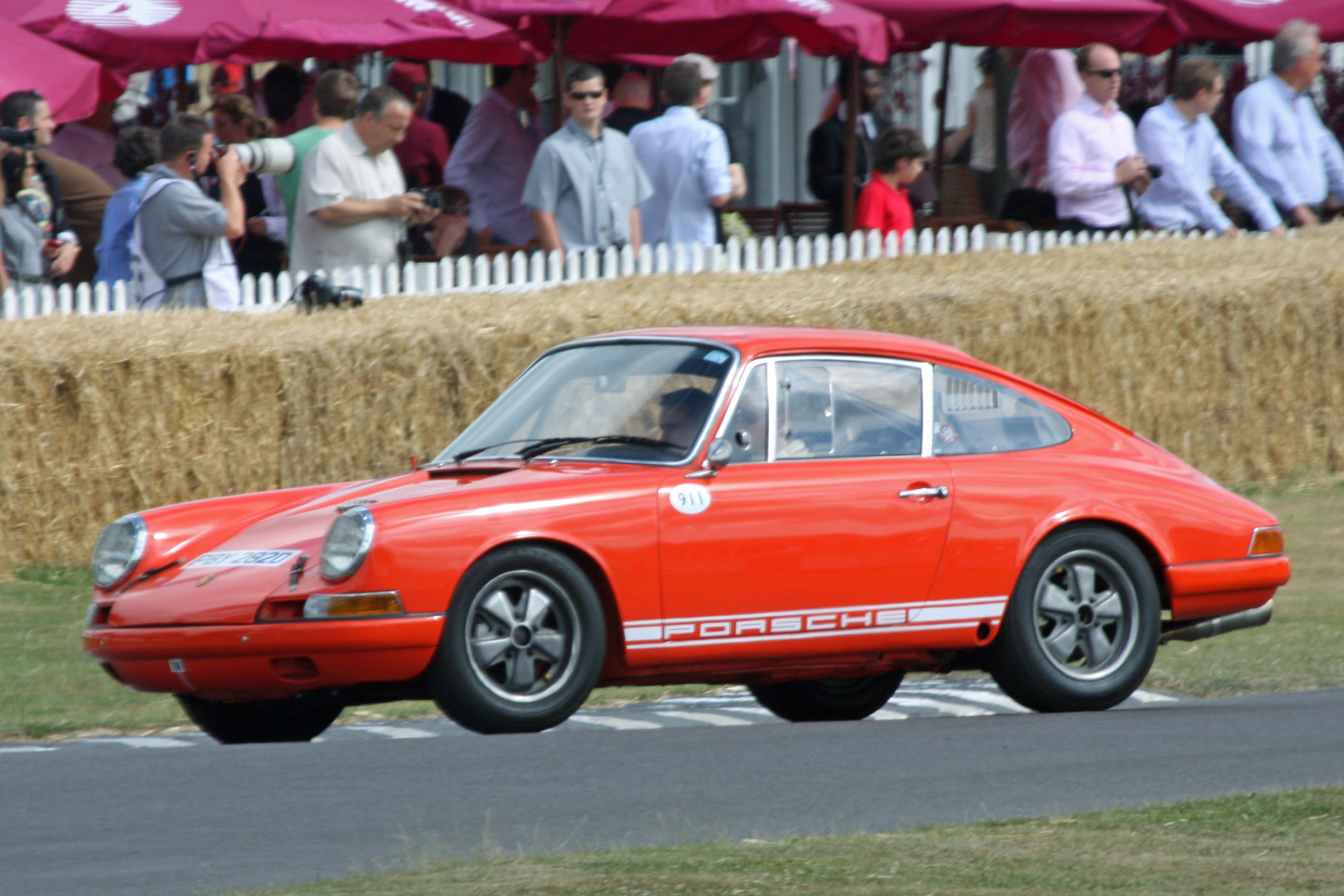
911 R (1967)

The 110 PS (81 kW; 110 hp) 911T was also launched in 1967 with Type 901/03 engine. The 130 PS (96 kW; 128 hp) model was renamed the 911L with Type 901/06 engine and ventilated front disc brakes. The brakes had been introduced on the previous 911S. The 911R with 901/22 engine had a limited production (20 in all), as this was a lightweight racing version with thin fiberglass reinforced plastic doors, a magnesium crankcase, twin overhead camshafts, and a power output of 210 PS (154 kW; 207 hp).

A clutchless semi-automatic Sportomatic model, composed of a torque converter, an automatic clutch, and the four-speed transmission was added in Autumn 1967. It was canceled after the 1980 model year partly because of the elimination of a forward gear to make it a three-speed.

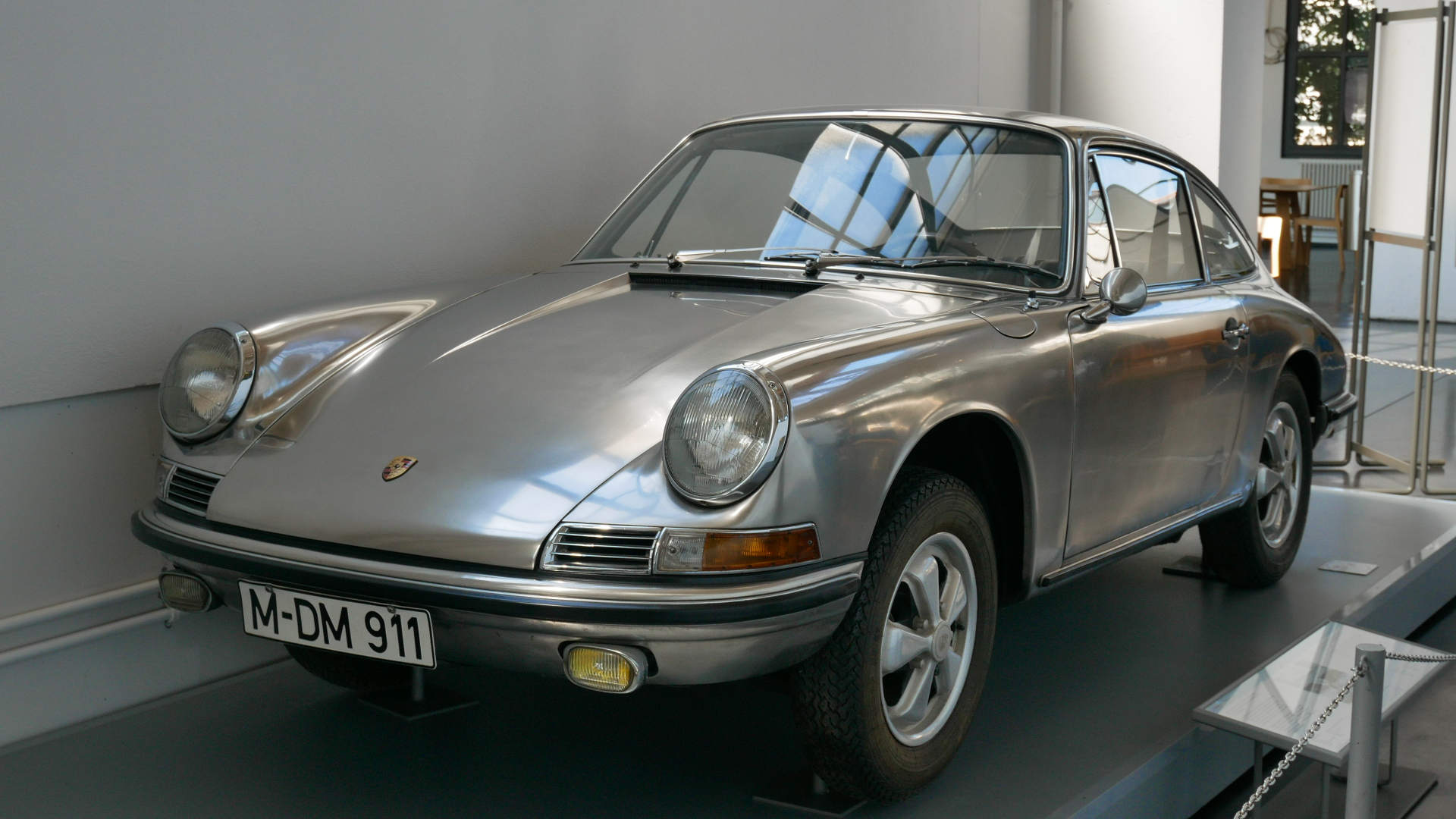
1967 Prototype Porsche 911 bodied in stainless steel at the Deutsches Museum.

The B series went into production in August 1968, replacing the 911L model with 911E with fuel injection. It remained in production until July 1969. The 911E gained wider tires on 6J-15 wheels.

The C series was introduced in August 1969 with an enlarged 2.2-litre engine (84 mm bore x 66 mm stroke). The wheelbase for all 911 and 912 models was increased from 2,211–2,268 mm (87.0–89.3 in), to help remedy the car's nervous handling at the limit. The overall length of the car did not change, but the rear wheels were relocated further back. Fuel injection arrived for the 911S (901/10 engine) and for a new middle model, 911E (901/09 engine).

The D series was produced from Aug. 1970 to July 1971. The 2.2-litre 911E (C and D series) had lower power output of the 911/01 engine (155 PS (114 kW; 153 hp) at 6,200 rpm) compared to the 911S's Type 911/02 (180 PS (132 kW; 178 hp) at 6,500 rpm), but 911E was quicker in acceleration up to 160 km/h (99 mph).

The E series for 1972–1973 model years (August 1971 to July 1972 production) consisted of the same models, but with a new, larger 2,341 cc (2.3 L) engine. This is known as the "2.4 L" engine, despite its displacement being closer to 2.3 litres. The 911E (Type 911/52 engine) and 911S (Type 911/53) used Bosch mechanical fuel injection (MFI) in all markets. For 1972 the 911T (Type 911/57) was carbureted, except in the US and some Asian markets where the 911T also came with (MFI) mechanical fuel injection (Type 911/51 engine) with power increase over European models (130 hp) to 140 hp commonly known as a 911T/E.

With power and torque increase, the 2.4-litre cars also got a newer, stronger transmission, identified by its Porsche type number 915. Derived from the transmission in the 908 race car, the 915 did away with the 901 transmission's "dog-leg" style first gear arrangement, opting for a traditional H pattern with first gear up to the left, second gear underneath first, etc. The E series had the unusual oil filler behind the right side door, with the dry sump oil tank relocated from behind the right rear wheel to the front of it in an attempt to move the centre of gravity slightly forward for better handling. An extra oil filler/inspection flap was located on the rear wing, for this reason it became known as an "Oil Klapper", "Ölklappe" or "Vierte Tür (4th door)".

The F series (August 1972 to July 1973 production) moved the oil tank back to the original behind-the-wheel location. This change was in response to complaints that gas-station attendants often filled gasoline into the oil tank. In January 1973, US 911Ts were switched to the new K-Jetronic CIS (Continuous Fuel Injection) system from Bosch on Type 911/91 engine.

911S models also gained a small spoiler under the front bumper to improve high-speed stability. The cars weighed 1,050 kg (2,310 lb). The 911 ST was produced in small numbers for racing (the production run for the ST lasted from 1970 to 1971). The cars were available with engines of either 1,987 cc (2.0 L) or 2,404 cc (2.4 L) displacement, having a power output of 270 PS (200 kW; 270 hp) at 8,000 rpm. Weight was down to 960 kg (2,120 lb). The cars had success at the Daytona 6 Hours, the Sebring 12 Hours, the 1000 km Nürburgring, and the Targa Florio.

=== 911 Carrera RS (1973 and 1974) ===
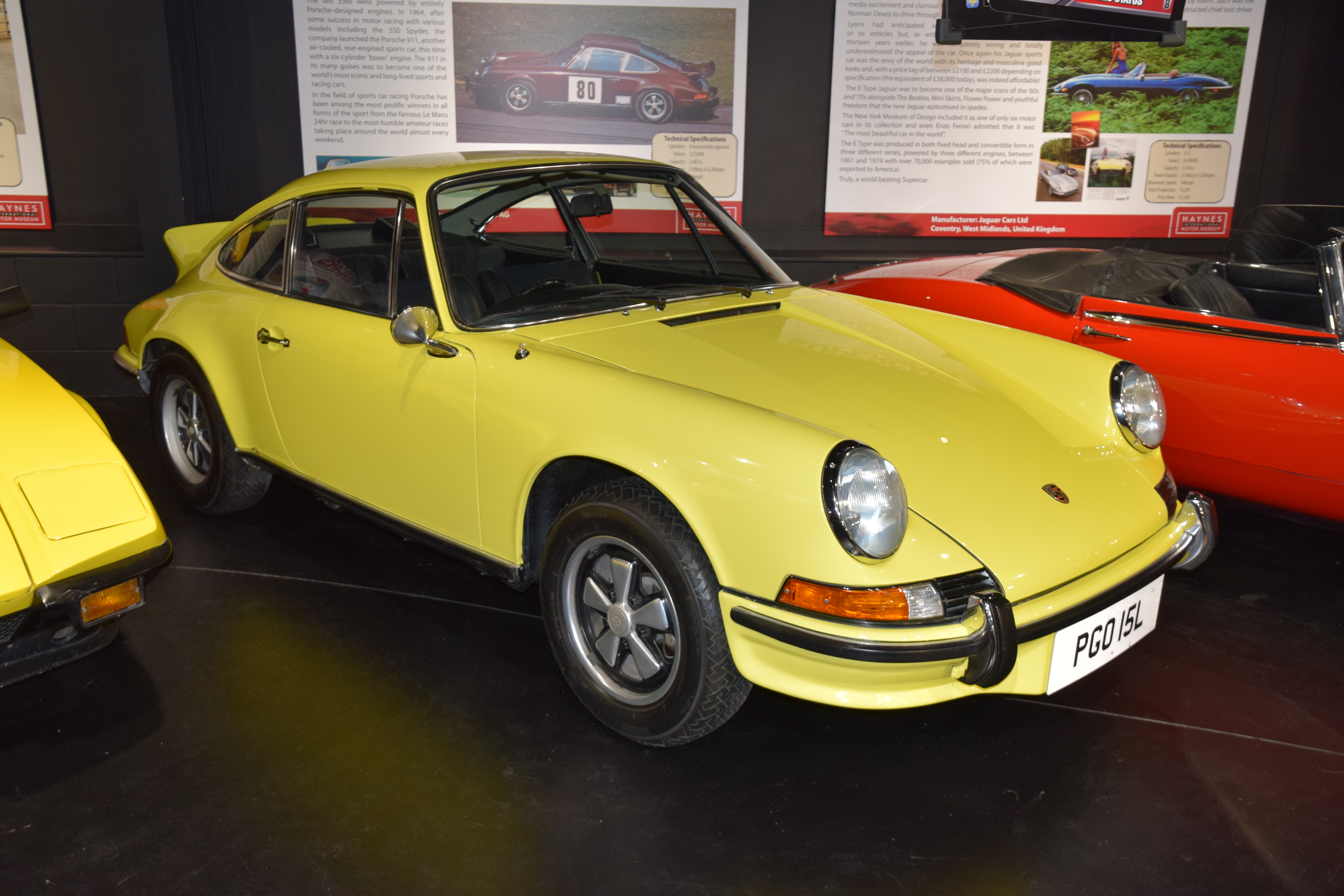
1973 Porsche 911 Carrera RS

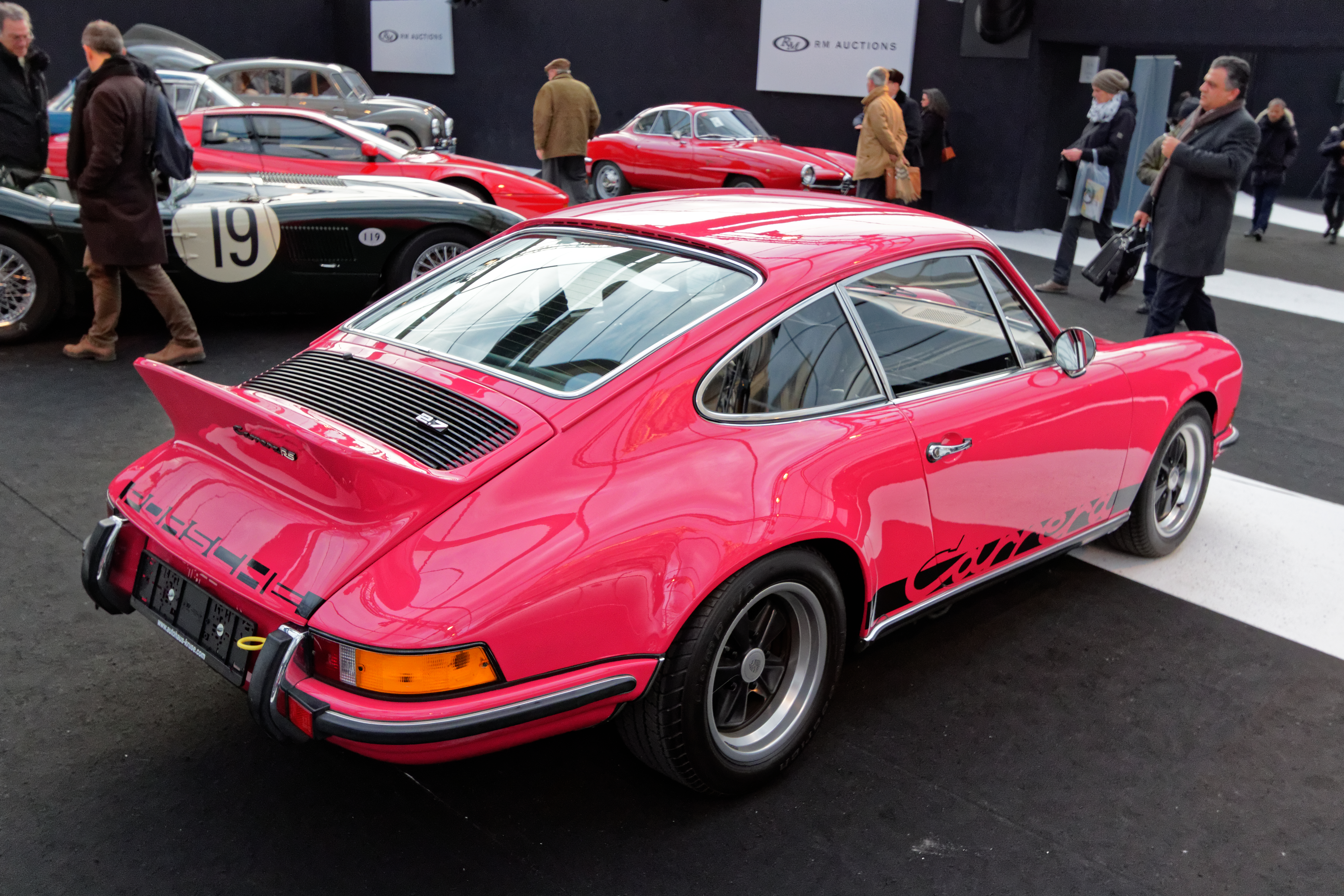
Porsche 911 Carrera RS 2.7 touring

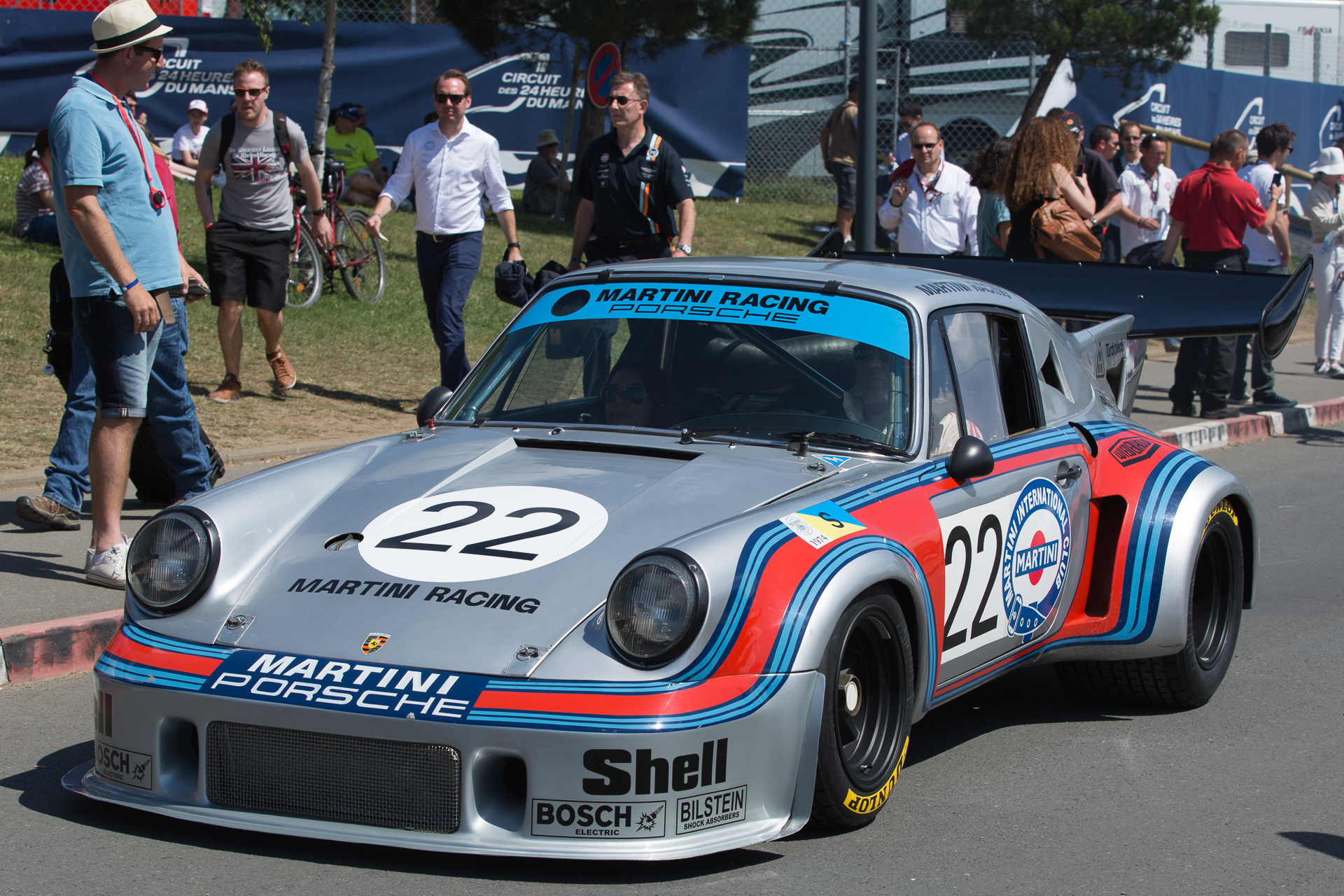
911 Carrera RSR Turbo, 1974 24 Hours of Le Mans

RS stands for Rennsport in German, meaning race sport. The Carrera name was reintroduced from the 356 Carrera which had itself been named after Porsche's class victories in the Carrera Panamericana races in Mexico in the 1950s. The RS was developed to meet motorsport homologation requirements. Compared to a standard 911S, the Carrera 2.7 RS had a larger engine (2,687 cc) developing 210 PS (154 kW; 207 hp) with Bosch (Kugelfischer) mechanical fuel injection, revised and stiffened suspension, a "ducktail" rear spoiler, larger brakes, wider rear wheels and rear fenders, to fit 185/70VR15 and 215/60VR15 tyres front and rear. In RS Touring form it weighed 1,075 kg (2,370 lb), in Sport Lightweight form it was about 100 kg (220 lb) lighter, the saving coming from thin gauge steel used for parts of the body shell and also the use of thinner glass. In total, 1,580 units were made, and qualified for the FIA Group 4 class. 49 Carrera RSR cars were built with 2,808 cc (2.8 L) engines rated at 300 PS (221 kW; 296 hp).

For the 1974 IROC Championship (which started in December 1973), 1973 Carrera RSR models were fitted with the 3.0 engine and a flat "whale tail" in place of the ducktail spoiler along with wide body panels and large tyres.

In 1974, Porsche developed the Carrera RS 3.0 with mechanical fuel injection rated at 230 PS (169 kW; 227 hp). Its price was almost twice that of the 2.7 RS, but it offered racing capability. The chassis was largely similar to that of the 1973 Carrera RSR and the braking system was from the 917 racing car. The use of thinner metal plate panels and a minimalist interior enabled its weight to be reduced to around 900 kg (2,000 lb).

The Carrera RSR 3.0 was sold to racing teams and scored wins in several major sports car races of the mid-1970s. Also, a prototype Carrera RSR Turbo (with 2.1-litre engine due to a 1.4x equivalency formula) came second at the 1974 24 Hours of Le Mans and won several major races, a significant event in that its engine would form the basis of many future Porsche attempts in sports car racing.

=== 911 and 911S 2.7 (1973–1977) ===
Although all 911s built between 1974 and 1989 are commonly referred to as 'G-series', factually the G-series was only produced for the 1974 model year. It was followed by the H, J, K, and so on.

Model year 1974 (G Series. Aug. 1973 to July 1974 production)

Model year 1975 (H Series. Aug. 1974 to July 1975 production)

Model year 1976 (I Series. Aug. 1975 to July 1976 production)

Model year 1977 (K Series. Aug. 1976 to July 1977 production)

The 1974 model year brought many significant changes to the 911 to meet legislative requirements around the world for both impact safety and emissions. First, the engine size was increased to 2,687 cc achieving higher torque. Second, new impact bumpers conformed with low-speed protection requirements of US regulations. Thirdly, the use of K-Jetronic CIS Bosch fuel injection in two of the three models in the line up— the 911 and 911S models, retaining the narrow rear arches of the old 2.4, now had a 2.7-litre engine rated at 150 PS (110 kW; 148 hp) and 175 PS (129 kW; 173 hp), respectively. The standard 911 version received an increase to 165 PS (121 kW; 163 hp) for Model Year 1976, which meant that starting from MY 1976, there was only a difference in power of 10 hp between the 911 and the 911S. The engine remained a K-Jetronic 2.7-litre. The 911S 2.7 engine was rated during the entire lifespan at 175 PS (129 kW; 173 hp).

=== Carrera 2.7 MFI and CIS (1974–1976) ===
The Carrera 2.7 model built for all markets, except for the United States, used the 210 PS (154 kW; 207 hp) RS 911/83 engine with Bosch mechanical fuel injection pump from the 1973 Carrera RS. These Carrera 2.7 MFI models were built from 1974 until 1976 and were mechanically identical to the 1973 Carrera RS. The Carrera 2.7 model produced for the North American markets, often referred to as the Carrera 2.7 CIS, was powered by the same 2.7-litre engine as the 911S which produced 175 PS (129 kW; 173 hp). The initial Carrera 2.7 models had the same welded-on rear RS flares, before switching to the SC stamped style rear flares during the middle of the 1974 production year. The Carrera 2.7 coupés weighed in at 1,075 kg (2,370 lb), the same weight as the 1973 Carrera RS Touring.

For the 1974 model year, the Carrera 2.7 was available with the "ducktail" rear spoiler first introduced with the 1973 Carrera RS. In the North American markets, the ducktail was standard equipment for the Carrera. All other markets the ducktail was optional, except for the home German market where the ducktail had been outlawed by the TÜV road homologation department. This led to the introduction of the whale tail rear spoiler, available as an option on the 1974–75 Carrera 2.7 models, as well as the newly introduced 930 Turbo.

The Carrera 2.7 was replaced by the Carrera 3.0 for the 1976 model year, except for a special run of 113 1976 Carrera 2.7 MFI coupés were built for the German market featuring the 911/83 RS engine, with an additional 20 narrow-bodied 1976 Carrera MFI 2.7 Targas being supplied to the Belgian Gendarmerie. The 1976 Carrera 2.7 MFI Sondermodells were the last mechanically fuel injected 911 produced by Porsche and still featured the 1973 RS engine.

=== 912E (1976) ===
For the 1976 model year, the 912E was produced for the U.S. market. This was a 4-cylinder version of the 911 in the same manner as the 912 that had last been produced in 1969. It used the I-series chassis powered by the Volkswagen 2.0 engine also used in the Porsche 914 for 1973 through 1975 model years. 2,099 units were produced. The 912E was replaced by the front-engine Porsche 924 for the 1977 model year.

=== Carrera 3.0 (1976–1977) ===
For the 1976 model year, Porsche introduced the Carrera 3.0 with wide rear flares, optional whaletail, and a variety of other luxury options. It was available in all markets except North America. The Carrera 3.0 was fitted with a variation of the 930 Turbo's 2994 cc engine (minus the turbocharger). The engine (dubbed the 930/02) featured K-Jetronic CIS. It developed 200 PS (147 kW; 197 hp) in contrast to the older Carrera 2.7 MFI model's 210 PS (154 kW; 207 hp). The crankcase and gearbox housing were made of aluminium rather than magnesium for improved reliability. Magnesium cases were reviled for thermal expansion/contraction issues as engines grew in displacement and heat generation also increased.

The new engine, which featured bigger intake and exhaust valves, produced greater torque allowing the Carrera 3.0 to achieve the same performance as the previous Carrera 2.7, 0–100 km/h (0–62 mph) in 6.1 seconds and 0–200 km/h (0–124 mph) in 27 seconds. Both versions boasted a top speed of approximately 236 km/h (147 mph).

Weight increased marginally by 45 kg (99 lb) to 1,120 kg (2,469 lb).

The 911 Carrera 3.0 was produced in both targa (1,125 examples produced) and coupé (2,566) versions. The Carrera 3.0 was available with a manual gearbox (type 915) with 4 or 5 speeds as well as 3-speed automatic transmission (called the Sportomatic). Production totals were 3,691 manual cars and 58 Sportomatic cars.

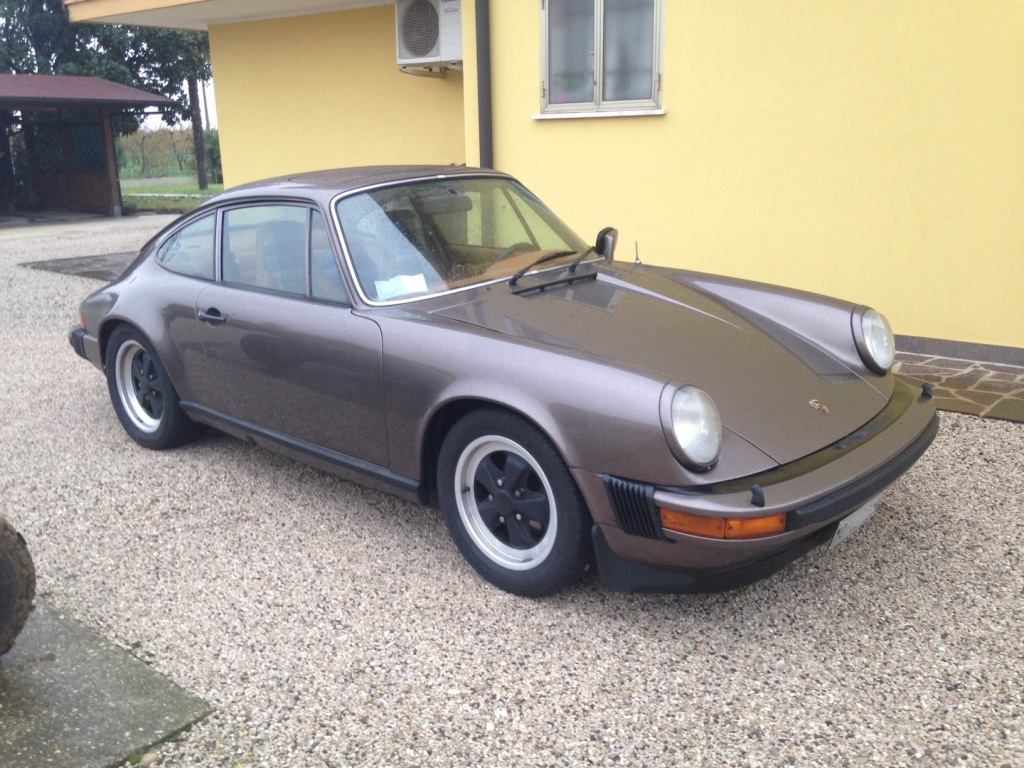
Porsche 911 Carrera 3.0

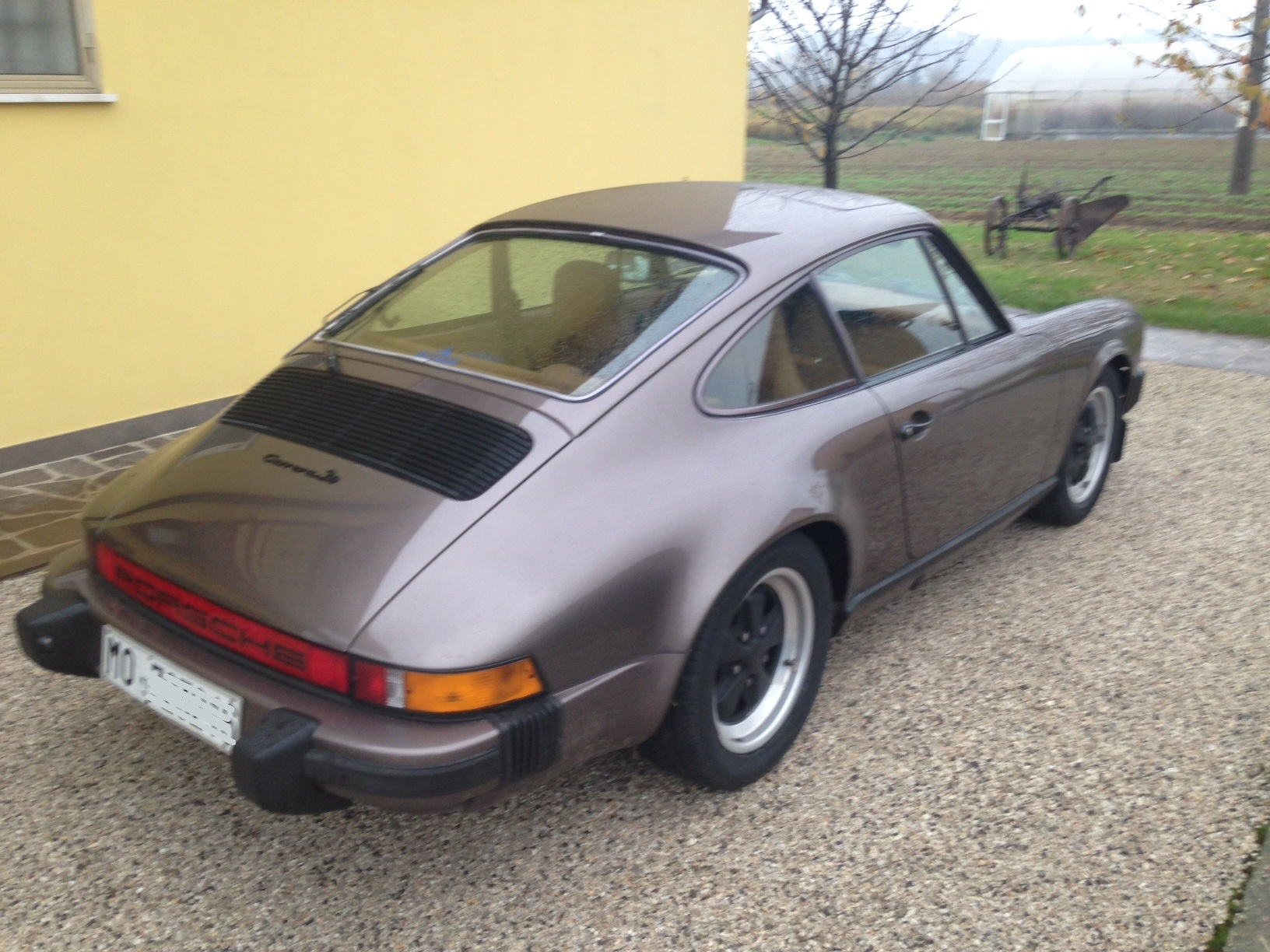
Porsche 911 Carrera 3.0

=== 930 Turbo (1975–1989) ===
==== 3.0-litre ====
For the 1975 model year, Porsche introduced the first production turbocharged 911. Although called the 930 Turbo (930 being its internal type number) in Europe, it was marketed as the 930 Turbo Carrera in North America. The body shape incorporated wide wheel-arches to accommodate the wide 205/50R15 & 225/50R15 Pirelli P7 tyres, and a large rear spoiler often known as a "whale tail" on the early cars (modified from the original 1974 IROC design). They were initially fitted with a 3.0-litre engine producing 260 PS (191 kW; 256 hp), and a four-speed manual transmission.

Production of the first 400 units qualified the 930 for FIA Group 4 competition. With the racing version called the Porsche 934 of 1976 participating at the 24 Hours of Le Mans and other races including battles with the BMW 3.0 CSL "Batmobile". The FIA Group 5 version called Porsche 935 evolved from the 934. Fitted with a slope nose or "slant nose", the 500+ PS car was campaigned in 1976 by the factory, winning the world championship title. Private teams went on to win many races, like Le Mans in 1979, and continued to compete successfully with the car well into the 1980s until the FIA and IMSA rules were changed.

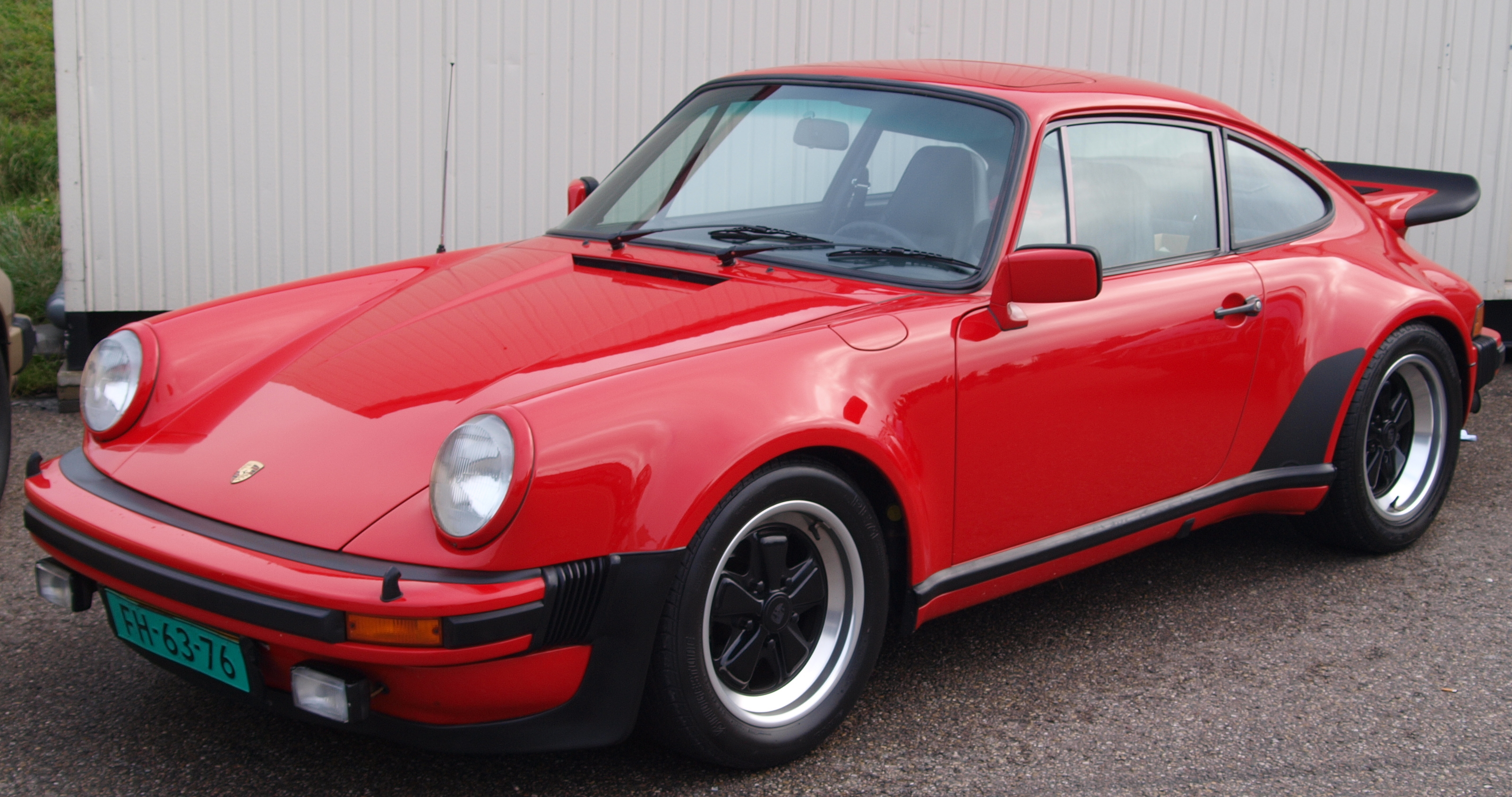
Porsche 911 Turbo (930)

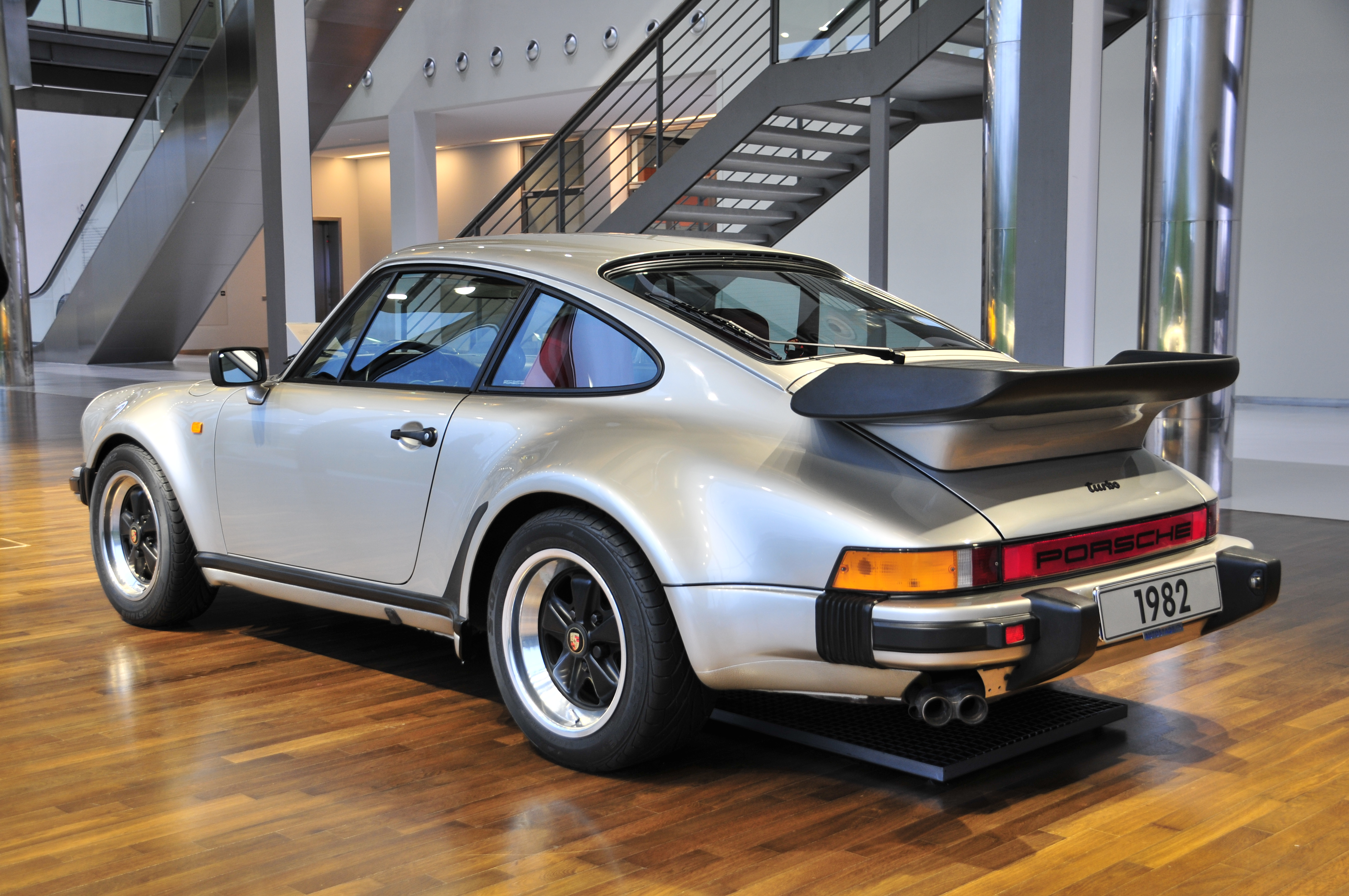
Porsche 930 3.3-litre, distinguished by its raised "tea tray" rear wing

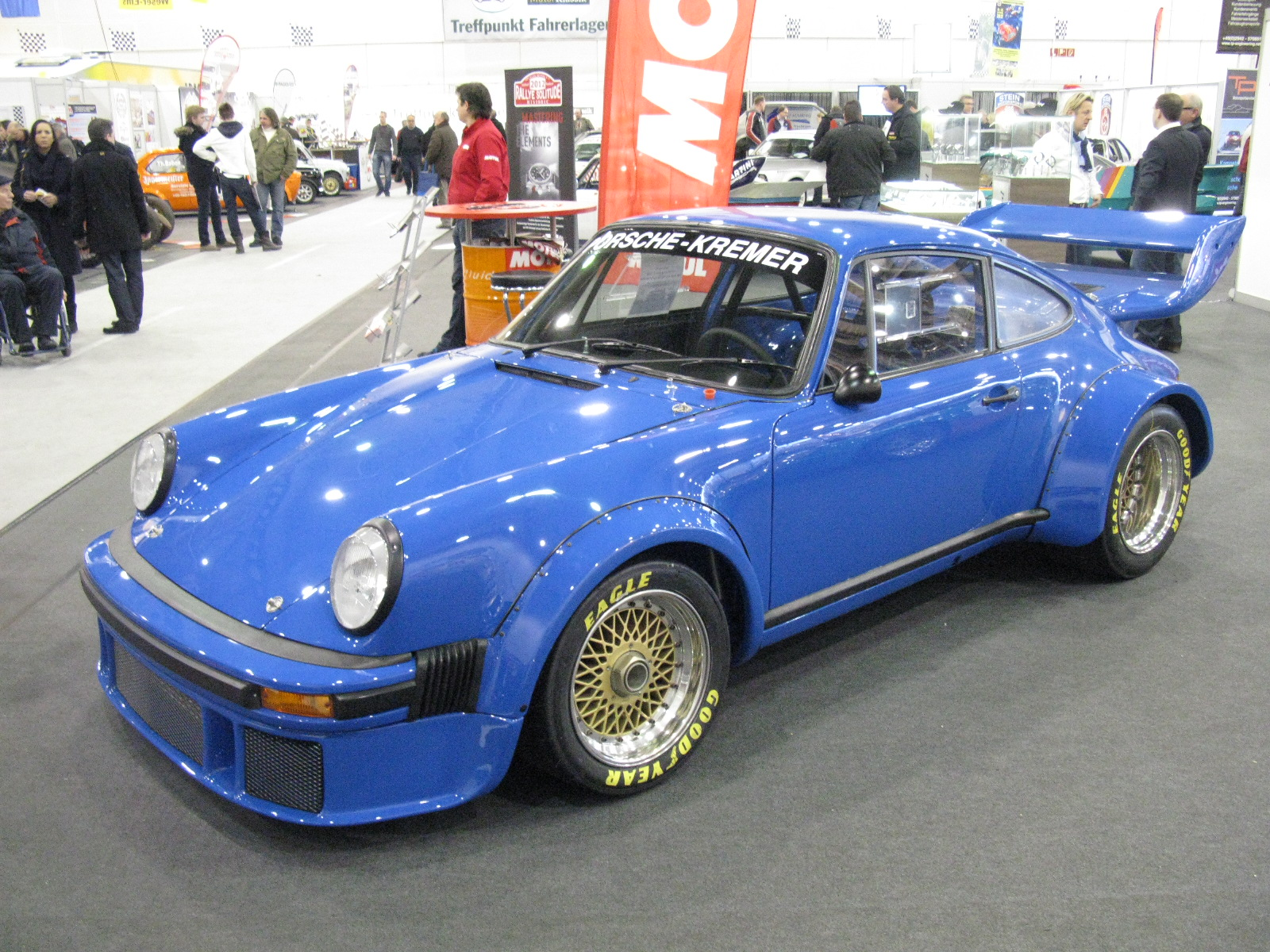
The Porsche 934, one of the first racing versions of the 930 Turbo

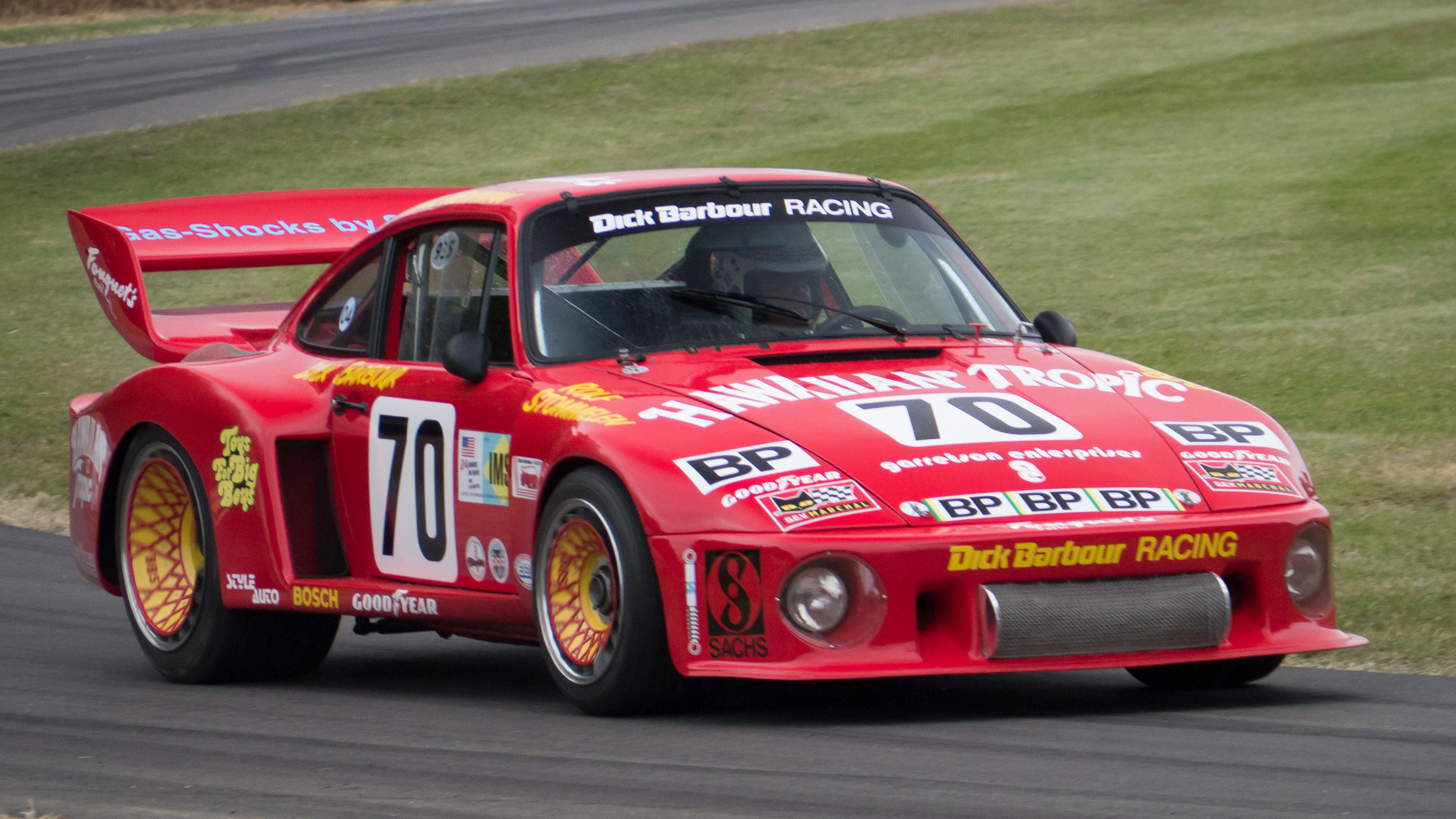
The Porsche 935 known for its signature "slant nose" front

==== 3.3-litre ====
For the 1978 model year, Porsche revised the 930 with a larger 3.3-litre turbocharged engine with intercooler rated at 300 PS (221 kW; 296 hp). To fit the intercooler a newly designed "tea-tray" tail spoiler replaced the earlier whale tail spoiler. Porsche dropped the "Carrera" nomenclature for the North American markets and the car was simply called the Porsche 911 Turbo worldwide. The larger engine helped reduce some of the turbo lag inherent in the earlier models.

In 1989, a 5-speed manual transmission became available for the 930. The 930 was replaced in 1990 with the 964 turbo featuring the same 3.3-litre engine. There have been turbocharged variants of each subsequent generation of 911 since then.

=== 911SC (1978–1983) ===
In 1978, Porsche introduced the new version of the 911, called the '911SC'. Porsche reintroduced the SC designation for the first time since the 356SC (as distinguished from the race engined 356 Carrera). There was no Carrera version of the 911SC. According to modern-day Porsche literature and websites (there is no period reference to SC meaning anything) the "SC" stands for "Super Carrera". It featured a 3.0-litre aluminium engine with Bosch K-Jetronic fuel injection and a 5-speed 915 transmission. Originally power output was 180 PS (132 kW; 178 hp), later 191 PS (140 kW; 188 hp), and then in 1981 it was increased to 204 PS (150 kW; 201 hp). The move to an aluminium engine was to regain case reliability, something missing for many years when using magnesium. In 1981 a Cabriolet concept car was introduced at the Frankfurt Motor Show. The convertible show car also featured four-wheel drive, but this was dropped in the production version. The first 911 Cabriolet debuted in late 1982, as a 1983 model. This was Porsche's first cabriolet since the 356 of the mid-1960s. A total of 4,214 were sold in its introductory year, despite its premium price relative to the semi-open targa. Cabriolet versions of the 911 have been offered ever since.

In 1979, Porsche was under the leadership of Ernst Fuhrmann. Fuhrmann had become a strong proponent for replacing the 911 – by then a design that had been on the market for a decade and a half – with their then-still relatively new 928, which had previously been planned to become the company's flagship model and their stake in the luxury GT market space. However several key developments were to change this. During the following fiscal years of 1980/81, Porsche experienced its first-ever annual financial losses as their front-engine models 924 and 928 were finding slow acceptance amid a sceptical customer base worldwide, but particularly painful in North America and specifically the United States which was then Porsche's most important and critical market. Customers that had been loyal to Porsche's traditional rear-engine format, such as the 356 and 911 models, were not flocking to showrooms to buy much, if any, of the newer designs. Conversely sales of the 911 remained strong and profitable during this same time frame, where the sales/strategy disconnect was significant enough such that the Porsche board chose to remove Fuhrmann to bring onboard in a new CEO, who in turn would subsequently revise the company's product strategy to give a second (and now seemingly permanent life) to the 911. In all, 911SC sales would total 58,914 cars during its production run across all variants.

Peter W. Schutz (CEO Porsche AG from 1981–1987) wrote:

The decision to keep the 911 in the product line occurred one afternoon in the office of Dr. Helmuth Bott, the Porsche operating board member responsible for all engineering and development. I noticed a chart on the wall of Professor Bott's office. It depicted the ongoing development schedules for the three primary Porsche product lines: 944, 928 and 911. Two of them stretched far into the future, but the 911 program stopped at the end of 1981. I remember rising from my chair, walking over to the chart, taking a black marker pen, and extending the 911 program bar clean off the chart. I am sure I heard a silent cheer from Professor Bott, and I knew I had done the right thing. The Porsche 911, the company icon, had been saved, and I believe the company was saved with it.

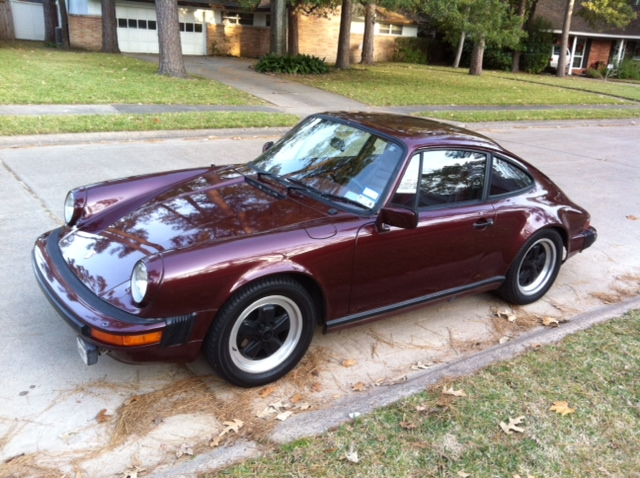
1983 Porsche 911 SC, the last production year of the SC

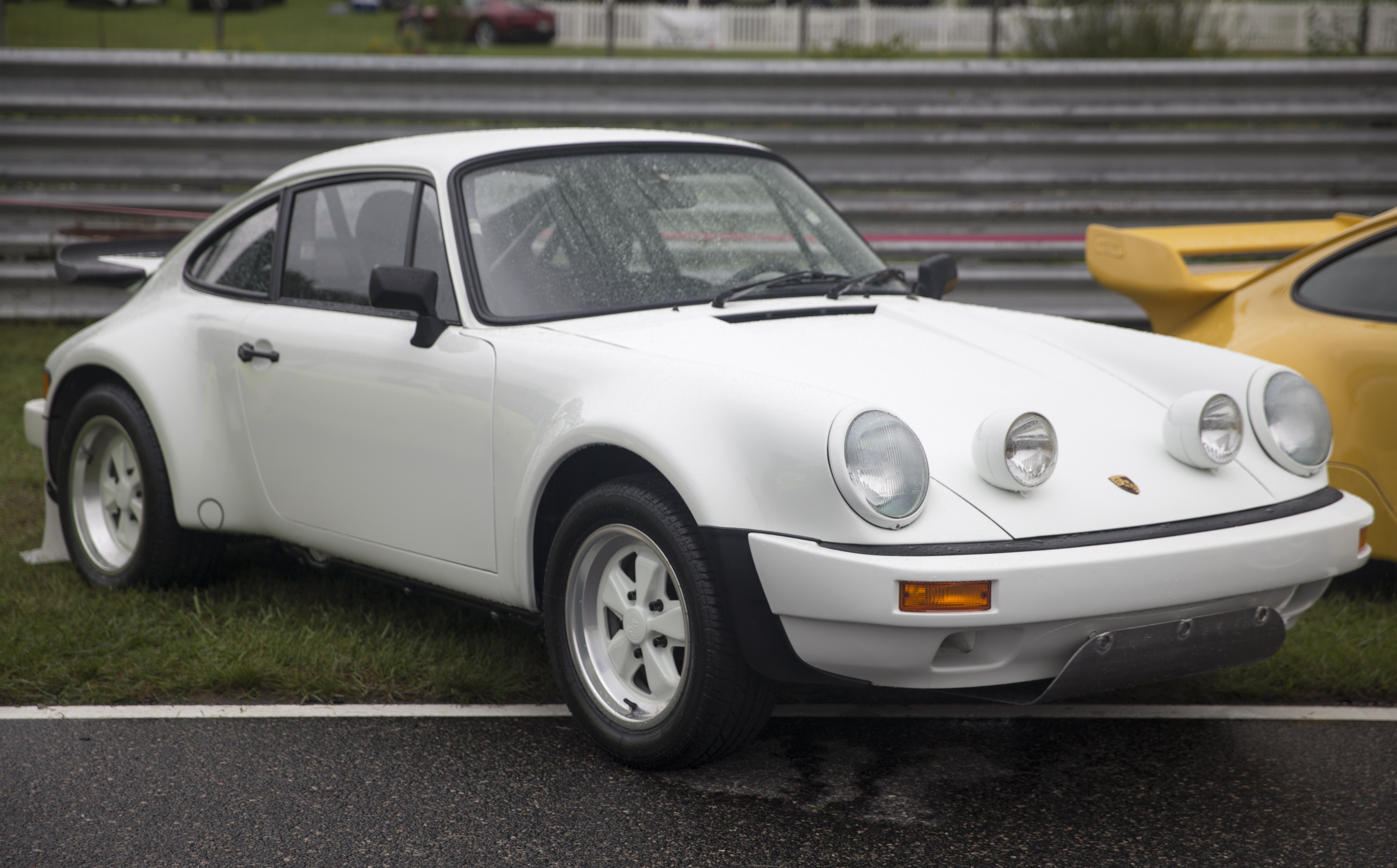
1984 Porsche 911 SC/RS

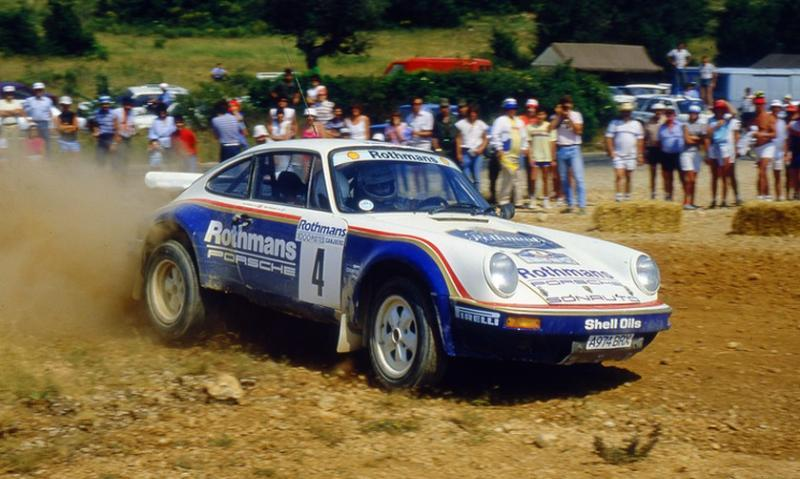
Henri Toivonen at rallye des 1000 pistes in 1984 on a Porsche 911 SC/RS

=== Carrera 3.2 (1984–1989) ===
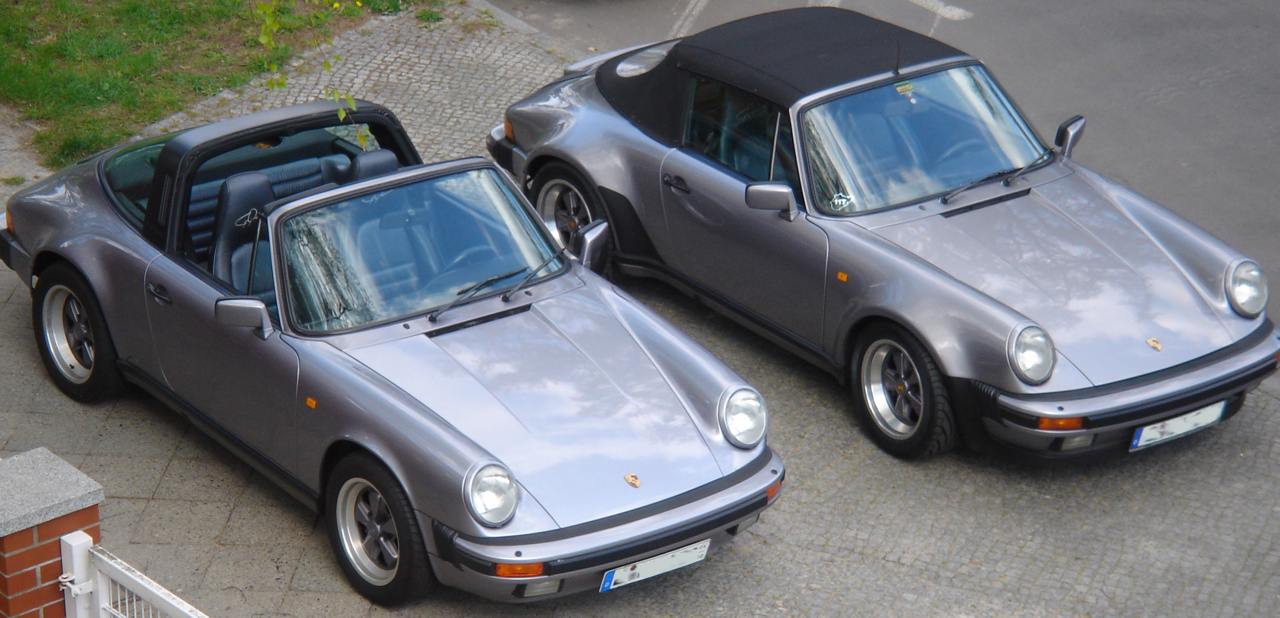
1988 Porsche 911 Commemorative Edition's Carrera "Turbo-Look" Cabriolet and "Carrera Targa"

The replacement for the SC series came in 1984 as the 911 3.2 Carrera, reviving the Carrera name for the first time since 1977. This was the last iteration in the original 911 series, with all subsequent models featuring new body styling and new brake, electronic, and suspension technologies.

A new higher-displacement engine, a 3.2-litre horizontally opposed flat 6-cylinder unit, was utilized. At the time Porsche claimed it was 80% new. The new swept volume of 3,164 cc was achieved using the 95 mm (3.7 in) bore (from the previous SC model) combined with the 1978 Turbo 3.3 crankshaft's 74.4 mm (2.9 in) stroke. In addition, higher domed pistons increased the compression ratio from 9.8 to 10.3:1 (9.5:1 for the US market). New inlet manifold and exhaust systems were fitted. The 915 transmission was carried over from the SC series for the first three model years. In 1987, the Carrera got a new five-speed gearbox sourced from Getrag, model number G50 with proven BorgWarner synchronizers. This slightly heavier version also featured a hydraulically operated clutch.

With the new engine, power was increased to 207 hp (154 kW; 210 PS; 207 hp) at 5,900 rpm for North American-delivered cars and to 237 PS (174 kW; 237 PS; 234 hp) at the same engine speed for most other markets. This version of the 911 accelerated 0–97 km/h (0–60 mph) in 5.4 seconds and had a top speed of 240 km/h (150 mph) as measured by Autocar. Factory figures were more modest: 0–60 mph (97 km/h) time of 6.3 seconds for the US version and 6.1 seconds for cars outside the American market.

The brake discs were increased in size to aid in more effective heat dissipation and improved oil-fed chain tensioners were fitted to the engine. To improve oil cooling, a finned cooler replaced the serpentine lines in the front passenger fender well. This was further improved in 1987, with the addition of a thermostatically controlled fan.

Driving refinement and motor reliability were improved with an upgrade of the fuel and ignition control components to an L-Jetronic with Bosch Motronics 2 DME (Digital Motor Electronics system). An improvement in fuel efficiency was due to the DME providing a petrol cut-off on the overrun. Changes in the fuel map and chip programming from October 1986 further improved the power to 162 kW (220 PS; 217 hp) at 5,900 rpm for North American delivered cars as well as for other markets mandating low emissions, like Germany.

Three basic models were available – coupé, targa and cabriolet. The Carrera is almost indistinguishable from the SC with the external clue being the front fog lights that were integrated into the front valance. Only cosmetic changes were made during the production of the Carrera, with a redesigned dashboard featuring larger air conditioning vents appearing in 1986.

In 1984, Porsche also introduced the M491 option. Officially called the Supersport in the UK, it was commonly known as the "Turbo-Look". It was a style that resembled the 930 Turbo with wide wheel arches and the distinctive "tea tray" tail. It featured the stiffer suspension shared with the Turbo and the superior Turbo braking system as well as the wider Turbo wheels. Sales of the Turbo-Look were high for its first two years in the United States because the desirable 930 was not available. 3,663 were sold until 1989. The Turbo-Look, received official title in the sales lists, as the 930 Chassis option starting in model year 1984. The order was now possible without the special wish department (as previously). At first, only available for the Coupé, some cabriolets were still ordered with Turbo-Look items without having option code M491 in the internal data sheets (cardex). For these cars the "Sonderwunsch" dept. was once more responsible. From model year 1985 the Turbo-Look option could be ordered on all three models; Coupé, Cabriolet and Targa produced together with the narrow body on the same production line.

The Turbo-Look option package contained: Front fenders of the 930 Turbo; which, were attached the same way as the Turbo, first by welding flares to the narrow fender, then from model year 1986 a new, widened fender as a one piece stamped steel part was developed. Side rear 930 widened fenders at the back; which, was attached the same way as the Turbo, first by welding flares to the narrow body, then from model year 1986 a new, widened quarter panel as one piece stamped steel part was manufactured. Porsche service information reads: "The visible from inside weld seam is omitted. The drawing part is now manufactured in one piece" The 930 front apron with Black rubber elastic spoiler with integrated front driving lights. The 930 Turbo rear wing with the black rubber elastic lip of the Porsche 930 3.3 Intercooled model. One could cancel the front spoiler and back spoiler - first without a change in price; however, later the package price decreased by about DM 2,000. Such vehicles were documented, in addition, with the option M470. The complete brake assembly of the 930 Turbo 3.3, derived for the Porsche 917. Axle brackets and anti-roll bars of the Turbo 3.3 (first 20 mm then 22 mm rear, as well as 23 mm in front). Fuchs wheels with dimensions: Front: 7x16 and Rear 9x16 – with tyres 205/55R16 and 245/50R16 (from Model year 1986). The Turbo-Look option package did not include: Bilstein shocks/struts of the Turbo – Instead the Turbo-Look used the Carrera Boge units. The 930 tie rods of the Turbo. There was no independent chassis number given for the M491/M490 optioned vehicles.

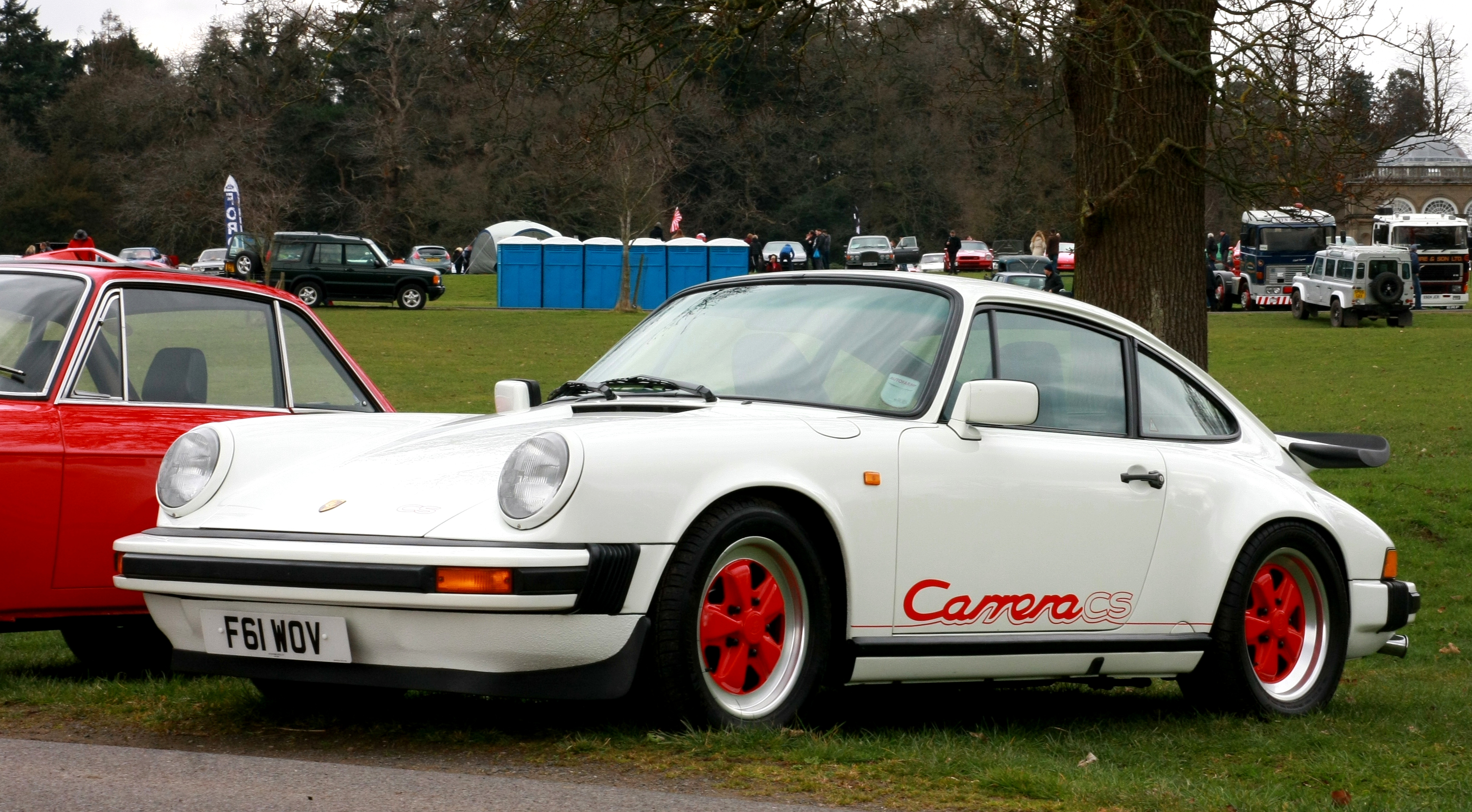
1988 Porsche Carrera CS

In 1985, Porsche introduced the first Carrera Club Sport prototype with the identification number WP0ZZZ91ZF100848. Later on in that year, a 911 Club Sport Row (Rest Of World) with the identification number WP0ZZZ91ZFS101166 was special ordered for a Porsche driver that was particularly inspired by the CS prototype on the track. From 1987 to September 1989, Porsche decided to produce 340 units for their customers that wanted a track inspired road car, The 911 Carrera Club Sport (CS) (option M637), is a reduced weight version of the standard Carrera purposely built for club racing, it gained engine and suspension modifications. The CS had a blueprinted engine with hollow intake valves and a higher rev limit, deletion of: all power options, sunroof (except one unit), air conditioning (except two units), radio, rear seat, undercoating, sound insulation, rear wiper, door pocket lids, fog lamps, front hood locking mechanism, engine and luggage compartment lights, lockable wheel nuts and even the rear lid "Carrera" logo, all in order to save an estimated 70 kg (150 lb) in weight. With the exception of CS cars delivered to the UK, all are identifiable by the "CS Club Sport" decal on the left front fender and came in a variety of colours, some special ordered. Some U.S. CS cars did not have the decal installed by the dealer; however, all have a "SP" stamp on the crankcase and cylinder head. The UK cars were all finished "Grand Prix White" with a red "Carrera CS" decal on each side of the car and red wheels. Although the CS was well received by the club racers, because it cost more than the standard 911, but had fewer comfort features. According to Porsche Club of America and Porsche Club Great Britain CS Registers, 21 are documented as delivered to the U.S. in 1988 with 7 in 1989, one to Canada in 1988 and 53 to the United Kingdom from 1987 to 1989.

In 1988, Porsche produced 875 examples of the CE or Commemorative Edition 911 Carrera in coupe, targa and cabriolet variants to mark the production of the 250,000th 911. Distinguishing features include special diamond blue metallic paint with colour-matched Fuchs wheels, front and rear spoilers, and interior carpets and leather. These cars also featured Dr. Ferdinand Porsche's signature embroidered on the seats in the headrest area. Of the 875 examples produced, only 300 were imported to the US (120 coupes, 100 cabrio's and 80 Targa's), 250 were sold in Germany, 50 went to the UK, and the remainder to other countries.

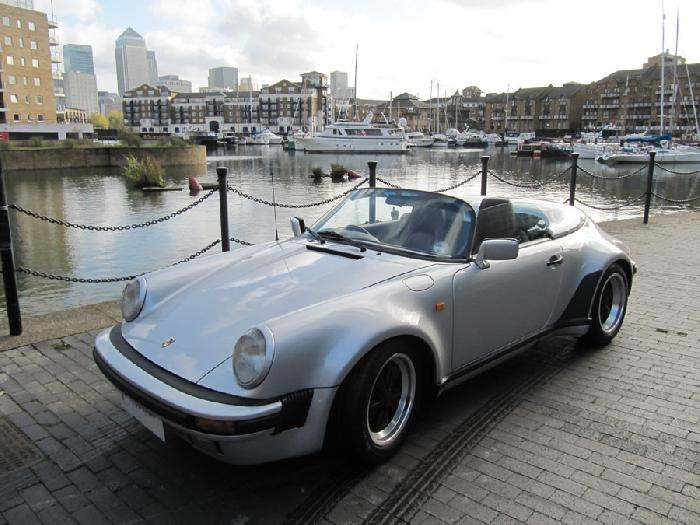
Porsche 911 Carrera 3.2 Speedster "Turbo-Look"

For 1989, Porsche produced the 25th Anniversary Special Edition model to mark the 25th year of 911 production. The 1989 Porsche brochure lists production of 500 U.S. market cars, of which 300 were coupés (240 in silver metallic paint and 60 in satin black metallic), and 200 cabriolet models (160 in silver and 40 in black). All had "silk grey" leather with black accent piping and silk grey velour carpeting. Included were body colour Fuchs wheels in 6x16 (front) and 8x16 (rear), stitched leather console with an outside temperature gauge and a CD or cassette holder, a limited-slip differential, and a short shifting gear lever, as well as small bronze "25th Anniversary Special Edition" badges.

The 911 Speedster (option M503), a low-roof version of the Cabriolet which was evocative of the 356 Speedster of the 1950s, was produced in limited numbers (2,104 units) starting in January 1989 until July 1989 as both a narrow body car and a Turbo-look. The narrow version production was 171 units. The Speedster started as a design under Helmuth Bott in 1983 but was not manufactured until six years later. It was a two-seat convertible that featured a low swept windshield.

Total production of the 911 3.2 Carrera series was 76,473 cars (35,670 coupé, 19,987 cabrio, 18,468 targa).

According to the manufacturer in 2014, an estimate of around 150,000 of the 911 cars from the model years 1964 to 1989 are still on the road at that date.

=== 964 Series (1989–1993) ===
For 1989, the 911 underwent a major evolution with the introduction of the Type 964. With technologies from the 959 flagship model, this would be an important car for Porsche, since the world economy was undergoing recession and the company could not rely on its image alone. It was launched as the Carrera 4, the "4" indicating four-wheel-drive, demonstrating the company's commitment to engineering. Drag coefficient was down to 0.32. A rear spoiler deployed at high speed, preserving the purity of design when the vehicle was at rest. The chassis was redesigned overall. Coil springs, ABS brakes and power steering made their debut. The engine was increased in size to 3,600 cc and was rated at 184 kW (250 PS; 247 hp). The rear-wheel-drive version, the Carrera 2, arrived a year later.

The 964 incarnation of the 911 Turbo returned in 1990 after an absence from the price lists. At first, it used a refined version of the 3.3 L engine of the previous Turbo, but two years later a turbocharged engine based on the 3.6 L engine of the other 964 models was introduced.

In 1990, Porsche introduced the ahead-of-its-time Tiptronic automatic transmission in the 964 Carrera 2, featuring adaptive electronic management and full manual control. The 964 was one of the first cars in the world offered with dual airbags standard (from 1991), the first being the 944 Turbo (from 1987).

In 1992, Porsche re-introduced a limited-edition RS model, inspired by the 1973 Carrera RS and emissions-legal in Europe only. In 1993, appeals from American customers resulted in Porsche developing the RS America of which 701 units were built. In 1994, the RS America returned with rear seats. A total of 84 RS America cars were made in 1994. However, while European RS was a homologation special, RS America was an option delete variant of the regular model. The RS 3.8 of 1993 had Turbo-style bodywork, a larger fixed whale tail in place of the electronically operated rear spoiler, and a 221 kW (300 PS; 296 hp), 3,746 cc (3.7 L) engine.

Since the RS/RS America was intended as a no-compromise, higher performance version of the 964, there were four factory options available: a limited-slip differential, AM/FM cassette stereo, air conditioning, and a sunroof. The interior was more basic than a standard 911 as well; for example, the interior door panels lacked the armrests and door pockets and had a simple pull strap for the opening mechanism.

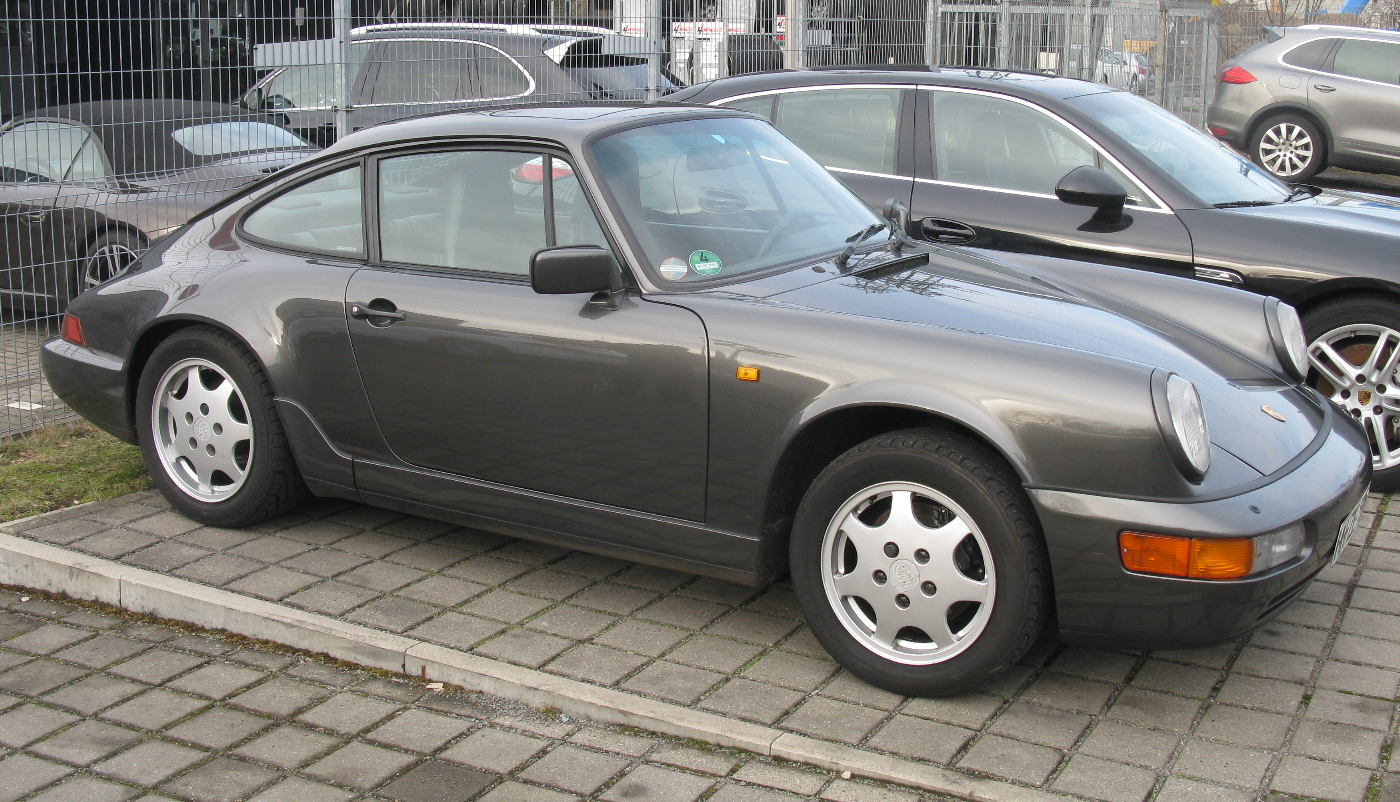
Porsche 911 Carrera 2

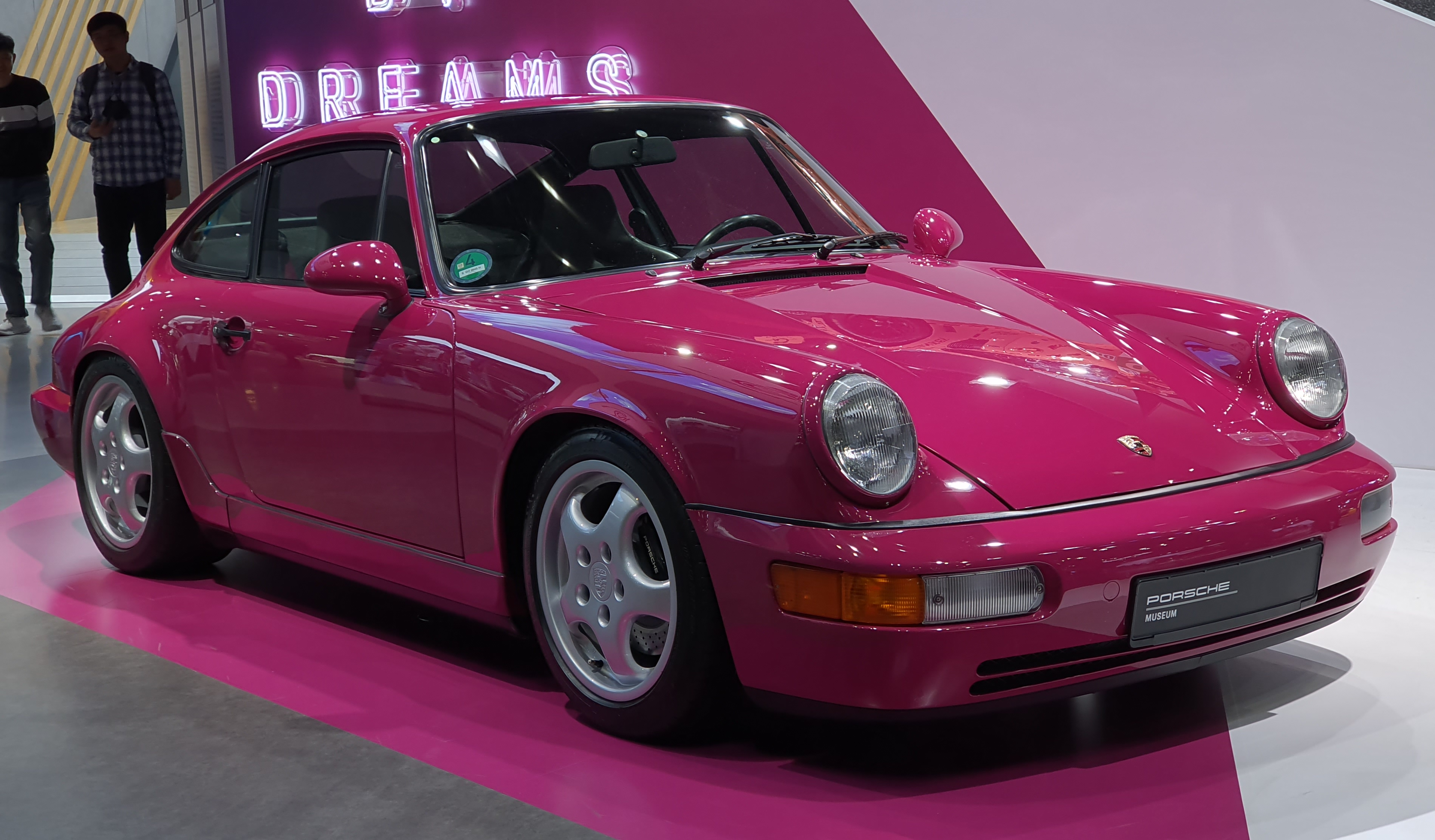
Porsche 964 Carrera RS

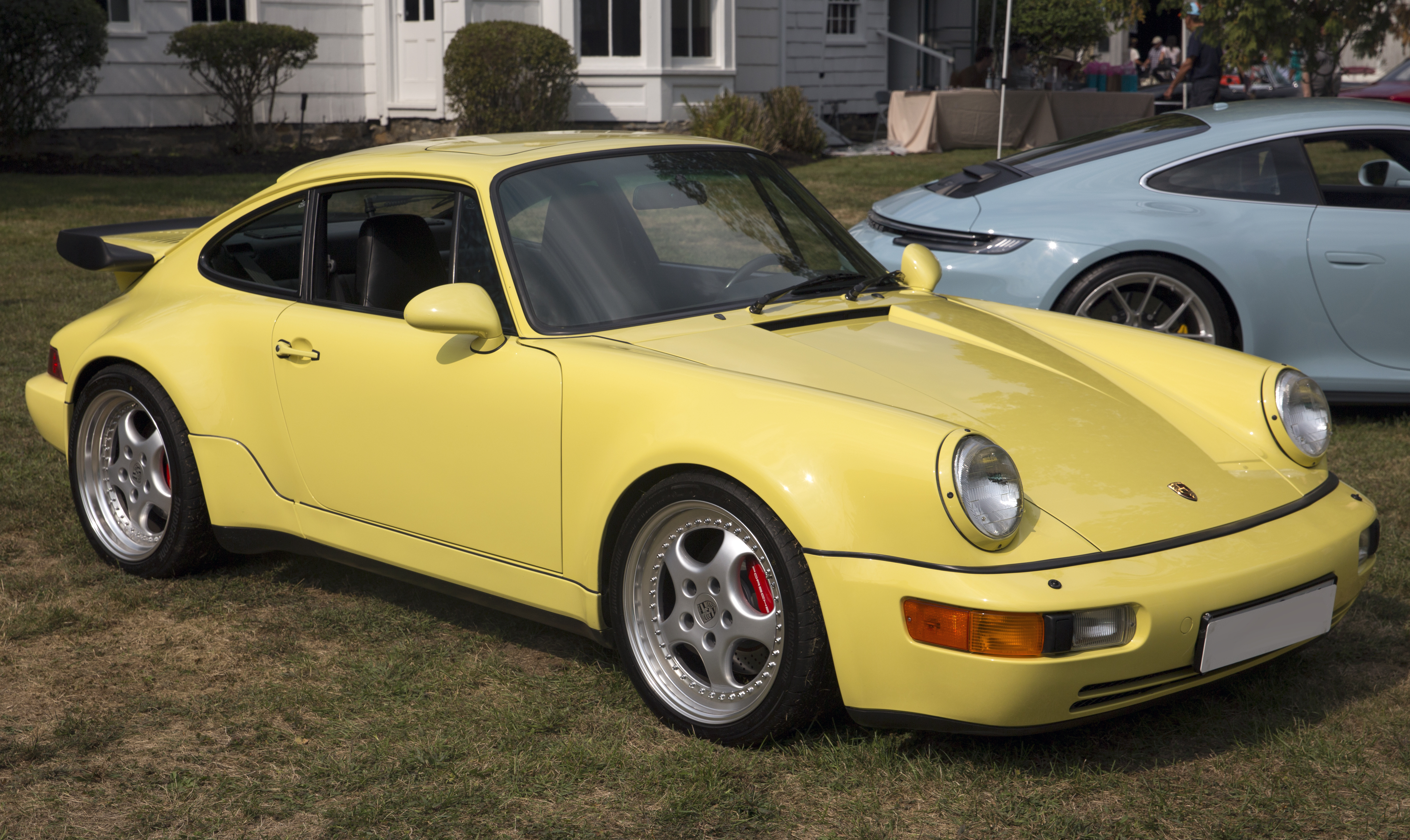
1991 Porsche 964 Turbo

==== 964 Turbo (1990–1994) ====
In 1990 Porsche introduced a turbocharged version of the 964 series. This car is sometimes mistakenly called 965 (this type number actually referred to a stillborn project that would have been a hi-tech turbocharged car in the vein of the 959). For the 1991 through 1993 model years, Porsche produced the 964 Turbo with the 930's 3.3 L engine, improved to have a power output of 235 kW (320 PS; 316 hp). 1994 brought the Carrera 2/4's 3.6 L engine, now in turbocharged form and sending 265 kW (360 PS; 355 hp) to the rear wheels. With the 993 on the way, this car was produced through 1994 and remains rather rare.

=== 993 Series (1994–mid 1998) ===
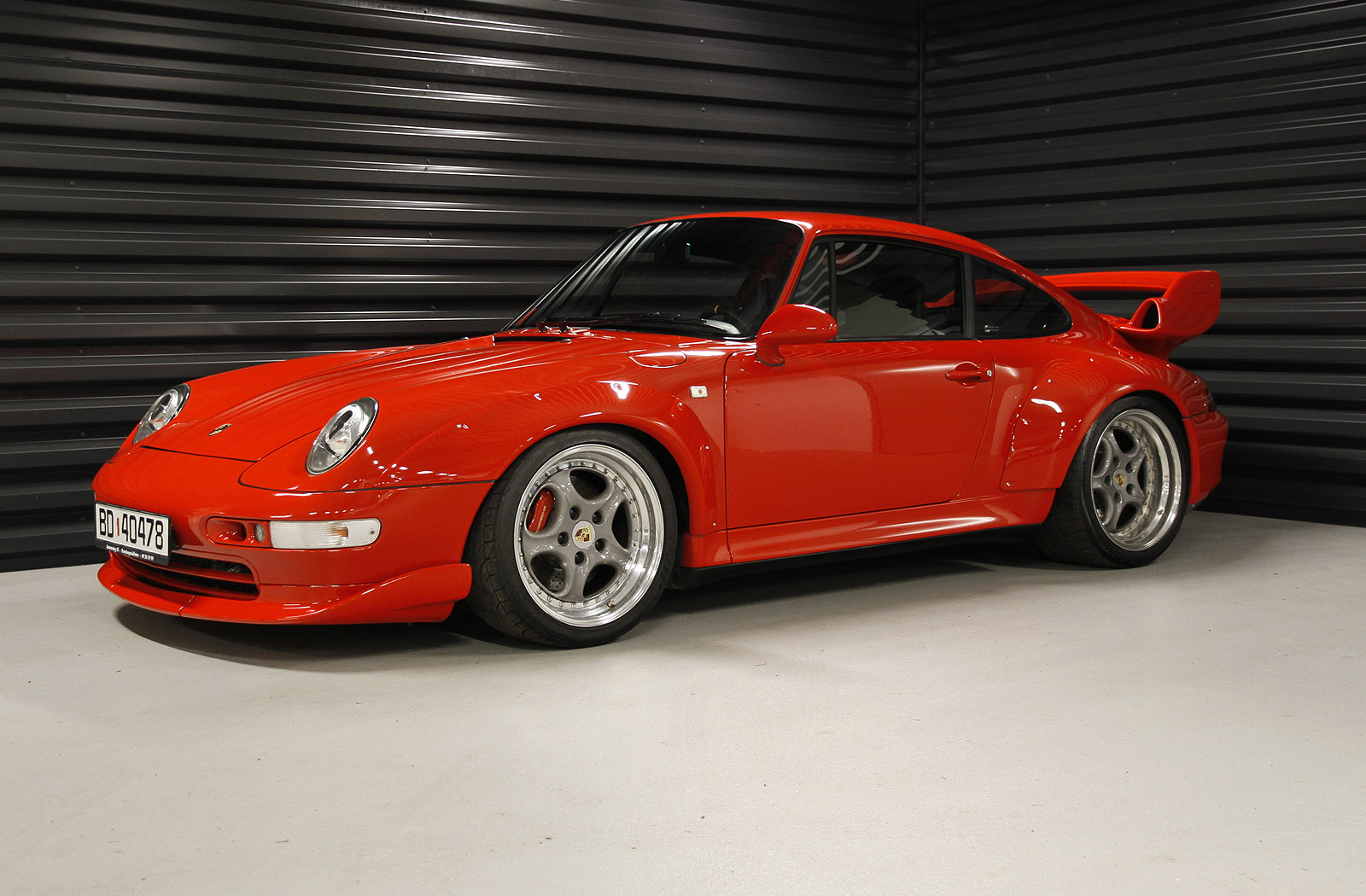
The mid-nineties Type 993 had sleeker bodywork. This is the high-performance GT2 variant.

The 911 was again revised for model year 1994 under the internal name Type 993. This car was significant as it was the final incarnation of the air-cooled 911 first introduced in 1964. Car and Driver noted, "Porsche's version of the Goldilocks tale is the 993-generation 911, the one many Porschephiles agree that the company got just right," with an "ideal blend of technology and classic 911 air-cooled heritage." Porsche itself refers to the 993 as "a significant advance, not just from a technical, but also a visual perspective." "993s especially [are] widely regarded as the best the 911 ever got."

The exterior featured all-new front and rear ends. The revised bodywork was smoother, having a noticeably more aerodynamic front end somewhat reminiscent of the 959. Styling was by Englishman Tony Hatter under the supervision of design chief Harm Lagaay and was completed in 1991.

Along with the revised bodywork, mechanically the 993 also featured an all-new multilink rear suspension that improved the car's ride and handling. This rear suspension was largely derived from the stillborn Porsche 989's rear multilink design and served to rectify the problems with earlier models' tendency to oversteer if the throttle or brakes were applied mid-corner. These modifications also reduced previous 911's lift-off oversteer problems to a much more moderate degree.

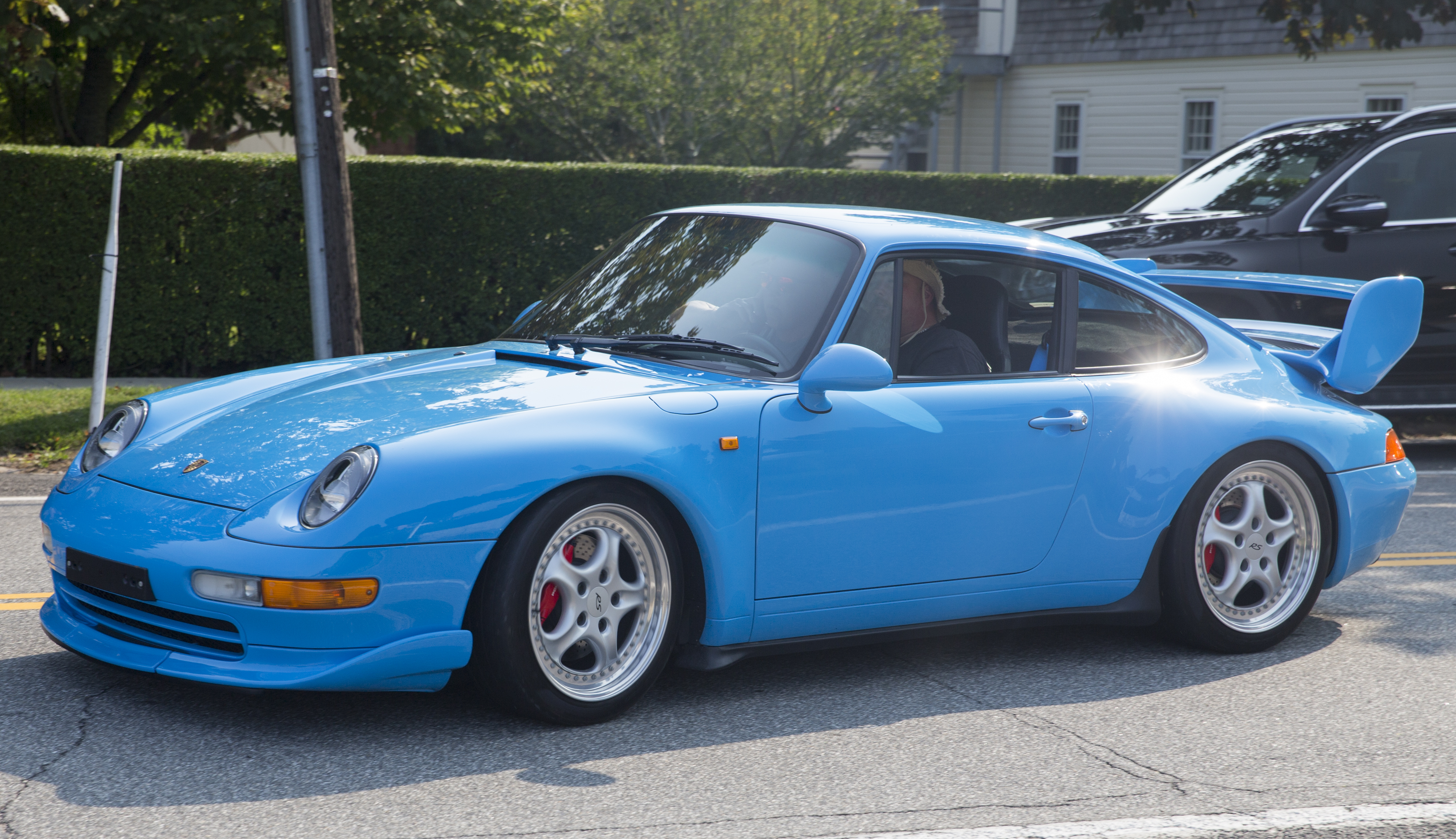
The Porsche 993 Carrera RS continued the tradition of a light weight and minimalist 911 beginning with the 1973 Carrera RS.

The new suspension, along with chassis refinements, enabled the car to keep up dynamically with the competition. Engine capacity remained at 3.6 L, but power rose to 200 kW (272 PS; 268 hp) due to better engine management and exhaust design, and beginning with model year 1996 to 210 kW (286 PS; 282 hp). The 993 was the first Porsche to debut variable-length intake runners with the "Varioram" system on 1996 models. This addressed the inherent compromise between high-rpm power production and low-rpm torque production and was one of the first of its kind to be employed on production vehicles. However, the Varioram version with its OBD II had issues with carbon deposits, resulting in failed smog tests. This caused expensive repairs and made comparisons with the 1995 car (with OBD I and just 12 hp less) inevitable. Meanwhile, a new four-wheel-drive system was introduced as an option in the form of the Carrera 4, the rear-wheel-drive versions simply being called Carrera or C2. A lightweight RS variant had a 3.8 L engine rated at 221 kW (300 PS; 296 hp), and was only rear-wheel drive.

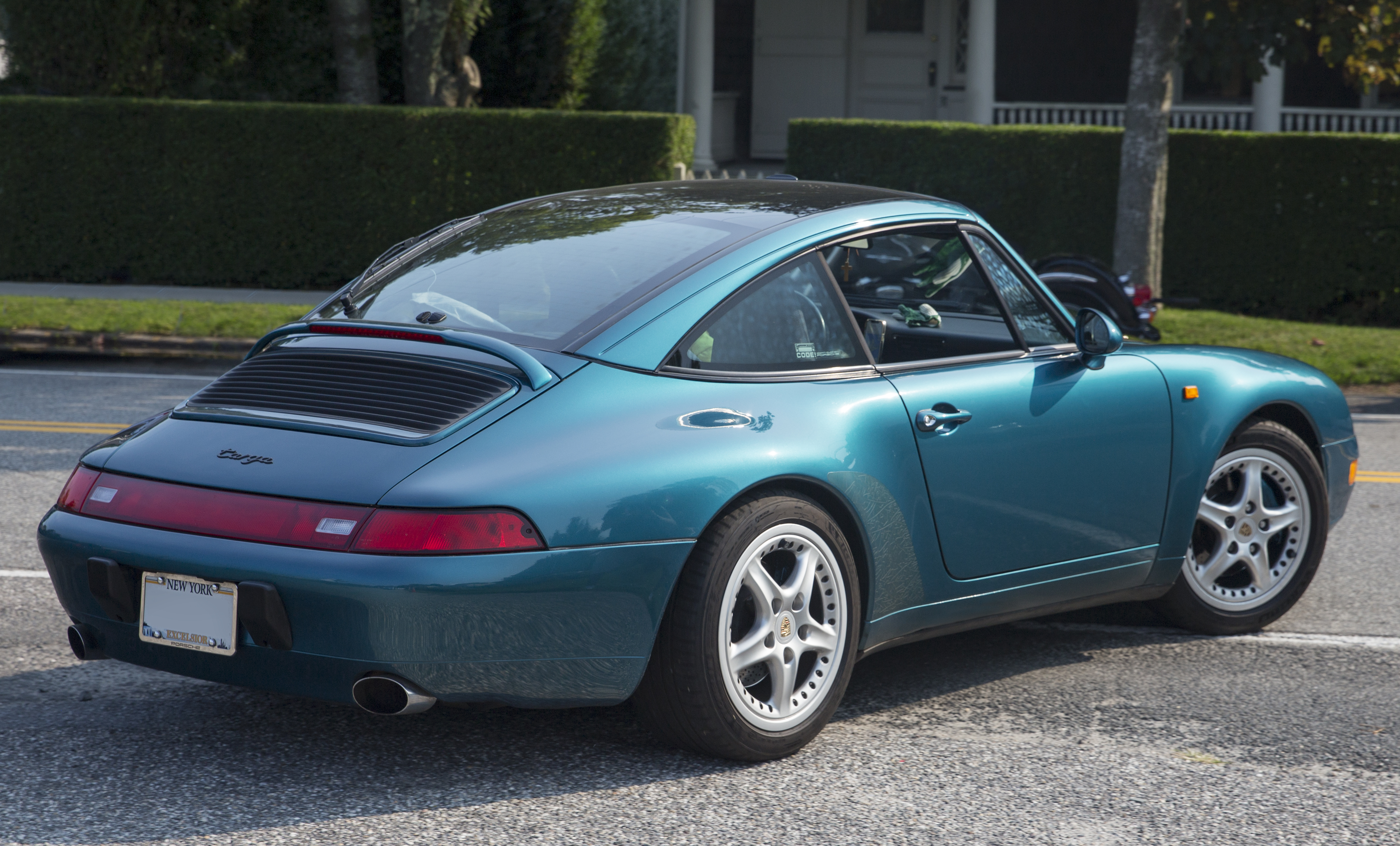
The Porsche 993 Targa had a departure from the classic Targa design, incorporating an expensive glass sliding roof mechanism.

The Targa open-topped model also made a return, this time with a large glass roof that slid under the rear window. The expensive air-cooled 993 Targa had a limited production run between 1996 and 1998. [Production numbers: 1996: US/Can: 462 ROW: 1980, 1997: US/Can: 567 ROW: 1276, 1998: US/Can: 122 (100 Tiptronic / 22 Manual)]

As an investment, the 1997 and 1998 Carrera S version has proven the most desirable (apart from even rarer models such as the RS and Turbo S). "Many find that they are the best looking 911 there is and used prices have always seemed to reflect this. They command a hefty premium in today's market and the very best example wide body cars can be priced more than the higher mileage Turbos." Of the widebody 993 series, "The purists will want 2 wheel drive and nothing else will do." Similarly, purists will insist upon the manual transmission over the automatic "Tiptronic" version; this is even more true in the case of the 993 as compared with other models, because Porsche 993s were the first production model (apart from the 959 flagship sports car) to feature a 6-speed manual transmission. The C2S wide-body 993 models are in scarce supply, with none built in 1995 or 1996, and just 759 units made for North America in 1997, with a final supply of 993 in 1998, for a total of 1,752 C2S examples overall.

==== 993 Turbo (1995–1997) ====
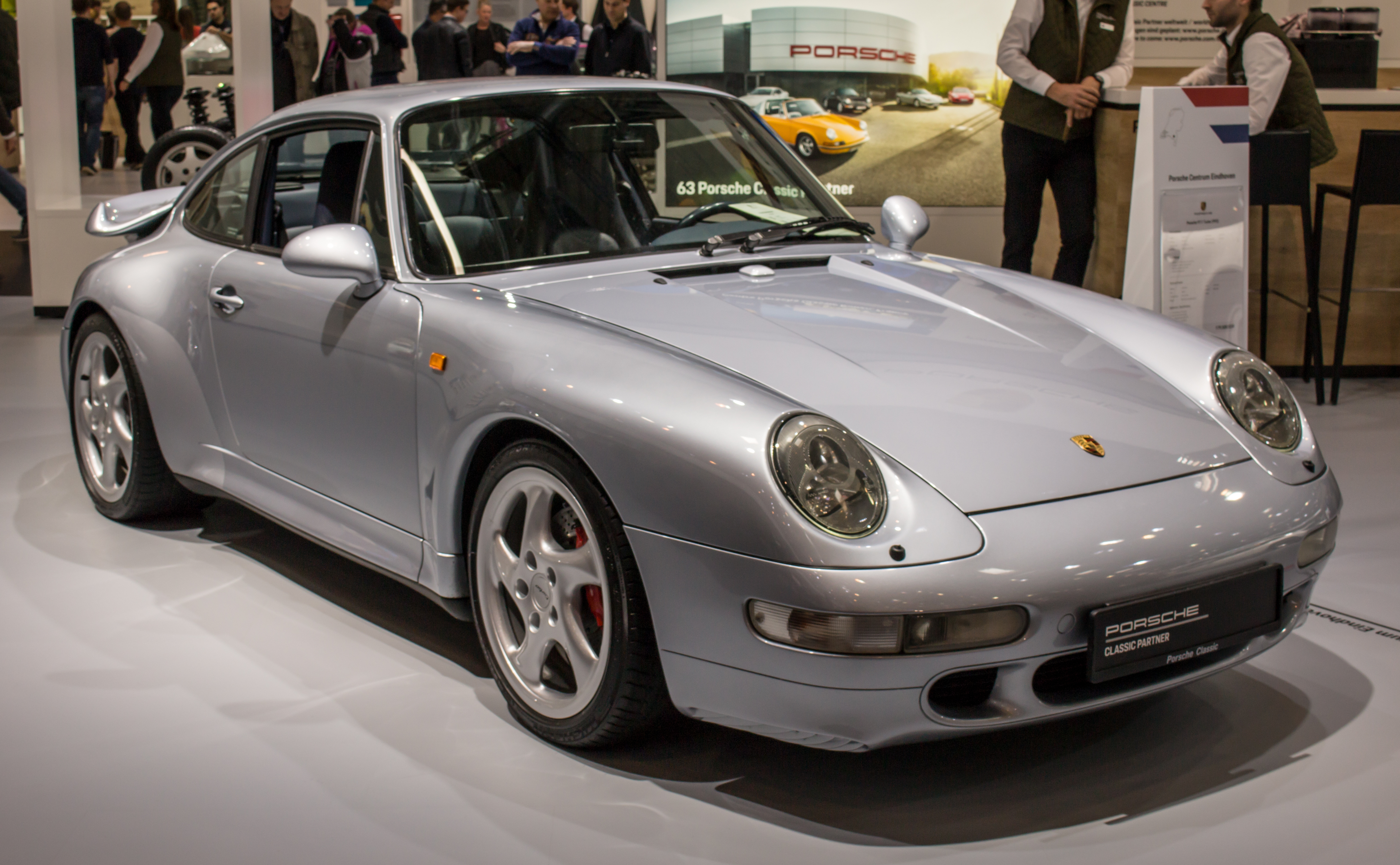
Porsche 993 Turbo

A turbocharged version of the 993 was launched in 1995 and became the first standard production Porsche with twin turbochargers and the first 911 Turbo to be equipped with permanent all-wheel-drive (the homologated GT2 version based on the Turbo retained RWD). The similarity in specification and in performance levels inspired several comparison road tests with the 959. The differences were striking - the 959 had a much smaller engine, sequential turbocharging and a computer-controlled all wheel drive system. The 3.6L twin-turbocharged M64/60 engine is rated at 300 kW (408 PS; 402 hp) at 7,000 rpm and uses an internal combustion powertrain architecture. The performance was outstanding at the time, as 0–60 mph (97 km/h) has been measured at 3.2 seconds, and the braking was even more impressive in 2.3 seconds from the same speed. The car's top speed was measured at 322 km/h (200 mph) The 993 Turbo had parallel turbochargers, 3.6 litres of displacement, and a viscous coupling for the centre differential in the AWD drivetrain. The Turbo was only produced for the 1996 and 1997 model years. The main difference was that the ECU in the 1996 model year could not be flashed for an upgrade, while the 1997 could. Additionally, the 1996 year had Porsche crested centre caps on the wheels, while the 1997 had turbo inscribed. Another difference is the motion sensor and map lights above the interior rear view mirror on the 1997, while the 1996 had no such devices.

In 1997, Porsche introduced a limited run of 183 units of the Sport version of the 993 Turbo dubbed the Turbo S. With an additional 18 kW (24 PS; 24 hp) over the regular Turbo's 300 kW (408 PS; 402 hp), features include a scoop on the side right behind the doors for engine cooling and vents on the whale tail rear spoiler. Aside from upgraded ECU mapping, a centre oil cooler behind the centre air intake at the front bumper was added.

== Water-cooled engines (1998–present) ==
=== 996 (1999–2005) ===
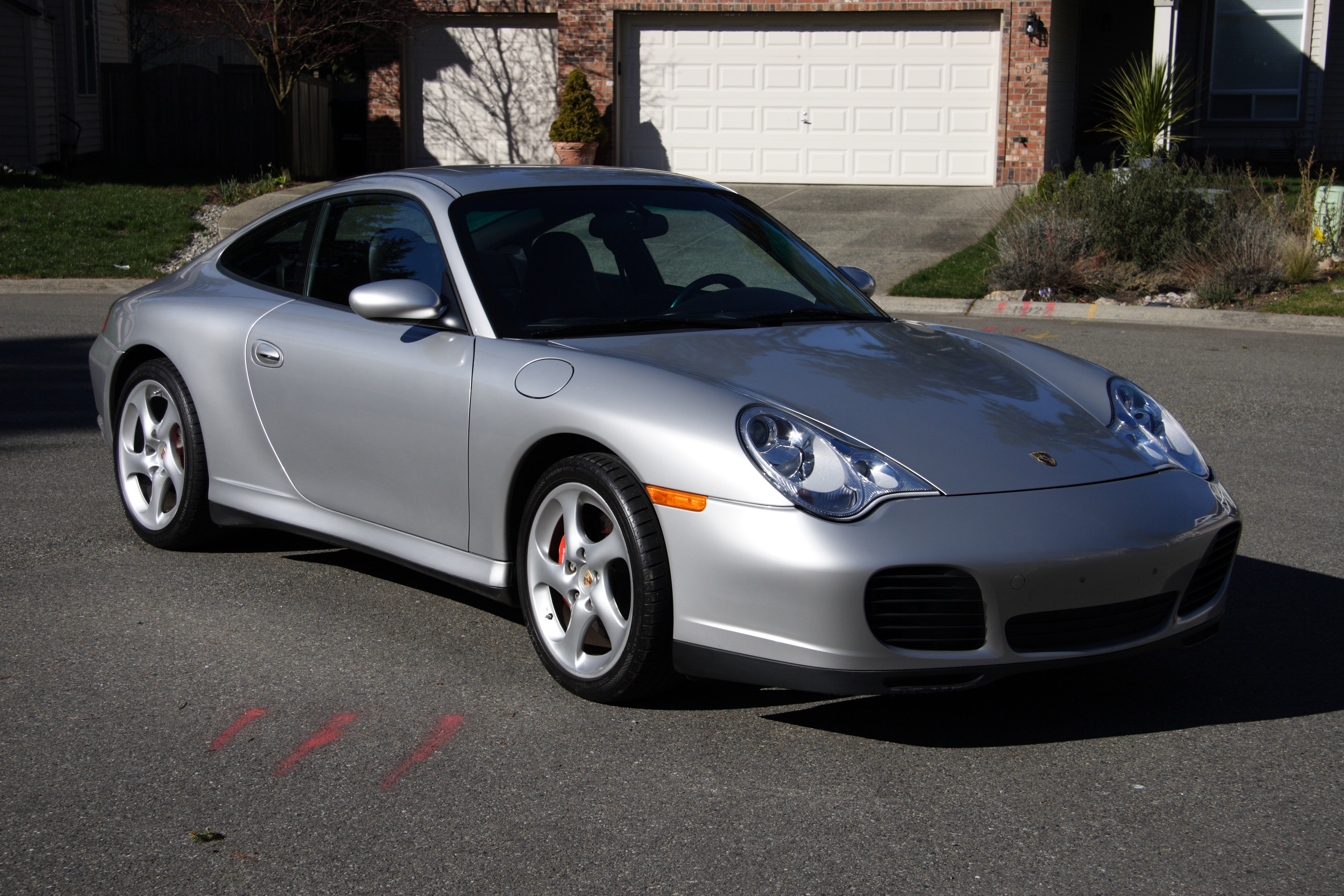
2002 996 Carrera 4S

The Type 996 introduced in 1998 represented two major changes for the 911 lineage: a water-cooled flat-6 engine replaced the popular air-cooled engine used in the 911 for 34 years and the body shell received its first major re-design. Changing to a water-cooled engine was controversial with Porsche traditionalists, who noted this as the end of the 'true' 911.

The 996 shared many front end styling cues with Porsche's mid engine entry-level Boxster. Pinky Lai's work on the exterior won international design awards between 1997 and 2003.

The Carrera variant has a 0.30 coefficient of drag. The interior was criticized for its plainness and its lack of relationship to prior 911 interiors, although this came largely from owners of older 911s.

The Type 996 spawned over a dozen variations, including an all-wheel-drive Carrera 4 and Carrera 4S (the latter which had a 'Turbo look' in facelift form) models, the club racing-oriented GT3 and GT3 RS instead of a Carrera RS variant and the forced-induction 996 Turbo and GT2. The Turbo, which was four-wheel-drive and had a twin-turbocharged engine, often made appearances in magazines' lists of the best cars on sale.

The Carrera and Carrera 4 underwent revisions for the 2002 model year, receiving clear lens front and rear indicator lights which were first seen on the Turbo version two years earlier. This allowed the 911 to be more distinguishable from the Boxster. A mildly revised front fascia was also introduced, though the basic architecture remained.

Engine displacement was 3.4 L and power output was 221 kW (300 PS; 296 hp) featuring a change to an "integrated dry sump" design and variable valve timing. The displacement was increased in 2002 to 3.6 L and power received an increase to 240 kW (320 PS; 320 hp).

The folding roof mechanism on the convertible variants required 19 seconds for operation. An electronically adjustable rear spoiler was installed that raised at speeds over 120 km/h (75 mph). It could also be raised manually by means of an electric switch.

Starting from the models with water-cooled engines, all variants of the 911 Carrera do not come with rear limited-slip differential, except the 40th Anniversary 911, GT2, GT3 and Turbo. The exception would be for MY1999 where the limited-slip differential was available as option code 220.

==== 996 GT3 (1999–2004) ====
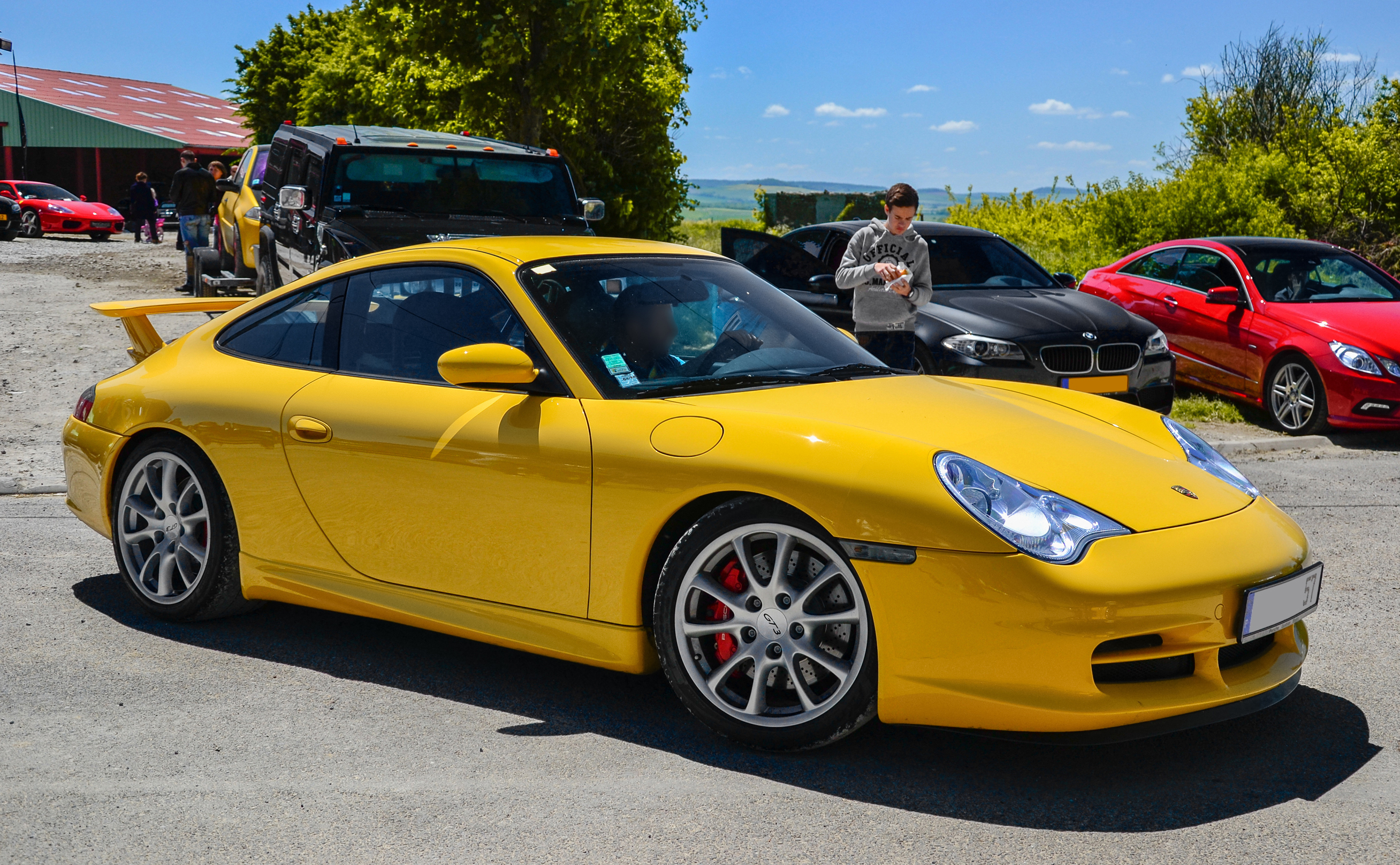
996 GT3

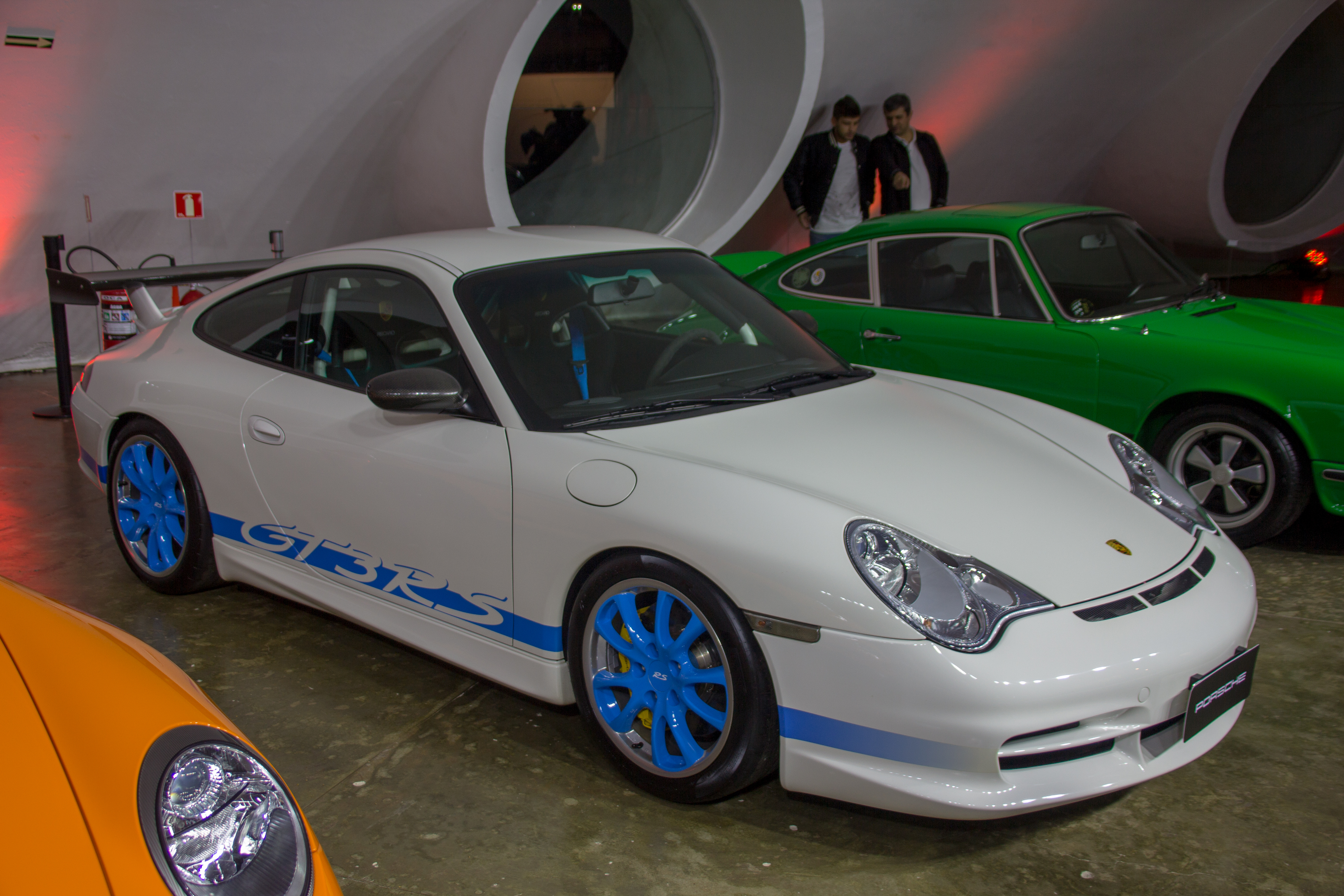
996 GT3 RS

Porsche introduced a road-legal GT3 version of the 996 series which was derived from the company's racing car used in the GT3 class racing. Simply called GT3, the car featured lightweight materials including thinner windows and deletion of the rear seats. The GT3 was a lighter and more focused design with an emphasis on handling and performance, a concept that dates back to the 1973 Carrera RS. The suspension ride height was lowered and tuned for responsiveness over compliance and comfort. These revisions improved handling and steering. Of more significance was the engine used in the GT3. Instead of using a version of the water-cooled units found in other 996 models, the naturally aspirated engine was derived from the 911 GT1 '98 sports-prototype racing car and featured lightweight materials which enabled the engine to have higher rpm.

The engine used was a naturally aspirated 3,600 cc (3.6 L) flat-six rather than the engine from the pre-facelift and revised Carrera. The 996 GT3 is capable of accelerating from 0 to 100 km/h (62 mph) in 4.4 seconds and from 0 to 200 km/h (124 mph) in 14 seconds, with a maximum speed of 306 km/h (190 mph). It is rated at 268 kW (365 PS; 360 hp) at first and later improved to 284 kW (386 PS; 381 hp) at the end of the 996 series' revision.

==== 996 Turbo (2001–2005) ====
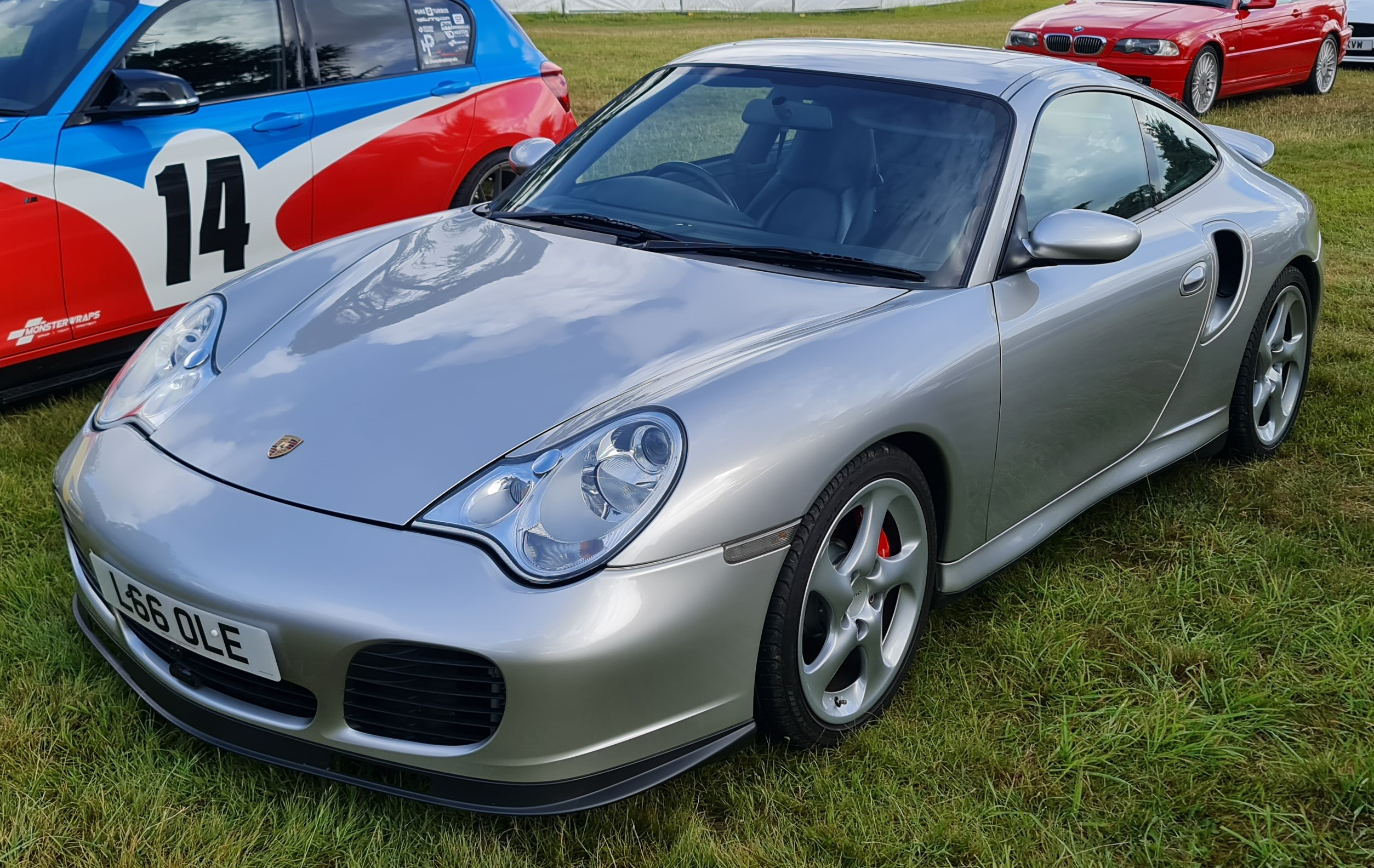
996 Turbo

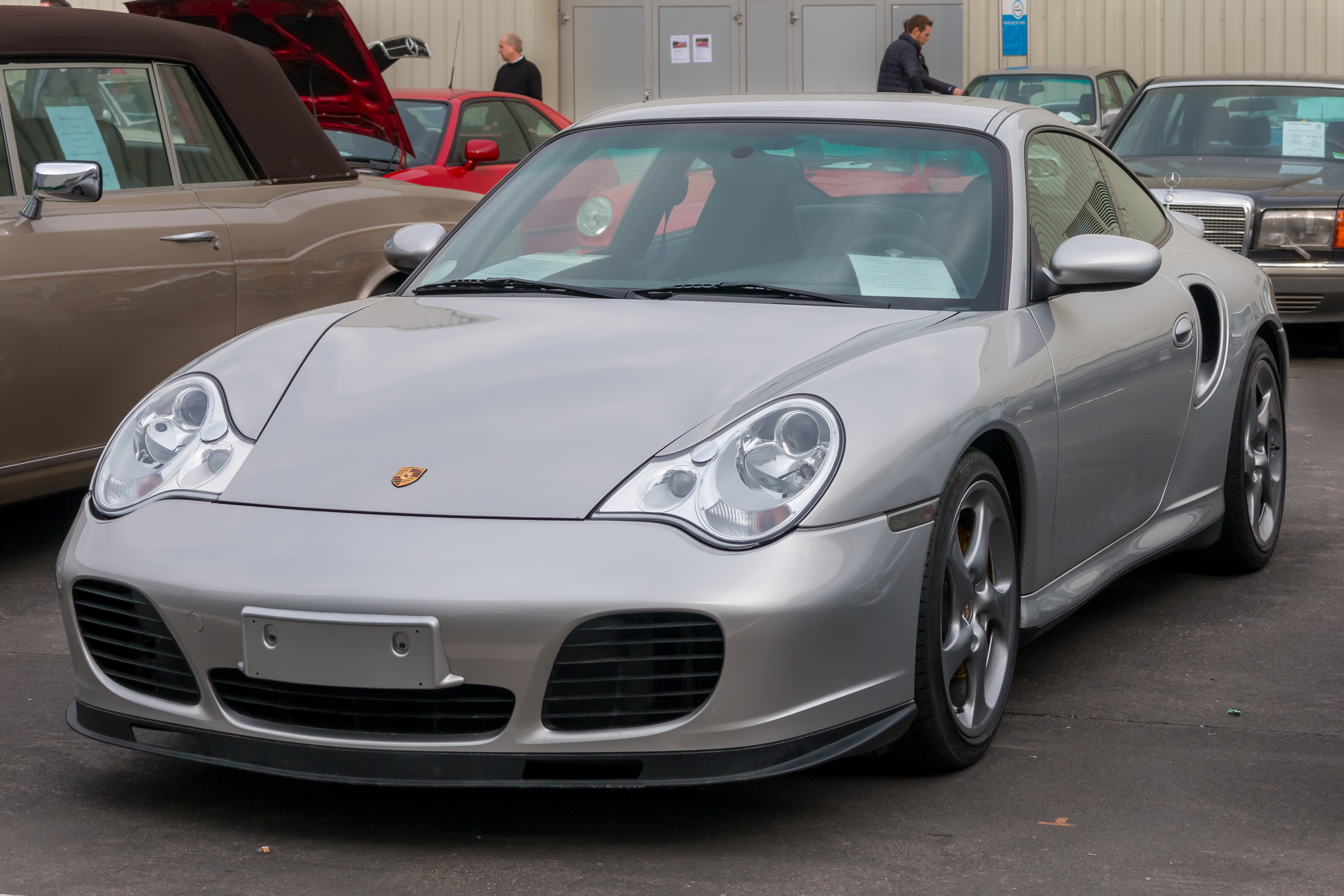
996 Turbo S

In 2000, Porsche launched the turbocharged version of the Type 996 for the 2001 model year. Like the GT3, the Turbo's engine was derived from the engine used in the 911 GT1 and, like its predecessor, featured twin-turbos and now had a power output of 309 kW (420 PS; 414 hp). Also like its predecessor, the new Turbo was only available with all-wheel drive. In 2002, the X50 package was available that increased the engine output to 331 kW (450 PS; 444 hp) with 620 N⋅m (457 lb⋅ft) of torque across a wide section of the power band. With the X50 package, the car could accelerate from 0–100 km/h (0–62 mph) in 3.91 seconds. Later on toward the end of the 996 life cycle, the Turbo S nameplate also returned with the debut of the cabriolet variant as well. The Turbo S boasted even more power— 331 kW (450 PS; 444 hp) and 620 N⋅m (457 lb⋅ft)— than the standard Turbo courtesy of the X50 package being standard. The Turbo S was limited to 1,500 units worldwide. The Turbo can reach a top speed of 304 km/h (189 mph).

The styling was more individual than the previous generations of the Turbo. Along with the traditional wider rear wing, the 996 Turbo had different front lights and bumpers when compared to the Carrera and Carrera 4. The rear bumper had air vents reminiscent of those on the 959 and there were large vents on the front bumper.

=== 997 (2004–2012) ===
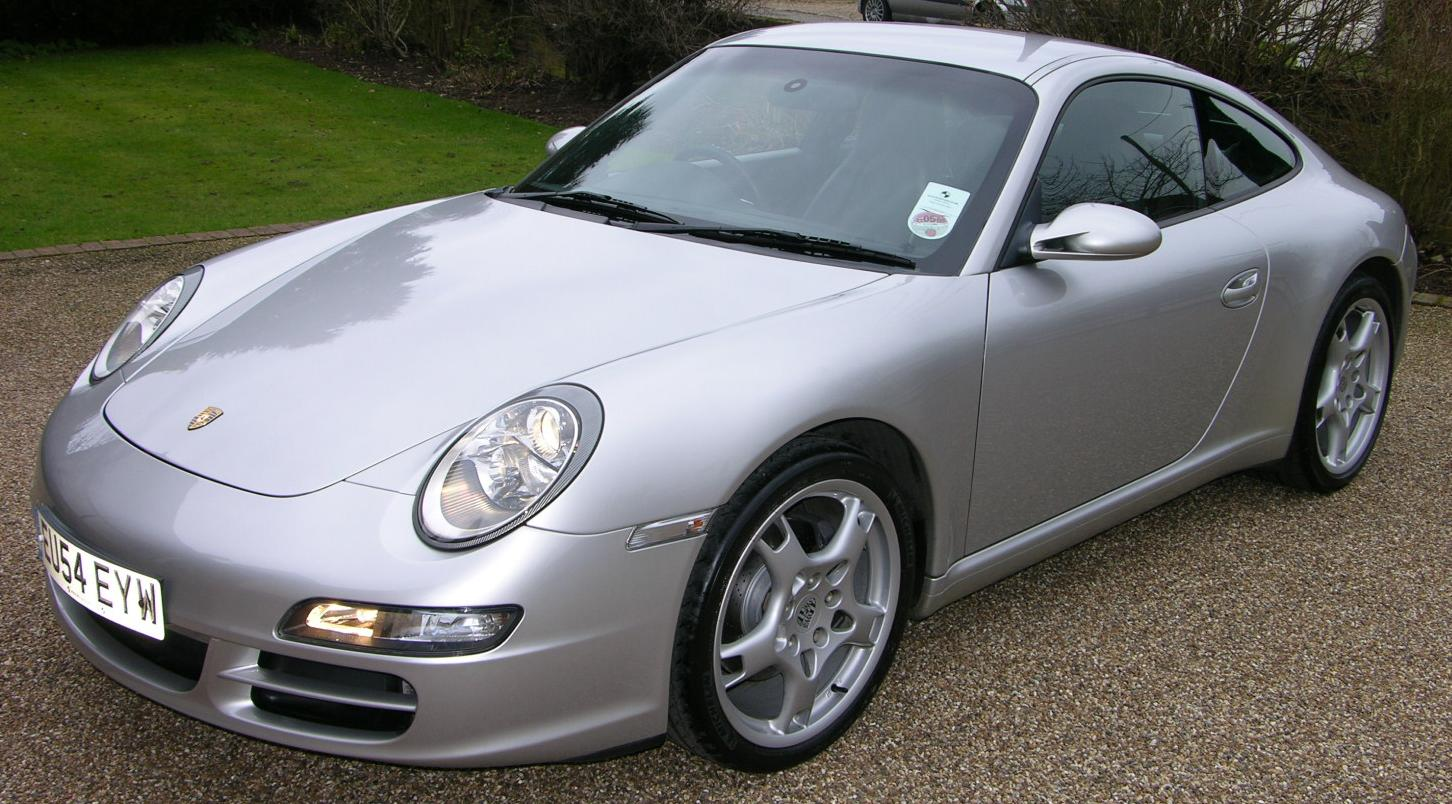
997 Carrera

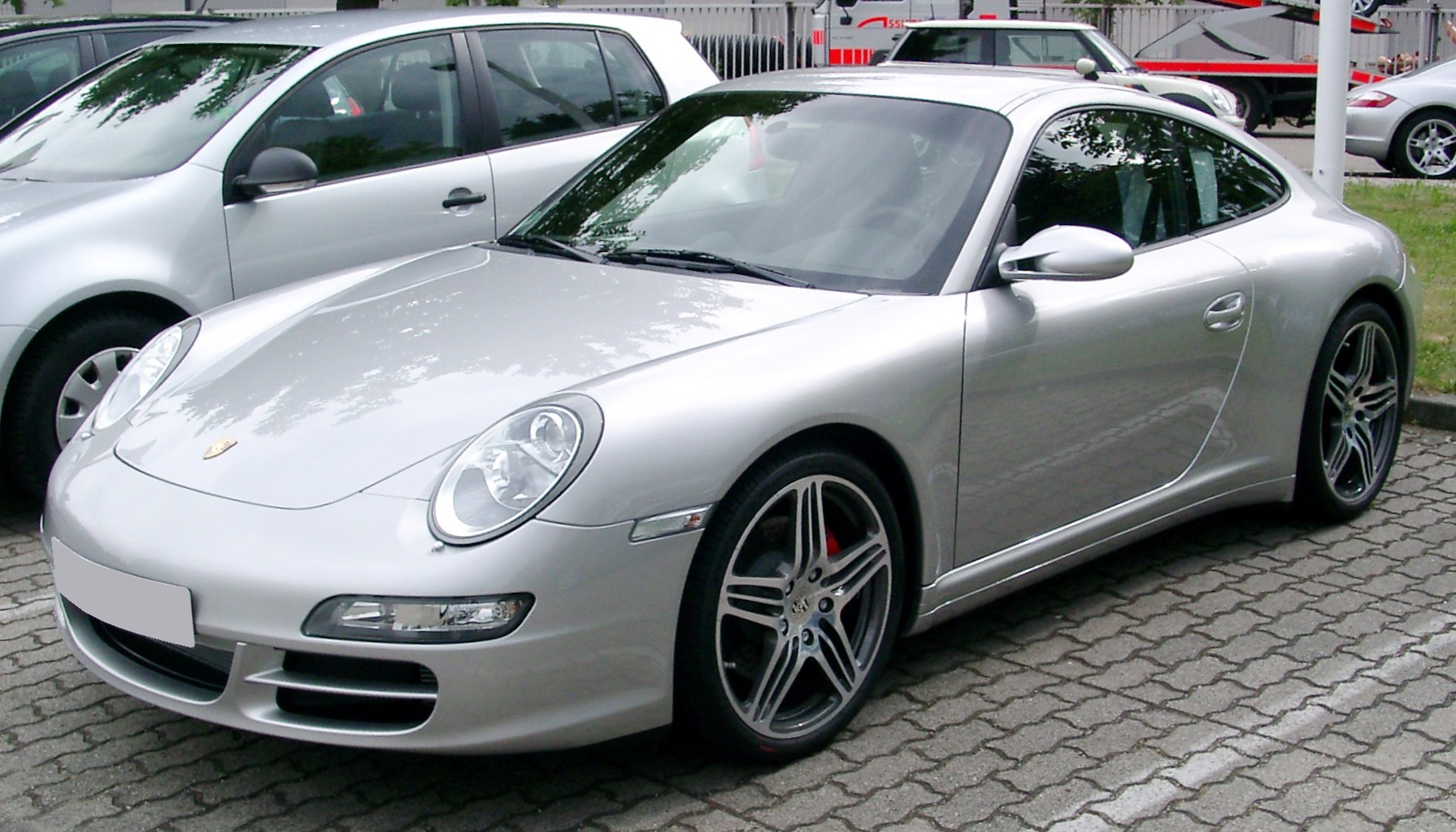
997 Carrera S

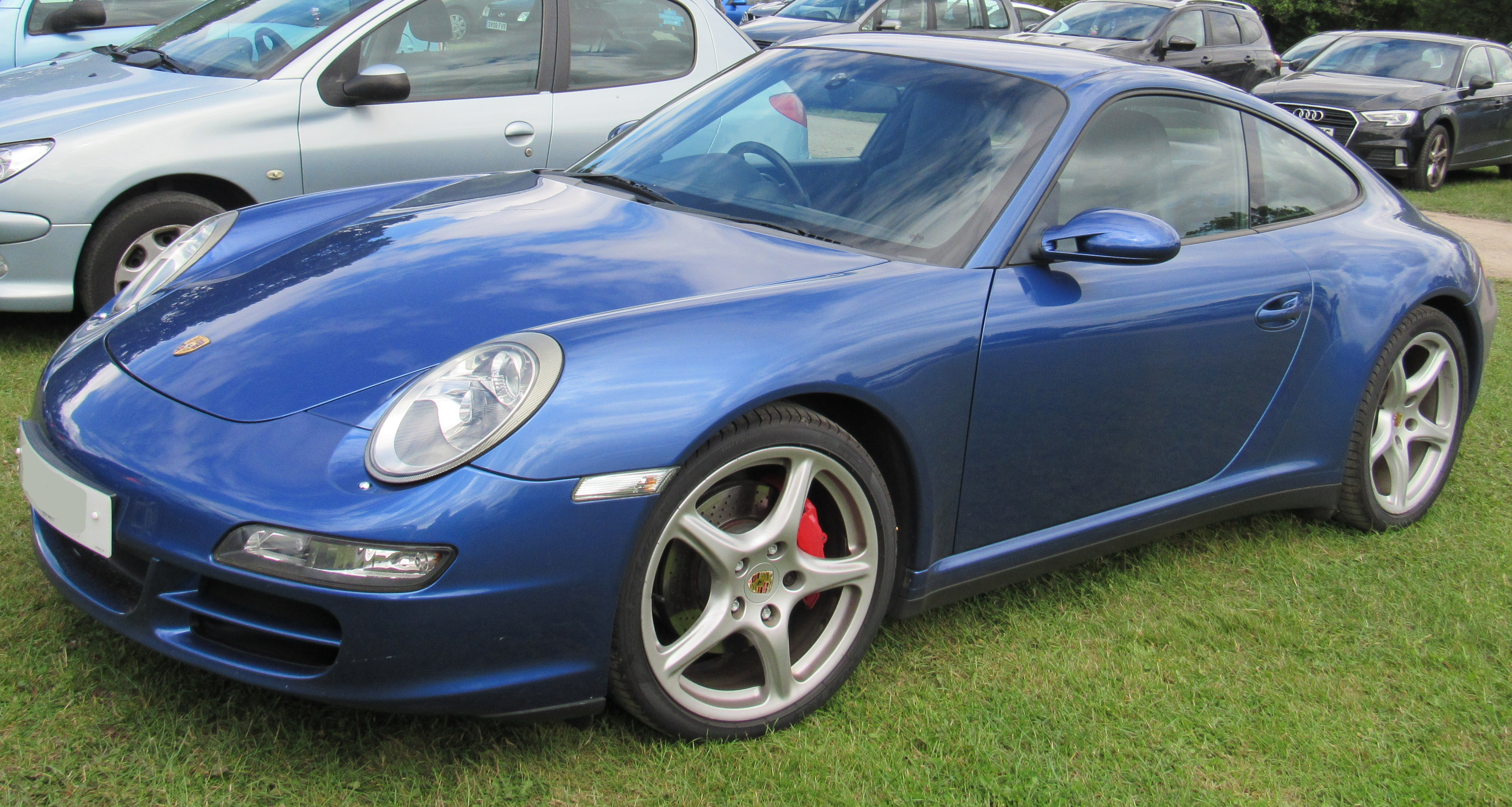
997 Carrera 4S

The 996 was replaced with the 997 in 2004, for the 2005 model year. It retains the 996's basic profile, with an even lower 0.28 drag coefficient, but draws on the 993 for detailing. In addition, the new headlights revert to the original bug-eye design from the teardrop scheme of the 996. Its interior is also similarly revised, with strong links to the earlier 911 interiors while at the same time looking fresh and modern. The 997 shares less than a third of its parts with the outgoing 996, but is still technically similar to it.

Initially, two versions of the 997 were introduced— the rear-wheel-drive Carrera and Carrera S. While the base 997 Carrera had a power output of 325 PS (239 kW; 321 hp) from its 3.6 L Flat 6, a more powerful 3.8 L 355 PS (261 kW; 350 hp) Flat 6 powers the Carrera S. Besides a more powerful engine, the Carrera S also comes standard with 19 in (48 cm) "Lobster Fork" style wheels, more powerful and larger brakes (with red calipers), lowered suspension with PASM (Porsche Active Suspension Management: dynamically adjustable dampers), Xenon headlamps, and a sports steering wheel.

In late 2005, Porsche introduced the all-wheel-drive versions to the 997 lineup. Carrera 4 models (both Carrera 4 and Carrera 4S) were announced as 2006 models. Both Carrera 4 models are wider than their rear-wheel-drive counterparts by 1.76 in (45 mm) to cover wider rear tyres. The 0–100 km/h (0–62 mph) acceleration time for the Carrera 4S with the 355 PS (261 kW; 350 hp) engine equipped with a manual transmission was reported at 4.8 seconds. The 0–100 km/h (62 mph) acceleration for the Carrera S with the 355 PS (261 kW; 350 hp) was noted to be as fast as 4.2 seconds in a Motor Trend comparison, and Road & Track has timed it at 3.8 seconds. The 997 lineup includes both 2- and 4-wheel-drive variants, named Carrera and Carrera 4 respectively. The Targas (4 and 4S), released in November 2006, are 4-wheel-drive versions that divide the difference between the coupés and the cabriolets with their dual, sliding glass tops.

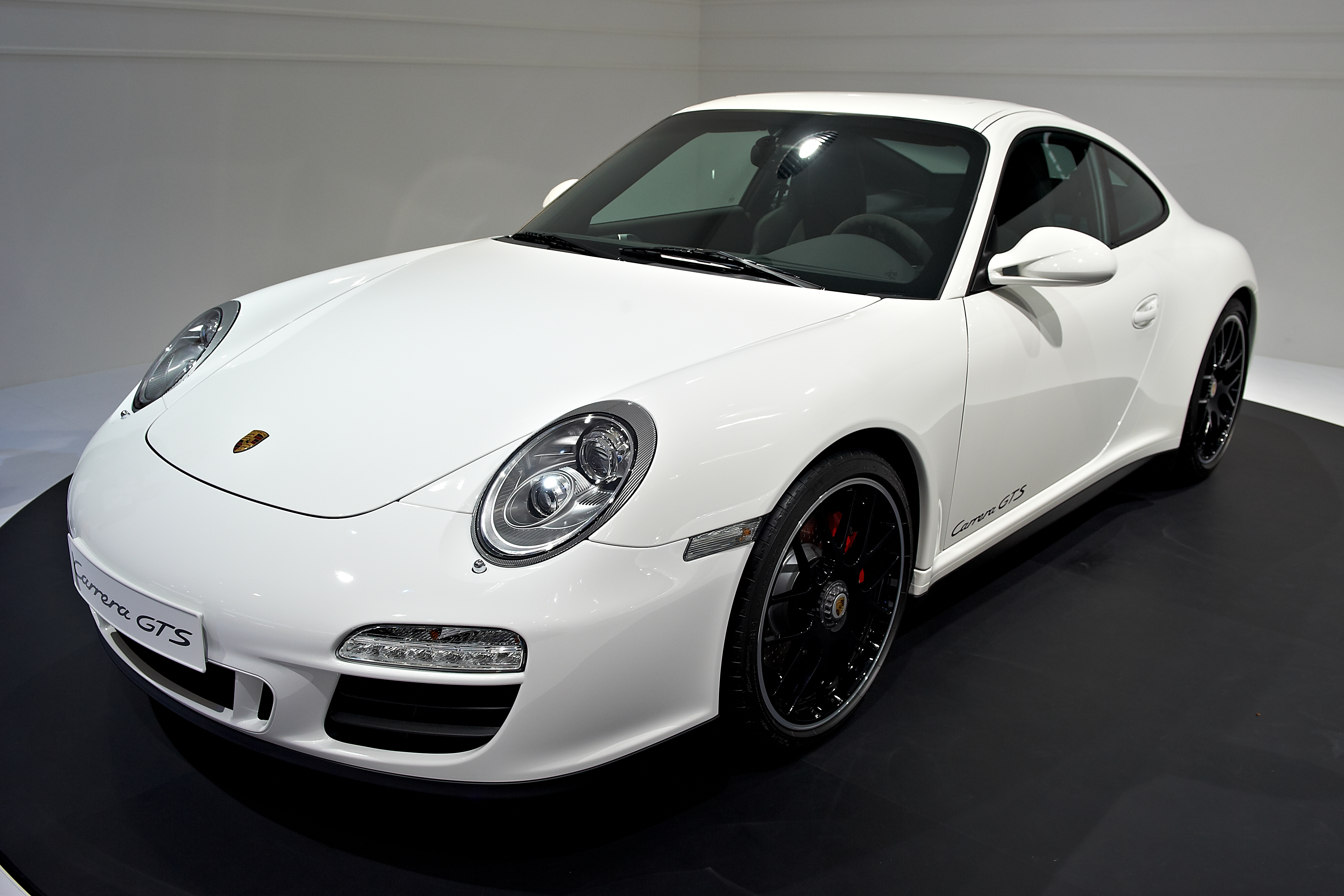
Porsche 997 GTS

The 997 received a larger air intake in the front bumper, new headlights, new rear taillights, new clean-sheet design direct fuel injection engines, and the introduction of a dual-clutch gearbox called PDK for the 2009 model year. They were also equipped with Bluetooth support.

The change to the 7th generation (991) took place in the middle of the 2012 model year. A 2012 Porsche 911 can either be a 997 or a 991, depending on the month of the production.

==== 997 Turbo ====
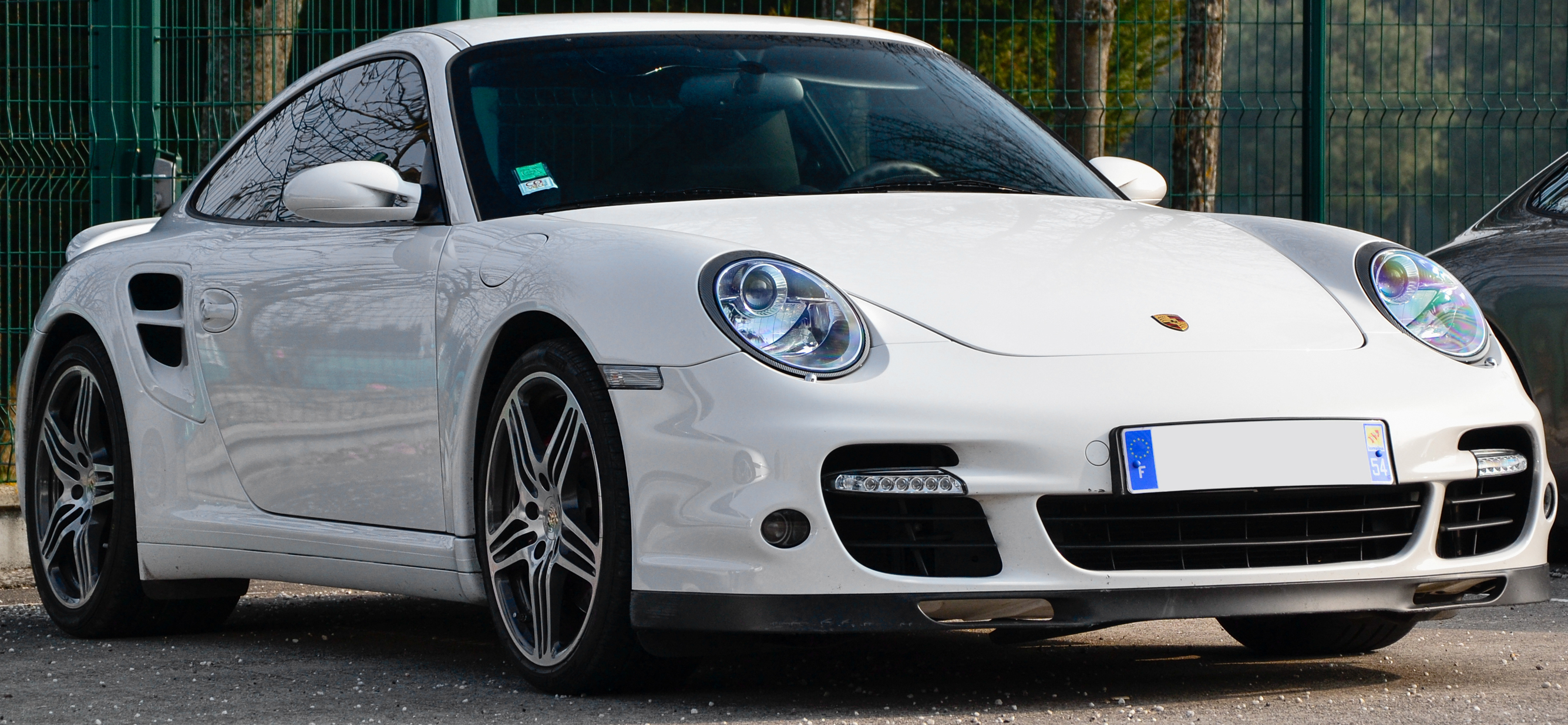
997 Turbo

The turbocharged version of the 997 series featured the same 3.6 L twin-turbocharged engine as the 996 Turbo, with modifications to have a power output of 480 PS (353 kW; 473 hp) and 620 N⋅m (457 lb⋅ft) of torque. It has VTG (variable turbine geometry), that combines the low-rev boost and quick responses of a small turbocharger with the high-rev power of a larger turbocharger. It also offers higher fuel efficiency compared to the 996 Turbo. The 997 Turbo features a new all-wheel-drive system, similar to the one found on the Cayenne. The new PTM (Porsche Traction Management) system incorporates a clutch-based system that varies the amount of torque to the wheels to avoid tyre slippage. According to Porsche, redirecting torque to control oversteer or understeer results in neutral handling as well as greatly improved performance in all weather conditions.

For the face lifted 2010 model year 911 Turbo, known internally as the 997.2 (as opposed to the 997.1 2007–2009 model years), launched in August 2009, the PTM system was tweaked to give a more rearward power bias. The paddle shifters for the PDK dual-clutch transmission debuted on the Turbo. The turbo uses a different engine. The previous water-cooled turbo models (996 and 997) measured 3,600cc. This new engine measures 3,800 cc (4 L) and was first developed for the Carrera that was launched in 2008. The variable-vane twin turbochargers have also been reworked to increase responsiveness, and the intercooler and fuel system were uprated. The engine has a power output of 493 PS (363 kW; 486 hp) which is 20 hp more than the outgoing model. The steering wheel also houses a display showing when Sport, Sport Plus and launch control have been selected through the optional Sport Chrono package. Porsche claimed that the new 911 turbo will accelerate from 0 to 100 km/h (0 to 62 mph) in 3.4 seconds, or 0–60 mph in 3.2 seconds and could reach a top-speed of 312 km/h (194 mph).

As with the 996 Turbo, the car featured distinctive styling cues over the Carrera models including front LED driving/parking/indicator lights mounted on a horizontal bar across the air intakes. The traditional rear wing is a variation of the 996 bi-plane unit.

A new 911 Turbo S was set for production in 2010. It is a fully optioned Porsche 911 Turbo with a PDK gearbox and sports exhaust as standard. It also comes with re-engineered turbochargers to give an extra 30 horsepower increase to a total of 523 PS (385 kW; 516 hp).

==== 997 GT3 ====
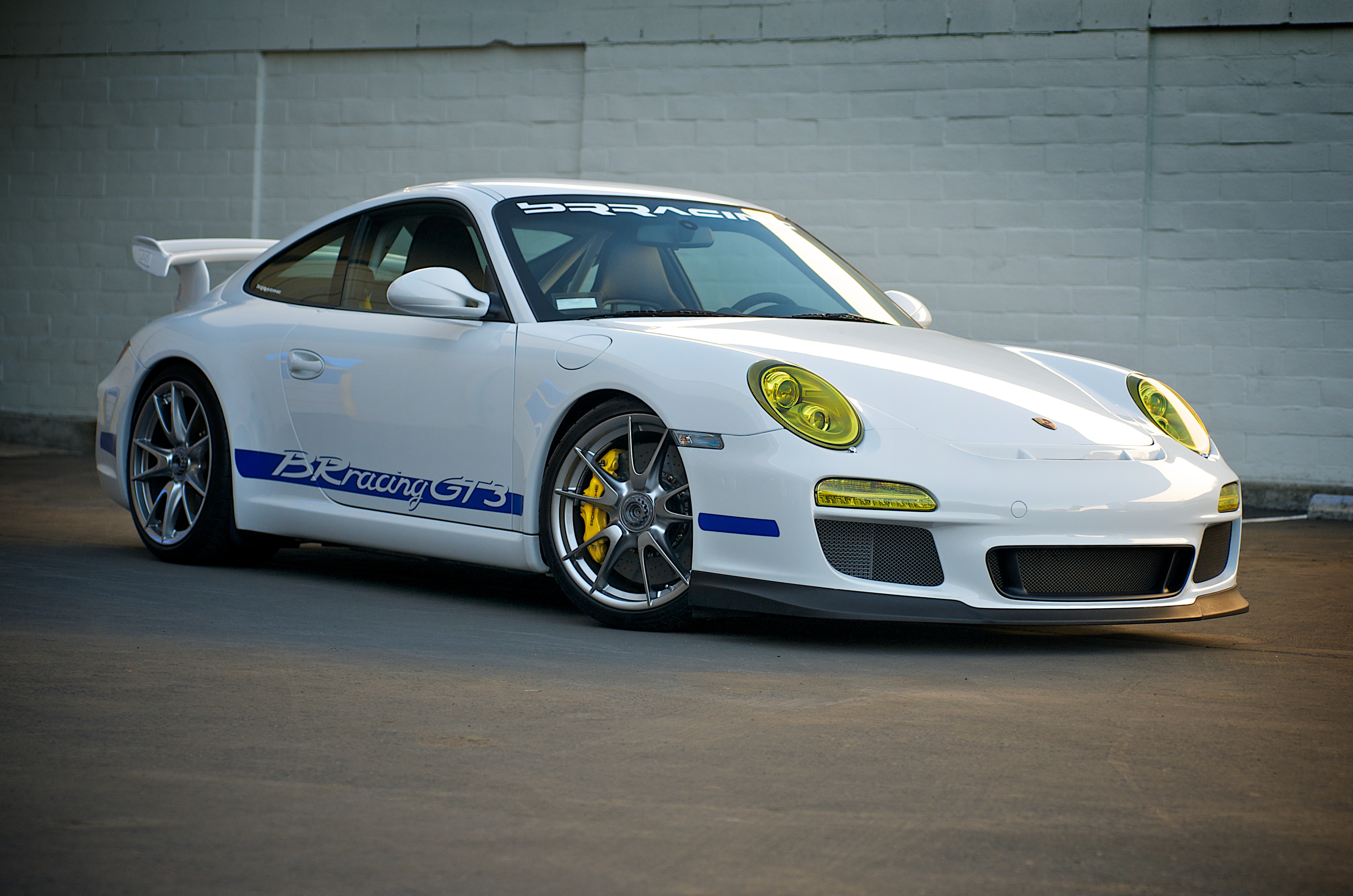
997 GT3

The 911 GT3 was added to the 997 lineage on 23 February 2006. Performance figures include a 0–100 km/h (0–62 mph) acceleration time of 4.1 seconds and a top speed of 310 km/h (193 mph), almost as fast as the Turbo. Porsche's factory reports were proven to be conservative about the performance of the car; Excellence magazine tested the 997 GT3 and recorded a 0–100 km/h (62 mph) of 3.9 seconds and a top speed of 312 km/h (194 mph). It was at that time crowned "the best handling car in America" by Motor Trend.

==== 997 GT3 RS ====
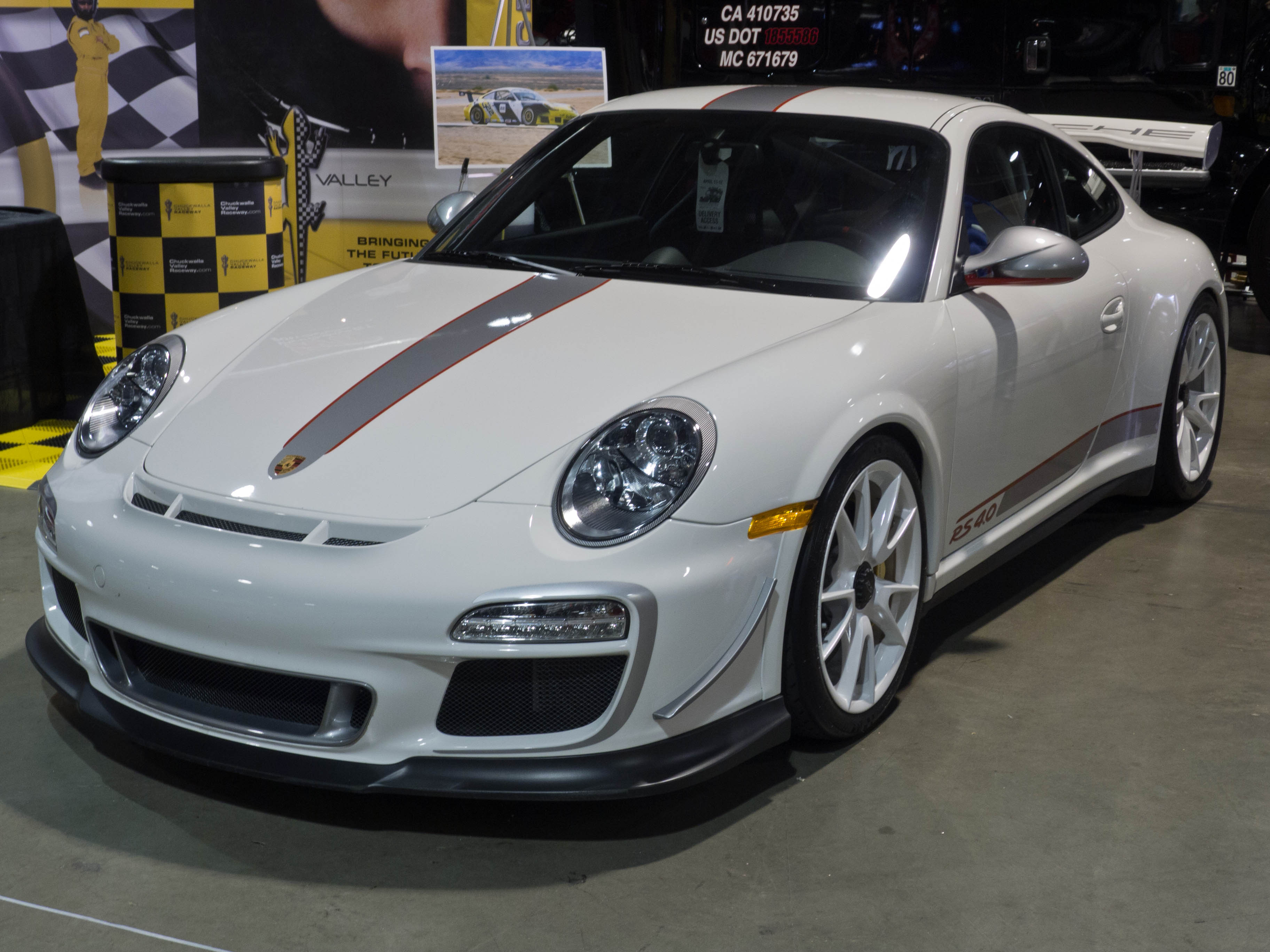
997 GT3 RS 4.0

The 911 GT3 RS was announced in early 2006 as a homologation version of the GT3 RSR racing car for competition events like Sebring and the 24 Hours of Le Mans.

The drivetrain of the RS is based on the 911 GT3, except for the addition of a lightweight flywheel and closer gear ratios for further improved response under acceleration. Unlike the GT3, the RS is built on the body and chassis of the 911 Carrera 4 and Turbo, and accordingly has a wider rear track for better cornering characteristics on the track.

Visually, the RS is distinguished by its distinctive colour scheme – bright orange or green with black accents, which traces its roots to the iconic Carrera RS of 1973. The plastic rear deck lid is topped by a wide carbon-fibre rear wing. The front airdam has been fitted with an aero splitter to improve front downforce and provide more cooling air through the radiator.

The European version of the RS is fitted with lightweight plexiglass rear windows and a factory-installed roll cage.

Production of the first generation 997 GT3 RS ended in 2009. An estimated 413 units were delivered to the US and the worldwide production run is estimated to be under 2,000 vehicles.

In August 2009, Porsche announced the second generation of the 997 GT3 RS with an enlarged 3.8-litre engine having a power output of 450 PS (331 kW; 444 hp), a modified suspension, dynamic engine mounts, new titanium sport exhaust, and modified lightweight bodywork.

In April 2011, Porsche announced the third generation of the 997 GT3 RS with an enlarged 4.0-litre engine having a power output of 500 PS (368 kW; 493 hp), Porsche designed the GT3 RS 4.0 using lightweight components such as bucket seats, carbon-fibre bonnet and front wings, and poly carbonate plastic rear windows for weight reduction, while using suspension components from the racing version. Other characteristics include low centre of gravity, a large rear wing and an aerodynamically optimised body. The lateral front air deflection vanes, a first on a production Porsche, increase downforce on the front axle. Aided by a steeply inclined rear wing, aerodynamic forces exert an additional 190 kg, enhancing the 911 GT3 RS 4.0's grip to the tarmac. The GT3 RS 4.0 weighs 1,360 kg (2,998 lb).

==== 997 GT2 ====
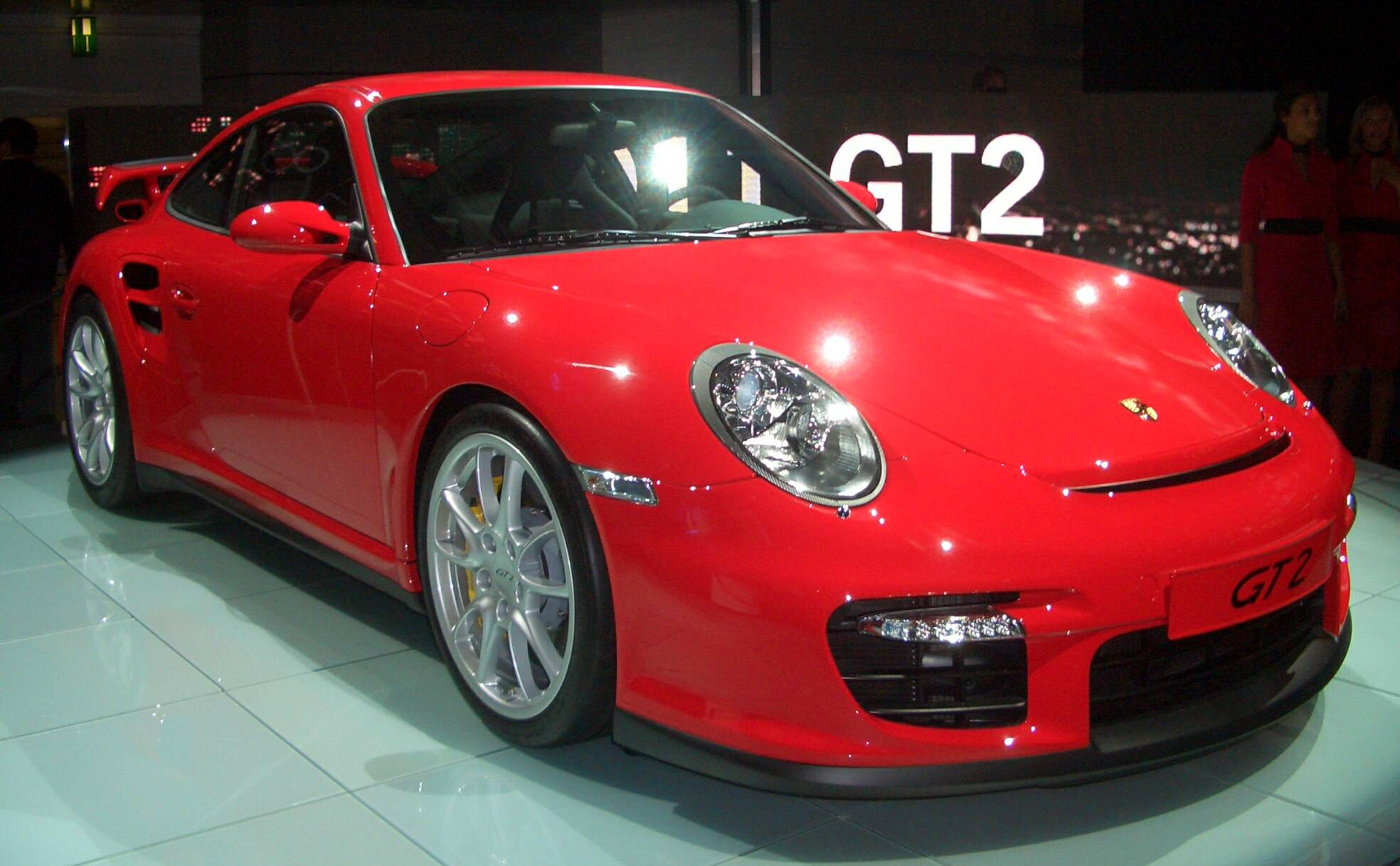
997 GT2

The Type 996 911 GT2 was superseded by the Type 997 GT2 in 2007. The new car was announced on 16 July of that year but was launched during the 62nd Frankfurt Motor Show, held every other year in Frankfurt, Germany. It arrived in dealerships from November 2007.

The 997 GT2 has a twin-turbocharged 3.6-litre flat-6 engine, which generates 530 PS (390 kW; 523 hp) at 6,500 rpm, and 505 lb⋅ft (685 N⋅m) of torque from 2,200 to 4,500 rpm. It has a 6-speed manual transmission and is rear wheel drive. With a curb weight of 1,440 kg (3,175 lb), the 997 GT2 accelerates from 0–97 km/h (0–60 mph) in 3.6 seconds, and from 0 to 161 km/h (100 mph) in 7.4 seconds, and has a top speed of 328 km/h (204 mph). This makes it the first street-legal 911 to exceed 322 km/h (200 mph) barrier, with the exception of the 1998 911 GT1 road car (which is broadly considered not to be a true 911 due to its mid-mounted engine).

Motor Trend tested a 2008 Porsche 911 GT2 and achieved a 0–60 mph (97 km/h) acceleration time of 3.4 seconds, and 11.4 seconds at 127.9 mph (205.8 km/h) for the quarter mile. The GT2 also recorded a braking distance from 60 to 0 mph (97 to 0 km/h) of 98 feet (30 m) and recorded 1.10g lateral grip. The GT2 made an appearance on Top Gear, where it had a lap time of 1:19.5, faster than a Carrera GT by .3 of a second.

Its appearance differs slightly from its sister-car, the 911 (997) Turbo, in a few ways. It does not have fog lights in the front bumper, it has a revised front lip, it has a different rear wing (with two small air scoops on either side), and it has a different rear bumper (now featuring titanium exhaust pipes).

The 997 GT2 is also different from the 997 Turbo in that it is rear-wheel-drive rather than all-wheel-drive.

==== 997 GT2 RS ====
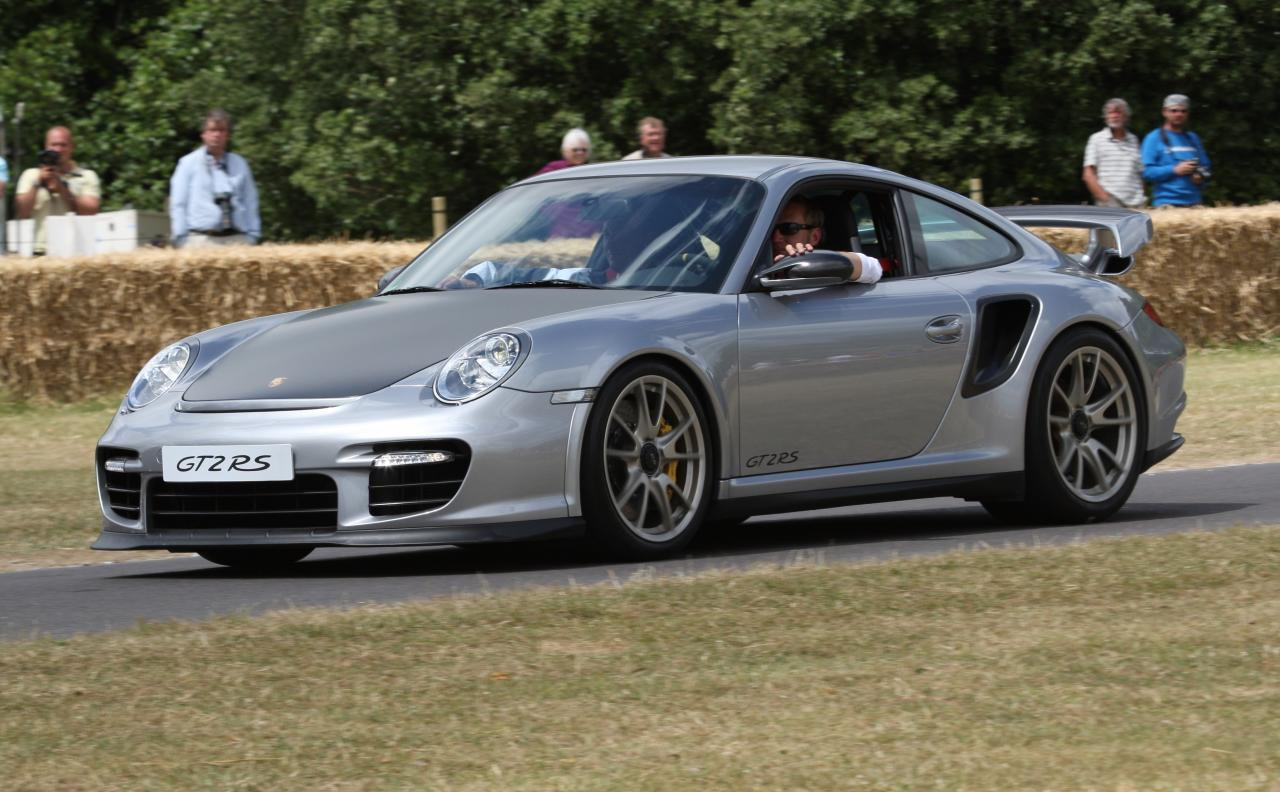
997 GT2 RS

On 4 May 2010, an RS variant was announced to German dealers in Leipzig. The GT2 RS develops 620 PS (456 kW; 612 hp) and 700 N⋅m (516 lb⋅ft) of torque and weighs 70 kg (150 lb) less than the standard GT2, allowing for a top speed of 330 km/h (205 mph) and a 0–100 km/h (0–62 mph) acceleration time of 3.4 seconds. The 997 GT2 RS uses PASM sports suspensions and PSM stability management, with side air intakes without struts. This model is only available in the colors Guards Red, Carrera White, or GT Silver.

==== Sport Classic ====
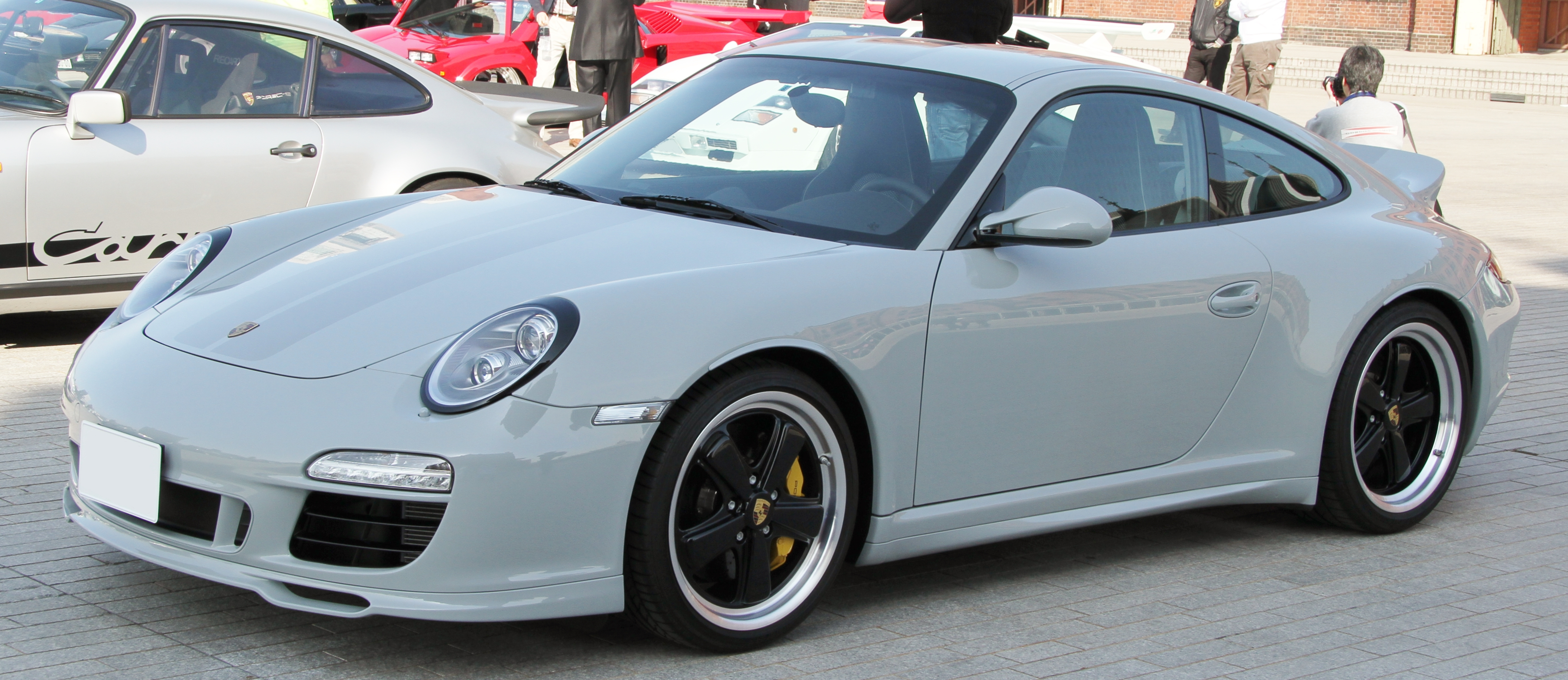
997 Sport Classic

Unveiled at the 2009 Frankfurt Auto Show, the Sport Classic is a limited (250 units—all sold in under 48 hours) version of 911 Carrera S coupé, inspired by the 1973 Carrera RS 2.7. The engine is rated at 408 PS (300 kW; 402 hp) via newly developed resonance intake manifold with 6 vacuum-controlled switching flaps. It includes 6-speed manual transmission, double-dome roof, 44 mm (1.7 in) wider rear fenders, SportDesign front apron with a spoiler lip and a fixed 'duck tail' rear wing (similar to the one found on the 1973 Carrera RS 2.7), PCCB Porsche Ceramic Composite Brakes, 20 mm (0.8 in) lower PASM sports suspension, mechanical rear axle differential, 19-inch black Fuchs wheels, Porsche Exclusive woven leather seats and door panels, dashboard with Espresso Nature natural leather upholstery, and a specially developed Sport Classic Grey body colour.

==== Carrera GTS ====
For the 2011 model year, Porsche introduced the first-ever GTS model for the 911. Designed as a driver's car, the GTS was more powerful than the S, better handling via a bespoke suspension design, and positioned as a more street-friendly alternative to the GT3, Porsche's track-focused 911 variant. The GTS featured race-inspired Centerlock wheels, unique styling including a Sport Design front bumper, special rear bumper, blackout trim, side skirts borrowed from the GT2 model, brushed stainless steel "Carrera GTS" door sills and Alcantara trim. Many GTS' were ordered with the Alcantara delete, instead being built with leather. The GTS was very rare in that it was a rear wheel drive Wide-Body design (44 mm wider than a standard 911), 20 mm lower and offered 408 HP (versus 385 HP for the S) like the similar, limited volume Sport Classic and the Speedster. Porsche built approximately 2,265 total GTS models for the world market, as well as a handful designated as 2012 models. The enthusiastic reception the GTS model received from both the motoring press and consumers convinced Porsche to make the GTS a staple of the 911 line beginning in 2015, with the "type 991" 911 successor.

==== Speedster ====
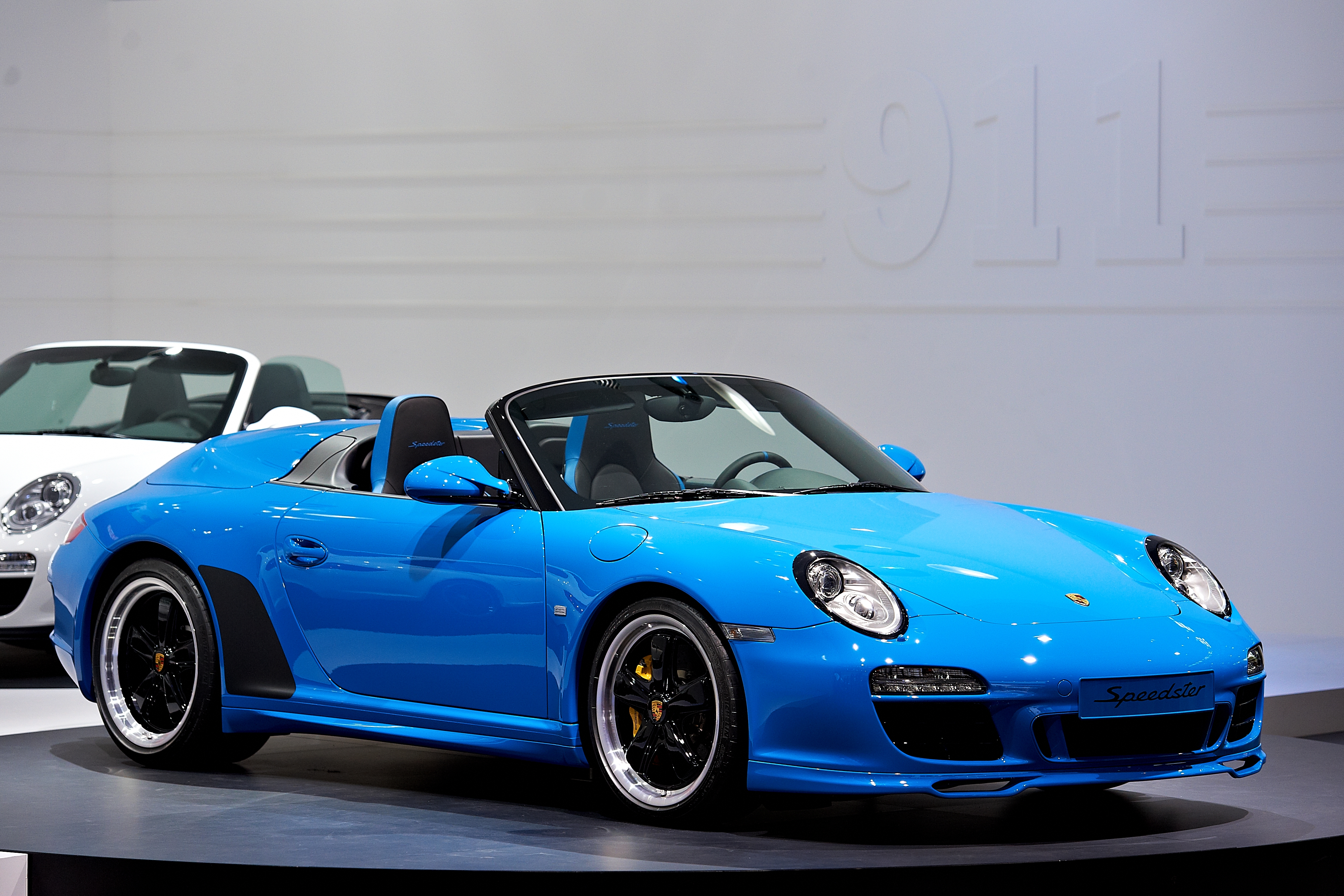
997 Speedster

In 2011, Porsche added a new 911 Speedster in a limited series of only 356 units to the 997 lineage, the number of cars produced recalling the iconic car of the 1950s. It was the third 911 Speedster produced, the other two being from the 930 and 964 generations. The Speedster was powered by the same engine as the Carrera GTS which is rated at 414 PS (304 kW; 408 hp). It accelerated from 0 to 97 km/h (60 mph) in 4.2 seconds and reached a top speed of around 310 km/h (190 mph). Only two colours were offered, Pure Blue (which was developed specifically for the Speedster) and Carrara White. (Paint To Sample versions were produced in very limited numbers and upon special request from "loyal customers".)

The Speedster featured a windscreen 70mm shorter than the standard 997 cabriolet while maintaining the same rake angle.

=== 991 Series (2011–2019) ===
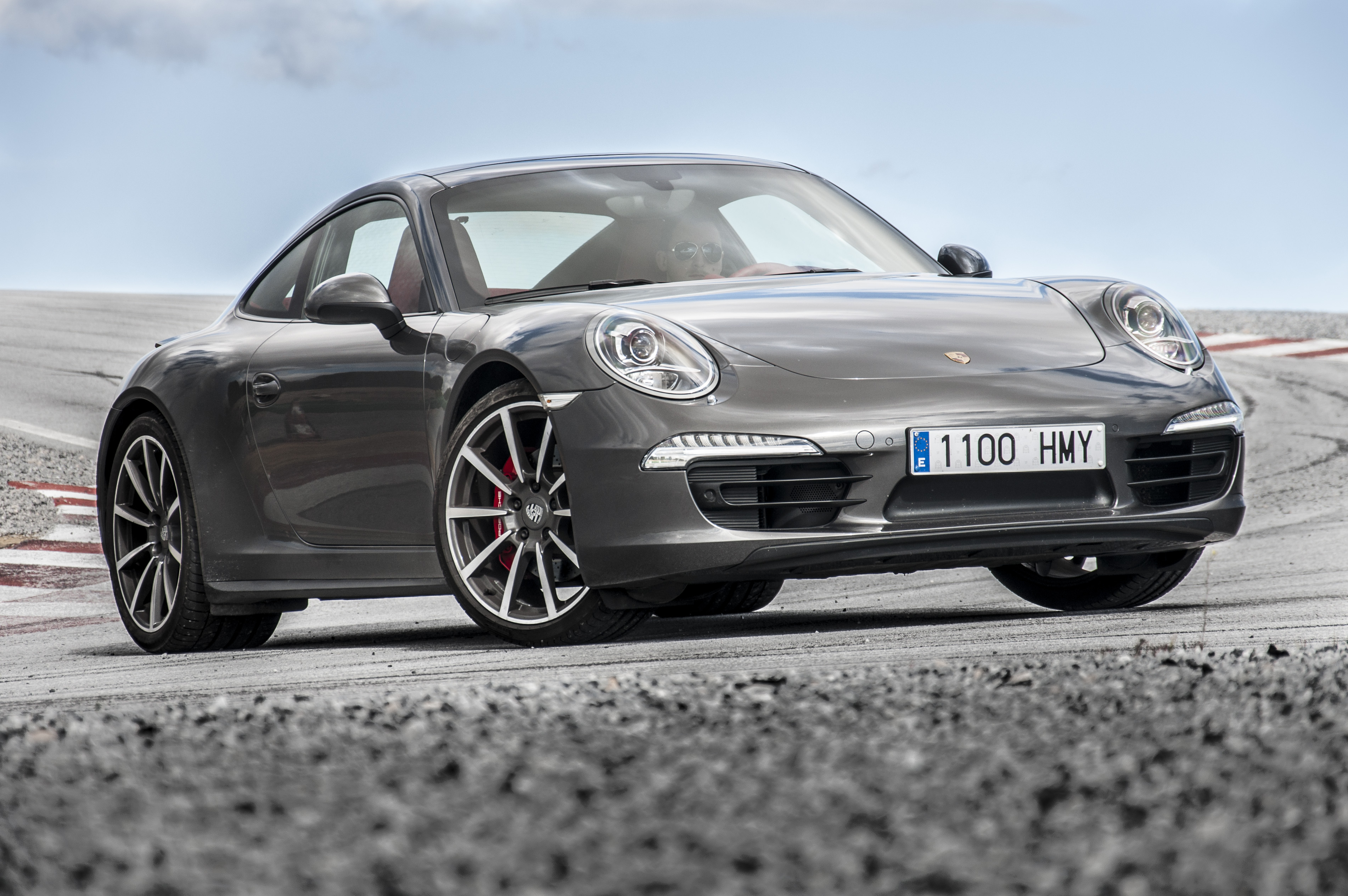
991 Carrera S

The 991 introduced in 2011 for the 2012 model year is an entirely new platform, only the third since the original 911. Porsche revealed basic information on the new Carrera and Carrera S models on 23 August 2011. The Carrera is powered by a 355 PS (261 kW; 350 hp) 3.4-litre engine. The Carrera S features a 3.8-litre engine rated at 406 PS (299 kW; 400 hp). A Power Kit (option X51) is available for the Carrera S, increasing power output to 436 PS (321 kW; 430 hp). The new 991's overall length grows by 56 mm (2.2 in) and wheelbase grows by 99 mm (3.9 in) (now 96.5 in.) Overhangs are trimmed and the rear axle moves rearward at roughly 76 mm (3 in) towards the engine (made possible by new 3-shaft transmissions whose output flanges are moved closer to the engine). There is a wider front track (51 mm (2 in) wider for the Carrera S). The design team for the 991 was headed by Michael Mauer.

At the front, the new 991 has wide-set headlights that are more three-dimensional. The front fender peaks are a bit more prominent, and wedgy directionals now appear to float above the intakes for the twin coolant radiators. The stretched rear 3/4 view has changed the most, with a slightly more voluminous form and thin taillights capped with the protruding lip of the bodywork. The biggest and main change in the interior is the centre console, inspired by the Carrera GT and adopted by the Panamera.

The 991 is the first 911 to use a predominantly aluminium construction. This means that even though the car is larger than the outgoing model, it is still up to 50 kilograms (110 lb) lighter. The reduced weight and increased power means that both the Carrera and Carrera S are appreciably faster than the outgoing models. The 0–97 km/h (0–60 mph) acceleration time for the manual transmission cars are 4.6 seconds for the Carrera and 4.3 seconds for the Carrera S. When equipped with the PDK transmission, the two 991 models can accelerate from 0–97 km/h (0–60 mph) in 4.4 seconds and 4.1 seconds. With the optional sports chrono package, available for the cars with the PDK transmission, the 991 Carrera can accelerate from 0–97 km/h (0–60 mph) in as little as 4.2 seconds and the Carrera S can do the same in 3.9 seconds.

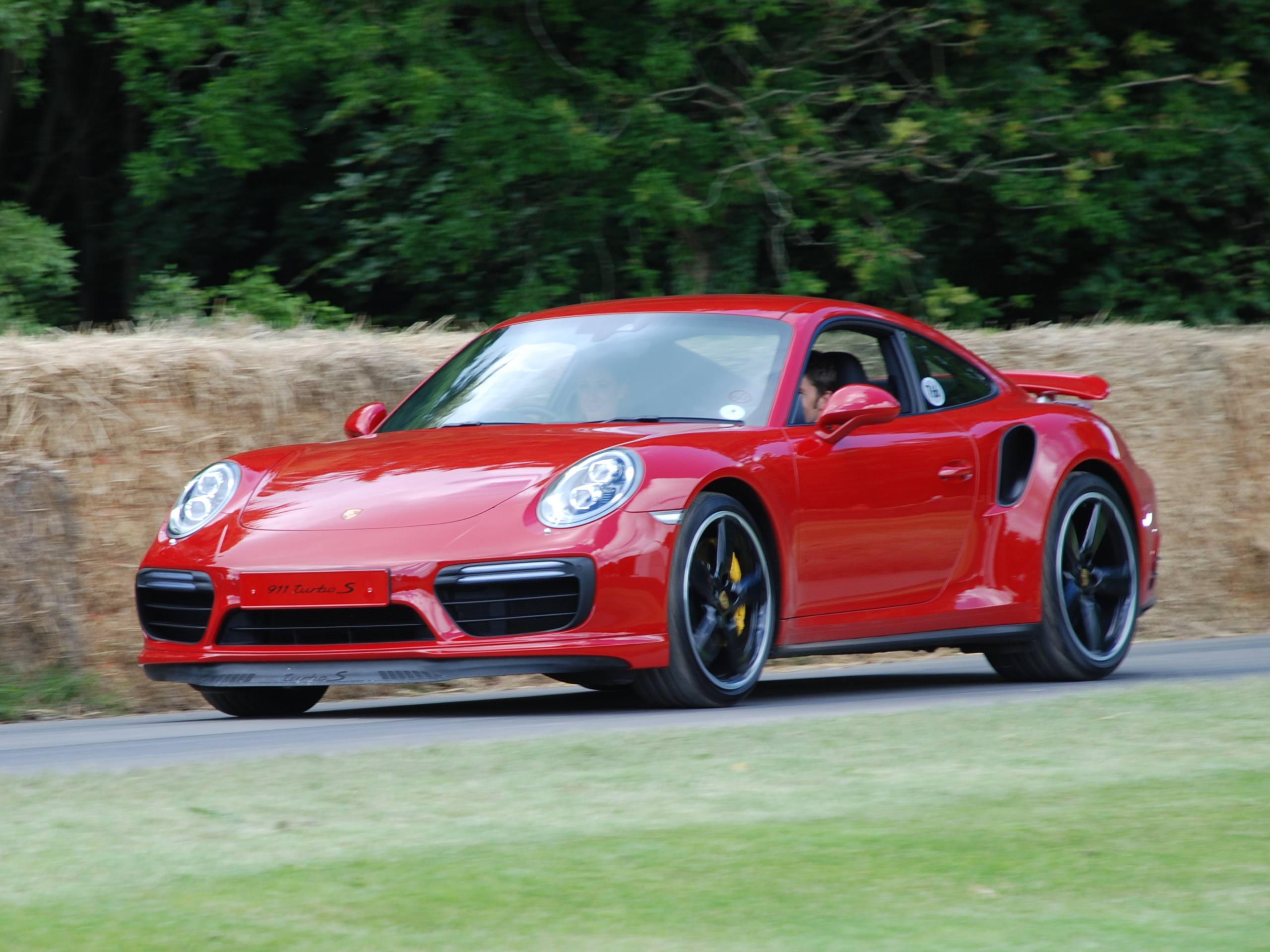
Porsche 991 Turbo S

Apart from the reworked PDK transmission, the new 991 is also equipped with an industry-first 7-speed manual transmission. On vehicles produced in late 2012 (2013 model year) Rev Matching is available on the 7-speed manual transmission when equipped with the Sport Chrono package. Rev-Matching is a new feature with the manual transmission that blips the throttle during downshifts (if in Sport Plus mode). Also, the 7th gear cannot be engaged unless the car is already in 5th or 6th gear.

One of Porsche's primary objectives with the new model was to improve fuel economy as well as increase performance. In order to meet these objectives, Porsche introduced a number of new technologies in the 911. One of the most controversial of these is the introduction of electromechanical power steering instead of the previous hydraulic steering. This steering helps reduce fuel consumption, but some enthusiasts feel that the precise steering feedback for which the 911 is famous is reduced with the new system. The cars also feature an engine stop/start system that turns the engine off at red lights, as well as a coasting system that allows the engine to idle while maintaining speed on downhill gradients on highways. This allows for up to a 16% reduction in fuel consumption and emissions over the outgoing models.

The new cars also have a number of technologies aimed at improving handling. The cars include a torque vectoring system (standard on the Carrera S and optional on the Carrera) which brakes the inner wheel of the car when going into turns. This helps the car to turn in quicker and with more precision. The cars also feature hydraulic engine mounts (which help reduce the inertia of the engine when going into turns) as part of the optional sports chrono package. Active suspension management is standard on the Carrera S and optional on the Carrera. This helps improve ride quality on straights while stiffening the suspension during aggressive driving. The new 991 is also equipped with a new feature called Porsche Dynamic Chassis Control (PDCC). Porsche claims that this new feature alone has shaved 4 seconds off the standard car's lap time around the Nürburgring. PDCC helps the car corner flat and is said to improve high-speed directional stability and outright lateral body control, but according to several reviews, the car is more prone to understeer when equipped with this new technology.

In January 2013, Porsche introduced the all-wheel-drive variants of the Carrera models. The '4' and '4S' models are distinguishable by wider tyres, marginally wider rear body-work and a red-reflector strip that sits in between the tail-lights. The 4 and 4S models are equipped with an all-new variable all-wheel-drive system that sends power to the front wheels only when needed, giving the driver a sense of being in a rear-wheel-drive 911.

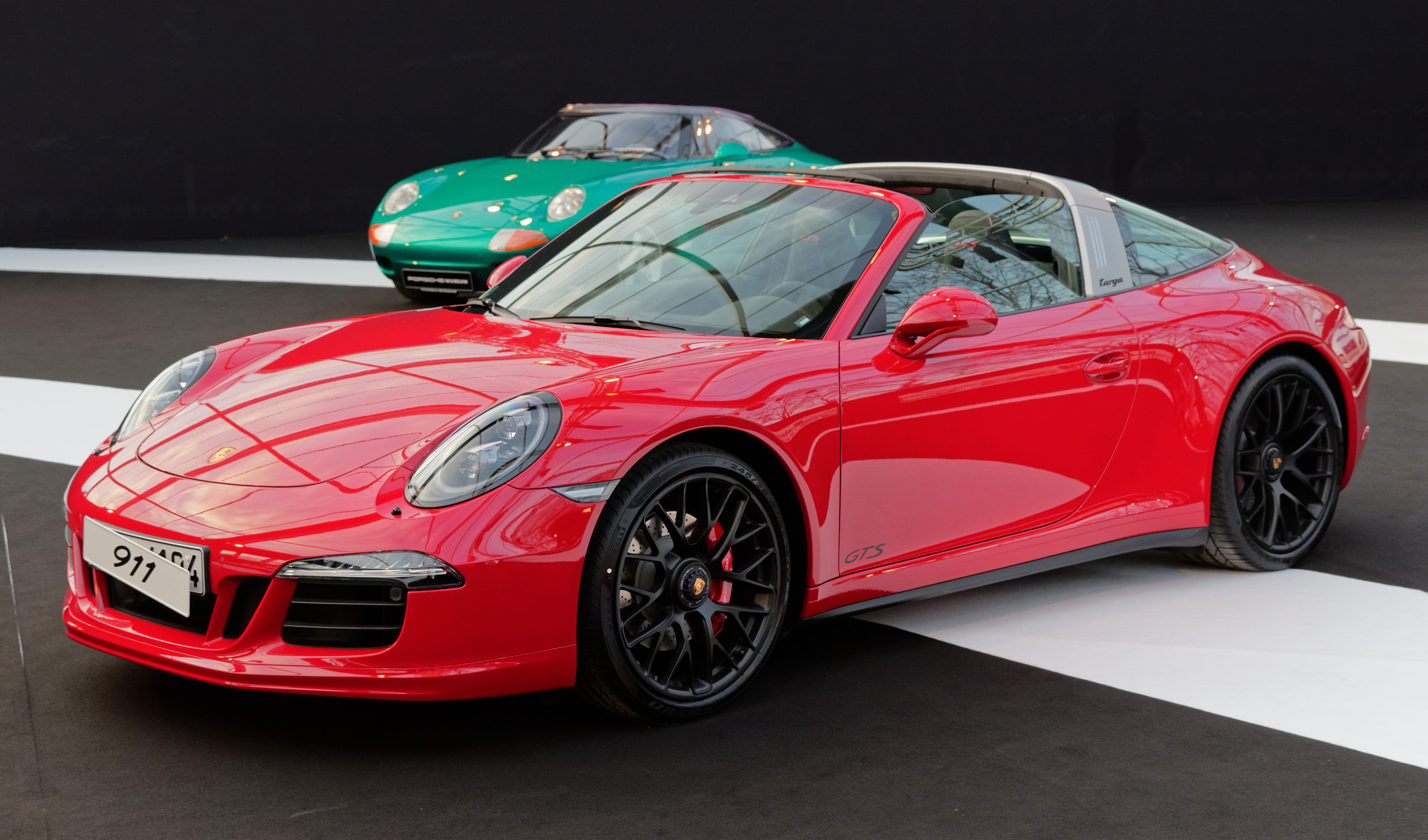
The 991 Targa features an all-new electronically operated roof mechanism which allows it to have the original Targa design.

In May 2013, Porsche announced changes to the model year 2014 911 Turbo and Turbo S models, increasing their power to 520 PS (382 kW; 513 hp) on the 'Turbo', and 560 PS (412 kW; 552 hp) on the 'Turbo S', giving them a 0–97 km/h acceleration time of 3.2 and 2.9 seconds, respectively. A rear-wheel steering system has also been incorporated on the Turbo models that steers the rear wheels in the opposite direction at low speeds or the same direction at high speeds to improve handling. During low-speed maneuvers, this has the virtual effect of shortening the wheelbase, while at high speeds, it is virtually extending the wheelbase for higher driving stability and agility.

In January 2014, Porsche introduced the new model year 2015 Targa 4 and Targa 4S models. These new models come equipped with an all-new roof technology with the original Targa design, now with an all-electric cabriolet roof along with the B-pillar and the glass 'dome' at the rear.

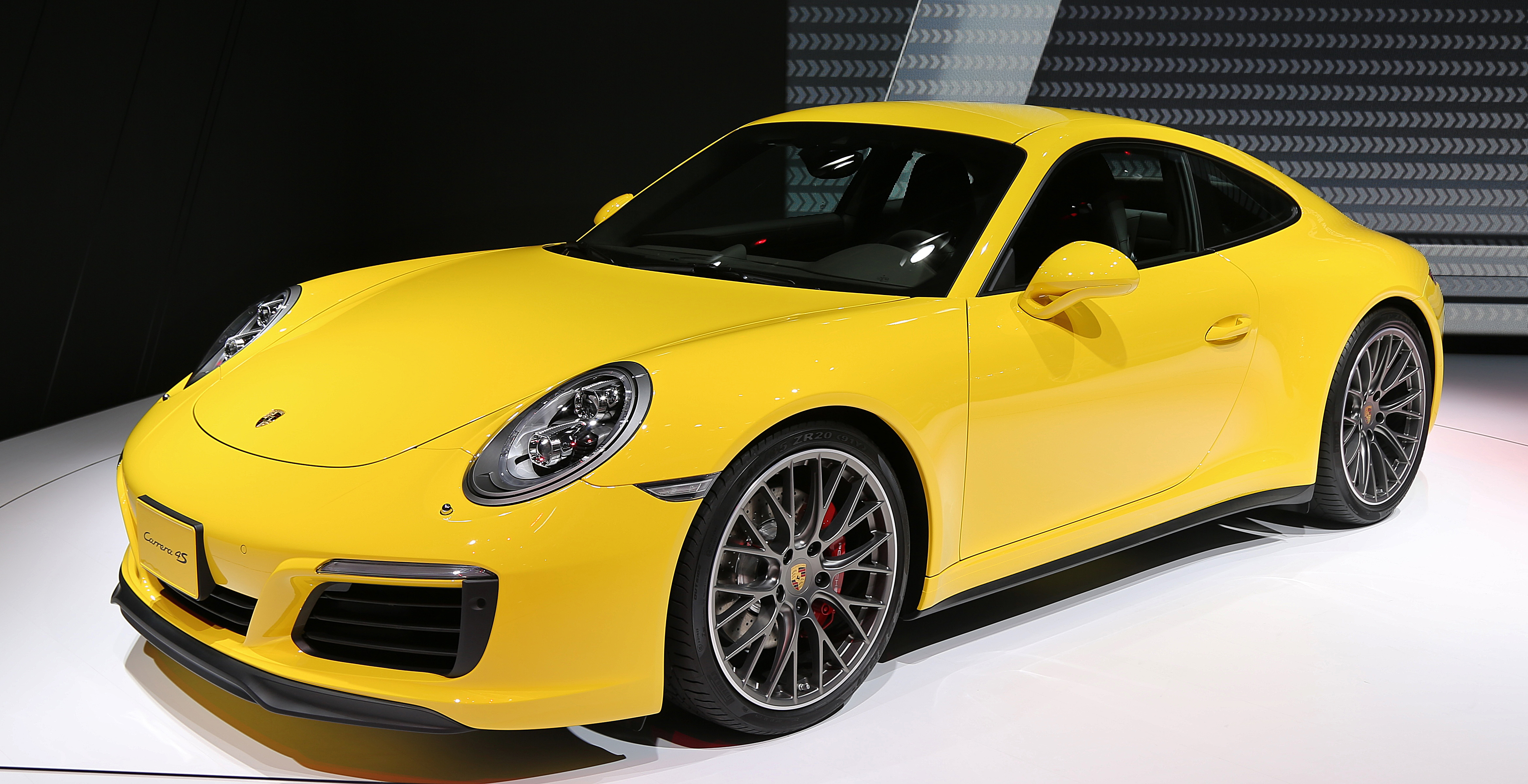
Porsche 991 (post face-lift)

In September 2015, Porsche introduced the second generation of 991 Carrera models at the Frankfurt Motor Show. Both Carrera and Carrera S models break with previous tradition by featuring a 3.0-litre turbocharged 6-cylinder boxer engine, marking the first time that a forced induction engine has been fitted to the base models within the 911 range.

==== 991 GT3 ====
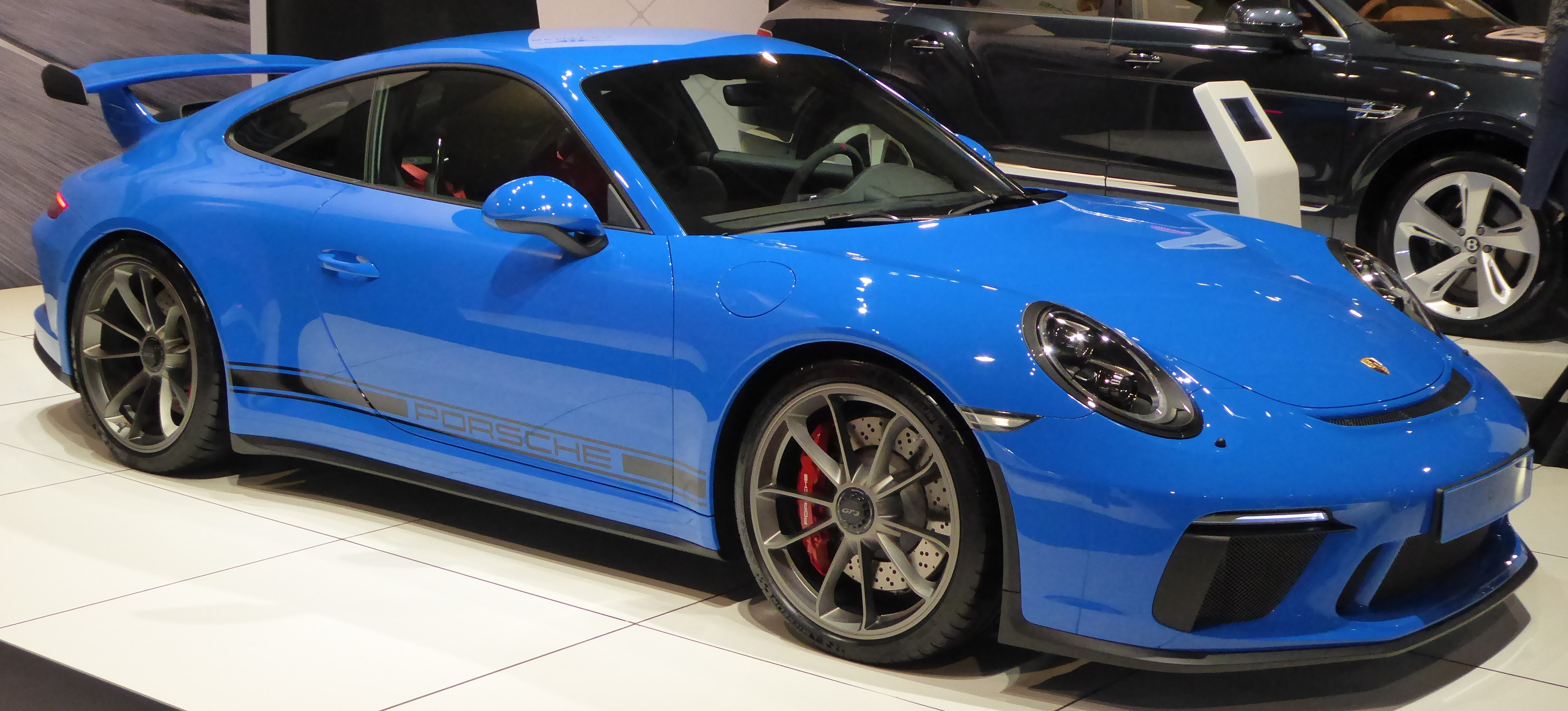
Porsche 991 GT3

Porsche introduced the 991 GT3 at the Geneva Motor Show in 2013. The 991 GT3 features a new 3.8-litre direct fuel injection (DFI) flat-six engine developing 475 PS (349 kW; 469 hp) at 8,250 rpm, a Porsche Doppelkupplung (PDK) double-clutch gearbox and rear-wheel steering. The engine is based on the unit fitted in the 991 Carrera S, but shares only a few common parts. All other components, particularly the crankshaft and valve train, were specially adapted or developed for the 991 GT3. The dual-clutch gearbox is another feature specially developed for the 991 GT3, based on sequential manual transmissions used in racing cars. The 911 GT3 is claimed to be able to accelerate from 0–97 km/h (60 mph) in 3.2 seconds or less, and the quarter mile in 11.2 seconds at 203 km/h (126 mph). The GT3 has a claimed top speed of 315 km/h (196 mph).

Porsche unveiled the facelifted 991.2 GT3 at the 2017 Geneva Motor Show. Extensive changes were made to the engine allowing a 9,000 rpm redline from the 4.0-litre flat-six engine. Porsche's focus was on reducing internal friction to improve throttle response. Compared to the 991.1, the rear spoiler is higher and located further back to be more effective. There is a new front spoiler and changes to the rear suspension. The 991.2 GT3 brought back the choice between a manual transmission or PDK dual-clutch transmission. A touring version was also introduced which comes standard with the comfort package and the manual transmission along with the deletion of the fixed rear wing and employing an electronically operated rear wing instead.

==== 991 GT3 RS ====
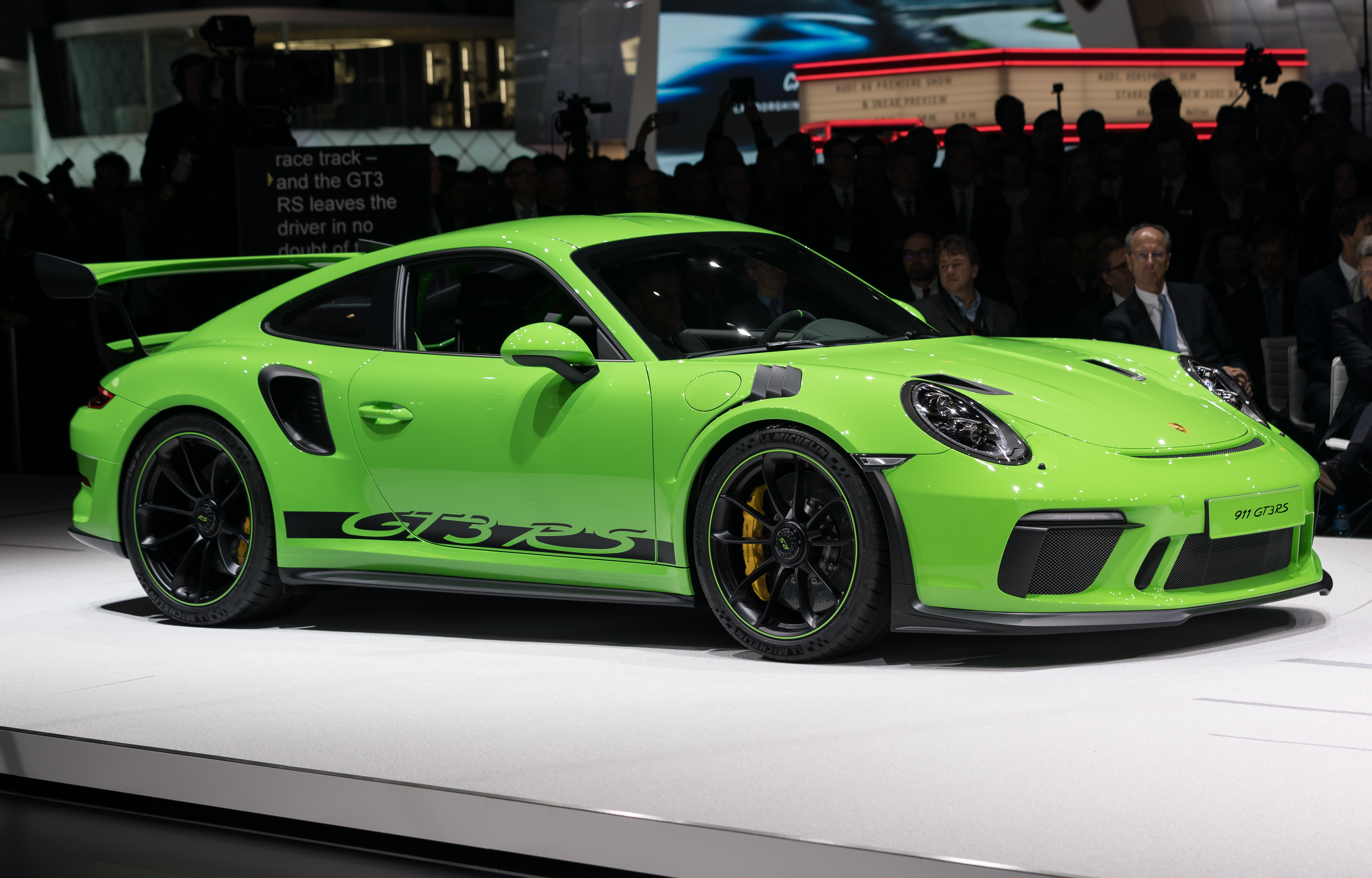
Porsche 991 GT3 RS

Porsche launched the Renn Sport version of the 911 GT3 at the Geneva Motor Show in 2015. Compared to the 911 GT3, the front fenders are now equipped with louvers above the wheels and the rear fenders now include Turbo-like intakes, rather than an intake below the rear wing. The roof is made from magnesium. The interior includes full bucket seats (based on the carbon seats of the 918 Spyder), carbon-fibre inserts, lightweight door handles and the Club Sport Package as standard (a bolted-on roll cage behind the front seats, preparation for a battery master switch, and a six-point safety harness for the driver and fire extinguisher with mounting bracket). The 3.8-litre unit found in the previous 997 GT3 is replaced with a 4.0-litre unit that has a power output of 500 PS (368 kW; 493 hp) and 460 N⋅m (339 lb⋅ft) of torque. The transmission is PDK only. The car accelerates from 0–100 km/h (62 mph) in 3.4 seconds (0.6 seconds quicker than the 997 GT3 RS 4.0) and 0–200 km/h (124 mph) in 10.9 seconds. The 991 GT3 RS also comes with functions such as declutching by "paddle neutral" — comparable to pressing the clutch with a conventional manual gearbox – and a Pit Speed limiter button. As with the 911 GT3, a rear-axle steering and Porsche Torque Vectoring Plus with fully variable rear axle differential lock are available as standard.

In February 2018, Porsche introduced a facelifted GT3 RS model to continue their updates for the 991 generation of the 911. Changes include a new engine similar to the GT3 and RSR models with a 9,000 rpm redline and a 20 PS (15 kW; 20 hp) and 10 N⋅m (7.4 lb⋅ft) increase over the outgoing model, NACA ducts for brake cooling, modified front fascia (similar to the 991.2 GT3), side skits and rear wing (similar to the GT2 RS) for increased downforce, ball joints on all suspension links, front helper springs, lightweight glass for the rear and rear-side windows and a newly developed tyre compound. A Weissach package was available that included additional carbon fibre body and interior parts as well as magnesium wheels and stiffer suspension settings is available as an option.

==== 911 R ====
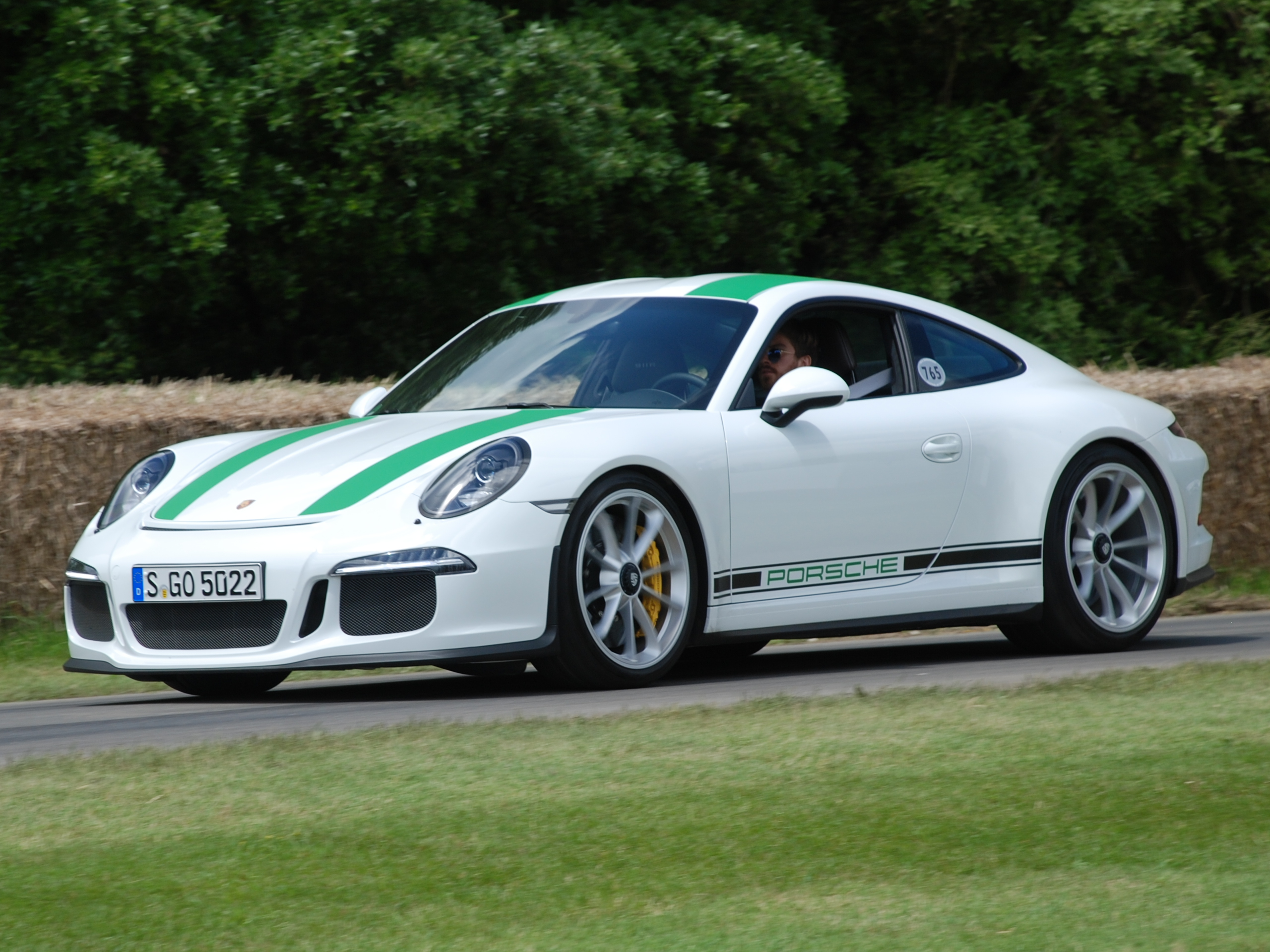
Porsche 911 R

In 2016, Porsche unveiled a limited production 911 R based on the GT3 RS. Production was limited to 991 units worldwide. The Porsche 911 R features a rear-engine, 4.0 L boxer 6-cylinder engine producing 500 PS (368 kW) at 8,250 rpm and 460 N⋅m (339 lb⋅ft) at 6,250 rpm. It also has a dry-sump lubrication system and a 12.9:1 compression ratio. It has an overall weight of 1,370 kg (3,020 lb), a high-revving 4.0 L six-cylinder naturally aspirated engine from the 991 GT3 RS, and a six-speed manual transmission, while air conditioning and audio systems are removable options to save weight. The car accelerates from 0–97 km/h (0–60 mph) in 3.7 seconds and has a top speed of 320 km/h (200 mph).

==== 991 GT2 RS ====
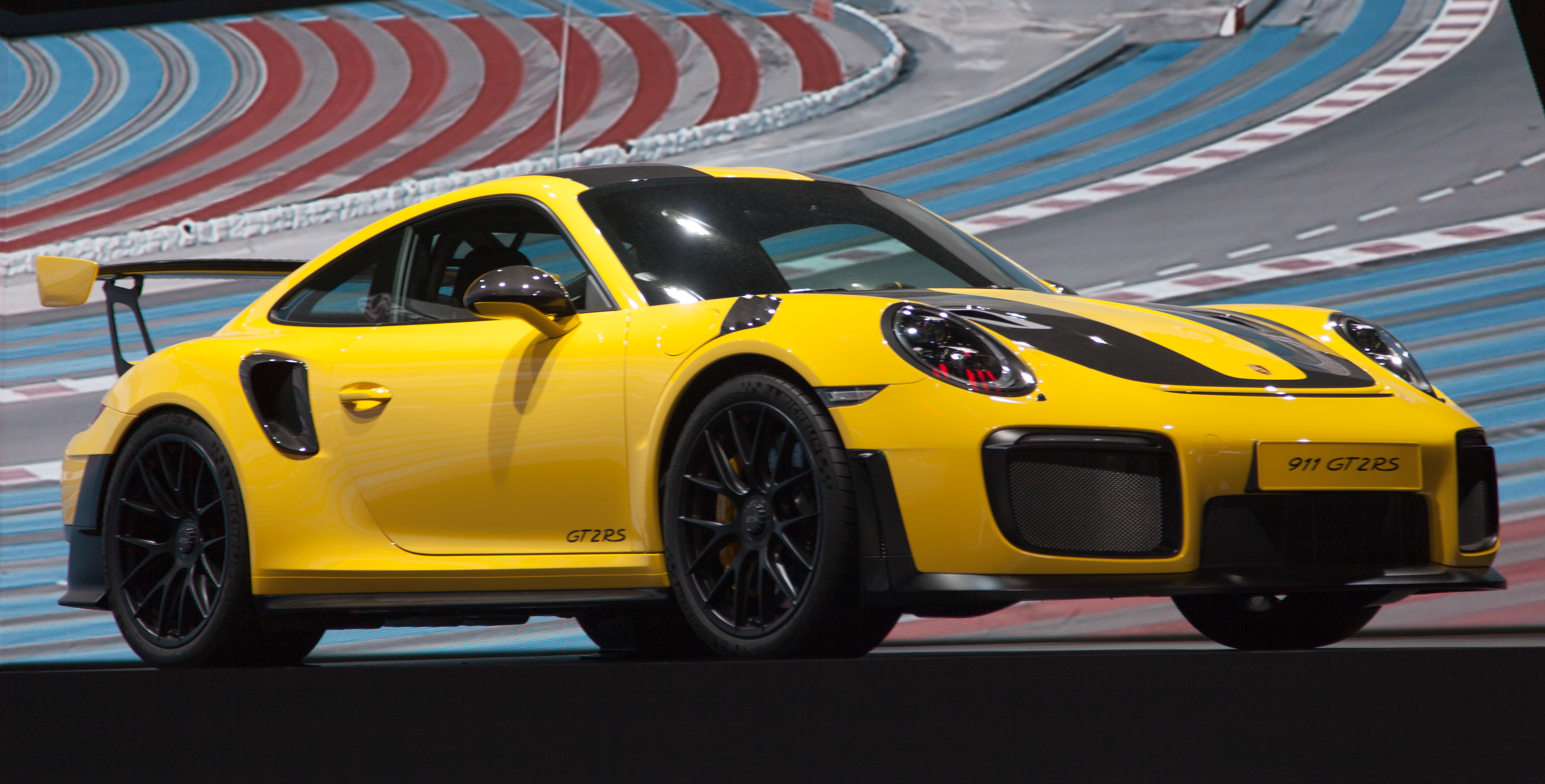
Porsche 991 GT2 RS

The high-performance GT2 version made a return to the 991 lineage but now as an RS variant only with no standard variant being produced, unlike the previous generations. It was initially unveiled at the 2017 E3 along with the announcement of the Forza Motorsport 7.

The car was officially unveiled at the 2017 Goodwood Festival of Speed along with the introduction of the 911 Turbo S Exclusive Series. The 991 GT2 RS is powered by a 3.8 L twin-turbocharged flat-6 engine that produces a maximum power of 700 PS (515 kW; 690 hp) at 7,000 rpm and 750 N⋅m (550 lb⋅ft) of torque, making it the most powerful 911 ever built. Unlike the previous GT2 versions, this car is fitted with a 7-speed PDK transmission to handle the excessive torque produced from the engine. Porsche claims that this car will accelerate from 0 to 60 mph (97 km/h) in 2.7 seconds, and has a top speed of 340 km/h (210 mph).

The car has a roof made of magnesium, front lid, front and rear spoilers and boot lid made of carbon, front and rear apron made of lightweight polyurethane, rear and side windows made of polycarbonate and features a titanium exhaust system. Porsche claims that the car will have a wet weight of 1,470 kg (3,241 lb).

A Weissach package option is available, which reduces the weight by 30 kg (66 lb), through the use of additional carbon-fiber and titanium parts. These include the roof, the anti-roll bars and the coupling rods on both axles made out of carbon-fiber while the package also includes a set of light-weight magnesium wheels.

==== Speedster (2019) ====
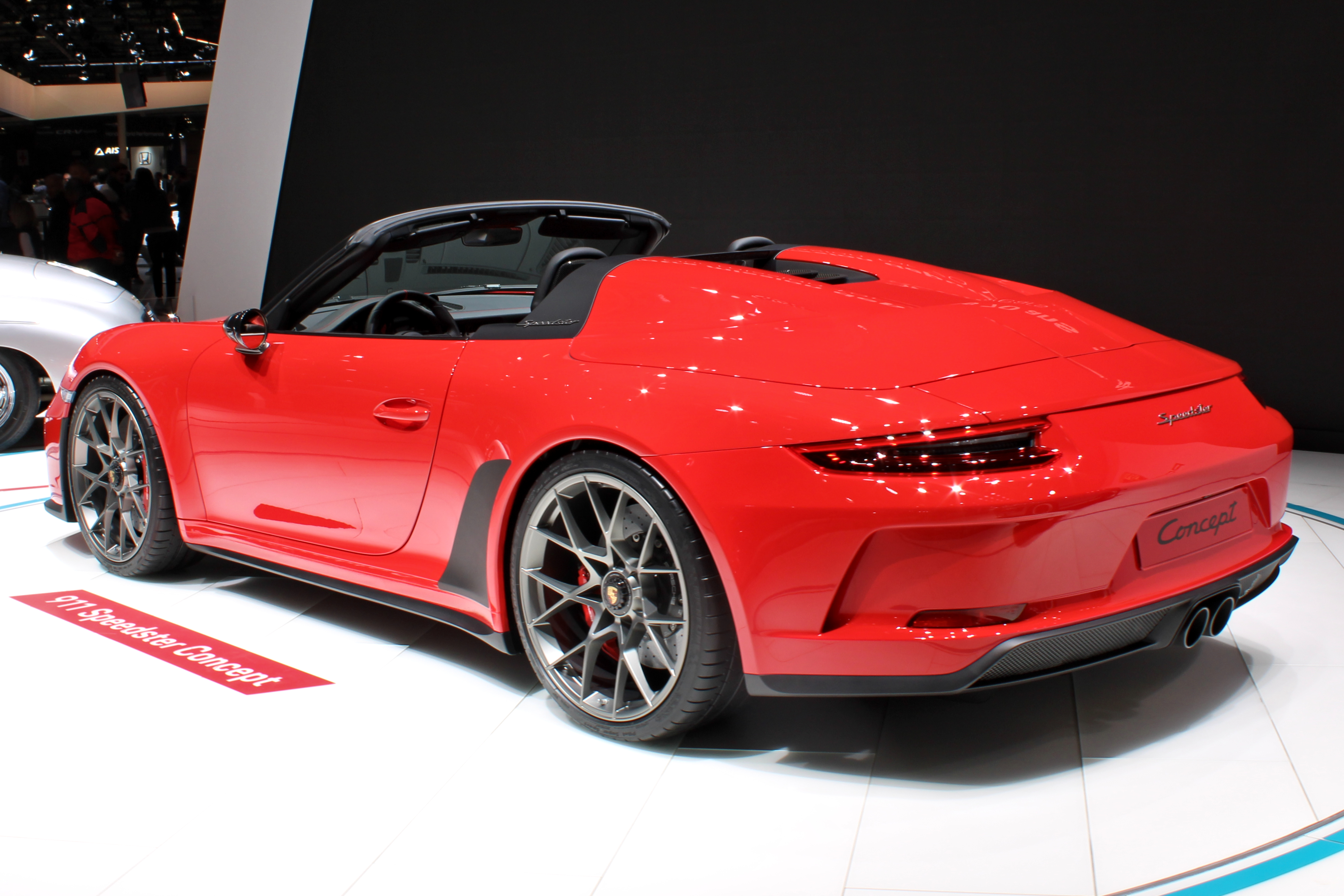
Porsche 911 Speedster Concept

At the 2018 Paris Motor Show held in October on the occasion of the 70th-anniversary celebration of the marque, Porsche unveiled the Speedster variant of the 991 generation for the 911, as a concept. Utilising the chassis of the GT3 and the body shell of the Carrera 4 Cabriolet, the Speedster includes the GT3's 4.0-litre naturally aspirated Flat-6 engine generating a maximum power output of 500 PS (368 kW; 493 hp) and having a red-line of 9,000 rpm coupled with a 6-speed manual transmission and titanium exhaust system which are claimed to be 4 kg (9 lb) lighter than the 7-speed manual transmission found on the standard 991 models. The car also features the signature "hump" shaped double-bubble roof cover along with a shorter windshield frame, side window glass and the analogue roof folding mechanism retaining the "Talbot" wing mirrors and the central fuel cap from the 911 Speedster concept unveiled earlier at the Goodwood Festival of Speed harking back to its use on the 356 Speedster. Other highlights include a leather interior with perforated seats, red tinted daytime running lights, carbon fibre fenders, engine cover and hood and stone guards. Production began in the first half of 2019 and be limited to 1,948 units in honour of the year in which the 356 "Number 1" gained its operating license. The final production version of the Speedster was unveiled at the 2019 New York Auto Show in April and dropped the "Talbot" wing mirrors in favour of standard 991 wing mirrors. The speedster was available for sale in May 2019.

=== 992 Series (2019–present) ===
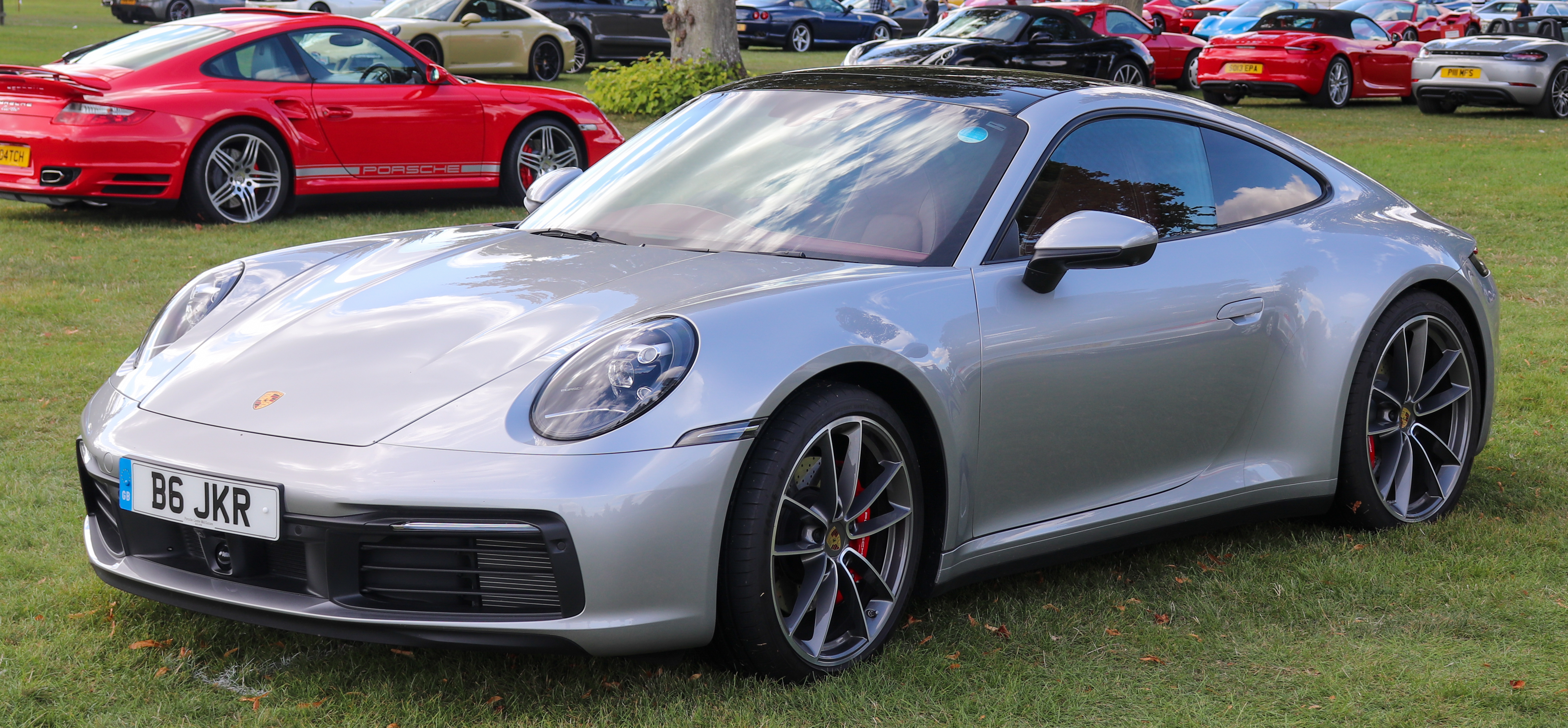
Porsche 992

The 2019 version of the 911, under the internal name Type 992, made its debut at the 2018 Los Angeles Auto Show. During the actual debut, a presentation of the history of the 911 series was shown, along with a lineup of 911s from different generations.

On 30 July 2019, Porsche started marketing the non 'S' model of the new 992. The exterior is almost identical to the 991 'S' models with the exception of having 19" wheels at the front and 20" wheels at the rear, compared to the 'S' Models 20" front and 21" rear. As of November 2022, Porsche offers the Carrera and Carrera S versions (offered with all-wheel-drive 4 and 4S versions along with the standard rear-wheel-drive version in coupe, targa, and convertible body styles), Carrera T (only offered in the coupe body style with rear-wheel-drive), Carrera GTS versions (offered in coupe, convertible, and targa body styles with the optional all-wheel-drive available), the GT3 and GT3 RS (only offered in the coupe body style and rear-wheel-drive), the Turbo and the flagship Turbo S (only offered in coupe and convertible body styles with only all-wheel-drive).

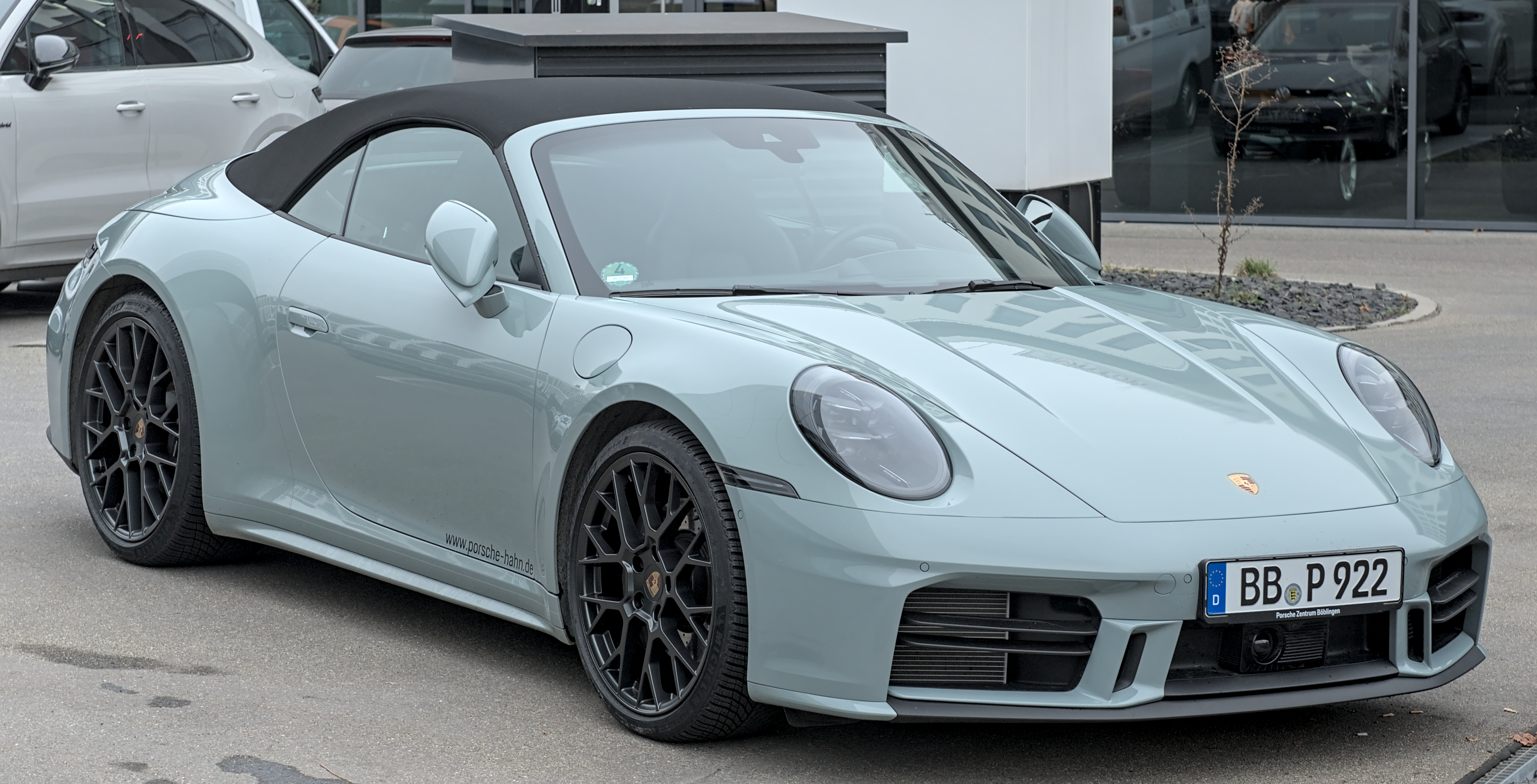
Porsche 911 992.2

On 28 May 2024, Porsche introduced the 992.2 facelift. The 992.2 introduced a hybrid model and a new 3.6-litre twin-turbo flat-six for higher performance variants. The standard 911 continues to use the 3.0-litre twin-turbo flat-six while higher trims such as the GTS and Turbo adopts the new 3.6-litre engine and uses a new hybrid drive-train. The battery in the 992.2 uses a 400 volt electrical system that produces around 80–90 hp (60–67 kW) and integrates a 2 kWh battery. This hybrid system is targeted to reduce turbo lag and improve low end torque.

The 992.2 GT3 and GT3 RS also introduce some changes such as a new double wishbone suspension derived from Porsche’s motorsport programs, revised aerodynamics with a redesigned front diffuser and underbody guides. It also includes availability of the Weissach Package on the base GT3; featuring lightweight carbon-fibre components and magnesium wheels.

== 911 GT1 ==
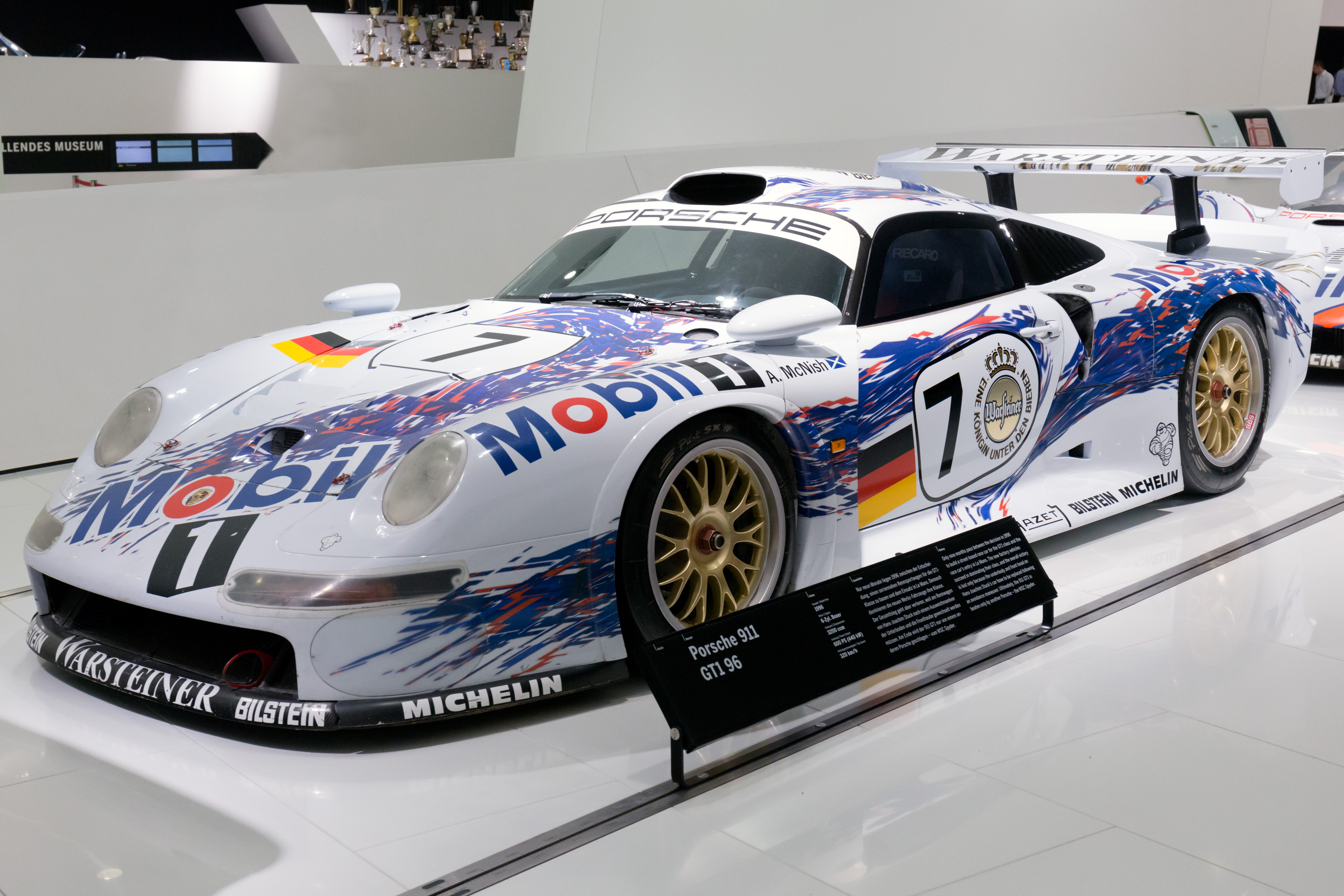
Porsche 911 GT1 on display at the Porsche Museum

The Porsche 911 GT1 is a race car that was developed in 1996 for the GT1 class in the 24 Hours of Le Mans. In order to qualify for GT racing, 25 road-going models were built to achieve type homologation. The engine in the GT1 is rated at 608 PS (447 kW; 600 hp) and accelerated from 0 to 97 km/h (0 to 60 mph) in 3.3 seconds. The top speed stood at 330 km/h (205 mph). The road version was rated at 544 PS (400 kW; 537 hp). Both the road and race cars carried the same twin-turbocharged engine as used in the 962, and the race car was a match for the then-dominant McLaren F1 GTRs. A redeveloped version of the 911 GT1 race car was later built, winning outright at the 1998 24 Hours of Le Mans. The car is not considered to be a real 911, as it is derived from the 962 with the 993 and later the 996 911's front section. It was the most powerful and fastest road-going Porsche until the introduction of the Carrera GT in 2004.

== Awards ==
In 1999, the 911 placed fifth in the Global Automotive Elections Foundation's Car of the Century competition, trailing mass market cars: Ford Model T, BMC Mini, Citroën DS, and Volkswagen Beetle.

In 2004, Sports Car International named the 911 number three on the list of Top Sports Cars of the 1960s, the Carrera RS number seven on the list of Top Sports Cars of the 1970s, and the 911 Carrera number seven on the list of Top Sports Cars of the 1980s. In addition, the 911 was voted Number 2 on Automobile Magazine's list of the "100 Coolest Cars". Motor Trend chose the Porsche 911 Carrera S as its Best Driver's Car for 2012. It also won "World Performance Car Of The Year" in 2014.

In 2015, Car and Driver named the Porsche 911 "the best premium sports car on the market".
