= Porsche 944 =

Mid level sports car (1982–1991)

- 1989 944 Turbo (951) US-spec

Overview
- Manufacturer: Porsche AG
- Production: 1982–1991
- Assembly: Germany: Neckarsulm, Stuttgart
- Designer: Harm Lagaay (Porsche AG)

Body and chassis
- Class: Sports car (S)
- Body style: 2-door coupé; 2-door convertible
- Layout: Front-engine, rear-wheel-drive layout

Powertrain
- Engine: 2.5 L M44/40 I4; 2.5 L M44/51, M44/52 turbo I4; 2.7 L M44/12 I4; 3.0 L M44/41 I4
- Transmission: 3-speed automatic; 5-speed manual

Dimensions
- Wheelbase: 2,400 mm (94.5 in)
- Length: 1986–1988: 4,318 mm (170.0 in); Turbo & S2: 4,288 mm (168.8 in); 1989–1991: 4,290 mm (168.9 in)
- Width: 1,735 mm (68.3 in)
- Height: 1,275 mm (50.2 in)
- Curb weight: Pre-1988: 1,180 kg (2,601 lb); 1988 onwards: 1,330 kg (2,932 lb); 1986 Turbo models: 1,360 kg (2,998 lb); 1987 onwards (Turbo models): 1,416 kg (3,122 lb); Note: some figures are dry weight

Chronology
- Predecessor: Porsche 924
- Successor: Porsche 968

The Porsche 944 is a two-door sports car that was manufactured and marketed by Porsche from 1982 until 1991. A front-engine, rear-wheel drive model based on the platform of the 924, the 944 was available in coupé or cabriolet body styles, with either naturally aspirated or turbocharged engines. With over 163,000 cars produced, the 944 was the most successful sports car in Porsche's history until the introductions of the Boxster and 997 Carrera.

Extensive design revisions for the 1992 model year prompted Porsche to drop the 944 nameplate and rebrand the vehicle as the 968.

== History ==
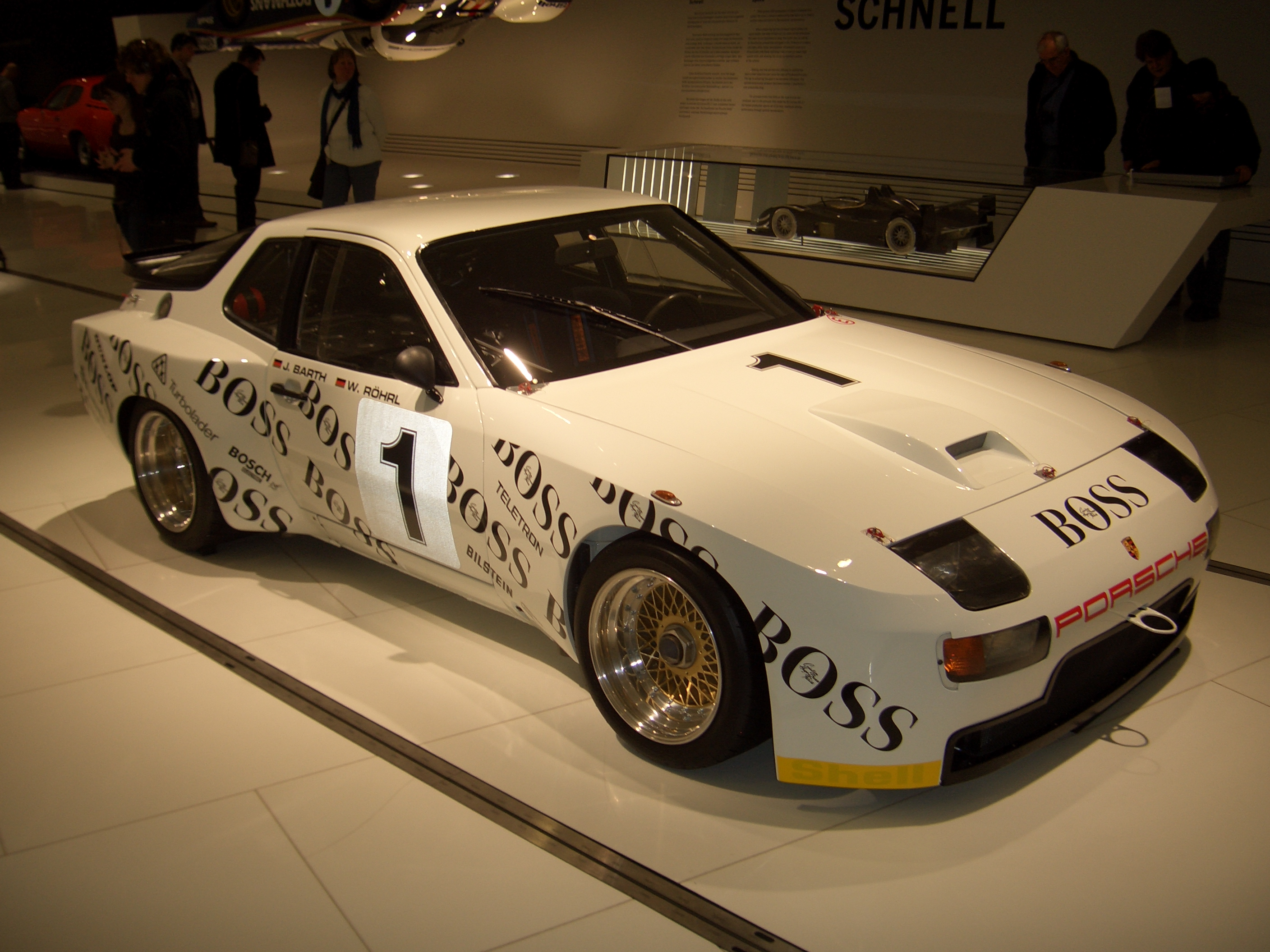

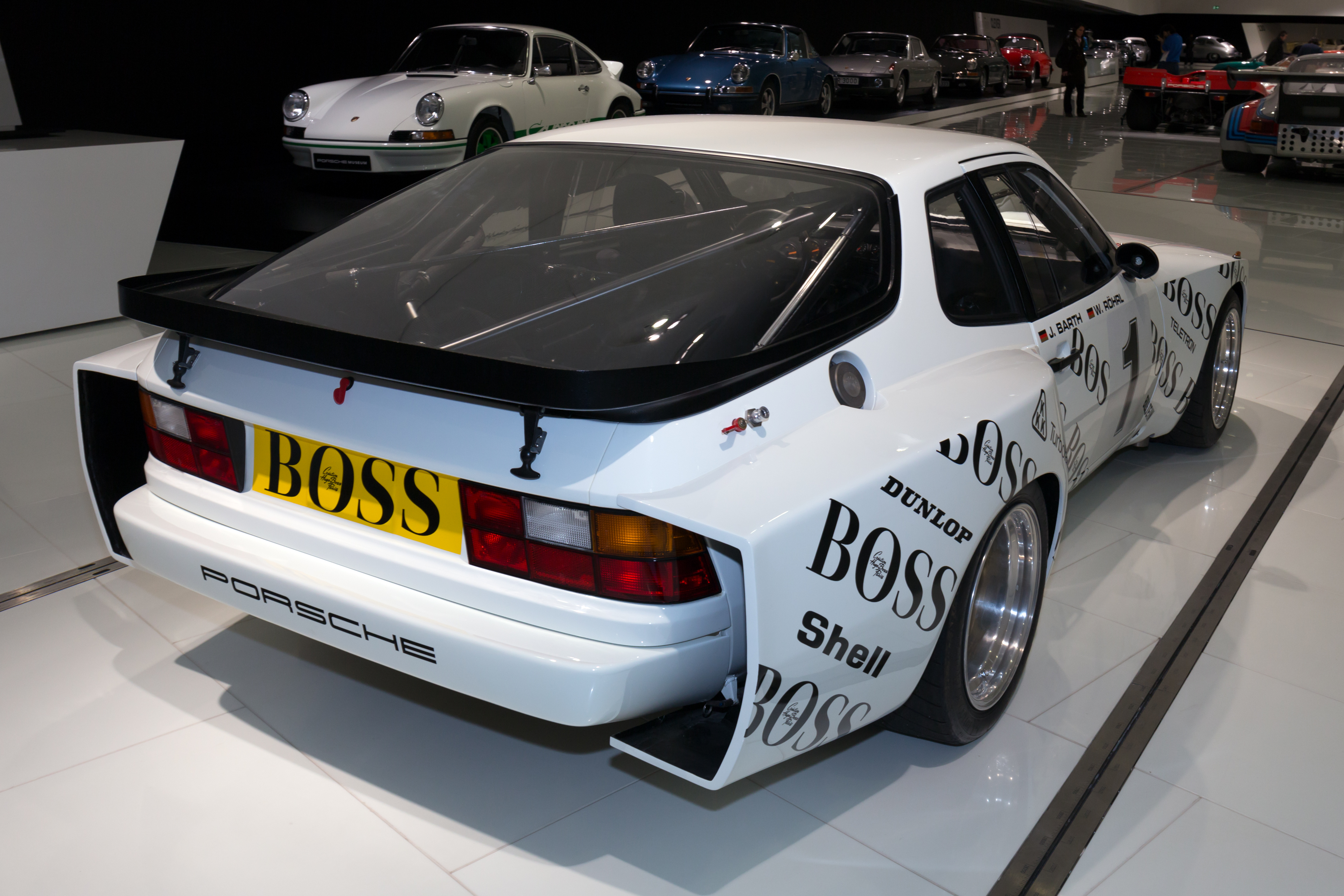
The 924 GTP LeMans served as the basis for the mid-level 944

The 924 had originally been a project of VW-Porsche, a joint Porsche/Volkswagen company incorporated to develop and produce the 914 which was sold in Europe badged as both a Porsche and a Volkswagen. In 1972, a replacement for the Volkswagen version of the 914, code named EA-425 began development. The model was to be sold as an Audi as part of the VW-Audi-Porsche marketing arrangement. Porsche was to manufacture its own version of the car. At one point, Volkswagen head Rudolf Leidig declared the EX-425 was going to be a Volkswagen exclusively, thus denying Porsche's version of the 914's replacement. Although testing had begun in the spring of 1974, Volkswagen cancelled the EX-425 program, the reason being significant financial losses due to declining sales and rising development costs for new vehicles as well as the departure of Leidig. The recently introduced Volkswagen Scirocco was expected to fill the sports coupé market segment and the unfinished project was handed over to Audi to serve as the replacement for the Audi 100.

The cancellation of the EX-425 program led Porsche to market an entry-level car to replace the 912E, which was a US-only stop-gap model for 1976, and their version of the 914, which was discontinued in 1975. Porsche purchased the design and the finished development mule with a Bosch K-Jetronic mechanical fuel injection system from Volkswagen. The vehicle, dubbed the 924, received positive reviews, but was criticised by Porsche enthusiasts for its Audi-sourced 2.0 L engine. In 1979, Porsche introduced a Turbocharged version of the 924 to increase performance, but this model carried a high price. Rather than scrapping the model from its line-up, Porsche decided to develop the 944, as they had done with generations of the 911; although model numbers would change, the 924 would provide the basis for this new mid level model.

The prototype of this mid level model debuted at LeMans in 1981, an unusual strategy implemented by Porsche at the time. Called the 924 GTP LeMans, the car was based on the 924 Carrera GT LeMans that competed in the event prior to the GTP's introduction. The most noticeable change in the new race car was the departure from the Audi sourced 2.0 L inline-4 engine in favour of the 2.5 L engine developed by Porsche. The new engine was mounted at an angle of 45 degree to the right and utilised a dual overhead camshaft along with counter rotating balance shafts, an unusual feature for its time that provided better weight distribution and ensured smooth power delivery by eliminating inherent vibrations resulting in the engine lasting longer. A single KKK turbocharger producing 15.5 psi (1.1 bar) enabled the engine to generate a maximum power output of 420 PS (309 kW; 414 hp) at 6,800 rpm. The engine also utilised Bosch's prototype Motronic engine management system to control ignition timing, fuel injection and boost pressure. The new race car proved to be much more fuel efficient than its predecessor, stopping only 21 times in 24 hours for fuel. The 924 GTP managed seventh position overall behind the race winning 936 and a class win at the GTP+ 3.0 category in 1981 before being retired and stored in the Porsche museum. In 1982, Porsche debuted the production road legal version of the race car, called the 944. The car utilised many technologies its race bred sibling had used, including the balance shafts and the engine management system, but power was toned down for safety purposes.

The new all-alloy 2,479 cc (2.5 L; 151.3 cu in) inline-four engine, with a bore of 100 mm (3.94 in) and stroke of 78.9 mm (3.11 in), was in essence, half of the later 928's 5.0 L V8 engine, although very few parts were actually interchangeable. Not typical in luxury sports cars, the four-cylinder engine was chosen for fuel efficiency and size, because it had to be fitted from below on the Neckarsulm production line. To overcome roughness caused by the unbalanced secondary forces that are typical of inline four-cylinder engines, Porsche included two counter-rotating balance shafts running at twice the engine speed. Invented in 1904 by British engineer Frederick Lanchester, and further developed and patented in 1975 by Mitsubishi Motors, balance shafts carry eccentric weights which produce inertial forces that balance out the unbalanced secondary forces, making a four-cylinder engine feel as smooth as a six-cylinder engine. Porsche spent some time trying to develop their own system, but when they realised that they could not improve on the system developed by Mitsubishi, they chose to pay the licensing fees rather than come up with a variation just different enough to circumvent the patent. The licensing fees were about US$7–8 per car, which translated to about US$100 (equivalent to $334 in 2025) for the consumer to pay. The engine was factory-rated at 150 hp (112 kW; 152 PS) in its U.S. configuration. Revised bodywork with wider wheel arches, similar to that of the 924 Carrera GT, a fresh interior and upgrades to the braking and suspension systems rounded out the major changes.

== Models ==
Year	Model	Power	Engine
1982–1987	944	163 PS (120 kW; 161 hp); US 1982–1985: 143 hp (107 kW); US 1985–1987: 147 hp (110 kW)	2.5 L M44/40 I4
1988	944	160 PS (118 kW; 158 hp)	2.5 L M44/40 I4
1987–1989	944 S	190 PS (140 kW; 187 hp)	2.5 L M44/40 I4
1989	944	165 PS (121 kW; 163 hp)	2.7 L M44/12 I4
1989–1991	944 S2	211 PS (155 kW; 208 hp)	3.0 L M44/41 I4
1985–1988	944 Turbo (951)	220 PS (162 kW; 217 hp)	2.5 L M44/51 turbocharged I4
1988	944 Turbo S (951)	250 PS (184 kW; 247 hp)	2.5 L M44/52 turbocharged I4
1989–1991	944 Turbo (951)	250 PS (184 kW; 247 hp)	2.5 L M44/52 turbocharged I4

=== 944 ===

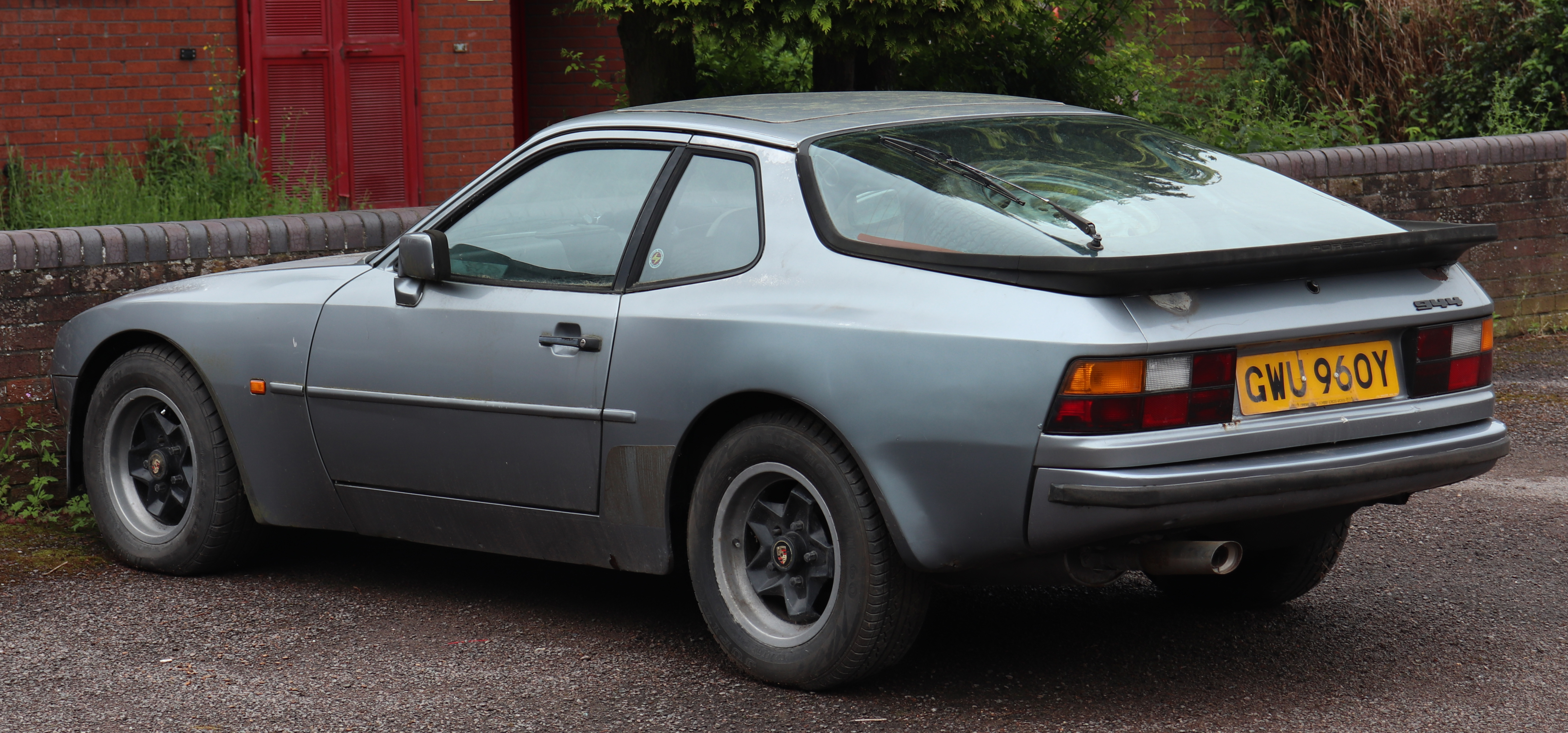
Porsche 944

Porsche introduced the 944 for the 1982 model year. It was slightly faster (despite having a poorer drag coefficient), was better equipped and more refined than the 924; it had better handling and stopping power, and was more comfortable to drive. The factory claimed a 0–97 km/h (60 mph) acceleration time of less than 9 seconds (8.3 seconds according to "Porsche the Ultimate Guide" By Scott Faragher). The car had a nearly even front to rear weight distribution (50.7% front/49.3% rear) courtesy of the rear transaxle balancing out the engine in the front. North American-market cars had bigger bumpers and the front bumper had a larger rubber portion, replacing the auxiliary lights as required by the North American laws.

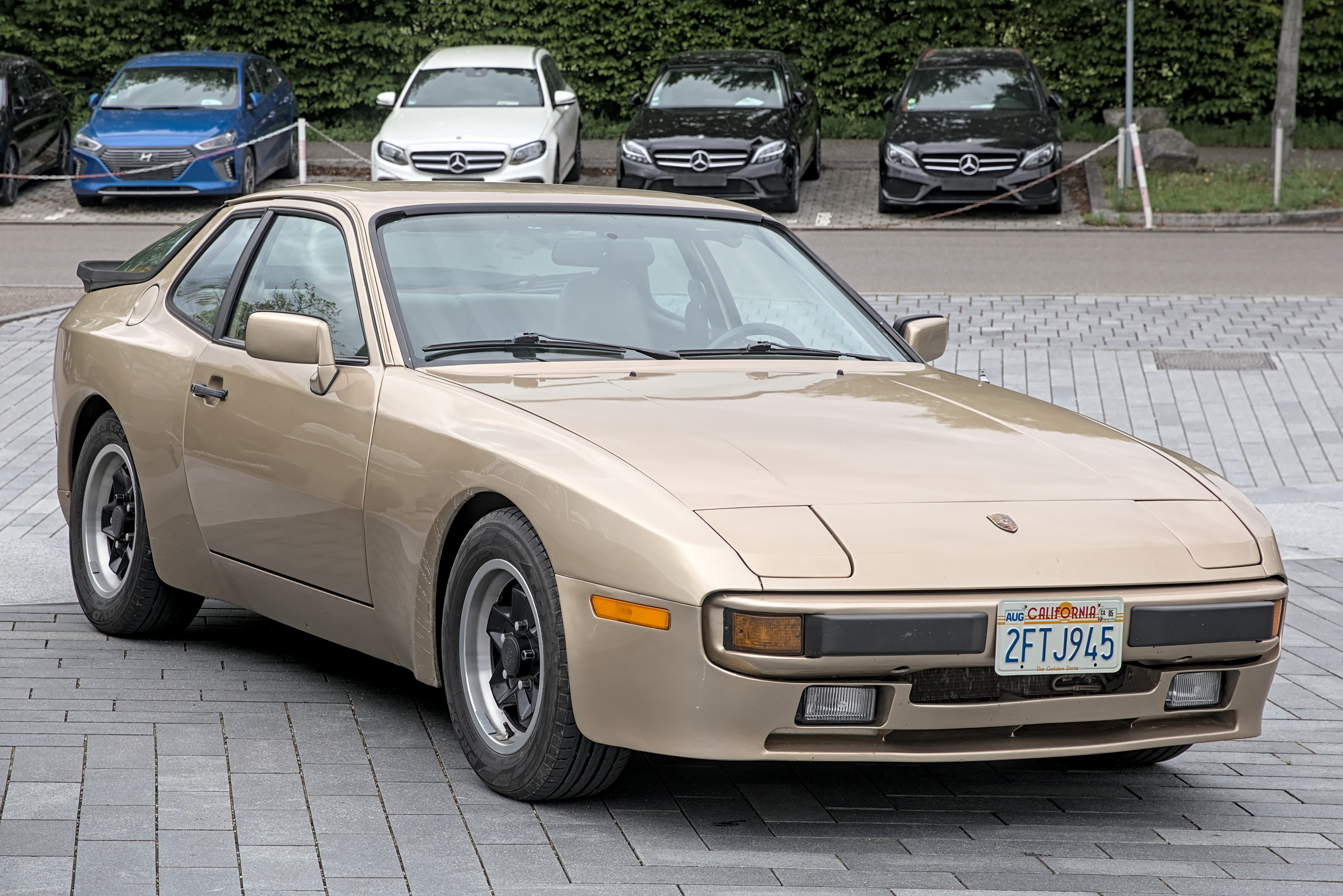
Porsche 944 (USA), showing the different front bumper

In mid-1985, the 944 underwent its first significant changes, these included: new dashboard and door panels, embedded radio antenna, upgraded alternator (from 90 amp to 115 amp), increased oil sump capacity, new front and rear cast alloy control arms and semi-trailing arms, larger fuel tank, optional heated and powered seats, Porsche HiFi sound system, and revisions in the mounting of the transaxle to reduce noise and vibration. The front windshield was now a flush-mounted unit. The "cookie cutter" style wheels used in the early 944s were upgraded to new "phone dial" style wheels (Fuchs wheels remained an option).

For the 1987 model year, the 944 Motronic DME was updated, and an anti-lock braking system (ABS) and driver and front passenger airbags were introduced. The 944 Turbo was the first car to offer airbags as standard equipment; they were optional on other 944 models. Because of the ABS, the wheel offset was changed to 52 mm (2.05 in), and Fuchs wheels were no longer available as an option.

1989 Porsche 944 (USA)

In early 1989, before the release of the 944S2, Porsche upgraded the 944's engine from the 2.5-liter four cylinder engine to a 2.7-liter engine having a bore of 104 mm (4.1 in) and stroke of 78.9 mm (3.1 in), with a rated power output of 165 PS (121 kW) (versus 160 PS [118 kW] for the 1988 2.5-liter version) and a significant increase in torque. In addition to the increase in displacement, the new engine featured a siamesed-cylinder block design and a different cylinder head which incorporated larger valves.

=== Callaway 944 ===
In 1983, American tuning company Callaway Cars began offering a turbocharged package for the US-Spec 944 in collaboration with Porsche. The standard 2.5 L straight-four engine was not suitable for forced induction because of the higher compression ratio of 9.5:1 which made the engine prone to failure when subject to forced induction along with the complex Bosch Motronic engine management system. Callaway engineers overcame this problem by increasing the volume of the engine's combustion chambers by milling away metal from both piston heads and chamber walls and by tweaking the Motronic system so it would ensure optimum fuel injection to the turbocharged engine along with installing their own Microfueler unit. This step was highly effective, but required disassembly of the entire engine, leading to the high cost of the package. The resulting engine's compression ratio was of 8.0:1 which was less than the standard engine but ensured linear power delivery. In order to ensure that there were no serious engine breakdowns, Callaway installed an ubiquitous internal waste gate recommending the use of 91-octane fuel in order for increased engine reliability. In addition to that, an IHI RHB6 turbocharger was installed on the right hand side of the engine along with a new free flow exhaust system incorporating a larger exhaust pipe for optimum performance. The small turbocharger eliminated turbo-lag thus ensuring linear levels of boost. The turbocharger produced 10 psi of boost, however a boost adjuster knob located on the dashboard was optional. With these modifications, the engine generated a power output of 284 hp (212 kW) at 6,000 rpm and 312 N⋅m (230 lb⋅ft) at 4,000 rpm as opposed of the standard car's 143 hp (107 kW) at 5,500 rpm. Performance increased over the standard car as well, with a 0–60 mph (0–97 km/h) acceleration time of 5.9 seconds and a top speed of 165 mph (266 km/h). Callaway quoted that the acceleration times would even be lower if the rev limiter was removed. Only 20 cars were produced making it one of the rarest Porsche 944s produced.

=== 944 Turbo (951 LHD/952 RHD) ===
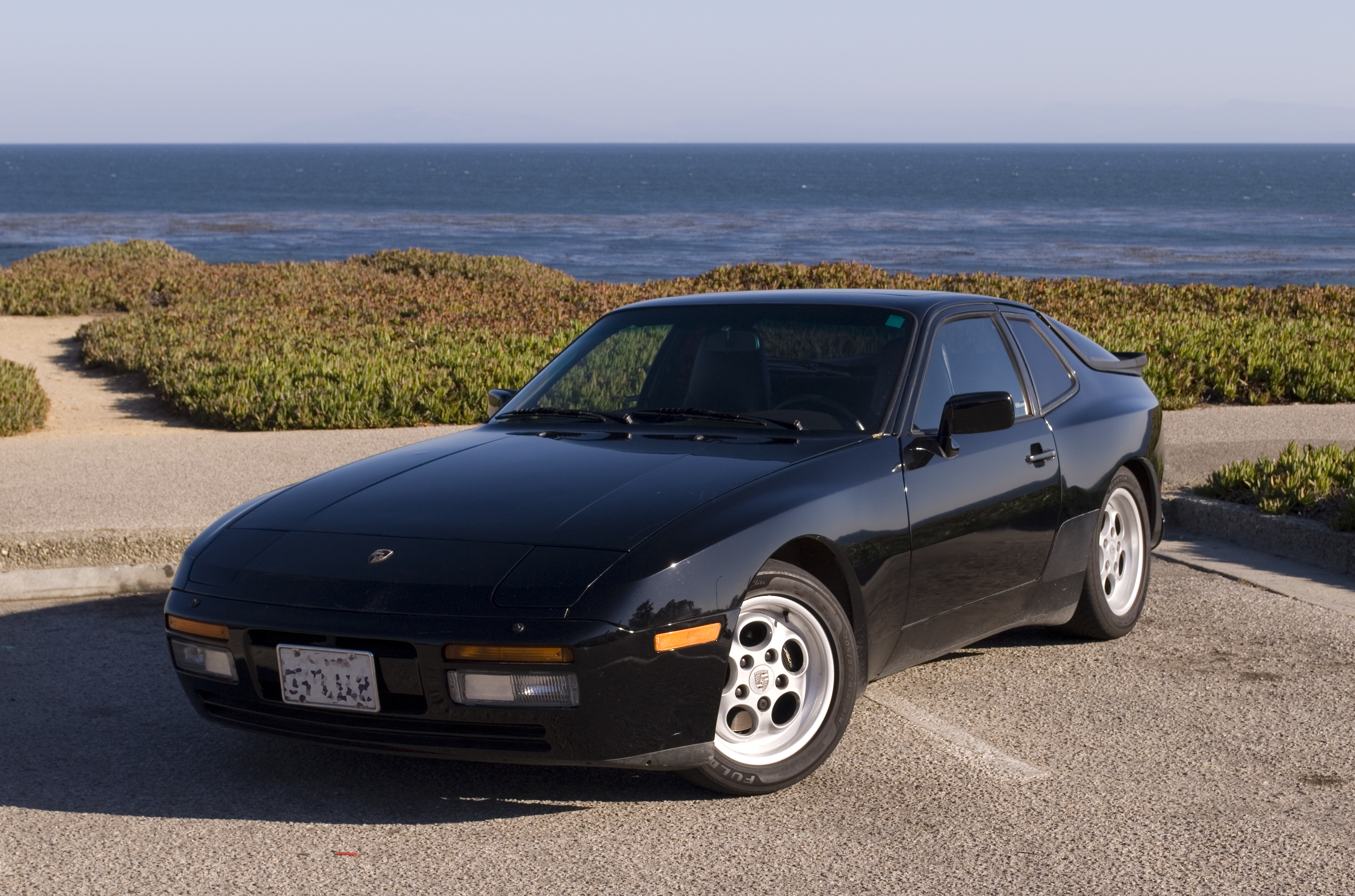
Porsche 944 Turbo

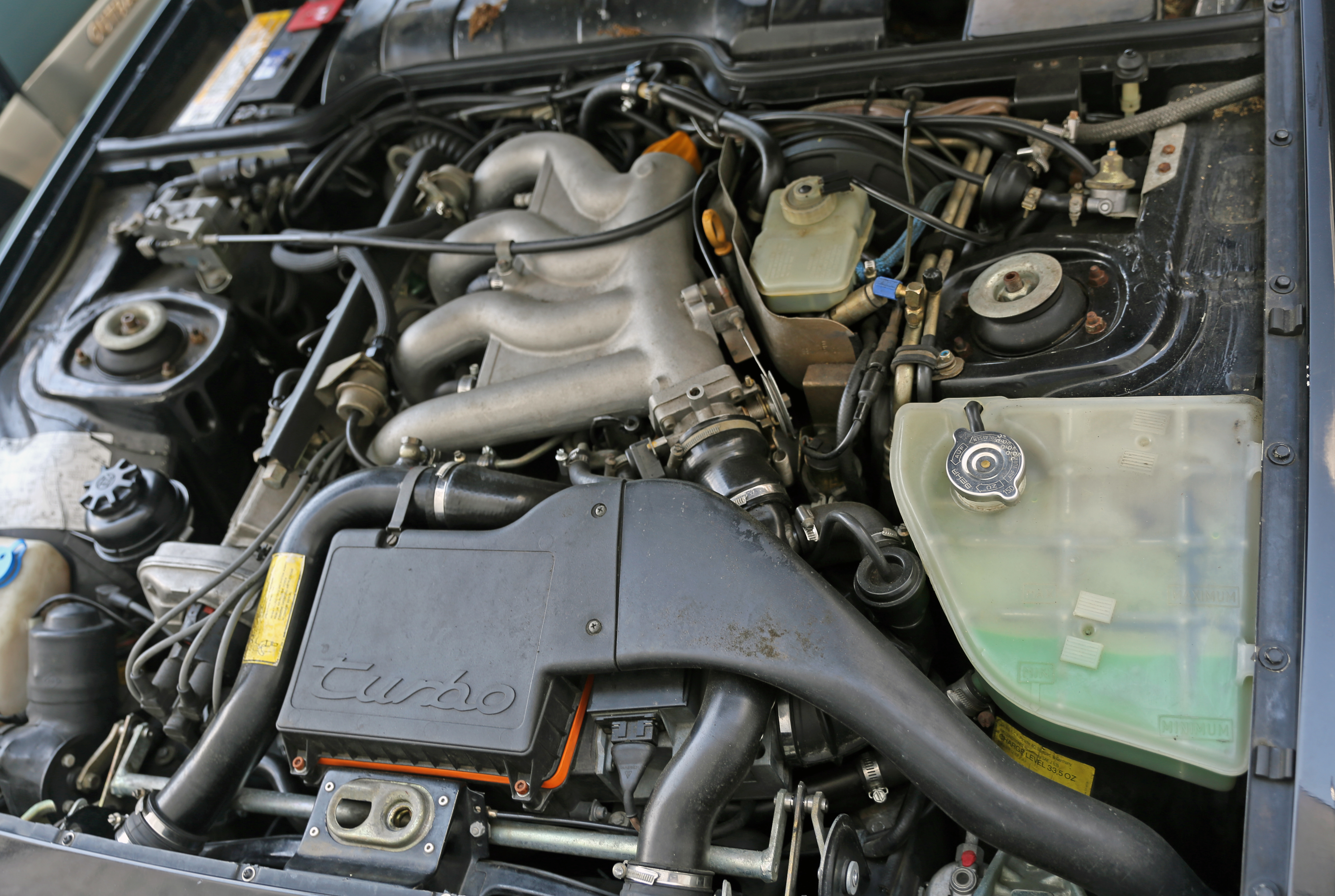
The M44/51 turbocharged Inline-4 engine

For the 1986 model year, Porsche introduced the 944 Turbo, known internally as the 951. The Turbo had a turbocharged and intercooled version of the standard 944's engine that generated 220 PS (162 kW) (217 hp (162 kW) in the US) at 6,000 rpm. In 1987, Car and Driver tested the 944 Turbo and achieved a 0–97 km/h (0–60 mph) time of 5.9 seconds. The Turbo was the first Porsche production car utilising a ceramic port liner to retain exhaust gas temperature along with new forged pistons and was also the first vehicle to produce an identical power output with or without a catalytic converter. The Turbo also featured several other changes, such as improved aerodynamics, notably an integrated front bumper. This featured the widest turn signals (indicators) fitted to any production car, a strengthened gearbox with a different final drive ratio, standard external oil coolers for both the engine and transmission, standard 16 inch wheels (optional forged Fuchs wheels), and a slightly stiffer suspension (progressive springs) to handle the extra weight. The Turbo also had headers, a crossover pipe and a downpipe made of Inconel. The Turbo's front and rear brakes were borrowed from the 911, with Brembo 4-piston fixed calipers and 12-inch discs. Engine component revisions, more than thirty in all, were made to the 951 to compensate for increased internal loads and heat.

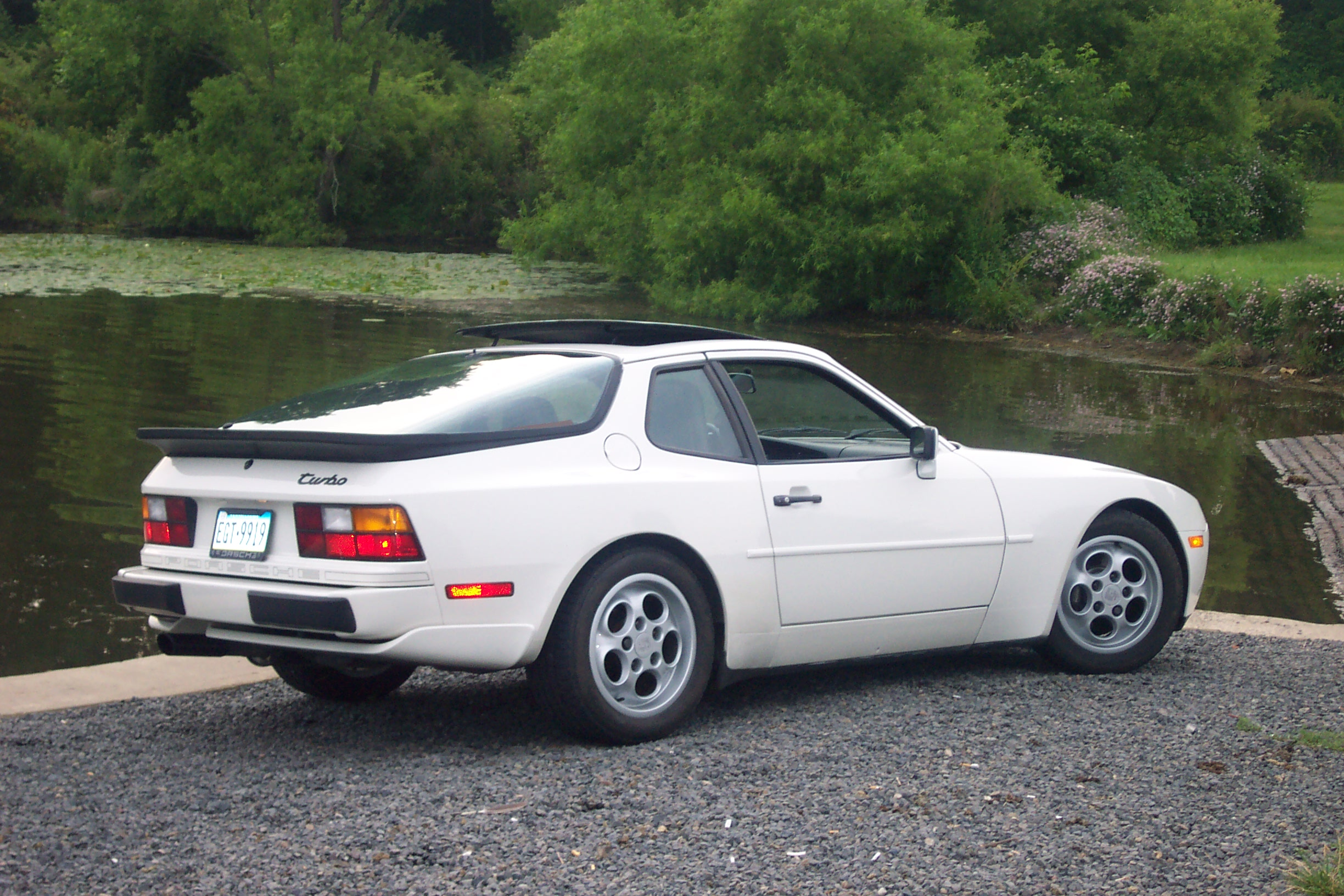
1987 Porsche 944 Turbo (US model)

Changes occurred for the 1987 model year. The North American variant of the 1987 944 Turbo became the first production car in the world to be equipped with driver and passenger side air bags as standard equipment. A low oil level light was added to the dash as well as a 180 mph (290 km/h) speedometer as opposed to the 170 mph (270 km/h) speedometer on the 1986 model year cars. Also included was the deletion of the transmission oil cooler, and a change in suspension control arms to reduce the car's scrub radius. The engine remained the same M44/51 inline-4 as in the 1986 model. ABS became fitted as standard on the Turbo, an option on the regular 944.

In 1988, Porsche introduced the 944 Turbo S with a more powerful engine (designation number M44/52) rated at a maximum power output of 250 PS (184 kW) at 6,000 rpm and 350 N⋅m (258 lb⋅ft) of torque at 4,000 rpm (the engine in the standard 944 Turbo generated 223 PS (164 kW) and 243 lb⋅ft (329 N⋅m)). This higher output was achieved by using a larger KKK K26-8 turbocharger housing and revised engine mapping which allowed maintaining maximum boost until 5,800 rpm, compared to the standard 944 Turbo, the boost would decrease from 0.75 bar (10.9 psi) at 3,000 rpm to 0.52 bar (7.5 psi) at 5,800 rpm. In June 1988, Car and Driver tested the 944 Turbo S (with the advantage of shorter final drive gear) and achieved a 0–97 km/h (0–60 mph) acceleration time of 5.5 seconds and a quarter-mile time of 13.9 seconds at 163 km/h (101 mph). Top speed was factory rated at 261 km/h (162 mph).

The 944 Turbo S' suspension had the "M030" option consisting of Koni adjustable shocks at the front and rear, with ride height adjusting threaded collars on the front struts, progressive rate springs, larger hollow rear anti-roll/torsion bars, harder durometer suspension bushings, larger 26.8 mm (1.055 in) hollow anti-roll/torsion bars at the front, and chassis stiffening brackets in the front frame rails. The air conditioning dryer lines were routed so as to clear the front frame brace on the driver's side. The 944 Turbo S wheels, known as the Club Sport design, were 16-inch Fuchs forged and flat-dished, similar to the Design 90 wheel. Wheel widths were 7 inches (178 mm) at the front, and 9 inches (229 mm) at the rear with a 52 mm (2.047 in) offset; sizes of the Z-rated tyres were 225/50 in the front and 245/45 in the rear. The front and rear fender edges were rolled to accommodate the larger wheels. The manual transmission (case code designation: AOR) featured a higher friction clutch disc setup, an external cooler, and a limited-slip differential with a 40% lockup setting. The Turbo S' front brakes were borrowed from the 928 S4, with larger Brembo GT 4-piston fixed calipers and 12-inch discs; rear Brembo brakes remained the same as a standard Turbo.

The 944 Turbo S interior featured power seats for both driver and passenger, where the majority of the factory-built Turbo S models sported a "Burgundy plaid" (Silver Rose edition) interior colour but other interior/exterior colours were available. A 10-speaker sound system and equalizer + amp was a common option with the Turbo S and S/SE prototypes. Only the earlier 1986, 253 PS (186 kW) prototypes featured a "special wishes custom interior" options package.

In 1989 and later production years, the 'S' designation was dropped from the 944 Turbo S, and all of the turbocharged iterations of the 944 featured the Turbo S enhancements as standard, however the "M030" suspension and the Club Sport wheels were not part of that standard. The 944 Turbo S was the fastest production four cylinder car of its time.

=== 944 S ===
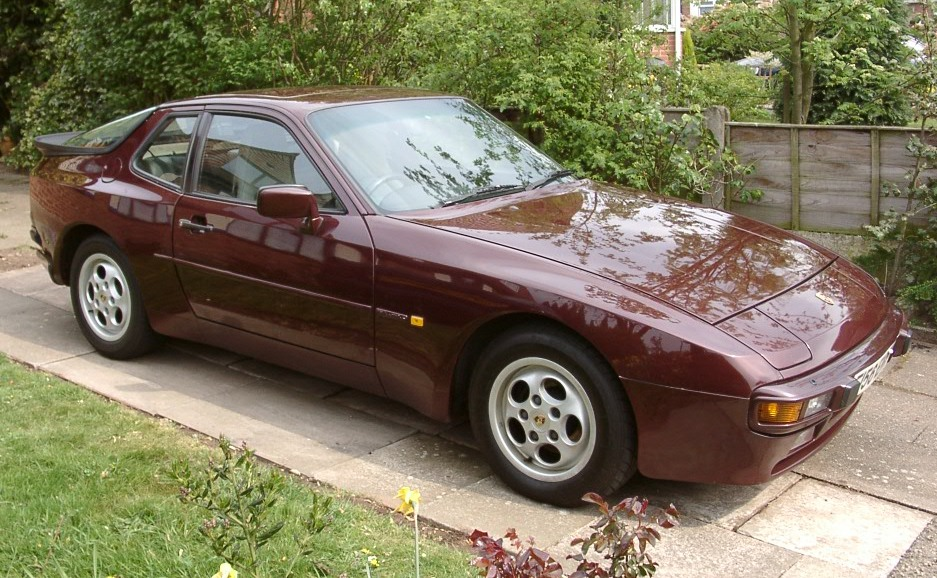
1987–1988 Porsche 944S, with the 16-valve DOHC engine

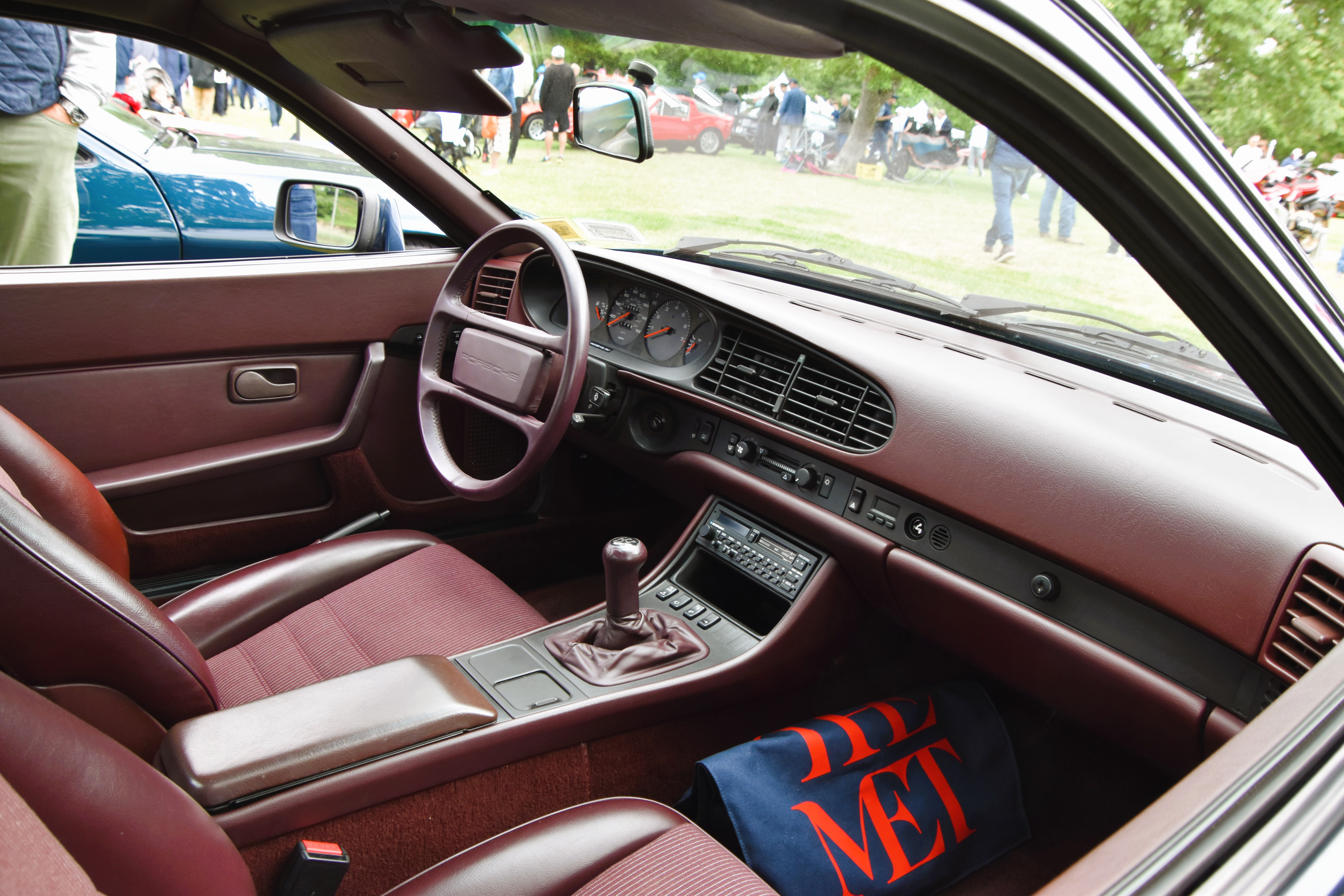
Porsche 944S interior

For the 1987 model year, the 944 S (the S being the abbreviation of Super) was introduced. The 944 S featured a high performance naturally aspirated, dual-overhead-cam 16-valve 190 PS (140 kW; 187 hp) version of the 2.5 L engine (M44/40) featuring a self-adjusting timing belt tensioner. This marked the first use of four-valves-per-cylinder heads and DOHC in the 944, derived from the 928 S4 featuring a redesigned camshaft drive, a magnesium intake tract/passages, magnesium valve cover, larger capacity oil sump, and revised exhaust system. The alternator capacity was 115 amps. The wheel bearings were also strengthened and the brake servo action was made more powerful. Floating 944 calipers were standard, but the rear wheel brake circuit pressure regulator from the 944 turbo was used. Small '16 Ventiler' script badges were added on the sides in front of the body protection mouldings. Performance figures included 0-100 km/h (62 mph) being achieved in 6.5 seconds (best), due to a 1,296 kg (2,857 lb) curb weight, and a 232 km/h (144 mph) top speed. It also featured an improved programmed Bosch Digital Motronic 2.1 Computer/DME with dual knock sensors for improved fuel performance for the higher 10.9:1 compression ratio cylinder head. Like the 944 Turbo, the 944 S received progressive springs for improved handling, larger front and rear anti-roll bars, revised transmission and gearing to better suit the 2.5 L DOHC engine's higher 6,800 rpm rev limit. Dual air bags, limited-slip differential, and an anti-lock braking system were optional on the 944 S.

A Club Sport touring package (M637) was available as was the lightweight 16-inch CS/Sport Fuchs 16x7 and 16x9 forged alloy wheels. This version was raced in Canada, Europe and in the IMSA Firehawk Cup Series held in the U.S. Production was only during 1987 and 1988. It was superseded in 1989 by the 'S2' version. The 1987 944 S' power-to-weight ratio was such that it was able to accelerate from 0 to 100 km/h in 6.5 seconds thus matching the acceleration of its newer larger displacement 3.0 L 944 S2 sibling.

=== 944 S2 ===
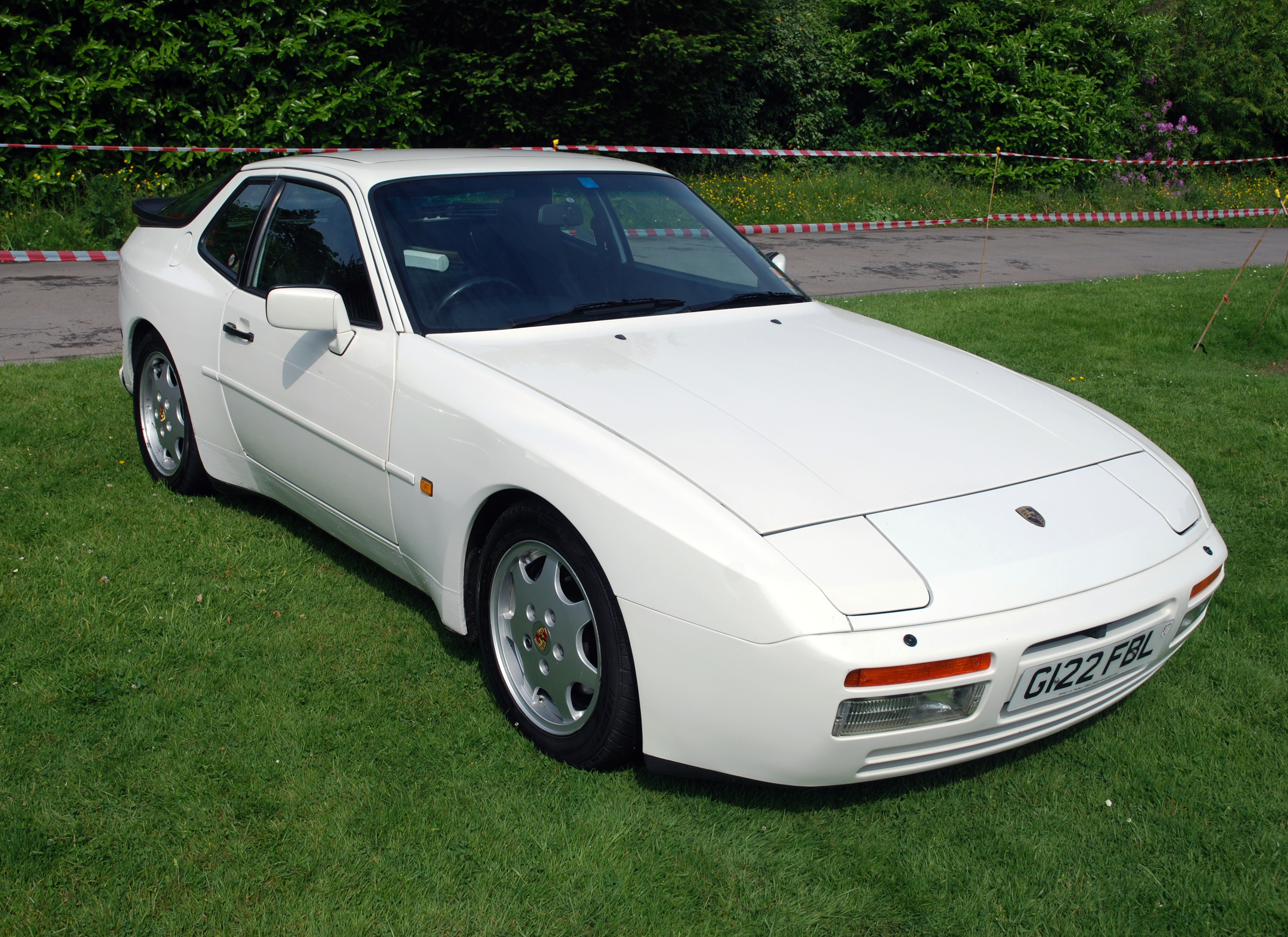
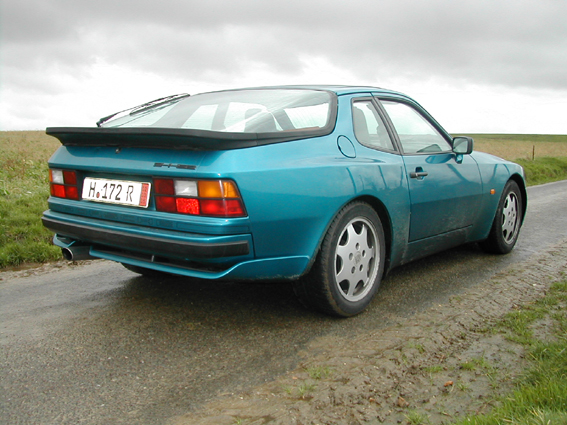
1989–1991 944 S2 coupé

In 1989 the 944 S2 was introduced, powered by a 211 PS (155 kW; 208 hp) naturally aspirated, dual-overhead-cam 16-valve 3.0 L version of the 944 S' engine. With a bore of 104 mm (4.1 in) and a stroke of 88 mm (3.5 in), it was the largest production four-cylinder engine of its time. The 944 S2 also received a revised transmission and gearing to better suit the 3.0 L M44/41 powerplant. The 944 S2 had the same rounded nose and rear valance as found on the Turbo model. Quoted performance figures included a 0–97 km/h acceleration time of 6.0 seconds (0–100 km/h being achieved in 6.8 seconds) and a top speed of 240 km/h (149 mph) for the cars with a manual transmission. A Club Sport touring package (M637) was also available. Dual air bags (left hand drive models), limited-slip differential and ABS were optional. Design 90 16-inch cast alloy wheels were standard equipment.

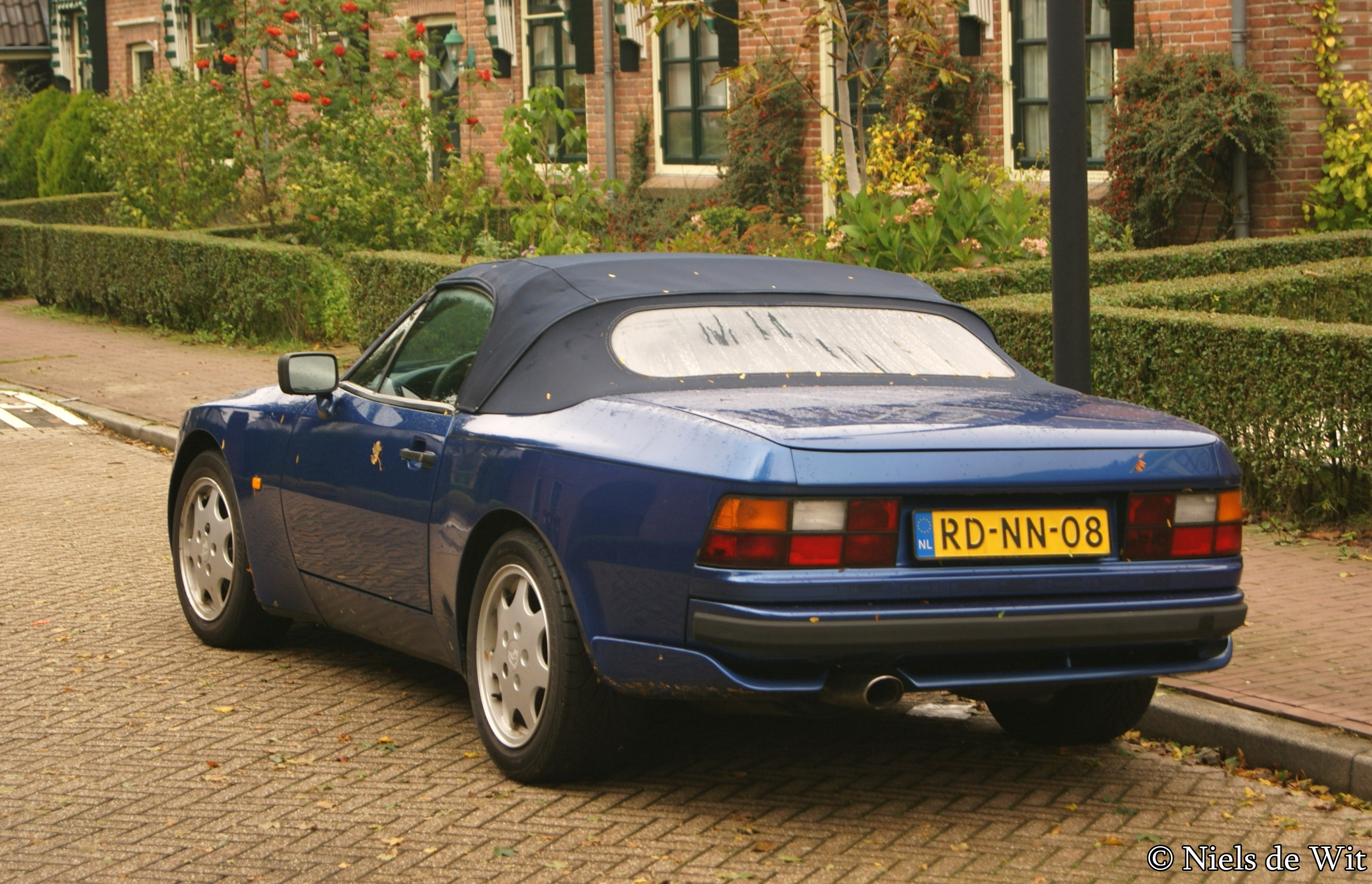
Porsche 944 S2 Cabriolet

=== 944 S2 Cabriolet ===
The first Porsche 944 Cabriolet prototype was introduced at the Frankfurt Auto show in 1985. This first prototype was styled by Anotele Lapine and built by Bauer. This new Porsche 944 Cabriolet was very well received, but it wasn't until 1987 that the American Sunroof Corporation (ASC) won the contract to build the new model. It took another two years for ASC to complete their new Weinsberg plant in Heilbronn, Germany before they could begin production. It was January 1989, before the new Porsche 944 S2 Cabriolet would begin to roll off ASC's assembly line.

The S2 Cabriolet was a very complicated build, where 944 coupe bodies were taken off the assembly line at Neckarsulm, West Germany and then delivered to ASC in Heilbronn, West Germany. At ASC, structural steel reinforcement plates are welded in the front end of the car and floor pan area, to give the body the amount of torsional strength and crash safety required for a Cabriolet. After welding in these reinforcement plates, cuts are made in the body at the windshield frame, B pillars, rear side panels and tail panel, in preparation for coupe top removal. New parts to support the convertible top and the new rear deck lid are also welded in place. After the top is removed, the new Cabriolet body was sent back to Neckarsulm, where it is run through the standard production paint shop and assembly line for drive train install. Consequently, the structure of the paint finish and other corrosion inhibiting measures conform with the quality standards for Porsche and its new Cabriolet. The assembled Cabriolet was then sent back to ASC in Heilbronn for convertible top and trim installation.

Production for the North American market would not start until May 1989, with only 16 of the 944 S2 Cabriolets being produced for the US market. The VIN codes of these 16 cars for 1989 is unique, with two incorrect characters in the VIN starting with WP0BA. The first character "W" represents West Germany, the second character "P" signifies Porsche, the third character "0" signifies sports car, which are all correct. However, the 4th character "B" signifies the body type for a Targa, and the fifth character "A" signifies an incorrect engine type for the 944 S2 Cabriolet. Porsche would correct this discrepancy and change the VIN codes for the 1990 model to WP0CB, with the 4th character "C" signifying a Cabriolet and the 5th character "B" signifying the correct engine for the 944 S2 Cabriolet. The limited number of Cabriolets for 1989 went to only a handful of dealers and some were initially not for sale. Many of these first year Cabriolets were provided to various auto magazine staff for road test and performance articles. Others were used as advertising for reserving a 1990 model, with production growing to 1,824 Cabriolets for the US market. US production would fall to 562 Cabriolets for 1991, which would be its final year. Only 2402 Porsche 944 S2 Cabriolets were imported into the US between 1989 and when the model was discontinued in 1991. It would be replaced by the Porsche 968 Cabriolet for 1992.

=== 944 Turbo Cabriolet ===
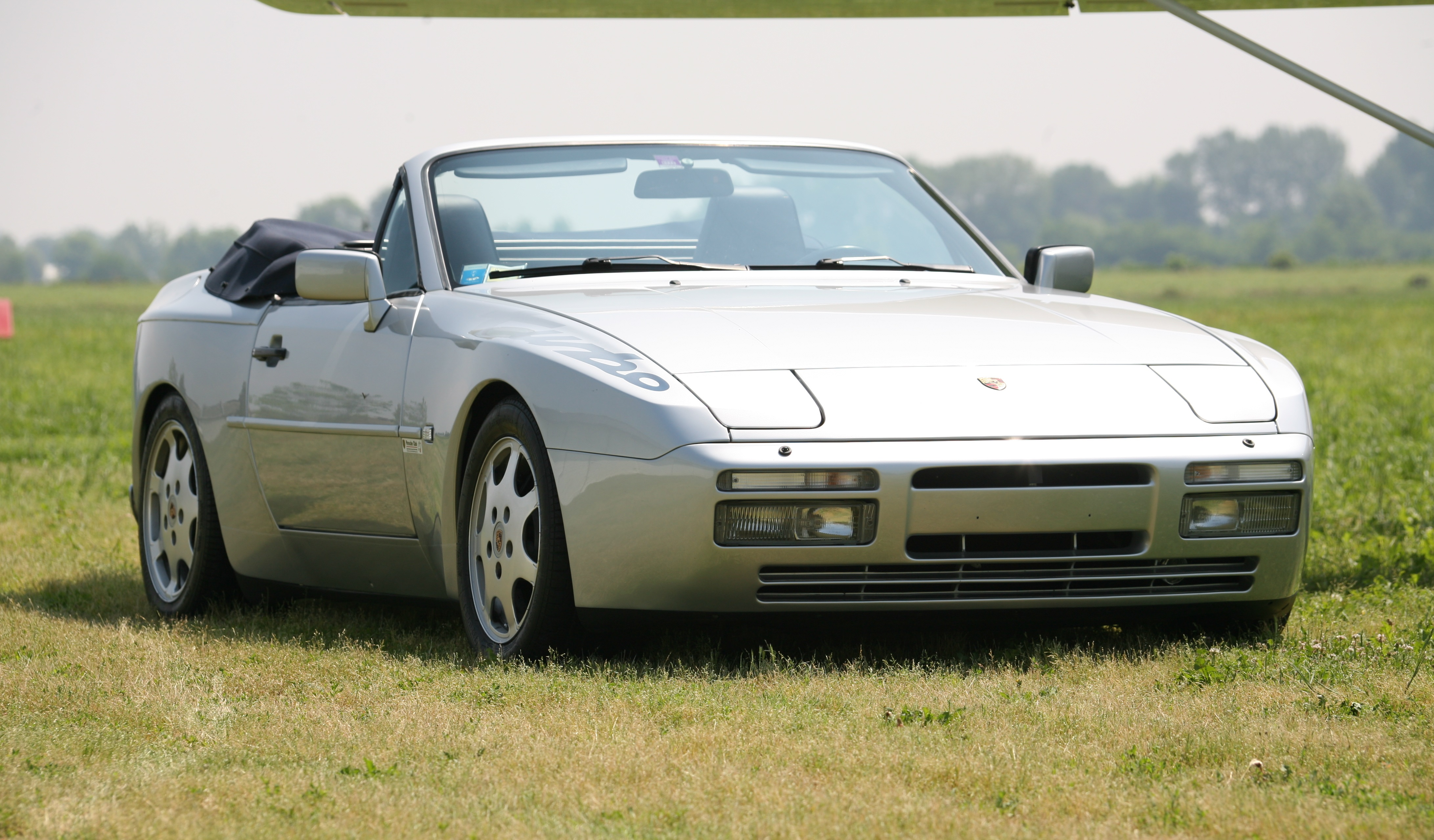
Porsche 944 Turbo Cabriolet

In February 1991, Porsche unveiled the 944 Turbo Cabriolet, which combined the Turbo S' 250 PS (184 kW) engine with the cabriolet body style also built by ASC. Porsche initially announced that 600 cars would be made; ultimately 625 were built, 100 of which were right-hand drive for the United Kingdom, Japanese, Australian, and South African markets. None were imported to the U.S. and The Americas.

=== End of production ===
In early 1990, Porsche engineers began working on what they had intended to be the third evolution of the 944, the S3. As they progressed with the development process, they realised that so many parts were being changed that they had produced an almost entirely new vehicle. Porsche consequently shifted development from the 944 S/S2 to the car that would replace the 944 entirely, the 968. The 944's final year of production was 1991 with over 4,000 cars built and sold. In 1992, the 968 debuted and was sold alongside the 928 until 1995, when both water-cooled front engine models were discontinued without a direct successor.

In February 1992, a verbal agreement was given to Porsche UK from Stuttgart for the production of a prototype “Sports Equipment” 944 S2 Model with following approval to construct 15 vehicles for the UK market from the last 944 S2 coupés produced. A unique 30mm lower fully adjustable Koni Suspension with springs from the Turbo was used in combination with upgraded 31mm front stabiliser bar & adjustable rear bar. Engine output was increased to 225 PS (165 kW) with re-map to improve torque above 4,250rpm, as well as a sports exhaust system. Cosmetically the “SE” was fitted with Porsche colour matched “Porsche Sport” steering wheel, Bi-plane rear spoiler, SE side decals and rear badging. The modifications resulted in improved acceleration in higher rev range, flatter cornering, more precise steering, improved responsiveness, confidence inspiring handling leading to an overall sharper response. The 944 S2 SE prototypes are regarded as the inspiration and in part development for the later 968 Club Sport.

== Production ==
A grand total 163,192 cars in the 944 family were produced between 1982 and 1991. This made it the most successful sports car in Porsche's history until the introduction of the Boxster/Cayman and 997 Carrera.

The successor to the 944 was the 968, which was introduced in the 1992 model year and was based on an evolution of the same front-engine, transaxle platform of the 944.

=== 944 ===
A total of 113,070 944s were made between 1982 and 1989, with 56,921 being exported to the United States. A project joint venture with Porsche and Callaway resulted in 20 specially built turbo 944's built for the US market in 1983.

Model Year	Production	World Markets	US	Notes
1982	3,921	3,921		
1983	14,633*	9,127	5,490	20 Callaway 944 Turbo cars
1984	26,539	9,921	16,618	
1985	23,720	17,553	6,167	
1986	17,010	6,109	10,901	
1987	10,689	2,343	8,346	
1988	5,965	2,226	3,731	8 exported to Australia
1989	10,593	4,941	5,652	2.7 L Engine
Grand Total	113,070	56,141	56,921	

=== 944 Turbo (951/952) ===
A total of 25,245 944 Turbos were made, with 13,982 being exported to the United States.

Model Year	Production	World Markets	US	Notes
1985	178	178		
1986	10,937*	3,424	7,513	12 S/SE Prototypes, 8 LHD (951), 4 RHD (952)
1987	4,955	1,546 + 88 Turbo CUP cars	3,210 + 11 Turbo CUP cars	
1988	4,097 **	1,875 + 94 CUP	1,874 + 99 CUP	in addition, 126 SP Canadian market cars, 30 Australian Turbo CUP cars
1989	4,103	1,333	1,385	1,385 Canadian market cars
1990	1251	1107	144	44 Canadian market cars
1991	938 †	938		
Grand Total	25,245	9,331	13,982	30 Australian market cars 1,511 Canadian market cars

* - Includes 12 Turbo S (951) / SE in UK (952), factory built prototypes of which 10 were exported to markets outside Germany.
** - Includes 1635 Turbo S
† - Includes 251 Turbo Cabriolet. A different source, Jerry Sloniger's article in the October 1991 issue of Excellence, indicates that the factory built 525, of which 255 were exported to markets outside Germany.

< >"CUP" designates a cup car which is a special edition race car.

=== 944 S ===
A total of 12,936 944 S models were produced from 1987 to 1988, with 8,815 being exported to the United States. In 1985 a Prototype 944 S Cabriolet 'Studie' built by Braun was powered by the 2.5 L 16 valve which developed 185 hp, forerunner of the later production 944 S and S2 Cabriolet models.

Model Year	Production	World Markets	US	Notes
1987	5,224*	1,912	3,312	75 CS/Club Sport & Cup Cars
1988	7,562*	2,321	5,391	75 CS/Club Sport & Cup Cars
Special Editions	151	38	112	1 1985 "Studie" Cabriolet Prototype (Braun)
Grand Total	12,936	4,271	8,815	

* - Includes CS - Club Sport's built for US, and ROW markets.

=== 944 S2 ===
A total of around 14,071 944 S2's were made between 1989 and 1991, with 3,650 being exported to the United States.

Model Year	Production	World Markets	US	Notes
1989	7,632	4,941	2,691	51 Australian market cars
1990	3,321	2,872	449	71 Australian market cars
1991	3,118	2,608	510	6 Australian market cars
Grand Total	14,071	10,421	3,650	

=== 944 S2 Cabriolet ===
Production of the 944 S2 Cabriolet began in May 1989, but official total production numbers for that first year and world market production are not well established. The only production number listed for 944 S2 Cabriolets in 1989, are the 16 produced for the US market. Although there are several 1989 944 S2 Cabriolets still registered in the US, there is speculation that the original 16 produced for the US market in 1989 were initially not intended to be sold to the public. There are more than a few 1989 built/manufactured 944 S2 Cabriolets registered in the UK and Germany, both left and right hand drive. It is presumed that much of the world production for 1989 stayed in Germany and the UK.

Total production for years 1990 and 1991 are well documented, as well as the 3 year total production for the US market of 2,402 units.

Model Year	Production	World Markets	US	Notes
1989	N/A	N/A	16	Vin numbers for 1989 US market begin WP0BA, 16 cars only.
1990	3,938	2,114	1,824	Vin numbers for 1990/1991 US market begin WP0CB.
1991	1,702	1,140	562	Last year of production.
Grand Total	5,656	3,254	2,402	

== Motorsport ==
=== SCCA Production Class and Trans Am ===
After numerous successes in Europe by both the Porsche factory team and privateers at Le Mans and various supporting races, the 924/944 platform was then introduced with relative success over in North America under the SCCA Production Class. In 1984 the Rick Hurst Racing 1983 944 #44 won all 4 inaugural endurance races of the scca endurance series in the ss/gt (the turbo ran in prototype) class. Rick Hurst Racing campaigned 944s into the late 1980s eventually running two escort turbo cars in "cup configuration" at the end. In 1986, the Carlsen Racing 944 won the SCCA Escort Endurance Series Championship (S/S GT). The 1988 and 1989 SCCA GT2 titles were claimed the 944S driven by David Finch for the years 1988 and 1989. Heavily modified versions of the 944, some with a tube framed chassis that were built by Klym Fabcar in North America were run in the SCCA Trans Am championship, Initially these cars were run with the Audi sourced 2.0 litre engine but were dropped in favour of the Porsche 2.5 litre which was then tuned and upgraded to have an output of up to 750bhp by a company called ANDIAL

=== 944 Turbo Cup ===
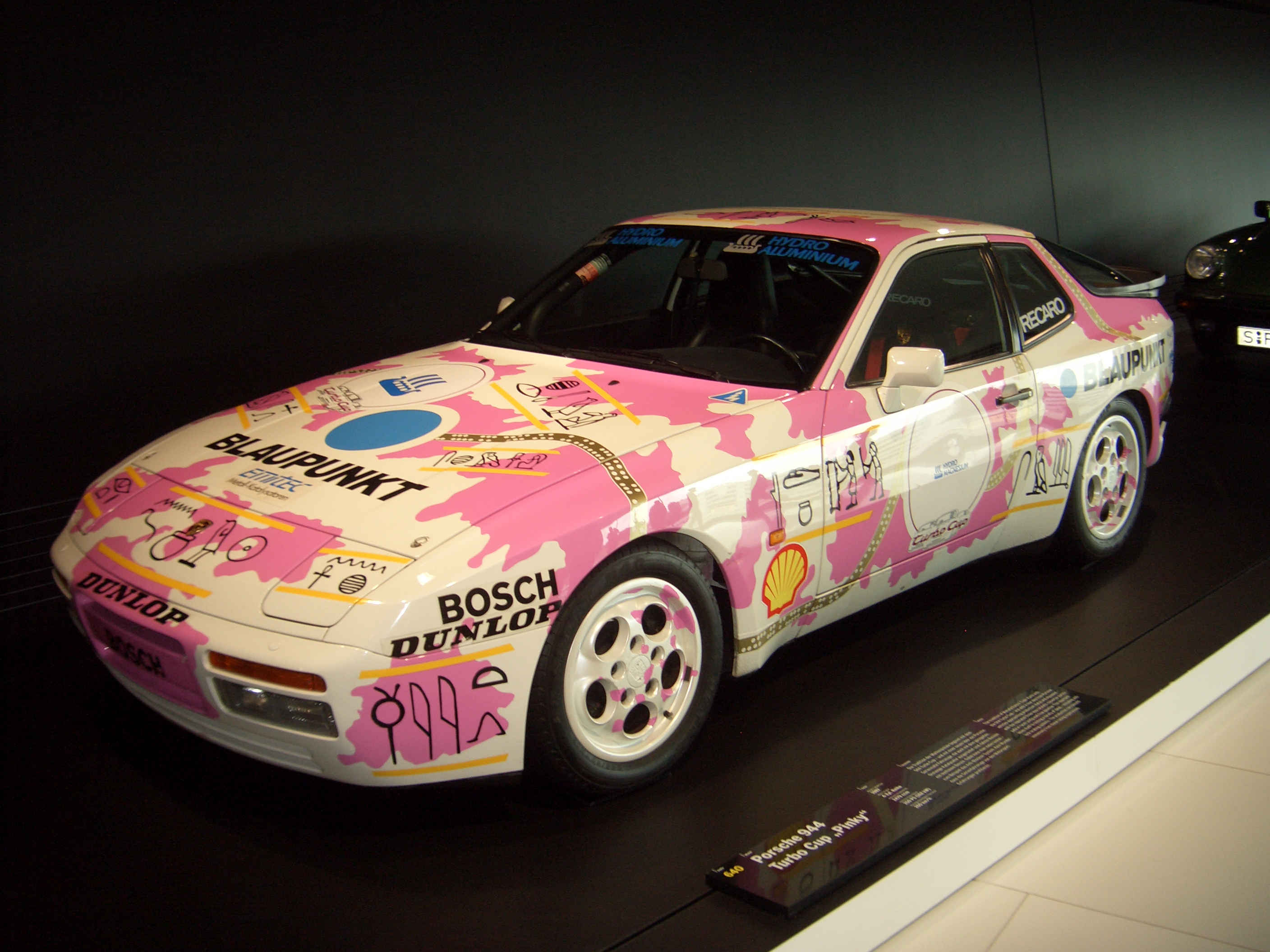
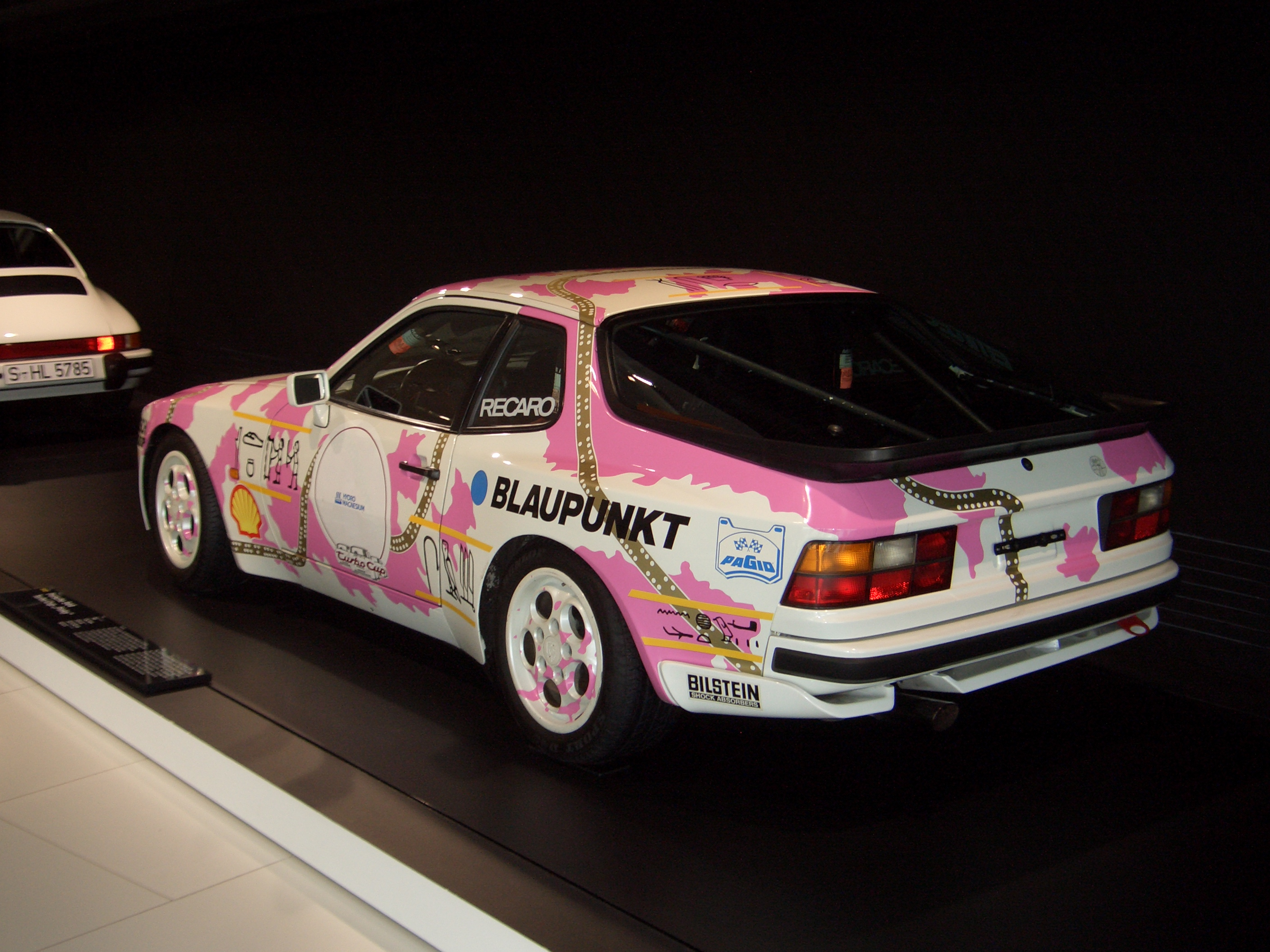
Porsche 944 Turbo Cup

Porsche began a race series for the top-of-the line 944 Turbo in the mid-1980s. There were five championship series: one in France, one in West Germany, one in South Africa, one in Canada, and one in the United States. Each had a different number of cars competing. The Turbo Cup cars developed for the series had substantial upgrades over their road going counterparts. These included a larger KKK K26-8 turbocharger, a magnesium intake manifold and oil pan, a reinforced transmission, clutch, differential and axles along with removal of A/C, power seats, leather upholstery, sun visors, power windows, power steering, rear wiper, headlight washers, fender liners, storage pockets, and rear trunk release, upgraded struts, shocks, springs, suspension mounts, as well as an adjustable ABS system, bigger brakes with racing pads, magnesium wheels, a transmission oil cooler, and a lightweight battery. This yielded weight savings of approximately 272 kg (600 lb) and improvements in performance of the car as the Turbo Cup cars had a 0–97 km/h (60 mph) acceleration time of 5.3 seconds and a top speed of nearly 274 km/h (170 mph). 192 Turbo Cup cars were made of which 99 cars for Canada, VIN start WP0AAO and 93 for the rest of the world, VIN start WP0ZZZ. Cup cars are identified having the last 4 VIN digits from 1501 to 1700. As far as known only one left the factory as a one mirror Cup car (VIN 1524) for a doctor in Germany with the specially ordered normal black leather interior, targa roof top and white body colour. Track of this car is lost since 2019 after the original wheels were stolen in Münster and the car was sold.

=== 944 one-make series ===
The 944 continues to be used for motorsport long after ceasing production.

In 1999, a grassroots-level one-make racing series for lightly modified Porsche 944s called the 944 Challenge was established in Victoria, Australia, and remains popular in its 25th season as of 2024. A similar category, 944 Spec, in run in the United States. By Porsche standards, 944s are abundant and not as highly sought after by collectors, keeping the costs of the racing series relatively affordable.

== Awards ==
The 944 was on Car and Driver's Ten Best list from 1983 through 1985, and the Turbo made the list for 1986.

In 1984, Car and Driver named the 944 the Best Handling Production Car in America.

== See also ==
- 944 Cup
