= Fuchs wheel =

Historical automotive component

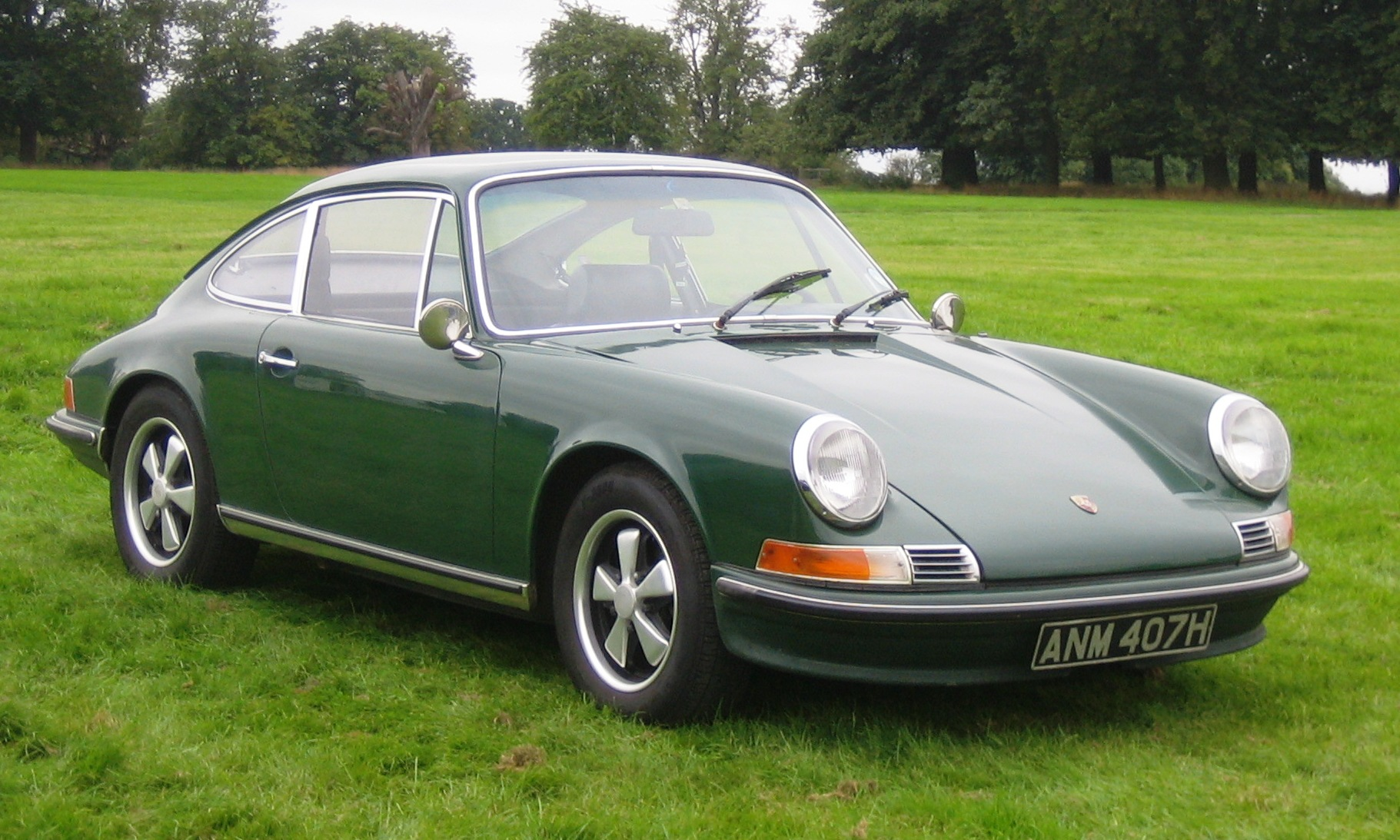
1969 Porsche 911E with Fuchs wheels

The Fuchs wheel or Fuchsfelge is a wheel made for the first Porsche 911 model in the early 1960s. Designed in conjunction with Otto Fuchs KG, Porsche modeler Heinrich Klie and Ferdinand Porsche Jr for the 1967 model year Porsche 911S, the Fuchs wheel was the first light-weight forged wheel to be fitted to a production automotive vehicle. They provided the rear-engined sports car with a reduction in unsprung mass, using an alloy wheel.

== History ==
Still in production, current interest in the Fuchs wheel derives from its vintage design and history in motor racing from the 1960s. The Porsche/Fuchs wheels were lightweight due to aluminium alloy construction. The 1967 Porsche 911S was the first vehicle to sport the Fuchs wheel and the first entry in the long and evolving line of 911 Porsche's. In the early 60's, several sports car manufacturers were still using steel or even wire wheels. Porsche engineers knew from racing experience that lighter wheels brought multiple benefits in speed and handling.

Prior to 1960, Porsche had already gained some experience making lightweight aluminium Tank components for the German Army. However; they had difficulty transferring this skill set to their Automotive business. Porsche searched for a technology partner and found Otto Fuchs AG whose experience was in casting lightweight materials in the aerospace sector. They were able to partner and apply their knowledge to the automotive sector.

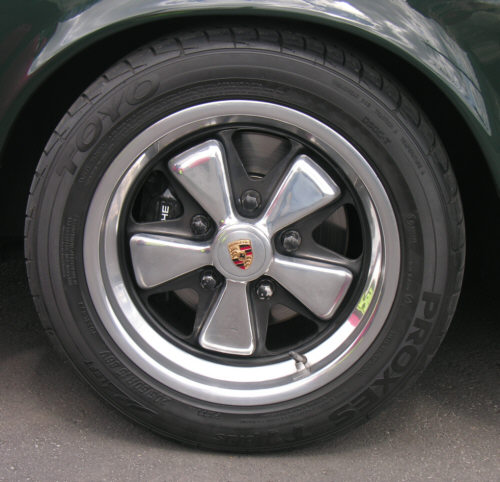
Silver 'Fuchs' design wheel from an early 1970's Porsche 911.

The Fuchs wheel design process began with an initial sketch on February 13, 1965. The design team added details to the sketch on May 4, 1965 with the final design being approved by Heinrich Klie and Ferdinand Porsche. The Fuchs wheel dimensions are 4.5 inches wide and 15 inches in diameter. The first Fuchs wheels were mounted on a 911 Targa, which was displayed at the 1965 IAA Auto Show to gauge interest in the new design. Due to positive reception, Porsche placed an order for 5,000 wheels for the upcoming model year 911S.

Similar to the Porsche design, Otto Fuchs created wheels for other German manufacturers such as Mercedes-Benz, Audi and BMW. The Mercedes 'baroque' style wheels were manufactured until the late 1980s and the multi-spoke design used on the first BMW M5 of that era. Otto Fuchs claims that their wheels were at one point, used on almost every Brand of premium automobiles including Lamborghini, Audi, Rolls-Royce, Porsche, BMW and Mercedes.

== Design ==
As planning initially begun in 1965, Porsche requested a mass-produced wheel that was at least three kilograms lighter than the widely used steel wheels of the period, for their first iteration of the 911S. The rationale behind this was due to the significant effect that unsprung mass has on the handling and chassis dynamics of a car. Many wheel manufacturers contacted Porsche with cast aluminium wheels that fit the weight specification; however, during testing, all wheels produced using this process were found to be fragile and unable to handle the required load.

Otto Fuchs solved this problem for Porsche by using a method that was revolutionary for the time and never before used in a road automotive application, a one-piece forged aluminium wheel. This process involves pressing solid aluminium blocks under extreme pressure to produce high-strength parts, and is still used for the manufacture of Fuchs wheels today. Shortly following the release of the first design sketches on 13 February 1965, Otto Fuchs' forging process resulted in wheels that were 5kg each, 3kg lighter than the standard steel 911 wheels of the time.

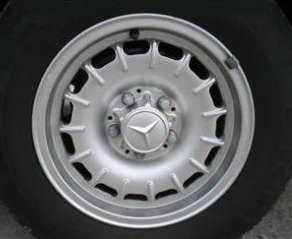
The 'Baroque' style Fuchs wheel designed for Mercedes-Benz

Presented to Porsche in May 1965, the original shape of the Fuchs wheel featured tapered spokes in the five connecting webs between hub and rim. The transition from this presented proposal to the flat spokes of the synonymous 'cloverleaf' design was the working of Ferdinand Porsche Jr, and is summarised by an extract from the minutes of the meeting between the Fuchsfelge company and Porsche, subsequently published by Porsche Newsroom, and states "In contrast to our proposal, Mr. Porsche Jr. changed the shape of the five connecting pieces between the hub and the rim for reasons of style and appearance. While our design was well-adapted to the shape of the series vehicles now being retired, the shape developed by Mr. Porsche Jr. appears more harmonious with the new vehicle". Ferdinand Porsche Jr based this design change on a 'kleeblatt', or four leaf clover.

== Engineering ==
Fuchsfelge AG was responsible for many technological advancements in the creation of automotive wheels around the late 1960s and early 1970s; notably the creation of the first forged wheel on behalf of Porsche, and the first series-production aluminium wheel, which was used on the 1972 Mercedes S-class.

In contrast to the production of a standard 'cast' wheel, forged wheels such as Fuchs endure a much more complex engineering and construction process to ensure maximum strength and minimum weight. Proprietary to Otto Fuchs AG, this process is completed in 6 steps. Under a force of 4,000 tonnes, a cast aluminium block is initially forged into a rotationally symmetrical piece. Next, a general facia styling is applied to each disc through a forging force of 7,000 tonnes, and ventilation holes are stamped out to match the final design. Finally, the forged aluminium piece is fused with a lightweight barrel per desired width specifications, and the resulting wheel is subject to a lengthy process of turning, drilling, deburring and painting.

Today, each Fuchs wheel is made using a proprietary concoction of premium metals. Utilizing an alloy base of 97% pure aluminium, the remaining 3% of the wrought alloy is added specifically for strength and weight saving properties. The majority of these come in the form of magnesium and silicon, with approximate contents by weight of 1.3% and 1% respectively. When added to pure alloy in conjunction with one another, magnesium and pure silicon increase strength greatly. Additionally, chromium, titanium and manganese are also added, ranging from 0.1% to 1% by weight of the resulting alloy, to further increase strength and improve recrystallisation resilience.

== Early variations ==
For the original Porsche 911S, there were three variations of the lightweight Fuchs wheel based on model year; a 15x4.5 inch size is the rarest from the 1967 model, slowly growing to 15x5.5 inches for 1968, and 15x6 inches for 1969. Coined the '6R', this 6-inch wide 'deep-dish' variant was originally produced for the front of the extremely limited 1967 Porsche 911R race car. However, after August 1968, this variant evolved into two versions available as part of the 911S catalog, distinguishable by being either 'with or without hearts' depending on the experience on the valve stem.

For the rear of the 911R, the '6R' rim was manufactured in a 7 inch variant denoted the '7R'; which can easily be distinguished from the latter 7 inch Fuchs wheels by its 49 mm offset, vs the latter having a 23.3mm offset. This early 7R wheel was available on street-driven 911s until 1971, and is sought-after today due to the width and diameter combination allowing the use of many modern day tires.

Coinciding with the release of the 911 Carrera RS, a 15x8 inch variant was introduced alongside the continued manufacture of 6 and 7 inch widths. Available only on the 1973 model year of the Carrera RS, the 15x8 inch Fuchs wheel commands a large price premium in today's market as it is the only historically correct wheel for cars of this year, and was only produced for a 6-month period.

Potentially the most usable wheel for modern recreations of the 60's and 70's 911 models are the 15x9 inch and 15x11 inch Fuchs variants from the 1973–74 911RSR race car. Although not street legal at the time, they are more common today due to the availability of modern day tyres.

== Current production ==
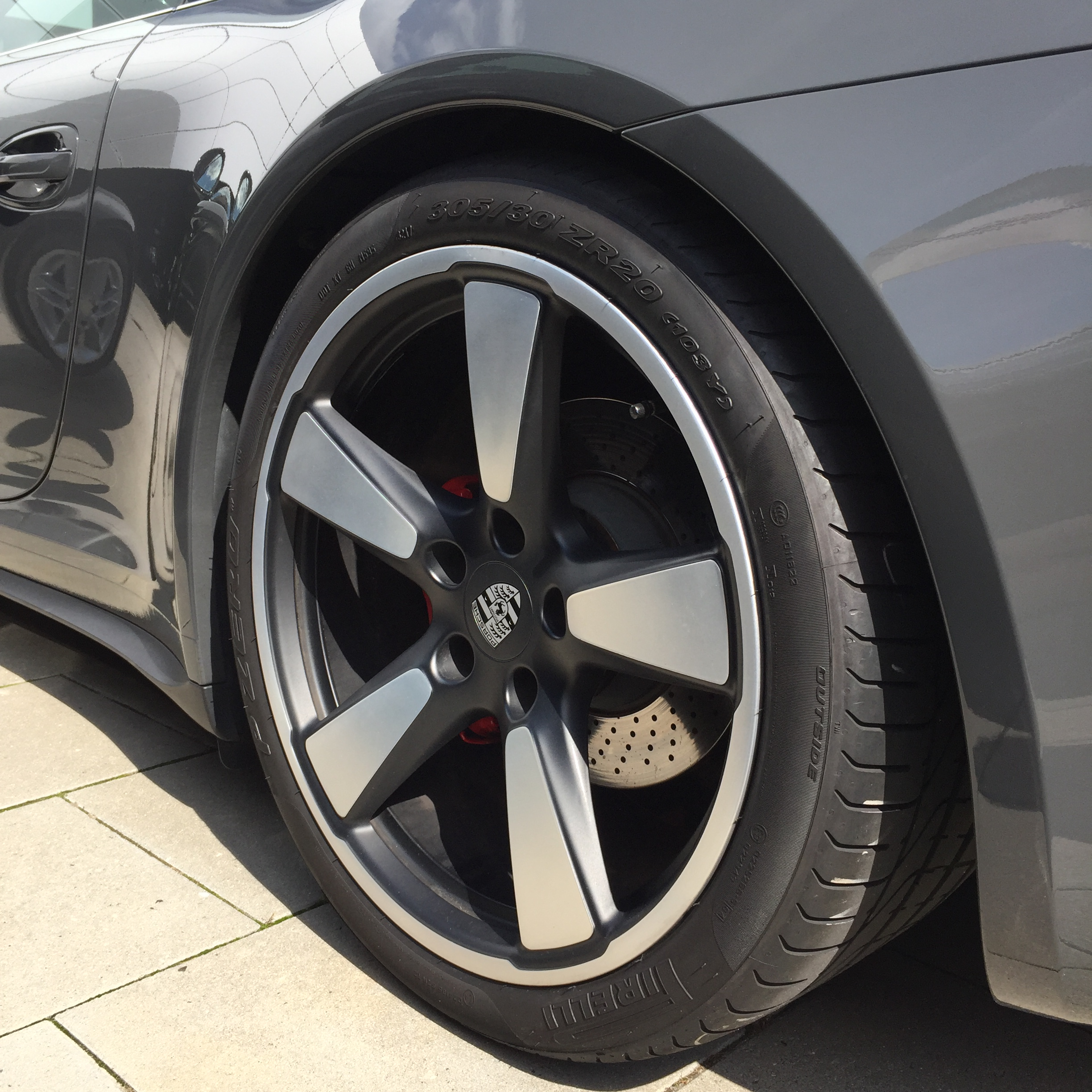
The modernized Fuchs design for the 2022 Porsche 911 992 Sport Classic

Today, over 2.5 million forged wheels are made at Otto Fuchs per annum for manufacturers such as Alfa Romeo, BMW, Ferrari, Rolls-Royce, Volkswagen, Mercedes-Benz and Porsche. There are currently over 400 tooling options available depending on size and surface finish.

Vintage specification Fuchs wheels are still currently produced in limited batches, and available through the Porsche Classic program to suit most 911 models from 1965 to the early 2000s. More recently, the 2010 Porsche Sport Classic of the 997 generation was sold with a 19-inch recreation of the iconic alloy wheel, however due to the limited run of only 250 vehicles, these wheels remain a hot commodity for owners looking to retrofit other modern 911s.

In addition to Porsche, Otto Fuchs continues to design and manufacture wheels for other German manufacturers, including Mercedes-Benz. For their flagship front-engine sports car the AMG GT, Fuchs designed forged wheels were available as an option in the 'exclusive' range from August 2014. One of the only Fuchs models to be available in either a brushed-aluminium or matte black finish, the multi-spoke design has the largest footprint of any road-going Fuchs wheels produced; 19 x 9 inches on the front, and 20 x 11 inches on the rear.

== Vehicles featuring Fuchs Wheels as standard equipment ==
Manufacturer	Model	Year	Description
Porsche	911S	1967	A successor to the 356, Porsche's first iteration of their flagship rear-engined sports car featured the first production forged Fuchs Wheels, designed in a 'cloverleaf' pattern.
Porsche	914	1969	A collaboration in a collaboration with Volkswagen, the 914 was Porsches entry-level, mid-engined sports car of the last 1960s. Over 120,000 models were built featuring Fuchs 4-spoke clover wheels, similar to the 911 of the era.
NSU	RO 80	1969	An executive sedan featuring a twin Wankel rotor engine, and Fuchs clover 5-spoke wheels, the NSU RO 80 was Europe's first and last rotary car, due to its unreliability and fuel inefficiency.
Mercedes-Benz	S-Class	1972	The first of the flagship Mercedes-Benz series, the 1972 S-Class featured a new 'baroque' style by Fuchs, growing from the 'clover-style' to market their designs for more luxurious vehicles.
Opel	Kadett GT/E	1975	A sporty coupe with two-tone paint, the Opel Kadett featured multi-spoke Fuchs Wheels from the factory, which were later carried into motorsport through rally homologations of the car.
BMW	7-Series	1977	BMW's rival to the Mercedes S-Class, the 7-Series, also gained a multi-spoke Fuchs Wheel in the late 1970s.
Audi	Ur-Quattro	1980	The first of many models with Audi's now successful 'Quattro' all-wheel-drive technology, the Ur-quattro featured an aluminium Fuchs which was inspired by its rally pedigree.
Mercedes-Benz	190E	1982	A 'baby brother' to the E-Class, the Mercedes-Benz 190 was released in 1982 with a new 'fan' design Fuchs Wheel', which was inspired by 'turbo-fan' racing wheels of the era.
Audi	A8	1994	Audi's answer to the BMW 7-Series and Mercedes S-Class, the A8 saloon displayed its elegance on multi-spoke Fuchs Wheels ahead of its FAA debut in March 1994.
BMW	E46 M3	2000	The 4th generation BMW M3 was released in 2000, featuring a 3.2l six-cylinder engine, and was the first car to feature a 'bi-colour' forged Fuchs Wheel.
Porsche	997 Turbo	2006	Also featuring a two-tone forged Fuchs Wheel design as standard specification, the 997 generation Porsche 911 Turbo was one of the fastest cars released in 2006, with a 0–100 km/h time of 3.9 seconds.
Audi	R8	2007	The first generation Audi R8 was released in 2007, standard with a set of forged aluminium wheels to complement its entirely aluminium construction.
Rolls-Royce	Phantom	2008	The 5.3 metre long Rolls-Royce Phantom featured the largest Fuchs Wheels produced at the time, with a diameter of 21 inches.
Lamborghini	Gallardo	2009	A first foray into Italian super-cars, Fuchs supplied Lamborghini with the factory wheels for their first 'entry-level' car, the Gallardo.
BMW	i3	2013	The BMW i3 is the only electric car to be manufactured with forged Fuchs Wheels, with their lightweight construction and rigidity complementing the car's carbon fibre reinforced plastic (CFRP) chassis.
Mini	Cooper S	2014	The newly redesigned Mini Cooper S is equipped the smallest and lightest Fuchs Wheel currently in production, at 15 inches in diameter and weighing 4.95 kg each.
BMW	F82 M4	2015	The first M-car of the 4-Series range, the M4 has a 5-Spoke Fuchs forged wheel, available in a range of finishes including two-tone.
