= Nicholas Tse =

Hong Kong musician and actor (born 1980)

- 謝霆鋒
- Tse in 2024
- Pronunciation: Tse Ting-fung
- Born: 29 August 1980 (age 46); Kowloon, British Hong Kong
- Citizenship: Canada (1988–2021); Chinese (Hong Kong)
- Occupations: Actor; singer; songwriter; entrepreneur; chef; martial artist
- Years active: 1996–present
- Spouse: Cecilia Cheung (m. 2006; div. 2011)
- Partner: Faye Wong (2000–2003, 2014–present)
- Children: 2
- Parents: Patrick Tse (father); Deborah Lee (mother)
- Relatives: Jennifer Tse (sister)
- Musical career
- Also known as: Nic Tse, Lemon (檸檬)
- Origin: Hong Kong
- Genres: Rock; Cantopop; Mandopop
- Instruments: Vocals; guitar; hang; drums; piano
- Labels: Fitto; Emperor; Cosmo; Sony

Chinese name
- Traditional Chinese: 謝霆鋒
- Simplified Chinese: 谢霆锋
Transcriptions
Standard Mandarin
- Hanyu Pinyin: Xiè Tíngfēng
- IPA: [ɕjê tʰíŋ.fə́ŋ]
Yue: Cantonese
- Jyutping: Ze6 Ting4-fung1
- Hong Kong Romanisation: Tse Ting-fung
- IPA: [tsɛ˨ tʰɪŋ˩.fʊŋ˥]
- Website: nicholastse.hk

Nicholas Tse Ting-fung (born 29 August 1980) is a Hong Kong actor, singer, entrepreneur and TV chef. Tse debuted as a singer in 1996 before shifting his career focus to acting. He is known for starring in the films Metade Fumaca (1999), New Police Story (2004), Bodyguards and Assassins (2009), The Viral Factor (2012), and Raging Fire (2021), as well as the television series The Proud Twins (2005). For his role in The Stool Pigeon (2010), Tse won the Hong Kong Film Award for Best Actor, making him the first actor to have won in the three major acting categories, Best Actor, Best Supporting Actor, and Best New Performer, at the Hong Kong Film Awards.

Tse is the founder of Post Production Office, a Hong Kong–based special effects company. The company was acquired by Digital Domain in 2016, with Tse becoming chairman of Digital Domain in Greater China.

== Early life ==
Tse was born at St. Teresa's Hospital in Ma Tau Wai, Kowloon on 29 August 1980 to Hong Kong actor Patrick Tse (謝賢) and actress Deborah Lee (狄波拉). His younger sister is Jennifer Tse. Tse moved to Vancouver, Canada at eight. He attended St. George's School, Vancouver, where he was friends with Tablo. They were expelled together for fighting with a racist bully. Tse moved back with his family to Hong Kong, where he attended Hong Kong International School for one year before dropping out in grade 10 due to excessive media attention. He moved to Phoenix, Arizona, to finish his middle school, but was expelled after one year for his academic underperformance. He then moved to Vancouver before returning to Hong Kong. In 1996, at 16, he studied at Tokyo Music Institute. (Note: According to Tse, he studied at Tokyo Music Institute (東京音楽学院) for a year, but various media reported that he studied in Tokyo for either 3 or 6 months. It's commonly misreported that he studied at Tokyo College of Music (東京音楽大学).) In 2021, Tse announced that he had applied to renounce his Canadian citizenship amid reports that ethnic Chinese celebrities holding foreign passports might face blacklisting by the Chinese government; however, it remains unclear whether his application was approved.

== Career ==
=== Music ===
In 1997, partly to help clear the debts incurred by his father, Tse signed a record deal with the Fitto label, which would become Emperor Entertainment Group, and released his first album, My Attitude, to runaway success. He won the Most Popular New Artist Award at the 1997 Jade Solid Gold Best Ten Music Awards Presentation. In 2000 and 2001, Tse released two popular albums, Viva and Jade Butterfly (玉蝴蝶). In 2002, Tse received the World's Best Chinese Artist award at the 2002 World Music Award for Jade Butterfly. In April 2025, Tse became the first Chinese singer to hold concerts at Kai Tak Stadium.

=== Acting ===
Tse's notable films include Young and Dangerous: The Prequel (1998), Gen-X Cops (1999), New Police Story (2004), and Invisible Target (2007). Tse's performance in Bodyguards and Assassins (2009) earned him the Best Supporting Actor at the 4th Asian Film Awards. In 2011, Tse won the Hong Kong Film Award for Best Actor for The Stool Pigeon (2010).

Tse's notable TV dramas include Aiming High (1998), The Monkey King: Quest for the Sutra (2002), and The Proud Twins (2004). Tse also lent his voice to the Hong Kong versions of animation films A Bug's Life (1998) and Lotus Lantern (1999).

Tse learned martial arts for the screen from Jackie Chan and Chung Chi Li for films such as Gen-X-Cops and Invisible Target. He worked with Donnie Yen in the martial arts film Dragon Tiger Gate. Tse is a Wing Chun practitioner, trained by fellow actor and friend Philip Ng.

=== Cooking ===
Tse became a TV chef in 2014, when he launched his food travelogue show Chef Nic. In 2015, he opened a cookie bakery in Hong Kong. In 2016, he launched his own lifestyle and food brand Chef Nic (鋒味). On 28 October 2016, Tse was honoured as the first "Friend of Michelin" for his positive contribution to the gastronomic scene through his work. On 30 November 2017, Tse prepared the dessert course for A Night Among the Stars, a seven course gala dinner with Michelin-star chefs Alain Ducasse, Kwong Wai-keung, Tam Kwok-fung, Fabrice Vulin, Hidemichi Seki, and Noah Sandoval. In 2025, Tse joined the Tencent cooking show The Divine Dish as a judge, which drew controversy over alleged plagiarism of the Netflix show Culinary Class Wars.

== Personal life ==
Tse’s earliest acknowledged relationship was with an Italian classmate, whom he met at the age of 15. The relationship ended the same year when Tse went to the United States to study. Heartbroken, he purchased his first second-hand guitar and began writing songs. In 1996, at the age of 16, Tse dated Irene, the daughter of a Canadian businessman; the relationship ended the next year. However, as Tse began taking singing lessons from music teacher Tai See-chung since 14, and later dated Tai's daughter, Wancy Tai, she claimed that she was Tse's first girlfriend.

In 1997, Tse began a relationship with singer Bondy Chiu, which lasted approximately three and a half years. At the end of 1999, Tse entered a relationship with singer Candy Lo, which lasted a few months. Tse had an on-and-off relationship with singer Faye Wong from 2000 to 2003, which ended when Cecilia Cheung became involved. In September 2006, Tse announced that he had married Cecilia Cheung in Pamalican, Philippines. They have two sons: Lucas (謝振軒), born on 2 August 2007, and Quintus (謝振南), born on 12 May 2010. The couple divorced in 2011. In 2014, Tse rekindled his relationship with Faye Wong.

== Controversies ==
=== Car crash cover-up ===
In the early morning of 23 March 2002, Tse crashed his Ferrari 360 Modena in Hong Kong Central. A driver employed by Emperor Entertainment Group, Tse's agency, turned himself in to the police, but a subsequent investigation by Hong Kong's Independent Commission Against Corruption (ICAC) revealed that the story was fabricated, involving three other men and a police officer. Officer Lau Chi-Wai was sentenced to six months in prison. Tse spent two weeks in prison and was sentenced to 240 hours of community service for obstruction of justice.

The incident severely damaged his popularity in Hong Kong, and he subsequently shifted the focus of his career to mainland China. In a 2012 interview, Tse said:

It was a major blow in my life. To this day, I still maintain that I didn't do it. The Hong Kong government wanted to make an example of me. If you look at the case files today, lawyers will tell you that the verdict was wrong. I never even saw a police officer, yet I was accused of having someone take the blame for me. Yes, at three in the morning, I made a mistake and crashed the car. But I had a seven o'clock flight to Thailand, and in the intervening hours, the only person I saw was Cecilia Cheung. [...] But never mind. There's nothing I can do about it now. In fact, I'm rather grateful for the experience.

=== Assault on paparazzi ===
Tse had his share of brush-ups with "paparazzi" in his early years. A photographer of Sudden Weekly magazine accused Tse of hitting him outside a restaurant in Taiwan, bruising his nose and elbow. Although Tse denied the assault charge, there was a settlement in July 2002.

=== Reckless driving ===
In 2002, Tse was fined HK$7,000 and had his driving license suspended for a year after he pleaded guilty to two separate charges of speeding. In 2003, Tse crashed his Toyota Camry into Wan Chai train station. He was banned from driving for six months and fined HK$4,000 for reckless driving.

== Discography ==
Cantonese albums

- My Attitude (1997)
- Horizons (1998)
- Believe (1999)
- Zero Distance (2000)
- Viva (2000)
- Senses (2001)
- Jade Butterfly (2001)
- Me (2002)
- Reborn (2003)
- One Inch Closer (2005)

Mandarin albums

- Grateful for Your Love '99 (1999)
- Understand (2000)
- The Prophecy (2001)
- Listen Up (2004)
- Release (2005)
- Last (2009)
- Chef Nic (2015)

== Filmography ==
=== Film ===
| Year | English title | Chinese title | Role | Notes/Ref. |
|---|---|---|---|---|
| 1998 | Young and Dangerous: The Prequel | 新古惑仔之少年激鬥篇 | Chan Ho-nam | Hong Kong Film Award for Best New Performer |
| 1999 | Gen-X Cops | 特警新人類 | Jack | |
| 1999 | A Man Called Hero | 中華英雄 | Sword Hua | |
| 1999 | Metade Fumaca | 半支煙 | Smokey | Nominated – Hong Kong Film Award for Best Original Film Song |
| 1999 | Street Angels | 少女党 | | |
| 1999 | The Mirror | 怪談之魔鏡 | Siu-ming | |
| 2000 | Twelve Nights | 十二夜 | Kit | |
| 2000 | Winner Takes All | 大贏家 | Ferrari | |
| 2000 | Time and Tide | 順流逆流 | Tyler Yim | |
| 2001 | Comic King | 漫畫風雲 | Knife | |
| 2001 | Master Q 2001 | 老夫子2001 | Fred/Howard | |
| 2001 | Heroes in Love | 戀愛起義 | | Writer/co-director only |
| 2001 | My Schoolmate, the Barbarian | 我的野蠻同學 | Stone | |
| 2001 | 2002 | | Inspector Tide Yau | |
| 2002 | Tiramisu | 戀愛行星 | Ko Fung | |
| 2002 | Demi-Haunted | 魂魄唔齊 | Chang Ho-fung | |
| 2003 | The Medallion | 飛龍再生 | Waiter | Cameo |
| 2004 | Jade Goddess of Mercy | 玉觀音 | Maojie | |
| 2004 | Enter the Phoenix | 大佬愛美麗 | Cock Head | Cameo |
| 2004 | Moving Targets | 2004新紮師兄 | Cheung Wai-kit | |
| 2004 | New Police Story | 新警察故事 | Frank Cheng | Hundred Flowers Award for Best Supporting Actor |
| 2005 | A Chinese Tall Story | 情癲大聖 | Tripitaka | |
| 2005 | The Promise | 無極 | Duke Wuhuan | |
| 2006 | McDull, the Alumni | 春田花花同學會 | Old man in toilet | |
| 2006 | Dragon Tiger Gate | 龍虎門 | Tiger Wong | |
| 2006 | Rob-B-Hood | 寶貝計劃 | Nicholas | Cameo |
| 2006 | The Heavenly Kings | 四大天王 | Himself | Cameo |
| 2007 | Invisible Target | 男兒本色 | Detective Chan Chun | |
| 2008 | Beast Stalker | 證人 | Sergeant Tong Fei | |
| 2008 | Storm Rider Clash of the Evils | 風雲決 | Striding Cloud | |
| 2009 | The Storm Warriors | 風雲II | Heartless | |
| 2009 | Bodyguards and Assassins | 十月圍城 | Deng Sidi | Asian Film Award for Best Supporting Actor; Hong Kong Film Award for Best Supporting Actor; Nominated – Golden Horse Award for Best Supporting Actor |
| 2010 | Hot Summer Days | 全城熱戀熱辣辣 | Wai | |
| 2010 | The Stool Pigeon | 綫人 | Ghost Jr. | Hong Kong Film Award for Best Actor |
| 2011 | Shaolin | 新少林寺 | Tsao Man | Nominated – Hong Kong Film Award for Best Supporting Actor |
| 2011 | Treasure Inn | 財神客棧 | Master Kung | |
| 2012 | The Viral Factor | 逆戰 | Man Yeung | Nominated – Golden Horse Award for Best Actor |
| 2012 | The Bullet Vanishes | 消失的子彈 | Captain Guo Zhui | |
| 2013 | The Midas Touch | 超級經理人 | Himself | Cameo |
| 2014 | As the Light Goes Out | 救火英雄 | Sam | |
| 2014 | From Vegas to Macau | 賭城風雲 | Cool | |
| 2014 | But Always | 一生一世 | Zhao Yongyuan | |
| 2015 | 12 Golden Ducks | 12金鴨 | Ma Chi-kin | |
| 2015 | The Spirit of the Swords | 情劍 | | Edited version of The Spirit of Sword |
| 2016 | I Love That Crazy Little Thing | 那件瘋狂的小事叫愛情 | Ouyang Qi | |
| 2016 | Heartfall Arises | 驚天破 | John Ma | |
| 2017 | Cook Up a Storm | 決戰食神 | Sky Ko | |
| 2018 | Air Strike | 大轟炸 | Lei Tao | Special appearance |
| 2019 | Undercover Punch and Gun | 潛行者 | Officer He | |
| 2021 | Raging Fire | 怒火 | Yau Kong-ngo | |
| 2021 | Good Night Beijing | 曾經相愛的我們 | Chef | |
| 2024 | Customs Frontline | 海關戰線 | Chow Ching-lai | Also action director |
| 2026 | Blades of the Guardians | 镖人 | Diting | |
| TBA | Raging Havoc | 怒火漫延 | Chow | Also action director |
| TBA | | 無限任務 | | |
| TBA | New Police Story 2 | 新警察故事2 | Frank Cheng | Also director |

=== Television ===
| Year | English title | Chinese title | Role | Notes |
|---|---|---|---|---|
| 1998 | Aiming High | 撻出愛火花 | Chiu Ka Chun | TV debut |
| 2002 | The Monkey King: Quest for the Sutra | 齊天大聖孫悟空 | Chung Kwai | cameo |
| 2002 | Secretly Loving You | 偷偷愛上你 | Himself | cameo |
| 2003 | Hearts of Fencing | 當四葉草碰上劍尖時 | Himself | cameo |
| 2005 | The Proud twins | 小魚兒與花無缺 | Hua Wu Que | |
| 2007 | Wing Chun | 詠春 | Leung Bik | |
| 2007 | Big Shot | 大人物 | Yang Fan | |
| 2007 | The Spirit of Sword | 浣花洗劍錄 | Hu Yan Da Zang | |
| 2012 | Jian Xia Qing Yuan | 劍俠情緣 | Ye Fan / Gu Lang | |
| 2012 | America's Next Top Model, Cycle 18 | | a judge and also action director in one of the episodes | |
| 2013 | The Next Magic | 下一個奇跡 | Liang Hai En | |
| 2013 | Super Boy (2013) | 2013快樂男聲 | one of the main judges in the Finale | |
| 2014 | Chef Nic | 12道鋒味 | the show's on-camera chef | a Chinese food travelogue show |
| 2015 | Chef Nic 2 | 12道鋒味 2 | the show's on-camera chef | a Chinese food travelogue show |
| 2016 | Chef Nic 3 | 12道鋒味 3 | the show's on-camera chef | a Chinese food travelogue show |
| 2016 | Lady Bees | 蜜蜂少女队 | one of the 2 coaches | a women's group music cultivation reality show |
| 2017 | Chef Nic 2017 | 鋒味 2017 | the show's on-camera chef | a Chinese food travelogue show |
| 2018 | Chef Nic 2018 | 鋒味 2018 | the show's on-camera chef | a Chinese food travelogue show |
| 2018 | Celebrity Chef: East vs West | 名廚爭鋒 | the show's on-camera chef | a Chinese food competition show |
| 2018 | Sing! China | 中国好声音 | one of the 4 judges | The Chinese Voice |
| 2020 | Me to Us | 我们的乐队 | one of the 3 judges | band forming reality show |
| 2020 | Sing! China | 中国好声音2020 | one of the 4 judges | the Chinese Voice |
| 2021 | Chef Nic • People’s Palate | 百姓的味道 | Food Taste Officer &. Producer | a Chinese food travelogue show |
