= Chef Nic =

2014–2022 Chinese TV series

- Genre: Food; Travel
- Starring: Nicholas Tse
- Country of origin: China
- Original languages: Mandarin; Cantonese; English
- No. of seasons: 6
- No. of episodes: 70

Production
- Executive producers: Nicholas Tse; Mani Fok
- Production location: Full list
- Running time: 62–75 minutes
- Production companies: Emperor Entertainment Group; Chef Nic Holdings

Original release
- Network: Zhejiang Television (1–5); Jiangsu Television (6)
- Release: 12 July 2014 – 28 January 2022

Chef Nic (Chinese: 十二道鋒味) is a Chinese food travelogue show starring Nicholas Tse and featuring different celebrity guests per episode. It was aired from 12 July 2014 to 28 January 2022.

== Episodes ==
=== Season 1 ===
Ep.Num.	Guest(s)	Location(s)	Airdate
1	Fan Bingbing	Paris	July 12, 2014
2	Nick Cheung; Jaycee Chan	Australia	July 19, 2014
3	Zhao Wei; Bibi Zhou	France; Beijing	July 26, 2014
4	Jackie Chan; Jaycee Chan	Italy	August 2, 2014
5	Patrick Tse; Michelle Chen	Spain	August 9, 2014
6	Patrick Tse; Charlene Choi	Spain	August 16, 2014
7	Gwei Lun-mei	Singapore	August 23, 2014
8	Joey Yung	Switzerland	August 30, 2014
9	Lin Dan; Hai Qing	Inner Mongolia; Yingkou; Beijing	September 6, 2014
10	Angelababy	Macau	September 13, 2014
11	Eason Chan; Michelle Bai	Hong Kong	September 20, 2014
12	Charlene Choi; Wen Zhang	Mount Mogan, Deqing; Shanghai	September 27, 2014

=== Season 2 ===
Season 2 added regular cast members including William Chan, Yu Quan, and Ma Su. Wang Taili joined from episode 8, while Xiao Wang and Yi Yi joined in the last episode. Mani Fok, CEO of EEG, replaced Chan in the second episode due to his acting schedule.

All 12 episodes are available for streaming on the main website.

Ep.Num.	Guest(s)	Location(s)	Airdate
1	Tong Liya	Huairou, Beijing	August 1, 2015
2	Tiffany Tang	Huangshan, Anhui	August 8, 2015
3	Yang Mi	Huangshan, Anhui	August 15, 2015
4	Jing Boran; Qin Hailu	Foshan, Guangdong	August 22, 2015
5	Leo Ku; Ocean Hai; Liu Yanzhi	Foshan, Guangdong	August 29, 2015
6	Sun Nan; Summer Momoko	Jianshui, Yunnan	September 12, 2015
7	Li Yundi; Zanilia Zhao	Jianshui, Yunnan	September 19, 2015
8	Sandy Lam	Shanghai	September 26, 2015
9	Phoenix Legend; Box; Jessica Jung	Nanxun, Huzhou, Zhejiang	October 3, 2015
10	Zhang Jingchu	Zigong, Sichuan	October 10, 2015
11	Li Yuchun; Tina Tang	Chongqing	October 17, 2015
12	Raymond Lam	Dongshan Ridge, Wanning, Hainan	October 24, 2015

=== Season 3 ===
Ep.Num.	Guest(s)	Location(s)	Airdate
1	Shu Qi; Zhou Dongyu; Sandra Ma	Sanxing, Yilan; Keelung; Taipei	September 10, 2016
2	Patrick Tse; Michelle Yeoh	Kilimanjaro	September 17, 2016
3	Ethan Juan	Thailand	September 24, 2016
4	Jolin Tsai; Albert Yeung	Tokyo	October 1, 2016
5	Donnie Yen; Yuen Woo-ping	Kyoto	October 8, 2016
6	Jam Hsiao; Mani Fok; Song Ke	Finland	October 15, 2016
7	Twins	Seoul	October 22, 2016
8	Patrick Tse; Michelle Yeoh	South Africa	October 29, 2016
9	Li Ronghao; Sandra Ng	Lake Tai, Suzhou	November 5, 2016
10	Eric Tsang; Stephanie Che; Wang Taili; Chen Xiaoqing; Tiffany Tang; Michelle Bai; Jelly Lin	Hong Kong; Guangzhou; Hawaii	November 12, 2016
11	Ma Dong; Feng Tang; Joey Yung; Maggie Cheung	London	November 19, 2016
12	Maggie Cheung; William Chan	London	November 26, 2016

=== Season 4 ===
Ep.Num.	Guest(s)	Location(s)	Airdate
1	Zheng Danni; Wu Zhehan; Li Yitong; Zeng Yanfen; Hu Xiaohui; Han Jiale; Mani Fok; André Chiang	Shanghai	December 9, 2017
2	Leanne Li; Wong Cho-lam	Shangri-La, Yunnan	December 16, 2017
3	Jackson Wang	Macau	December 23, 2017
4	William Chan; Dee Hsu	Hong Kong	December 30, 2017
5	William Chan; Dee Hsu	Sham Shui Po	January 5, 2018
6	Gillian Chung; Laurinda Ho	Yangzhou	January 13, 2018
7	Aarif Rahman; Fu Yuanhui	Shanghai	January 19, 2018
8	Joey Yung; Ming Peng	Phuket	January 27, 2018
9	G.E.M.	New Zealand	February 3, 2018
10	Twins	Parma	February 10, 2018
11	Stephen Fung; André Chiang	Norway	February 17, 2018
12	Ethan Juan; André Chiang	Norway; North Pole	February 24, 2018

=== Season 5 ===
Ep.Num.	Guest(s)	Location(s)	Airdate
1	Ariel Lin	Saint-Petersburg	November 24, 2018
2	Daniel Wu	Mykonos	December 8, 2018
3	Jane Zhang	Chengdu, Sichuan	December 15, 2018
4	Victoria Song	Prague	December 22, 2018
5	Patrick Tse; Liza Wang; Zhang Yishan	Shunde, Foshan, Guangdong	December 29, 2018
6	Charmaine Sheh	Istanbul	January 5, 2019
7	Janine Chang	Taipei	January 12, 2019
8	Will Pan	Xiamen, Fujian	January 19, 2019
9	G.E.M.	Phnom Penh	January 26, 2019
10	Charlene Choi; JJ Lin	Hong Kong	February 2, 2019
11	Bai Yu	Xi'an, Shaanxi	February 9, 2019
12	Mani Fok; Jay Chou	Tokyo	February 16, 2019

=== Season 6 ===
Ep.Num.	Guest(s)	Location(s)	Airdate
1	Su Bingtian	Yanbian	November 19, 2021
2	Gao Yuanyuan	Shanghai	November 26, 2021
3	Tenzing Tsondu	Litang, Sichuan	December 3, 2021
4	Tenzing Tsondu	Litang, Sichuan	December 10, 2021
5	Yang Chaoyue	Qiannan	December 17, 2021
6	No guest	Fujian	December 24, 2021
7	Gong Lijiao	Yunnan	January 7, 2022
8	Miriam Yeung	Chaoshan, Guangdong	January 14, 2022
9	Telepathy	Nanjing	January 21, 2022
10	Hua Chenyu	Wuhan, Hubei	January 28, 2022
