= Good Night Beijing =

- Directed by: Jaycee Chan, Zhang Xiaolei
- Written by: Leo Zhang
- Produced by: Leo Zhang
- Starring: Chen Bolin; Amber Kuo; Eric Tsang; Nicholas Tse; Eric Moo; Jaycee Chan; Jackie Chan
- Edited by: Jian Cui
- Production company: Beijing United Power Films
- Release date: 10 December 2021
- Running time: 90 minutes
- Country: China
- Language: Mandarin

Good Night Beijing (Chinese: 曾经相爱的我们) is a 2021 Chinese romantic comedy-drama film directed by Jaycee Chan and Zhang Xiaolei, theatrically released on 10 December 2021.

== Plot ==
Two strange people, man Alan (Chen Bolin) and woman Meng Jie (Amber Kuo), meet and fall in love.

== Cast ==
- Chen Bolin as Alan
- Amber Kuo as Meng Jie
- Eric Tsang as Chen Zong
- Nicholas Tse as V Dian Da Chu
- Eric Moo
- Jaycee Chan
- Jackie Chan as Chen Shu

== Filming ==
Jaycee announced that he has completed his directorial debut in January 2018.
