= Secrets of the Furious Five =

2008 American short film

- Original poster
- Directed by: Raman Hui
- Written by: Paul McEvoy; Todd Berger
- Produced by: Karen Foster
- Starring: Jack Black; Dustin Hoffman; David Cross; Randall Duk Kim; Jessica DiCicco; Max Koch; Tara Strong; Jaycee Chan
- Edited by: John Venzon
- Music by: Henry Jackman; Hans Zimmer; John Powell
- Production companies: DreamWorks Animation; Reel FX; Film Roman
- Distributed by: Paramount Home Entertainment
- Release dates: November 11, 2008 (companion DVD release); February 26, 2009 (NBC broadcast); March 24, 2009 (separate DVD release)
- Running time: 24 minutes
- Country: United States
- Language: English
- Budget: $10 million

Secrets of the Furious Five (also known as Kung Fu Panda: Secrets of the Furious Five) is a 2008 American animated short film produced by DreamWorks Animation that serves as a spin-off to the animated feature film, Kung Fu Panda (2008), and appears on a companion disc of the original film's deluxe DVD release. It was broadcast on NBC February 26, 2009, and became available as a separate DVD.

The film has a framing story of Po the Dragon Warrior (in computer animation) telling the stories of his comrades in arms, the Furious Five, who are depicted in 2D cel animation, similar to the opening and end credits of the original film.

The only actors from the film to reprise their roles in this short were Jack Black as Po, Dustin Hoffman as Master Shifu, David Cross as Crane, and Randall Duk Kim as Master Oogway. Angelina Jolie, Lucy Liu, Jackie Chan and Seth Rogen do not reprise their roles, mainly because their related characters are depicted as their younger selves.

In this short, Monkey is voiced by Jaycee Chan, son of Jackie Chan. Jaycee Chan also voiced Crane in the Cantonese version of the original film. Production of the film was outsourced to Reel FX Creative Studios, which worked on CG animation, and to Film Roman, which worked on traditionally animated sequences.

== Plot ==
Master Shifu instructs Po on how to teach an introductory kung fu lesson to a group of rambunctious bunny children. Po tries to teach the children that the true meaning of kung fu is "excellence of self". To illustrate his point, he explains the Furious Five's individual backstories, and the basic philosophical concepts that enabled them to be great kung fu masters.

Mantis, in his youth, was a petulantly impatient warrior, prone to jumping to conclusions and making impulsive decisions. After this habit got him captured by crocodile bandits, the lengthy wait that Mantis was forced to endure in his prison cage taught him patience and he was able to use this to play dead long enough to ambush his captors.

Viper was born without venomous fangs. Her father, Great Master Viper, who relied on his venom to protect their village, believed that she could never be a warrior like him, causing Viper to grow up shy and timid. One night during a festival, Great Master Viper encountered a gorilla bandit and broke his fangs on the gorilla's special poison-proof armor. Seeing her father in peril, Viper found the courage to fight the bandit and defeat him with her ribbon dancing skills.

Crane was the self-deprecating janitor of the Lee Da Kung Fu Academy until the school’s star pupil Mei Ling encouraged him to seek enrollment. Crane's lifelong belief that he was too skinny to be an effective kung fu warrior caused him to lose his nerve at the tryouts. However, when he accidentally stumbled into the intense obstacle course to determine eligibility, he discovered the confidence to use his skinniness as an asset and pass the test.

Tigress was abandoned by her parents at the Bao Gu Orphanage. The other residents lived in fear of her because of her lack of control of her strength, so Shifu arrived to teach her the discipline that she needed to control her movements. After months of training, she demonstrated it by skillfully placing dominoes correctly with precision and agility before tipping them to form the symbol of yin and yang. The other children befriended her, but the adults who came to adopt children were still afraid of her, so Shifu decided to adopt her.

Monkey was humiliated in his youth, and grew up tormenting his village with pranks as revenge. Many challengers attempted to drive him away, but Monkey would always remove their pants to humiliate them. Master Oogway, who had a shell instead of pants, was able to subdue Monkey, and saved him from being crushed by a column knocked loose in their brawl. Noticing his reaction to being cared about, Oogway told Monkey that he could stay in the village as long as he would show others the compassion that he desired.

Shifu returns, anticipating to find a lack of progress, and is surprised to see he has underestimated Po's talents again. When the children ask Po how his first day of kung fu was, Po has a flashback to the unpleasant events he endured. (Note: As depicted in Kung Fu Panda (2008)) He smiles confidently and assures them that he loved it.

== Voice cast ==
- Jack Black as Po
- Dustin Hoffman as Shifu
- David Cross as Crane
- Randall Duk Kim as Oogway
- Elizabeth Ann Bennett as Ant / Bunny
- Jaycee Chan as Young Monkey
- Jim Cummings as Instructor
- Jessica DiCicco as Young Viper
- John DiMaggio as Crocodile Bandit #1 / Gorilla Bandit
- Carol Kane as Sheep
- Stephanie Kearin as Crocodile Bandit #2
- Max Koch as Young Mantis
- Stephanie Lemelin as Mei Ling
- Meredith Scott Lynn as Master Viper's Mom
- Tom Owens as Ladybug
- Eamon Pirruccello as Impatient Bunny
- Grace Rolek as Shy Bunny
- Will Shadley as Nerdy Bunny
- James Sie as Great Master Viper
- Tara Strong as Young Tigress

== Awards ==
Secrets of the Furious Five received eight nominations in the "Animated Television Production or Short Form" category at the 36th Annie Awards, of which it received four ("Character Animation", "Character Design", "Music" and "Production Design").
