= Invisible Target =

2007 Hong Kong film by Benny Chan

- Film poster
- Directed by: Benny Chan
- Written by: Benny Chan; Rams Ling; Melody Lui
- Produced by: Benny Chan
- Starring: Nicholas Tse; Jaycee Chan; Shawn Yue; Wu Jing
- Cinematography: Ko Chiu-lam; Anthony Pun
- Edited by: Yau Chi-wai
- Music by: Anthony Chue
- Production companies: Universe Entertainment; Sil-Metropole Organisation; Bona Film Group; Yinming Culture Communication Company Limited
- Distributed by: Universe Films Distribution Co. Ltd.
- Release date: 19 July 2007
- Running time: 129 minutes
- Country: Hong Kong
- Languages: Cantonese; Mandarin
- Box office: HK$13,232,308

Invisible Target (Chinese: 男兒本色) is a 2007 Hong Kong action film directed and produced by Benny Chan, who also wrote the screenplay with Rams Ling and Melody Lui. The film stars Nicholas Tse, Jaycee Chan and Shawn Yue as three police officers who are thrown together due to their backgrounds to bring down a gang of seven criminals led by Tien Yeng-seng (Wu Jing).

== Plot ==
An armoured truck carrying $100 million of cash is attacked by a criminal gang who call themselves the "Ronin Gang" with explosives as it stops at a traffic junction in front of a jewellery shop. All the security guards are shot dead except one, while responding police officers suffer serious casualties under the gunfire of the heavily armed gang members. The explosions also kill several civilians, including a lady in the shop. Six months later, the same gang reappears in Hong Kong, injuring a group of policemen, two critically, during a spot check. The dead woman in the jewellery shop is CID detective Chan Chun's fiancée, while the injured policemen are led by Trainee Inspector Carson Fong Yik-wai. Both officers vow revenge on the criminal gang.

Little Tiger, one of the gang members, is captured by Chan and is forced to lead the police to the gang's hideout. The gang appears and kills Tiger after a chase, while injuring Chan and several of his colleagues.

Wai King-ho is a rookie cop whose older brother, Wai King-tat, also a police officer, has been missing for an extended period of time. Deeply upset by police allegations that his brother has become part of the criminal gang while undercover, he is suspended from duty due to his connection to his now wanted brother, and later confronted by both Chan and Fong who demand his brother's whereabouts. They form an alliance after Wai is rescued by Chan and Fong in a fight at a nightclub.

It turns out that the surviving security guard is Ho Wing-keung, the manager of the security company, who colluded with the gang to rob the armoured truck. He is tracked down by the gang to a psychiatric hospital, where he feigned a mental breakdown to escape detection by the gang. Chan, Fong and Wai arrive at the hospital, but fail to stop his escape with the gang, which threatened his family to force him out. As the three pursue the gang, they run into an accident scene, where the gang shoots several police officers, hijacks a mini-bus with young children, and takes Wai as a hostage in the bus. Chan and Fong go after the bus with Ho in another car.

The gang members and the police officers engage in a lengthy confrontation, in which Wai's brother is revealed as an undercover cop; he is killed by gang member Ronin Tien Yeng-yee. Ho is killed by Tien Yeng-seng, Wai is left handcuffed to the bus with the children and a timed bomb, while Chan and Fong are forced to collect the stolen cash from the robbery's mastermind at a funfair at Tamar while chained to another timed bomb. Wai manages to free himself and rescue all the children, but discovers that the bomb is fake, suggesting that Ronin had no intention of harming the children. Chan and Fong approach a man with a luggage bag at the funfair as instructed, but the man turns out to be Chief Inspector Sam, who is leading an operation to nab the gang. Chan and Fong take Sam hostage and manage to free themselves from the bomb, while explodes harmlessly in a tent. In a secluded area, Chan and Fong explain their situation to Sam. It is then revealed that Sam is also colluding with the mastermind, and when he pulls a gun on Chan and Fong, the two throw him over a railing, killing him. Chan and Fong become suspects for the murder.

With the help of Fong's girlfriend Leung Hoi-lam from the Police Intelligence Department, Chan and Fong realise that the real mastermind is Senior Superintendent Cheung Man-yiu, who has orchestrated the armoured truck robbery, double crossed the gang, resulting in the death of three of their members, and made off with the loot, which he keeps hidden in a car in the Police Headquarters car park. The remaining four members of the criminal gang arrive at the Headquarters in a police van masquerading as police officers to get the money back, just before the arrival of Chan, Fong, and Wai. Senior Superintendent Mark Law Pui-keung begins to learn about the truth from data provided by Leung.

An extended showdown at the Police Headquarters ensues, resulting in the deaths of three criminals, multiple policemen including a Special Duties Unit squad, and Wai, who is beaten to death by Tien. Chan and Fong almost kill Tien in revenge, but at the last minute realise their duty as a police officer is to arrest, not kill. Cheung throws a bag of grenades, killing Tien in the explosion (along with the remaining money) while Chan and Fong escape with Wai's body. Cheung is later led to an ambulance by unsuspecting officers. He is subsequently shot dead by Chan and Fong when he tries to kill Law in another ambulance. Law lets Chan and Fong go, and they return to their police duties, but as a detective and a beat cop respectively. They also help take care of Wai's grandmother.

== Distribution ==
Film-based distributor The Weinstein Company picked up multi-territory rights to release Invisible Target in all English-speaking territories. Dragon Dynasty released a "two disc ultimate edition" DVD in the United States on 10 June 2008, which contains much of the same special features found on the Hong Kong releases. A Blu-ray Disc edition of the film by the same company was later released in August 2010.

== Critical reception ==
The film opened to generally mixed reviews. Writing in Muse magazine, Perry Lam found that 'there is eloquence to the way Benny Chan tells his story,' but ultimately criticizes the film for 'fail[ing] to deliver'.

== Cast ==
- Nicholas Tse as Chan Chun
- Jaycee Chan as Officer PC Wai King-ho
- Shawn Yue as Inspector Carson Fong Yik-wai
- Wu Jing as Tien Yeng-seng
- Elanne Kong as Leung Hoi-lam
- Dominic Lam as Senior Superintendent Cheung Man-yiu
- Sam Lee as Ho Wing-keung
- Mark Cheng as Senior Superintendent Mark Law Pui-keung
- Andy On as Ronin Tien Yeng-yee
- Lisa Lu as Yan Lu
- Ken Lo as Inspector Wong Kam-ming
- Lam Suet as Loan Shark Cheng
- Deep Ng as Ng Ho-hong
- Philip Ng as Tiger
- Samuel Pang as Gangster O.D
- Kenny Wong as Sam Mok
- Kwok Fung as Wai King-tat and Wai King ho’s father
- Angelina Lo as Wai King-tat and Wai King-ho’s mother
- Anson Leung as Police Officer Chun
- Tommy Yuen as Gangster On
- Chan Tat-kwong as Cheng's bodyguard
- Liu Zi-yan as Ho Ka-yee
- Aaron Kwok as Officer Wai King-tat, Wai King-ho's older brother (picture only)

== See also ==
- Nicholas Tse filmography
- Wu Jing filmography
