= 2002 Australian Nations Cup Championship =

The 2002 Australian Nations Cup Championship was CAMS sanctioned Australian motor racing title open to GT type cars complying with both Group 3E Series Production Car regulations as published by CAMS and Nations Cup regulations as published by Procar Australia. The title, which was the third Australian Nations Cup Championship, was won by Jim Richards driving a Porsche 911 GT3 Cup.

== Schedule ==
The championship was contested over an eight-round series.

Round	Circuit	State	Date	Format
1	Adelaide Parklands Circuit	South Australia	16 & 17 March	Three races
2	Symmons Plains International Raceway	Tasmania	7 April	Two races
3	Oran Park	New South Wales	5 May	Three races
4	Winton Motor Raceway	Victoria	23 June	Three races
5	Queensland Raceway	Queensland	14 July	Three races
6	Wakefield Park	New South Wales	11 August	Three races
7	Phillip Island Grand Prix Circuit	Victoria	22 September	Three races
8	Surfers Paradise Street Circuit	Queensland	27 October	Three races

== Points system ==
Outright points were awarded on a 60, 55, 50, 45, 40, 36, 32, 28, 24, 20, 17, 14, 11, 8, 6, 5, 4, 3, 2, 1 basis to the top twenty placegetters in each race with an additional point awarded to the driver gaining pole position for the round.

The same scale was used to award points in Group Two, which was restricted to models nominated as Group Two in PROCAR Australia's Vehicle Eligibility Schedule.

== Results ==
Championship results were as follows:

Position	Driver	No.	Car	Entrant	Ade	Sym	Ora	Win	Que	Wak	Phi	Sur	Total
1	Jim Richards	1	Porsche 911 GT3 Cup	OAMPS	140	105	150	160	165	150	160	181	1211
2	Geoff Morgan	4	Chrysler Viper ACR	Geoffrey Morgan	145	105	160	121	170	165	181	130	1177
3	John Bowe	888	Ferrari 360 N-GT; Ferrari 360 Challenge	Prancing Horse Racing	171	121	171	155	106	181	77	105	1087
4	Paul Stokell	2	Lamborghini Diablo GTR	Team Lamborghini Australia	175	-	60	180	-	130	155	155	855
5	Kevin Bell	37	Porsche 911 GT3 Cup	BNT G-Tech	84	85	116	108	116	100	104	112	825
6	Peter Fitzgerald	3	Porsche 911 GT3 Cup	Falken Tyres	116	-	-	135	140	104	125	140	760
7	Tony Quinn	5	Porsche 911 GT3 Cup	V.I.P. Petfoods (Aust) P/L	100	85	130	32	126	125	121	-	719
8	John Teulan	54	Ferrari 360 Challenge	Prancing Horse Racing	51	11	104	68	88	45	36	65	468
9	Scott Shearman	77	Porsche 911 GT3 Cup	Scott Shearman	52	56	-	64	64	76	76	56	444
10	Sam Newman	17	Ferrari 360 Challenge	Prancing Horse Racing	53	48	84	69	44	68	42	31	439
11	Steve Beards	24	Ferrari 360 Challenge	Prancing Horse Racing	45	52	45	61	88	62	48	-	401
12	D'arcy Russell	7	Chrysler Viper ACR	D'Arcy Russell Racing	108	-	-	-	-	-	44	88	240
13	Maher Algadri	88	Porsche 911 GT3 Cup; Ferrari 360 Challenge	Maher Algadri	-	52	-	66	0	46	59	-	223
14	Ian Palmer	20	Honda NSX Brabham	Cockatoo Creek	26	31	-	45	20	39	-	36	197
15	Brian Carr	88	Ferrari 360 Challenge; Ford Mustang Cobra R	Prancing Horse Racing	-	72	-	30	58	30	-	-	190
16	Chris Seidler	11	Porsche 911	Liberty Financial	30	17	57	27	-	-	-	-	131
17	Dean Cook	9	Porsche 911	Liberty Financial	39	-	57	27	-	-	-	-	123
18	Rusty French	6	Chrysler Viper	Skye Sands	-	-	-	-	-	-	77	39	116
19	David Scaysbrook	28	Porsche 911	Fuzion	-	-	-	-	-	-	22	88	110
20	Dean Grant	10	Porsche 911	Liberty Financial	19	-	61	-	-	-	-	-	80
21	Rod Wilson	99	Ferrari 360 Challenge	Prancing Horse Racing	-	-	-	-	-	-	-	45	45
22	Paul Morris	88	Ferrari 360 Challenge	Prancing Horse Racing	-	-	-	-	-	-	-	28	28
23	Max Warwick	83	Porsche 911	Warwick Fabrics	-	-	-	-	-	-	17	-	17
24	Russell Wright	50	Porsche 911	Russell Wright	-	-	-	-	-	-	-	14	14
Group Two
1	John Teulan	54	Ferrari 360 Challenge	Prancing Horse Racing	160	40	181	170	175	150	156	160	1192
2	Sam Newman	17	Ferrari 360 Challenge	Prancing Horse Racing	156	105	155	165	100	176	165	95	1117
3	Steve Beards	24	Ferrari 360 Challenge	Prancing Horse Racing	155	105	86	161	171	165	175	-	1018
4	Brian Carr	88	Ferrari 360 Challenge; Ford Mustang Cobra R	Prancing Horse Racing	-	121	-	130	140	140	-	-	531
5	Chris Seidler	11	Porsche 911	Liberty Financial	130	45	121	125	-	-	-	-	421
6	David Scaysbrook	28	Porsche 911	Fuzion	-	-	-	-	-	-	135	181	316
7	Dean Cook	9	Porsche 911	Liberty Financial	142	-	155	-	-	-	-	-	297
8	Dean Grant	10	Porsche 911	Liberty Financial	116	-	125	-	-	-	-	-	241
9	Rod Wilson	99	Ferrari 360 Challenge	Prancing Horse Racing	-	-	-	-	-	-	-	150	150
10	Max Warwick	83	Porsche 911	Warwick Fabrics	-	-	-	-	-	-	120	-	120
11	Russell Wright	50	Porsche 911	Russell Wright	-	-	-	-	-	-	-	45	45
