= Jaycee Chan =

Chinese actor and singer (born 1982)

- 房祖名
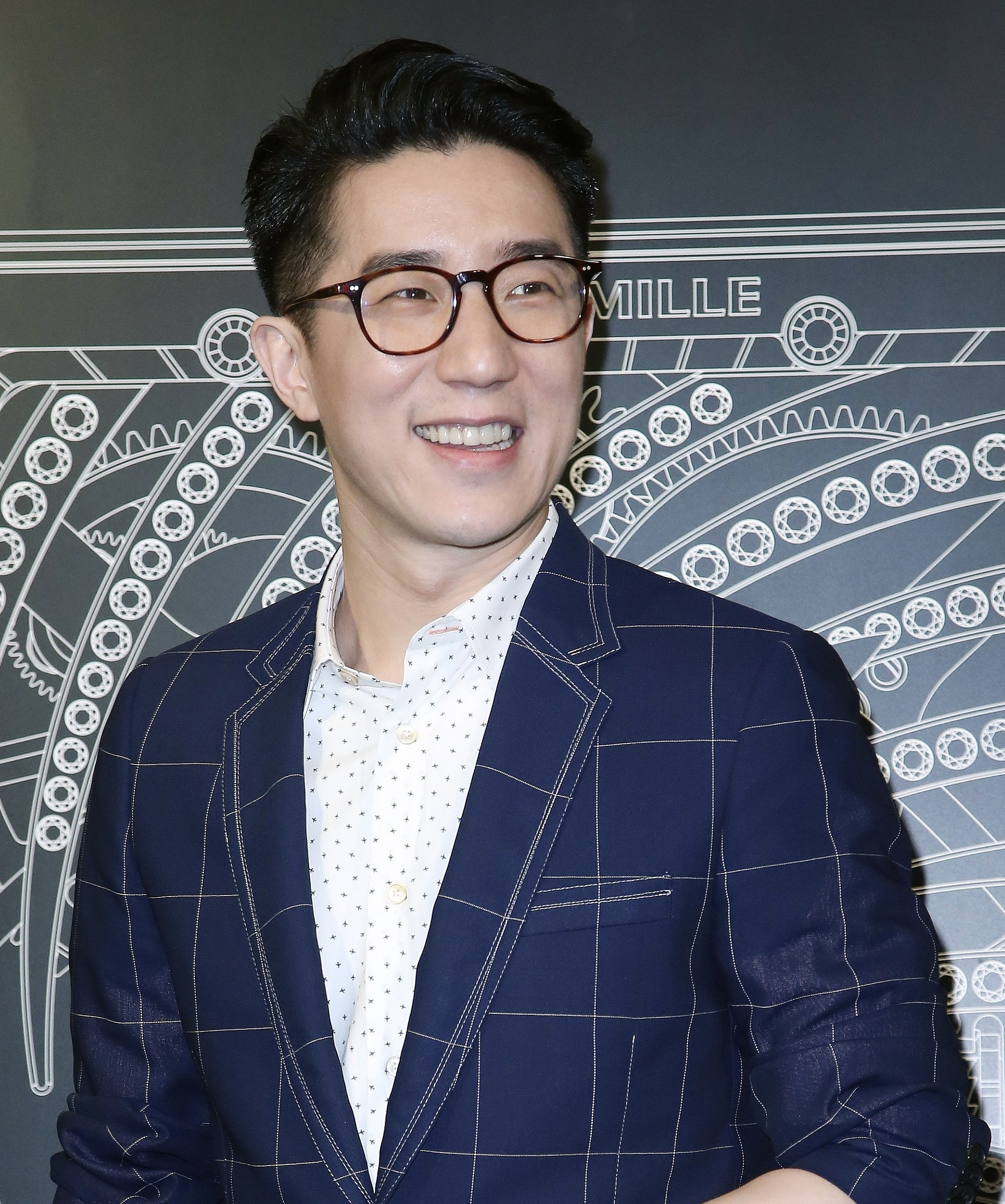
- Chan in 2024
- Born: Jaycee Chan Joming (陳祖明); December 3, 1982 (age 43); Los Angeles, California, United States
- Education: College of William & Mary
- Occupations: Actor; singer
- Years active: 2004–present
- Parents: Jackie Chan (father); Joan Lin (mother)
- Musical career
- Genres: Mandopop, Cantopop
- Instruments: Vocals, guitar
- Label: Emperor Entertainment Group

Chinese name
- Traditional Chinese: 陳祖明
- Simplified Chinese: 陈祖明
Transcriptions
Standard Mandarin
- Hanyu Pinyin: Chén Zǔmíng
Yue: Cantonese
- Jyutping: Chan4 Zo2 Ming4

Jaycee Chan Joming (Chinese: 房祖名, born December 3, 1982) is a Chinese actor and singer. The only son of Jackie Chan and Joan Lin, he debuted with a Mandopop album in 2004. While Chan was born an American citizen, in February 2009 he renounced his US citizenship for a Chinese citizenship in hopes to pursue a music and acting career in Greater China until his career was derailed by a 2014 arrest, along with Kai Ko, in Beijing for marijuana use. In 2021, he started his own Tequila brand Los 7 Ángeles.

== Early life and education ==
Jaycee Chan Joming was born on December 3, 1982, in Los Angeles, California, to Taiwanese actress Joan Lin and Hong Kong actor Jackie Chan.

Chan briefly attended the College of William and Mary in Williamsburg, Virginia, for two semesters, but dropped out. He has a penchant for luxury cars and nightlife and stated that he left school because "all you can see in Virginia is sheep."

Chan speaks English, Mandarin and Cantonese.

== Career ==
Giving up on school, Chan moved to Hong Kong in 2003 to pursue his career. He composed the music and wrote the lyrics for 10 of the 13 tracks on his first CD, "Jaycee" (2004). His film debut was The Twins Effect II, in which his father had a cameo role. His second role was a Hong Kong romance film 2 Young, in which he co-starred with Hong Kong Cantopop singer Fiona Sit. They both worked together again on Break Up Club in 2010. In 2007, he co-starred alongside Nicholas Tse and Shawn Yue in Benny Chan's action film Invisible Target.

Despite heavy promotions and awards, his albums and movies have not been commercially successful. His film Double Trouble only grossed US$9,000 in Hong Kong in the first two weeks.

In early 2009, Chinese websites reported he had given up his United States citizenship in favor of Chinese citizenship to appeal to local audiences. He later confirmed this on Instagram.

He voiced the younger version of his father's character Master Monkey in Secrets of the Furious Five. In addition, he voiced Master Crane in the Cantonese version of Kung Fu Panda and its sequel Kung Fu Panda 2.

Chan and his father starred together in Jackie's 100th film, 1911. The team-up resulted in Jackie Chan's least profitable and worst reviewed film to date.

In 2015, his father revealed that Chan had shown interest in writing a script for a sequel to CZ12 and will make the film "if it's right".

In 2024, Chan released his first single “In Search for Darkness” after 10 years of being in hiatus.

== Arrest ==
On August 18, 2014, it was reported that Chan had been arrested on August 14, by Beijing police due to drug possession, alongside Kai Ko, a Taiwanese actor. Public informants known as Chaoyang masses were credited for turning Chan in. Police later found more than 100 grams (3.5 oz) of marijuana after searching Chan's apartment. While Ko was set to be released 14 days after his arrest, Chan faced criminal charges and sentences up to the death penalty or life imprisonment for allegedly hosting others to consume marijuana.

Chan, whose father Jackie had been China's anti-drug goodwill ambassador since 2009, admitted to taking drugs for 8 years. Soon after, Jackie Chan made a public apology for his son's drug use. On September 17, 2014, Beijing Dongcheng procurator's office approved the formal arrest of Chan on suspicion of "accommodating drug users".

Chan spent his 32nd birthday in custody with his mother stating that her son has borrowed more than a hundred books to read since he was detained. On December 22, 2014, four months after his arrest, Chan was indicted by Chinese authorities for sheltering other people to use drugs. His trial finally began on January 9, 2015, in Beijing, after spending 148 days in detention. Chan was sentenced to six months in prison and fined 2,000 yuan (~US$320). Chan confessed that he broke the law and he should be punished for his actions and that he would not do it again. His parents did not attend their son's hearing, although the elder Chan was reportedly in Beijing. His father repeatedly said that he would not use his connections to lighten his son's sentence.

It was later revealed that during his detention, Chan wrote a three-page remorse letter to his mother in which he promised that he would not repeat his mistakes in the future.

Chan was released from jail on February 13. One day after his release, Chan held a press conference in Beijing to make a public apology by saying that he had no reason and no excuse for his law breaking and his arrest had a negative impact on society and that it disappointed his supporters while causing losses for those who worked with him. In his four-minute speech, he promised that he would be a law-abiding citizen, and while he still had plans to continue in the entertainment industry, he would focus on spending Chinese New Year with his parents. He stated that prison life was harsh and that his father did not use any connections to help ease his sentence. He extended a deep bow both before and after his speech.

Before his arrest in August 2014, Chan was filming Monk Comes Down the Mountain. His role in the film was not credited due to his arrest.

== Reception and public image ==
Chan is largely viewed as a spendthrift and "playboy" whose movies and music have not been met with commercial or critical success despite heavy promotion and support. In 2014, People's Daily ranked Chan as one of China's top "wastrel" fuerdai. Chan's arrest in 2014 severely affected his career, and he lost multi-million dollar endorsements and contracts from Adidas, Nivea, Yishion, Johnson & Johnson contact lenses, Stride gum, KFC, and Chevrolet.

== Personal life ==
After Chan's release from prison, he lived with his mother in Taipei, keeping a low profile, and often wearing a mask to avoid being recognised in public.

He claimed he had flown before COVID-19 had spread to the United States. When the situation worsened in the US, he decided to stay in LA as he felt that he would have a higher probability of being infected if he were to make the long journey home.

=== Relationship with Jackie Chan ===
During an awards ceremony in Beijing in April 2011, Jackie stated that he would be donating half his money to charity when he dies, instead of to his son. Jackie explained, "If he is capable, he can make his own money. If he is not, then he will just be wasting my money."

After serving six months in jail, Chan met his father for the first time in Taiwan, and the two appeared to have reconciled. "I hadn't seen him for too long. I feel he's matured this time," Jackie Chan said. "We didn't talk about unhappy things. It was all family chat. We talked into the night and didn't sleep." Before leaving to do a promotion, he gave his son a haircut.

== Filmography ==
Year	Title	Chinese Title	Role	Notes/Ref.
2004	The Twins Effect II	千機變II: 花都大戰	Charcoal Head / Star of Rex	
2005	2 Young	早熟 爾冬升	Fong Ka-fu	
2006	McDull, the Alumni	春田花花同學會	Office staff member	Cameo
2006	The Heavenly Kings	四大天王	Himself	
2007	The Sun Also Rises	太陽照常升起 姜文	The Son	
2007	Invisible Target	男兒本色	Officer Wai King-ho	
2007	The Drummer	戰鼓	Sid	
2007	PK.COM.CN	誰說青春不能錯	Zhang Wenli	
2008	Kung Fu Panda	功夫熊猫	Crane (voice)	Cantonese dub
2008	Secrets of the Furious Five	虎膽五俠	Young Monkey (voice)	
2009	Tracing Shadow	追影	Lord Xu	
2009	Mulan	花木蘭	Fei Xiaohu a.k.a. "Tiger"	
2010	Break Up Club	分手說愛你	Joe	
2011	1911	辛亥革命	Zhang Zhenwu	
2011	Kung Fu Panda 2	功夫熊猫2	Crane	Cantonese dub
2011	Lee's Adventure	李獻計歷險記	Li Xianji	
2011	East Meets West	東成西就		
2012	Her Father His Father	春暖花開		
2012	Double Trouble	寶島雙雄	Jay	
2012	Whoever	愛誰誰		
2012	Chrysanthemum to the Beast	給野獸獻花		
2013	Machi Action	變身		Cameo
2013	The Ideal City	一座城池		
2013	Love Speaks	意外的戀愛時光	Zhou Tong	
2015	Monk Comes Down the Mountain	道士下山	Peng Qizi	Uncredited
2016	Railroad Tigers	铁道飞虎	Rui Ge	
2021	Good Night Beijing	北京·晚九朝五		Also director
TBA	Great Mr. Zhou	了不起的周先生		

== Discography ==
Released	Title	Language	Track listing
2004	Jaycee (Self-titled audio Video CD)	Mandarin	Track listing: 1. "Computer Data"; 2. "邊走邊唱" "Walking and Singing" (MV); 3. "最動聽" "The Most Touching Song" (MV); 4. "Jaycee"; 5. "邊走邊唱" "Walking and Singing"; 6. "最動聽" "The Most Touching Song"; 7. "人" "Human"; 8. "一年八個月" "8 Months in One Year"; 9. "答應" "Agree"; 10. "我還愛吸毒" "I Still Love You"; 11. "人工牆" "Man-made Wall"; 12. "要強" "Be Strong"; 13. ""Hold On" JC said" 14. "JC's Berp"; 15. "Saturday Night"; 16. "Little Boy"; 17. "Angel"; 18. "Jaycee Intro"; 19. "Am I Weird?"; 20. 要強 (Demo) "Be Strong" (Demo); 21. "Saturday Night with Mom"; 22. 我還愛吸毒 (Demo 1) "I Still Love You" (Demo 1); 23. 我還愛吸毒 (Demo 2) "I Still Love You" (Demo 2)
2010	亂 Chaos	Mandarin	Track listing: 1. WEIRD ME; 2. 若無其事 (緯來韓劇"天使的誘惑 "片尾曲) Like it's nothing 3. 迷 Lost; 4. 忠 Loyal; 5. 累 Tired; 6. 假動作 (八大韓劇"妻子的誘惑"片頭曲) Fake actions 7. Nice to Meet You; 8. 我的肝 My liver 9. 最好的我（合唱:龔芝怡） Best of me 10. 兩個人 Two people 11. 知己 Soulmates; 12. 一路好走 (中版) Safe journey (Mandarin version); 13. 別放棄 Don't give up 14. 下次再見 Next time we meet 15. 不知不覺 Unknowingly; 16. 光明行 Bright way 17. 一路好走(鋼琴版) Safe journey (piano version); 18. 一路好走
