= Jian Xia Qing Yuan =

Chinese wuxia video game franchise by Seasun and Kingsoft

- Genres: Action role-playing, MMORPG
- Developer: Seasun Games
- Publisher: Kingsoft
- Creators: Qiu Xin; Li Lanyun; Luo Xiaoyin
- Composer: Luo Xiaoyin
- Platforms: DOS, Windows, Android, iOS
- First release: Jian Xia Qing Yuan; April 1997
- Latest release: JX3 Ultimate; 13 June 2024
- Spin-offs: World of Sword series

Jian Xia Qing Yuan (simplified Chinese: 剑侠情缘; traditional Chinese: 劍俠情緣; pinyin: Jiànxiá Qíngyuán), abbreviated in English as the JX series (Chinese: 剑侠情缘系列), is a wuxia video game franchise created by the Chinese developer Seasun Games (西山居), the game studio of the software company Kingsoft. The first instalment was released for DOS in April 1997 and is generally credited as the first commercially published wuxia role-playing video game produced in mainland China, a title that established the studio's best-known intellectual property.

After four single-player titles released between 1997 and 2001, the franchise moved almost entirely to online distribution, first with subscription-based massively multiplayer online role-playing games (MMORPGs) and later with mobile and cross-platform releases. The 2009 MMORPG JX Online 3 (剑侠情缘网络版叁), usually shortened to JX3, has become Kingsoft's main revenue source of its interactive entertainment business.

== Setting and common elements ==
The series is set in a fictionalised jianghu embedded in Chinese Wuxia fictions, and its recurring themes are the tension between martial artists, personal loyalties (harem) and rival organizations, from which the title (literally "sword hero, love and destiny") is derived. The single-player games and the earliest online titles take place during the wars between the Southern Song and the Jin, and combine invented martial-arts sects with historical figures such as Yue Fei, Han Shizhong and Qin Hui. JX Online 3 instead moved the setting to the Tang dynasty on the eve of the An Lushan rebellion, with playable schools such as the Pure Yang Palace, Shaolin and the Tang Clan, and it incorporates elements of traditional Chinese culture including classical poetry, music, silk, tea and the guqin. Character progression across the series is organised around martial-arts schools whose skills counter one another, a structure that was carried over from the single-player games into the online entries.

== Games ==
=== Single-player games (1997–2001) ===
Jian Xia Qing Yuan was released in April 1997 for DOS after roughly a year of development by a seven-person team, priced at 128 yuan; against an internal expectation of 10,000 units, it sold about 25,000 copies, and Kingsoft chairman Qiu Bojun later said that sales could have exceeded 30,000 had the game not gone out of stock. The sequel Jian Xia Qing Yuan 2 followed in June 2000 after about two years of development; it abandoned turn-based combat for a real-time action system inspired by Diablo, and sold more than 200,000 copies, a record for a domestically developed role-playing game in China at the time.

A side story, Jian Xia Qing Yuan Waizhuan: Moon Shadow Legend (月影传说), appeared in July 2001 with a new protagonist, multiple endings and a strong emphasis on soundtrack, selling roughly 150,000 copies. In December 2001 Seasun released New Jian Xia Qing Yuan (新剑侠情缘), a remake of the original game on a newer engine with real-time combat and additional mini-games; it proved to be the last mainline single-player entry in the franchise, and by that point the series was estimated, including unauthorised copies, to have reached around seven million players.

=== Online games (2003–present) ===
Work on a single-player Jian Xia Qing Yuan 3 began in 2001 but was cancelled in 2002, when the studio redirected its entire team to online development in response to the rapid growth of the Chinese MMORPG market. A retro-styled international version, Jian Xia Qing Yuan R, was later brought to Southeast Asian territories such as Singapore and Malaysia, where the original game had been popular in the 2000s.

Technically, JX Online 3 was among the first group of titles announced as supporting Nvidia's RTX ray tracing.

=== Mobile games and spin-offs ===
Kingsoft has continued to treat the franchise as its core wuxia portfolio, announcing a further mobile title, Fate of Sword: Zero, in its 2024 annual results.

== Development ==
The first Jian Xia Qing Yuan grew out of an unfinished independent project called Dugu Jiu Jian; its author Qiu Xin joined Seasun in 1996 and, together with the composer Luo Xiaoyin and the designer Li Lanyun, formed the trio later nicknamed the studio's "three swordsmen". Li Lanyun was responsible for the setting, narrative structure and system design of the first game, rebuilding much of the original concept before release. Music has been a consistent selling point of the franchise: the theme song of Jian Xia Qing Yuan 2, written by Li Lanyun and composed by Luo Xiaoyin, was subsequently reused as a theme for a televised wuxia adaptation.

== Reception and commercial performance ==
The original game received the "best domestic RPG" and "best music" awards from the magazine Popular Software and was voted the most popular computer disc by readers of Multimedia World; in the same period Qiu Bojun grouped it with Xuan-Yuan Sword and Chinese Paladin as the "three swords" of Chinese-language role-playing games, a label that has persisted. Commentators have nevertheless noted that the abandonment of single-player development after 2001 left the brand associated almost exclusively with online services.

Kingsoft reported that revenue from its online games and other businesses rose 78 per cent year on year to 1,708.0 million yuan in the third quarter of 2024, attributing the increase mainly to JX3 Online and the launch of JX3 Ultimate, which reached 11.46 million monthly active users in its first month of open beta. For the full year 2024 the segment grew 31 per cent to 5,196.8 million yuan, which the company again credited primarily to JX3 Online. In its results for the fourth quarter of 2025 Kingsoft continued to describe JX3 Online as its flagship personal-computer game, while the older client games and derived mobile titles such as World of Sword: Origin were said to be operating stably in domestic and overseas markets.

== Other media ==
The franchise has been adapted into live-action television. The 33-episode series Jianxia Qingyuan: Cangjian Shanzhuang (剑侠情缘之藏剑山庄) was jointly produced by Hairun Film & TV and Kingsoft. China Network Television described it as an adaptation of JX Online 3, and it was broadcast on CCTV-8 in 2012.

The franchise has been adapted into the animated comedy series JX Online 3: The Adventure of Shen Jianxin (剑网3·侠肝义胆沈剑心), produced in-house by Seasun's animation unit rather than an outside studio, whose first twelve-episode season premiered on 21 September 2018. The series follows Shen Jianxin, an ordinary village guard who accidentally masters the secret manuals of the Pure Yang Palace and is drawn into the martial world of the high Tang. A second season premiered on 27 December 2019, a third on 8 July 2022, and a fourth on 8 November 2025.

Beyond entertainment media, the franchise has been used as a vehicle for heritage promotion: JX3 Online has run collaborations with intangible cultural heritage holders and, in 2024, a joint project with the Dunhuang museum authorities aimed at digitally restoring historical cave sites, which received coverage from state media.

== See also ==
- Video gaming in China
- Wuxia
