= Ferrari 360 =

Italian two-seater sports car

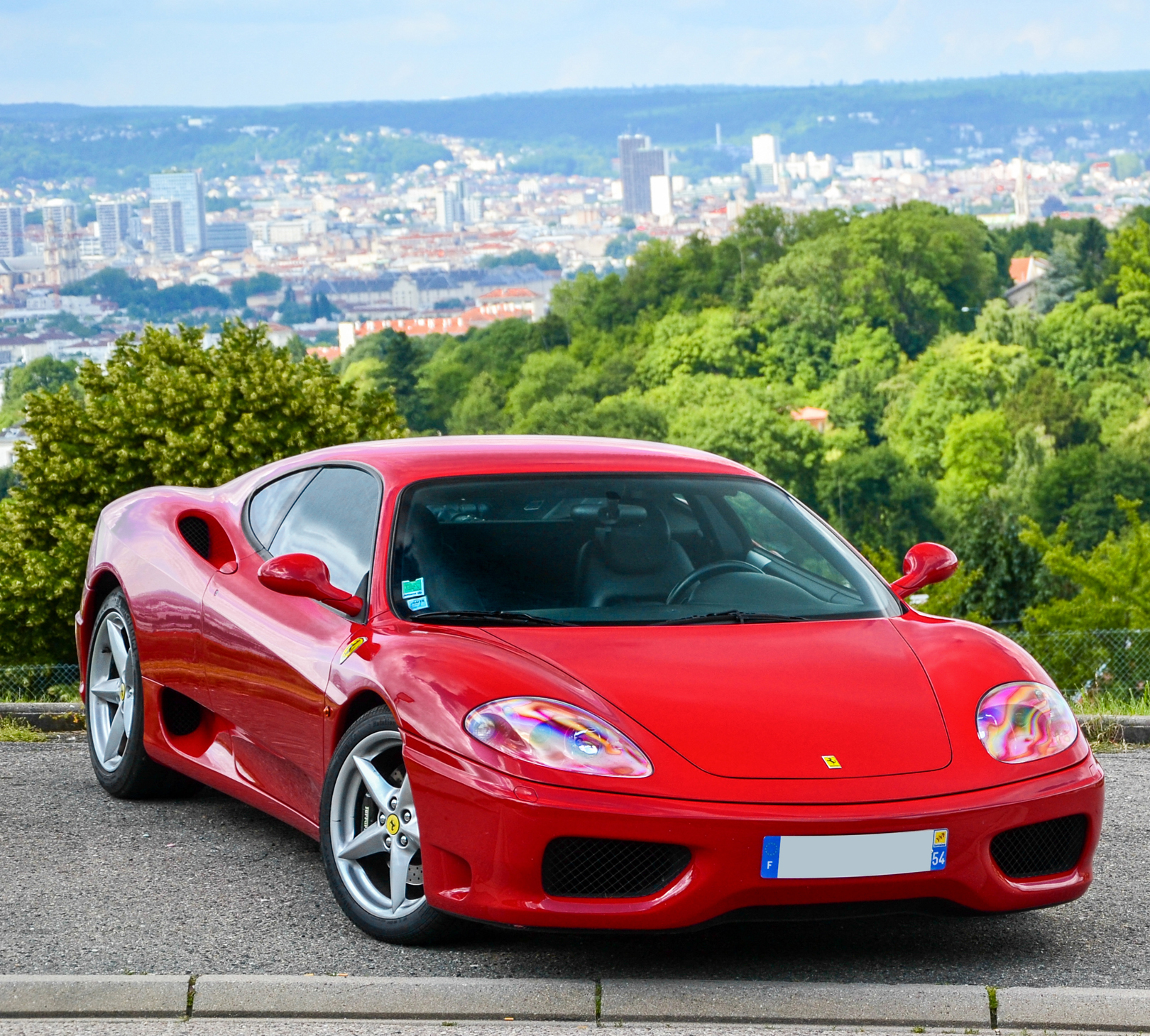

Overview
- Manufacturer: Ferrari
- Production: 1999–2004
- Model years: 2000–2005
- Assembly: Italy: Maranello
- Designer: Goran Popović at Pininfarina

Body and chassis
- Class: Sports car (S)
- Body style: 2-door berlinetta 2-door spider
- Layout: Longitudinal, Rear mid-engine, rear-wheel drive

Powertrain
- Engine: 3.6 L (3,586 cc) Tipo F131 V8
- Transmission: 6-speed manual 6-speed 'F1' Graziano automated manual

Dimensions
- Wheelbase: 2,600 mm (102.4 in)
- Length: 4,477 mm (176.3 in)
- Width: 1,922 mm (75.7 in)
- Height: 1,214 mm (47.8 in)
- Curb weight: 1,493 kg (3,291 lb) (Modena) 1,553 kg (3,424 lb) (Spider) 1,430 kg (3,152 lb) (Challenge Stradale)

Chronology
- Predecessor: Ferrari F355
- Successor: Ferrari F430

The Ferrari 360 (Type F131) is a two-seater sports car which was manufactured by Ferrari from 1999 until 2004. It has a rear mid-engine, rear-wheel-drive layout with coupé and roadster body styles. The 360 has a 3,586 cc (218.8 cu in) V8 engine which is mounted longitudinally. It succeeded the Ferrari F355 and was replaced by the Ferrari F430 in 2004.

== Development history ==
Ferrari partnered with Alcoa to produce an entirely new all-aluminum space-frame chassis that was 40 percent stiffer than its predecessors which had utilized steel. The design was 28 percent lighter despite a ten percent increase in overall dimensions. Along with a lightweight frame the new Pininfarina body styling deviated from traditions of the previous decade's sharp angles and flip-up headlights. The V8 engine has a 3.6-litre capacity, a flat-plane crankshaft, and titanium connecting rods. The engine generates a power output of 400 PS (294 kW; 395 hp). According to Ferrari, weight was reduced by 60 kg (132 lb) and the 0–100 km/h (62 mph) acceleration time improved from 4.7 to 4.5 seconds.

The first model to be produced was the 360 Modena, followed later by the 360 Spider and a special edition, the Challenge Stradale. The Challenge Stradale was the high-performance road-legal version of the 360 produced by the factory, featuring carbon ceramic brakes (from the Enzo), track-tuned suspension, aerodynamic gains, weight reduction, power improvements and revised gearbox software among its track-focused brief. There were 8,800 Modenas, 7,565 Spiders and 1,288 Challenge Stradale produced worldwide. There were 4,199 built for the US market—1,810 Modenas (coupes) and 2,389 Spiders (convertibles). Of those numbers, there were only 469 Modenas and 670 Spiders that were produced with a gated 6-speed manual transmission as opposed to the "F1" single-clutch automated manual transmission.

In addition to this were the low-volume factory race cars and a one-off Barchetta variant. The race cars were all derived from the 360 Modena and for the first time produced as a separate model in their own right (compared to being a retrofit kit in previous years). While the Barchetta was based on the Spider variant. The first race car was the 360 Modena Challenge, used in a one-make series; the factory-built racing cars were prepared by the official tuner, Michelotto, who also developed the 360 N-GT. The N-GT was a 360 Challenge car evolved even further to compete in the FIA N-GT racing class alongside other marques such as Porsche.

== Design ==
The 360 Modena represented a stylistic break with the angular, retractable‑headlamp aesthetic of Ferrari's previous mid‑engined V‑8 berlinettas. In 1995–97, Ferrari instructed its long‑time collaborator Pininfarina to develop a "clean‑sheet" shape to suit an all‑new aluminium space‑frame chassis and to mark the dawn of a new millennium. Designed by Serbian designer Goran Popovic under the direction of Lorenzo Ramaciotti, head of Pininfarina's design studio, the team produced a curvaceous, aerodynamically efficient body with a long wheelbase and wide tracks. The resulting design is devoid of a traditional "egg‑crate" grille; instead two separate intakes at each corner feed radiators positioned low in the nose and allow the centre section to channel airflow under the flat underbody. Twin rear diffusers generate ground effect and obviate the need for a rear spoiler.

Concept and Styling Process

Ferrari's brief called for a body that integrated seamlessly with the new aluminium chassis and improved downforce without adding drag. Ramaciotti's team at Pininfarina began by exploring a number of full‑size clay models during 1996–97; the chosen proposal combined a sweeping beltline with large side intakes and transparent headlamp covers. Giuseppe Randazzo, head of Pininfarina's styling technical office, recalled that the 360 was the first Ferrari to be fully developed using computer‑aided surfacing; his department used Alias digital tools to refine the surfaces before milling the clays and then returned to CAD for final adjustments. The exterior was signed off in late 1997 and the design was frozen for production the following year.

The exterior theme was the work of Pininfarina under the design director Lorenzo Ramaciotti; he later filed a US design patent for the 360's external form. The patent drawings show a smooth nose with flush‑mounted headlamp covers, an unbroken side profile with recessed door handles, prominent rear‑fender air intakes and a crisp tail with twin round tail lamps.

Styling Features

The 360's nose is characterised by two wide radiator openings flanking a raised central section; the shape allows air to pass underneath the car to a flat floor, ending in a pair of diffusers that increase downforce at speed. The transparent headlamp covers were a production first for a Ferrari V8 berlinetta and eliminated the drag and weight penalties of pop‑up units. In profile, the car's cab‑forward stance emphasises the mid‑mounted V‑8 engine; a curved glass engine cover displays the intake plenums and red crackle‑finish cam covers. Large, elliptical scoops carved into the rear wings feed the side radiators and recall the buttresses of the 250 LM and Dino 206 GT, while the tail remains faithful to Ferrari tradition with twin circular tail lamps on each side.

The interior, meanwhile, was developed jointly by Pininfarina and Ferrari's Centro Stile and features a driver‑centric dashboard with exposed aluminium, leather trim and body‑coloured panels.

=== Design Patent ===
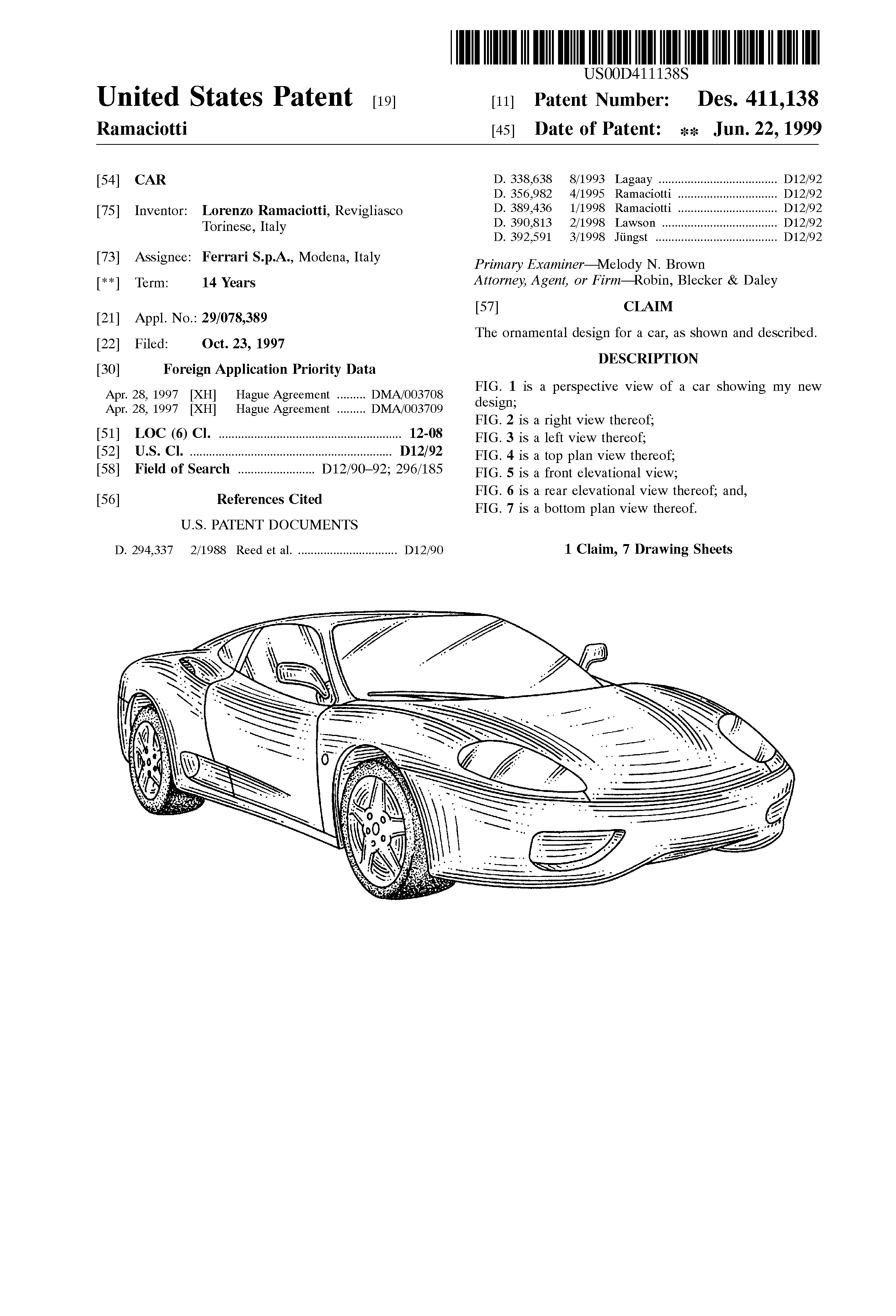
Official US design patent drawing of the Ferrari 360 Modena – perspective view (Fig. 1) from US Design Patent D411,138, filed 23 Oct 1997 and granted 22 Jun 1999. Inventor: Lorenzo Ramaciotti; assignee: Ferrari S.p.A.

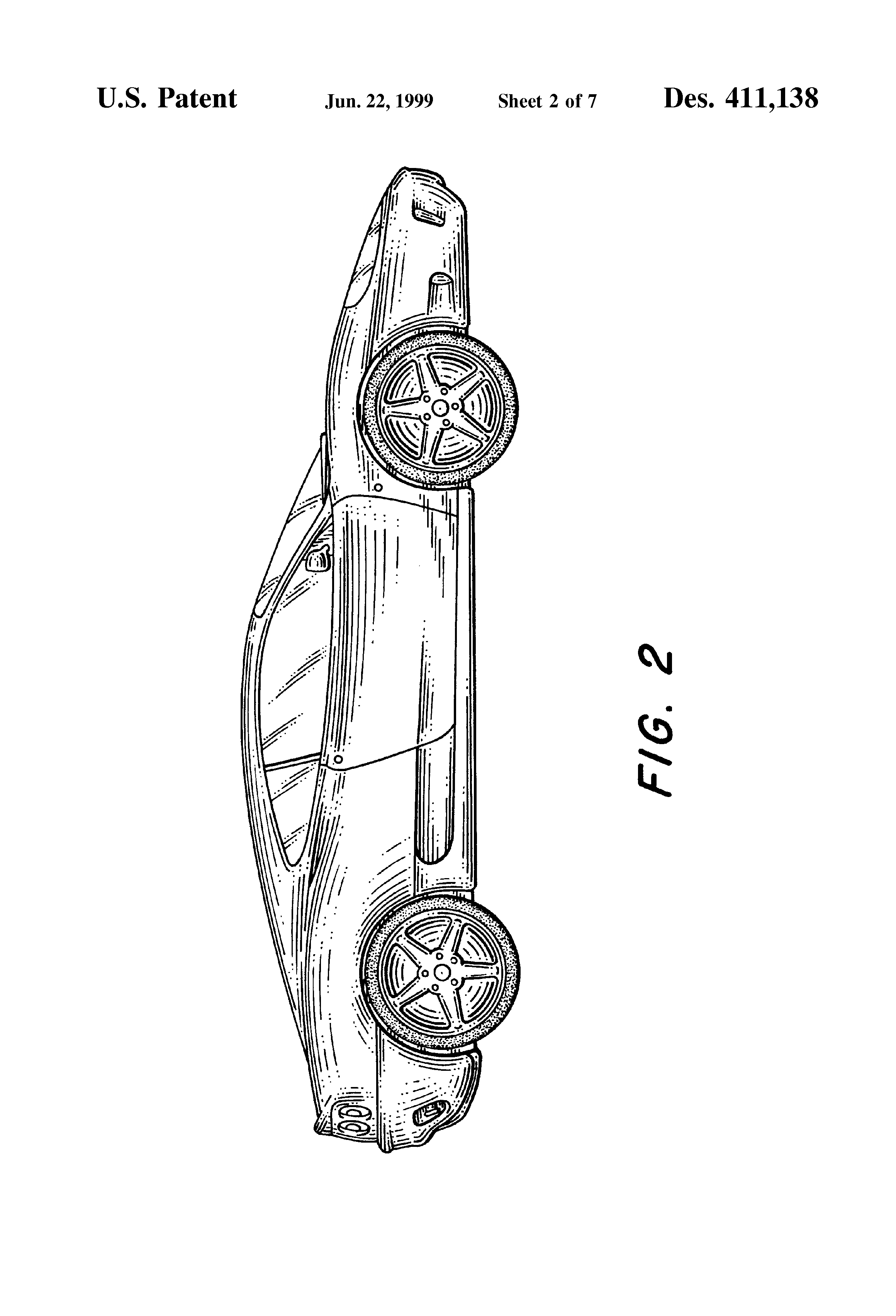
Official US design patent drawing of the Ferrari 360 Modena – side‑elevation (Fig. 2) from US Design Patent D411,138, filed 23 Oct 1997 and granted 22 Jun 1999. Inventor: Lorenzo Ramaciotti; assignee: Ferrari S.p.A.

== Road models ==
=== Modena ===
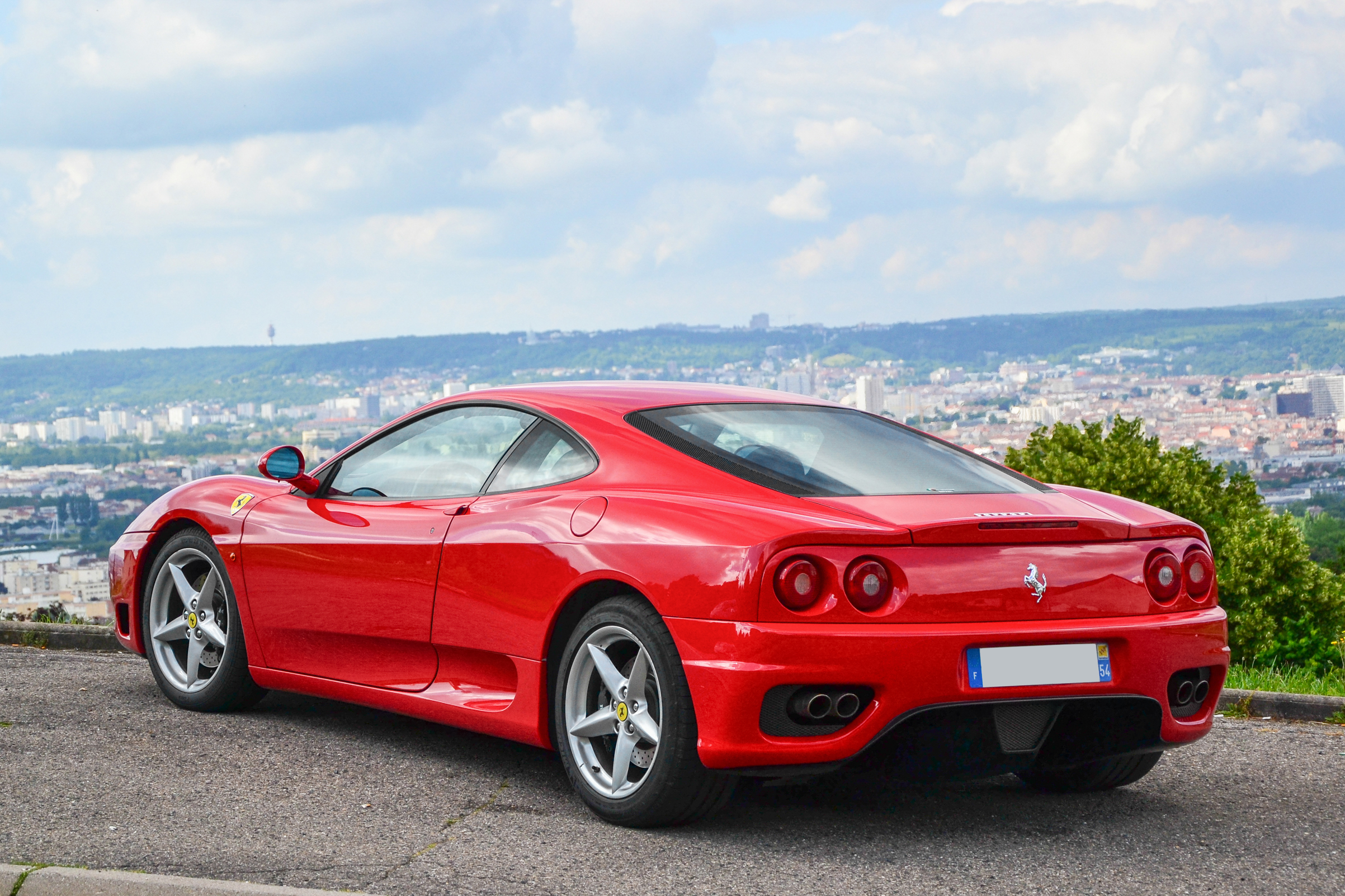
360 Modena

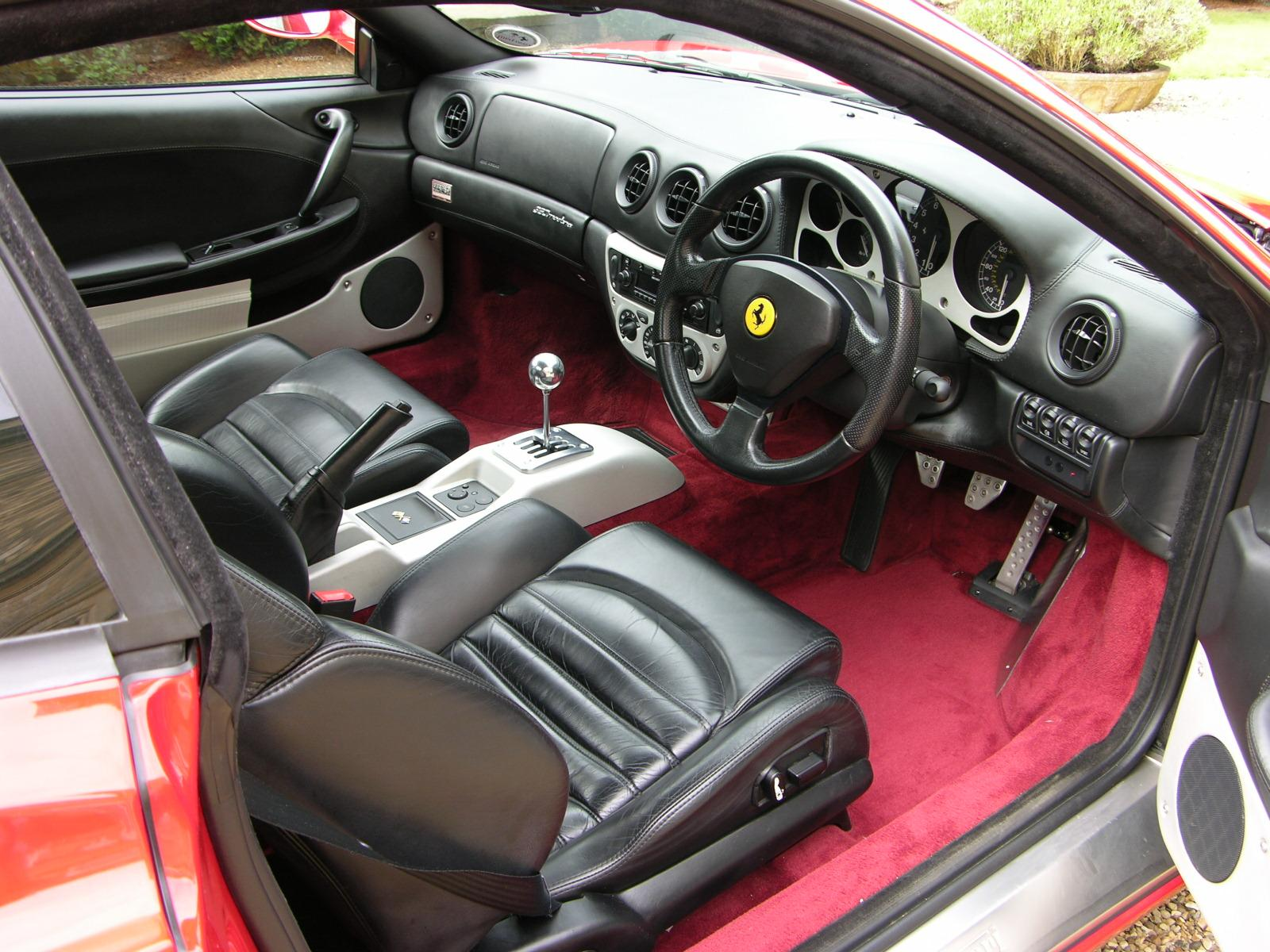
Interior. This 360 has the 6-speed gated manual transmission

The first model of the 360 to be produced was the Modena, named after the town of Modena, the birthplace of Enzo Ferrari. Transmission options were a 6-speed manual transmission, or the electrohydraulic-actuated "F1" automated manual transmission with a gearbox built by Graziano Trasmissioni.

The 360 Modena went into production in 1999 and remained in production until 2005 when it was replaced by the F430. The Modena was followed two years later by the 360 Spider, Ferrari's 20th road-going convertible which at launch overtook sales of the Modena. Other than weight, the Spider's specifications matched those of the Modena almost exactly.

=== Spider ===
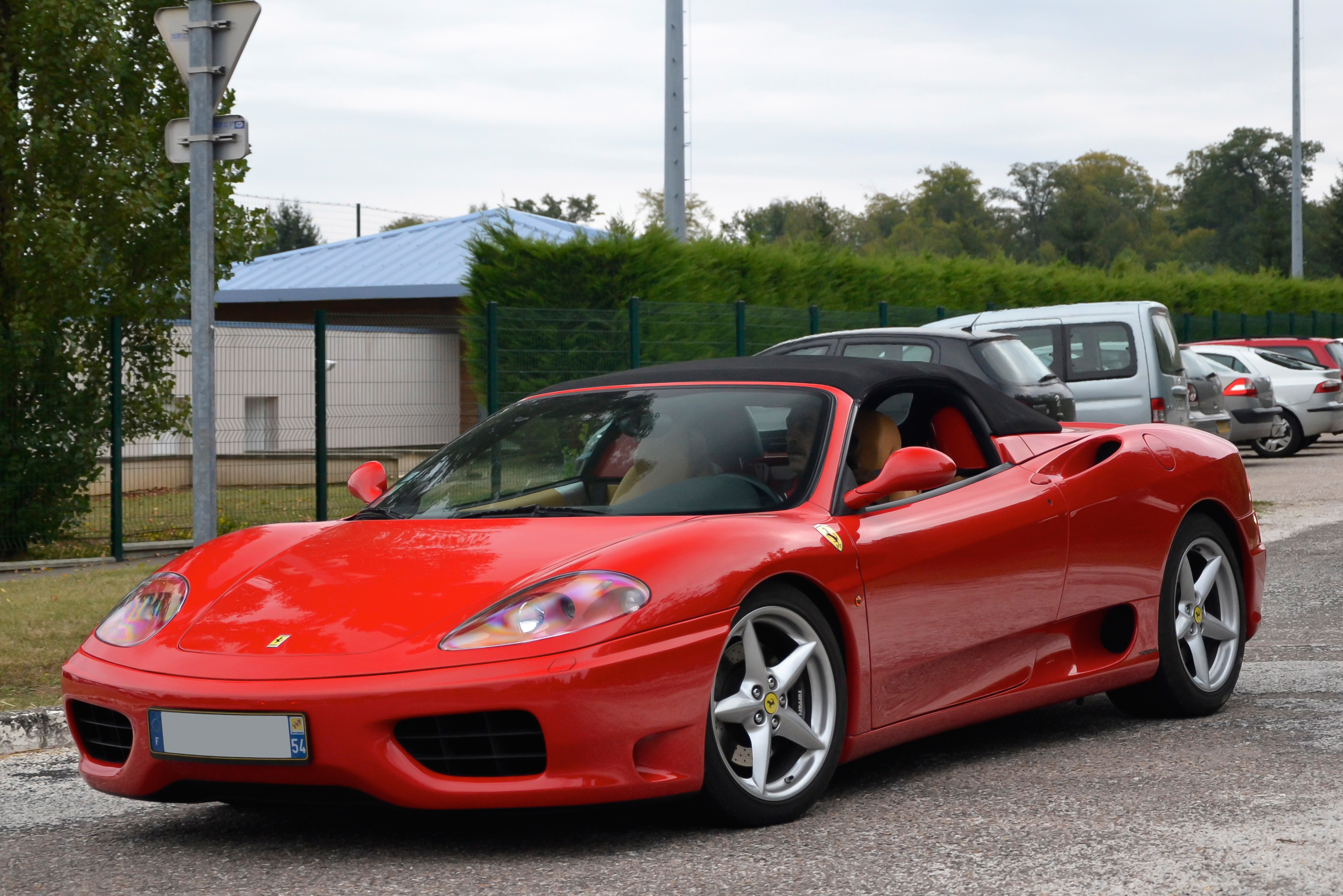

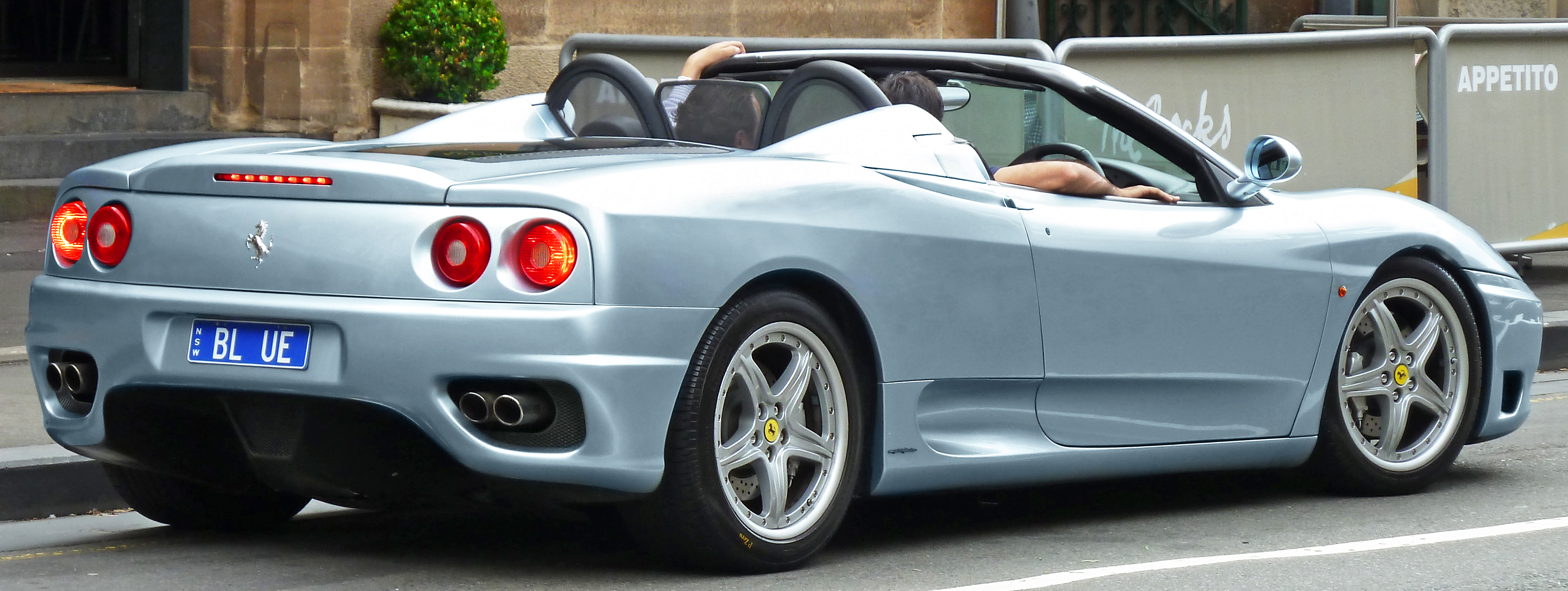
Ferrari 360 Spider

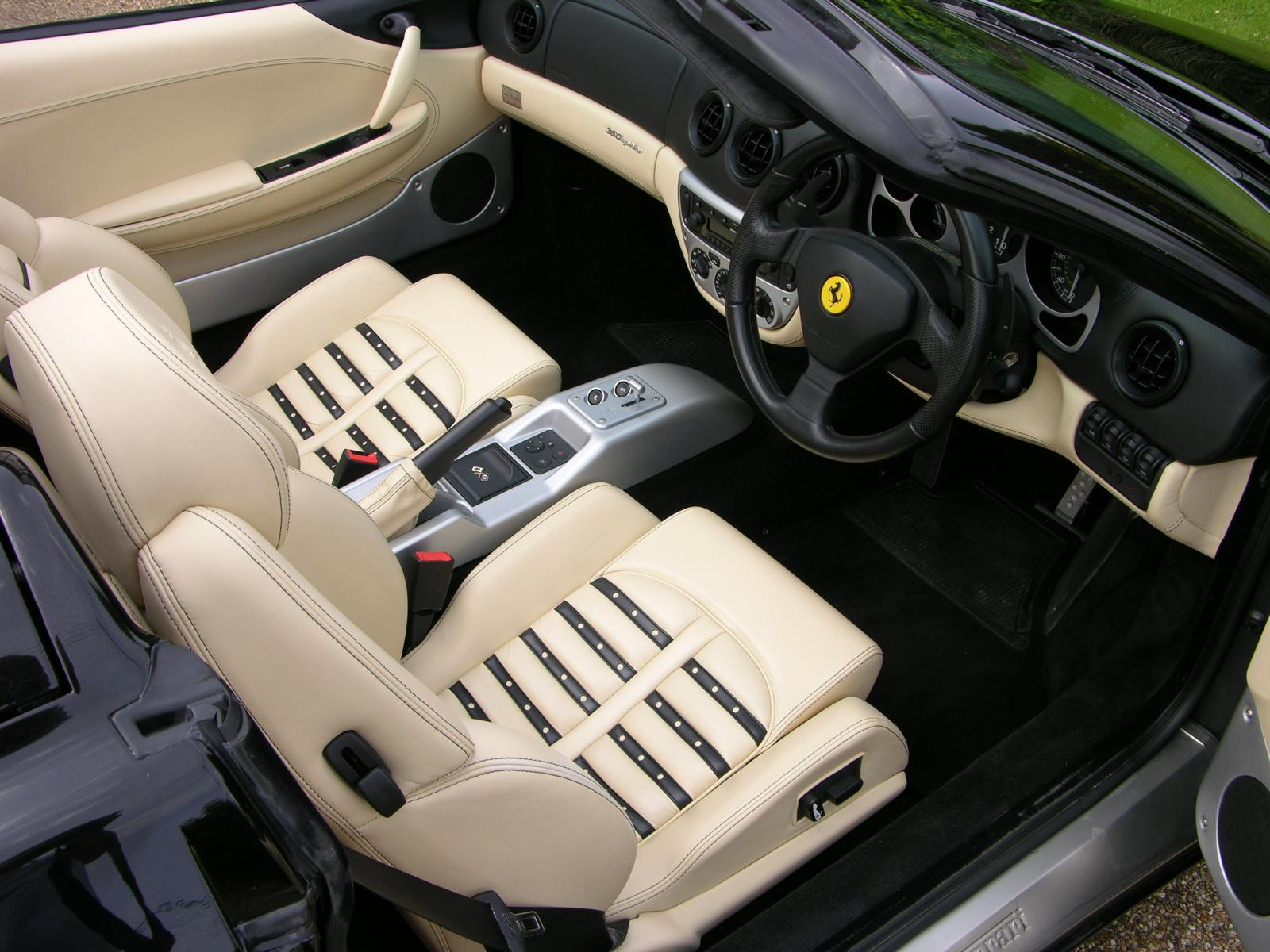
Interior with F1 paddleshift gearbox

The Ferrari 360 Spider was unveiled at the 2000 Geneva Motor Show.

The 360 was designed with a convertible variant in mind; since removing the roof of a coupe reduces the torsional rigidity, the 360 was built for strength in other areas. Ferrari designers strengthened the sills, stiffened the front of the floorpan and redesigned the windscreen frame. The rear bulkhead had to be stiffened to cut out engine noise from the cabin. The convertible's necessary dynamic rigidity is provided by additional side reinforcements and a cross brace in front of the engine. Passenger safety is ensured by a strengthened windscreen frame and roll bars.

The 360 Spider displays a curvilinear waistline. The fairings imply the start of a roof, and stable roll bars are embedded in these elevations. Due to use of light aluminium construction throughout, the Spider weighs in only 60 kg (130 lb) heavier than the coupé.

As with the Modena version, its 3.6 L (3,586 cc) V8 generating a power output of 400 PS (294 kW; 395 hp) is on display under a glass engine cover. The engine — confined in space by the convertible's top's storage area — acquires additional air supply through especially large side air intakes. The intake manifolds were moved towards the centre of the engine between the air supply conduits in the Spider's engine compartment, as opposed to lying apart as with the Modena. In terms of performance, the 0–60 mph (97 km/h) acceleration time was slightly slower due to the slight weight increase, and the top speed was reduced to 290 km/h (180 mph) due to higher drag.

Despite the car's mid-mounted V8 engine, the electrically operated top is able to stow into the compartment when not in use. The convertible top was available in black, blue, grey and beige colours.

==== Dimensions ====
- Overall: length 4,477 mm (176.3 in)
- Overall: width 1,922 mm (75.7 in)
- Height: 1,235 mm (48.6 in)
- Wheelbase: 2,600 mm (102.4 in)
- Front track: 1,669 mm (65.7 in)
- Rear track: 1,617 mm (63.7 in)
- Weight: 1,350 kg (2,976 lb)
- Curb weight: 1,553 kg (3,424 lb)
- Weight distribution: 42/58% front/rear
- Fuel capacity: 95 L (25 US gal; 21 imp gal)

=== Specifications (Modena and Spider) ===
==== Engine ====
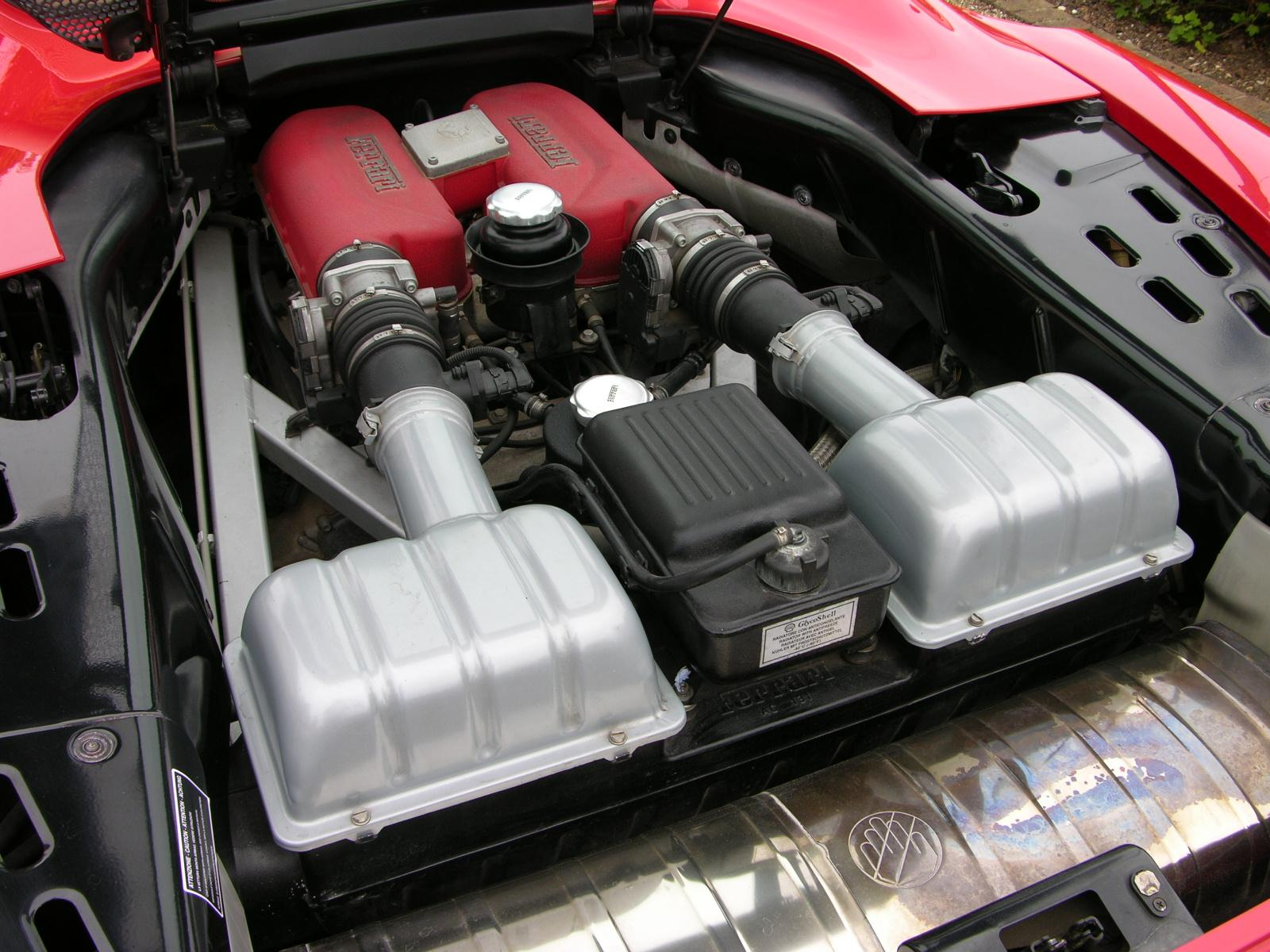
The Tipo F131 V8 engine

- Type: 90° V8 F1310-00
- Bore & stroke: 85 mm × 79 mm (3.35 in × 3.11 in)
- Total displacement: 3,586 cc (3.6 L; 218.8 cu in)
- Redline: 8,500 rpm
- Maximum power: 400 PS (294 kW; 395 hp) at 8,500 rpm
- Maximum torque: 373 N⋅m (275 lb⋅ft) at 4,750 rpm

==== Performance ====
- Top speed: Redline limited - 282 km/h (175 mph) / Manufacturer claim - 295 km/h (183 mph) 295 km/h (183 mph) (Spider)
- Lift-to-drag ratio: -0.73:1
- Acceleration:
  - 0-50 km/h (31 mph): 2.47 seconds
  - 0-97 km/h (60 mph): 4.6 seconds
  - 0-100 km/h (62 mph): 4.98 seconds
  - 0-120 km/h (75 mph): 6.79 seconds
  - 0-161 km/h (100 mph): 11.1 seconds / 11.7 seconds
  - 0-209 km/h (130 mph): 21.9 seconds
  - Standing 1/4 mile (402 m): 13.1–13.2 seconds at 171–177 km/h (106–110 mph)
  - Standing kilometer: 23.74 seconds
- Braking: 113 km/h (70 mph)-0 mph: 165–175 ft (50–53 m)
- Lateral acceleration: 0.90 g
- Speed through 600 ft (180 m) slalom: 111 km/h (69.0 mph)
- EPA fuel economy:
  - City: 10 mpg_{‑US} (24 L/100 km; 12 mpg_{‑imp})
  - High way: 15 mpg_{‑US} (16 L/100 km; 18 mpg_{‑imp})
  - Combined: 11 mpg_{‑US} (21 L/100 km; 13 mpg_{‑imp})
- Est. range:
  - City: 250 mi (402 km)
  - Highway: 375 mi (604 km)

=== Barchetta ===
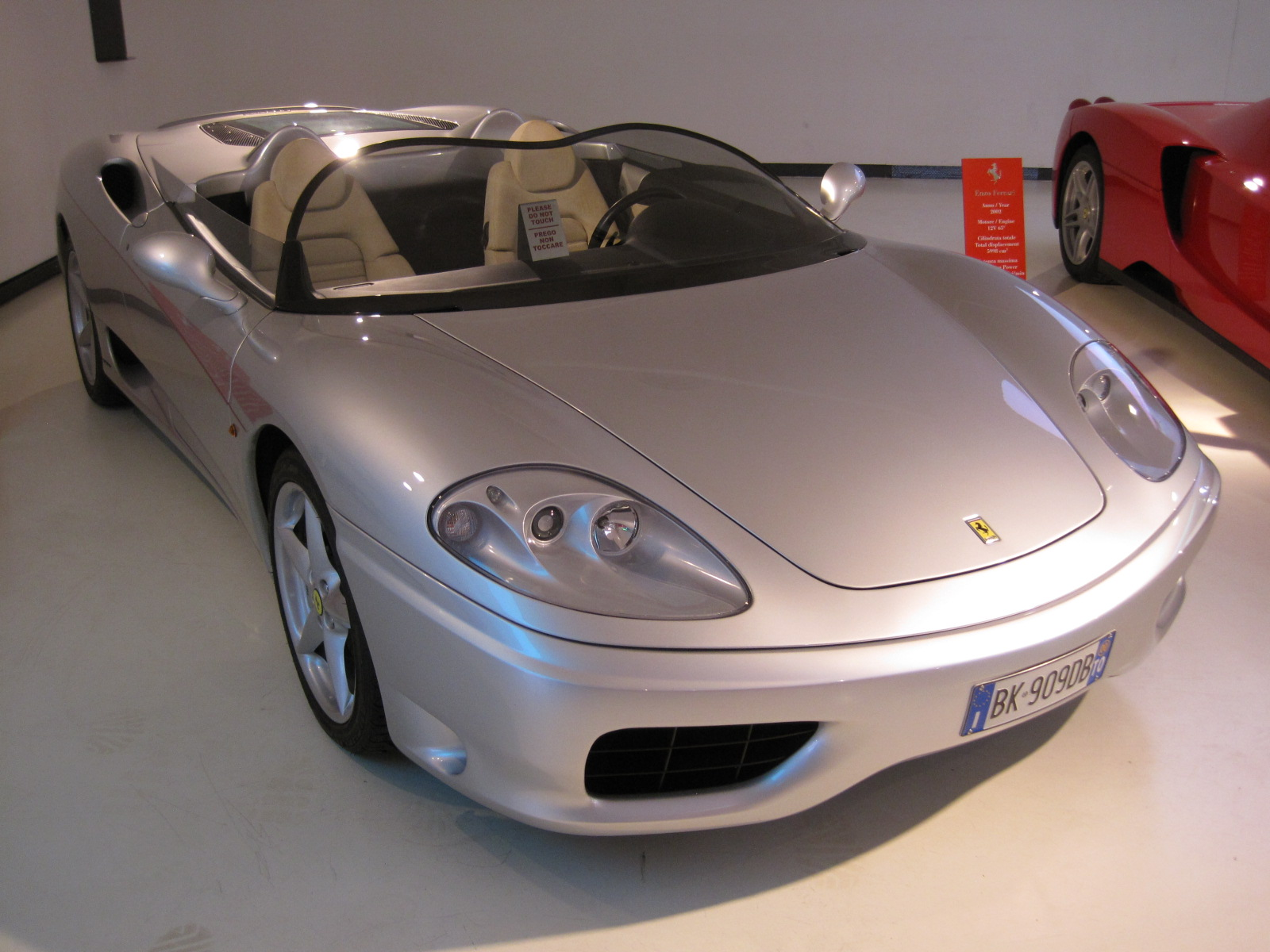
360 Barchetta

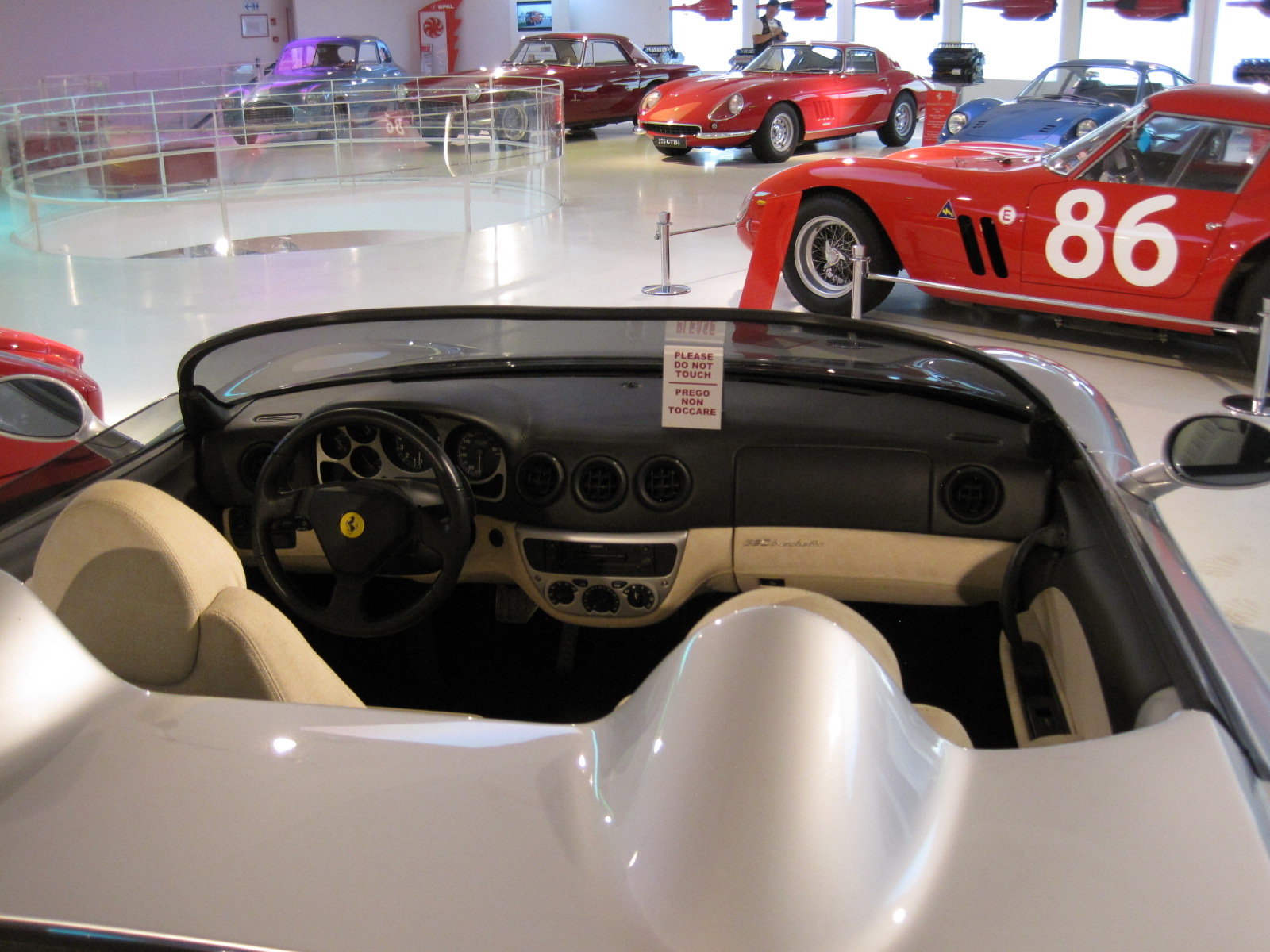
Interior

The Ferrari 360 Barchetta (serial number 120020) is a one-off based on the Ferrari 360 Spider which was commissioned by Gianni Agnelli in 2000 as a wedding present for the then Fiat chairman and president of Ferrari, Luca Cordero di Montezemolo. The car bears heavy resemblance to its donor with the only differences being the removal of the soft top system and roll bars, different engine cover and the addition of a visor in place of a windshield for better airflow over the car. Performance of the car remains the same as its donor and the car features Argento Nurburgring exterior paint with red pinstriping. The interior is black leather with cream fabric and features fabric seats with matching stitching, the words 360 Barchetta embroidered on the dashboard and a paddle-shift gearbox.

=== Challenge Stradale ===
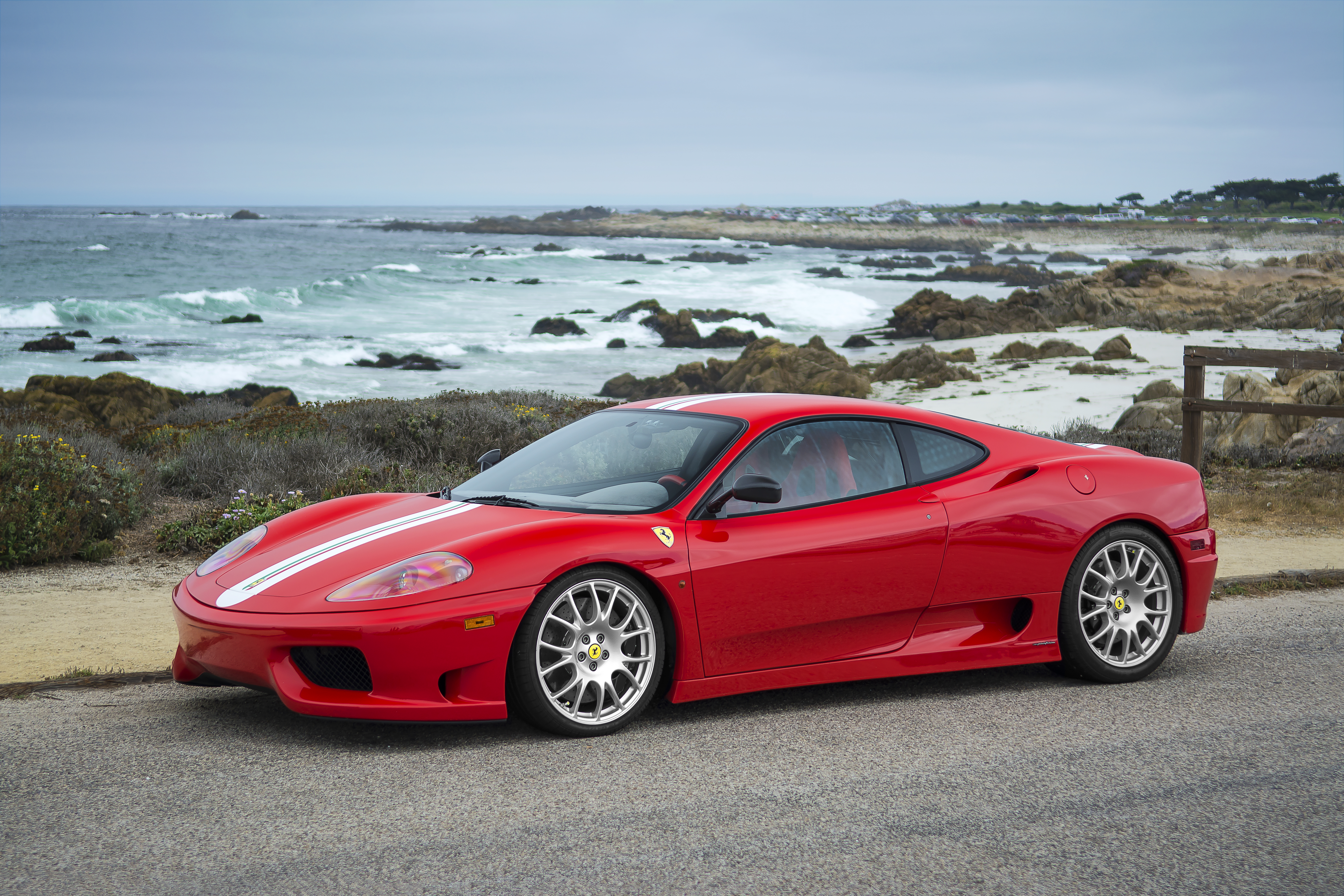

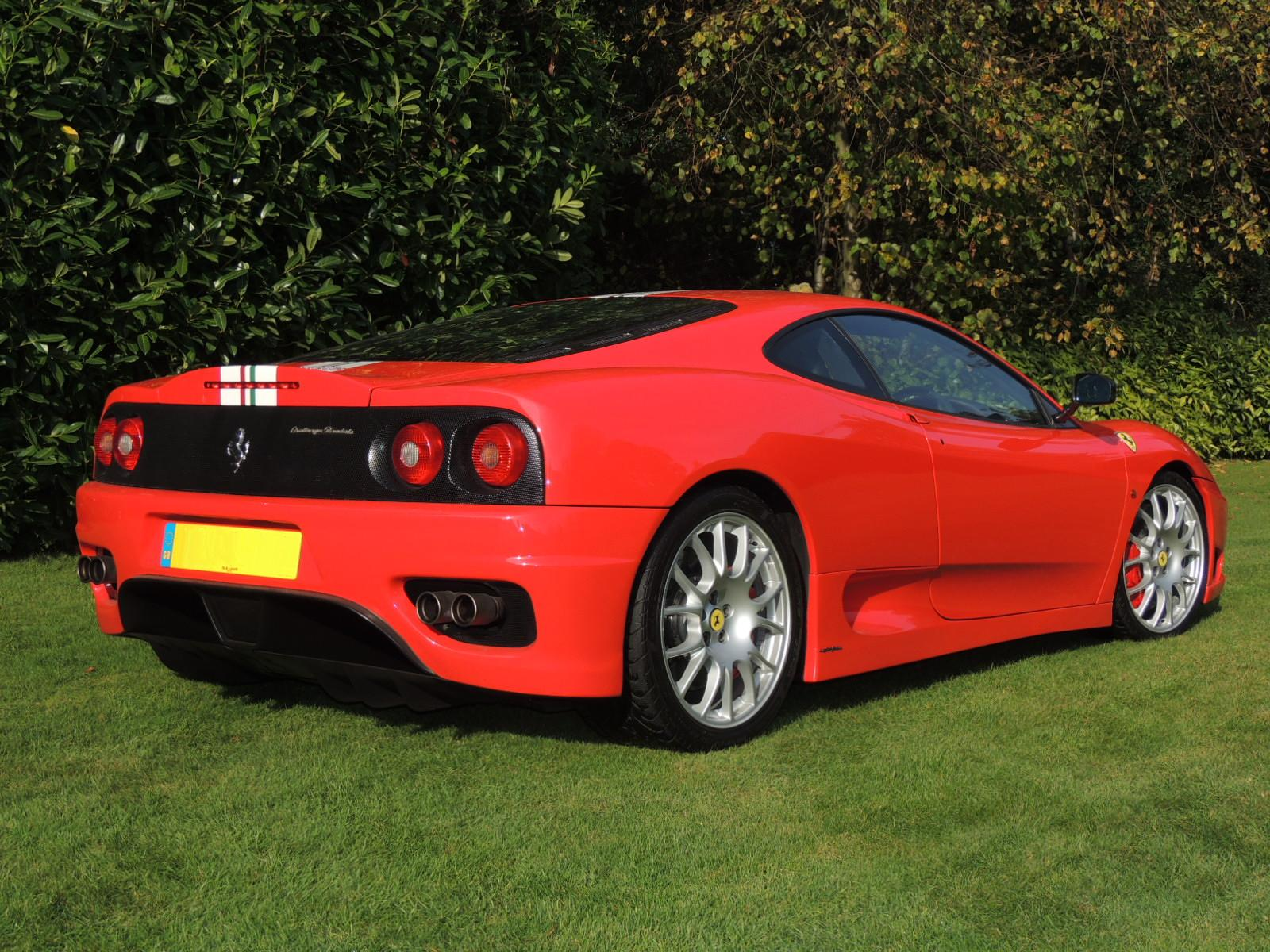
Ferrari Challenge Stradale

Inspired by the 360 Modena Challenge racing car series, the Challenge Stradale is the track-focused iteration of the 360 Modena which followed on in concept from the track focused F355 "Fiorano", which featured the "Fiorano Handling Pack" introduced in the final year of the Ferrari F355. The focus in development of the car was primarily on improving its track performance credentials by concentrating on handling, braking and weight reduction characteristics, which are essential in pure racing cars. Ferrari engineers designed the car from the outset with a goal of 20% track day use in mind and 80% road use. With only a small 25 hp (18 kW) improvement in engine power from the Modena (and boasting an improved power-to-weight ratio), the Challenge Stradale accelerates from 0–100 km/h (62 mph) in 4.1 seconds according to Ferrari. Systematic improvements were achieved to the setup and feel of the whole car; throttle response from the digital throttle was ratcheted up and feedback through the steering wheel was enhanced. Ceramic brakes borrowed from the Enzo, some lower weight parts and a FHP handling pack, enabled the Challenge Stradale to claim a 3.5 second improvement per lap of its Fiorano Circuit compared to the Modena.

In total, the Challenge Stradale is up to 110 kg (243 lb) lighter than the standard Modena if all the lightweight options are specified such as deleted radio, lexan (plexiglass) door windows and Alcantara fabric (instead of the leather option). As much as 74 kg (163 lb) was saved by lightening the bumpers, stripping the interior of its sound deadening and carbon mirrors and making the optional Modena carbon seats standard. Resin Transfer Moulding was utilised for the bumpers and skirts, a carry over from the Challenge cars which resulted in lighter bumpers than those on the Modena. The engine and transmission weight was lightened by 11 kg (24 lb) through the use of a smaller, lighter weight sports exhaust back box and valved exit pipes. The Challenge Stradale also got Brembo carbon ceramic brakes as standard (which later became standard fitment on the F430) which shaved 16 kg (35 lb) off the curb weight and improved handling by reducing unsprung weight and completely eliminating brake fade, as well as lightweight wheels specially made by BBS. Cars fitted with the centre console stereo option, sub speaker box behind the seats and glass side windows re-gained approximately 30 kg (66 lb) over the best selected options.

==== Dimensions ====
- Overall length: 4,477 mm (176.3 in)
- Overall width: 1,922 mm (75.7 in)
- Height: 1,199 mm (47.2 in)
- Wheelbase: 2,600 mm (102.4 in)
- Front track: 1,669 mm (65.7 in)
- Rear track: 1,617 mm (63.7 in)
- Dry weight: 1,180 kg (2,601 lb)
- Curb weight: 1,430 kg (3,153 lb)
- Fuel capacity: 95 L (25 US gal; 21 imp gal)

==== Engine ====
- Type: Naturally aspirated 90° V8 engine F131
- Position: Longitudinally-mounted Rear mid-engine, rear-wheel-drive layout
- Valvetrain: DOHC 5 valves per cylinder
- Fuel feed: Bosch Motronic 7.3 fuel injection
- Bore X stroke: 85 mm × 79 mm (3.35 in × 3.11 in)
- Total displacement: 3,586 cc (3.6 L; 218.8 cu in)
- Rev limiter: 8,650 rpm
- Compression ratio: 11.2:1
- Max. power: 425 PS (419 hp; 313 kW) at 8,500 rpm
- Max. torque: 373 N⋅m (38 kg⋅m; 275 lb⋅ft) at 4,750 rpm

==== Performance ====
- 0–60 mph (97 km/h): 4.0 seconds
- Top speed: Redline limited - 283 km/h (176 mph)
- Downforce: about 270 kgf (2.6 kN) at 300 km/h (186 mph) (without rear wing)
- Lift to drag: about -1.1:1

== Race models ==
=== 360 Challenge ===
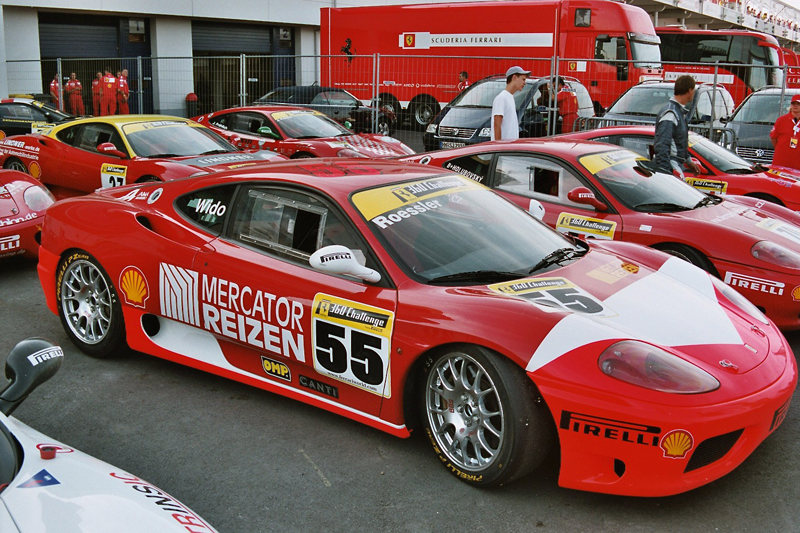
Ferrari 360 Challenge at the 2004 Ferrari Racing Days at the Nürburgring.

Based on the 360 Modena road car, the 360 Challenge was an extensively reworked, track-oriented model intended to compete in Ferrari's one-make racing series called the Ferrari Challenge. It was only available with the electrohydraulic-actuated automated manual transmission. At the time of launch, Ferrari claimed the 360 Challenge accelerated from 0–100 km/h (62 mph) in 3.9 seconds (0.6 seconds quicker than the standard 360 Modena F1) and could corner and brake significantly faster than the road car due to added aerodynamic elements. Brembo racing provided the upgraded Gold coloured calipers and larger floating two-piece discs, while Bosch provided the race-oriented ABS software. The exhaust system was lightened substantially and was one of the main contributions to the increased power output over the standard engine (as ignition mapping was claimed to virtually be the same). For the road cars (even the Challenge Stradale) Ferrari used a valve system that made the car more socially acceptable at lower revs (and therefore able to pass drive-by noise tests).

Less than 200 were made and marketed by Ferrari as a pure race car, requiring purchasers to enter their Ferrari 360 Challenge into the Ferrari Challenge race series as a condition of sale.

Unlike the previous Challenge race series, which utilised an F355 road car with a dealer-installed 'challenge upgrade' kit, the 360 Challenge was a factory-built track car. The enhanced driving characteristics and substantial weight reduction meant the car could comfortably outperform its road-going counterpart even though power from the 3.6-litre engine was claimed to be similar.

The 360 Challenge featured a stripped-down race-oriented interior with the stereo, electric windows and locks, soundproofing, airbags, air-conditioning, and even the handbrake removed. The seats and restraints were replaced by a single carbon-fibre racing seat and FIA approved restraint harnesses, and a roll cage was fitted for safety along with a fire suppression system. The instrument cluster was reworked with a monochrome LCD to display vital engine data. The adaptive suspension of the road car was replaced by adjustable racing dampers, while larger brakes with extra cooling ducts were added.

==== Official performance figures ====
- Power (SAE net): 416 PS (306 kW; 410 hp) at 8,500 rpm
- Torque (SAE net): 286 lb⋅ft (388 N⋅m) at 4,750 rpm
- 0–100 km/h (62 mph): 3.9 seconds
- Top speed (limited): 298 km/h (185 mph)
- Kerb weight: 1,250 kg (2,756 lb)
- Dry weight: 1,169 kg (2,577 lb)

=== 360 N-GT ===
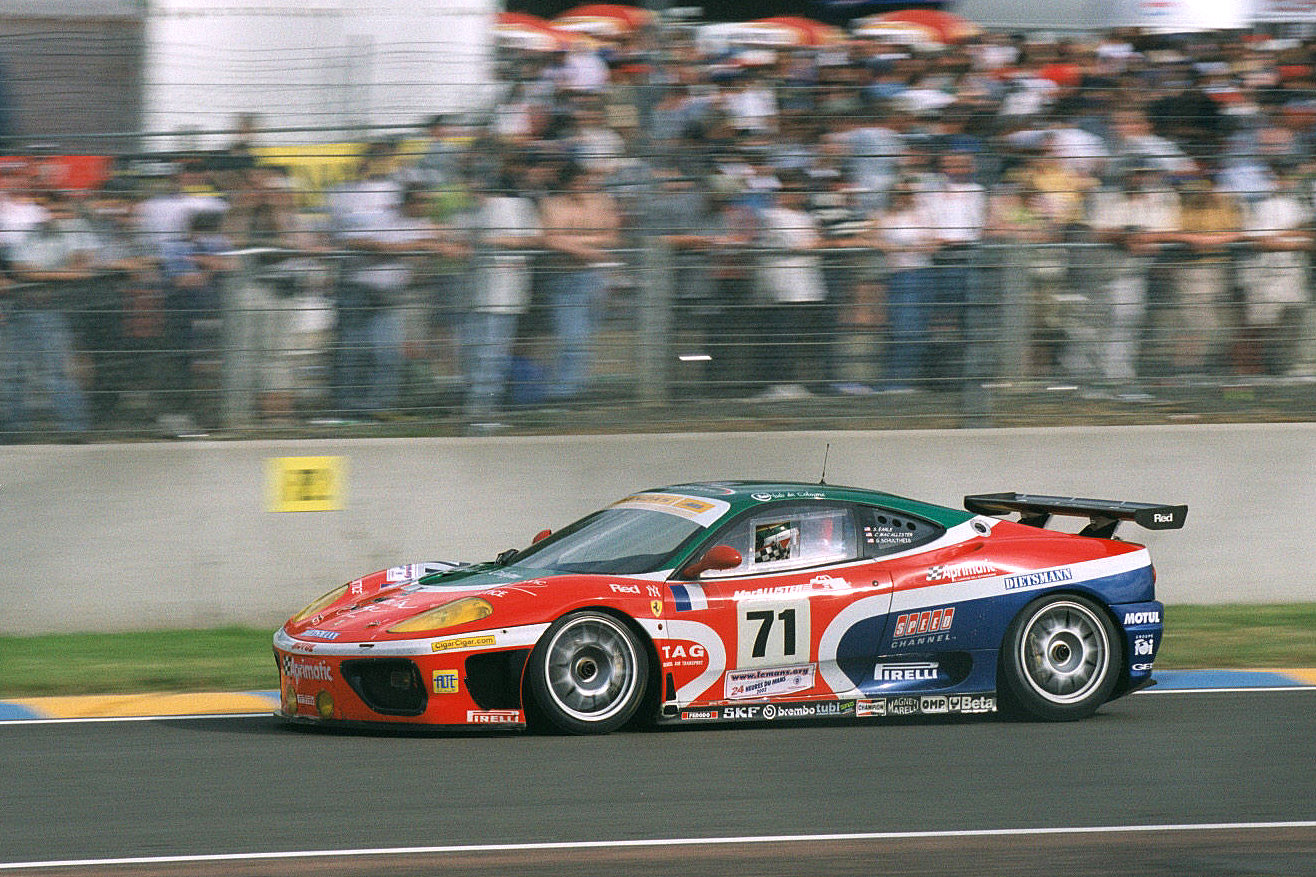
Ferrari 360 N-GT at the 2002 Le Mans 24 Hours.

The Ferrari 360 N-GT was a 360 Challenge race car tuned by Michelotto for the N-GT category of the FIA GT Championship. It was the fastest version of the Ferrari 360 with the engine generating a power output of over 547 PS (402 kW; 540 hp) when derestricted. The 360 N-GT was capable of a top speed of around 306 km/h (190 mph) with a 0–60 mph (97 km/h) acceleration time of around 3 seconds. It was the final car built through a Ferrari-Michelotto collaboration. The most recent major victory achieved by a 360 Michelotto was by SB Race Engineering at the 2011 Britcar Championship, where the 360 N-GT, as on many occasions, outperformed the newer F430 GT.

In 2002, a 360 N-GT was driven in the Australian Nations Cup Championship for GT style cars. Run by Prancing Horse Racing to replace the teams 360 Challenge and driven by highly successful Australian race driver John Bowe, the car would eventually place 3rd in the 2002 championship. Bowe and Steve Beards then finished 3rd in the N-GT at the 2002 Sandown 500. Their team mates for the race, Brad Jones and PHR Scuderia's Indonesian millionaire team owner Maher Algadrie, failed to finish after only completing 88 laps in their N-GT Ferrari. During the dry/wet Top 10 Runoff for pole position, Bowe and Jones unfortunately got caught in the wet part leaving them only 4th and 5th on the grid, ironically behind the 360 Challenge class G2 car of their 3rd placed team mate Paul Morris who had somewhat better weather conditions for his lap, and part-time driver Sam Newman who got the only dry lap in the runoff and put his PHR Scuderia 360 Challenge on pole by some 6.0448 seconds.

PHR then entered the Ferrari in the 2002 Bathurst 24 Hour race at the famous Mount Panorama Circuit, where Brad Jones put the 360 N-GT on pole position. After running in 2nd place behind the 7.0-litre Holden Monaro 427C which would go on to win the race outright, the 360 N-GT lost its oil pressure shortly after taking the lead when the Monaro had to pit to replace a flat front tyre. PHR then did an engine change in just 3 hours, only to have the replacement engine also lose oil pressure with Paul Morris in the car just under 3 hours later ending their race just before midnight. Bowe then finished 2nd in the 2003 Nations Cup Championship before the car was raced one last time in the 2003 Bathurst 24 Hour, where it was run by Austrian-based team BE Racing. Driven by David Brabham, Andrea Montermini, Klaus Engelhorn and Philipp Peter, the Ferrari qualified in 7th place and after running 3rd for a number of hours behind the Holden Monaros, was retired on lap 287.

=== 360 GT ===
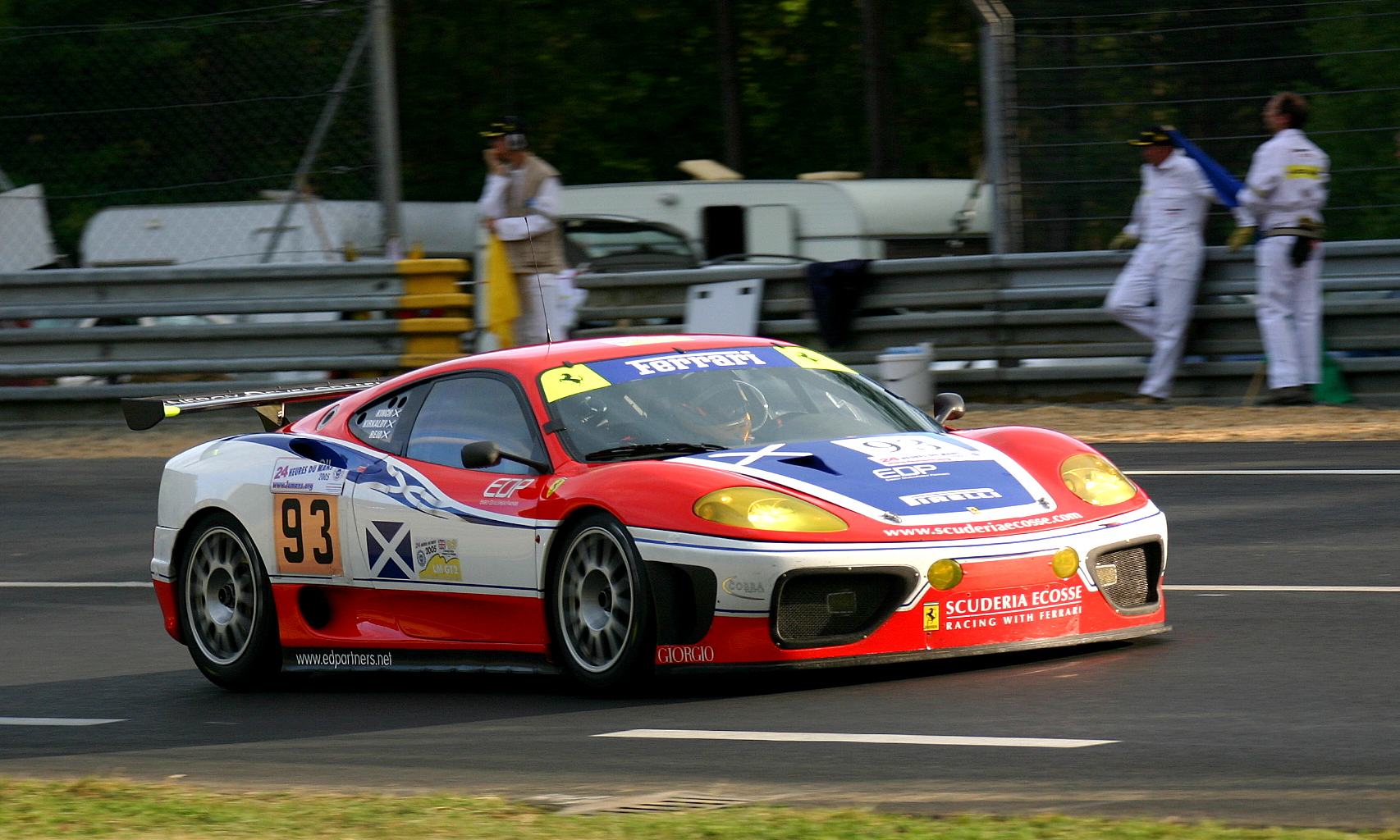
Ferrari 360 GT at the 2005 Le Mans 24 Hours.

The Ferrari 360 GT is a race version of the 360 Modena developed by the Ferrari Corse Clienti department in Maranello, in collaboration with Michelotto Automobili to compete in the FIA N-GT class. Team JMB Giesse raced the cars during the 2001 FIA GT Championship season and won the N-GT Cup for Drivers and the N-GT Cup for Teams. From 2002 to 2004, Ferrari produced and sold 20 360 GTs to customers through their Corse Clienti department.

The 3.6-litre V8 engine was tuned to generate a power output of 436 PS (321 kW; 430 hp) which was a significant improvement over the 360 Challenge cars. Significant additional weight reduction efforts were taken over the regular 360 Challenge cars such as lightening the wiring loom (saving 7 kg alone) as well as removing all unnecessary weight like air-conditioning brackets and doors which were now made from one-piece of carbon fibre along with the front compartment lid.

The final results of all the weight reduction in the 360 GT's kerb weight was 91 kg (200 lb) over the 360 Challenge cars 1,070 kg (2,359 lb). Ballast was used to bring the car back up to the regulation limit of 1,100 kg (2,425 lb).

=== 360 GTC ===
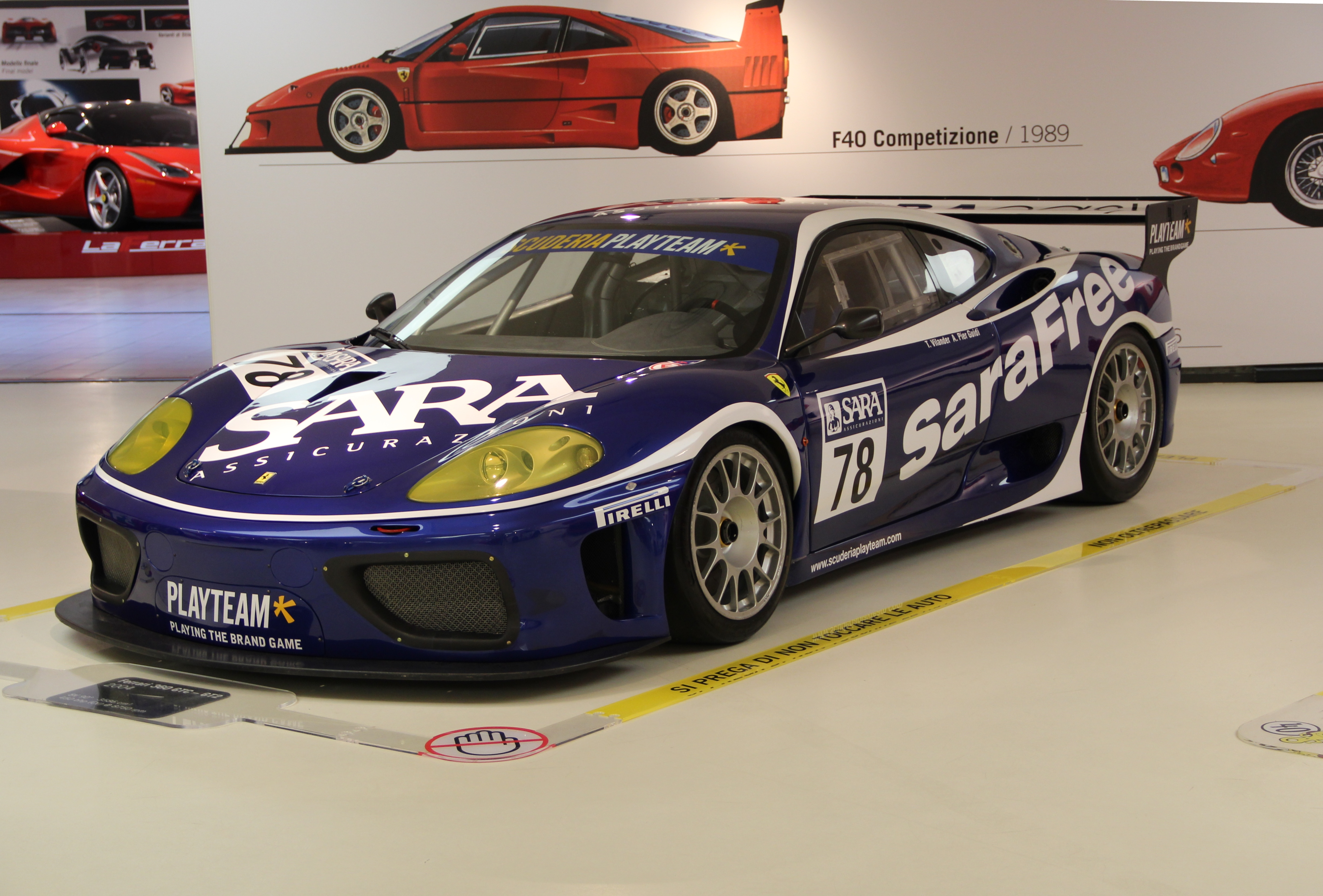
Ferrari 360 GTC at the Ferrari Museum in Maranello.

The Ferrari 360 GTC has been developed to replace the previous 360 GT. With a kerb weight of 1,100 kg (2,425 lb) (with ballast), it was built since 2004 by Ferrari Corse Clienti department in collaboration with Michelotto Automobili to compete in the N-GT class. It made use of recent evolutions successfully race tested on the Ferrari 360 GT, with a sequential six-speed gearbox and a further improved Magneti Marelli electronics package. The aerodynamics are substantially different from the 360 GT, given that the 360 GTC had been newly homologated by FIA/ACO from the Challenge Stradale, taking up from its basic elements: front bumper, side skirts, engine cover and double rear end. Wind tunnel research has led to a new system for the rear wing, with a notable improvement in vertical downforce. The performance of the 3,586 cc (3.6 L) 90-degree V8 engine has been improved in terms of fuel consumption.

In 2009, a privately owned Veloqx-Prodrive Racing 360 raced de-restricted, fully tuned variations of the GT-C in endurance races around the world including Silverstone, Sebring and Le-Mans.

The original 360GT's power output was 451 PS (332 kW; 445 hp) at 8,750 rpm, the GTC bettered that raising peak power to 479 PS (352 kW; 472 hp) while still breathing through the mandatory 30.8 mm (1.21 in) air restrictors. (Without the mandatory [for racing in N-GT class] air restrictors in place the engine dyno's at 550 PS (405 kW)).

==== Specifications ====
- Introduced at: 2003 Bologna Motor Show
- Body design: Pininfarina
- Weight: 1,000 kg (2,205 lb)
- Engine: F131 90° V8
- Engine location: Mid, longitudinally mounted
- Displacement: 3,586 cc (3.6 L; 218.8 cu in)
- Valvetrain: five valves / cylinder, DOHC
- Fuel feed: Magneti Marelli MR3 Fuel injection
- Aspiration: naturally aspirated
- Gearbox: six-speed sequential
- Drive: rear wheel drive

==== Performance ====
- Power: 351 kW (477 PS; 471 bhp) at 8,750 rpm [550 PS (405 kW; 542 hp) unrestricted]
- Torque: 440 N⋅m (325 lb⋅ft) at 6,500 rpm
- Power to displacement ratio: 131 hp/L (97 kW/L)
- Power-to-weight ratio: 472 hp/tonne (352 kW/tonne)
- Top speed: Over 320 km/h (200 mph)
- 0–100 km/h (62 mph): 4.2 seconds

== Reviews ==
Chris Harris reported that the 360 Modena press car was "ludicrously quick" (two seconds faster to 100 mph (161 km/h) than the customer car they tested) and sounded more like a racing car than a street car, but the other cars were different. While performance claims for the 360 were equal to or higher than the previous model, when Car and Driver tested a stock 360 it proved heavier and slower than its predecessor's claimed performance from five years before, this however can likely be attributed to choice of options fitted to the test car. Also US federal requirements for crash protection added weight back in for US designated models.
