= Manting Chan =

American singer-songwriter

- 陳文婷
- Born: New York City, New York, U.S.
- Occupation: Singer-songwriter
- Years active: 2011–present

Manting Chan (Chinese: 陳文婷;) is a Hong Kong-American singer and songwriter. Since her debut EP album Musical Journey was released in July 2011 by Sony Music Hong Kong, Manting has been called the "musical theater princess" by the Hong Kong media because of her sweet-heavenly voice and her love for musical theater.

== Early life ==
Manting was born in New York City, New York, and raised on Long Island. Her father is Chinese-Indonesian and her mother, from Fuzhou, Fujian, China. As a young child, Manting had her sights on what she wanted to become. It was either to be the first Asian-woman President of the United States or a singer. The event that changed her life was when Disney released Aladdin. It was the renowned song "A Whole New World" that made her choose the latter. She would sing the song and watch the movie every day for the entire school year. Manting entered the Metropolitan Opera Children's Choir at the age of 10 and was chosen by then music director, Elena Doria, to be one of the children singing in Puccini's La Boheme and later Khovanshchina, a Russian opera. It was then, Manting realized that she belonged to the stage.

== Career beginnings ==
Manting released her maiden EP album in July 2011 where she wrote music and lyrics to her song "A Boy". She also wrote the lyrics to the song "Our Time is Now" and "Feelings on Fire", which was featured in Barbara Wong's movie the Break Up Club (Fiona Sit and Jaycee Chan). C Kwan from 農夫 aka FAMA wrote "One Way Ticket" for Manting, which depicts her own story - buying a one way ticket to Hong Kong and creating a life there. Hanjin Tan 陳奐仁 helped with the music for "Good to be a Girl".

== Music Influences ==
Manting's main influences are Celine Dion, Teresa Teng 鄧麗君, and Luther Vandross. Musical Theater and Disney are her favorite genres, however, she is also very fond of Classical, AsianPop, Celtic, and Fado. She is able to sing in multiple languages including Cantonese, Mandarin, Japanese, Italian, Spanish, and English.
