= Xin buliao qing =

Xin Bu Liao Qing may refer to:

- Xin Bu Liao Qing (film) or C'est la vie, mon chéri, a Cantonese film
- Xin Bu Liao Qing (TV series) or C'est La Vie, Mon Chéri, a series starring Fiona Sit and Aloys Chen based on the film
  - "Xin bu liao qing", the series theme song by Jane Zhang and Fiona Sit, included on It's My Day
- "Xin bu liao qing", a song by Jam Hsiao from Love Moments

== See also ==
- Bu liao qing (disambiguation)
