= Don't Forget I Love You =

2022 Chinese-Hong Kong film by Wong Chun-chun

- Hong Kong theatrical release poster
- Traditional Chinese: 不要忘記我愛你
- Simplified Chinese: 不要忘记我爱你
- Hanyu Pinyin: Búyào Wàngjì Wǒ Ài Nǐ
- Directed by: Wong Chun-chun
- Written by: Wong Chun-chun; Gus Liem
- Produced by: Alvin Lam; Gus Liem
- Starring: Gulnazar; Jasper Liu
- Cinematography: Randy Che
- Production companies: Universe Entertainment Limited; Tao Piao Piao; Guangzhou Yingming Culture Communication Co., Ltd.
- Release dates: 14 February 2022 (China); 26 May 2022 (Hong Kong)
- Running time: 126 minutes
- Countries: China; Hong Kong
- Language: Mandarin

Don't Forget I Love You (Chinese: 不要忘记我爱你) is a 2022 romantic comedy film and the sequel to The Stolen Years. The film is a Chinese-Hong Kong co-production and was written and directed by Wong Chun-chun and starring Gulnazar and Jasper Liu. It follows the love story of a psychologist and a composer. It premiered in China on 14 February 2022 during the Valentine's Day, and on 26 May 2022 in Hong Kong.

== Cast ==
- Gulnazar as Xu Xingyue (许星玥), a psychologist.
- Jasper Liu as Lu Yao (陆尧), a composer with brain disorder after operation.
- Zhang Xinyi as Lu Hong
- Edward Ma as Matthew
- Zhang Yang
- Luo Ji

== Production ==
Principal photography started in Chengdu on 2 July 2021 and wrapped on August 26.

== Soundtrack ==
No.	Title	Lyrics	Music	Singer(s)	Length
1.	"No Matter What, I Do Love You (无论如何我爱你)" (Opening theme)	Cui Shu	Jason Lee, Aka Chio Wai Shan	Du Kani, Liu Xiaowen & Liu Yingwen

== Release ==
Don't Forget I Love You was released on 14 February and 26 May 2022 in mainland China and Hong Kong respectively.
