= XBF =

XBF may refer to:

- Extensible Application Markup Language
- Experimental Boundary Format, in Boundary representation
- "XBF", a song on the 2004 Fiona Sit album 'F' Debut
- Xe Bang Fai River, Laos
- LFHN (XBF) – Bellegarde – Vouvray Airport – Bellegarde, on List of airports by ICAO code: L
- XBF, a Variant of SARS-CoV-2
- abbreviations for ex-boyfriend
- abbreviations for ex-best friend
