= Me (Fiona album) =

Studio album by Fiona Sit
- Released: December 22, 2005
- Genre: Cantopop
- Producer: Warner Music Hong Kong

Fiona Sit chronology
Funny Girl	Me	Electric Angel

Me is the third album by Fiona Sit and was released on December 22, 2005. It contains seven tracks and an extensive mini-booklet containing pictures, writing, drawings, and personal blog entries by Fiona. It can be considered half autobiography and half album.

== History ==
Sit designed the cover herself and created the artwork using a digital drawing tablet. Three of the songs in the album were written by lyricist Wyman Wong. Within a month of the album's release, radio stations had played most of the album's songs numerous times.

== Reception ==
The Hong Kong Economic Times said the lead single, "There Is a Bird", would have been almost perfect if it had omitted the "tacked-on lines at the end that deviate from the original nursery rhyme". The reviewer noted that the song needs a huge vocal range, which Sit had trouble with when she sang live but that she had improved with the version in the album. Of "White Love", the reviewer said people who like "a mid-winter atmosphere" would find this song enjoyable. The Hong Kong Economic Times writer thought that "Finding Unicorn", whose lyrics were by Wyman Wong, "weaves a theme of self-empowerment and inspiration through fairy-tale imagery, a creative touch that adds extra appeal to the song".

New Monday praised "There Is a Bird" as the best song in the album, citing the quality of Wong's lyrics. The reviewer lamented that the album also included songs from the 2005 film Embrace Your Shadow and a Sammy & Kitty Drama Troupe stage production, thinking the inclusion of material from multiple sources made "the album as a whole feels less cohesive and polished than her previous two albums". Lam Chin-yin of East Week gave the album a score of 83 and recommended the songs "There Is a Bird" and "Finding Unicorn". Lam praised the songs as "so catchy that fans need only listen once or twice before they are eager to grab the microphone and sing along".

== Track listing ==
1. 有隻雀仔 (There is a bird)
2. 尋找獨角獸 (Finding Unicorn)
3. 水 (Water)
4. 白色戀人 (White Love)
5. 愛 (Love)
6. 你在那裡 (Where are You)
7. 從金銀島寄來的信 (Letter from Treasure Island)
