= Tian mi mi (disambiguation) =

Tian mi mi (Chinese: 甜蜜蜜; lit. 'Sweet') is a song by Teresa Wang

Tian mi mi may also refer to:

- Comrades: Almost a Love Story (called "Tianmimi" in Chinese release), a 1996 Hong King film
- Tian Mimi, a book by Theresa Fu
- "Sweet", a song by Fiona Fit from the 2008 album Smile
- "Sweet", a song by Leo Ku from the 2005 album Star Track
