= Lu Jie =

Lu Jie may refer to:

- Ed Lu (born 1963), or Lu Jie, Chinese American physicist
- Lü Jie (born 1984), Chinese model and actress
