= Park Eun-hye =

South Korean actress (born 1977)

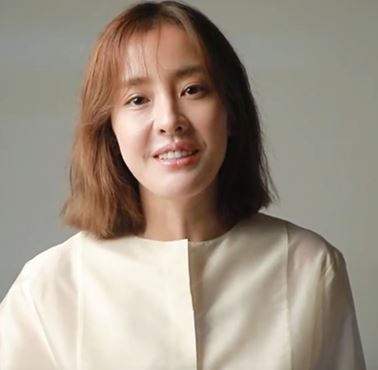
- Park in 2018
- Born: February 21, 1977 (age 49); Incheon, South Korea
- Education: Seoul Institute of the Arts – Creative Advertising
- Occupation: Actress
- Years active: 1998–present
- Agent(s): Sky E&M
- Spouse: Kim Han-sup (m. 2008; div. 2018)
- Children: 2

Korean name
- Hangul: 박은혜
- Hanja: 朴恩惠
- RR: Bak Eunhye
- MR: Pak Ŭnhye

Park Eun-hye (Korean: 박은혜; born February 21, 1977) is a South Korean actress. She is best known for starring in Jewel in the Palace, which led to her popularity in China. She also played the lead role in the Taiwanese drama, Silence, starring Vic Chou, and directed by Zhang Zhong.

== Career ==
Park Eun-hye entered the entertainment industry in 1998, but she only rose to fame in 2003 with a supporting role in hit MBC TV series Dae Jang Geum (also known as Jewel in the Palace), which enjoyed tremendous popularity throughout Asia.

After a secondary lead role in 18 vs. 29, she further solidified her status as a major Korean Wave star with the success of another period drama Yi San (2007) and her Taiwanese series Silence opposite heartthrob Vic Zhou (2006).

Park decided to star in Hong Sang-soo's 2008 art film Night and Day even without a salary, and her performance received a Best New Actress award from the prestigious Busan Film Critics Association, her first award in ten years of acting. The next year she returned to television playing a femme fatale in daily drama Pink Lipstick.

In 2012 she began co-hosting on cable the variety shows Queen of Beauty on KBS Drama, and Sold Out on tvN.

Park is more popular in China than in her native South Korea, as the sales of the Chinese brands she models for—Hana Cosmetics and Yonseng Tangerine Chocolates (the latter named after her character in Dae Jang Geum) -- went over 25 million dollars in the year 2009.

== Personal life ==
Park Eun-hye married entrepreneur Kim Han-sup on April 27, 2008, at Shilla Hotel in Seoul. She gave birth to fraternal twin sons, Kim Jae-wan and Kim Jae-ho, in 2011. On September 14, 2018, it was reported that she finalized her divorce from her former husband earlier that same month, with the cause for the divorce being irreconcilable differences. Her agency later released a statement confirming that she had parted ways with her husband, and that she would be raising their children.

== Filmography ==
=== Television series ===
| Year | Title | Role |
|---|---|---|
| 1995 | LA Arirang | |
| 2000 | Good Friends 1 | |
| 2001 | Everyday with You | Jo Se-hee |
| 2003 | Jewel in the Palace | Lee Yeon-saeng |
| 2004 | Little Women | Jung Hyun-deuk |
| 2004 | Island Village Teacher | Yoon Ji-young |
| 2005 | Eighteen, Twenty-Nine | Shin Ji-young |
| 2006 | Fireworks Display | Cha Mi-rae |
| 2006 | Silence | Zhao Shen Shen |
| 2007 | The Person I Love | Yoon Hyun-joo |
| 2007 | Lee San, Wind of the Palace | Queen Hyoui |
| 2008 | Detective Mr. Lee | Lee Chae-young |
| 2010 | Pink Lipstick | Yoo Ga-eun |
| 2012 | Can't Live Without You | Seo In-hye/Park So-hyun |
| 2013 | Two Women's Room | Min Kyung-chae |
| 2014 | KBS Drama Special: "Vengeful Spirit" | Min Yoo-sun |
| 2015 | The Merchant: Gaekju 2015 | Chun So-rye |
| 2016 | A Beautiful Mind | Shim Eun-ha (cameo) |
| 2017 | Sweet Enemy | Oh Dal-Nim |
| 2020 | Hi Bye, Mama! | Pil-seung's mother |
| 2020 | Mystic Pop-up Bar | Queen/Shin Ji-hye |
| 2020 | Get Revenge | Broadcasting host |
| 2021 | High Class | Sejun-mam (Cameo) |
| 2021 | The King's Affection | Lady Kim |
| 2022 | Alchemy of Souls | Jin Ho-gyeong |

=== Web series ===
| Year | Title | Network | Role | Ref. |
|---|---|---|---|---|
| 2021 | Fly Again | Kakao TV | Goo Song-yi | |

=== Films ===
| Year | Title | Role |
|---|---|---|
| 1998 | Zzang | Yoo Hye-ri |
| 2000 | 01412 Sect of the Magic Sword | Princess January |
| 2000 | The Record | Hee-jung |
| 2001 | Dream of a Warrior | Nam-hong |
| 2005 | Daddy-Long-Legs | Girl in flashbacks |
| 2006 | February 29 | Han Ji-yeon |
| 2006 | Sunflower | Lee Eun-mi |
| 2008 | Night and Day | Lee Yoo-jeong |
| 2015 | Enemies In-Law | Park Young-mi |
| 2017 | Steel Rain | Kwon Sook-jung |
| 2024 | The Guardian | |

=== Television shows ===
| Year | Title | Role | Notes/Ref. |
|---|---|---|---|
| 2004 | Music Bank | MC | with Ji Sung |
| 2006 | Maldalrija | Cast Member | |
| 2012 | Queen of Beauty | Host | |
| 2012 | Sold Out | Host | |
| 2014 | Now On My Way to Meet You | Cast Member | |
| 2014 | The King of Food | Host | |
| 2021 | On Air Money Life | Host | |
| 2022 | People of the Health Office | Host | |
| 2022 | Lan Line Beauty | Host | |
| 2022 | Shall I Light Your Daily Life | Host | |
| 2022 | Korea After School: Field Trip | Host | Season 1 |
| 2022 | Party Resolution | Host | Season 1–2 |

== Awards and nominations ==
| Year | Award | Category | Nominated work | Result |
|---|---|---|---|---|
| 2008 | 9th Busan Film Critics Awards | Best New Actress | Night and Day | Won |
| 2009 | 2nd Korea Sharing Awards | Chairman's Award | —N/a | Won |
| 2010 | MBC Drama Awards | Excellence Award, Actress | Pink Lipstick | Won |
| 2011 | Ministry of Health and Welfare | Citation | —N/a | Won |
| 2012 | MBC Drama Awards | Top Excellence Award, Actress in a Serial Drama | Can't Live Without You | Nominated |
| 2013 | SBS Drama Awards | Top Excellence Award, Actress in a Weekend/Daily Drama | Two Women's Room | Nominated |
| 2014 | KBS Drama Awards | Excellence Award, Actress in a One-Act/Special/Short Drama | Vengeful Spirit | Nominated |
| 2025 | APAN Star Awards | Excellence Award, Actress in a Serial Drama | Marie and Her Three Daddies | Won |
