= Girls 2 =

2018 Chinese-Hong Kong-Vietnamese film by Wong Chun-chun

- Theatrical release poster

Chinese name
- Traditional Chinese: 閨蜜2：無二不作
- Simplified Chinese: 闺蜜2：无二不作

Vietnamese name
- Vietnamese: Girls 2: Những Cô Gái và Găng Tơ
- Directed by: Wong Chun-chun
- Written by: Wong Chun-chun; Hou Yingyan; Zheng Shan-yu; Daryl Doo
- Produced by: Angus Law-Chiu Chan; Andy Chen; Gus Liem; Tony Lin; Wong Chun-chun
- Starring: Fiona Sit; Ivy Chen; Janine Chang; Mike Tyson; Wang Shuilin
- Cinematography: Pakie Chan
- Edited by: Curran Pang
- Music by: Mark Lui
- Production companies: Perfect Sky Pictures Co., LTD. Acutance Pictures Corp. of China
- Distributed by: Hengye Pictures
- Release dates: 2 March 2018 (China); 8 March 2018 (Hong Kong)
- Running time: 120 minutes
- Countries: China; Hong Kong; Vietnam
- Languages: Mandarin; Vietnamese
- Box office: $10.2 million

Girls 2 (Chinese: 闺蜜2：无二不作; Vietnamese: Girls 2: Những Cô Gái và Găng Tơ; also titled Girls vs Gangsters) is a 2018 comedy film directed by Wong Chun-chun and starring Fiona Sit, Ivy Chen, Janine Chang, Mike Tyson, and Wang Shuilin. The film is a sequel to the 2014 film Girls and was released on March 2, 2018, in China.

== Cast ==
- Fiona Sit as Kimmy
- Ivy Chen as Xiwen
- Janine Chang as Jialan
- Mike Tyson as Dragon
- Wang Shuilin as Jingjing
- Trần Bảo Sơn (Chen Baoshan) as Gang leader
- Vila Fan as Gang leader ex-wife (Mariya)
- Nguyễn Kim Hồng @ Elly Trần as Gang assistant
- Gus Liem as Priest
- Cecilia Sun as Shop Girl
- Loi Tran as Gigolo leader
- Petey Majik Nguyễn as Magician
- Nina Komolova as Magician's assistant
- Wen-Hsueh Lu @ Louis Lo as Xiwen's father
- Tzu-Hui Tseng as Xiwen's mother

== Production ==
Shooting began in July 2016 and ended in August 2016. This film was primarily shot in Vietnam.

== Release ==
The film was released in China on March 2, 2018.
