= The Stolen Years =

The Stolen Years may refer to:

- The Stolen Years (1998 film), a Spanish film
- The Stolen Years (2013 film), a Chinese film
