= La Comédie humaine (film) =

2010 Hong Kong film by Chan Hing-ka and Janet Chun

- Film poster
- Traditional Chinese: 人間喜劇
- Simplified Chinese: 人间喜剧
- Hanyu Pinyin: Ren Jian Xi Ju
- Jyutping: Jan4 Gaan1 Hei2 Kek6
- Directed by: Chan Hing-ka; Janet Chun
- Written by: Chan Hing-ka; Janet Chun
- Produced by: Chan Hing-Ka; Amy Chin Siu-Wai
- Starring: Chapman To; Wong Cho-lam; Fiona Sit
- Cinematography: Horace Wong Wing-Hang
- Edited by: Cheung Ka-fai
- Music by: Andy Cheung Yan-Kit; Chiu Tsang-Hei
- Production company: Film Development Fund of Hong Kong
- Release date: 8 July 2010
- Running time: 100 minutes
- Country: Hong Kong
- Languages: Cantonese; Mandarin; English

La Comédie humaine (Chinese: 人間喜劇; pinyin: Rénjiān Xǐjù; Jyutping: Yan Gaan Hei Kat; lit. 'The Human Comedy') is a 2010 Hong Kong comedy film directed and written by Chan Hing-ka and Janet Chun. Released in cinemas on 8 July 2010, it premiered at the 31 March 2010 Hong Kong International Film Festival.

== Plot ==
The story revolves around a Spring (To), a hitman from mainland China who is on a mission in Hong Kong with his partner Setting Sun (Hui). However, Spring falls ill and comes under the care of a screenwriter by the name of Soya (Wong) and they find themselves developing into a tight and everlasting friendship.

== Cast ==
- Chapman To as Spring
- Wong Cho-lam as Soya
- Fiona Sit as Tin-Oi
- Kama Law as Maggie Chan
- Benz Hui as Setting Sun
- Chiu Tien-you
- Lee Lik-chi

== Critical reception ==
The film has been generally received neutrally. Chan Hing-Ka's vision was criticised for having been "poorly paced."
