= 2004 RTHK Top 10 Gold Songs Awards =

Hong Kong music awards ceremony

The 2004 RTHK Top 10 Gold Songs Awards (Chinese: 第二十七屆十大中文金曲頒獎音樂會) was held in 2005 for the 2004 music season.

== Top 10 song awards ==
The top 10 songs (十大中文金曲) of 2003 are as follows. This year only 9 songs were awarded.

Song name in Chinese	Artist	Composer	Lyricist
世上只有	Joey Yung	Chan Kwong-Wing	Wyman Wong
愛與誠	Leo Ku	Cou syut-fan (曹雪芬)	Albert Leung
飲歌	Twins	Ronald Ng (伍樂城)	Albert Leung
七里香	Jay Chou	Jay Chou	Vincent Fang
空中飛人	Hacken Lee	Li zung-hang (李仲衡)	Hacken Lee
小城大事	Miriam Yeung	Mark Lui	Albert Yeung
好好戀愛	Alex Fong	Horan Chan	Fong git (方杰)
奇洛李維斯回信	Fiona Sit	Fong yu-loeng (方樹樑)	Wyman Wong
美中不足	Andy Hui, Deanie Ip	Mark Lui	Wyman Wong

== Other awards ==
Award	Song or album (if available)	Recipient
Outstanding singer award (優秀流行歌手大獎)	-	Twins, Leo Ku, Hacken Lee, Jay Chou, Joey Yung, Jacky Cheung, Gigi Leung, Andy Hui, Anthony Wong, Kelly Chen, Miriam Yeung, Andy Lau
Outstanding female singer award (最優秀流行女歌手大獎)	-	Joey Yung
Outstanding male singer award (最優秀流行男歌手大獎)	-	Hacken Lee
Sales award for male artists (全年最高銷量歌手大獎)	-	Hacken Lee, Jay Chou
Sales award for female artists (全年最高銷量歌手大獎)	-	Twins, Joey Yung
Best new male prospect award (最有前途新人獎)	-	(gold) Juno Mak (silver) Endy Chow (bronze) Jaycee Chan
Best new female prospect award (最有前途新人獎)	-	(gold) Fiona Sit (silver) Yan Ng (bronze) Ella Koon
Best group prospect award (最有前途新人獎)	-	(gold) F.I.R. (silver) Ping Pung (bronze) Girl's only dormitory (女生宿舍)
Most improved award (全年最佳進步獎)	-	Leo Ku
Distinguished guest performance (嘉賓表演)	-	Andy Lau
CASH international best Chinese song award (CASH全球華語最佳新進作曲人獎)	-	F.I.R.
CASH international best Chinese lyrics award (CASH全球華語最佳新進作詞人獎)	-	F.I.R.
Mainland recommendation award (內地推薦大獎)	-	Sunyue, Sun Nan
National best Chinese song award (全國最受歡迎中文歌曲獎)	對不起不是你 江南 衝動的懲罰	(gold) Kelly Chen, 孫偉明/吳國敬, Wyman Wong (silver) JJ Lin, Li seoi-seon (李瑞洵) (bronze) Dao Lang
RTHK Golden needle award (金針獎)	-	Liza Wang
National most popular male singer award (全國最受歡迎歌手獎)	-	(gold) Andy Lau (silver) Jay Chou (bronze) Hacken Lee
National most popular female singer award (全國最受歡迎歌手獎)	-	(gold) Kelly Chen (silver) Stefanie Sun (bronze) Joey Yung
National most popular group award (全國最受歡迎歌手獎)	-	(gold) Twins (silver) F.I.R. (bronze) S.H.E
International Chinese award (全球華人至尊金曲獎)	愛與誠	Leo Ku, Cou syut-fa (曹雪芬), Albert Leung
Four channel award (四台聯頒獎項)	-	Joey Yung, Mark Lui, Wyman Wong
