= Buliao qing =

Bu liao qing (不了情) may refer to:

- Bu Liao Qing (1947 film), written by Eileen Chang
- Bu Liao Qing, also called Love Without End, a 1961 film, starring Lin Dai
- "Buliao qing" (song), a 1961 Mandarin song
- Bu liao qing, an album by Tsai Chin
- Bu Liao Qing (TV series), a 1989 Taiwanese television series, starring Kenny Ho (actor)

== See also ==
- Xin Bu Liao Qing (disambiguation)
