= Funny Girl (Fiona album) =

Album by Fiona Sit

Studio album by Fiona Sit 薛凱琪
- Released: April 21, 2005
- Genre: Cantopop
- Producer: Warner Music Hong Kong

Fiona Sit 薛凱琪 chronology
"886"	Funny Girl	Me

Funny Girl is the second album by Fiona Sit. It was released on April 21, 2005. It contains eleven tracks, and is the first and so far only album by Sit includes a song in French, a language Fiona excels in. It is the French adaptation of Laura Pausini's "Cuando Se Ama". Subsequently, "I Want to Stay" is the Cantonese adaptation of it. A second version was released on June 9, 2005, that contained a bonus DVD with music videos.

== Track listing ==
1. 前菜 (Entrée)
2. 小黑與我 (Blackie and Me)
3. 男孩像你 (A Boy Just Like You)
4. 拒絕畢彼特 (Rejecting Brad Pitt)
5. 快樂到天亮 (Happy till Dusk)
6. 我想留低 (I Want to Stay)
7. 瞬間轉移 (Teleportation)
8. 未約定 (Unstable Engagement)
9. Zentrix
10. Si j'etais Carla (I Want to Stay French version)
11. You Were Meant For Me
