= Silence (TV series) =

2006 Taiwanese TV series

- Also known as: 深情密碼
- Directed by: Zhang Zhongyi
- Starring: Vic Chou; Park Eun-hye; Andy Hui; Megan Lai; Kingone Wang
- Opening theme: "Sillently" (靜靜的) by Harlem Yu
- Ending theme: "Familiar Gentleness" (熟悉的溫柔) by Vic Chou
- Country of origin: Taiwan
- Original language: Mandarin
- No. of episodes: 19

Production
- Producers: Chai Zhiping and Hsiao Dingyi
- Production locations: Taiwan, Qingdao
- Running time: Sundays at 22:00
- Production company: Comic Ritz International Production

Original release
- Network: China Television (CTV)
- Release: 21 May – 24 September 2006

Silence (traditional Chinese: 深情密碼; simplified Chinese: 深情密码; pinyin: Shen Qing Mi Ma) is a 2006 Taiwanese drama starring Vic Chou, Park Eun-hye, Andy Hui, Megan Lai, and Kingone Wang. It was produced by Comic Ritz International Production and Chai Zhiping and Hsiao Dingyi as producers and directed by Zhang Zhongyi. The series premiered in Taiwan on free-to-air China Television (CTV) from May 21, 2006, to September 24, 2006, every Sunday at 22:00. It was also shown on cable TV Eastern Television (ETTV).

== Synopsis ==
When Qi Weiyi (Vic Chou) was 15, he won a swimming competition and broke his leg, resulting in the alias "Plastered Leg". Zhao Shenshen ditched school one day with her next-door neighbor, Zuo Jun, and got into a bus accident, leading her to be mute ever since. One day, on her way to the hospital, Shenshen's mom got hit by a car and did not survive. As both Weiyi and Shenshen feel lonely, they send and receive messages at an abandoned bomb shelter. After sometime, they meet each other and start communicating, with Weiyi unaware of Shenshen's past.

== Cast ==
- Vic Chou as Qi Weiyi
- Park Eun-hye as Zhao Shenshen
- Andy Hui as Zhuo Jun
- Megan Lai as Mi Xiao Guang
- Kingone Wang as Yellow
- Jin Dong as Hu Hanxi
- Lin Mei-hsiu as Huang Chihling

== Awards ==
Year	Ceremony	Category	Recipient	Result
2007	42nd Golden Bell Awards	Best Supporting Actress	Linda Liu	Nominated
