= Two Wrongs Make a Right =

2017 Chinese-Hong Kong film by Vincent Kok

- Theatrical release poster
- Traditional Chinese: 天生不對
- Simplified Chinese: 天生不对
- Hanyu Pinyin: Tiān shēng bù duì
- Jyutping: tin1 saang1 bat1 deoi3
- Directed by: Vincent Kok
- Written by: Vincent Kok; Anselm Chan; E.W.Y. Tang; Yau Yee-Kei
- Produced by: Cheng Jin; Grace Song; Paco Wong
- Starring: Vic Chou; Fiona Sit; Ronald Cheng
- Cinematography: Tam Wai Kai
- Edited by: Kwong Chi-Leung; Li Ka-Wing
- Music by: Dennie Wong Tan-Yee; Victor Tse
- Distributed by: Hengye Pictures; Sun Entertainment Culture
- Release date: 10 November 2017 (China)
- Running time: 90 minutes
- Countries: China; Hong Kong
- Languages: Mandarin; Cantonese

Two Wrongs Make a Right is a 2017 romantic comedy film written and directed by Vincent Kok, starring Vic Chou, Fiona Sit and Ronald Cheng.

== Cast ==
- Vic Chou as Qin Rui
- Fiona Sit as He Peipei
- Ronald Cheng as Ximen Ding
- Tien Niu as Peipei's mother
- Jack Kao as Qin Rui's father
- Joy Sheng

== Soundtrack ==
No.	Title	Writer(s)	Performer	Length
1.	"Tian Sheng Yi Dui 天生一對"	Wawa, Khalil Fong, Gareth Chan	Fiona Sit feat. Khalil Fong	04:41

== See also ==
- My Lucky Star (2003), a feng shui-themed film by Vincent Kok
