= The Secret (2016 film) =

- Poster
- Chinese: 消失爱人
- Directed by: Wong Chun-chun
- Written by: Wong Chun-chun; Silver Hau; Skipper Cheng; Daryl Doo
- Produced by: Wong Chun-chun; Gus Liem
- Starring: Leon Lai; Wang Luodan
- Cinematography: Chen Cheng
- Edited by: Curran Pang
- Music by: Mark Lui
- Production companies: Heng Ye Film Distribution; Fujian Zhenhengye Media; Beijing Wanmei Xingkong Media; Media Asia Film Distribution (Beijing); Zhejiang Tianmao Technology; Beijing Qianxiang Wangjing Technology; Beijing Funshion Network
- Distributed by: Heng Ye Film Distribution
- Release date: January 15, 2016
- Running time: 109 minutes
- Country: China
- Language: Mandarin
- Box office: CN¥64.2 million (China)

The Secret (Chinese: 消失爱人) is a 2016 Chinese suspense romance film directed by Wong Chun-chun. It was released in China on January 15, 2016.

== Plot ==
Kaifeng lost his beloved wife Qiu Jie in an avalanche accident. In order to find his lost lover, he tried various methods of summoning spirits. Surprisingly, Qiu Jie's soul really came back. Kaifeng found a psychic, hoping to keep his wife. The psychic told Kaifeng a secret: only people who love her can see her, and those who don't love her can't see her, and she must not be allowed to know that she is a soul, otherwise she will disappear soon. Knowing that this reunion is short-lived and will always end one day, Kaifeng and his son can only work hard to keep this secret. By chance, Kaifeng's cousin Jimmy saw Qiu Jie's soul, and at this time, the snow mountain incident began to be reported by the media. Seeing that the fact that Qiu Jie is a soul will be discovered, more unexpected things are approaching step by step.

== Cast ==
- Leon Lai as Kai-feng
- Wang Luodan as Qiu-jie
- JJ Lin as Jimmy
- Sandrine Pinna as Yanzi
- Shek Sau
- Patrick J Molloy as Willie Robinson
- Nick Murphy as Checkpoint Soldier

== Reception ==
The film grossed CN¥64.154 million in China.
