= I'm Not F4 =

Studio album by Vic Chou
- Released: 29 October 2007 (China); 29 November 2007(Japan)
- Genre: Pop, Mandopop, C-pop
- Label: Sony BMG Music Entertainment (Hong Kong) Limited

Vic Chou chronology
Remember, I Love You (2004)	I'm Not F4 (2007)

I'm Not F4 (Chinese title: 我不是F4, pinyin: Wo Bu Shi F4) is the English title of Vic Chou's third solo album, released in October 2007. Singer-actor and F4-member Vic Chou returns to the Mandopop after years of absence as he had been busy with television shows. His last solo album Remember, I Love You was released in 2004.

== Information about the album ==
Chou coincidentally came across Jay Chou, a Taiwanese pop singer, one day and jokingly asked whether he would like to write a song for him, and Chou unexpectedly agreed. So Jay Chou wrote a song for Chou, called I'm Not F4. The song is a reflection of Chou's inner self, as he wants to let his fans know who he is as an individual beyond being an actor and a member of F4. He shunned no efforts to really let his presence be felt on his new album, participating in every step of the way, from finding and selecting songs to the track arrangement.

== Track listing ==
1. "馬賽克" (4:00)
2. "我不是F4" / I'm Not F4" (3:47)
3. "完美偶像" (4:57)
4. "藍鯨" (4:34)
5. "一加一" (4:23)
6. "愛上這世界" (4:01)
7. "愛你恨你" (4:09)
8. "他是誰" (3:25)
9. "有沒友" (3:33)
10. "Missing You" (5:27)

The editions of the album released in Asia come with a bonus track titled "Wherever You Are".

== Sources ==
- Vic's New Album - I'm Not F4 - Openes Up His True Self
