= Don't Go Breaking My Heart 2 =

2014 Hong Kong-Chinese film by Johnnie To

- Theatrical poster

Chinese name
- Traditional Chinese: 單身男女2
- Simplified Chinese: 单身男女2
Transcriptions
Standard Mandarin
- Hanyu Pinyin: Dān Shēn Nán Nǚ Er
Yue: Cantonese
- Jyutping: Daan1 San1 Naam4 Neoi2 Ji6
- Directed by: Johnnie To
- Screenplay by: Wai Ka-fai; Ryker Chan; Yu Xi
- Produced by: Johnnie To; Wai Ka-fai
- Starring: Louis Koo; Miriam Yeung; Gao Yuanyuan; Vic Chou; Daniel Wu
- Cinematography: To Hung Mo
- Edited by: David Richardson
- Music by: Hal Beckett
- Production companies: Media Asia Films; Beijing Roast Film & TV Production; Milkyway Image
- Distributed by: Media Asia Distribution
- Release dates: 8 September 2014 (TIFF); 11 November 2014 (China); 13 November 2014 (Hong Kong)
- Running time: 113 minutes
- Countries: Hong Kong; China
- Languages: Cantonese; Mandarin
- Box office: US$31.6 million

Don't Go Breaking My Heart 2 is a 2014 romantic comedy film directed by Johnnie To. A sequel to the 2011 film Don't Go Breaking My Heart, it stars returning cast members Louis Koo, Gao Yuanyuan and Daniel Wu alongside new cast members Vic Chou and Miriam Yeung. It was screened at the Special Presentations section at the 2014 Toronto International Film Festival. It was released in China on 11 November and in Hong Kong on 13 November 2014.

== Cast ==
- Louis Koo as Sean Cheung
- Miriam Yeung as Yang Yang Yang
- Gao Yuanyuan as Cheng Zixin
- Vic Chou as Paul Cheng
- Daniel Wu as Fang Qihong
- Lam Suet as John
- Lo Hoi-pang as Security guard
- Liu Yuhong as Zixin's grandmother
- Yan Jingyao as Zixin's mother
- Wang Zhihua as Qihong's father
- Du Yachun as Qihong's mother

== Production ==
Don't Go Breaking My Heart 2 was written by Wai Ka-fai and Ryker Chan and Yu Xi. Yu Xi had previously joined To’s on his films Blind Detective and Drug War as a screenwriter.

== Release ==
Don't Go Breaking My Heart 2 was shown at the Toronto International Film Festival on 9 September 2014. The film was released on 11 November 2014 in China, which is Singles Day. The film earned RMB42.1 million (US$6.88 million) from approximately 1.32 million admissions on 11 November making it the best opening gross for a film directed by Johnnie To in Mainland China.

== Reception ==
The Hollywood Reporter gave the film a negative review, stating that the "Chinese dreams of love, wealth and sex make this rom-com reboot look very much like a calculated piggy-bank stuffer." Slant Magazine gave the film a negative review, calling it "the worst film To has made since founding his independent studio Milkyway." Slant opined that "this sequel jumbles the stakes and loses its drive, not least because, while Shen-ren still pines for Zixin, Qihong toils away on the mainland completely divorced from the story."

Variety gave the film a mixed review, comparing the film to the first, stating that "much like the first time, the results are as cheerfully silly as they are compulsively watchable, despite the somewhat disappointing decision to keep one of the series’ most appealing stars (Daniel Wu) sidelined on the mainland for much of the running time." and that director Johnnie To " undisputed master of the modern Hong Kong gangster drama, turns his attention to lighter fare (like this, or 2012’s sudser "Romancing in Thin Air"), it’s like watching a great baseball pitcher warming up in the bullpen: perfect form and follow-through minus any real sizzle."
