= Fiona Sit =

Hong Kong singer and actress (born 1981)

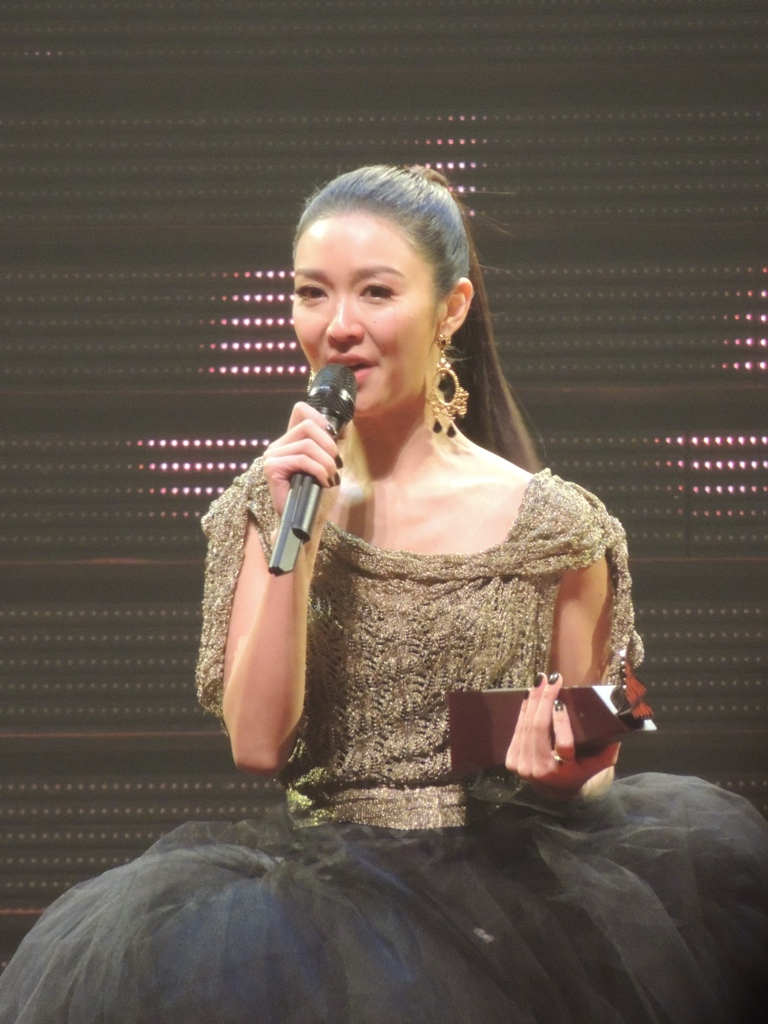
- Sit in 2013
- Born: 11 August 1981 (age 45); British Hong Kong
- Occupations: Singer; actress
- Years active: 2003–present

Chinese name
- Traditional Chinese: 薛凱琪
- Simplified Chinese: 薛凯琪
Transcriptions
Standard Mandarin
- Hanyu Pinyin: Xuē Kǎiqí
Yue: Cantonese
- Yale Romanization: Sit Hóikèih
- Jyutping: Sit3 Hoi2kei4
- Musical career
- Genre: Cantopop
- Labels: Warner Music (2003–2012) Sun Entertainment Culture (2012–2017) Warner Music (2020-present)

Fiona Sit (Chinese: 薛凱琪; born 11 August 1981) is a Hong Kong singer and actress.

== Early life ==
In an interview with Hong Kong newspaper Apple Daily in 2006, Sit revealed that she has always been interested in singing in front of an audience since a very young age, but growing up as the only child in the family left her with little opportunity to sing in front of people of her own age. So she enjoyed visiting her relatives' homes during her childhood in order to perform in front of her cousins and relatives.

She attended Island School and studied Creative Media in City University of Hong Kong until 2004. She used to be a part-time model, posing for adverts and magazines.

Her opportunity to sign a deal with Warner Music came through her uncle, Peter Wong, a senior manager at Capital Artists.

== Career ==
=== Music ===
After joining Warner Music Group in 2003, Sit first plugged her debut song "XBF" and "Madonna's Kiss", catching attention from audiences. Sit released her first album F Debut on 8 April 2004. It became a best-seller in Hong Kong, being certified gold for sales in excess of 25,000 copies. The album contained the hit ballad "XBF" (short for ex-boyfriend) and another hit, "A Letter From Keanu Reeves" (奇洛李維斯回信). "A Letter From Keanu Reeves" reached No. 1 in the charts of the four TV and radio stations and won the Top 10 Gold Song Award at the 2004 RTHK Top 10 Gold Songs Awards.

She published her debut photobook F-Trip which sold with her limited set of "Fileee Doll", and was later sold it in Animation-Comic-Game Hong Kong. It was sold out in just four days.

Due to the success of F Debut, Warner Music Hong Kong released F Debut AVCD on 5 May 2004. F Debut AVCD included her famous song "A Letter From Keanu Reeves" and another version which featured Aaron Kwok as Mr. K singing his reply to Miss F.

As she became more well known in the entertainment industry, she shot many adverts in the year, such as Toshiba and Sagem.

At the age of 23, she won most newcomer awards in the year-end ceremony from Hong Kong Music Platforms. In the Ultimate Song Chart Awards Presentation, she triumphed over other artists to win No. 7 with the song "A Letter From Keanu Reeves" and became the first newcomer who achieved the top 10 song in 903 Music Platform. She won a number of awards, including gold award for best female newcomer at the Hong Kong Music Awards, as well as a gold award for the song "Keanu Reeves' Reply." She was also awarded the Best Selling Newcomer by IFPI.

On 7 January 2005, Warner Music released a single named "886". It included songs such as "Pumpkin Wagon" and "886", which is an abbreviation of "Byebye" in Cantonese ICQ language. The single was a huge success and it was sold out within 3 weeks.

Warner Music released her second album Funny Girl on 21 April 2005. Songs "Blackie and Me" and "A Boy Just Like You" reached No. 1 on the charts of 903, RTHK and TVB's Jade Solid Gold programme. Funny Girl was one of the top 5 best selling albums in the year and was certified gold. Its success resulted in the release of Funny Girl (2nd Edition), which included a DVD of her music videos, including the No. 1 single "A Boy Like You".

Her third album, Me, was another CD+DVD combination released on 23 December 2005. It included No. 1 songs "There is a Bird" and "Finding Unicorn", and the song "Love", which was featured in the film Embrace Your Shadow, which Sit starred in. The DVD was a live concert footage of her debut concert "903 Fiona 0811", held in HITEC on 29 December 2005.

In the year-end ceremony, not only did she win a number of awards, she was also shortlisted as one of the best five female singers in 903 Music Platform and TVB's JSG Music Platform together with Kelly Chen, Joey Yung, Miriam Yeung and Denise Ho.

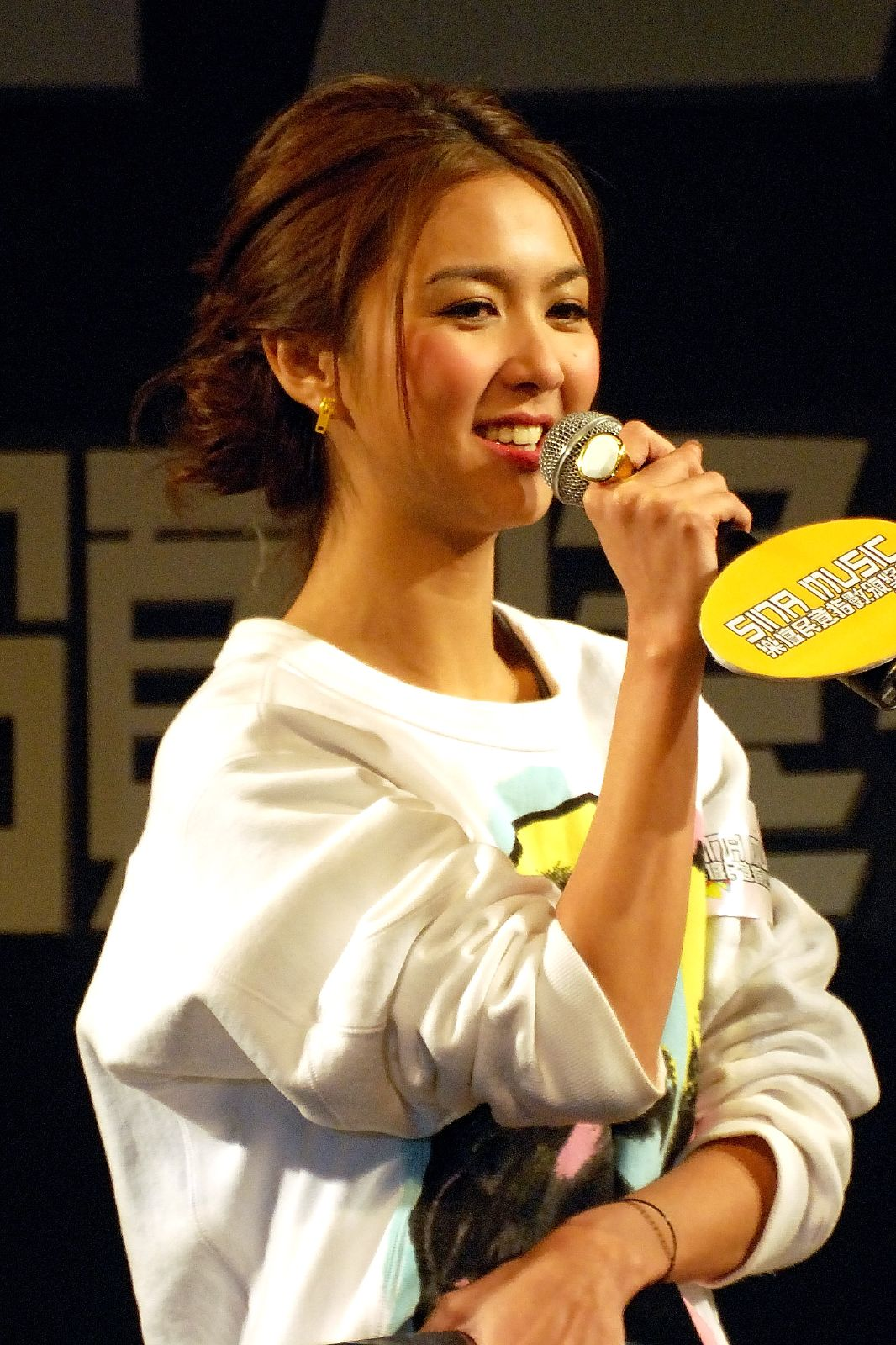
Sit at SINA Music 樂壇民意指數頒獎禮 in 2006

Sit's official fan club, Club F was established on 11 August 2006 in conjunction with her 25th birthday. Her 4th album Electric Angel was released on the same day as well. 200 fans attended the first gathering, which was held in a Chinese restaurant in Wan Chai. The second edition was later released on 22 December 2006. It included 11 songs and some extra materials.

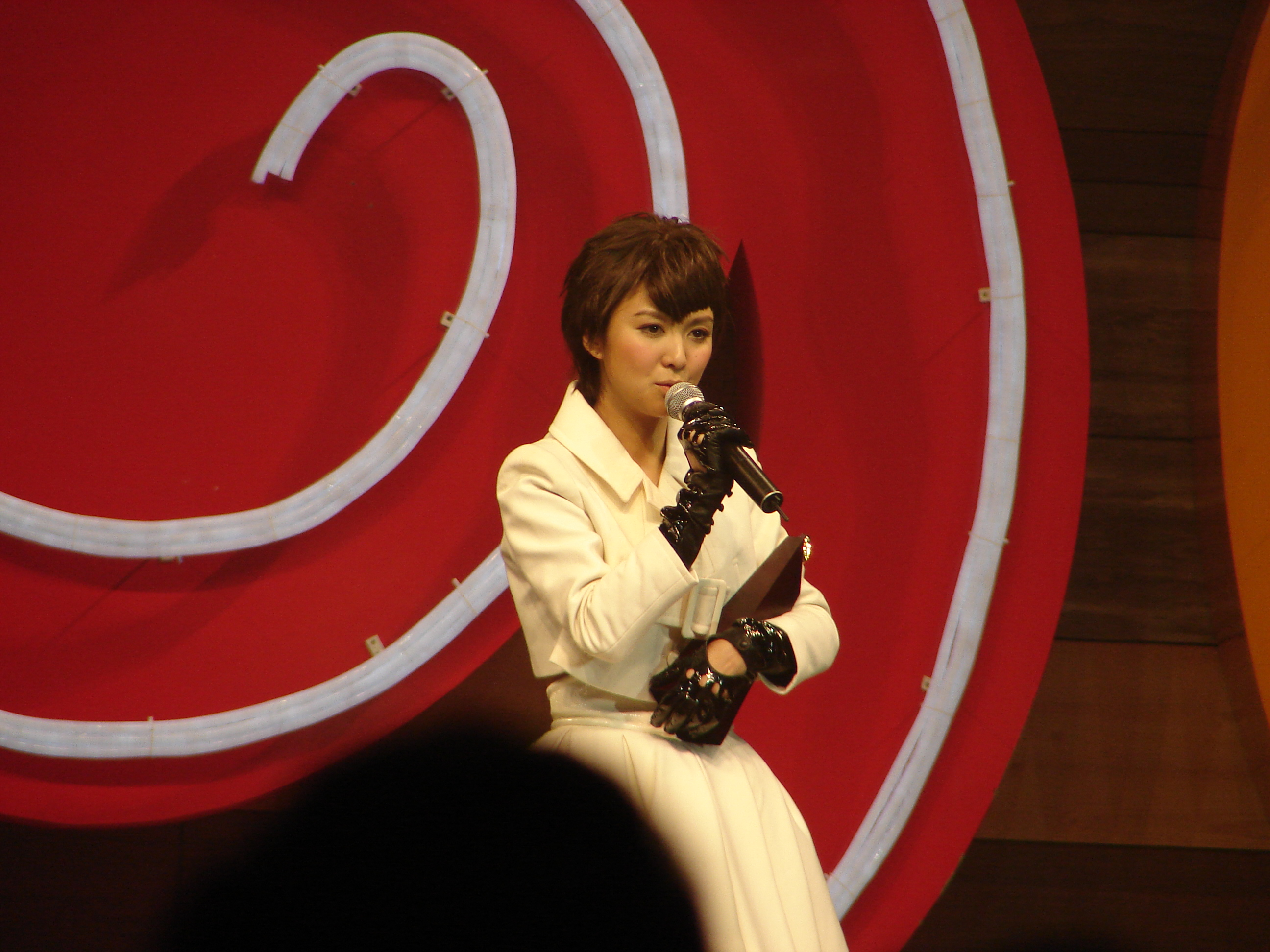
Sit at 叱咤903 in 2007

After Electric Angel, Sit went to Taiwan in order to improve her Mandarin skills. In order to keep her fanbase (Hong Kong artists usually release one to two albums per year to keep up their popularity), Warner released her first compilation, "F" Best, on 12 June 2007. The album included 3 new songs with 15 selected songs from her previous albums. The album also includes a DVD containing a short film and some MVs of her songs. In addition, a special edition of "F" Best was sold out in one month.

After training in Taiwan for one year, Sit made her debut Mandarin album It's My Day which was released on 18 April 2008. The album was recorded in Taiwan and in Singapore. It features songs such as I Don't Need Tiffany, which refers to the jewelry company and a duet with Khalil Fong, "Overcoming Memories". "It's My Day" was the first plugged song in Taiwan while "Alice's First Time" was the first plugged song in Hong Kong. This Mandarin album made Sit the best five sellers in the year in Hong Kong and became famous in Taiwan.

On 19 December 2008, Sit released another Cantopop album Smile. It included the songs in her drama Last Smile, First Tear and two No. 1 songs, "Sweet" and "The Few Seconds Without Breath".

Sit released an EP Read Me on 16 October 2009, which included four new cantopop songs and two Mandarin songs. Besides, her first plugged song "Tramcar" and third plugged song "Mu Rong Xue" reached No. 1 in two charts.

On the first day of 2010, Sit was awarded the #3 Copper Female Award in 903-year-end ceremony, for the first time.

On 18 July 2011, Sit released her new EP August Girl. It showcased a new style of Fiona Sit, with thematic song "The August Issue", two versions of "Word Flower", No. 1 song "Lip Stick", gimmick song "Before Taking Off the Straps" and two Mandarin songs. She cooperated with a team of top songwriters including Khalil Fong, Wyman Wong, Hanjin Tan, Edward Chan, and Abrahim Chan.

She then released the album Tenacious in 2013. She participated in writing two of the songs and it is her 10th anniversary album.

Sit's latest album Tonight was released in September 2014. The album has the same name as the concert she held in the same year.

=== Television series ===
Sit had a guest role in the TVB series Hearts of Fencing in 2003.

In 2005 Sit went on to film her first Hong Kong TVB series The Academy, her role was a female police trainee. To meet the job requirement of her character, Fiona cut her hair short. In contrast to her past success, fans responded negatively towards this change in her image, and were wary of her future career decisions. She followed with a cameo performance on On The First Beat. Sit also featured in a weight loss product TV commercial, in which she performed a dance routine. These two events were mocked in the Hong Kong media, and cut into her fanbase.

Despite the above, she won the Best Female newcomer in the 2006 Next TV ceremony.

In late 2006, Sit went to China and shot a drama by Derek Tung, who was 2 Young's director. Since the schedules clashed, she can only be a guest star in TVB series On The First Beat. The series was called C'est La Vie, Mon Chéri, she starred opposite Chinese actor Aloys Chen. It released after filming and was broadcast by TVB in 2008.

In 2007, she performed an internet drama hosted by Moov, with other singers like Endy Chown and Zarahn. From 2008 to 2009, she had a guest role in two TVB series Dressage To Win and ICAC Investigators 2009.

In 2010, Sit shot another Mandarin series Liao Zhai 3 and Painted Skin. From January to April 2011, she shot her second Mandarin fashionable costume series White Lies.

=== Web series ===
Sit was the main cast member of ViuTV Shadow of Justice as Inspector Gan.

=== Film ===
On 28 April 2005, Sit's debuted in the film 2 Young. The film was cast by Derek Tung, and Sit starred opposite Jaycee Chan. She received praise from the audience and many famous artistes. After a month, 2 Young made $10 million in box office and Sit became a "10-million-dollar female actress".

Owing the success of 2 Young, she filmed another movie Embrace Your Shadow, it showed in September. Joe Ma did the casting and Sit starred opposite famous Taiwanese actor Dylan Kuo. It was a challenge for Sit because the character was the complete opposite of her role in 2 Young.

In 2006, Sit was nominated in Hong Kong Hong Kong Film Awards and Taiwan Golden Horse Awards for "Best Newcomer Award" for her role in 2 Young. Although she lost to Jay Chou, her acting was praised by a number of entertainers. She also got other nominations of "Best Newcomer" and "Best Actress" hosted by a different group for 2 Young. Later, she filmed another movie Love Undercover 3 directed by Joe Ma, which showed in June and earning a lot in the box office.

In 2007, she was the emcee for the Asian Film Awards. She later filmed Wonder Women directed by Barbara Wong and collaborated with Gigi Leung. In 2009, Sit filmed two films La Comédie humaine and Break Up Club. Sit was a girl named Flora in Break Up Club and starred opposite with Jaycee Chan again, she was another girl named Skylove in La Comédie humaine and starred opposite with Wong Cho-lam.

In the year of 2010, Break Up Club showed in June and La Comédie humaine showed in July. Among the two, Break Up Club achieved $10 million box office and Sit gained a great success from her performance in Break Up Club as she won the Best Actress in Vietnam's film festival. Later, with her stand out performance, she won other film awards in Hong Kong, namely the Best Actress hosted by Mingpao, Yahoo!, and Hong Kong Performing Artistes Guild. Sit was also gained a nomination for Best Actress from Hong Kong Film Awards in 2011.

Due to her success in the movie industry, she filmed more movies which showed in 2011, such as The Way We Were and The Fortune Buddies.

With the success of Girls in 2014, Fiona starred in the second installment of the movie directed once again by Barbara Wong, Girls 2 scheduled to premier in August 2017.

== Discography ==
- F Debut (2004)
- Funny Girl (2005)
- Me (2005)
- Electric Angel (2006)
- "F" Best (New + Best Selection) (2007)
- It's My Day (2008)
- Smile (2008)
- Read Me (2009)
- August Girl (2011)
- Filicious (2012)
- The First Ten Years Collection' (Best Selection) (2012)
- Fiona Music Book EP (2013)
- Tenacious (2013)
- Tonight (2014)
- You Make Me Feel (2017)
- Dream of Love (2022)

== MV direction ==
- "Peace" (2014)
- "復原 / Fùyuán" (2014)
- "小小癡纏 / Xiǎo xiǎo chī chán" (2014)
- "最後最後 / Zuìhòu zuìhòu" (2014)
- "最後最後 / Zuìhòu zuìhòu / Micro Film" (2014)
- "一直一直 / Yīzhí yīzhí" (2014)
- "點水蜻蜓 / Diǎn shuǐ qīngtíng" (2015)
- "好好聽 / Hǎohǎo tīng" (2017)
- "Don't let it go" (2017)
- "南昌街王子 / The Prince Near You" (2020)

== Concerts ==
- 903 Hit Four Fiona 0811 Concert(熱火樂團) (2005)
- 903 Hit Four Concert(熱火樂團熱火四俠) (2005) (Shawn Yue, Wilfred Lau and Kary Ng)
- 903 Live Concert Fiona Sit X Stephanie Cheng (拉闊演奏廳) (2006)
- Roadshow Live Fiona Sit Concert (2007)
- 903 id club (音樂游擊) 1st section Fiona Sit X Sammy Moving (2007)
- 903 Live Concert Fiona Sit(拉闊變奏廳) 2 ng section (2008)
- Khalil Fong X Fiona Sit Awesome Concert (San Francisco & Los Angeles) (2010)
- 903 Live Concert (拉闊擂台) 2nd section Fiona Sit X Dear Jane {Dear Fi} (2010)
- Khalil Fong & Fiona Sit Live in Australia 2010 (Sydney, Adelaide & Melbourne) (2010)
- Khalil Fong & Fiona Sit Live in Australia 2010 (San Francisco & LA) (2010)
- Fiona Sit MOOV LIVE 2011 (2011)
- Filicious Fiona in Concert 2012 (2012)
- Fiona Neway Music Live (2013)
- 903id club Music is Live Eman Lam x Fiona Sit x vana Wong x Kary Ng (2013)
- Tonight Fiona Live 2014 (2014)
- COURTURiSSIMO presents : Fiona Sit music experience 2017 picnic series #01 (2017)
- Joox – Dear Jane X Fiona 《ON THE ROCKS》live (2019)
- Sammi x Fiona x Gem x Rainie 《Music Unlimited》concert (2020)

== Filmography ==
=== Film ===
Year	Title	Role	Notes
2005	2 Young	Lui Yeuk-nam	
2005	Embrace Your Shadow	Ran	
2006	My Name Is Fame	Fiona	
2006	Pandora's Booth	Szeto Sum-sum (70s)	
2006	Love Undercover 3	Fan Sai-wo	
2007	Simply Actors	Giddy Cadet 747	
2007	Wonder Women	Sung Hiu-tung	
2008	A Story of Siu Man	(Dub)	
2010	Break Up Club	Flora	
2010	La Comédie humaine	Sky Love	
2010	How to Train Your Dragon	(Dub)	
2011	The Way We Were		
2011	The Fortune Buddies	Fiona	
2012	Mr. and Mrs. Gambler	Flora Cheung	
2012	The Bounty	Suen Long-ching	
2012	Nightmare		
2012	Vulgaria	Quin	
2012	Diva	Fi	
2013	Hotel Deluxe		
2014	Hello Babies		
2014	Golden Chicken 3		
2014	Girls		
2015	12 Golden Ducks		
2015	Insanity		
2015	Guia in Love		
2016	Mr. High Heels		
2016	Let's Eat!		
2017	Two Wrongs Make a Right	He Peipei	
2018	Girls 2	Kimmy	
2018	Kung Fu Monster		
2019	A Witness Out of the Blue	Cindy Yeung	
2020	Back to earth		
2021	All U Need Is Love		

=== Drama ===
Year	Title	Role	Notes
2003	Hearts of Fencing		Guest star
2005	The Zone		Guest star
2005	The Academy	Fiona	
2007	On the First Beat	Fiona	Guest star (ep. 1–4, 29)
2007	Colours of Love		
2008	C'est La Vie, Mon Chéri	Lau Mun	
2008	Dressage To Win	Mental patient	Guest star (ep. 6)
2009	ICAC Investigators 2009	Hui Kei-san	(ep. 2 and 4)
2010	Liao Zhai 3	Bai Qiu Lian	
2011	Painted Skin	Xiaowei / Xuxu	
2011	White Lies		
2018	Shadow of Justice	簡文珊 / Inspector Gan	
2020	Useless Her	許薄文	

=== Variety show ===
==== 2020 ====
• 花花萬物 Huāhuā wànwù

• 新聲請指教 Xīn sheng qǐng zhǐ jiào

==== 2019 ====
• The Big Band

• Sing Cantonese

==== 2018 ====
• The Perfect Restaurant

• Do Re Mi

• Mask Singer Season 3

== Editorial ==
=== 2020 ===
- Cle de peau Le Sérum x UNICEF Hong Kong Charity Campaign

=== 2019–2015 ===
- OLAY 1+1 Collagen
- OLAY Sunblock & Whitening essence
- OLAY Air Cream
- OLAY Youth Project (Sunblock)
- DIOR 999 Ultra ROUGE
- DIOR Addict Lip Glow
- YAZ The Most Prescribed Ultra-low Dose Pill 2018 Endorser
- MAC x Fiona Versicolour-varnish Promotion Video in Hong Kong
- Tom Ford Beauty – The Eyes of Tom Ford
- YAZ The Most Prescribed Ultra-low Dose Pill 2017 Endorser
- ELLE TV – MCM x Fiona Sit FASHION DAY & NIGHT
- Fresh x Fiona Sit Fresh Moments
- Dermes 2017 Endorser
- Dermes 2016 Endorser
- Dermes 2015 Endorser
- Collagen By Watsons Endorser (China)

=== 2014–2008 ===
- Adidas women – sport performance 2014 Endorser
- Lancôme HYPNOSE
- La Gusto Coffee Endorser
- Adidas women – sport performance TVC
- Adidas women – sport performance 2013 Endorser
- VICTORINOX Go Pink
- Dermes 2014 Endorser
- STACCATO
- Giordano
- Wyeth Nutrition (Ad song)
- PUMA
- Levi's Indigo Endorser
- Catalog
- Monalisa Bridal Salon Endorser
- L’oreal Gernier Skin care products
- Netvigator
- Levi's Luxury

=== 2007–2001 ===
- Japan Rabbit Annasalbe Ace Cream Endorser
- PCCW
- Netvigator
- 3C Digital Chain Store
- Nin Jiom Pei Pa Koa
- Toshiba Notebook
- La Vallee Skin care products
- AMO Blink Complete Moisture Plus
- SAGEM Mobile Phone
- VITA fruit tea
- YOHO Town
- Coca-Cola
- Nestlé Yoghurt
- AIWA MD
- Motorola
- Bank of China Y’N Credit Card
- HSBC
- VITA

== Awards ==
=== 2016 ===
- Weibo Star Award – Choral Award <結>
- Weibo Star Award – Top Ten Hong Kong Entertainment Celebrities (Eighth)
- Top Ten Chinese Gold Songs Award Concert – Outstanding Pop Singer Award
- 《音樂先鋒榜》- Hong Kong and Taiwan Top Ten Songs <After 10 Years>
- 《音樂先鋒榜》- Top 5 most popular singers (female singers)
- 《音樂先鋒榜》- The most popular singer in Hong Kong and Taiwan (female singer)

=== 2015 ===
- Livetube MVA – The second quarter after quarter election group winning MV
- Ultimate Song Chart Awards Presentation – Professional recommendation "Top Ten" No. 5

=== 2014 ===
- The 37th Top Ten Chinese Gold Songs Award Concert – Top Ten song <宮若梅>
- Ultimate Song Chart Awards Presentation – Best Female Singer (Bronze Award)
- Hit Awards – Best songs <Last Dance>
- The 14th Global Chinese Music Awards – Top 20 Songs <弗洛蒙>
- The 14th Global Chinese Music Awards – Best Album <Tonight>
- The 14th Global Chinese Music Awards – Top five most popular female singers
- The 14th Global Chinese Music Awards – Best female singer
- 《音樂先鋒榜》- Top five most popular female singers of the year
- 《音樂先鋒榜》- Best Female Singer (Hong Kong and Taiwan) jointly awarded by 24 radio stations of the year
- 《音樂先鋒榜》- Top Ten Songs in Hong Kong and Taiwan of the Year <Last Dance>
- Cosmopolitan Fun Fearless Awards – Fun Fearless Award
- Yahoo! Buzz Award – Popular songs <Last Dance>
- 第十屆勁歌王金曲金榜年度音樂盛典 – Best Female singer (Hong Kong)
- 第十屆勁歌王金曲金榜年度音樂盛典 – Best Cantonese Song <Last Dance>
- 第十屆勁歌王金曲金榜年度音樂盛典 – Media Awards

=== 2013 ===
- Weibo Star Awards – Top Ten Influence Celebrities in Weibo
- Jade Solid Gold Best Ten Music Awards Presentation – Song <告別我>
- The 1st V Chart Awards – Hong Kong and Taiwan Female Artist of the Year
- The 1st V Chart Awards – Best MV <Better Me>
- Hit Awards – Metro Asian Singer Awards
- Hit Awards – Metro Best Song <諸葛亮>
- Ultimate Song Chart Awards Presentation – Best Female Singer (Silver Award)

=== 2012 ===
- The 12th Global Chinese Music Awards – Area Outstanding Artist Award
- 第九屆勁歌王全球華人樂壇音樂盛典 – Best Cantonese Song <冷笑話>
- 第九屆勁歌王全球華人樂壇音樂盛典 – Outstanding Performance Award
- 第九屆勁歌王全球華人樂壇音樂盛典 – Favorite Singer Award
- Top Ten Chinese Gold Songs Award Concert – Best Progress Award of the Year (Silver Award)
- SINA Music Awards – Popular Singer Award
- Hit Awards – Metro Asian Singer Awards
- Hit Awards – Metro Best Song <冷笑話>
- Hit Awards – Metro Karaoke song "All You Need Is Me"

=== 2011 ===
- Hit Awards – Best Female Singer
- Hit Awards – Metro Best Song <除下吊帶前>

=== 2010 ===
- Vietnam International Film Festival Best Actress Award for "Break Up Club"
- Ultimate Song Chart Awards Presentation – Best Female Singer (Bronze Award)
- Hit Awards – Metro Best Song <除下吊帶前>
- Chinese Radio USA, Inc. Awards – Female Singer of the Year (Silver Award)
- SINA Music Awards – Advertising Song Awards <惠氏金裝膳兒加>
- Yahoo! Buzz Award – Top Ten Popular Songs <字花>
- Yahoo! Buzz Award – Top Ten Popular Actresses
- Mingpao Weekly Awards – Best Female Actress
- Hong Kong Performing Artistes Guild Awards – Outstanding Film Actress Award

=== 2009 ===
- Yahoo! Buzz Award – Top Ten Popular Songs <慕容雪>
- Hit Awards – Metro Original Songs <Tram>
- Hit Awards – Metro Best Songs <甜蜜蜜>
- Hit Awards – Metro Karaoke song <甜蜜蜜>
- SINA Music Awards – Top 20 songs with highest listening rate <Tram>
- SINA Music Awards – Highest Rating MV Award <慕容雪>
- Ultimate Song Chart Awards Presentation – Best Female Singer (Bronze Award)
- 雪碧中國原創音樂流行榜 – Most potential singer (Hong Kong)
- 雪碧中國原創音樂流行榜 – Hong Kong and Taiwan Best Song Award <蘇州河>

=== 2008 ===
- Metro Radio Mandarin Hits Music Awards Presentation – Metro Leap singer
- Metro Radio Mandarin Hits Music Awards Presentation – Mandarin Songs <愛麗絲的第一次>
- SINA Music Awards – Top 20 songs with highest listening rate <天國的微笑>
- SINA Music Awards – Highest Rating Award <It's my day>
- 第五屆勁歌王金曲金榜年度音樂盛典 – Entertainer award
- 第五屆勁歌王金曲金榜年度音樂盛典 – Internet Popular Female Singer Award
- 第五屆勁歌王金曲金榜年度音樂盛典 – Mandarin Songs <愛麗絲的第一次>
- Global Chinese Music Awards – The most popular duet song <復刻回憶>
- 雪碧中國原創音樂流行榜 – Leap Performance Award (Hong Kong)
- Hit Awards – Metro Best Songs <天國的微笑>
- Hit Awards – Metro Original Songs <天國的微笑>

=== 2007 ===
- TVB " Jade Solid Gold" Best Choice Award, second round – Next Time
- Jade Solid Gold Best Ten Music Awards Presentation – Most Popular Chinese Song Award <四人遊> (Bronze Award)
- RoadShow至尊音樂頒獎禮 – Choral Award <四人遊>
- 第四屆勁歌王年度總選頒奬典禮 – Entertainer award
- 第四屆勁歌王年度總選頒奬典禮 – Song Award (Cantonese) <Little Canyon 1234>
- 第四屆勁歌王年度總選頒奬典禮 – The most popular duet song <四人遊>
- The 1st Spectrum Radio Golden Rainbow Award – Favorite movie actress

=== 2006 ===
(Hong Kong)

- Hong Kong Top Sales Music Award – Top 10 best-selling local singers
- 四台聯頒音樂大獎 – Outstanding Performance Award (Bronze Award)
- Commercial Radio – " Supreme Song " – The Seventh: Little Canyon 1234
- Hit Awards – Metro Best Songs <Tong But Lut>
- TVB " Jade Solid Gold" Best Choice Award, second round- Tong But Lut
- TVB "Jade Solid Gold" First round golden song – Finding Unicorn
- Next Media Television Award- New Artiste
- Next Media Television Award- Most Charming New Star
- SINA Music Awards – New song audition highest listening rate song #7 <Little Canyon 1234>
- SINA Music Awards – Highest Rating MV Award <Tong But Lut>
- Jade Solid Gold Best Ten Music Awards Presentation 1st round – Top Ten songs <尋找獨角獸>
- RoadShow至尊音樂頒獎禮 – Best Songs <Tong But Lut>
- RoadShow至尊音樂頒獎禮 – Most Popular Singer
- Yahoo! Most popular artist's Blog Award

(Mainland China)

- Guangzhou radio "Gold Song, Gold Chart" Most Famous Female Artist
- Guangzhou Radio "Golden Chart Award" All-round Artist (outside mainland china region)
- Guangzhou Radio "Golden Chart Award" Most Famous Female Artist (outside mainland china region)
- Guangzhou Radio "Golden Chart Award" Golden songs – Tong But Lut
- 雪碧中國原創音樂流行榜 – Favorite Popular Idol Award (Hong Kong)
- 雪碧中國原創音樂流行榜 – Favorite Popular Idol Award (Hong Kong and Taiwan)
- 《音樂先鋒榜》- Most Popular Female Singer Award

=== 2005 ===
(Hong Kong)

- Roadshow Popular Singer
- Roadshow Hit Song – Little Dark and Me
- Commercial Radio – " Supreme Song " – The Fifth: Little Dark and Me
- TVB "Jade Solid Gold" – " Top Ten Gold Songs Award " – Boy Likes You
- Metro Radio " Entertainment Television Award " – Super TV New Actress
- Outstanding Website Award – Activities Promotion Ambassador
- TVB "Jade Solid Gold" First round golden song – Little Dark and Me
- Metro Hit Radio "Karaoke Hit Song" – Little Dark and Me
- Metro Hit Radio – Popular Singer
- Metro Hit Radio "Awards from 4 Stations" – Remarkable Performance – Gold Award

(Mainland China)

- 9 + 2 Music Pioneer Award New Female Singer Gold Award
- Sprite China Original Music Chart " My Favourite Idol Award (Hong Kong) "
- Sprite China Original Music Chart " Great Advancement Singer Award "
- The third session of Southeast Power Music Award – Most promising future female singer in Hong Kong Region
- Yue-Gang Future Super Star Award – Future Super Star

=== 2004 ===
(Hong Kong)

- Metro Hit Radio "New Female Artiste"
- Metro Hit Radio "My Favorite New Female Artiste"
- Metro Hit Radio Original Music Award – Reply from Keanu Reeves
- TVB "Jade Solid Gold"– "Most Favorite New Artiste"– Gold Award
- Metro Hit Radio Best Lyric – Reply from Keanu Reeves
- Commercial Radio "New Female Artiste"– Gold Award
- Commercial Radio "The Excellent Performance Award presented by four Media Organizers" Bronze Award.
- Commercial Radio – "Supreme Song"– The Seventh: Reply from Keanu Reeves
- RTHK Top Ten Chinese Gold Songs Award "Ten Best Song" – Reply from Keanu Reeves
- RTHK "Top Ten Chinese Gold Songs Award " New Female Artiste– Gold Award
- Yahoo! Music Chart Top Ten Songs – Reply from Keanu Reeves
- Yahoo! Potential Newcomers
- IFPI The Best Sales Artist, Newcomer, Female
- Road Show MV Direct Voting: Best new artist
- PM Magazine – Cross inter-media female artist
- TVB Golden Kid Songs Award "Top 10 Kid Songs" – Ugly Ducking Swam Lake
- TVB "Jade Solid Gold " First round golden song – Reply from Keanu Reeves
- TVB "Jade Solid Gold " First round new singer – Top new singer in three consecutive weeks
- TVB "Jade Solid Gold " Second round golden song – 886

(Mainland China)

- Guangzhou Radio "Golden Chart Award" – Queen of New Female Singer
- Guangzhou Radio "Golden Chart Award" Golden Song – Reply from Keanu Reeves
- Guangdong Radio Music Pioneer Award "Most Famous New Female Singer" – Gold Award
- Southern City Daily Newspaper and Radio Guangdong "the 5th Year Chinese Music Media Award" – The Best New Artist
- Guangzhou "the 2nd Year Music King Final Award – Most Promising New Artist
- Guangzhou "the 2nd Year Music King Final Award" Golden Song – Reply from Keanu Reeves
