= August Girl =

Studio album by Fiona Sit
- Released: July 8, 2011
- Genre: Cantopop
- Producer: Warner Music Hong Kong

Fiona Sit chronology
| Read Me (2009) | August Girl (2011) |

August Girl is the eighth album by Fiona Sit, and was released on July 8, 2011.

It was released two years after the previous album, Read Me. The album includes contributions from Hanjin Tan, Khalil Fong, Wyman Wong, Edward Chan, and Abrahim Chan. The album also contains two Mandarin songs, including the theme song from TV drama Painted Skin, "Only Love", in a duet with Hinson Chou.

== Track listing ==
1. 八月號 (The August Issue)
2. 字花 Sunset Version (Word Flower - Sunset Version)
3. 除下吊帶前 (Before Taking off the Straps)
4. 唇印 (Lip Stick)
5. 字花 Sunrise Version (Word Flower - Sunrise Version)
6. 不要愛我 (Don't Love Me) [Mandarin Version of 除下吊帶前 (Before Taking off the Straps)]
7. 唯愛 (國) (Only Love) [Theme Song of Drama "Painted Skin"]
