= Kan Jong-woo =

South Korean singer and songwriter (born 1982)

- Born: April 11, 1982 (age 43); South Korea
- Genres: K-pop
- Occupations: Singer; songwriter
- Years active: 2009–present

Kan Jong-woo (Korean: 간종우; born April 11, 1982) is a South Korean singer and songwriter. He is a twin brother of singer Kan Jong-wook. They have formed a K-pop vocal duo called J2 (Korean: 제이투) in 2010. Their first single "Missing" was used as the title track for movie Man of Vendetta. Kan has written over 60 lyrics including major South Korean national TV shows' OSTs like Apgujeong Midnight Sun, Royal Family, Princess Aurora, Pink Lipstick, Bravo, My Love!, and Gloria.

== Personal life ==
Kan graduated from Pratt Institute, both undergraduate and graduate school, and has BFA in Interior Design and Masters in communication design. He currently lives in New York City working as a designer.
