= Pink Lipstick =

- Promotional poster
- Genre: Melodrama Revenge; Romance
- Written by: Seo Hyun-joo
- Directed by: Choi Chang-wook
- Starring: Park Eun-hye; Lee Joo-hyun; Park Gwang-hyun; Seo Yoo-jung
- Music by: Choi Wan-hee (Praha)
- Ending theme: "Deep Breath" by Kan Jong-wook Lyrics by Kan Jong-woo
- Country of origin: South Korea
- Original language: Korean
- No. of episodes: 149

Production
- Producers: Choi Yong-won; Kim Jung ho
- Running time: 30 minutes
- Production company: MBC C&I

Original release
- Network: MBC TV
- Release: January 11 – August 6, 2010

Pink Lipstick (Korean: 분홍 립스틱; RR: Bunhong ripseutik) is a 2010 South Korean television drama starring Park Eun-hye, Lee Joo-hyun, Park Gwang-hyun and Seo Yoo-jung. It aired on MBC from January 11 to August 6, 2010, on Mondays to Fridays at 7:50 a.m. for 149 episodes.

== Synopsis ==
Yoo Ga-eun is a sweet-natured girl who married her college sweetheart, Park Jung-woo. However, she later discovers that her husband had an affair with her best friend, Kim Mi-ran, and that their adopted daughter Na-ri is actually Jung-woo and Mi-ran's lovechild. After she and Jung-woo divorce, Ga-eun meets Ha Jae-bum, and they fall deeply in love. But when she learns that Jung-woo plotted her father's downfall, causing her brother Sung-eun to die in prison, Ga-eun sets aside love to wreak her revenge against Jung-woo and Mi-ran. She starts by getting engaged to Maeng Ho-geol, a wealthy clothing retailer who is Jae-bum's uncle.

== Cast ==
Main cast

- Park Eun-hye as Yoo Ga-eun
- Lee Joo-hyun as Park Jung-woo
  - Ryu Ui-hyun as young Park Jung-woo
- Park Gwang-hyun as Ha Jae-bum
- Seo Yoo-jung as Kim Mi-ran / Julia Kim
  - Bang Joon-seo as young Mi-ran

Yoo family

- Nam Il-woo as Yoo Dong-gook, father
- Kim Young-ran as Jung Hae-shil, mother
- Moon Ji-yoon as Yoo Sung-eun, brother
- Kim Min-hwa as Yoo Young-eun, sister

Park family

- Oh Mi-yeon as Han Bun-nyeo, mother
- MayBee as Park Jung-hee, sister
- Kim Su-jung as Park Na-ri, Jung-woo and Mi-ran's daughter

Extended cast

- Dokgo Young-jae as Maeng Ho-geol, owner of Taeyang Apparel
- Sung Woong as Maeng Seo-jin, Ho-geol's son and Jae-bum's friend
- Yu Ji-in as Jung Mal-ja / Betty Jung, Mi-ran's mother
- Lee Sang-hoon as Yeo Ki-byul
- Jung Yoo-chan as Kim Young-gyu
- Baek Bo-ram as Yoon Na-na
- Lee Jung-yong as Cho Yong-kap / Mister Cho
- Song Ji-eun as Kim Min-joo, Mi-ran's friend
- Won Jong-rye as Oh Soo-ji
- Kan Jong-wook as Club Singer (cameo)
- Sung Hyuk

== Awards ==
- 2010 MBC Drama Awards: Excellence Award, Actress - Park Eun-hye

== International broadcast ==
- Iran: GEM TV (2011)
- Philippines: TV5 (2012)
- Thailand: True Asian Series (2012)
- Vietnam: VTV3 (24/05/2013)
- Indonesia: Indosiar (2014)
