= Make a Wish (Vic Chou album) =

- Make a Wish cover

Studio album by Vic Zhou
- Released: 11 January 2002
- Recorded: 2001
- Genre: Mandopop
- Language: Mandarin
- Label: Sony Music Taiwan

Vic Zhou chronology
Make a Wish (2002)	Remember, I Love You (2004)

Make a Wish is the debut Mandarin solo studio album by Taiwanese Mandopop artist Vic Chou, of boy band F4. It was released on 11 January 2002 by Sony Music Taiwan. Chou was the first of the F4 members to release a solo album. A second limited edition was released on 26 February 2002.

The track "Make a Wish" listed at number 76 on Hit FM Taiwan's Hit FM Annual Top 100 Singles Chart (Hit-Fm年度百首單曲) for 2002.

The album was awarded one of the Top 10 Selling Mandarin Albums of the Year at the 2002 IFPI Hong Kong Album Sales Awards, presented by the Hong Kong branch of IFPI.

== Track listing ==
1. "Make a Wish"
2. "愛在愛妳" Ài Zài Ài Nǐ (Love Loves You)
3. "求救專線" Qiú Jiù Zhuān Xiàn (Hotline for Help)
4. "破碎的眼淚" Pò Suì De Yǎn Lèi (Broken Tears)
5. "溫柔的晚安" Wēn Róu De Wǎn Ān (A Gentle Good Night)
6. "有我有你" Yǒu Wǒ Yǒu Nǐ (With Me and You)
7. "Loving You"
8. "心疼" Xīn Téng (It Aches My Heart)
9. "童話還不夠美好" Tóng Huà Hái Bú Gòu Měi Hǎo (Even Fairy Tales Are Not Good Enough)
10. "要不是愛上你" Yào Bú Shì Ài Shàng Nǐ (If It Were Not, for Loving You)
