= Truth or Dare: 6th Floor Rear Flat =

2003 Hong Kong film by Barbara Wong

- Film poster
- Directed by: Barbara Wong Chun-Chun
- Screenplay by: Lawrence Cheng; Fan Cheung; Wong Chun-Chun
- Story by: Lawrence Cheng
- Produced by: Lawrence Cheng; Arthur Wong
- Starring: Karena Lam; Candy Lo; Lawrence Chou; Roy Chow; Patrick Tang
- Cinematography: Arthur Wong
- Edited by: Men Lee Ming
- Music by: Ng Lok Shing
- Distributed by: Universe Films Ltd.
- Release date: 4 June 2003
- Running time: 102 minutes
- Country: Hong Kong
- Language: Cantonese

Truth or Dare: 6th Floor Rear Flat (Chinese: 六樓后座; Cantonese Yale: Luhkláu hauhjoh) is a 2003 Hong Kong film directed by Barbara Wong, starring an ensemble cast featuring Karena Lam, Candy Lo, Juno Mak, Teresa Carpio, Roy Chow, Laurence Chou, and Edwin Siu. The film was considered both a critical and commercial success, and won various awards in both the 23rd Annual Hong Kong Film Awards and the 40th Annual Golden Horse Awards.

== Synopsis ==
The plot revolves around the party-loving residents of the Rear Flat and a drunken deal made in a game of Truth or Dare with the elderly flat owner lady, Suzy; the deal required all the residents to make a wish and make it happen within a year, and whoever fails had to face the consequence of eating Suzy's fecal matter. What started as a joke turned into a seemingly serious matter as the youngsters thrived for their ambition with gusto.

== Sequel ==
Wong directed a 2008 Sequel to the film, 6th Floor Rear Flat: Happy Funeral (Chinese: 六樓后座2: 家屬謝禮), starring a new generation of youngsters who take over the Rear Flat after previous residents presumably move out. The ensemble cast includes several Hong Kong hip hop and pop sensations, featuring Elanne Kong, Tian Yuan, and band members of I Love You Boyz and FAMA, as well as veteran Hong Kong actors Eric Tsang and Patrick Dunn. In the sequel, characters make references to the previous residents, and the film also sees cameos from four of the previous residents of the flat, having all returned to visit Suzy after their various successes.

The film follows a basic premise of 6 friends whom have just moved into a flat in Hong Kong. They play a round of truth or dare and are dared to do something with their lives. They will have to complete the task in one year or else be forced to eat the waste products of Suzy, the owner of the flat.

== Cast and roles ==
- Karena Lam - Karena
- Candy Lo - Candy
- Roy Chow - Leo
- Lawrence Chou - Wing
- Patrick Tang - Jean
- William So - Officer Hong
- Teresa Carpio - Wing's mother
- Law Koon-Lan - Miss Kim
- Lawrence Cheng - Jason (voice only)
- Angela Au
- Wong Chun-chun - Amy (cameo)
- Clarence Hui - Paco
- Sammy Leung - Bo
- Edwin Siu - Edwin
- Courtney Wu - Auction guest
