= Detective Gui =

2015 Chinese-Hong Kong-Taiwanese film by Oxide Pang

- Poster
- 宅女侦探桂香
- Directed by: Oxide Pang
- Written by: Wu Zhenxiang
- Produced by: Grace Song; Karen Fu; Aileen Li; Mou Fengjing; Yang Rong; Wu Zhenxiang; Wei Xie; Ye Li; Zhang Jie
- Starring: Wang Luodan; Vic Chou; Simon Yam; Paw Hee-ching; Tien Hsin; Shek Sau; Maggie Shiu
- Cinematography: Chen Togo
- Edited by: Curran Pang
- Music by: Payont Permsith
- Distributed by: Heng Ye Film Distribution; Acutance Pictures Corp. of China
- Release date: 13 August 2015 (China)
- Running time: 98 minutes
- Countries: China; Hong Kong; Taiwan
- Language: Mandarin
- Box office: CN¥41.4 million

Detective Gui (Chinese: 宅女侦探桂香) is a 2015 suspense romantic comedy film directed by Oxide Pang. A China-Hong Kong-Taiwan co-production, the film was released in China on 13 August 2015.

== Cast ==
- Wang Luodan
- Vic Chou
- Simon Yam
- Paw Hee-ching
- Tien Hsin
- Shek Sau
- Maggie Shiu

== Reception ==
=== Box office ===
The film earned CN¥41.363 million at the Chinese box office.
