= C'est La Vie, Mon Chéri =

2008 Hong Kong TV series

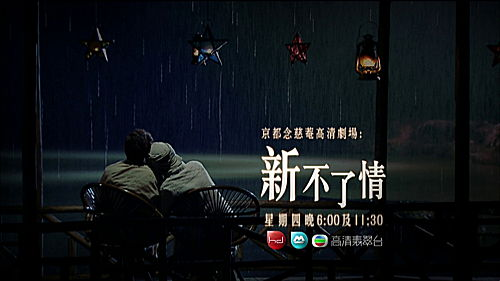
- 新不了情
- Genre: Drama; Romance
- Written by: Ella Chan
- Directed by: Derek Yee
- Starring: Fiona Sit; Aloys Chen; Alex Fong; Candice Yu; Benz Hui
- Opening theme: 新不了情 by Jane Zhang
- Ending theme: 我要如何不想他 by Tsai Chin
- Countries of origin: Hong Kong; China
- Original languages: Cantonese; Mandarin
- No. of episodes: 29

Production
- Producers: Derek Yee; Henry Fong
- Production locations: Hong Kong; Guangzhou, China
- Running time: 45 mins
- Production company: Film Unlimited

Original release
- Network: Jade
- Release: 13 March – 22 April 2008

C'est La Vie, Mon Chéri or New Endless Love (Chinese: 新不了情) is a 2008 series starring Fiona Sit and Aloys Chen based on an adaptation of the 1993 Hong Kong movie, also known as C'est la vie, mon chéri. Both the movie and the series are directed by Derek Yee.

== Synopsis ==
The story starts out with Kit and Mun being complete strangers. Kit breaks up with superstar Tracy after being with her for 5 years and moves out to live in a place called Yau Ma Tei. Kit becomes good friends with a neighbouring family (Mun's family) who sing every night in Temple Street for a living. As Tracy becomes more hateful of Kit and Mun, Kit and Mun develop a closer relationship every day unnoticed. With the audience having to wait impatiently for the two to get together, Kit makes a swift move at the end of episode 15 and kisses Mun on the lips for the first time.

Together, the couple go through a series of downfalls like Tracy stealing a song Kit wrote for Mun, Mun seeing her divorced father again, Ling leaving the family, and Kit rebonding with his mother. Just when Mun and Kit are closer than ever, fate turns against them. In episode 23, the two talk about marriage and right after a phone call where Mun told Kit not to buy an expensive wedding ring, Mun falls on the ground foreshadowing bone tumor will return to haunt her. Mun, once the strongest character in the story, loses her cheerfulness and optimism.

== Cast ==
Lau family

Cast	Role	Description
Alex Fong	Lau Ho Wan 劉浩雲	Mun's father Lum's father Fan's husband Oi's ex-boyfriend Successful businessman
Candice Yu	Lee Joi Oi 李再愛	Mun's mother Kei Gor's girlfriend Wen's ex-girlfriend Singer
Chen Xiaoyi 陳小藝	Hui Pui Fan 許佩芬	Wen's wife Lum's mother
Fiona Sit	Lau Mun 劉敏	Kit's girlfriend Oi's daughter Wen's daughter Singer
Benz Hui	Lee Joi Sang 李再生	Mun's uncle Oi's brother Saxophone player
Lü Jie	Man Siu Ling 萬少玲	Oi's non-biological sister Singer; Chinese opera performer

Cheung family

Cast	Role	Description
Ken Wong 王凱韋	Cheung Siu Wa 張少華	Kit's brother
Aloys Chen	Cheung Siu Kit 張少傑	Mun's boyfriend Tracy's ex-boyfriend Music & lyrics composer
Zhao Rong 趙榮	Pang Tsui Sai 彭翠茜	Kit's ex-girlfriend Singer; Superstar
Elena Kong	Ma Man Lai 馬文麗	Tracy's manager

== Background Information ==
=== Mun ===
The birth of Mun initially caused multiple problems for Oi. Right when Oi found she was pregnant, her spouse Wen announced his family has arranged for him to marry Fan. Realising she was not capable of raising Mun alone, Oi decided to let Wen and Fan take care of her. At the age of five, Mun was diagnosed with bone tumor. Chances of her surviving were critically low and Fan who was at that time pregnant, abandoned Mun. Giving up her career in the professional singing industry, Oi rebonded with Mun who miraculously recovered.

=== Kit ===
Kit grew up without a proper father and mother. His mother left the family to be with another man and being frustrated at that time, told Kit's father he is not Kit's real dad. Due to this reason, Kit was treated much harsher compared to his closest family member and brother, Wa. A DNA test later proved that Kit was in fact Wa's biological brother. Later Started a music school using his talents to compose and teach.

== Theme song ==
For the TV series, the theme song of the same name C'est la vie, mon chéri (Chinese: 新不了情; pinyin: Xīn bùliǎo qíng) is sung by Jane Zhang, while for the 1993 film it was sung by Taiwanese singer One-Fang.
