= Remember, I Love You =

- Remember, I Love You cover

Studio album 記得我愛你 by Vic Zhou
- Released: 2 January 2004
- Recorded: 2003
- Genre: Mandopop
- Language: Mandarin
- Label: Sony Music Taiwan

Vic Zhou chronology
Make a Wish (2002)	Remember, I Love You (2004)	I'm Not F4 (2007)

Remember, I Love You (Chinese: 記得我愛你; pinyin: Jì Dé Wǒ Ài Nǐ) is Taiwanese Mandopop artist Vic Chou's, of boy band F4, second Mandarin studio album. It was released on 2 January 2004 by Sony Music Taiwan. A second limited edition was released on 10 February 2004

The album was awarded one of the Top 10 Selling Mandarin Albums of the Year at the 2004 IFPI Hong Kong Album Sales Awards, presented by the Hong Kong branch of IFPI.

== Track listing ==
1. Remember, I Love You - 記得我愛你 (pinyin: Jì Dé Wǒ Ài Nǐ) (4:24)
2. Your Body Temperature - 你的體温 (pinyin: Nǐ De Tī Wēn) (4:28)
3. Try To Love Me For A Day - 試著愛我一天 (pinyin: Shì Zhù Ài Wǒ Yì Tiān) (4:04)
4. Mama Said - 媽媽説 (pinyin: Mā Mā Shuì) (3:23)
5. How To Forget - 怎麽忘 (pinyin: Zěn Me Wàng) (5:27)
6. Guarantee Of Happiness - 幸福的保證 (pinyin: Xìng Fú De Bǎo Zhèng) (4:31)
7. Why Didn't You Come - 為何你不来 (pinyin: Wéi Hé Nǐ Bú Lái) (4:22)
8. Suddenly - 忽然 (pinyin: Hū Rán) (5:03)
9. Message Of Three Thousand Years - 三千年的留言 (pinyin: Sān Qiān Nián De Liú Yán) (4:39)
10. I Breathe You - 我呼吸你 (pinyin: Wǒ Hū Xī Nǐ) (4:54)
