= Embrace Your Shadow =

2005 Hong Kong film by Joe Ma

Embrace Your Shadow 摯愛
- Embrace Your Shadow theatrical poster
- Traditional Chinese: 摯愛
- Simplified Chinese: 挚爱
- Jyutping: zi3 oi3
- Directed by: Joe Ma
- Written by: Joe Ma; Melvin Li
- Produced by: Ivy Kong
- Starring: Fiona Sit; Dylan Kuo; Cheung Kwok-Keung; Chung Ching-Yu; Samuel Pang
- Cinematography: Cheung Man Po
- Edited by: Angie Lam
- Music by: Fiona Sit (songs)
- Production companies: Ming Film Limited; Beijing Bona Cultural Exchange Co., Ltd. Shan Xi Film Studio
- Distributed by: Mei Ah Entertainment
- Release date: 15 November 2005
- Running time: 102 minutes
- Country: Hong Kong
- Language: Cantonese

Embrace Your Shadow (Chinese: 摯愛; Jyutping: zi3 oi3) is a 2005 Hong Kong romance drama film starring Fiona Sit, Dylan Kuo, Cheung Kwok-Keung, Chung Ching-Yu and Samuel Pang, written and directed by Joe Ma.

== Background ==
This is Taiwanese actor, model, singer Dylan Kuo's first feature film. In the behind the scenes footage he is seen taking a crash course in Cantonese pronunciation from the director Joe Ma and other production crew members in order to know how to say his lines in Cantonese. Lead actress Fiona Sit said during her behind the scenes interview that Kuo character was originally intended to speak in Mandarin only, but seeing it's a Hong Kong film Kuo wanted his character to be believable as a Hong Kong resident so he decided to say as much of his lines in Cantonese as possible.

This is the second feature film for singer and actress Fiona Sit, who plays a more mature character facing tough situations in this film then her previous roles.

== Plot ==
Ran (Fiona Sit) is a 23-year-old girl that is burden with caring for her older brother Feng (Cheung Kwok Keung) who has a fatal hereditary disease called Arteritis that paralyzes the entire body. She also has to raise and care for his 6-year-old daughter Shiayou (Cheung Ching-yu). Feng's wife had taken the entire family savings and left them when she found out he was diagnose with his illness. Ran must take in work as a seamstress at home to make a living and make ends meet. She cares for her brother and niece by day and works throughout the night to rush her work deadline. She doesn't have an easy life so she always has a depressive and sad expression on her face. To make matters worst Ran is afraid one day she or Shiayou will end up like her brother since his illness is hereditary.

One day Shiayou meets small-time cat burglar Juchin (Dylan Kuo), when she sneaks out of the house to have a fun day in the city and gets lost. He brings her back home and gets to know the family. From that day on he visits them frequently and takes care of Feng and Shiayou. He eventually rents the unit above Ran's unit to store his stolen goods. Ran soon develops gratitude for Juchin, because some of her daily burdens have been lifted from her. Love soon develops between her and Juchin as they get to know each other better.

Juchin continues his daily life as a burglar in order to finance Shiayou's future studies at a music academy. However, he also gets tangled up with local triad boss Fu (Samuel Pang) who wants him to join his gang. Juchin has no interest joining Fu's gang or becoming a triad member. For this Fu makes trouble for Juchin as anyone who refuses to cooperate with Fu becomes his enemy.

== Cast ==
- Fiona Sit as Ran
- Dylan Kuo as Juchin
- Cheung Kwok-Keung as Feng
- Chung Ching-Yu as Shiayou
- Samuel Pang as Fu
