= Wong Chun-chun =

Hong Kong filmmaker

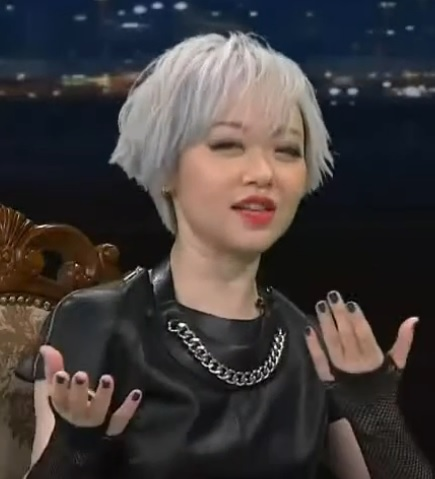
- Wong in April 2016
- Born: 5 October 1972 (age 53); British Hong Kong
- Other names: Barbara Wong; Wong Jan-jan; Huang Zhenzhen
- Education: New York University Tisch School of the Arts
- Occupations: Film director, screenwriter, actress, producer
- Years active: 2000–present
- Partner(s): Gus Liem (engaged; 2017−present)

Chinese name
- Traditional Chinese: 黃真真
- Simplified Chinese: 黄真真
- Hanyu Pinyin: Huáng Zhēnzhēn
- Jyutping: Wong4 Zan1 Zan1

Wong Chun-chun (Chinese: 黃真真; born 5 October 1972) is a Hong Kong film director, screenwriter, actress and producer. She is known for her female-centric films which include Women's Private Parts (2000), Truth or Dare: 6th Floor Rear Flat (2003) and The Stolen Years (2013). Wong was awarded the "Hong Kong Ten Outstanding Young Persons" by the Junior Chamber International Hong Kong in 2002, and "Young Achiever of the Year" in the Women of Influence award by United States Chamber of Commerce in 2007.

== Early life and education ==
Born and raised in Hong Kong, Wong graduated from The Hong Kong Academy for Performing Arts in 1990. After graduation, she worked at Commercial Radio Hong Kong as a disc jockey. In 1993, Wong moved to New York to further her studies where she graduated from New York University Tisch School of the Arts. Her graduation work HUGO was selected as an NYU Best Student Film.

== Career ==
After graduating from New York University Tisch School of the Arts, Wong stayed in New York and produced the short film, The Hipster. In 1995, Wong established a production company in New York, Basko Wong Productions, to produce television programs for several networks such as ABC and NBC. In 1997, Wong directed her first low-budget independent feature film, A Carburetor for Suzy (1998), at her own expense. The film was screened at NewFilmmakers New York series of Anthology Film Archives in 1998.

In 1999, she returned to Hong Kong from New York and filmed Women's Private Parts (2000), a documentary interviewing Chinese women about how they view their bodies and how they express their attitudes and thoughts towards sexuality. This film in particular piqued the interest of not only the Hong Kong film industry, but was recognized internationally and subsequently went on to win Best International Feature Film at the New York City Independent Film Festival in 2001. Following this, Wong directed Men's Private Parts (2002) as a sequel to Women's Private Parts, which interviewed 30 men about their attitudes and thoughts towards sex, love, and power.

In 2003, Wong collaborated with Lawrence Cheng to produce the comedy, Truth or Dare: 6th Floor Rear Flat (2003), inspired by Madonna's documentary, Madonna: Truth or Dare (1991). The narrative is a story of six youths living in a 6th floor rear flat in Hong Kong. As a result, Wong was also nominated for Best New Director at the 23rd Hong Kong Film Awards.

Wong continued to shape the Hong Kong community, going on to film Six Strong Guys (2004), Protégé de la Rose Noire (2004), Wonder Women (2007), Happy Funeral (2008) and Break Up Club (2010). Of these, Wonder Women (2007) was filmed to celebrate Hong Kong's tenth anniversary of its handover, and the film was premiered at the Great Hall of the People in 2007.

Since releasing the film The Allure of Tears (2011), Wong has shifted her focus from Hong Kong to the mainland, gearing into a more commercial direction. She has since directed several romance-drama films such as The Stolen Years (2013), Girls (2014), The Secret (2016), Girls 2: Girls vs Gangsters (2018) and Don't Forget I Love You (2022).

== Filmography ==
=== As filmmaker ===
Year	Film	Credited as		
Year	Film	Director	Writer	Producer
1998	A Carburetor for Suzy	Yes	No	No
2000	Women's Private Parts	Yes	No	No
2003	Truth or Dare: 6th Floor Rear Flat	Yes	Yes	No
2004	Protégé de la Rose Noire	Yes	No	No
2004	Six Strong Guys	Yes	Yes	No
2007	Wonder Women	Yes	Yes	No
2008	Happy Funeral	Yes	Yes	No
2010	Break Up Club	Yes	Yes	Yes
2010	Perfect Wedding	Yes	No	No
2011	The Allure of Tears	Yes	Yes	No
2013	The Stolen Years	Yes	Yes	No
2014	Girls	Yes	Yes	No
2016	The Secret	Yes	Yes	Yes
2016	708090	No	Yes	No
2018	Girls 2	Yes	Yes	Yes
2022	Don't Forget I Love You	Yes	Yes	No

=== As actress ===
- Mighty Baby (2002)
- Runaway Pistol (2002) - Jade
- Truth or Dare: 6th Floor Rear Flat (2003) - Amy
- Fear of Intimacy (2004)
- Six Strong Guys (2004) - Bride
- Escape from Hong Kong Island (2004) - Raymond's Sister
- All's Well, Ends Well 2009 (2004) - Servant
- Girls (2014)

=== Variety, reality and cultural show ===
- Close To Culture (2006) - Guest host
- King Maker III (2020) - Guest judge

== Awards and nominations ==
Year	Award	Category	Nominated work	Result
1998	Anthology Film Archives	NewFilmmakers New York series	A Carburetor for Suzy	Won
2001	New York City Independent Film Festival	Best International Feature Film	Women's Private Parts	Won
2002	Junior Chamber International Hong Kong	Hong Kong Ten Outstanding Young Persons	—N/a	Honored
2003	22nd Hong Kong Film Awards	Best New Performer	The Runaway Pistol	Nominated
2004	23rd Hong Kong Film Awards	Best New Director	Truth or Dare: 6th Floor Rear Flat	Nominated
2005	24th Hong Kong Film Awards	Best Director	Six Strong Guys	Nominated
2005	8th Shanghai International Film Festival	Asian New Talent Award Best Film	Six Strong Guys	Nominated
2011	30th Hong Kong Film Awards	Best Screenplay	Break Up Club	Nominated
2014	6th Macau International Movie Festival	Golden Lotus Award for Best Writing	708090	Nominated
