= Smile (Fiona album) =

Studio album by Fiona Sit
- Released: December 19, 2008
- Genre: Cantopop
- Length: 0:36:47
- Producer: Warner Music Hong Kong

Fiona Sit chronology
It's My Day	Smile

Smile is the sixth album by Fiona (Chinese: 薛凱琪), released on December 19, 2008. This is her first Cantopop album since Electric Angel, which was released two years earlier.

== Track listing ==
1. Just Believe (Instrumental)
2. 天國的微笑 (Heaven's Smile)
3. 甜蜜蜜 (Sweet)
4. 不呼不吸幾多秒 (The few seconds without breath)
5. 劍龍在草地散步 (Stegosaurus strolling on the grass)
6. My Choice (Instrumental)
7. My Choice X
8. 一個人一支燈 (One person, One Light)
9. 難道你不怕凍 (Are you not scared of the cold?)
10. 天國的微笑 (Heaven's Smile Reprise)

Bonus Track

1. 甜蜜蜜 ("Sweet" duet version with Joey Leung)
2. 給十年後的我 (10 Year's Later duet version with Edmond Tong )
