= It's My Day =

Studio album by Fiona Sit
- Released: April 18, 2008
- Genre: Cantopop
- Producer: Warner Music Hong Kong

Fiona Sit chronology
Electric Angel	It's My Day	Smile

It's My Day is the fifth album by Fiona Sit, and her 1st Mandarin album. It was released on April 18, 2008. After one and a half years since Electric Angel, Sit created her debut Mandarin album after mastering the dialect.

== Track listing ==
1. It's My Day
2. 黑色淚滴 (Black Tears)
3. 一個人失憶 (One Person's Memory)
4. 復刻回憶 (Overcoming Memories, Duet with Khalil Fong)
5. 愛麗絲的第一次 (Alice's first Time)
6. 我不需要TIFFANY (I don't need Tiffany)
7. 半路 (Halfway)
8. 找到天使了 (Finding the Angel)
9. Red is...
10. 新不了情 (Endless Love, theme song of the series in the same name.)
