= Vic Chou =

- 周渝民
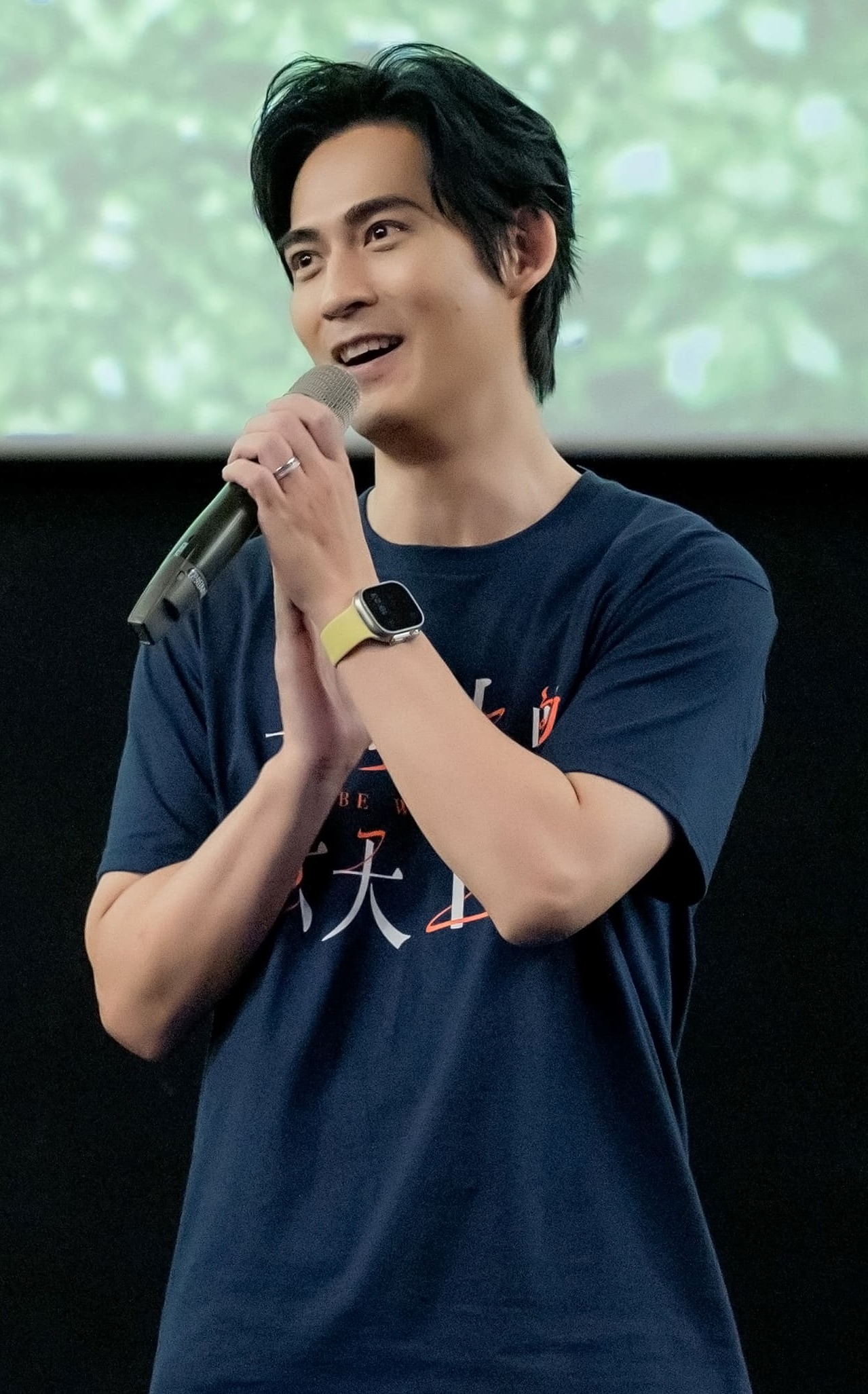
- Chou in 2023
- Born: Zhōu Yùmín (周育民); June 9, 1981 (age 45); Luodong, Yilan, Taiwan
- Other name: 仔仔 (pinyin: Zǎizai)
- Occupations: Actor, singer
- Years active: 2001–present
- Spouse: Reen Yu (m. 2015)
- Children: 1
- Awards: 48th Golden Bell Awards; 2012 Best Actor – Home
- Musical career
- Genres: Mandopop, Rock music
- Label: Sony Music Taiwan

Vic Chou (Chinese: 周渝民; pinyin: Zhōu Yúmín; Pe̍h-ōe-jī: Chiu Jû-bîn; born June 9, 1981) is a Taiwanese actor and singer. He is a member of the Taiwanese boy band F4.

== Career ==
=== F4 ===
Chou rose to fame for his role as Hua Ze Lei in the highly popular Taiwan television series Meteor Garden. At the conclusion of the series, Chou, along with the other cast members of Meteor Garden—Jerry Yan, Vanness Wu and Ken Chu—, continued to perform together and released three studio albums as the quartet boy band F4.

Chou reunited with fellow F4 members Jerry and Vanness for their F Forever 1st World Concert Tour. On June 27, 2026, they performed at the Philippine Arena for their Manila leg of the tour.

=== Solo music career ===
Chou was the first F4 member to release his own album, Make a Wish, in January 2002. This was followed by Remember, I Love You, which was released in January 2004. His third album, I'm Not F4, was released in October 2007 and topped Taiwan's major charts for 3 weeks.

In April 2026, Chou marked his return to the music scene with the release of his new single "You Are My Courage", following several years focused primarily on acting.

=== Acting career ===
Aside from Meteor Garden, Chou has appeared in Taiwanese series such as Poor Prince and Love Storm, considered to be very "typical" idol dramas. However, with the 2004 television series Mars, Zhou took on a more complex role as a set of twins who have mental illnesses. Zhou considers a turning point in his career. In many interviews, Zhou has pinpointed this as the moment where his interest in acting was truly piqued. Since then, he has taken on increasingly multi-facted roles, such as an ambitious but lonely businessman in Silence, a cranky perfectionist in Sweet Relationship, and an awkward but passionate novelist in Wish to See You Again.

In 2008, Chou embarked on his first film, Linger, alongside Li Bingbing.

In 2009, he took a departure from Taiwanese idol dramas and starred in the police drama Black & White. Zhou takes on the challenging role of an emotionally complex policeman with a past that is thrown into a dangerous web of corruption. Chou was nominated for Best Actor at the 44th Golden Bell Awards for his performance in Black & White.

In 2010, Chou won "Most Popular Taiwanese Actor" at the Seoul International Drama Awards. The same year, he starred in the romance film Love You 10,000 Years. The film was the 5th best-selling Chinese film in Taiwan for 2010, and won "Most Popular with the Audience" at the 6th Osaka Asian Film Festival.

In 2012, Chou starred alongside Ella Chen in the romance comedy film New Perfect Two.

In 2013, Chou won the Golden Bell Award for Best Actor for his performance in Home. He went on to star in sequel films Don't Go Breaking My Heart 2, Go Lala Go 2, and Storm (sequel of Z Storm); as well as suspense film Detective Gui and comedy film Two Wrongs Make A Right.

Chou returned to the small screen after five years in 2018, starring in two period dramas Beauties in the Closet and The Flame's Daughter. He is set to star in the historical drama Poetry of the Song Dynasty alongside Liu Tao, portraying Zhao Heng.

== Filmography ==
=== Film ===
Year	English title	Original title	Role
2008	Linger	蝴蝶飞	Lin Xudong
2008	Tea Fight	斗茶	Brother Yang
2010	Love You 10,000 Years	爱你一万年	Wu Qifeng
2011	Sleepless Fashion	与时尚同居	Zhou Xiaohui
2012	New Perfect Two	新天生一对	Ah B
2013	Saving General Yang	忠烈杨家将	Yang San Lang
2013	Day of Redemption	早见，晚爱	Gu Bin
2013	A Moment of Love	回到爱开始的地方	Xu Nianzu
2014	Don't Go Breaking My Heart 2	单身男女2	Cheng Zijian
2015	Detective Gui	宅女侦探桂香	Ah Zhe
2015	Go Lala Go 2	杜拉拉追婚记	Wang Wei
2016	S Storm	反贪风暴2	Song Renxin
2017	Two Wrongs Make a Right	天生不对	Qin Rui
2023	Be With Me	车顶上的玄天上帝	Chun Shan/ Ri Xing

=== Television series ===
Year	English title	Chinese title	Role
2001	Meteor Garden	流星花園	Huā Zé Lèi
2001	Poor Prince	贫穷贵公子	Shān Tián Tài Láng
2001	Meteor Rain	流星雨	Huā Zé Lèi
2002	Come to My Place	来我家吧	Zhang Zhongyuan
2002	Meteor Garden II	流星花園II	Huā Zé Lèi
2003	Love Storm	狂爱龙卷风	Lù Yǐngfēng
2004	Mars	战神	Chén Líng, Chén Shèng
2006	Silence	深情密码	Qi Weiyi
2007	Sweet Relationship	美味关系	Fang Zhitian
2008	Wish to See You Again	这里发现爱	Xu Le
2009	Black and White	痞子英雄	Chen Zai Tian
2009	Memoirs Of Madam Jin	金大班	Sheng Yueru
2012	Home	回家 / 彼岸1945	Su Taiying
2018	Beauties in the Closet	柜中美人	Li Han
2018	The Flame's Daughter	烈火如歌	Yin Xue
2021	Palace of Devotion	大宋宫词	Zhao Heng
2021	Danger Zone	逆局	Liang Yan Dong
2023	Reblooming Blue	另一种蓝	Ke Yan
2023	The World Between Us II	我们与恶的距离 II	Ma Yi Sen

== Discography ==
=== Studio albums ===
Album #	Album info
1st	Make a Wish: Released: January 11, 2002; Label: Sony Music Taiwan; Language: Mandarin; Format: Studio album (CD); Genre: Mandopop
2nd	Remember, I Love You (記得我愛你): Released: January 2, 2004; Label: Sony Music Taiwan; Language: Mandarin; Format: Studio album (CD); Genre: Mandopop
3rd	I'm Not F4 (我不是F4): Released: October 29, 2007; Label: Sony Music Taiwan; Language: Mandarin; Format: Studio album (CD); Genre: Mandopop

=== Singles ===
Year	Album	Title	Notes
2003	Love Storm Original Soundtrack	"I breathe You" (我呼吸你)	
2004	Mars Original Soundtrack	"Let Me Love You" (让我爱你)	duet with Barbie Hsu
2004		"Just For You"	
2006	Silence Original Soundtrack	"Familiar Gentleness" (熟悉的温柔)	
2010	Love You 10000 Years Original Soundtrack	"Love You 10000 Years" (爱你一万年)	
2010	Love You 10000 Years Original Soundtrack	"When I Think of You, You are Asleep" (我在想你的时候睡着了)	
2011	C'Est La V	"Do it"	Vanness Wu feat. Vic Chou
2013	Day of Redemption Original Soundtrack	"Stubborn Ant" (倔强的蚂蚁)	
2026		"You Are My Courage" (谁给我的勇气)	

== Publications ==
He also released a photographic album in October 2002, titled Travel Dream (流浪夢), which contains his pictures shot during one of his trips to Hokkaidō, Japan.

His second photobook titled 4Faces: Taipei & Tokyo was released in October 2006. There are 4 themes: Natural Face, Cool Face, Stylish Face and Fashionable Face. The first 2 themes were shot in Taipei while the last 2 themes were shot in Tokyo.

== Awards and nominations ==
Year	Award	Category	Nominated work	Results	Ref.
2009	44th Golden Bell Awards	Best Actor	Black & White	Nominated	
2010	3rd Seoul International Drama Awards	Popular Actor	—N/a	Won	
2013	5th Macau International Movie Festival	Best Supporting Actor	Saving General Yang	Nominated	
2013	48th Golden Bell Awards	Best Actor	Coming Home	Won	
2018	24th Huading Awards	Best Actor (Ancient Drama)	The Flame's Daughter	Nominated	
2022	2022 Asian Academy Creative Awards	Best Actor in Leading Role	Danger Zone	Nominated	
2022	Huading Awards	Best Actor (Modern TV Series)	Danger Zone	Nominated	
2024	26th Taipei Film Awards	Best Actor	Be With Me	Nominated	
