= Break Up Club =

2010 Hong Kong film by Barbara Wong

- Film poster
- Traditional Chinese: 分手說愛你
- Simplified Chinese: 分手说爱你
- Hanyu Pinyin: Fēn Shǒu Shuō Ài Nǐ
- Jyutping: Fan1 Sau2 Syut3 Oi3 Nei2
- Directed by: Barbara Wong
- Written by: Lawrence Cheng; Barbara Wong
- Produced by: Lawrence Cheng; Barbara Wong; Gus Liem
- Starring: Jaycee Chan; Fiona Sit; Patrick Tang; Hayama Go; Bonnie Sin
- Cinematography: Kenny Tse
- Edited by: Azrael Chung
- Music by: Mak Chun Hung
- Production company: Diva Productions Limited
- Distributed by: Golden Scene Co. Ltd.
- Release date: 16 June 2010
- Running time: 104 minutes
- Country: Hong Kong
- Language: Cantonese
- Box office: HK$10,333,691

Break Up Club (Chinese: 分手說愛你) is a 2010 Hong Kong romance film starring Jaycee Chan and Fiona Sit. This film revolves around a website that allows users to win back lost loves, so long as they agree to break up another happy couple.

== Reception ==
The film received generally positive reviews from the Hong Kong media.

Perry Lam of Muse Magazine wrote, "Wong juggles a mixed bag of styles, including mockumentary and DIY video, and conjures up a teen romance that tries to tug at your heartstrings one moment, and make you laugh your head off the next."

== Cast ==
Cast	Role
Jaycee Chan	Joe Chan
Fiona Sit	Flora
Patrick Tang	Sunny
Hayama Go	Lies Hayama
Bonnie Sin	Fanny
Lawrence Cheng	Himself
Barbara Wong	Herself
Gus Liem	Himself
