= 'F' Debut =

Studio album by Fiona Sit
- Released: April 8, 2004
- Genre: Cantopop
- Producer: Warner Music Hong Kong

Fiona Sit chronology
| 'F' Debut | 886 |

'F' Debut is the first album by Fiona Sit, released 8 April 2004 it was a best-seller in Hong Kong, and was awarded gold for sales as it sold more than 25,000 copies.

== Track listing ==
1. "XBF" – 4:12
2. "麥當娜一吻" (Madonna's kiss) – 2:56
3. "奇洛李維斯回信" (Keanu Reeves Reply) – 4:02
4. "上帝是男孩" (God is a Boy) – 3:13
5. "趕" (Out!) – 3:37
6. "小聰明" (Smart) – 3:36
7. "醜小鴨天鵝湖" (The Ugly Duckling) – 4:13
8. "冬眠" (Hibernate) – 4:09
9. "影迷少女" (Cinemamania) – 4:23
10. "XBF" (Soft Mix) – 4:03
11. "Vie Ya" (Hibernate English Version) – 4:08
