= Girls (2014 film) =

- Film poster
- Directed by: Wong Chun-chun
- Written by: Wong Chun-chun; Erica Li; Silver Hau; Skipper Cheng
- Produced by: Andy Chen; Gus Liem; Lin Chaoyang; Grace Song
- Starring: Ivy Chen; Fiona Sit; Yang Zishan; Shawn Yue; Wallace Chung; Vanness Wu
- Cinematography: Chen Cheng
- Edited by: Eric Kwong; Li Ka-wing
- Music by: Mark Lui
- Distributed by: Fujian Hangye Film Distribution
- Release date: July 30, 2014
- Running time: 118 minutes
- Country: China
- Language: Mandarin
- Box office: US$32,210,000

Girls (Chinese: 闺蜜) is a Chinese romantic-drama film directed by Wong Chun-chun and starring Ivy Chen, Fiona Sit, Yang Zishan, Shawn Yue, Wallace Chung and Vanness Wu. Originally scheduled for release on July 31, 2014, the film was moved a day earlier to July 30, 2014.

In its first week of release, Girls grossed US$16.79 million in its first five days, with 111,869 screenings and 3.25 million admissions.

== Cast ==
- Ivy Chen
- Fiona Sit
- Yang Zishan
- Shawn Yue
- Wallace Chung
- Vanness Wu
