= Lü Jie =

Chinese model

Lü Jie (simplified Chinese: 吕洁; traditional Chinese: 呂潔; pinyin: Lǚ Jié; English name Amy Lu) is a Cantonese actress and model active in mainland China and Hong Kong.

Lü Jie graduated from Zhixin High School in Guangzhou, Guangdon, China, and the Guangzhou Institute of Foreign Languages with a degree in French.

She started her career as an advertisement and TV commercial model in 1998. She later moved into sitcoms and TV drama in early 2002. She played roles in various Hong Kong box office films including Kung Fu Football. Notable collaborators included Lau Ching Wan and Kent Cheng.

== Filmography ==
=== TV series ===
- 2001: 《网络情人》 " Internet Lover " as Xiao Xiao
- 2002: 《柴米新人类》" Chaimi New Human " as GIGI
- 2003: 《功夫足球》" Kung Fu Football " decorated with beads
- 2004: 《伙头智多星》" Man, Wisdom, Many Stars " as a psychiatrist
- 2006: 《美梦人生》"A Dream of Life " decorated with hoarfrost
- 2007: 《新不了情》 " New Love " as Wan Shaoling
- 2008: 《外地媳妇本地郎》" Foreign Wife and Local Lang " as Tang Zhiruo
- 2008: 《广州人家》" Guangzhou People " as Chen Jiamei
- 2010: 《电视台的故事》" The Story of TV Station "

=== Films ===
- 2003: The End of Counterfeit Banknotes (伪钞的末日)
- 2004: Itchy Heart (七年很痒) as Mable
- 2005: Backup Sweetheart (后备甜心) as Helen
- 2006: Love Boxing (情意拳拳) as Macy
- 2006: Heavenly Mission (天行者) as Lu Wenli
- 2007: Exodus (出埃及记)
- 2008: The opening film of the Hong Kong Film Festival (香港电影节开幕电影)
- 2010: The King of Gun King (鎗王之王)
- 2012: Marrying Mr. Perfect (嫁個100分男人) as the hostess
- 2012: Naked Soldier (赤裸戰士)

== See also ==
- List of movies set in Hong Kong
- Cinema of China
