= The Stolen Years (2013 film) =

- Film poster
- Directed by: Wong Chun-chun
- Screenplay by: Skipper Cheng; Wong Chun-chun; Daryl Doo; Silver Hau
- Produced by: Daniel Chan; Peggy Chiao
- Starring: Bai Baihe; Joseph Chang; Christine Fan
- Cinematography: Chen Cheng
- Edited by: Kwong Chi-Leung
- Music by: Henry Lai
- Production companies: China Movie Channel; Beijing New Film Association
- Release date: August 29, 2013
- Running time: 111 minutes
- Country: Taiwan
- Language: Chinese Mandarin
- Box office: $23,840,000

The Stolen Years (Chinese: 被偷走的那五年; pinyin: Bèi tōu zǒu dì nà wǔ nián) is a 2013 romance drama film directed by Wong Chun-chun and starring Bai Baihe, Joseph Chang and Christine Fan.

== Plot ==
He-Mann (Bai Baihe) lost her memories five years ago when she had an accident. When she finally woke up, she could not understand why she and her husband had divorced, why her best friend is now her enemy, or why colleagues all avoided and tried to stay away from her. In order to learn about her past, she starts on her search of her lost memories with the help of her ex-husband. But as they discover more, they then realise more.

== Cast ==
- Bai Baihe
- Joseph Chang
- Christine Fan
- Amber An
- Ken Lin
- Tse Kwan-ho
- Queenie Tai
- Sky Wu

== Critical reception ==
Andrew Chan of the Film Critics Circle of Australia writes, "While it does not feel as realistic as say her best works (“Break Up Club”), this is an easy film to take as it engages without being pretentious and emotes without extravagance."
