= Nissan Bluebird =

Compact car produced by Nissan (1955-2007)

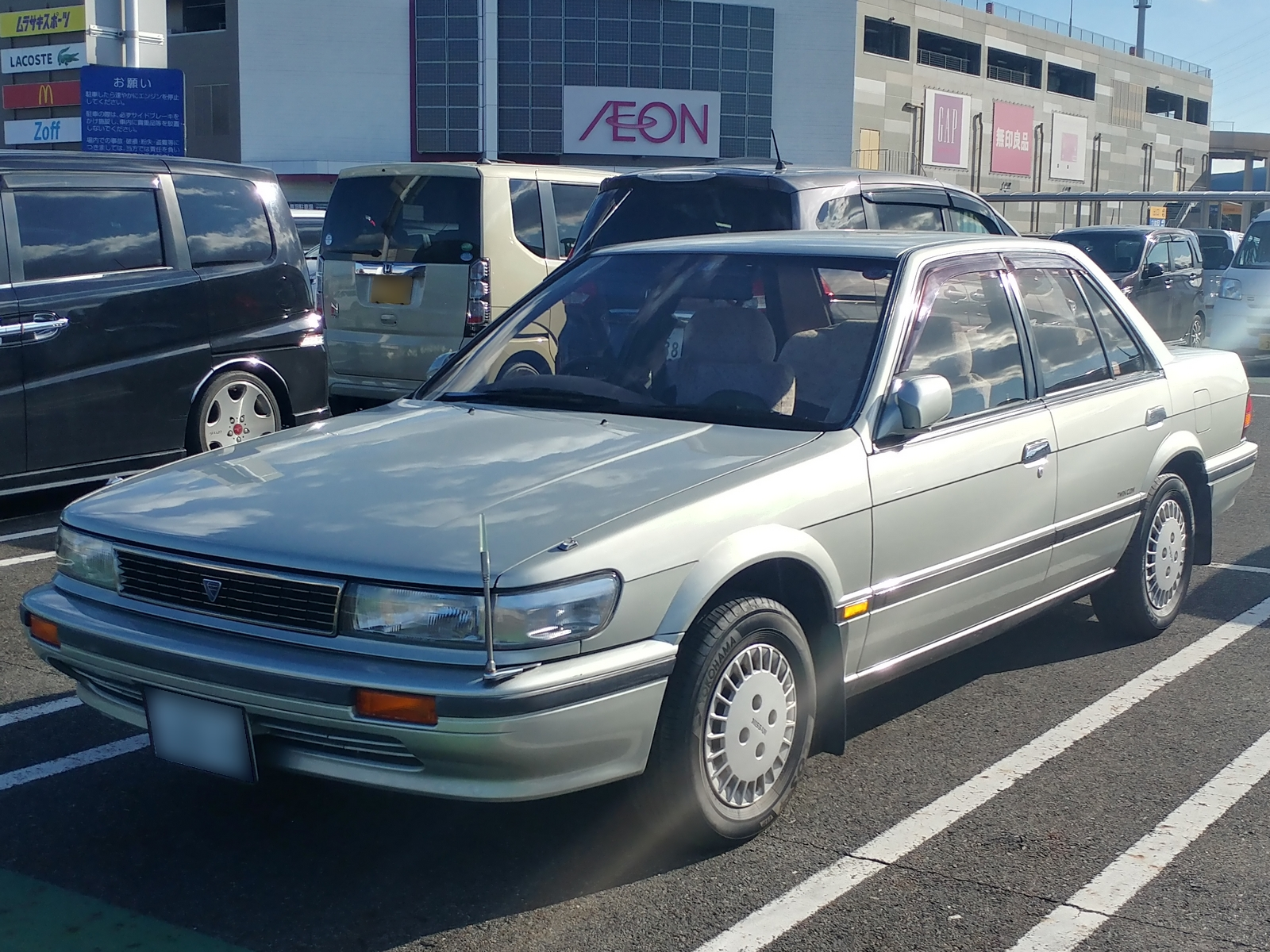
- Nissan Bluebird (U12)

Overview
- Manufacturer: Nissan
- Production: 1955–2001 (until 2007 in China)

Body and chassis
- Class: Compact car
- Body style: 4-door sedan; 4-door hardtop sedan; 2-door coupé; 5-door station wagon
- Layout: Front-engine, rear-wheel-drive (1955–1983); Front-engine, front-wheel-drive (1983–2007); Front-engine, four-wheel-drive (1991–2001)

Chronology
- Successor: Nissan Sylphy

The Nissan Bluebird (Japanese: 日産・ブルーバード, Hepburn: Nissan Burūbādo) is a compact car produced between 1955 and 2007 with a model name introduced in 1957. It was Nissan's most internationally recognized sedan, known for its dependability and durability in multiple body styles. The Bluebird originated from Nissan's first vehicles, dating to the early 1900s, and its traditional competitor became the Toyota Corona. The Bluebird was positioned to compete with the Corona, as the Corona was developed to continue offering a sedan used as a taxi since the Toyota Crown was growing in size. Every generation of the Bluebird has been available as a taxi, duties that are shared with base level Nissan Cedrics. It is one of the longest-running nameplates from a Japanese automaker.

== Export and foreign-built model names ==
Export versions were originally sold as "Datsun" followed by the engine displacement in cubic centimetres, (Datsun 1000, Datsun 1300 and so on) but were also variously sold as the Datsun 510, Datsun 180B (also in 160B and 200B versions depending on engine fitment) and the Datsun Bluebird. The Nissan Bluebird nameplate began appearing in export markets around 1982 as the Datsun marque was phased out in favour of Nissan.

From 1981 to 1985, Australia followed the Japanese convention by calling its car the Bluebird, and had a unique, facelifted rear-wheel-drive version for 1984 and 1985. That car was replaced in 1986 by the Nissan Pintara. It would be replaced by the successive Bluebird, also called Pintara, until 1992; then the range was brought in line with the Japanese model, for the U13 series from 1993 to 1997. In an unusual twist, brought about under the short lived Button Plan, the Pintara was also rebadged for Ford Australia as the Ford Corsair – reviving a Ford UK nameplate last used in the 1960s.

In the United States, the Bluebird was initially sold as a Datsun, named by engine size, until the introduction of the 510 which was sold by the internal model code. By the 1980s, the Bluebird was sold as the Nissan Stanza in the US. In 1992, the next generation Bluebird became the Nissan Altima. This was the last car from the Bluebird line to be sold in North America; in 1998, the Altima was completely redesigned, becoming a separate model, unique to the North American market. A six-cylinder version called the Maxima (originally the Datsun 810) was released in the 1980s and became a separate model. The Bluebird sold in Europe between 1986 and 1990 was in fact a rebadged Nissan Auster — this was replaced by the Primera in Nissan's European line-up in 1990.

== Historic vehicles ==
The DAT corporation had been producing cars since 1914, but through the 1920s, much of their profitability depended on government subsidies of their large trucks. A 1930 ministerial ordinance by the Japanese government declared that drivers' licenses would not be required for cars with engines up to 500 cc displacement, and that the purchase of these vehicles would be taxed at a lower rate. DAT began to produce a small car for this market. The new car was called "Datson"(i.e. "Son of DAT") and later "Datsun" to distinguish it from the full-sized trucks and cars the company had produced in the past.

=== Datsun Type 10–17 ===
==== Type 10 ====
Datsun Type 10

Overview
- Production: 1930
- Assembly: Japan
- Designer: Takayoshi Gotou

Body and chassis
- Body style: phaeton, van, roadster

In 1929, DAT built a small-car prototype called the DAT 91. They ended up marketing this model as the DATSON Type 10 ("son of DAT"), since it was a shrunken version of the earlier 31. "DAT" was now a backronym for Durable, Attractive, and Trustworthy. The car fit into a new category of small cars, limited to half a litre's displacement. The production version was powered by DAT's own four-cylinder, side-valve engine of 495 cc. It (and the inauspicious "DATSON" name, with "son" being close to 損, the Japanese word for "loss") was replaced by the Datsun Type 11 in 1932.

==== Types 11–14 ====
Datsun Types 11-14
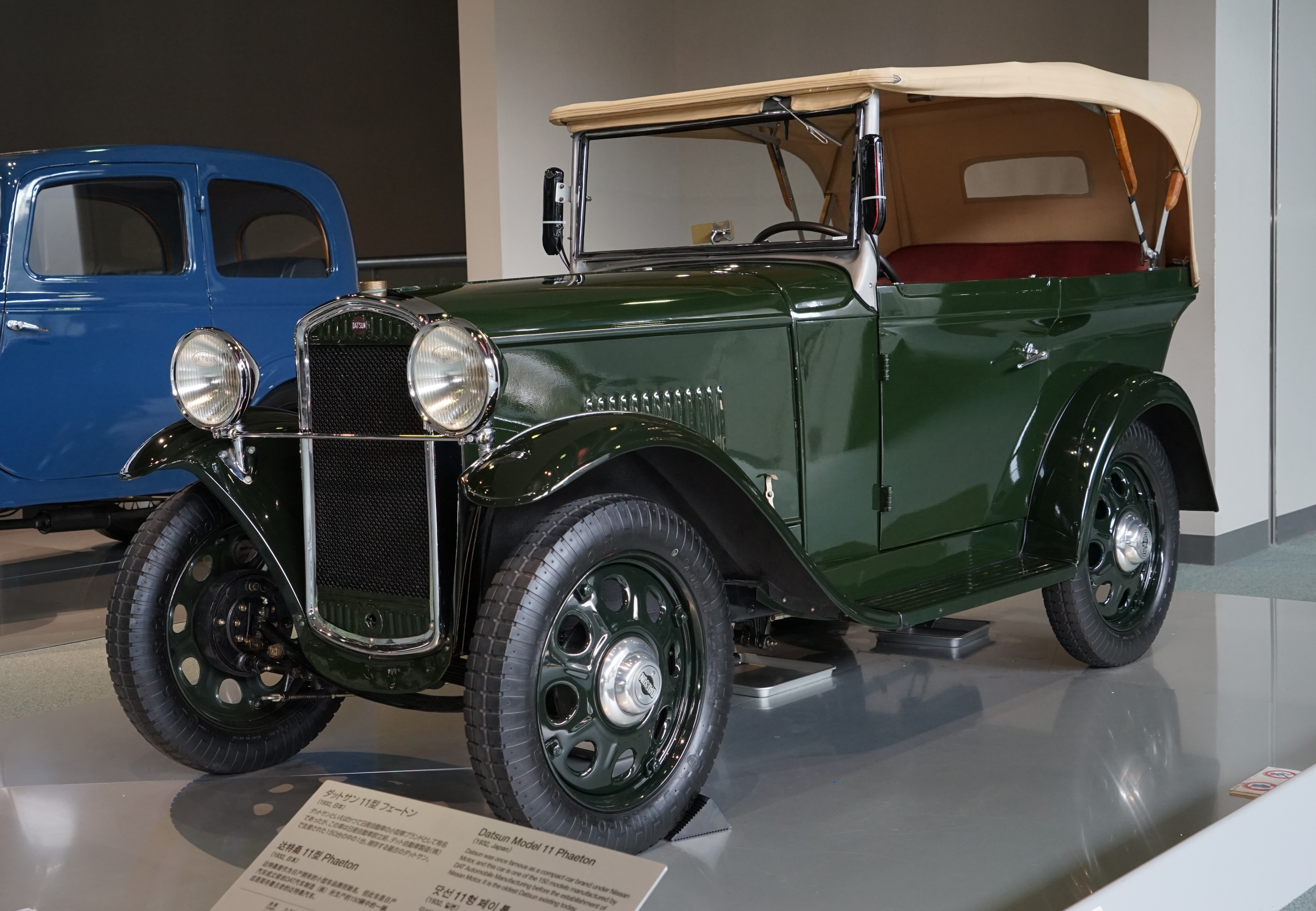
- Datsun Type 11 phaeton

Overview
- Manufacturer: Datsun/Nissan
- Production: 1932; 150 produced
- Assembly: Japan: Yokohama Plant, Kanagawa-ku, Yokohama
- Designer: Noriyoshi Gotoh

Body and chassis
- Body style: phaeton, roadster, coupe, sedan, van
- Layout: FR layout

Powertrain
- Engine: 11: 495 cc DAT SV I4; 14: 722 cc Type 7 SV I4; 12/13: 747 cc DAT SV I4
- Transmission: 3-speed manual

Dimensions
- Wheelbase: 1,880 mm (74.0 in)
- Length: 2,710 mm (106.7 in)
- Width: 1,175 mm (46.3 in)
- Curb weight: 2,355 lb (1,068 kg)

Chronology
- Successor: Datsun Type 15

The 1932 Datsun Type 11 was a small car with a 495 cc, 10 HP side valve engine and a three speed transmission. It was offered in several body styles; DAT/Nissan sold 150 of the Type 11 in 1932. The Type 11 was only produced during the year 1932, as changes in the law allowed Nissan to sell a new model with a larger engine in 1933.

The Datsun Type 11 had the same engine displacement and external dimensions as an Austin Seven, and information about the British car was widely available within Japan. In October and November 1929, the chief engineer of Austin presented a paper in Tokyo called "The British Light Car". This paper is supposed to have provided detailed explanations and illustrations of many of the mechanical components of the Austin Seven. The exact relationship between the two cars is, however, in dispute. Some authors say that it was a licensed copy of the Seven. Others insist it was a copy, but not an authorized one. Herbert Austin was definitely concerned about the possibility of the Datsun infringing on his patents; he subsequently imported a 1935 Datsun to examine, but decided not to file a complaint. Some websites have pointed to this as evidence supporting the hypothesis that the Datsun was not a copy of the Austin. Other websites have pointed out that the decision to not press charges might have been because that by then the Datsun designs had begun to differ from those of the Austin.

The 1933 Datsun Type 12 was a small car produced by the Nissan corporation. The name Datsun was used by DAT for their line of small cars. After the DAT corporation was absorbed into Nissan, these cars continued to be produced, and the original model name was maintained. The Type 12 was basically similar to the earlier 1932 Type 11, but had a larger, 747 cc engine.

Japanese laws at that time did not require a license to drive automobiles with small-displacement engines. DAT/Nissan produced the Datsun Type 11 as their entry into this market. The original limitation for this class of vehicles was 500 cc displacement engines, but that was changed to 750 cc in 1933 and Nissan responded by producing a larger engine. They also gave the more powerful car a new name, the Type 12.

The 1934 Datsun Type 13 went into production in April 1934 with its chassis built in the Osaka Plant of the Automotive Division of Tobata Casting, which merged with Nihon Sangyo Co. (Nissan) after selling its factory. Its grille was chrome plated with a tall heart shaped opening instead of the Austin 7 like grille. It is the first Datsun model to have a truck variant called the 13T, along as being the first car exported from Japan; a total of 44 vehicles were exported to South Africa and Australia.

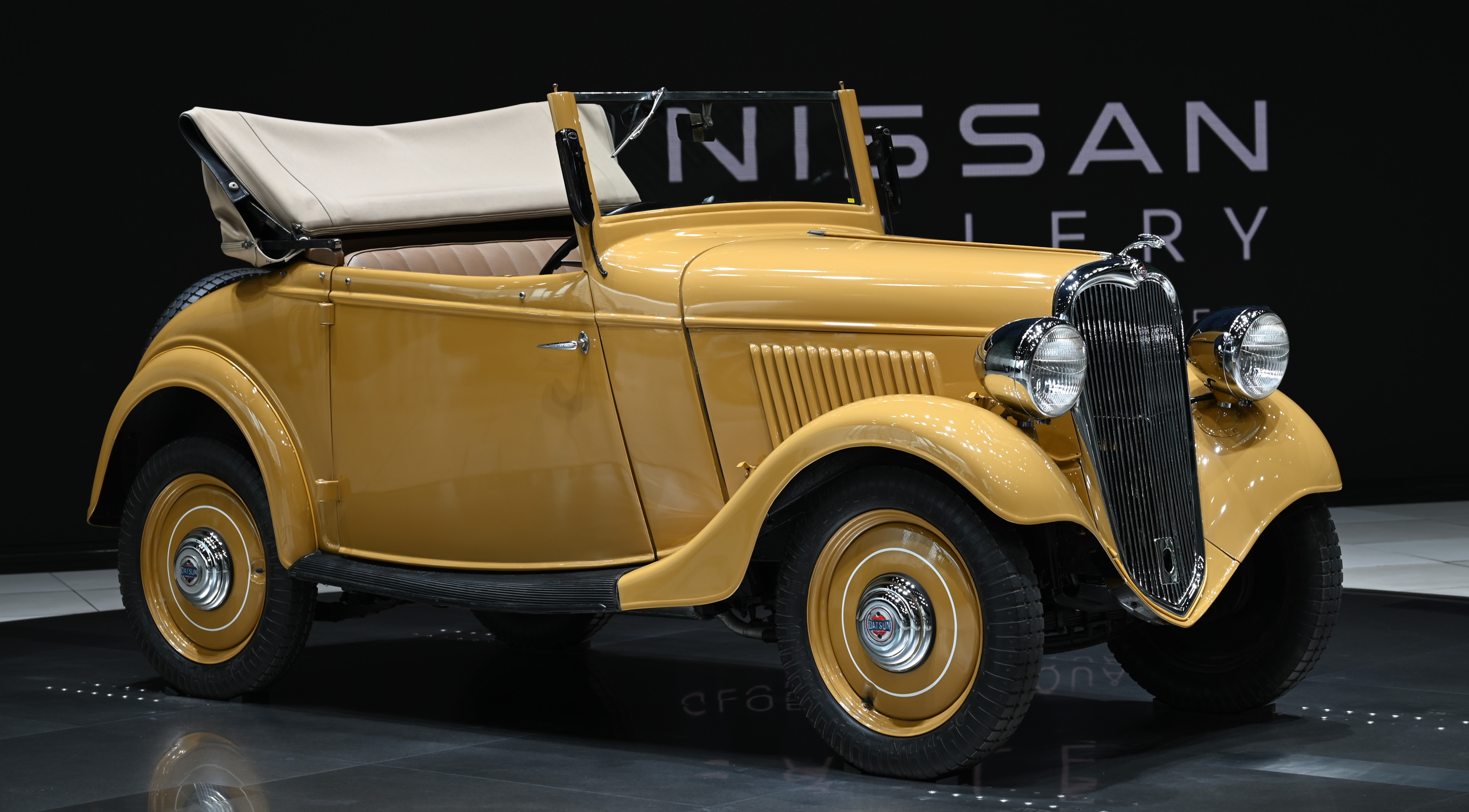
Datsun Type 14

The 1935 Datsun Type 14 is externally very similar to the Type 13 but uses the addition of a leaping rabbit emblem at the front. Mechanically, the old DAT engine of the Datsun 13 was replaced with the Datsun Type 7 engine, a side valve four-cylinder engine with a displacement of 722 cc (44.1 cu in). The Type 14 marked "the birth of the Japanese car industry" according to Britain's National Motor Museum at Beaulieu. Nissan produced the vehicle at Yokohama, along with its commercial truck version called the 14T.

==== Type 15–17 ====
Datsun Type 15
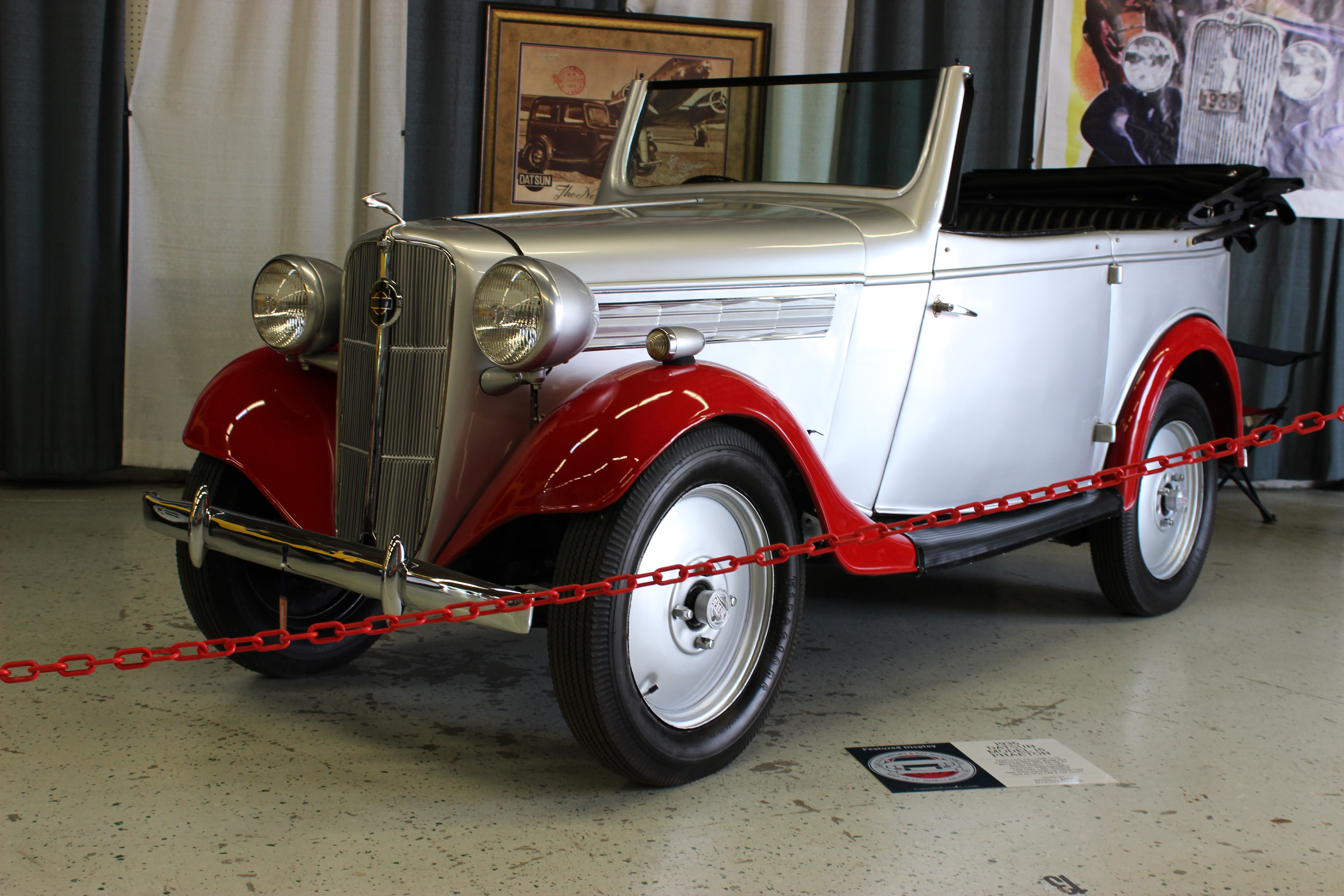

Overview
- Manufacturer: Datsun/Nissan
- Production: May 1936
- Assembly: Japan: Yokohama Plant, Kanagawa-ku, Yokohama

Body and chassis
- Body style: phaeton, roadster, coupe, sedan, van, truck (15T)

Powertrain
- Engine: 722 cc Type 7 SV I4
- Transmission: 3-speed manual

Chronology
- Successor: Datsun Type 16

The 1936 Datsun Type 15 was mechanically very similar to the preceding Datsun Type 14. The Type 7 engine was retained, by with a higher compression ratio, increased from 5.2 to 5.4, which increased power by 1 hp (0.75 kW). All Datsun 15 models have bumpers. Both the Type 15 and 15T were produced in Yokohama in May 1936, with the 15T having a different engine cover that has near vertical vents instead of the cars horizontal vents.

The Datsun Type 16 is the successor of the Type 15. It could only be differentiated externally by detailing on the bonnet and changes in the bonnet mascot and its logo.

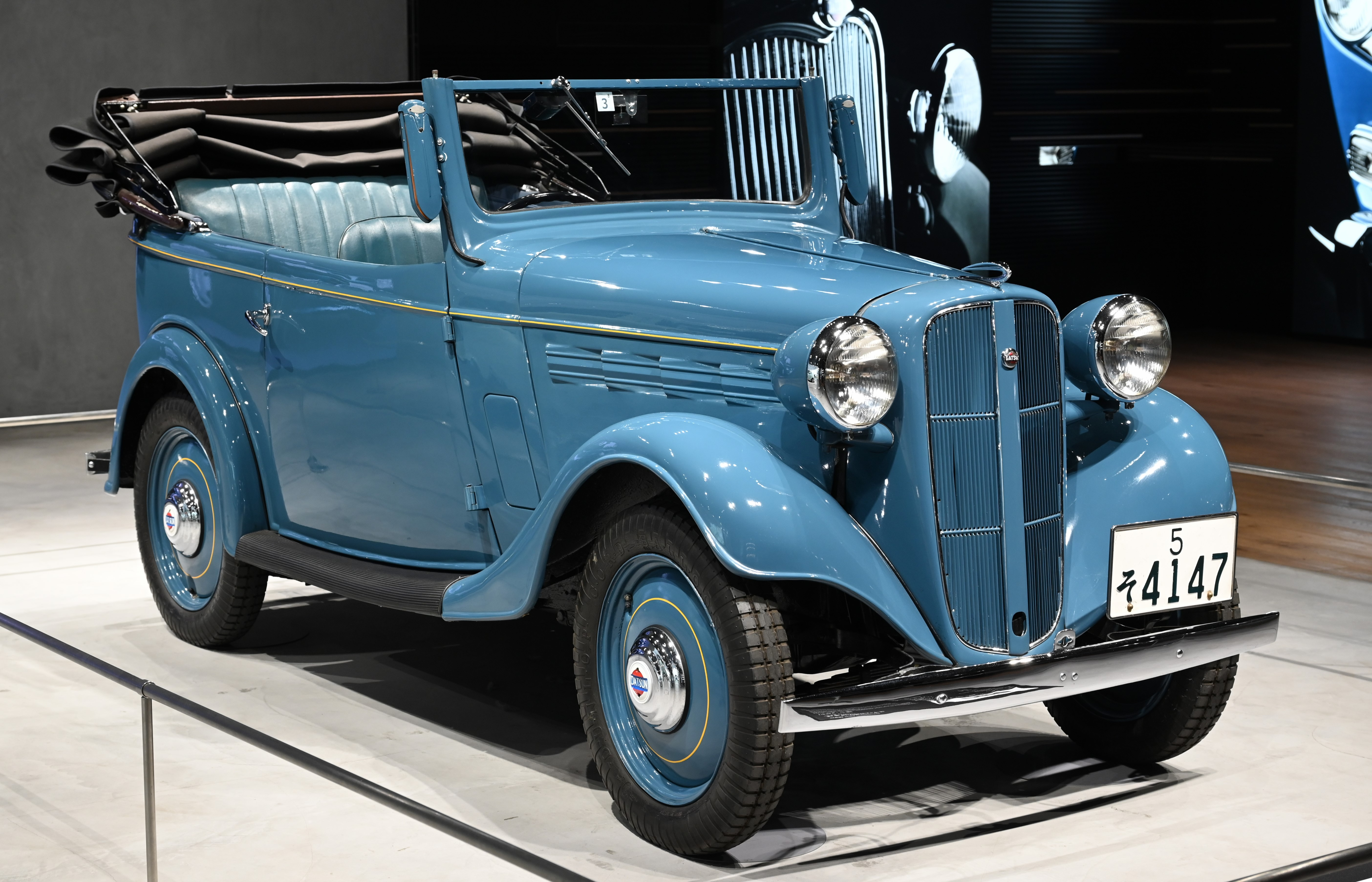
1938 Datsun Model 17

The last Datsun small car is the Datsun Type 17 which is distinguished by a wide vertical bar in middle of the front grille. Production began in April 1938 and according to Nissan, continued until January 1944, although David Bent claims that it finished in late 1938 as part of the cessation civilian car production that followed the Japanese decision to focus on military vehicles. The Datsun Type 17T resumed production after the Second Sino-Japanese War in 1949 until the 1955 introduction of the all new Datsun 120-series truck.

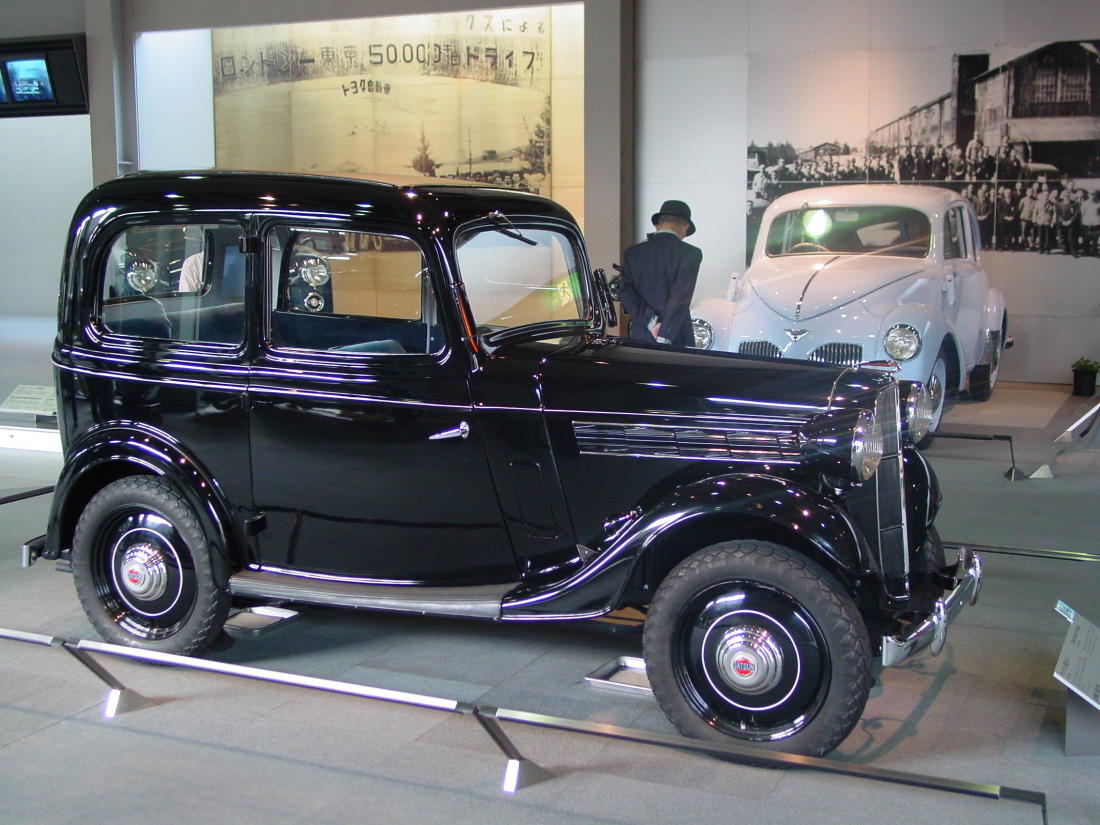
1937 Datsun Type 16 2-door sedan

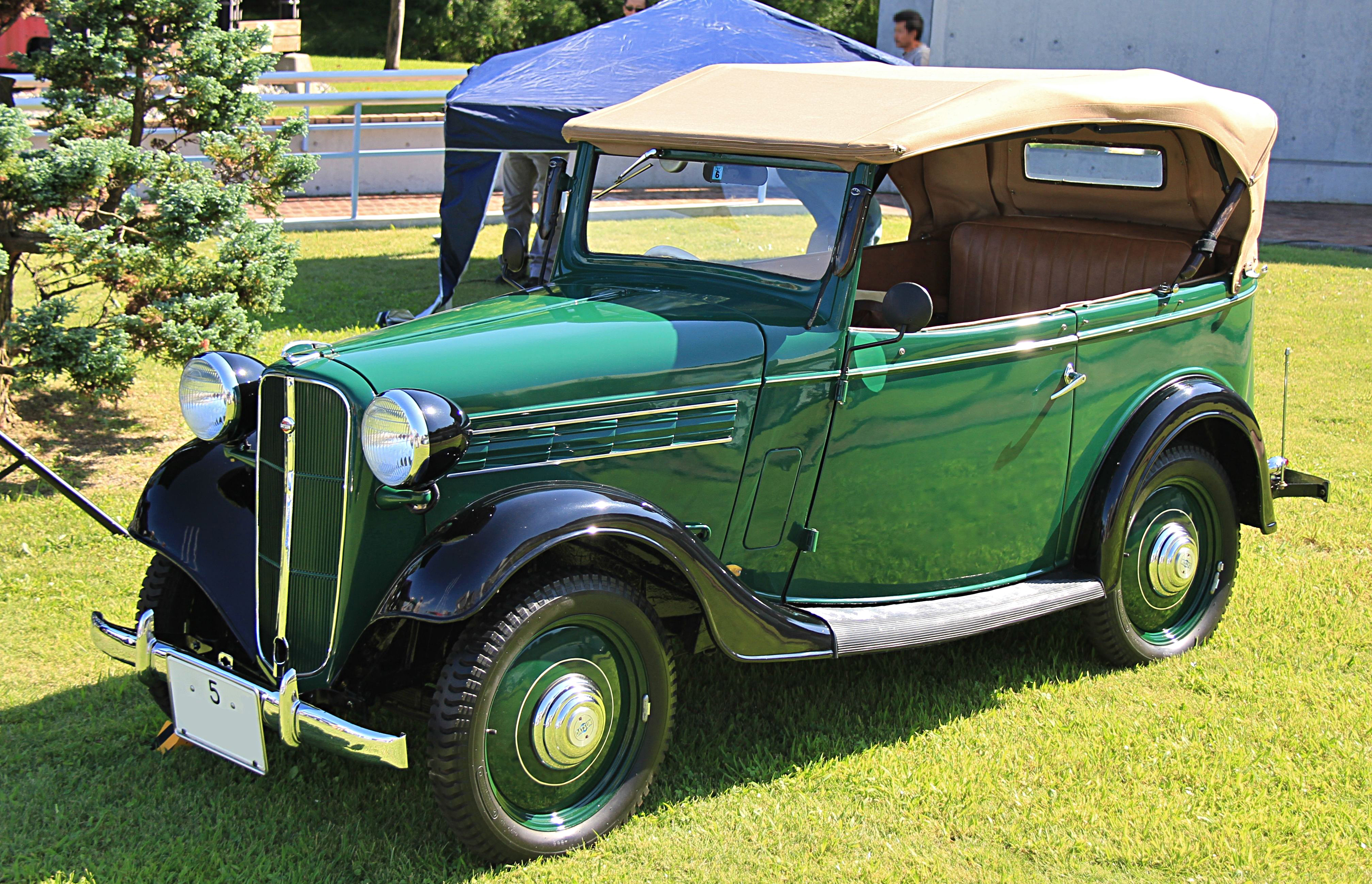
The Datsun Type 17 was the last pre-war Datsun small car

=== Datsun DA/DB/DC/DS/DW series ===
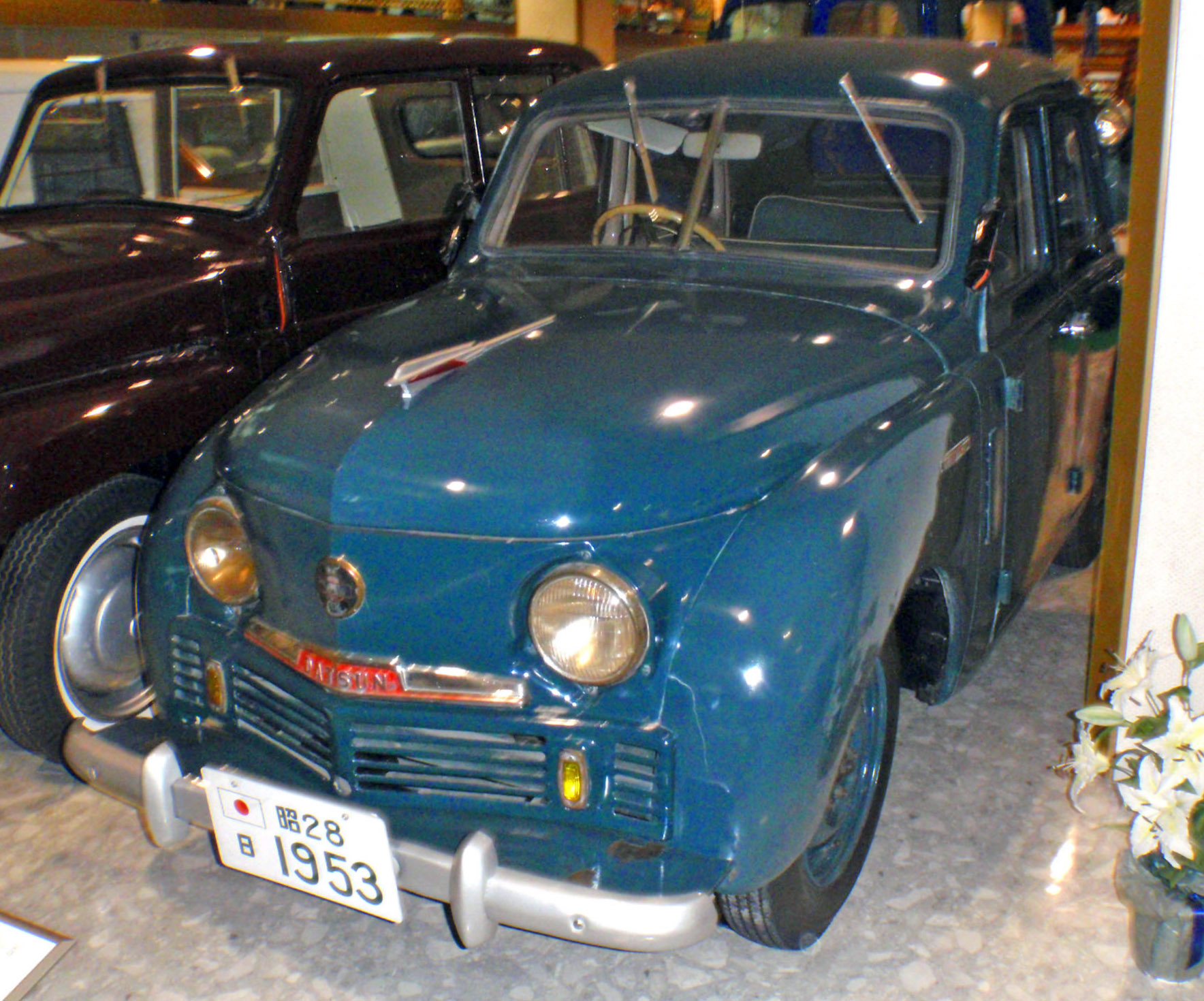
1953 Datsun DB-4

Nissan resumed automobile production starting in November 1947 with the Datsun DA series. The DA was a very modest and simple car based on the Type 17, with bodywork made partially of wood as a result of materials shortages. The better equipped and more modern looking DB "Deluxe" series was added in March 1948. Nissan also offered commercial vehicles, and the DA was sold as the Datsun 1121 truck, which was essentially the DA with a shortened cab for the front seat and an exposed cargo area attached to the chassis. An open-top roadster/convertible called the Datsun DC-3 appeared 12 January 1952, largely created by Yuichi Ohta. Yuichi was the son of Hiro Ohta, who founded the Ohta Jidosha car company, which produced cars in Japan between 1934 and 1957, until it became part of Tokyu Kogyo Kurogane shortly thereafter. The Datsun DS appeared in 1950, replacing the DA series as Datsun's Standard Sedan.

All of these models were built on the identical pre-war chassis, itself a copy of or at least heavily inspired by the Austin 7. The chassis is short and with a narrow tread, as is typical for inter-war British cars, leading to somewhat ungainly designs with large overhangs on all sides as Datsun attempted to incorporate the post-war automobile design language. The one major change took place in August 1951, when the wheelbase was increased from 2,005 to 2,150 mm (78.9 to 84.6 in) to accommodate a four-door body (or more cargo space in case of the trucks). The DA and DS (Standard) were the entry-level Datsuns, with the Deluxe DB being more modern and better equipped. In 1952 Nissan entered into an engineering cooperation with the British Austin Motor Company, and offered a Japanese-built Austin A40 as their top-of-the-line model.

== 110 series ==
Datsun 110/112/113
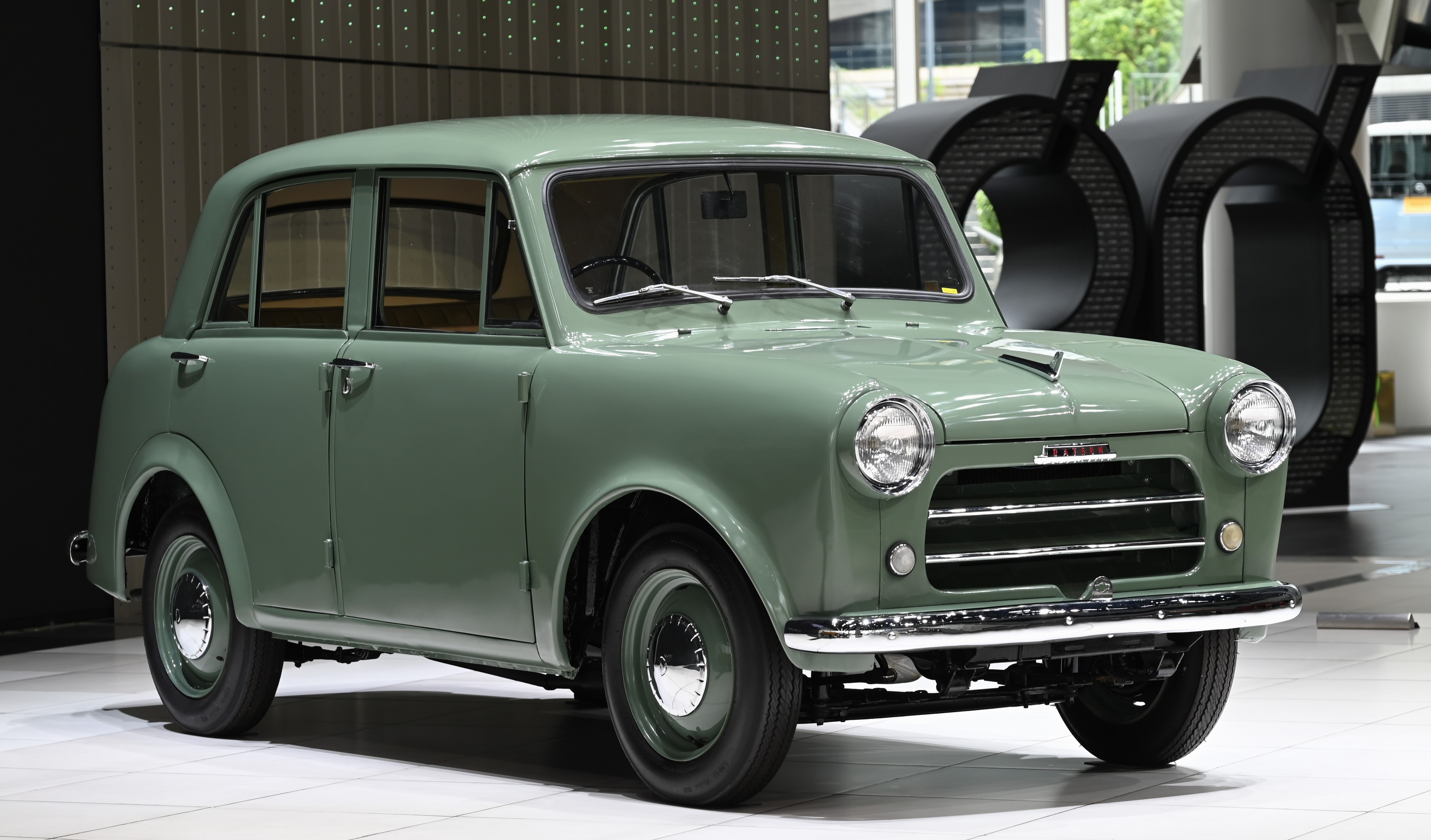
- 1955 Datsun 110

Overview
- Also called: Datsun 1000; Datsun Sedan
- Production: 1955–1957
- Assembly: Japan: Nissan Shatai, Hiratsuka, Kanagawa
- Designer: Shozo Sato

Body and chassis
- Class: compact
- Body style: 4-door sedan
- Layout: FR layout
- Related: Datsun Truck 120

Powertrain
- Engine: 860cc D10/B-1 SV I4
- Transmission: 4-speed manual

Dimensions
- Wheelbase: 2,220 mm (87.4 in)
- Length: 3,860 mm (152.0 in)
- Width: 1,466 mm (57.7 in)
- Height: 1,540 mm (60.6 in)
- Curb weight: 890 kg (1,960 lb)

In 1955 Nissan revamped its passenger car products, began with the Datsun Sedan 110 series. It was introduced to Japan within a month of the introduction of the Toyota Crown RS series, and was smaller than the Prince Sedan introduced earlier in 1952 and the Subaru 1500 introduced in 1955. Sedans built in Japan during the 1950s were mostly intended to serve as taxis, and introduced mass production techniques, as opposed to earlier vehicles made using a slower hand-made process. The design, by Nissan's head of design Shozo Sato, won the Mainichi Shimbun's 1956 prize for Industrial Design.

This sedan was designed to be compliant with the Japanese Government's dimension regulations passed in 1950. The engine displacement was kept below the 1000 cc designation to reduce the annual road tax obligation, but more importantly, the engine displaced less than 910 cc as this was the upper limit for small taxis. Nissan did have an engineering relationship with the Austin Motor Company.

The Datsun 110 series used the Nissan D10 type engine based on an original (albeit Austin 7 inspired) design from before World War II. The engine is a water-cooled inline-four cylinder with two crankshaft bearings, side intake and exhaust valves, a displacement of 860 cc and with 25 PS (18 kW) at 4000 rpm. Aside from not using the name, the A110 is the direct forerunner of the modern Bluebird line. Incremental changes were denoted by 112 and 113 codes – the 111 designation was skipped. The last model, introduced in June 1956, received an all-new, developed in-house gearbox. The earlier 110 and 112 had been using the four-speed, floor-mounted transmission from the Austin A40 Somerset (then built under license by Nissan), but the new 113 received a column-shifted four-speed unit which narrowly allowed seating for three in front. The new unit was also 10 kilograms (22 lb) lighter than the Austin one. Both units received synchronization on the top three gears only, as was the norm for the time.

The 110 series was available as a sedan or as the rare W110/112/113 station wagon, which had a horizontally split tail gate. There was also a K110 listed, a two-door cabrio coach version. Based on the 110 was the stronger duty 120 series (intended for commercial usage), also available as a two-door delivery van, as a double cab truck, or as a two-seater pickup truck – part of the Datsun truck lineage. The 110 series' body was manufactured by Nissan Motor Kantō, using steel from Mitsubishi Heavy Industries.

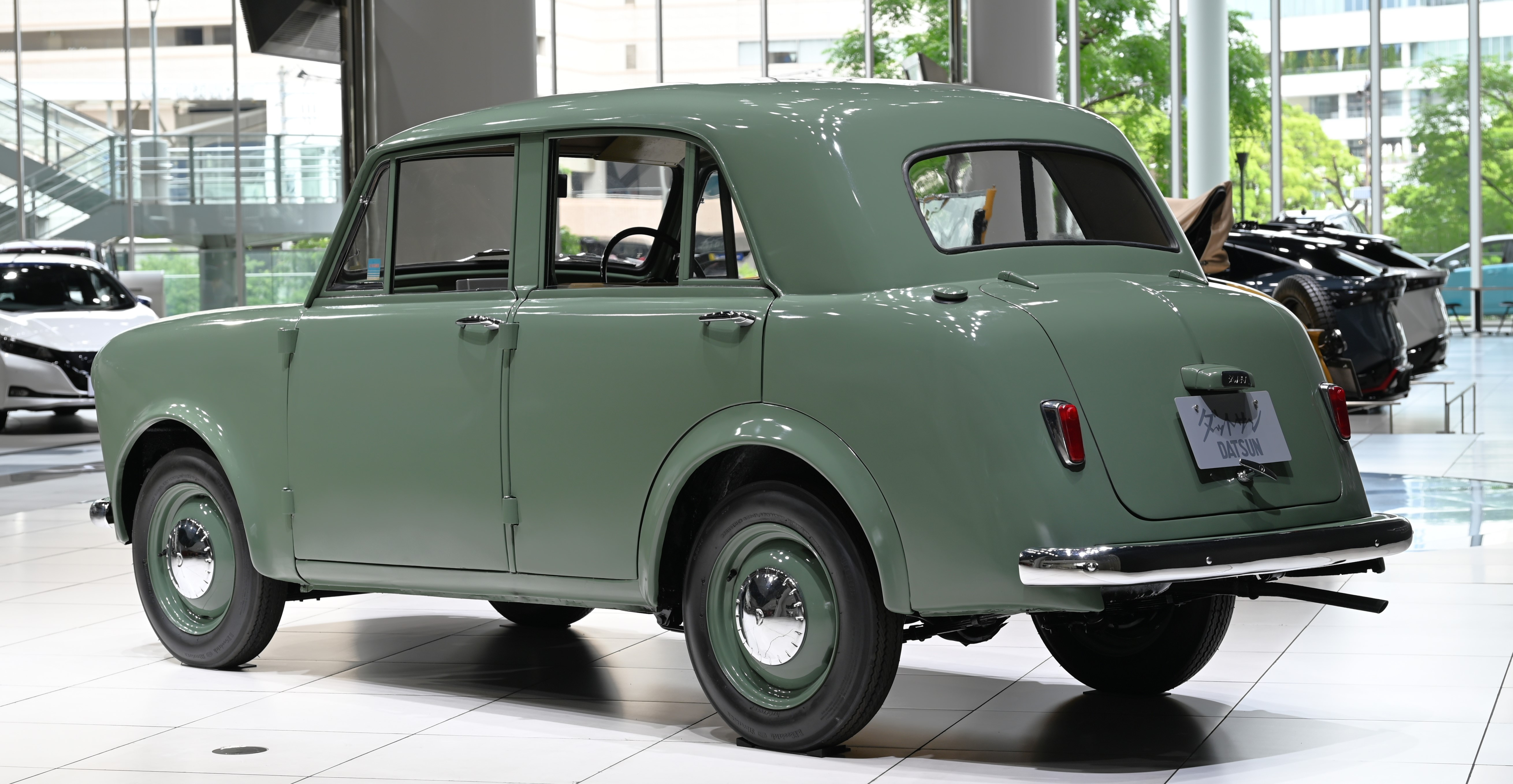
Rear view (110)

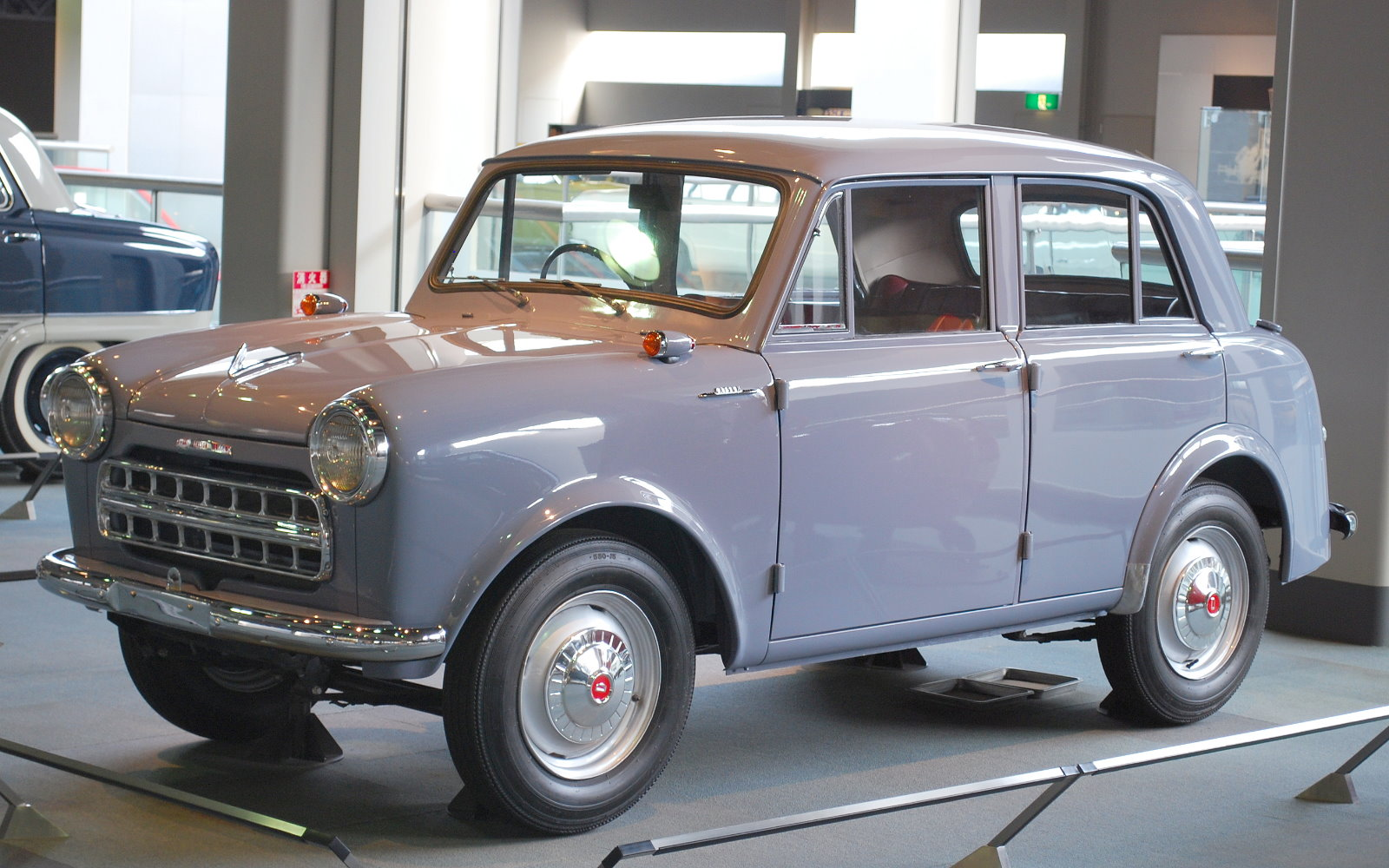
1955 Datsun 112

== 210/211 series ==
Datsun 210/211
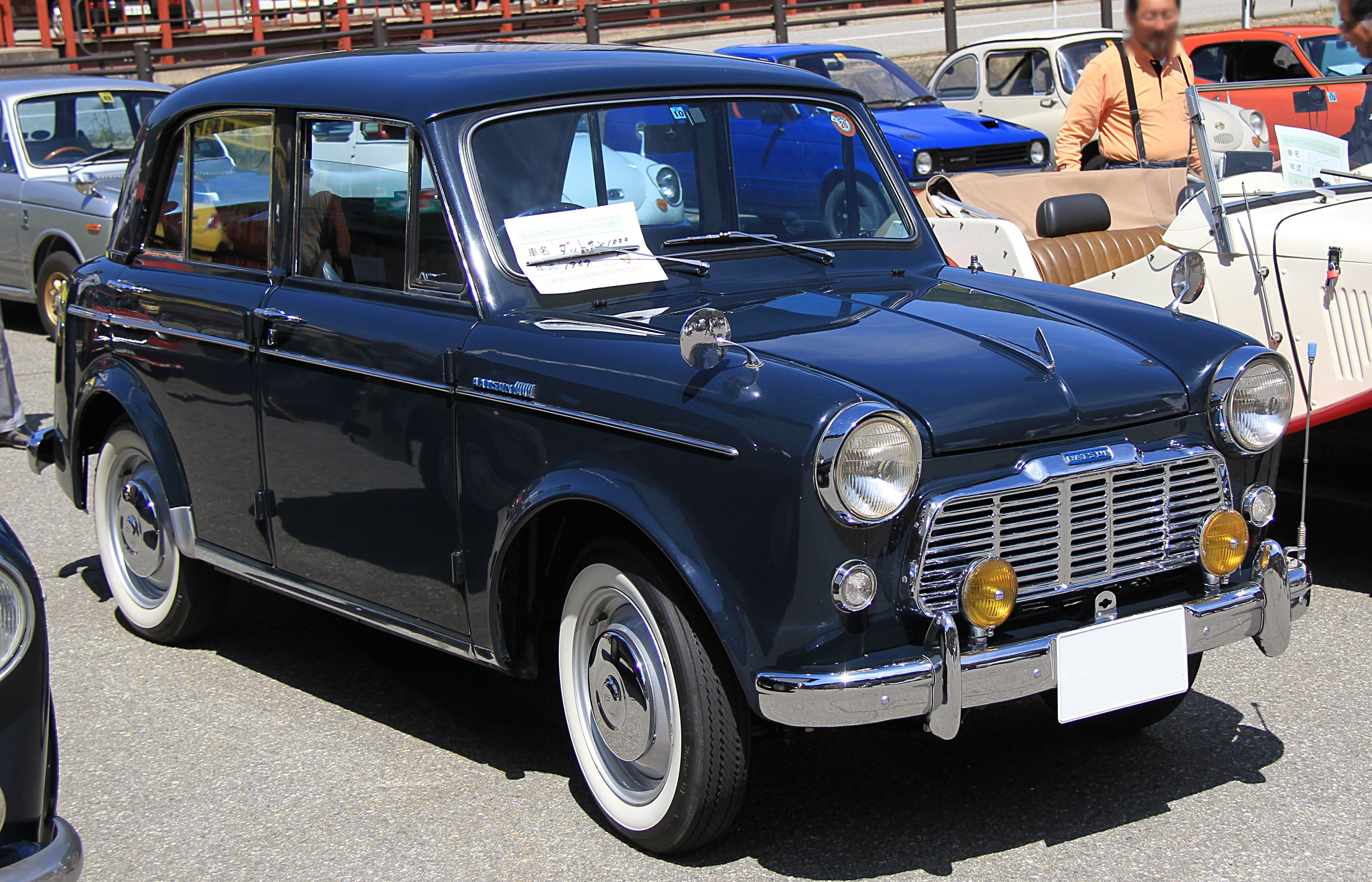
- 1959 Datsun 1000 (211)

Overview
- Also called: Datsun 1000; Datsun 1200
- Production: October 1957 – July 1959
- Assembly: Japan: Nissan Shatai, Hiratsuka, Kanagawa

Body and chassis
- Class: compact
- Body style: 4-door sedan
- Layout: FR layout
- Related: Datsun Sports S211; Datsun Truck 220

Powertrain
- Engine: 860 cc D10/B-1 SV I4 (114/115); 988 cc C OHV I4 (210/211); 1189 cc E OHV I4 (P211)
- Transmission: 4-speed manual

Dimensions
- Wheelbase: 2,220 mm (87.4 in)
- Length: 3,860 mm (152.0 in)
- Width: 1,466 mm (57.7 in)
- Height: 1,535 mm (60.4 in)
- Curb weight: 925 kg (2,039 lb) max

Although Nissan's own materials indicate that the Bluebird name emerged in 1959, some records show that the name first adorned a 988 cc (60.3 cu in), 34 PS (25 kW) four-door sedan in 1957, which was part of the company's 110/210 series. Its engine was based on an Austin design, as Nissan had been building the Austin A50 Cambridge under licence in the 1950s.

The 210 was known for doubling Nissan's production at the time and was the first Nissan to be exported to the United States. In some markets, this model was exported as the Datsun 1000. It was the first passenger car to be built in Taiwan, by the fledgling Yue Loong works, as the 1960 YLN 701 Bluebird. The 210 established an early reputation for reliability, with two of them winning the 1000 cc class in the 1958 Australia Mobilgas Rally, competing against the first generation Toyota Crown.

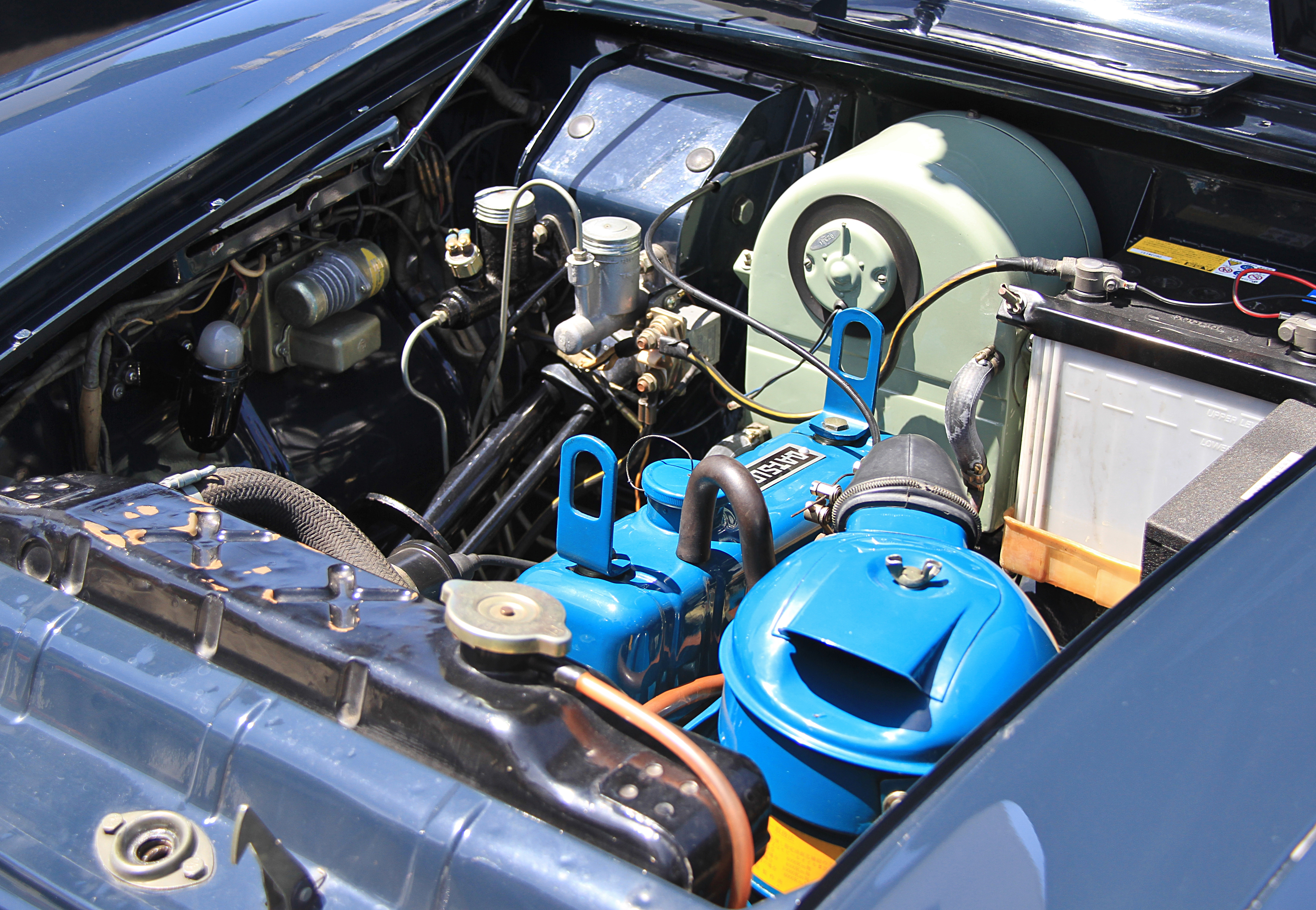
1959 Datsun 1000 211 engine

The 210 had succeeded the similar 110 series, which had been on sale since two years earlier. The Datsun 114 was introduced in October 1957 as a low cost option to the 210, mainly intended for taxi use. The 114 used the 210's body except for the grille and exterior trim, combined with the old 25 PS "D10" engine to stay beneath the 910 cc limit imposed by the government on small taxis. Nissan did consider manufacturing a 908 cc version of the new C engine but in the end chose to keep the old sidevalve unit in production instead. The 114 was succeeded by the Datsun 115, a corresponding lower specification version of the updated 211, which was similar to the 114/210 with the exception of a bigger rear window and slightly redesigned front turn signals. Thanks to some improvements, the 115's engine now produced 27 PS (20 kW) and it was called the "B-1" engine to reflect its new overhead valve architecture. Small engine displacements also helped to keep the vehicle affordable, as the Japanese Government began to impose an annual road tax to help develop and maintain a national transportation infrastructure in 1950.

Subsequent models included the 211 (October 1958) which featured cosmetic changes, including twin taillights, a larger rear window, and chrome trim that extended to the rear fender. Power was increased somewhat, now up to 37 PS (27 kW) at 4600 rpm. For export markets, mainly the United States and Australia, there was also a bigger engined version available. "P211" in internal parlance, it was marketed simply as the "Datsun 1200". It has the "E" engine which produces 48 PS (35 kW) at 4800 rpm. There was also the 220-series of small trucks based on the 210.

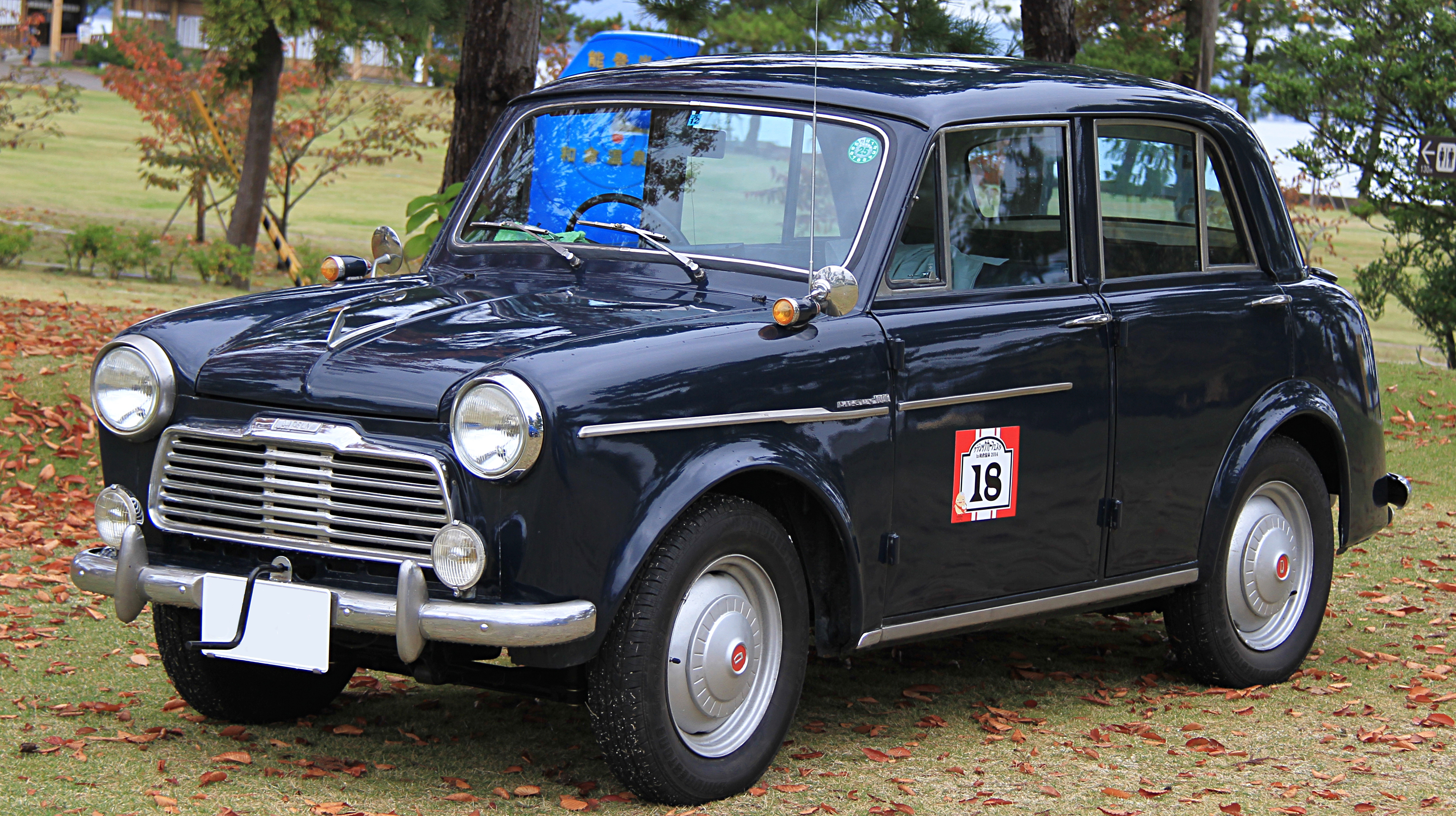
1958 Datsun 1000 (210)

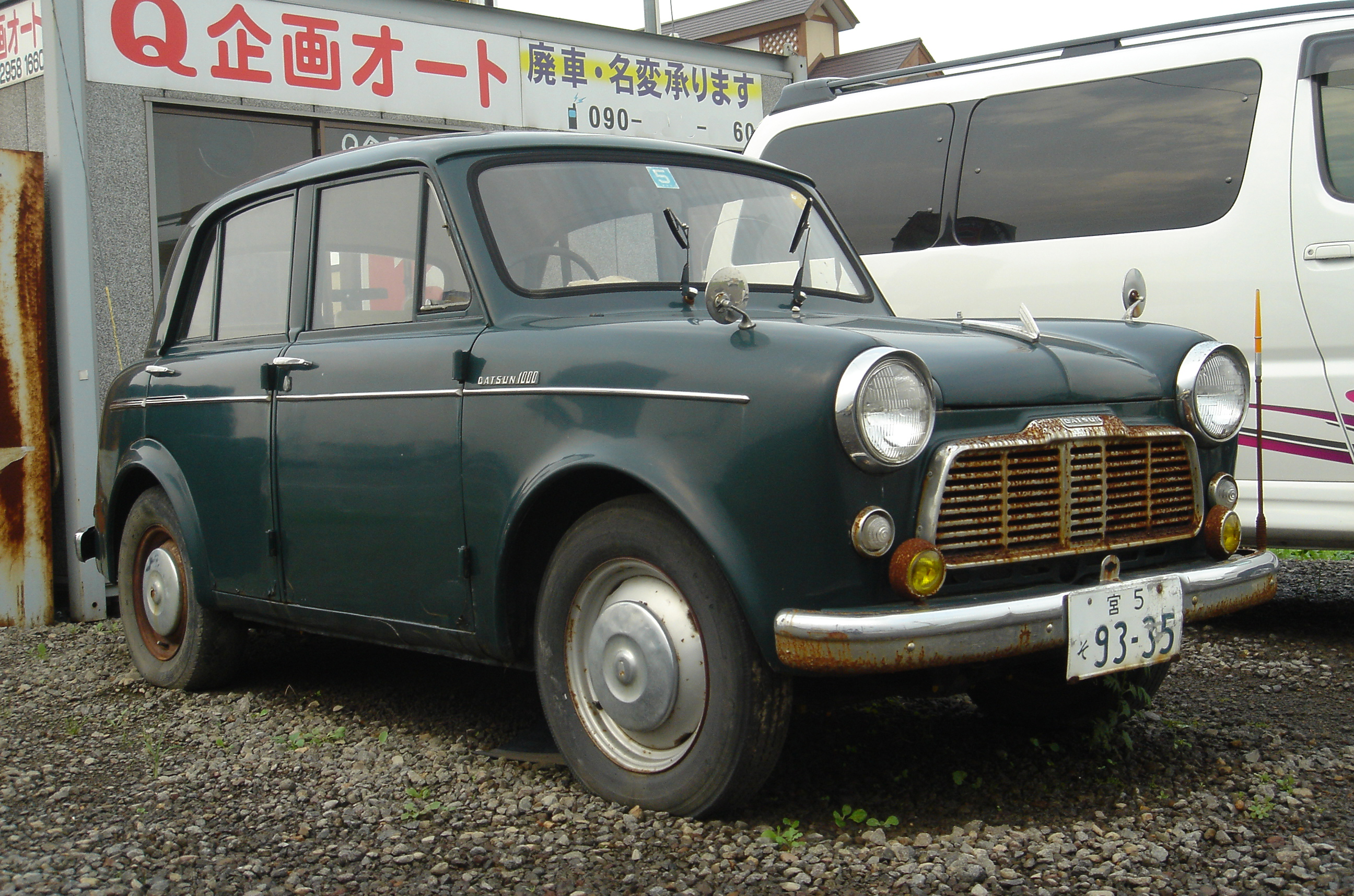
1959 Datsun 1000 (211)

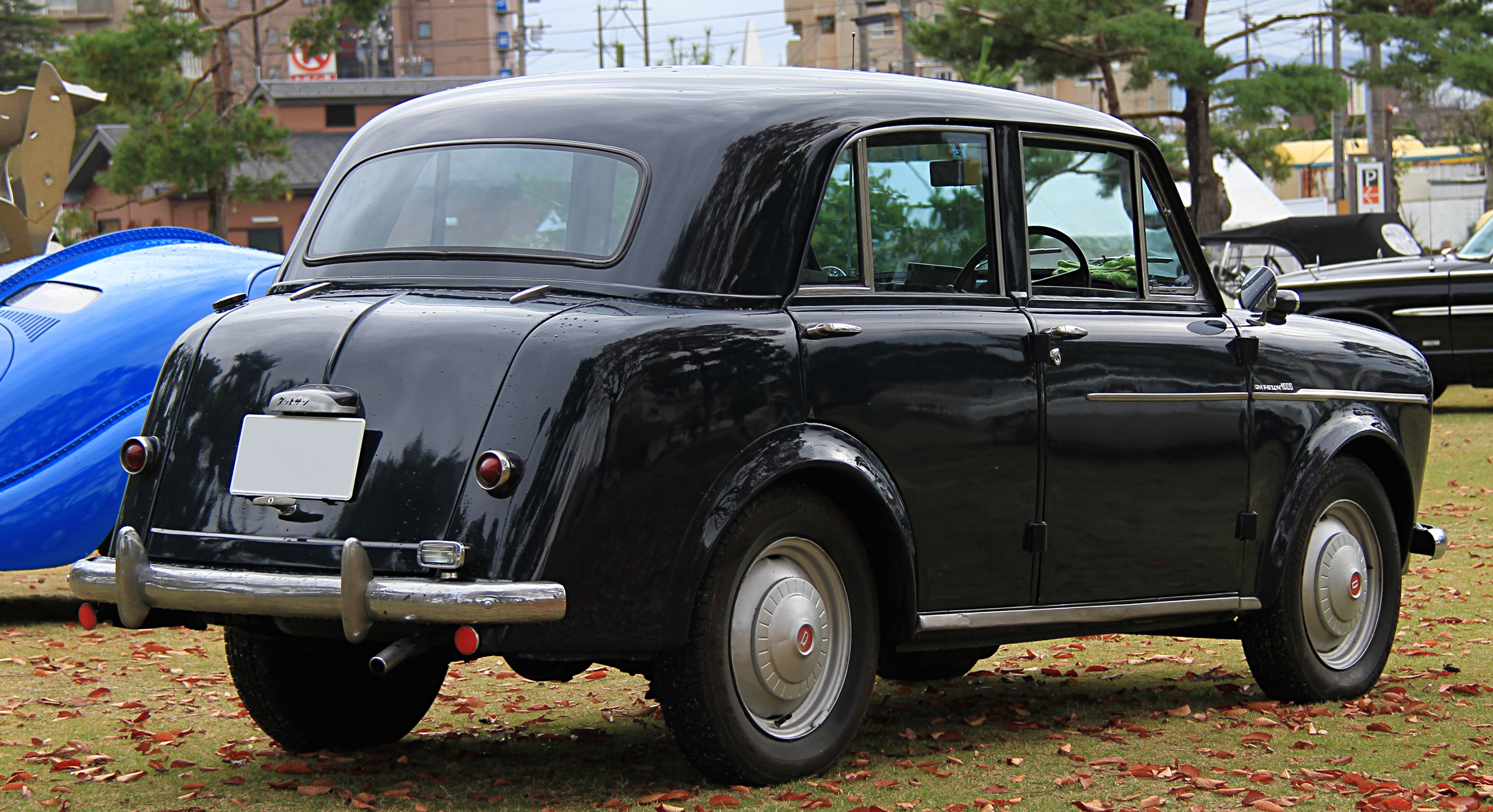
1958 Datsun 1000 rear view

== 310/311/312 series ==
Datsun Bluebird 310
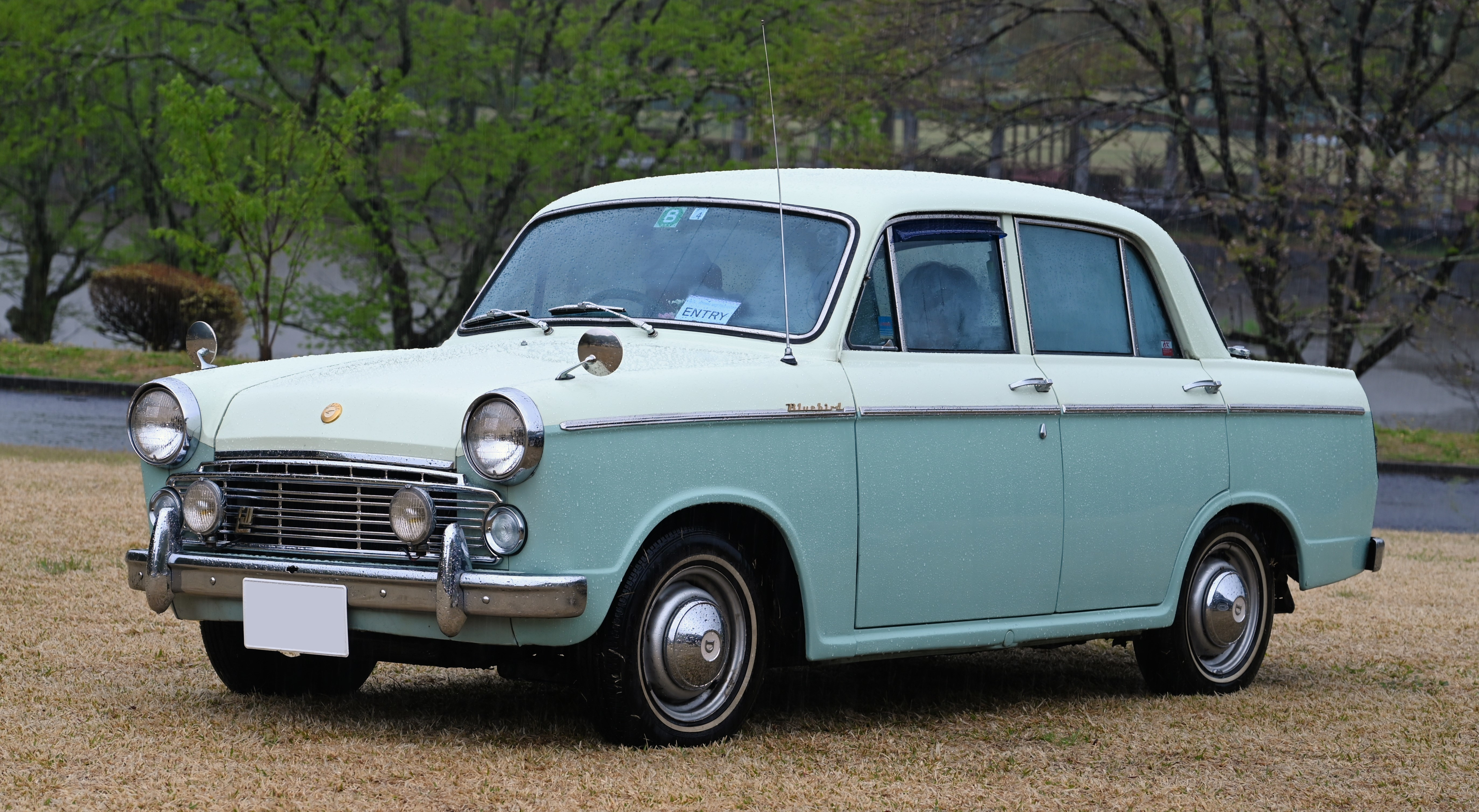

Overview
- Also called: Saenara Bluebird (South Korea: 1962–1963); Shinjin Shinsungho (South Korea: 1963–1965); Yue Loong Bluebird 704 (Taiwan)
- Production: August 1959 – September 1963 (Japan); July 1962 – November 1963 (South Korea, Saenara Motor); November 1963 – August 1965 (South Korea, Shinjin Motor)
- Assembly: Japan: Nissan Shatai, Hiratsuka, Kanagawa; New Zealand: Auckland; South Africa: Rosslyn; South Korea: Bupyeong-gu (Saenara/Shinjin); Taiwan: Taipei County (Yulon)

Body and chassis
- Body style: 4-door sedan; 5-door station wagon
- Layout: FR layout
- Related: Datsun Truck 320; Datsun Fairlady SP310; Nissan Cedric 30; Nissan Silvia CSP311

Powertrain
- Engine: 1.0 L C I4; 1.0 L C-1 I4; 1.2 L E I4; 1.2 L E-1 I4
- Transmission: 3-speed manual (fully synchronized for 1961)

Dimensions
- Wheelbase: 2,280 mm (89.8 in)
- Length: 3,915 mm (154.1 in)
- Width: 1,496 mm (58.9 in)
- Height: 1,470 mm (57.9 in)
- Curb weight: 900 kg (2,000 lb)

The Datsun Bluebird, which debuted in August 1959, was an all-new car and was available in Japan through the dealership sales channel Nissan Store. The 310 family was built from 1960 to 1963. Three models were built: 310 (1960), 311 (October 1960), and 312 (August 1961–1963). In Taiwan, it also replaced the 701 and was known as Yue Loong Bluebird 704. The Datsun 312 was also assembled in Korea. The 310 series was also built in South Africa at a factory in Rosslyn, Pretoria, in CKD form during 1962 and 1963. The model was also sold in New Zealand and was one of the first Japanese models available there, beginning in May 1962.

In October 1959, two months after introduction, a five-seater model was introduced - Japan's first post-war, five-seater automobile. In July 1960, a five-door station wagon was added (WP310), the first station wagon to enter series production in Japan. The P310 was powered by the overhead valve 1.2-litre Nissan E engine. A smaller-engine version (simply called "310") was powered by the 1.0 L Nissan C engine. The P311 and P312 (powered by the 55 hp 1.2 L Nissan E-1 engine) also had smaller-engined versions ("311" and "312") that were powered by the 45 hp 1.0 L Nissan C-1 engine. The 310 family were all equipped with a 3-speed manual transmission (fully synchronized for the 311 and 312). The station wagon was also available for the 311 and 312, although a three-speed automatic was added to the lineup in April 1962, near the end of the 310's run. The 312 was also available in a deluxe version (DP312). A trim model called the "Fancy Deluxe" (model code DP311-L) was marketed for the female driver; it featured a pale yellow exterior, pale yellow/grey interior, high heel shoe holder under the dash, a vanity mirror on the back of the driver's side sun visor, a turn signal relay that played music, curtains, automatic clutch, and bigger mirrors. A Deluxe model arrived at the time the new, more powerful E-1 engine was introduced (October 1960).

The 311 and 312 were updated stylistically as well, with redesigned grilles, taillights, and interiors. The original model had small, half-moon shaped lights which garnered the car the nickname "persimmon seed"; these were replaced by larger, more squared off units with a separate, amber turn signal section.

Styling tended to mimic larger American cars. A very small number did make it to the United States. In the US, this generation was referred to as the Bluebird or simply Sedan. This generation of Bluebird became one of the first Japanese cars to be sold in significant numbers in Europe, after Finland fully opened its doors to automobile imports in mid-1962. 700 were brought in, and by the time the 410-series had arrived, Datsun had passed SAAB and Triumph in registrations. Although not very fast, the sturdy Datsun was well-suited to the rugged Finnish roads of the time.

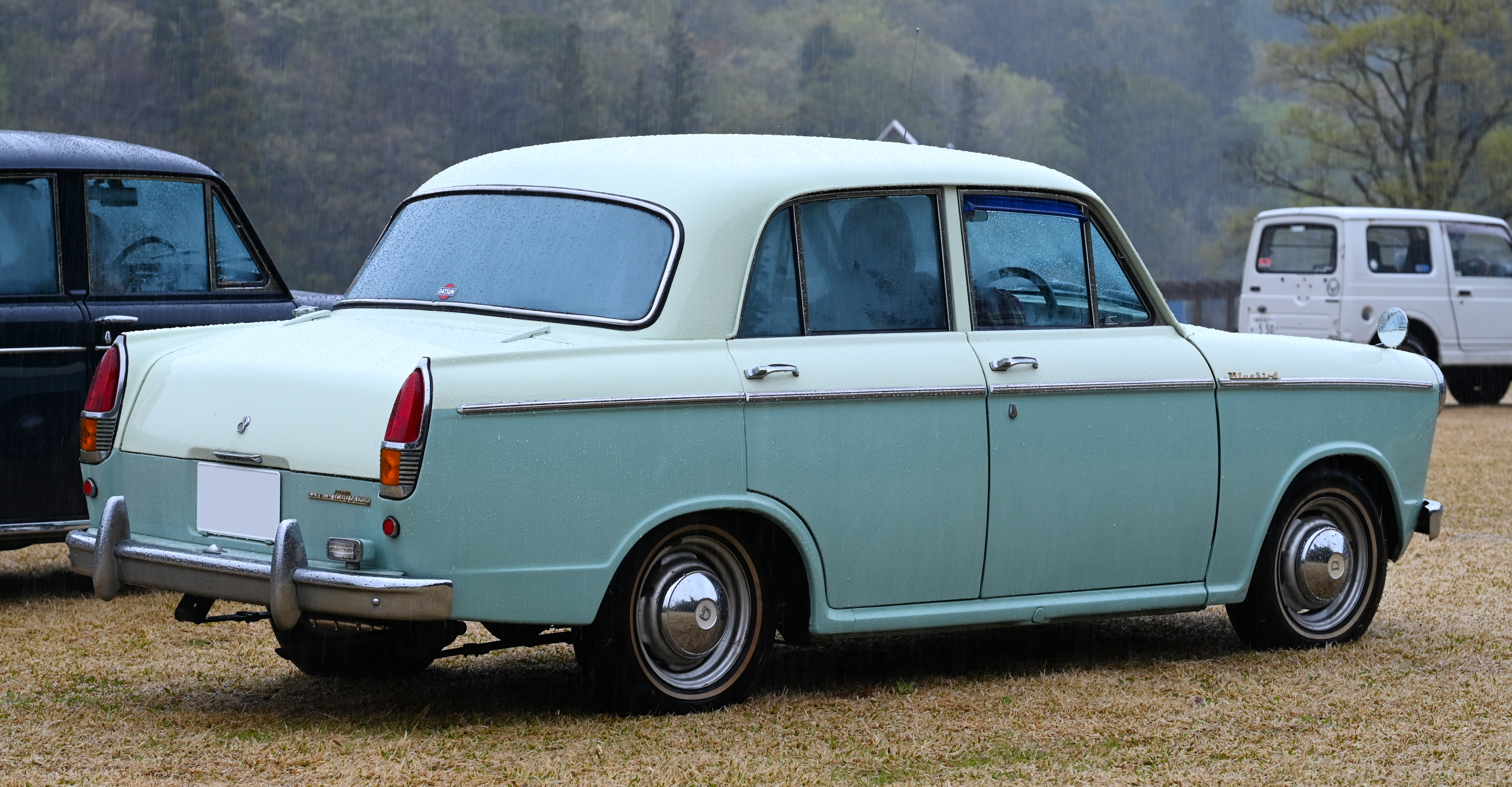
Datsun Bluebird sedan (DP311)

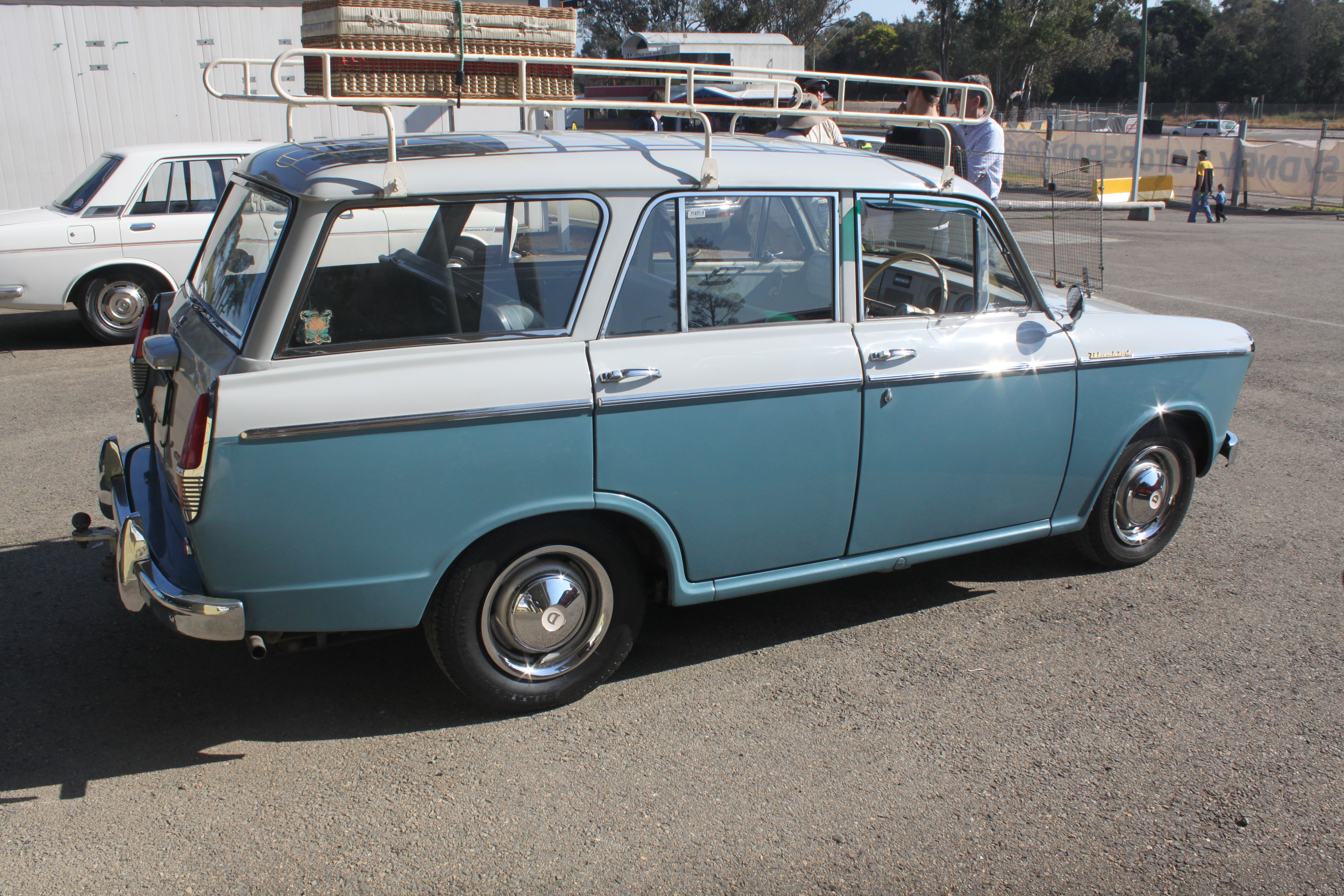
Datsun Bluebird station wagon (WP312)

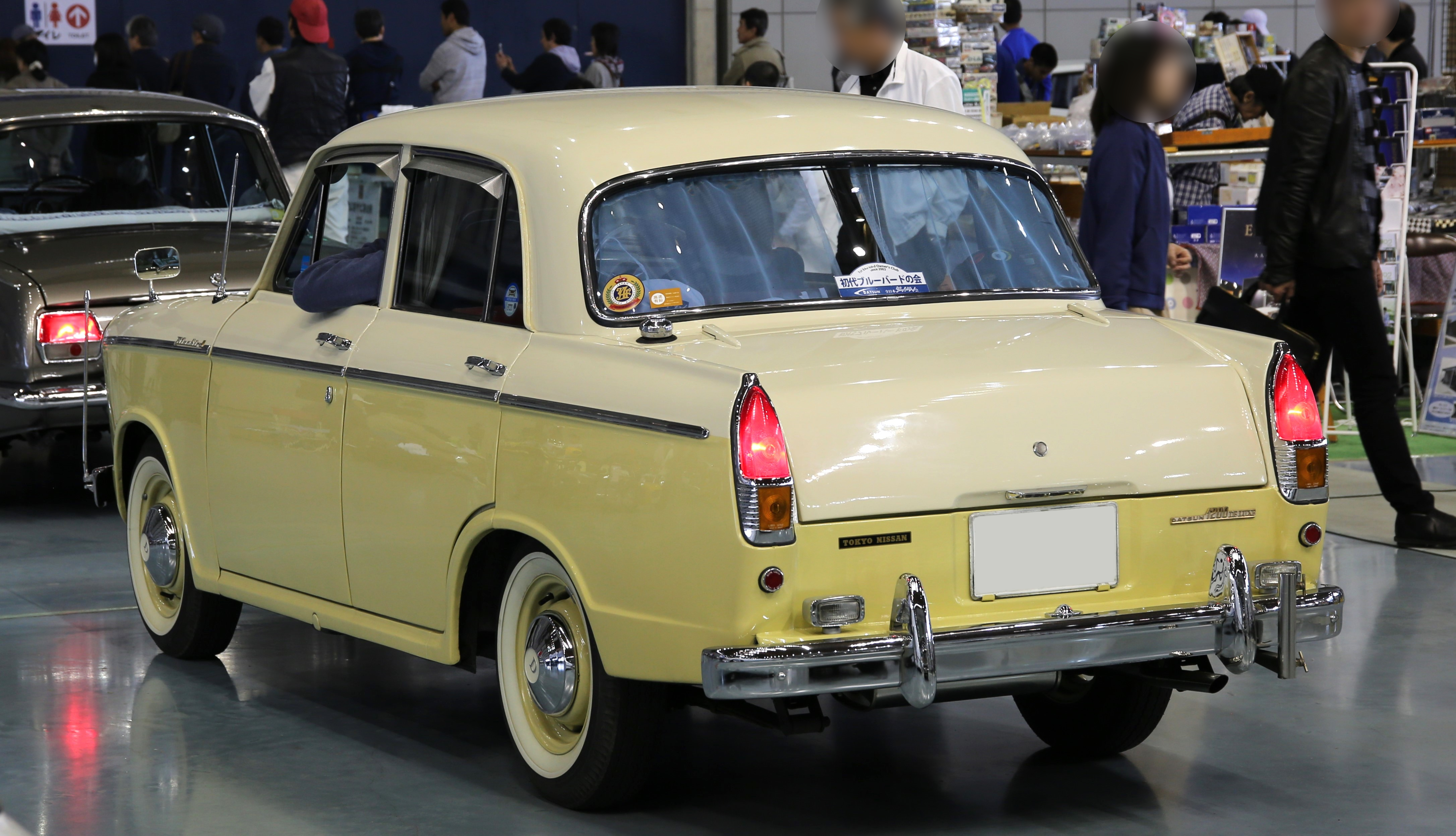
1963 Datsun Bluebird 1200 Fancy Deluxe (DP312-L)

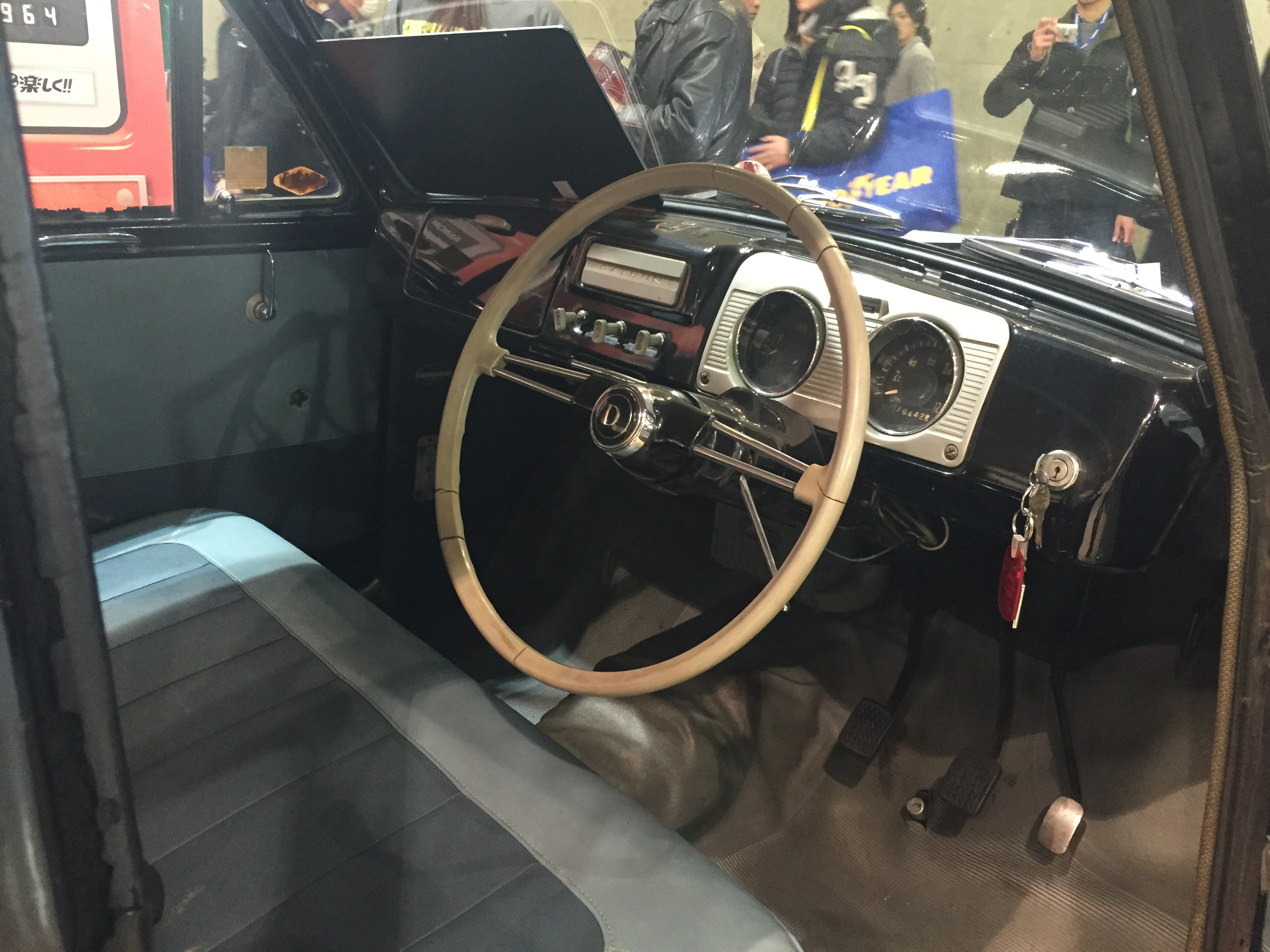
Datsun Bluebird 1200 interior (P310)

== 410/411 series ==
Datsun Bluebird 410
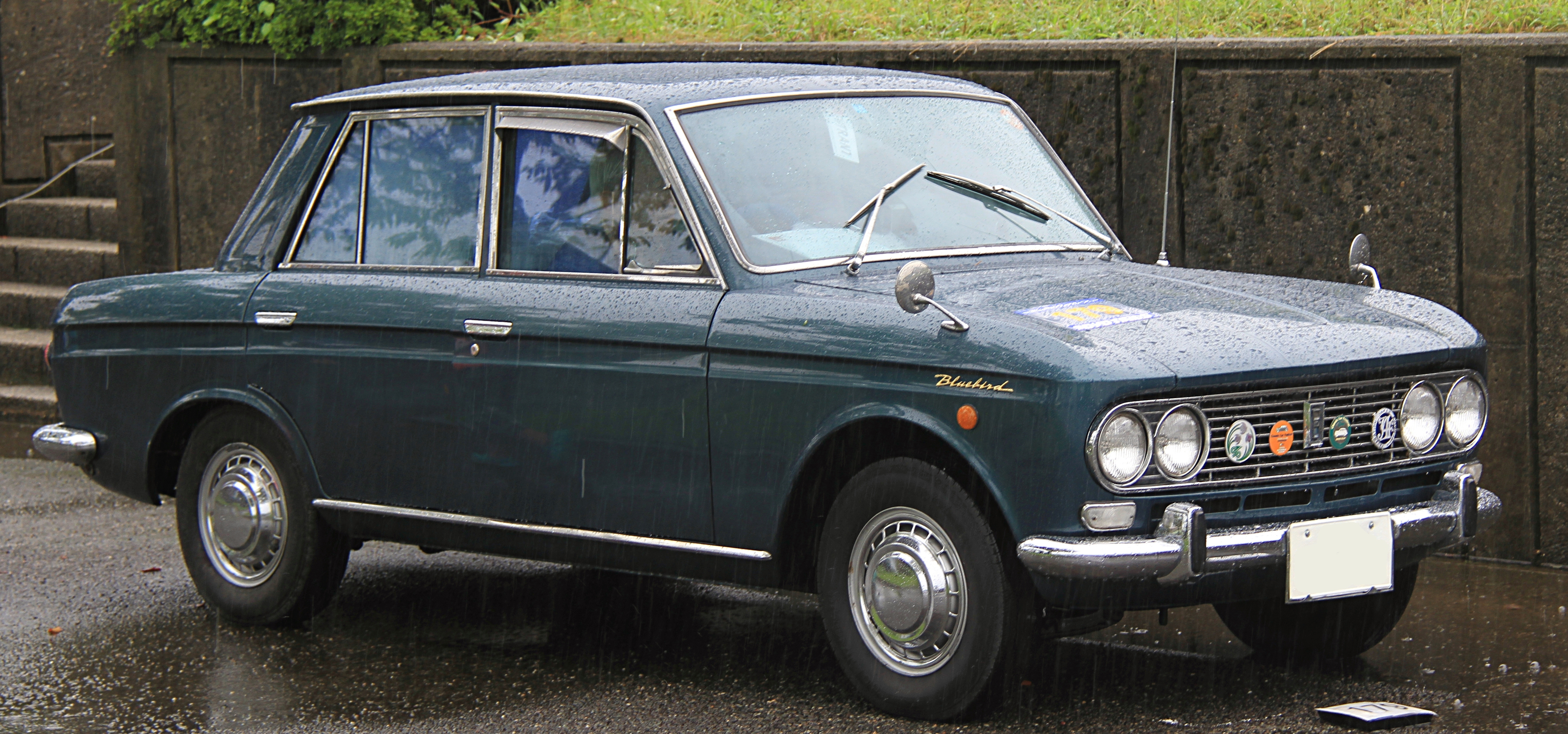

Overview
- Also called: Tan Chong 410; Yue Loong YLN-705 (Taiwan)
- Production: September 1963 – August 1967
- Assembly: Japan: Yokosuka, Kanagawa (Oppama plant); Australia: Sydney (Pressed Metal Corporation); Mexico: Cuernavaca (CIVAC plant); New Zealand: Auckland; South Africa: Rosslyn; Taiwan: Taipei County (Yulon)
- Designer: Pininfarina

Body and chassis
- Body style: 2/4-door sedan; 3-door light van; 5-door station wagon
- Layout: FR layout
- Related: Datsun Truck 520

Powertrain
- Engine: 1.0 L C-1 I4 (410); 1.2 L E-1 I4 (P410/411); 1.3 L J13 I4 (P411); 1.6 L R16 I4 (R411: SSS, US)
- Transmission: 3-speed column shift manual; 4-speed close ratio floor shift manual

Dimensions
- Wheelbase: 2,380 mm (93.7 in)
- Length: 3,995 mm (157.3 in)
- Width: 1,490 mm (58.7 in)
- Height: 1,415 mm (55.7 in)
- Curb weight: 915 kg (2,017 lb)

In September 1963, Nissan brought the Bluebird up-to-date with boxier styling (by Pininfarina), resembling European designs, particularly the Lancia Fulvia. The 410 was built from 1964 to 1967.

The lineup included five models: the 1200 Standard, 1200 Deluxe, Fancy Deluxe, and 1200 Wagon, equipped with the 1.2 L E-type engine, and a lower model equipped with the 1.0 L C-type engine.

This generation Bluebird was introduced in time for the 1964 Summer Olympics as Nissan wanted to offer an all new, modern appearance in time for the games. The 410 Bluebird was Nissan's first car of a full unibody design.

Two basic models were built: 410 (1963–1966) with a combination rear lamp set consisting of round and rectangular lenses, and 411 (1966–1967), which featured the same combination rear lamp set as the earlier 410 through 1966, changing to higher mounted rectangular tail light sets for 1967. On both, the rear direction indicators were red or amber, according to market – New Zealand, which allows either, took the 410 with both and the 411 with red only. This Bluebird was one of the first Japanese car lines assembled in New Zealand, initially imported under a tariff/duty arrangement allowing 300 cars a year (the so-called '300 Club') with CKD kits built up by Motor Holdings at Mount Wellington in Auckland. The 410 series sedan and station wagon plus a light delivery van was assembled in South Africa at a factory in Rosslyn Pretoria. These cars were all in CKD format.

The 410 Bluebird was the first Nissan to be produced outside Japan, as part of the brand's global expansion. Approximately 10,510 units were produced as CKD kits built at CIVAC plant in Cuernavaca, Mexico.

A sporting model, the Bluebird SS, was launched in Japan in March 1964, with a tuned 1.2 L engine. The SS was originally available only in a four-door configuration (MTK), but a two-door (RTK) joined about a year later. Two versions of the SS were built: the DP410-MTK/RTK and the DP411-MTK/RTK. The DP410 was powered by a 71 PS (52 kW) version of the 1.2 L Nissan E-1 engine. The 78 PS (57 kW) double-carburetted version of the J13 powered the DP411. All SS models were equipped with a four-speed manual transmission.

Initially, only a four-door sedan and five-door station wagon were in the range, but a two-door was added in September 1964. The two-door SS was launched in February 1965. The 410 and 411 were also available in a deluxe version (DP410 and DP411). A "Fancy Deluxe" version was also available in the home market. A DP411 SSS was entered in motor sport by the Datsun factory in South Africa and was used as test car for Nissan Japan. A Datsun DP411 SSS was also entered in the 1964 Monte Carlo rally, where it was driven by a South African, Ewold van Bergen.

To minimize production costs for export, the windshield wipers used a pattern where the wipers started in the centre and wiped towards the edge of the windshield, instead of from the passenger side towards the driver.

In May 1965 the base engine was enlarged to a downtuned version of the 1.3 L unit already used in the 411-series SS, now with a single (twin-barrel) carb and developing 67 PS (49 kW) at 5,200 rpm. The transmission remained a three-speed. The SS was downtuned somewhat, now with 72 PS (53 kW) but still with the four-speed unit. More excitingly, a twin-carb 1.6 L SSS model was launched the same month, with no less than 90 PS (66 kW). This began a line of famous Nissans in Japan, with the Bluebird SSS a mainstay of the range until its deletion in 2001.

As usual, a pickup truck version was developed and sold in parallel. For some reason it broke with the earlier standard of simply changing the second digit of the chassis code to a "2", instead labelling it the 520. The commercial-use 520 further marked the divergence of Datsun's Bluebird and truck lines as it continued to be available until 1972. Later versions received a modernized front end, similar to the contemporary 510 Bluebird.

In the United States, only the four-door sedan and wagon were offered; the two-door was never available. The 1.6-litre, featuring the same R16 engine as the SP(L)311 Roadster, was only available in 1967. The 1.2 and 1.3 410 and 411 series' had a manual gearbox, while the 1.6-litre was available as either a manual or automatic. The cars were labeled DATSUN, with no mention of Bluebird either on the car or in the owner's manual.

In Taiwan the Bluebird 410 was built from 1964 to 1967 and sold as the Yue Loong YLN-705.

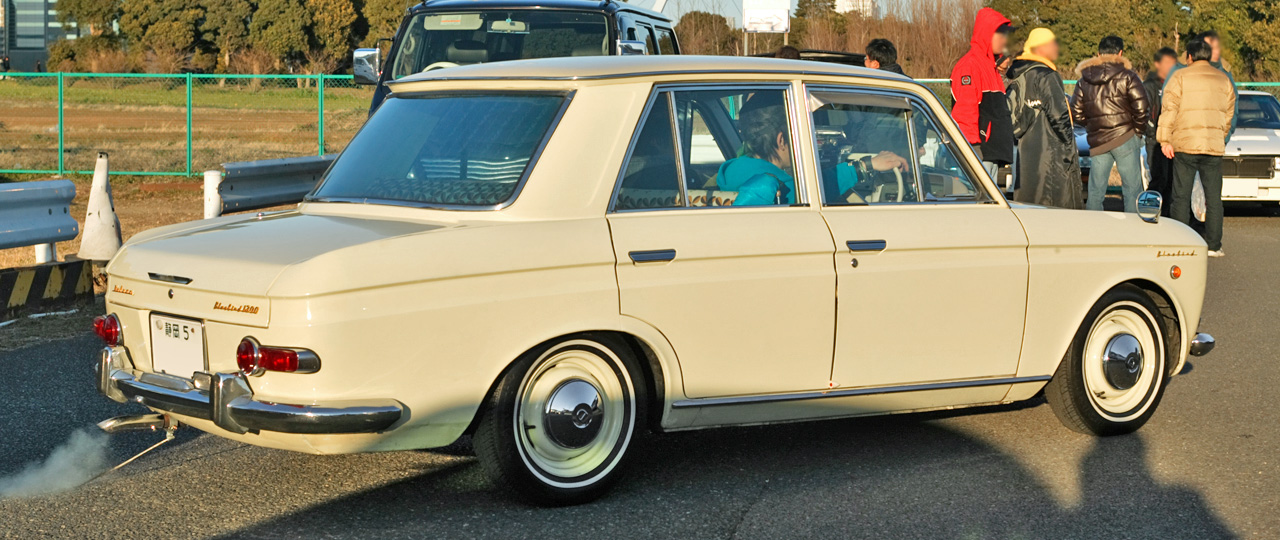
Rear view (410)

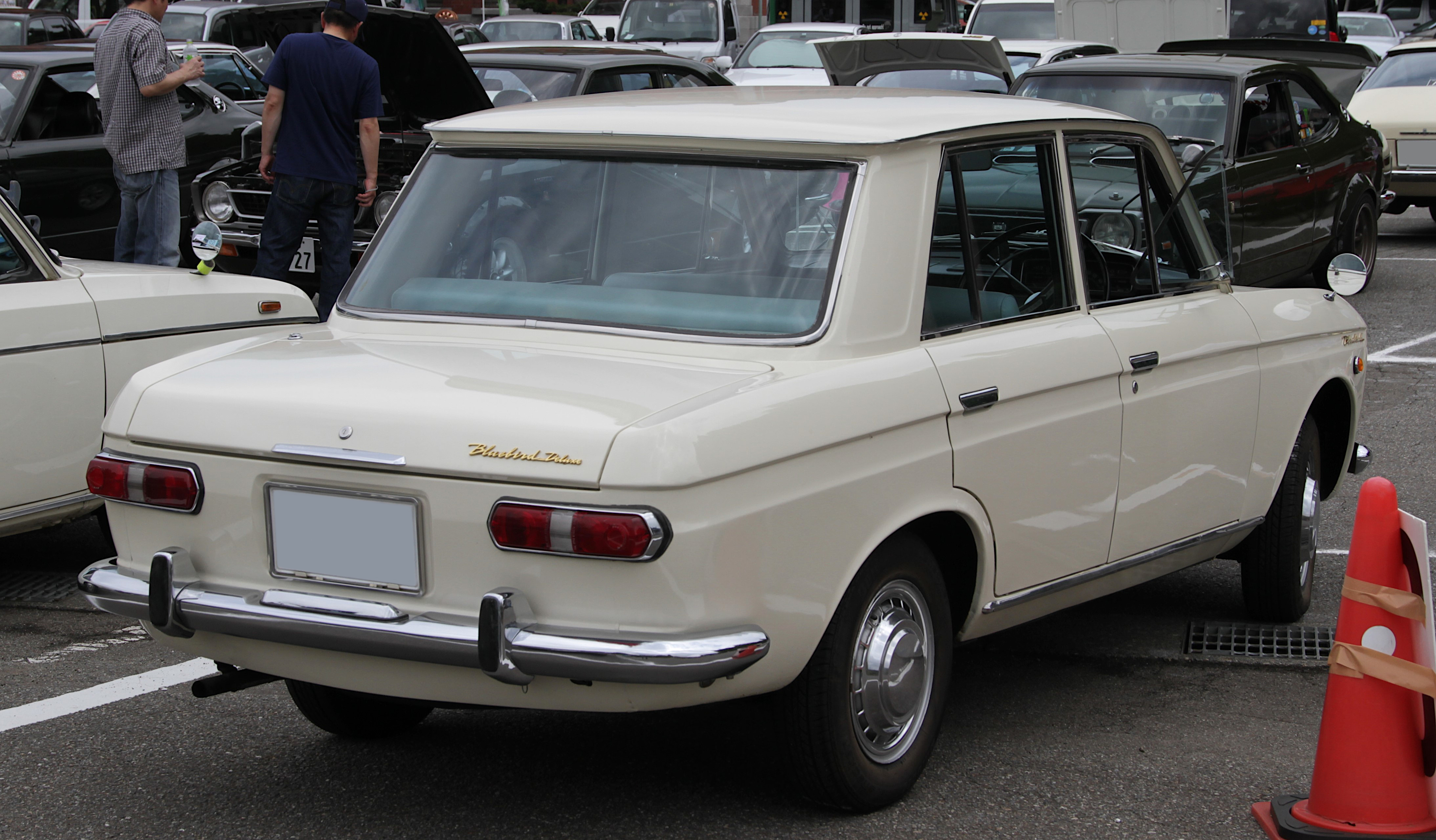
Rear view (411)

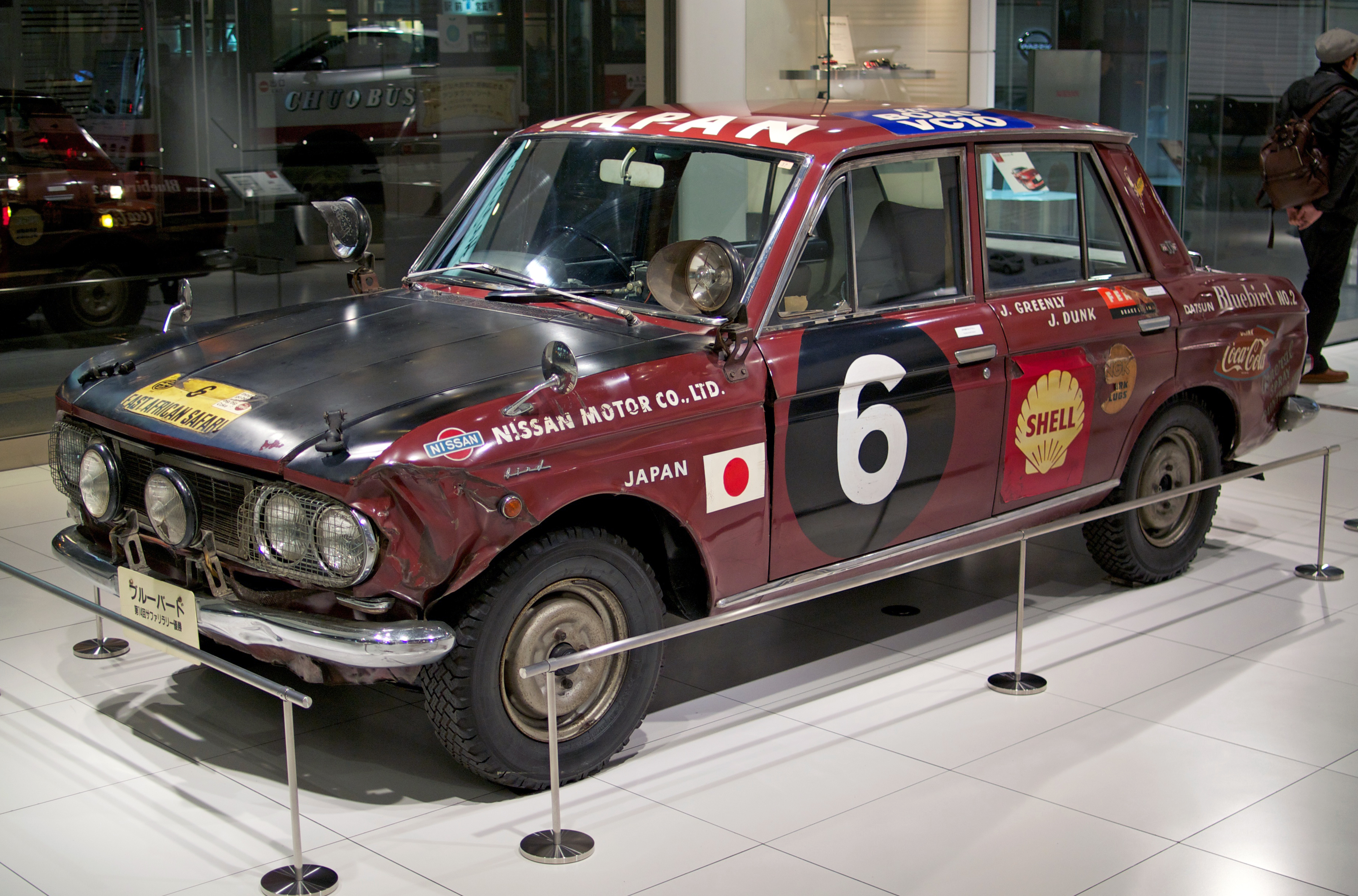
Datsun Bluebird SS units from the 1966 East African Safari Rally

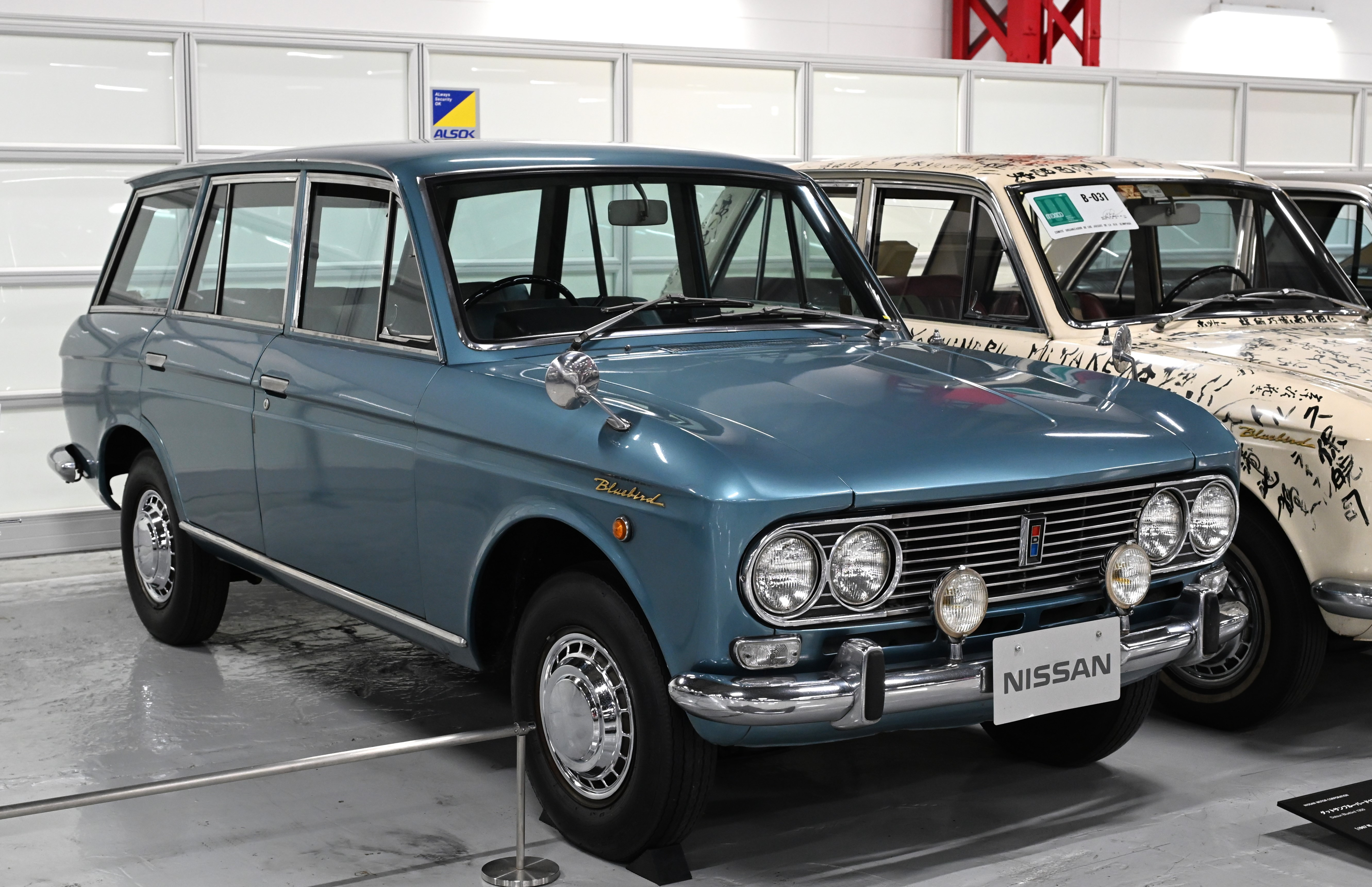
1967 Datsun Bluebird Wagon (Japan)

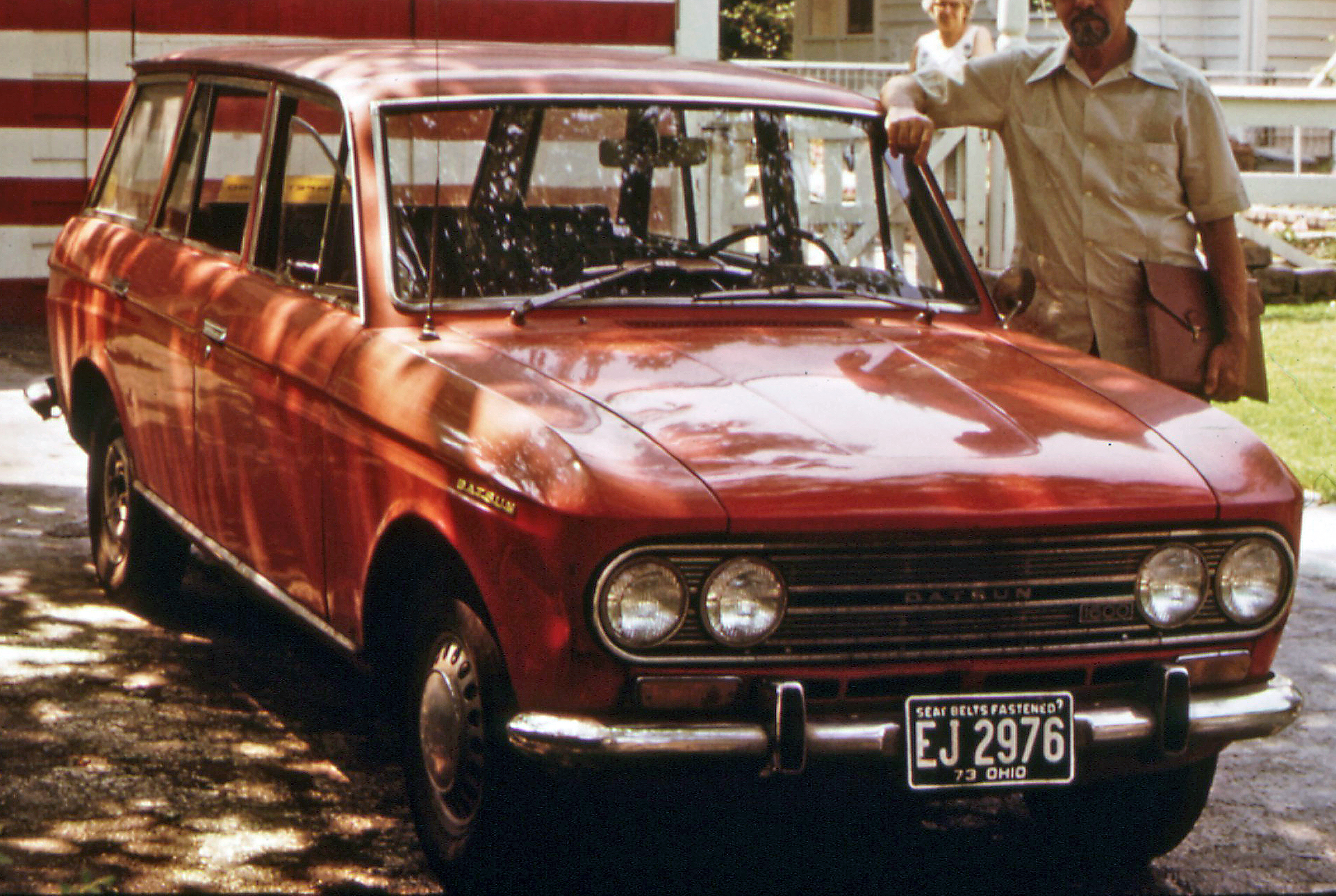
1967 Datsun 1600 Wagon (US)

== 510 series ==
Datsun Bluebird 510
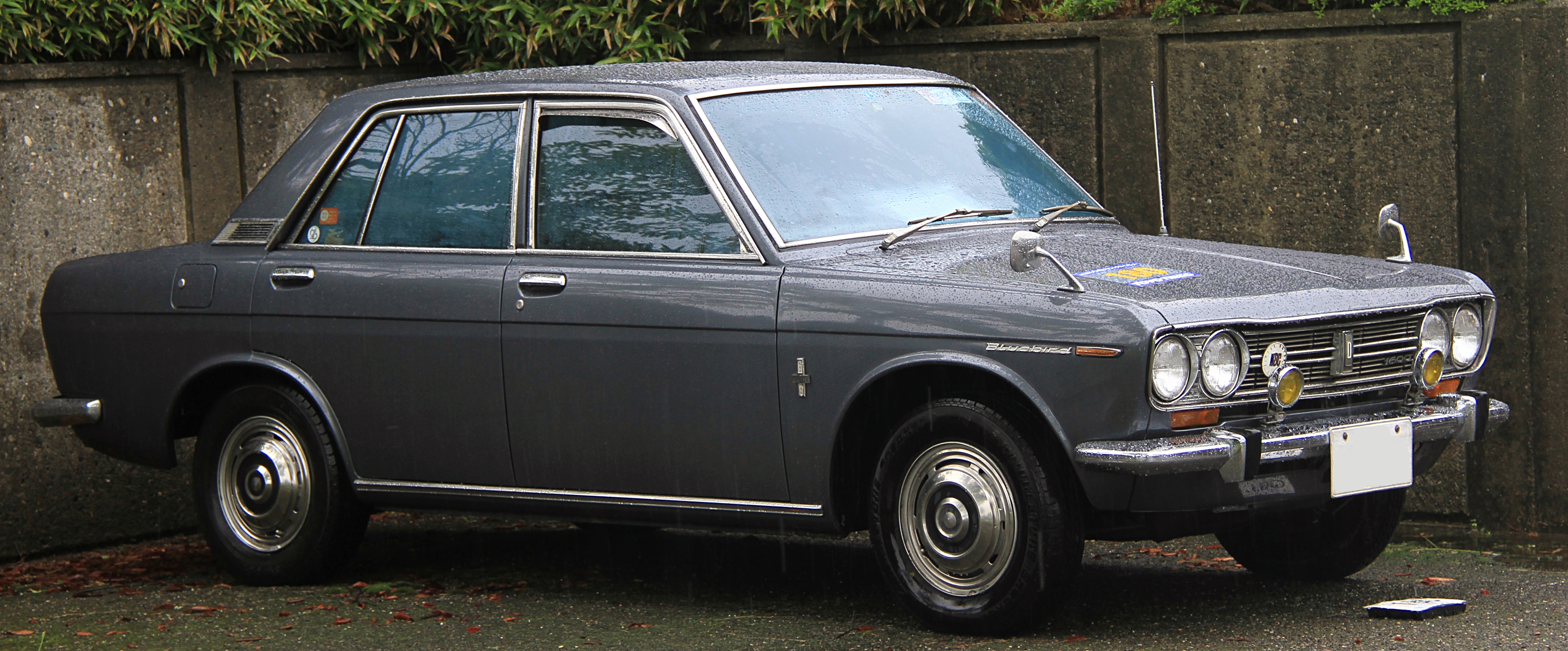

Overview
- Also called: Datsun 510; Datsun 1300/1400/1500/1600/1800; Tan Chong 510; Yue Loong YLN-706 (Taiwan)
- Production: August 1967–1973
- Assembly: Japan: Yokosuka, Kanagawa (Oppama plant); Australia: Clayton, Victoria (Nissan Australia); Mexico: Cuernavaca (CIVAC plant); New Zealand: Thames (CMI); Taiwan: Taipei County (Yulon)

Body and chassis
- Body style: 2/4-door sedan; 2-door coupé; 5-door station wagon
- Layout: FR layout

Dimensions
- Wheelbase: 2,420 mm (95.3 in)
- Length: 4,120 mm (162.2 in)
- Width: 1,560 mm (61.4 in)
- Height: 1,402 mm (55.2 in)

Launched in August 1967, it was one of the most comprehensive Bluebird ranges in terms of body styles: a two-door sedan, a four-door sedan, a five-door station wagon, and a two-door coupé (added in November 1968). The "510" still enjoys considerable fame in the U.S.

Like its predecessors, the 510 Bluebird line was imported into New Zealand, this time as a single 1.6-litre, four-speed manual Deluxe model, assembled from CKD kits by Campbell Industries (later Toyota New Zealand Thames assembly plant). Local content included glass, radiator, upholstery, carpet, paint, wiring and numerous other items. A few automatic and twin carburettor SSS versions were imported built-up from Japan, primarily for buyers who had access to funds overseas and could utilise the country's 'no remittance' new car purchase scheme to avoid lengthy waiting lists.

The trim designation "SS" was changed to "SSS" as General Motors was already using the term for performance branded Chevrolet products called the Super Sport starting in 1961.

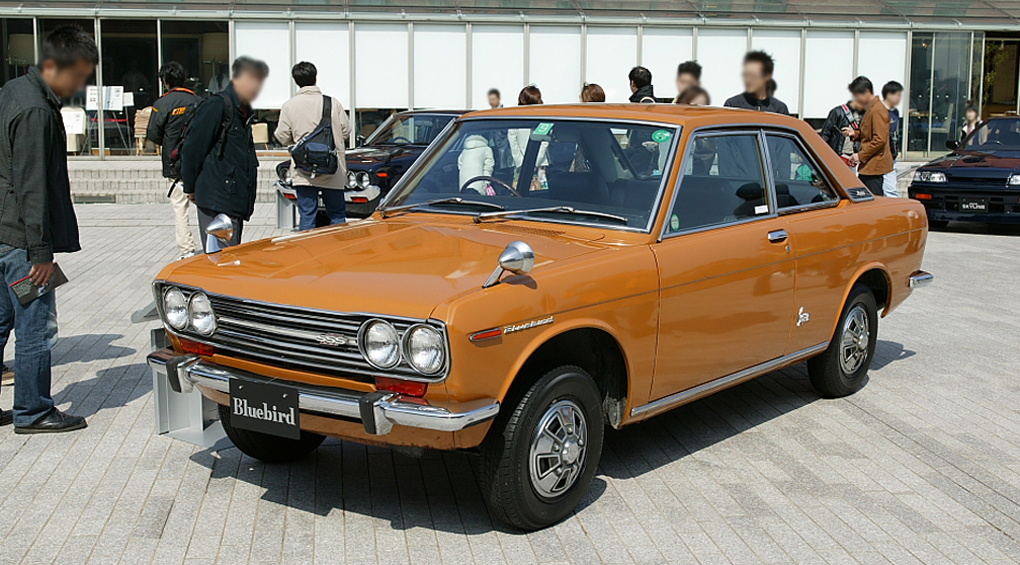
Datsun Bluebird "SSS" series 510 coupé

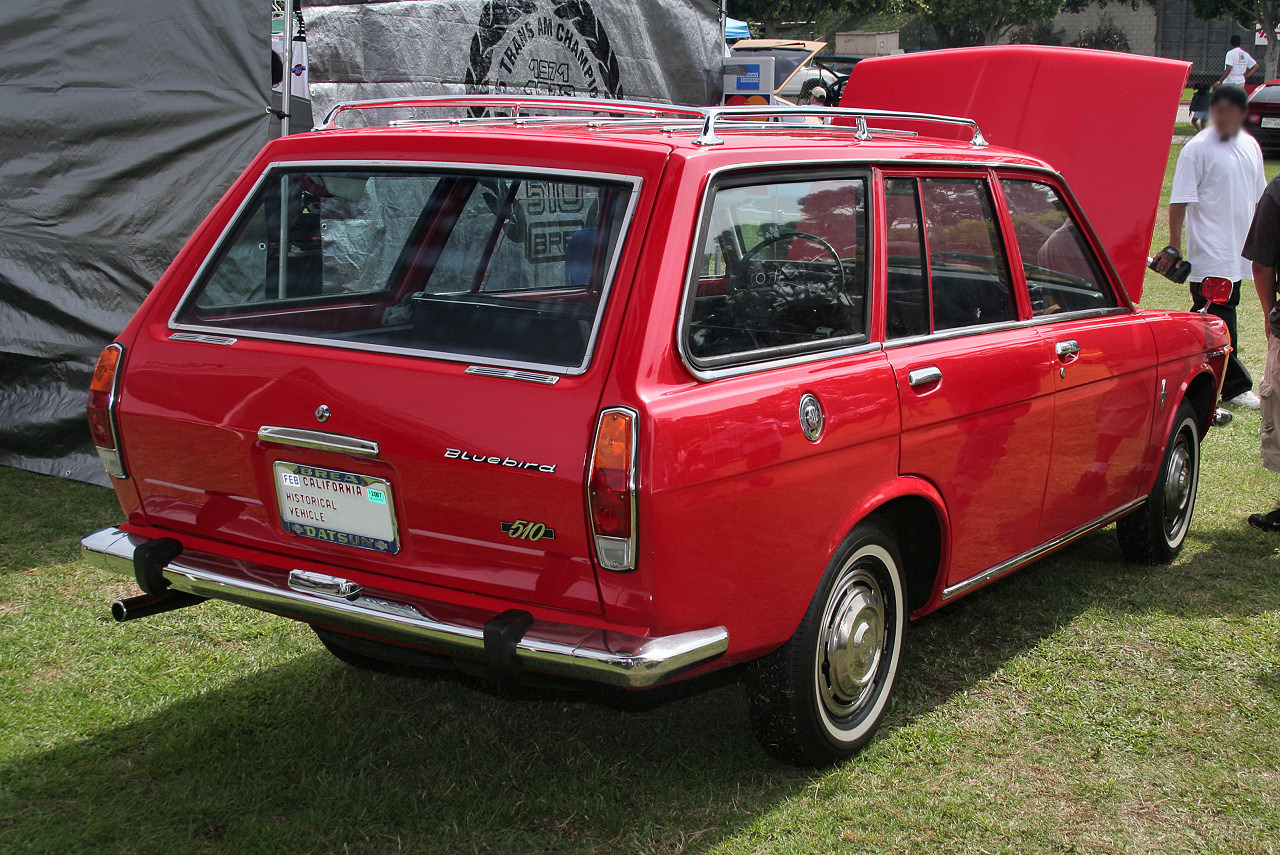
Datsun Bluebird 510 Wagon

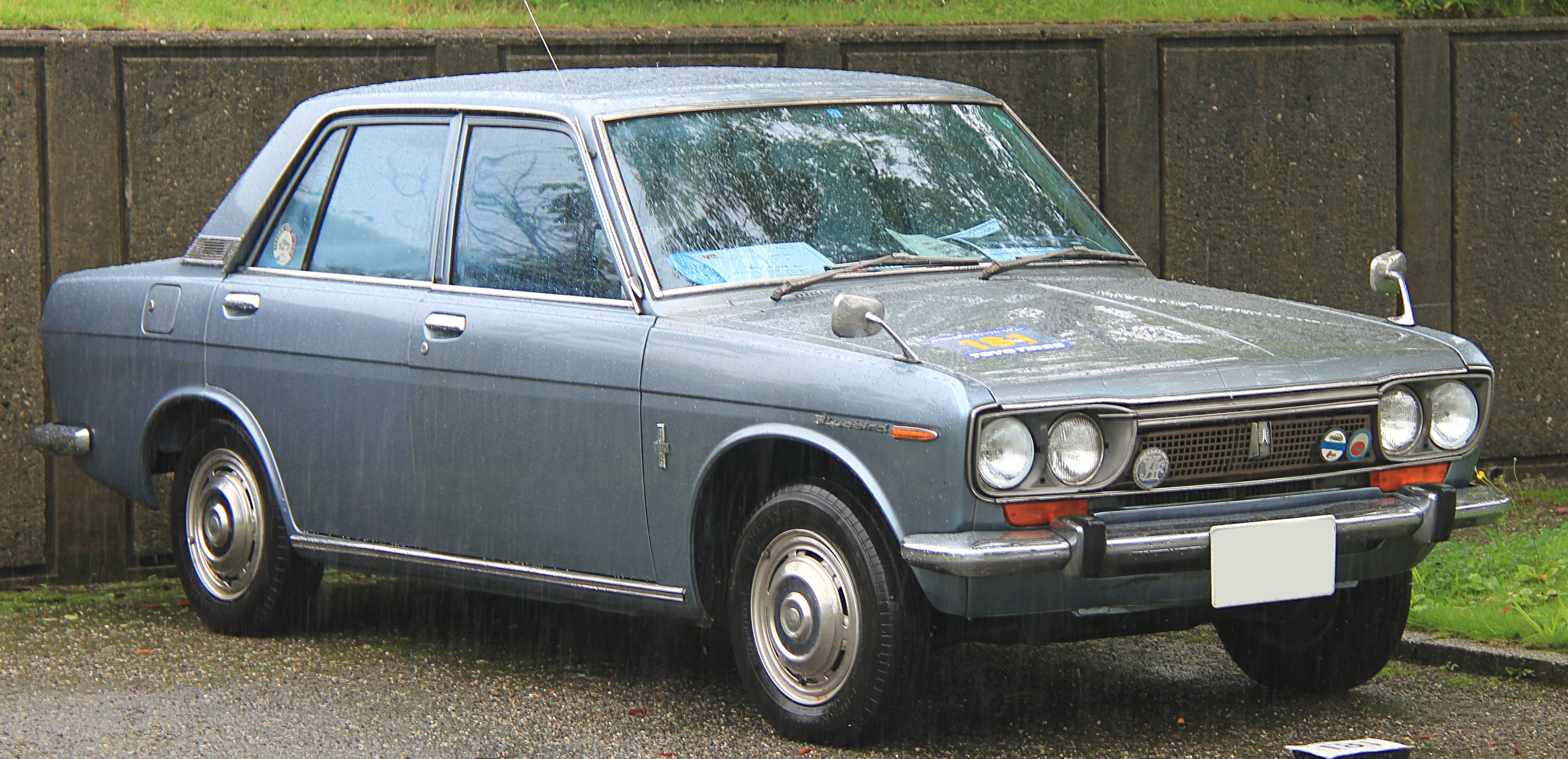
1972 Datsun Bluebird (facelift)

== 610 series ==
Datsun Bluebird 610
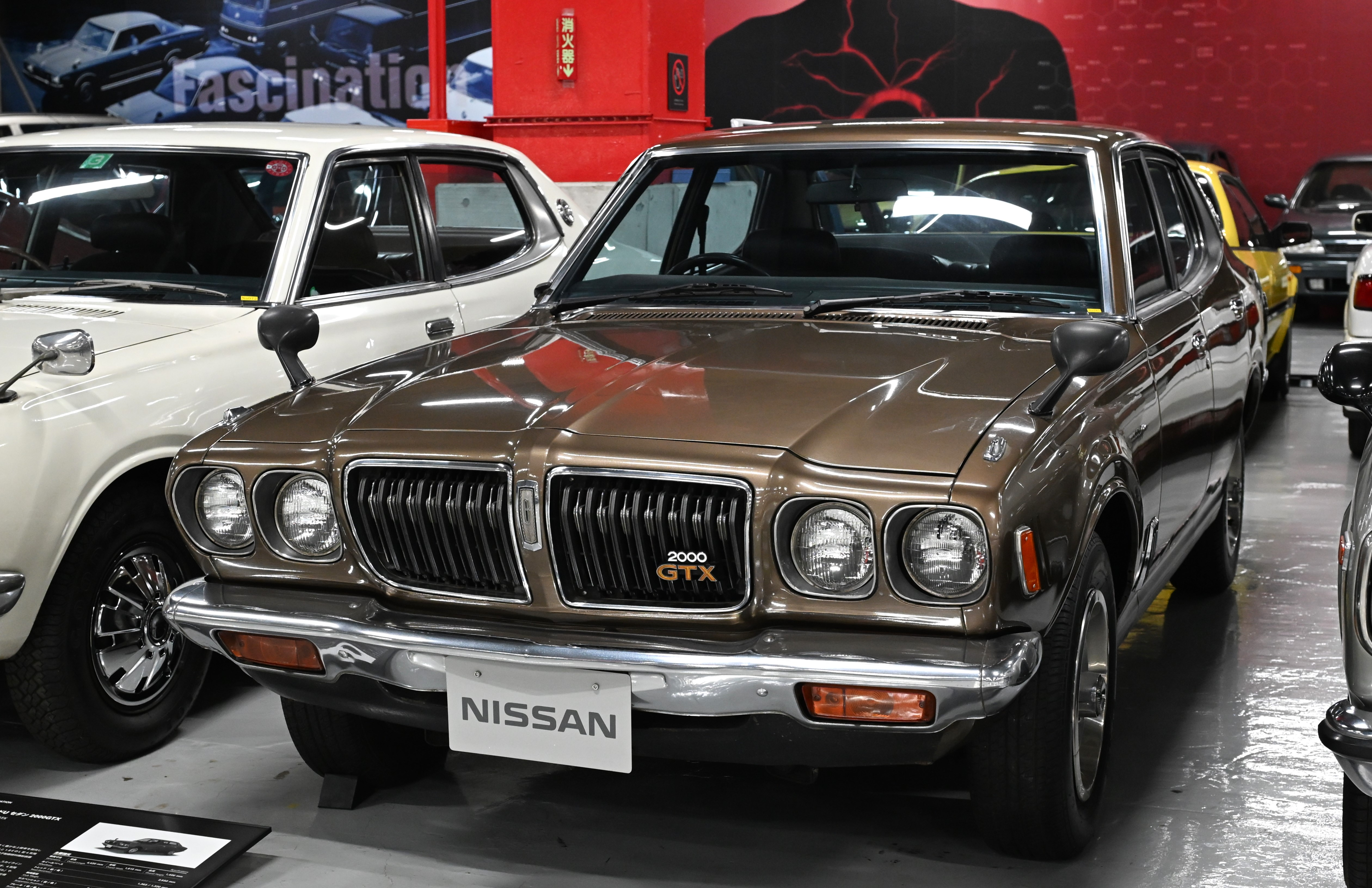
- Inline-six Datsun Bluebird 2000GTX sedan (G610)

Overview
- Also called: Datsun 160B/180B; Datsun 610
- Production: August 1971 – July 1976; October 1972 – October 1977 (Australia)
- Assembly: Japan: Yokosuka, Kanagawa (Oppama Plant); Australia: Clayton, Victoria (Nissan Australia); New Zealand: Thames (CMI); Porirua (Todd Motors)

Body and chassis
- Body style: 4-door sedan; 2-door coupé; 5-door station wagon
- Layout: FR layout
- Related: Datsun Truck 620

Powertrain
- Engine: 1595 cc L16 I4; 1770 cc L18 I4; 1952 cc L20B I4 (U.S.); 1998 cc L20/L20A I6 (G610)
- Transmission: 4-speed manual; 5-speed manual; 3-speed automatic

Dimensions
- Wheelbase: 2,500 mm (98.4 in); 2,650 mm (104.3 in) (G610)
- Length: 4,215 mm (165.9 in); 4,420 mm (174.0 in) (G610)
- Width: 1,600 mm (63.0 in)
- Height: 1,415 mm (55.7 in)
- Curb weight: 1,035 kg (2,282 lb)

The 610 series was launched in Japan in August 1971 and was badged as the Datsun Bluebird-U. The meaning behind the U suffix is "User Oriented", to signify the higher comfort levels than 510 predecessor could muster. A domestic advertising campaign used the catch-line "Bluebird U – Up You!", and was short-lived due to the innuendo. The 610 was one of the first Nissan products to adopt a popular styling appearance, called "coke bottle" which appeared internationally during the 1960s and 1970s, an appearance shared with the larger Nissan Cedric, as both vehicles were available at Japanese Nissan dealerships called Nissan Store. The SSS hardtop coupe was the first Nissan to adopt the new bodystyle, and subsequent Nissan products soon offered the appearance in both 2- and 4-door versions for several decades.

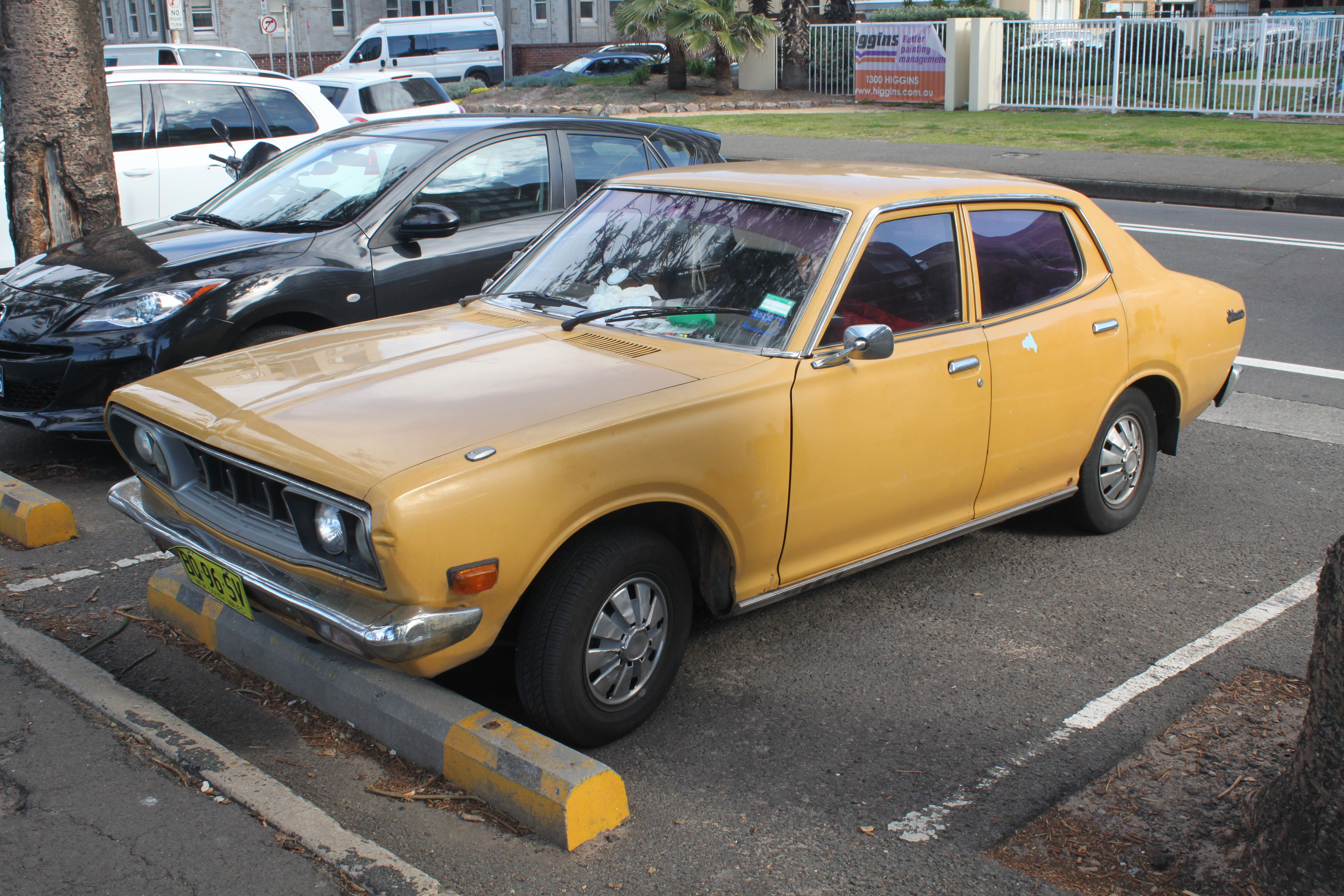
1972 Datsun 180B Deluxe sedan (Australia)

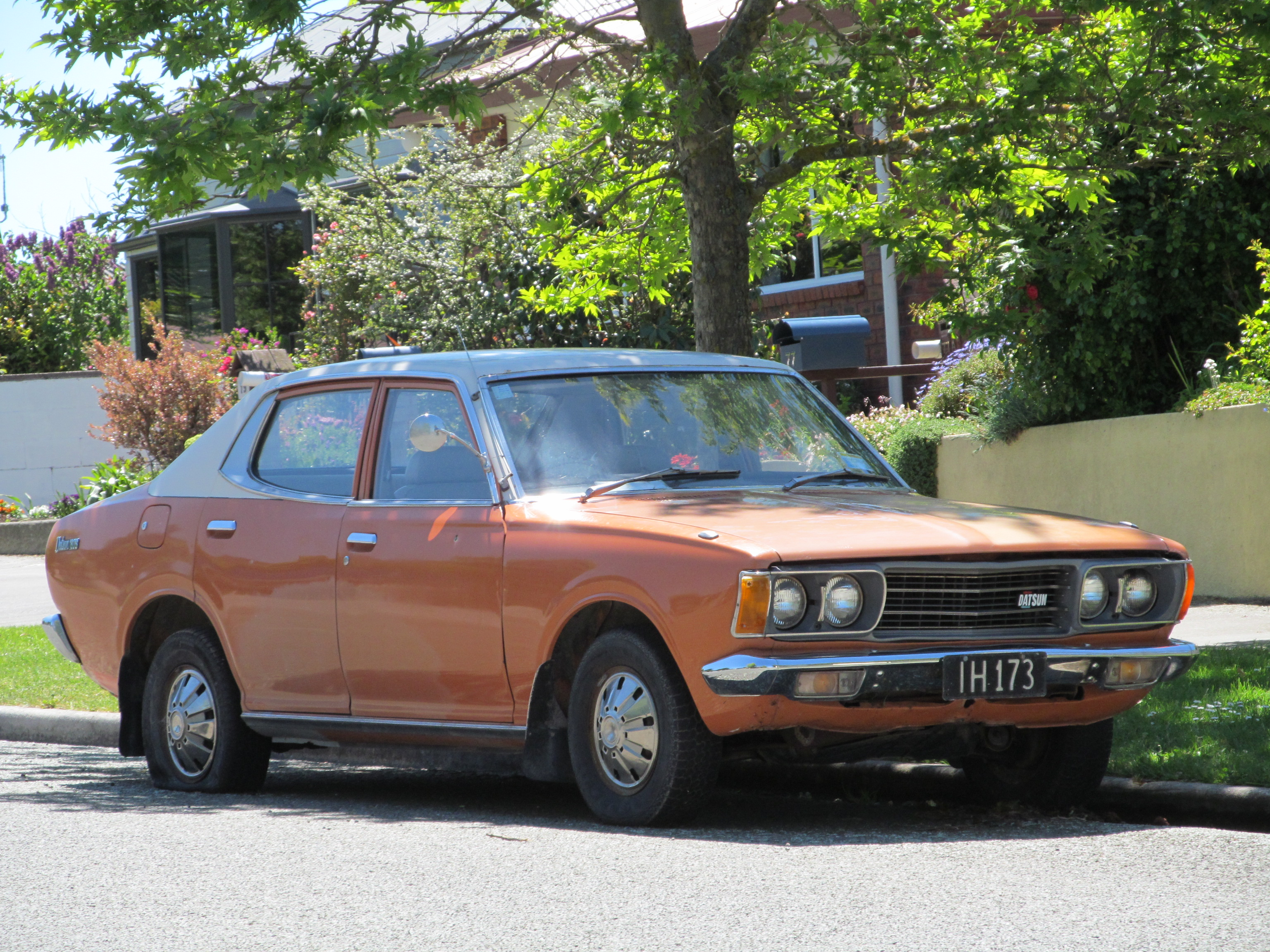
1977 Datsun 180B sedan (NZ)

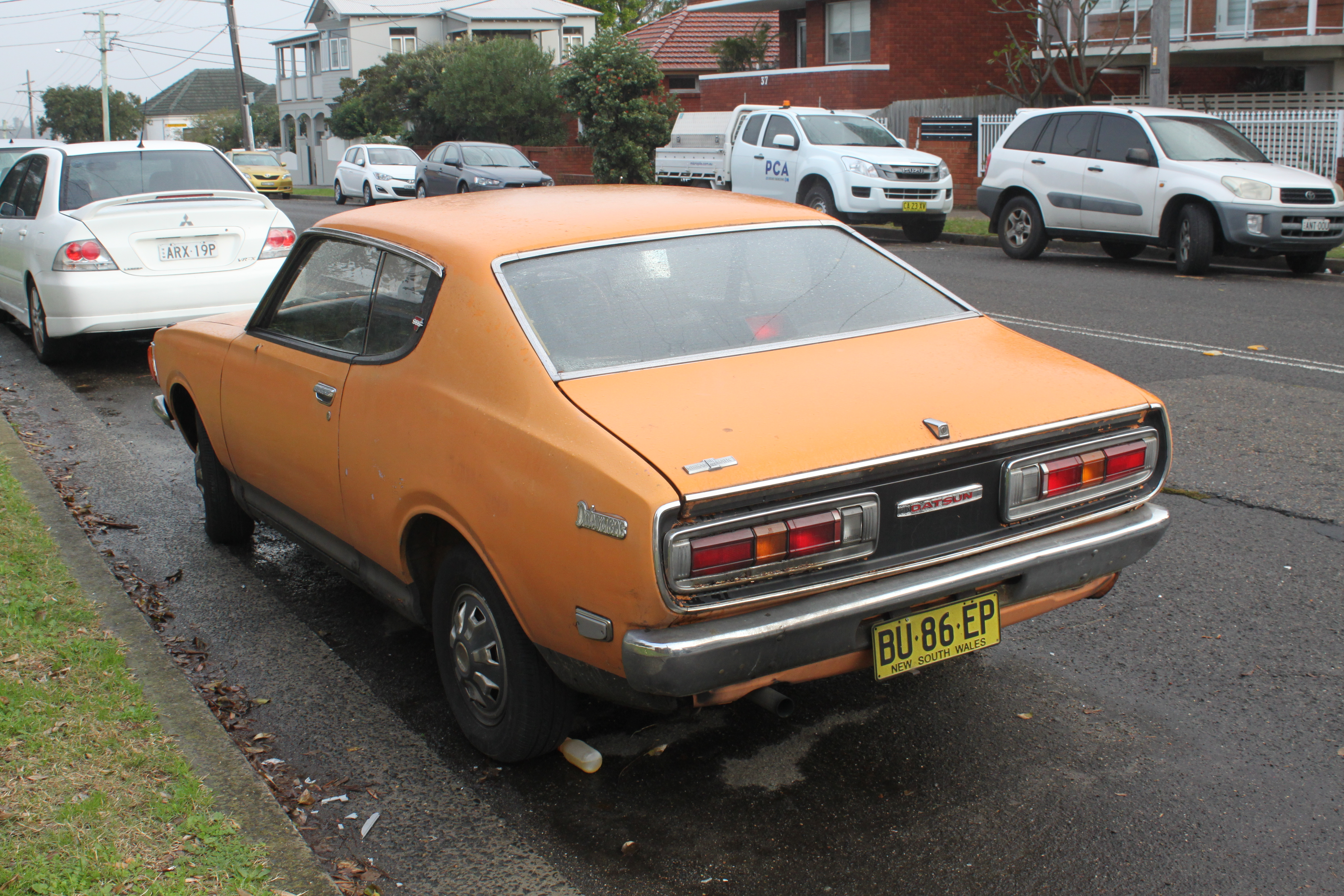
1974 Datsun 180B SSS hardtop (Australia)

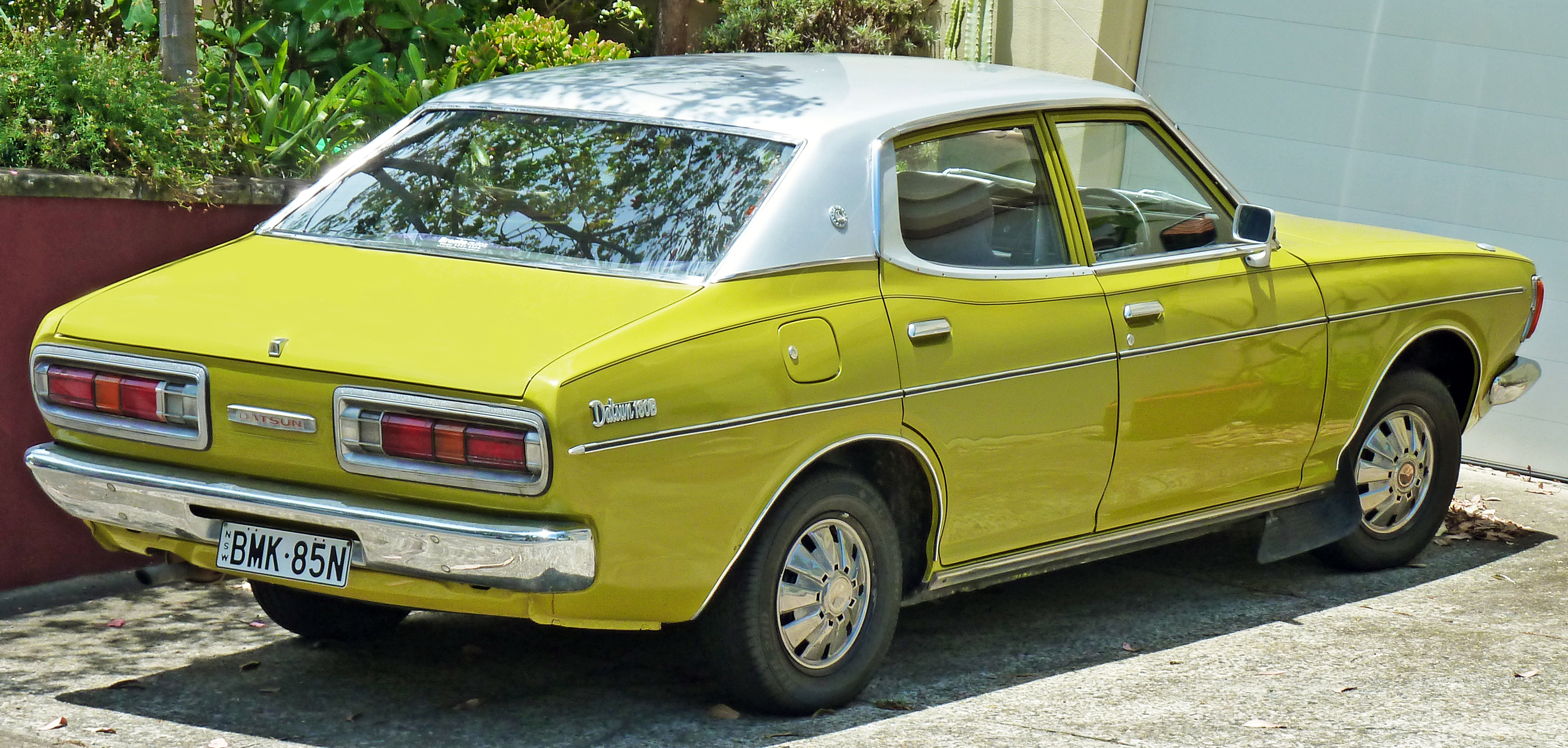
1977 Datsun 180B GL sedan (Australia)

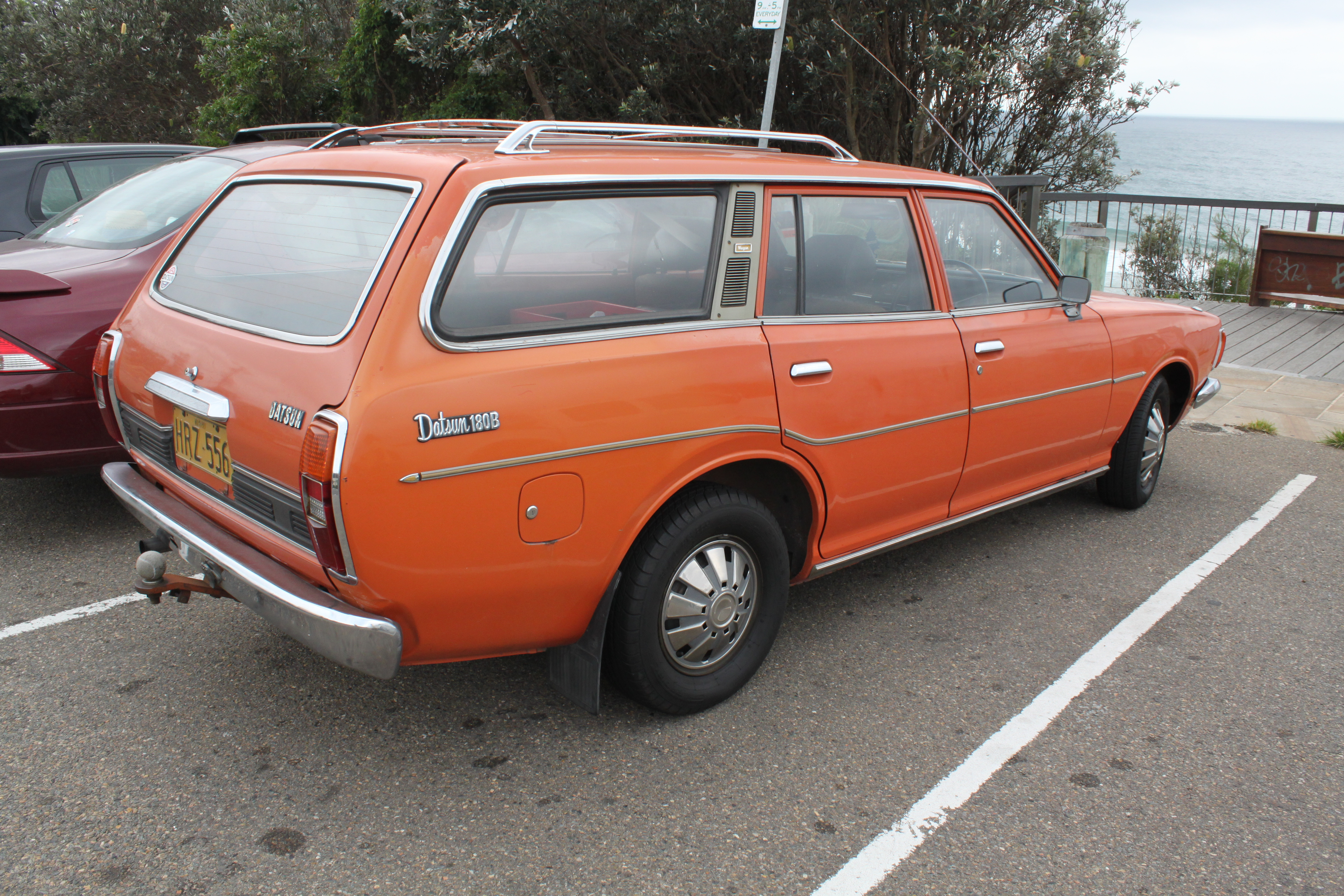
1975 Datsun 180B GX station wagon (Australia)

For the Japanese domestic market, the 610 was pitted against the second generation Toyota Mark II. Also in Japan, the 610 was initially sold alongside the 510 but eventually replaced the 510. 610s were available as a four-door, two-door hardtop, and a five-door wagon/light van. Trim levels in Japan were GL (Grand Luxe), SSS (Super Sports Sedan), DX (Deluxe) or STD (Standard). It borrowed its suspension and drive train from the outgoing 510, with some modifications. Likewise, the 610 four-door and two-door retained the class-leading, independent rear trailing arm design, while the wagon reused the rear live axle with leaf springs from the 510 wagon.

Whether four or six-cylinder models, all 610s were equipped with Nissan's L-series inline engines. In many export markets, including UK, Europe, and Australia, the 610 was badged as the 160B or 180B with respect to particular engine displacement. The Bluebird name also often appeared in advertising and in brochures. In the UK the popularity of the 160B/180B/180B SSS Coupe range further strengthened Datsun's position as the leading Japanese importer. As a result of Japanese Government passage of emission control regulations, Nissan introduced their emissions technology in 1975, using a badge that said "Nissan NAPS" (Nissan Anti Pollution System) on vehicles thus equipped. Most 610s worldwide came equipped with either a four-speed manual or a three-speed automatic transmission, but a five-speed manual transmission was available in the Japanese and Australian markets.

As with the 510, the SSS trim included miscellaneous sport options and a higher output engine with twin-Hitachi carburetors. A Japan-only SSS-E model was equipped with Bosch-licensed electronic fuel injection, and so was one of the first, mass-produced Nissan vehicles to be sold without a carburetor. Another 610 never exported was the inline-six U-2000 GT and U-2000 GTX (nicknamed "shark-nose" in Japanese), which shows some visual similarities to the Pontiac GTO and Oldsmobile Cutlass. Called the G610, it came with a stretched front end to accommodate the longer engine and featured a different grille and other aesthetic modifications. This model was not available as a wagon. The most powerful GTX-E received fuel injection and 130 PS (96 kW).

The 610 Bluebird received a facelift in 1974, with prominent turn signals mounted on the front corners and with a more squared off grille as well as new taillamps. The SSS models now had styled steel wheels without hubcaps. New equipment such as a remote trunk opener, interval wipers, a central handbrake (rather than the earlier "umbrella style" one), and new interior materials accompanied the external changes, while the engines were now capable of meeting the most recent emissions regulations, marketed as Nissan NAPS. This means that the 610 was available with three different front ends: original, facelift, and the "shark-nose" six-cylinder front. A minor upgrade to the front suspension (offset strut tops) for the 610 led to slightly improved handling before the introduction of the 810.

Australia

In Australia, Datsun released the locally produced 180B in October 1972 as a four-door sedan in Deluxe and GL trims, and a two-door SSS coupe. The engine fitted was the 1.8-litre L18 engine paired to a four-speed manual or three-speed automatic transmission; Datsun upgraded the SSS to a five-speed manual in 1975. Over the base Deluxe, GL models added: vinyl roof, radio with separate speaker, upgraded interior upholstery and trim, cut-pile interior carpeting, chrome exhaust extension, rear mounted GL badge, and whitewall tyres. In early 1974, wrap-around front indicators, new tail-lights and cabin trim changes heralded a range-wide facelift, while a fully imported (not locally manufactured) luxury GX sedan arrived in November 1974.

The GX model could only be differentiated on the exterior by its grille, wipers and badges, although the interior gained luxuries such as cloth inserts for the vinyl upholstery and a three-way adjustable driving seat (fore/aft, recline, thigh support). A GX wagon followed in June 1975, followed by a minor trim and grille facelift in 1976. The 180B proved popular right to its discontinuation in October 1977, when the P810 200B range arrived in Australia.

North America

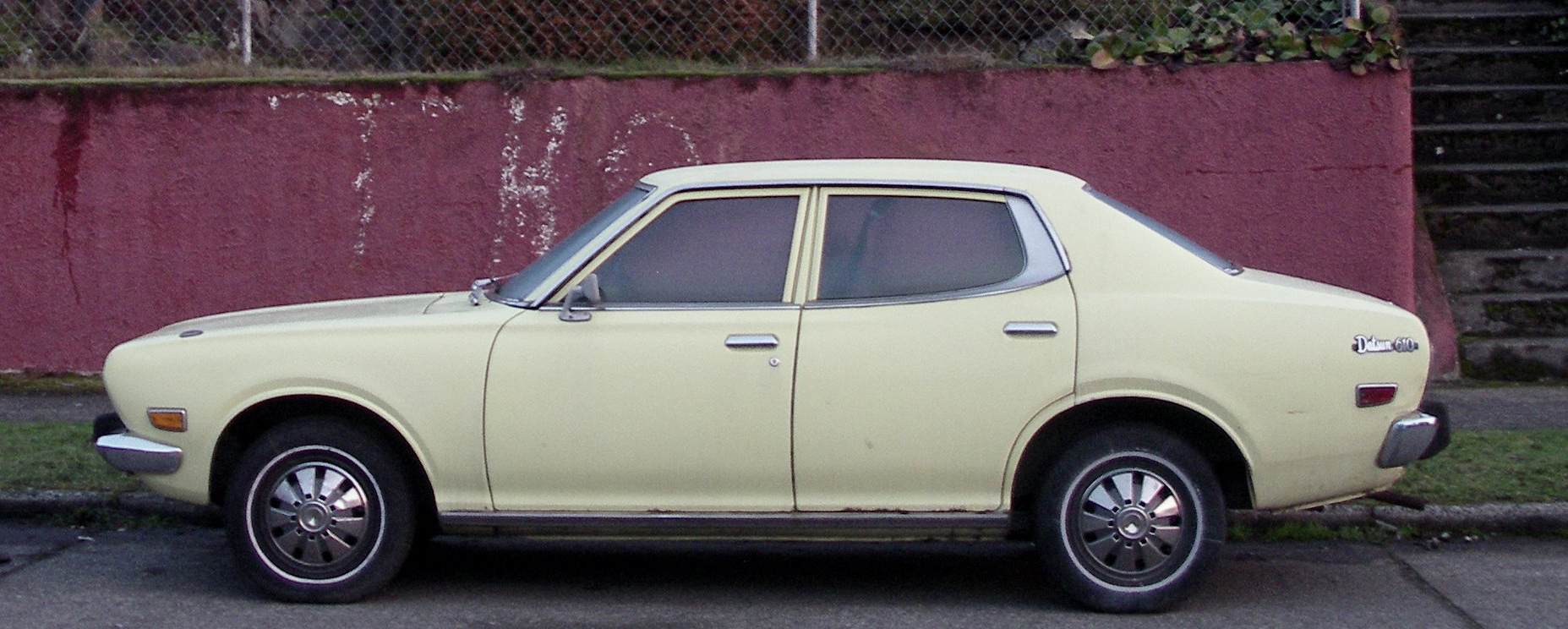
1973 Datsun 610 sedan (US; later model years have considerably larger bumpers)

In the United States and Canada, the car was sold simply as the "Datsun 610". The four-door sedans, a two-door hardtop coupé, and a five-door station wagon were available, and were marketed as a more luxurious and larger product than the 510. For 1973 and 1974, North American 610 HT models were equipped with the six-bulb tail lights that covered the entire rear panel, requiring the license plate to be mounted below the rear bumper. The car originally received criticisms for elevated noise levels and engine drivability problems; Nissan responded with engine improvements during 1973 and a new engine for 1974, mounted on new engine mounts to lower noise and vibration. The window seals were also modified, to lower wind noise.

While the original Datsun 610 had a 94 hp (70 kW) 1770 cc L18 engine, 1974–1976 610s received the larger 2.0-litre L20B engine (as did the Datsun 710 from 1975), with slightly more power at 97 hp (72 kW) (SAE Net). The federalized 2.0 thus produced less than what was claimed for a Japanese market 1.6. California-spec cars were less powerful yet, with 94 hp (70 kW). The federal/Canadian version took leaded fuel and depended on an EGR system for pollution control, while the California cars have a catalytic converter and require unleaded petrol, using technology labeled in Japan as Nissan NAPS. Gross horsepower ratings are 110 and 107 respectively. The 1974s also received larger bumpers mounted on hydraulic cylinders to meet new safety standards, increasing weight by about 215 lb (98 kg) and making the car 2.2 in (56 mm) longer. The additional weight meant performance still suffered moderately (while fuel consumption dropped by about ten percent) from the higher weight and additional emissions equipment.

Until the 1977 introduction of the six-cylinder 810, the 610 was Datsun's largest car sold in North America.

New Zealand

New Zealand market cars initially were a single 1.8-litre 180B sedan, again with four-speed manual transmission and assembled from CKD kits under contract by Campbell's. A three-speed automatic – using a transmission made by Nissan Japan subsidiary JATCO – was later added as a factory option. Relaxed restrictions on car assembly kit imports and increasing affluence in NZ meant Campbell's, which also assembled Toyota, Renault, Rambler, Hino, Isuzu and Peugeot models over the years, could not meet demand so Nissan-Datsun (NZ) contracted Chrysler/Mitsubishi importer Todd Motors to assemble additional manual 180Bs at its Porirua factory alongside the Chrysler Valiant, Hunter, Avenger and Alpine model ranges and Mitsubishi Lancer sedan and Colt Galant coupe. The Todd-built cars gave Datsun dealers a new range of paint colours all different from those Campbell's offered.

=== Racing history ===
610 Bluebird four-doors participated in the 1972 and 1973 East African Safari Rallies as the "Datsun 1800 SSS". In 1973, 610s placed second and fourth overall, behind the overall winning Datsun 240Z. Bob Sharp drove his 610 HT race car to second place overall in the American SCCA B Sedan Championship for 1973 and 1974. The same car achieved a first place for the 1976 SCCA B-Sedan Championship but with Elliot Forbes-Robinson driving.

=== 710 series ===
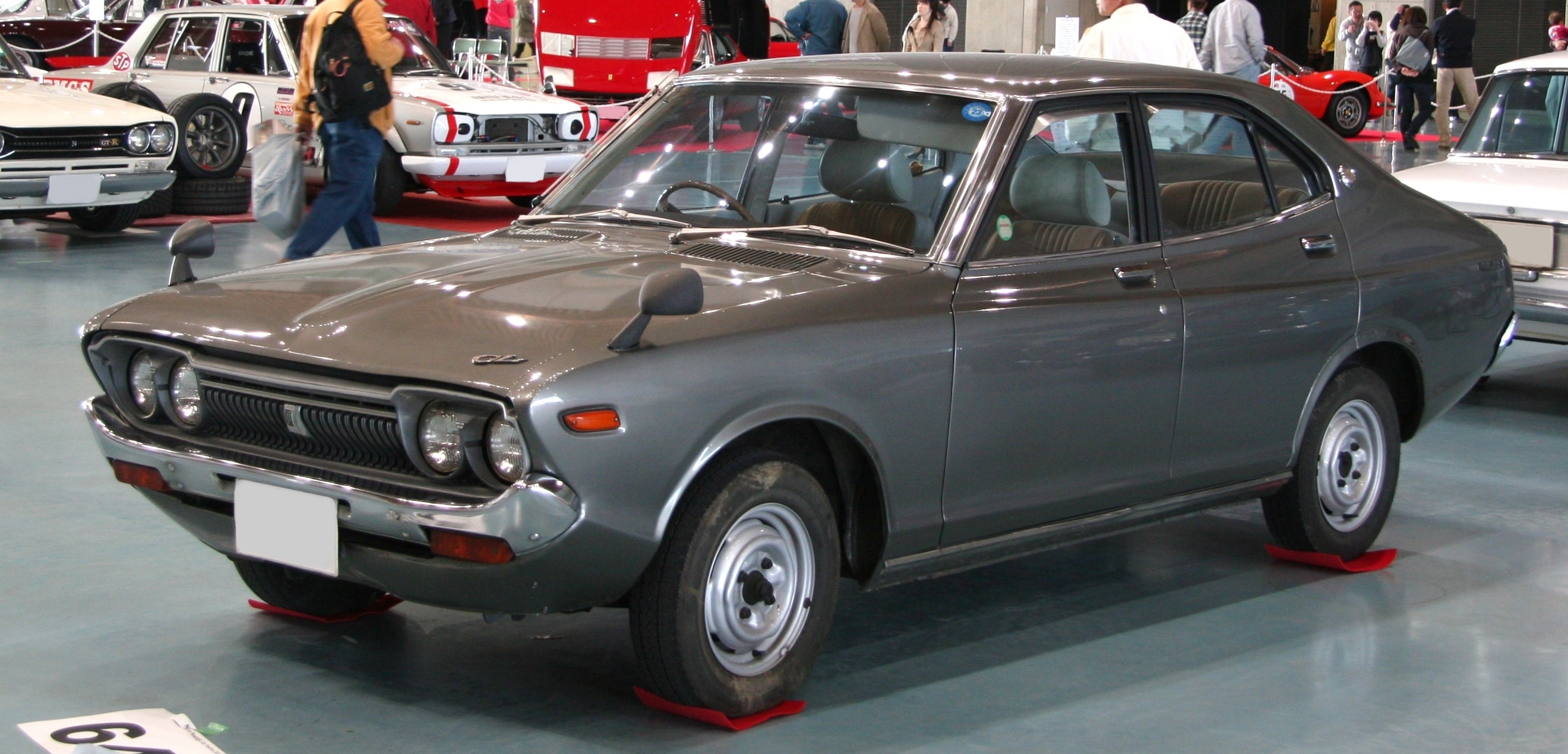
Datsun Violet 710 series sedan

Shortly after the introduction of the 610, Nissan launched a new line of slightly smaller cars January 1973 utilizing parts and styling cues from the 610. This new line of cars was sold in various markets as the Datsun 140J/160J, Datsun Violet, or Datsun 710. In Japan, it was exclusive to Nissan Cherry Store Japanese dealerships as a larger companion to the smaller Nissan Cherry, thereby giving Nissan the opportunity to sell a Bluebird-sized vehicle at a different sales channel. The use of the 710 name was a source of confusion because it implied that the model was either a larger, upscale version of the 610 (it was the opposite) or a newer model in the Bluebird line. This car was built at various international plants and was marketed under different names as local conditions required. As the Bluebirds traditional cross-town rival, the Toyota Corona split into a new model called the Toyota Carina, the Violet appeared just under three years after the Carina did.

== 810 series ==
Datsun Bluebird 810
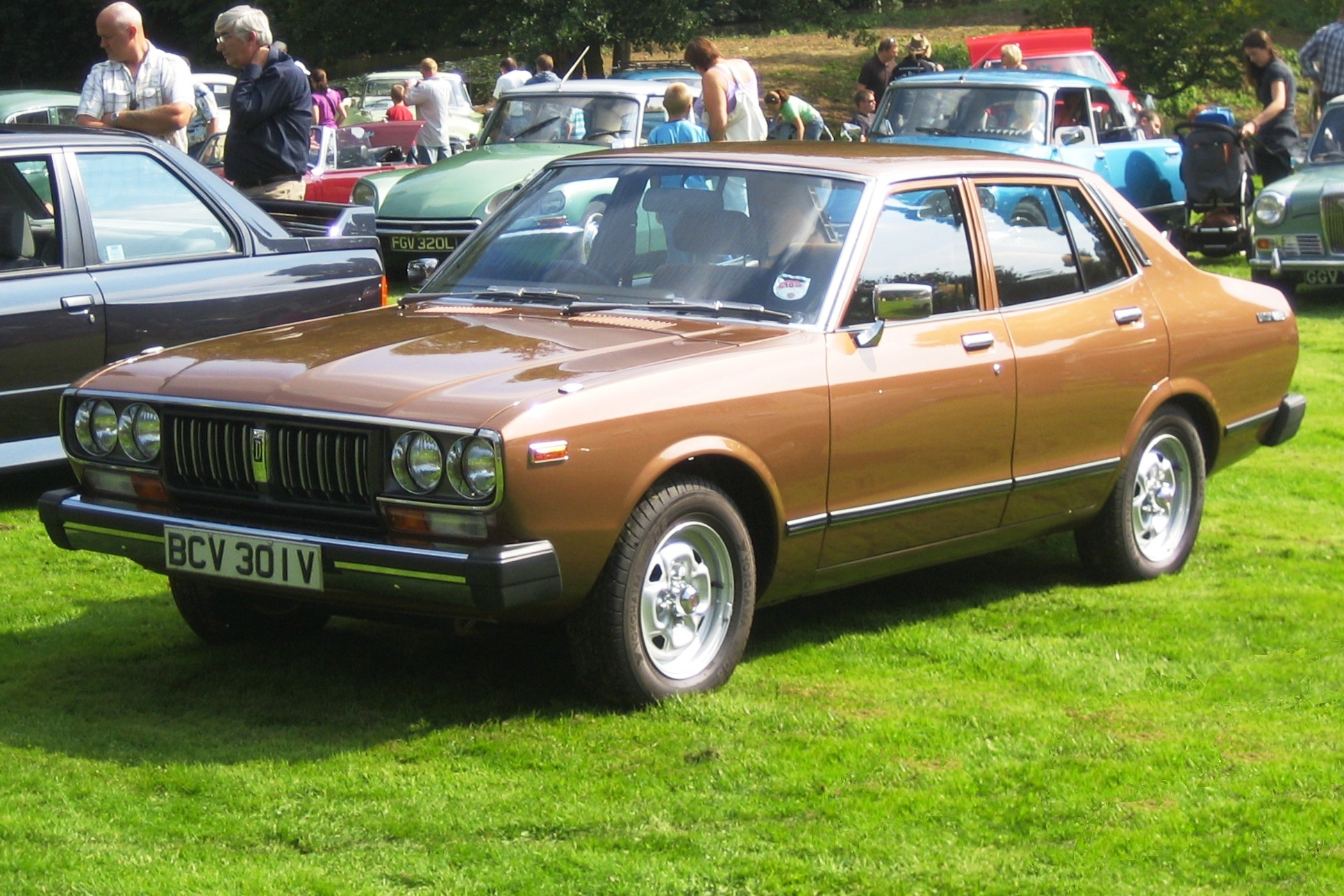
- 1979 Datsun Bluebird 1.8 GL Sedan (810 series)

Overview
- Also called: Datsun 160B; Datsun 180B; Datsun 200B; Datsun 810
- Production: July 1976 – November 1979; 1977–1980 (New Zealand)
- Assembly: Japan: Oppama Plant, Yokosuka, Kanagawa; Australia: Clayton, Victoria (Nissan Australia); New Zealand: Wiri (Nissan New Zealand)

Body and chassis
- Body style: 4-door saloon/sedan; 2-door coupé; 5-door wagon/van
- Layout: FR layout

Powertrain
- Engine: 1595 cc L16 I4; 1595 cc Z16 I4; 1770 cc L18/L18E I4; 1770 cc Z18/Z18E I4; 1952 cc L20B I4; 1998 cc L20/L20E I6; 2393 cc L24/L24E I6
- Transmission: 4/5-speed manual; 3-speed automatic

Dimensions
- Wheelbase: 2,500 mm (98.4 in); 2,650 mm (104.3 in) (G4/G6)
- Length: 4,260 mm (167.7 in)
- Width: 1,631 mm (64.2 in)
- Height: 1,389 mm (54.7 in)
- Curb weight: 1,084 kg (2,390 lb)

The 810 was introduced in July 1976. Engine options were largely carried over, with all petrol engines offered in Japan meeting the 1976 emissions requirements thanks to Nissan's NAPS system. Styling was an evolution of the 610s, with slightly squared off features but retaining a slight "coke bottle" shape. No two-door sedan was available, but the four-door sedan, two-door hardtop coupé (SSS Coupé) and five-door station wagon were offered. As usual, the wagon was mainly sold as a "light van" in Japan, meaning that it was engineered with cargo in mind and had a live, leaf-sprung rear axle rather than the independent rear suspension of the saloons and coupés.

The Bluebird 810 was sold in export markets as the Datsun 160B/180B/200B and as the Datsun 810. Australian magazine Wheels called the 200B 'a 180B with 20 more mistakes.' The heavy-looking and rather outdated 810 did not sell very well and Nissan responded by accelerating work on the next generation Bluebird (910), leaving the 810 in production for only three years and four months.

In Japan the range gradually received upgraded motors which could pass the 1978 emissions standards; these models carry 811 series chassis numbers. Japanese market 811-series vehicles replaced the Bluebird badge on the rear decklid with a NAPS badge, identifying emission control technology as having been installed. The process of meeting the 1978 standards began in October 1977 and continued until August 1978 and meant replacing the earlier L-series engines with the new crossflow Z engines, based on the L. From March 1979 until the end of production in November that year, the NAPS badge was once again removed from passenger cars (although taxis featured a "NAPS-Z" badge as they were now equipped with the new Z engine).

In Japan there continued to be a six-cylinder version of the Bluebird available. As before, this received a longer wheelbase and nose, while retaining the rear end of the regular Bluebird range. The Bluebird G6 used a carburetor for the base model and fuel injection for the sporty version. The 2.0 L engine was good for 115 or 130 PS (85 or 96 kW) JIS depending on fuel feed. In August 1978 the Bluebird G4 was introduced (PD811), a 1.8-litre four-cylinder model fitted with the long-nose bodywork.

=== Europe (160B/180B) ===
At this time, with several UK auto-producers such as British Leyland losing market share, Datsun had grabbed the headlines as the UK's leading car importer. The magazine Autocar road tested a 180B Bluebird and recorded a top speed of 101 mph (163 km/h) along with a 0–60 mph (0 – 97 km/h) time of 13.6 seconds. The Datsun's overall fuel consumption for the test was 27.7 mpg (10.2 L/100 km). For all three of these performance measurements, it was marginally better than the Ford Cortina 1600 GL which continued to dominate this sector in the UK, but both cars were beaten for speed and acceleration (though not for fuel economy) by the relatively crude Morris Marina 1.8HL. It was probably more significant that the Bluebird had a manufacturer's recommended retail price, including sales taxes, of £2950 as against £3263 for the Ford and £3315 for the Morris. The testers found the car matched the competition in most respects, though the brakes were criticised for being "not up to current standards".

In Europe, the 160B claimed 81 PS (60 kW), while the larger-engined 180B had 88 PS (65 kW) to offer. The sporting SSS model had to make do with a very modest power increase; two more horsepower for 90 PS (66 kW).

=== Australia (200B) ===
Introduced in October 1977 in Australia, the first 200Bs were all fully imported in sedan, station wagon and coupe forms, the latter retaining the SSS badge. In January 1978 local assembly began for the sedan, followed shortly by the wagon. The sedan trim levels were GL and GX. While the coupe remained a hardtop, Datsun added an opera window in the rear pillar. The coupe was discontinued in Australia in 1979. The engine used is a larger version of the L series engine from the preceding 180B. Dubbed the L20B its capacity was increased to 1952 cc, making it good for 72 kW (97 hp).

Almost immediately the 200B became Australia's top selling four-cylinder car, a position it held until it was displaced by the Mitsubishi Sigma. Its popularity however remained strong right through the production run, family buyers appreciative of the plentiful interior room and standard features. It may have been somewhat conservatively styled, but the effort Nissan had put into the engineering of the car made it reliable and tough, qualities most Australians rated higher than a more advanced design.

Only the early fully imported 200B sedans and coupés retained the independent rear suspension from the 180B, locally assembled 200B sedans instead switched to coil springs with a live axle, while the wagon (imported from Japan) had a live axle in the rear with leaf springs. Seen as a giant step backwards, the reason for the change was certainly not a cost-cutting measure, but simply the need for Nissan to reach an 85% local content quota that the then Federal Government demanded of Australian car manufacturers. However, in practice the live rear axle, being an Australian development, proved to actually benefit the car's overall handling dynamics. The 2-litre overhead cam engine could be loud at high revs, and there were drive line vibration issues. A correction programme was instituted by the parent company in Japan.

A sportier version of the 200B sedan was released in June 1978. The new SX featured a revised grille, front spoiler, alloy wheels, revised door and seat trim (striped seat inserts) and tachometer, while the suspension was altered to improve handling. The colours available for this model were simply blue, white or red, and the only transmission available was a 4-speed floor shift. Significantly the SX was a unique model to Australia, the added input from Nissan's Australian design engineers signified a step away from just assembling cars. This in turn led to the locally built Datsuns, and later Nissans, being re-engineered to better suit Australian conditions, with many components being sourced locally – a tradition that would continue right up until 1992, when Nissan ceased local manufacture.

In October 1979, the 200B was revised with a new grille, bumpers, seats, trim, and dashboard. The seats were a unique Australian design for the locally built cars. This facelift was penned by Paul Beranger, a former Holden designer – years later he would style the 2006 Toyota Aurion.

In 1980, a limited edition 200B Aspen GL sedan was released featuring distinctive shadow tone paint available in green, blue, or grey. The 200B was discontinued in May 1981, replaced by the Datsun Bluebird. Australian comedy band, Tripod, have written a song about the 200B, called "200B."

=== New Zealand (160B/180B/200B) ===
This model was also released to New Zealand in 1977, assembled CKD in 4-door sedan and 5-door wagon forms. A coupe model was also released, imported built-up from Japan. Unlike the Australian models the sedans used the independent rear suspension system of the Japanese specification models. This Bluebird was the first to be assembled in Nissan New Zealand's own brand-new assembly plant at Wiri, South Auckland. For the first two years of assembly the cars were fitted with a 1.8-litre unit, hence they used the 180B nameplate. Automatic transmission was optional for both. Nissan also added its first luxury ZX version with this generation – features included velour upholstery, 'luxury' cut-pile carpet sourced locally and tinted glass. There was also, for the first time in Kiwi assembly, a wagon variant with mid-range trim and equipment.

During 1979 a number of changes were made on the car, namely an engine enlargement to 2.0 (leading to a renaming of the car to 200B), and a mild facelift, using new dual rectangular headlights and a new grille. Due to New Zealand's favour for smaller-engined models, a 1.6-litre 160B variant was also introduced.

Production of the New Zealand 160/200B continued until late 1980, when it was replaced by the Datsun Bluebird (910).

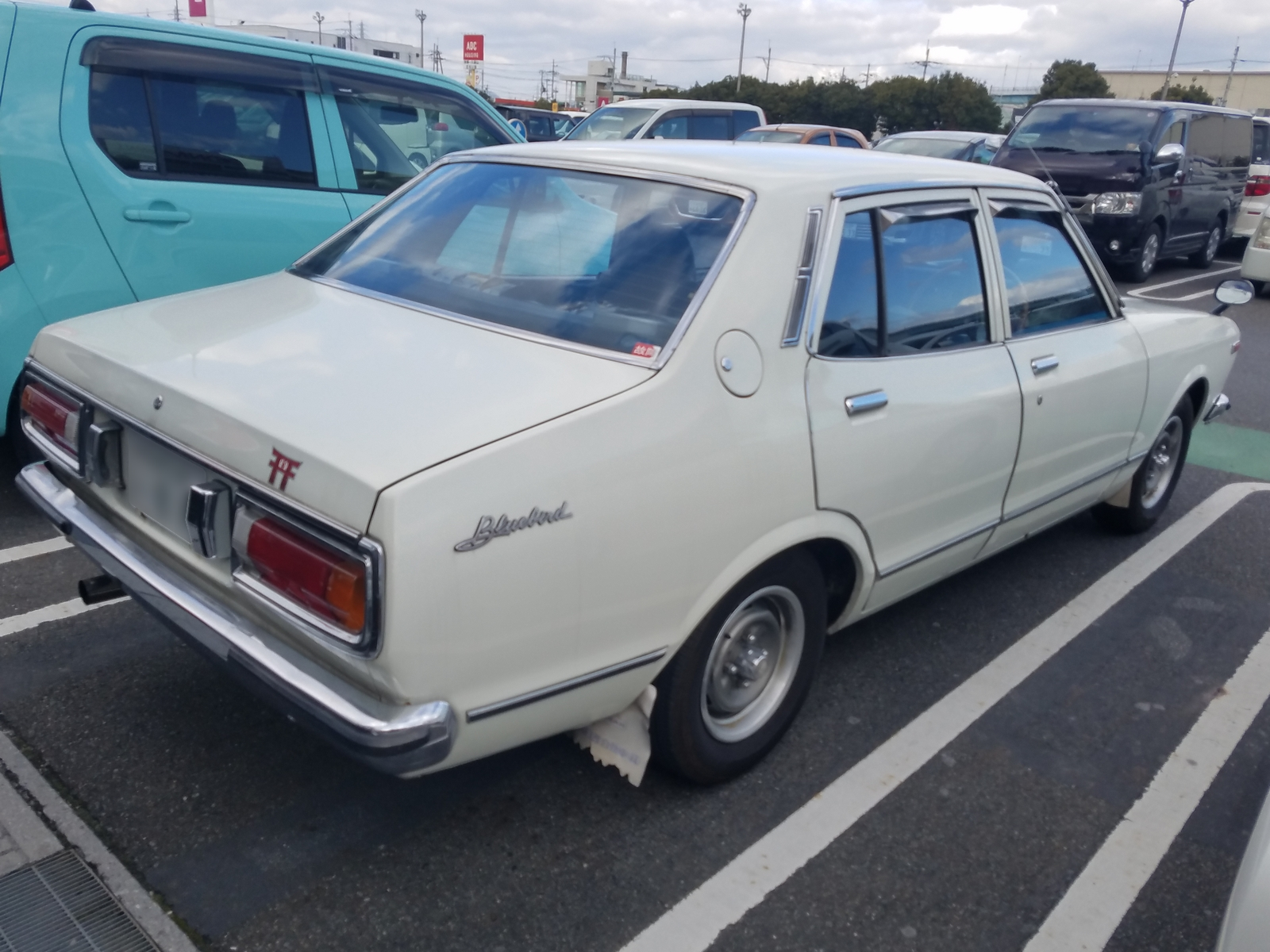
Nissan Bluebird 1.8 GL (JDM; rear view)

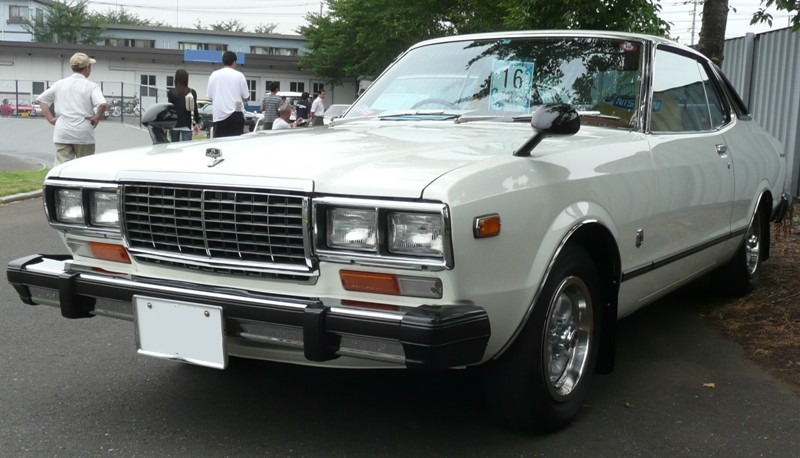
Bluebird 2000 G6 Hardtop (JDM)

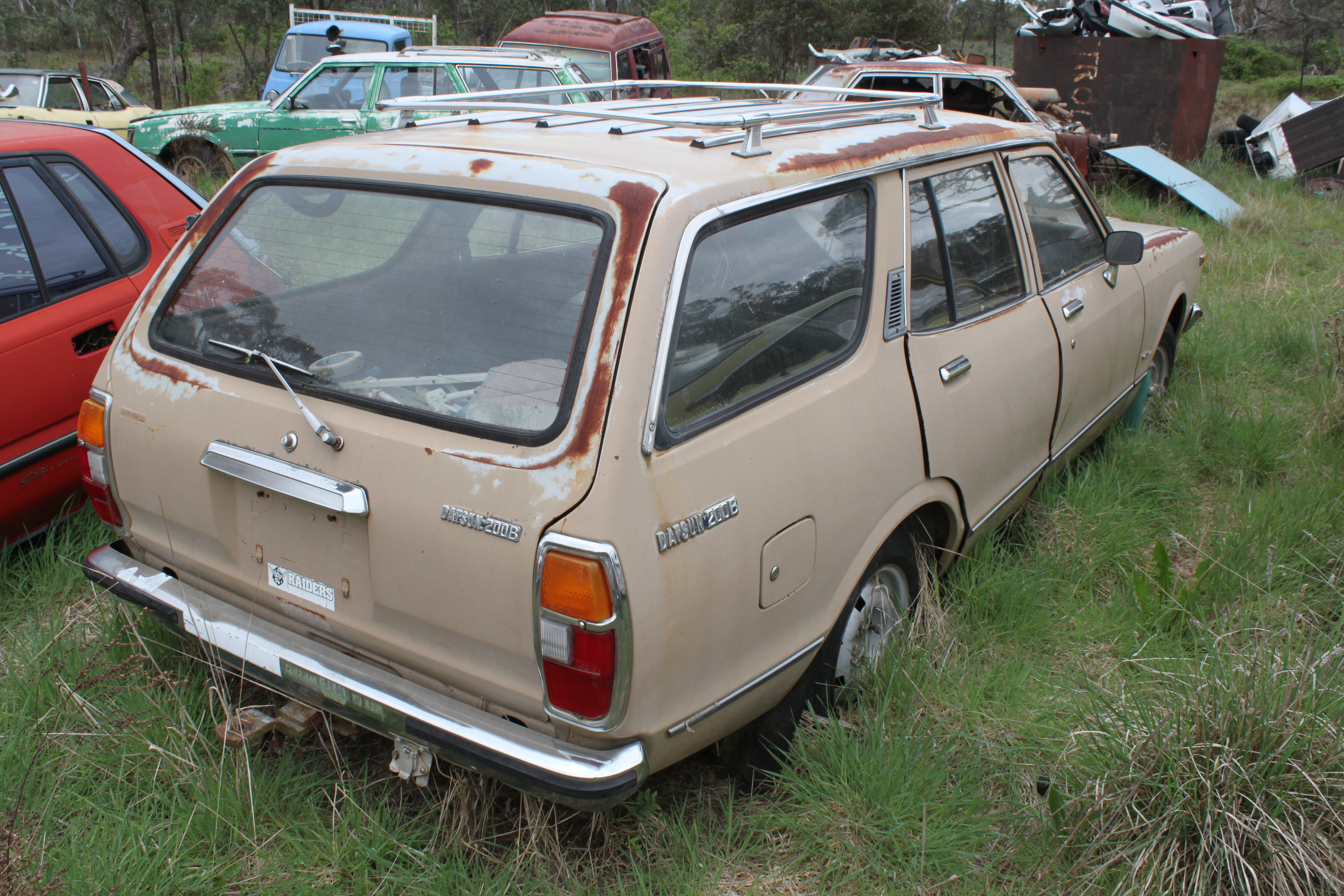
Datsun 200B GL station wagon (Australia; rear view)

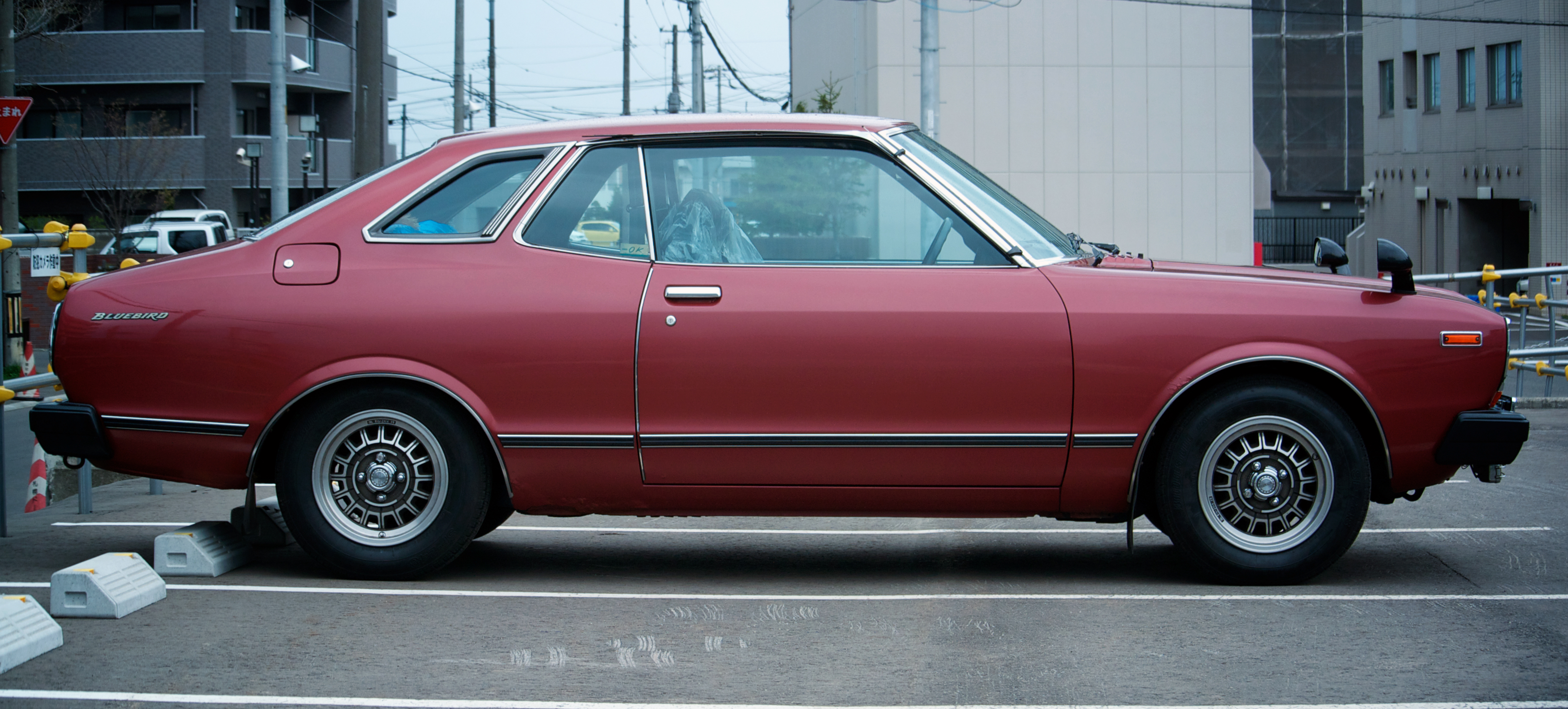
Nissan Bluebird Hardtop (JDM)

=== North America (810) ===
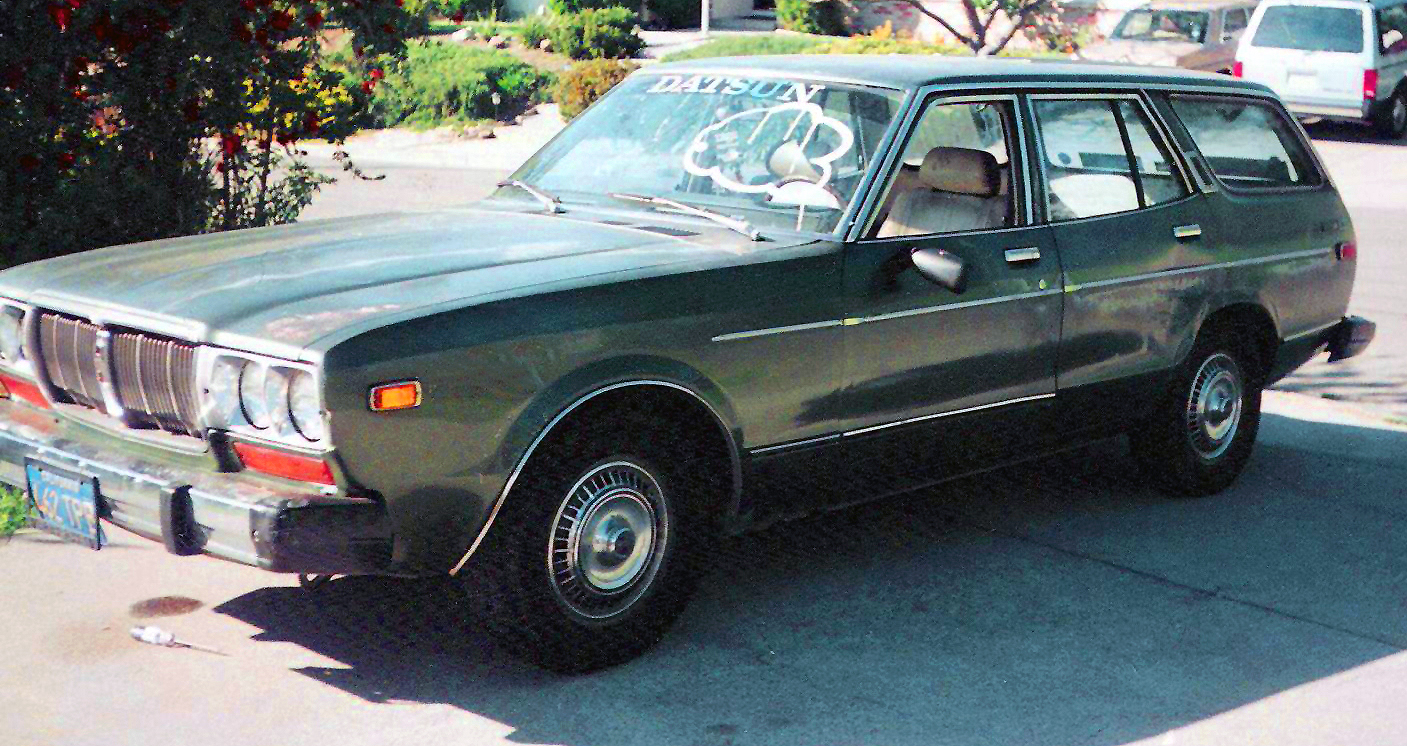
1977 Datsun 810 wagon

In North America, Datsun marketed the 810 series Bluebird sold as the Datsun 810 from February 1977 to 1980—the direct ancestor of the long running Datsun/Nissan Maxima range. The Datsun 810 model line began with the six-cylinder Nissan Bluebird 2000G6 sold in Japan. With a longer nose than the regular Bluebird, to accommodate a longer inline-six engine, it was powered by two versions of the SOHC L-series I6 engine: a 2.0 L displacement for the Japanese market and the 2.4-litre L24E unit for the US market. The bigger American engine could reach 125 hp (93 kW) SAE. The Sport version channeled power through a four-speed manual transmission for the sedan and wagon, five-speed transmission for the coupe. These cars were rear-wheel drive and had a semi-trailing arm rear suspension. The six-cylinder station wagon variant, only sold in North America, had a rear live axle to handle extra weight. Some fuel-injected versions had automatic transmissions.

The two-door coupé version was introduced in North America in January 1979 for the 1979 model year. Around the same time, the 810 received an exterior refresh. The coupé version was never available in second generation 810/Maximas. The new Datsun 280ZX did not share much of the 810's chassis as thought, though the 810 was not available with that Z car's larger 2.8 L engine. The first use of the "Maxima" name happened on a domestic Japanese market luxury version of the Stanza, in August 1977.

== 910 series ==
Datsun/Nissan Bluebird 910
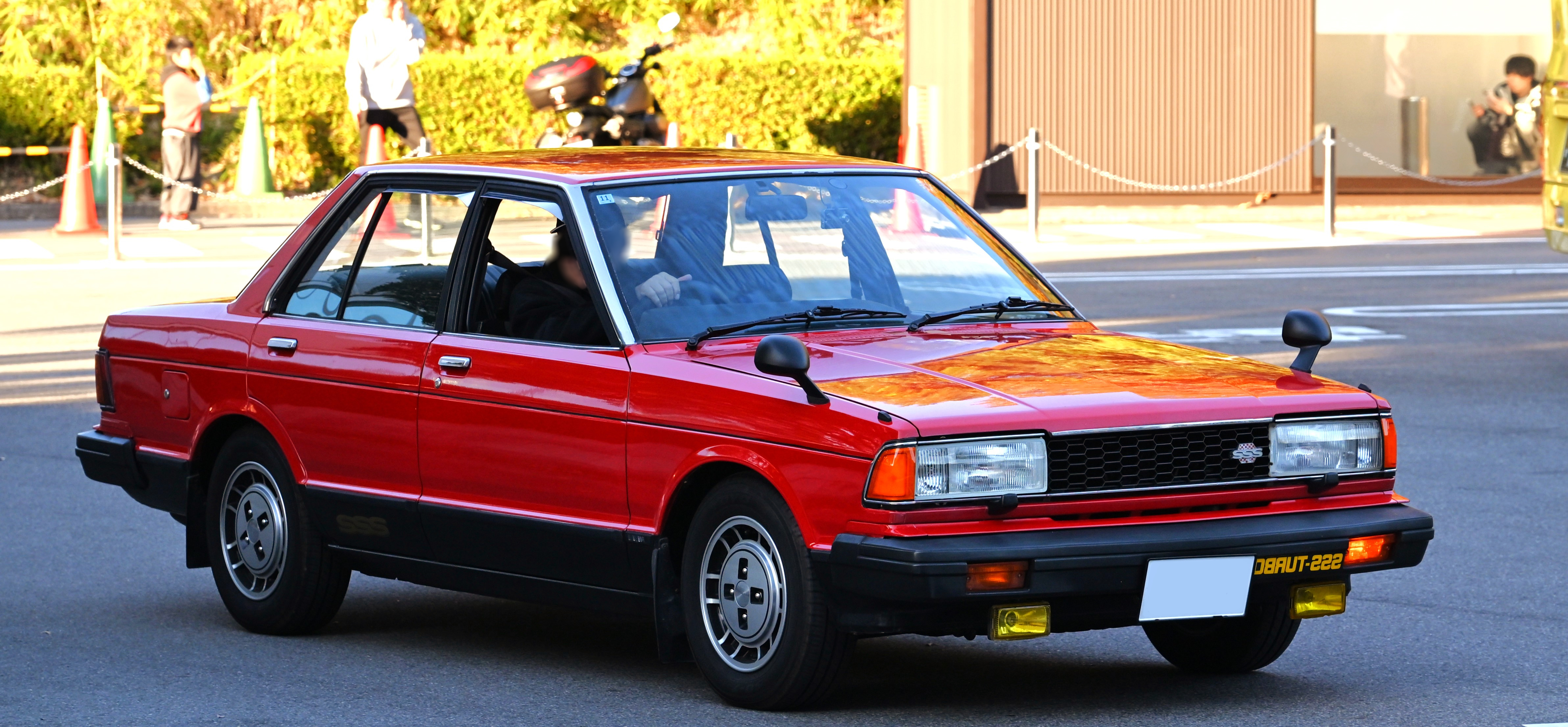

Overview
- Also called: Datsun 180/200B (GCC); Yue Loong Bluebird 911/912 (Taiwan)
- Production: 1979–1983; 1981–1986 (Australia)
- Assembly: Japan: Yokosuka, Kanagawa (Oppama Plant); Australia: Clayton, Victoria (Nissan Australia); New Zealand: Wiri (Nissan New Zealand); Taiwan: Miaoli (Yulon)

Body and chassis
- Body style: 4-door sedan; 5-door station wagon; 2-door coupé
- Layout: FR layout

The Bluebird 910, the last of the rear-wheel drive Bluebirds, featured simple clean-cut lines, unlike the "Coke Bottle" styling of its predecessor. It did however retain the same engine range, the same MacPherson strut suspension and the same 2,500 mm (98.4 in) wheelbase as the 810. Starting with this generation, in Japan the Bluebird returned to offering only four-cylinder vehicles, and the six-cylinder Bluebird was replaced by the Nissan Skyline based Nissan Leopard at Nissan Satio Store Japanese dealerships. Bluebirds of this generation were renowned for reliability but rusted away in salted areas long before the engine gave trouble. Nissan realigned with the Japanese Stanza/Auster/Violet sedans which were assigned to individual Japanese Nissan dealerships.

This car was also assembled in Australia, in South Africa, in Taiwan, and in New Zealand. This generation was also the basis of the North American Datsun/Nissan 810 Maxima from 1980 onwards.

In Europe, the Bluebird was joined in 1981 by the similar-sized Stanza, which gave Nissan buyers the alternative option of front-wheel drive and a hatchback body style for the first time, as front-wheel drive hatchbacks were by now overtaking rear-wheel drive saloons in popularity.

== U11 series ==
Nissan Bluebird U11
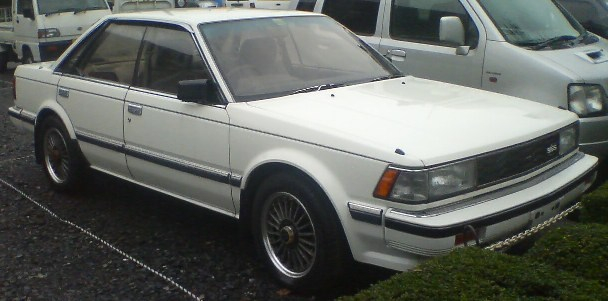
- Bluebird SSS-XG hardtop

Overview
- Also called: Tan Chong Bluebird; Yue Loong Bluebird 921/923
- Production: 1983–1987; 1984–1990 (wagon)
- Assembly: Japan: Yokosuka, Kanagawa (Oppama Plant); New Zealand: Auckland (Nissan New Zealand)

Body and chassis
- Body style: 4-door saloon/sedan; 4-door hardtop sedan; 5-door wagon/estate
- Layout: FF layout
- Related: Nissan Maxima

Powertrain
- Engine: 1598 cc CA16 I4 (RU11); 1809 cc CA18S/CA18E I4 (U11); 1809 cc CA18ET/DET turbo I4 (U11); 1973 cc CA20S/E I4 (YU11); 1998 cc VG20E/VG20ET V6 (PU11); 1952 cc LD20 diesel I4 (EU11); 1952 cc LD20T TD I4 (EU11)
- Transmission: 4/5-speed manual; 3/4-speed automatic

Dimensions
- Wheelbase: 2,550 mm (100.4 in)
- Length: 4,360–4,500 mm (171.7–177.2 in)
- Width: 1,690 mm (66.5 in)
- Height: 1,370–1,430 mm (53.9–56.3 in)
- Curb weight: 1,080–1,215 kg (2,381–2,679 lb)

Chronology
- Successor: Nissan Avenir (wagon)

The Bluebird was modified to front-wheel drive in October 1983, but retained the boxy styling of its predecessor. At the time, Nissan's design chief believed this method of styling would remain popular. Even though every panel was changed and most details were considerably smoother, the drag coefficient remained a fairly high 0.39.

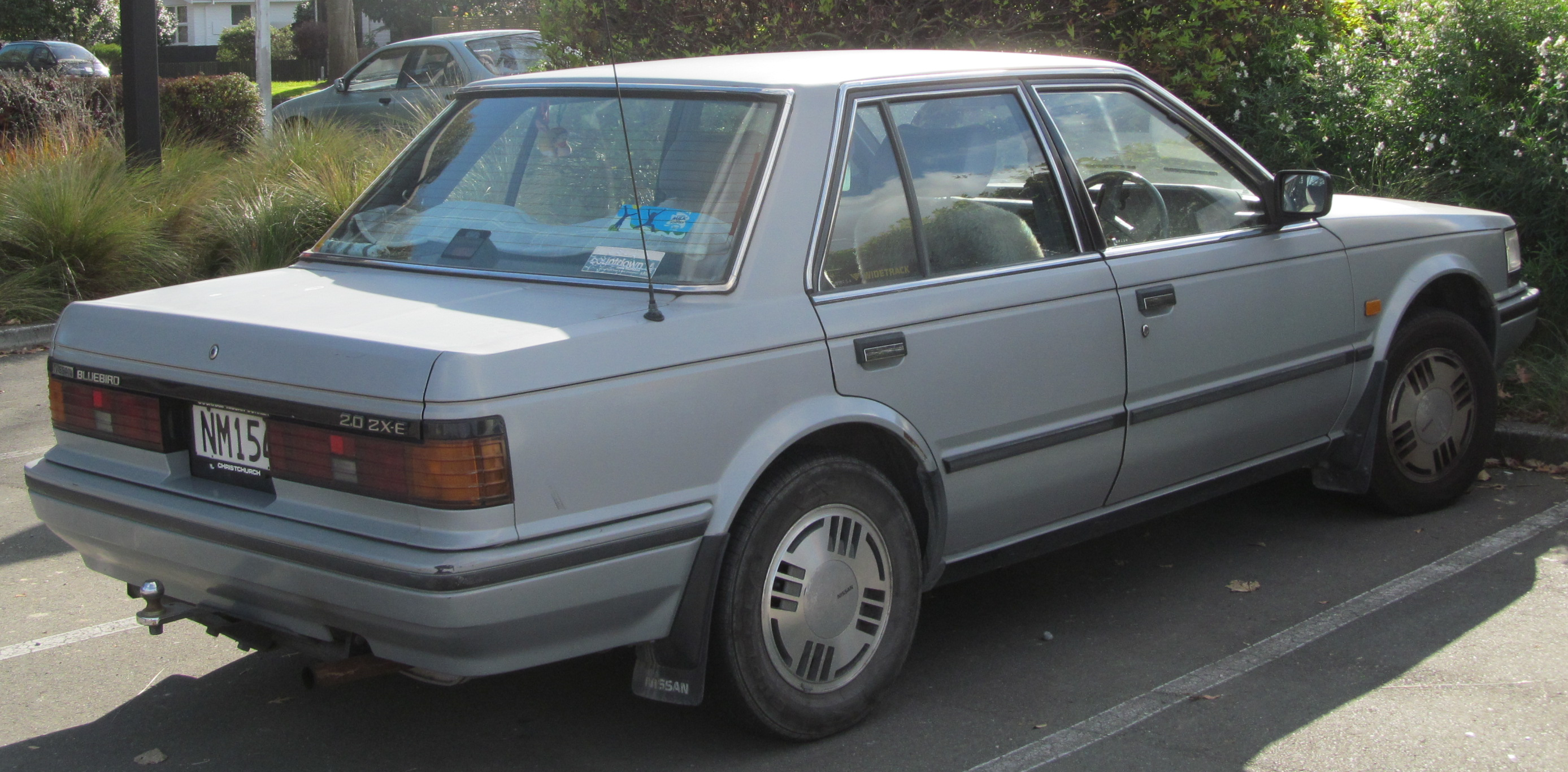
Nissan Bluebird 2.0 ZX-E (New Zealand)

The range was offered in four-door sedan, four-door hardtop, and five-door station wagon forms. The coupé was deleted, and the hardtop sedan is rarely seen outside Japan.

This model was offered in Europe for only two years before Nissan began building the Auster as the Bluebird at its newly opened plant in the UK in 1986. Certain Bluebird models (diesels and station wagons) continued to be offered alongside the T12 "Bluebird" in some markets. As usual, the Bluebird received ample standard equipment in European markets. In some markets, the petrol 2.0 was only available coupled to an automatic gearbox.

Although the U11 sedans were replaced for the 1988 model year, the station wagon continued to be built until 1990. The six-cylinder Maxima also continued to be built (without the "Bluebird" portion of the name from May 1987) until October 1988, when an all-new Maxima appeared. Most of the wagons sold in Japan were to commercial vehicle specifications, but a plusher Wagon was also offered. The "Bluebird Wagon SSS Turbo Wingroad" had a 120 PS (88 kW) 1.8-litre inline-four. It was the first car to receive the "Wingroad" name, in September 1987. The wagons/vans were built until May 1990, when they were replaced by the Nissan Avenir (Primera wagon in most export markets).

The range was available with 1.6, 1.8 and 2.0 L petrol engines, with the 1.8-litre four available with an optional turbocharger. The VG20ET V6 was offered for the first time in Japan in 1984, in a model with an extended front end, called the Bluebird Maxima. This 2-litre V6 was available naturally aspirated or as an intercooled turbo. The U11 Maxima featured a larger 3.0 L VG30E. There were also naturally aspirated or turbocharged 2-litre diesels. Counterintuitively, the turbodiesel had better gas mileage in standardized test cycles, presumably due to it being less stressed – as long as one did not take full advantage of its better performance.

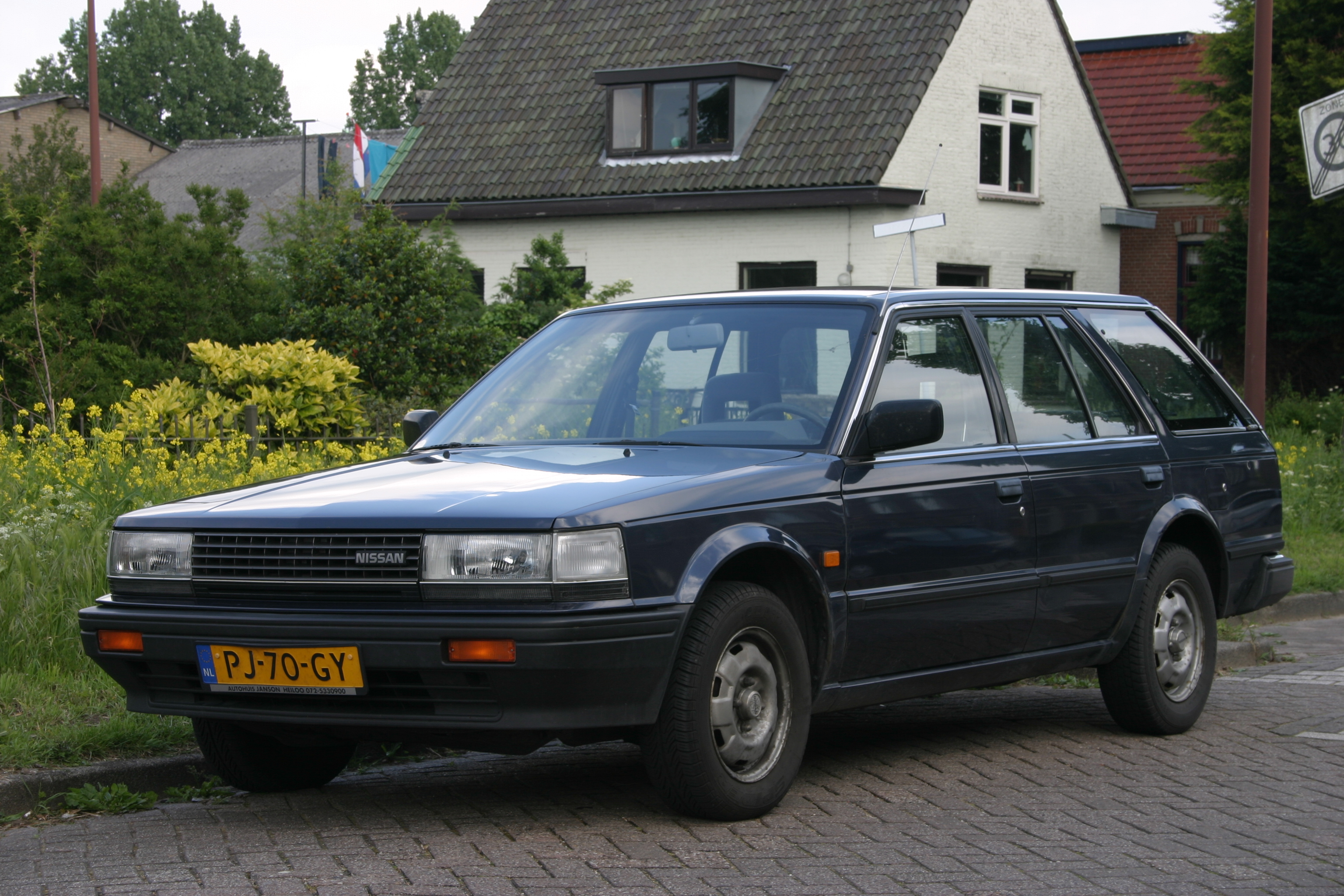
Bluebird 2.0 GL wagon (Europe)

Australia continued with the 910 series, which was facelifted in 1985. New Zealand marketing for the U11 proclaimed the vehicle as the 'Widetrack Bluebird', to differentiate it from its very similar-looking predecessor. Several Wiri-assembled models including a wagon were offered with 1.6 (base) or two-litre carburettor engines. The alloy head castings all had an unused location for a second spark plug per cylinder, as twin-plug, fuel-injected versions of the same engines were used in certain markets (US, Japan, Scandinavia) with stricter emission laws.

In the United Kingdom, the following versions were offered:

- 1.8 DX (1984–86)
- 2.0 GL/GL estate/SGL (1984–86)
- 1.8 Turbo ZX (1984–86)

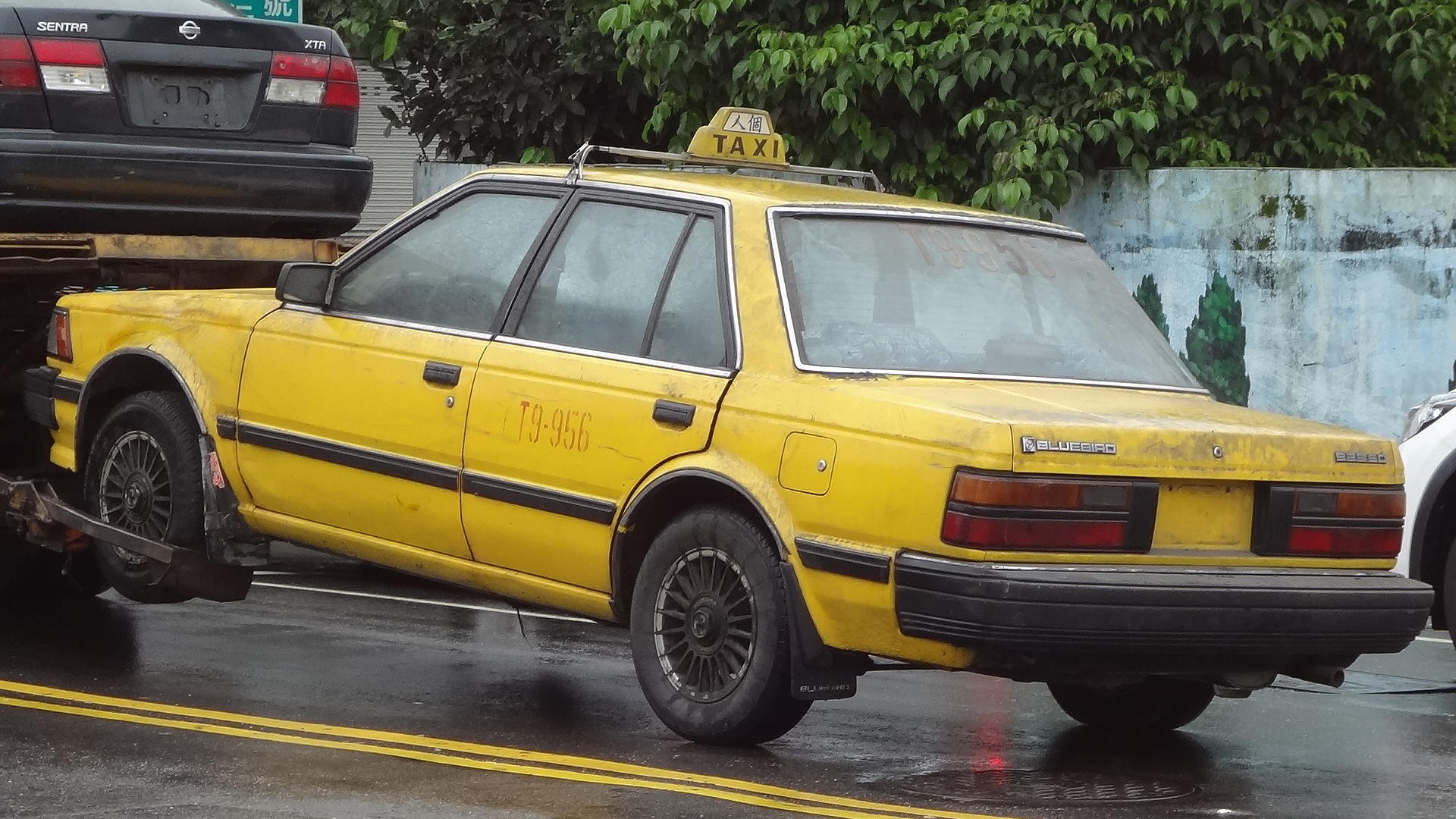
Yue Loong Bluebird 923SD (Taiwan)

The U11 was sold as the Yue Loong Bluebird 921 / 923 in Taiwan.

== T12/T72 series ==
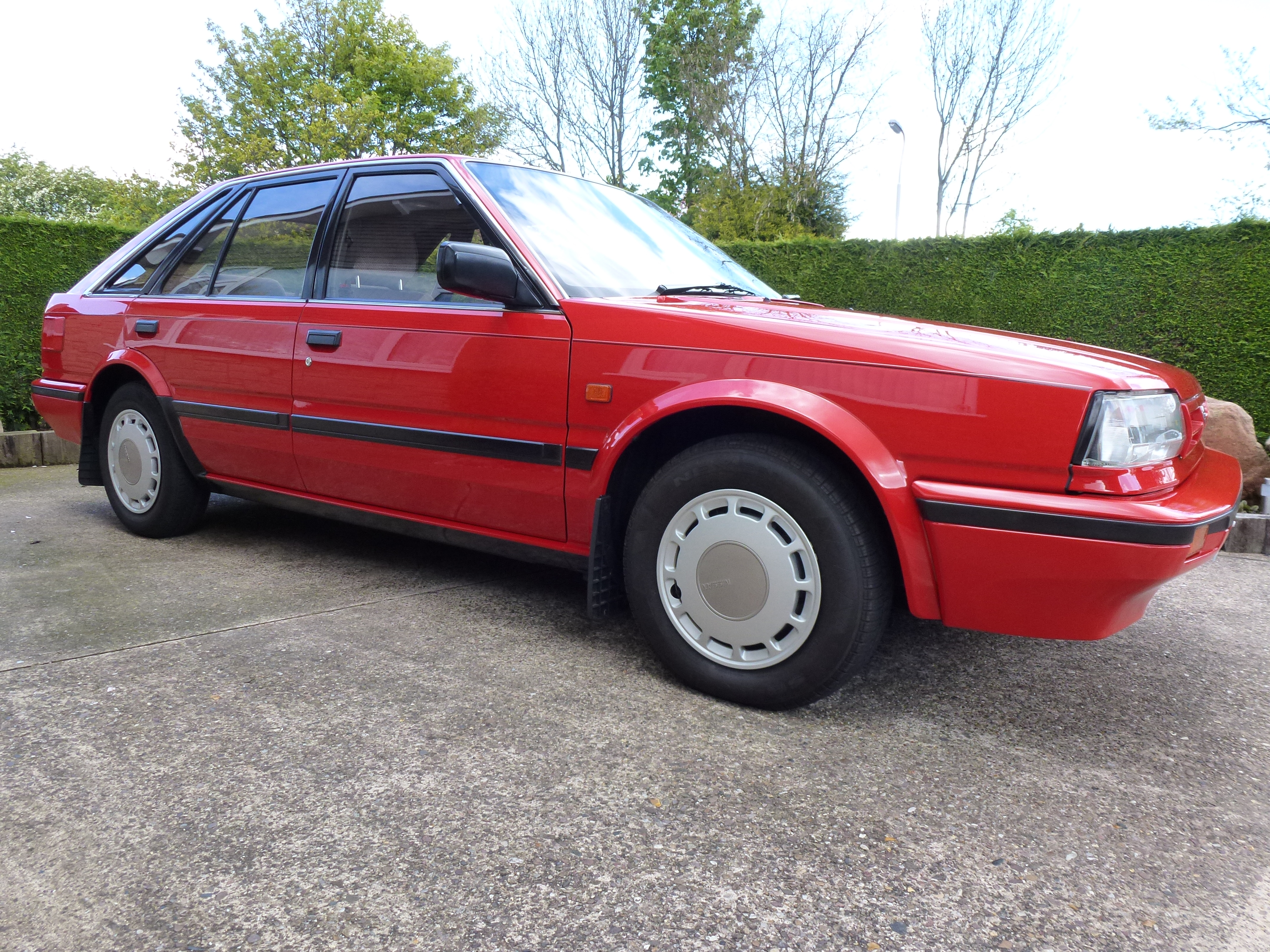
Bluebird T12/T72 Series

The T12 and the later T72 Nissan Bluebird, is a third-generation Auster, rebadged and sold in Europe. The T12 was introduced in Europe in 1985 as a replacement for the U11 Bluebird. From July 1986, the T12 was assembled from parts shipped in from Japan, at Washington, England. The saloon versions (four-door) were available first and the hatchback (five-door) became available in January 1987.

== U12 series ==
Nissan Bluebird U12
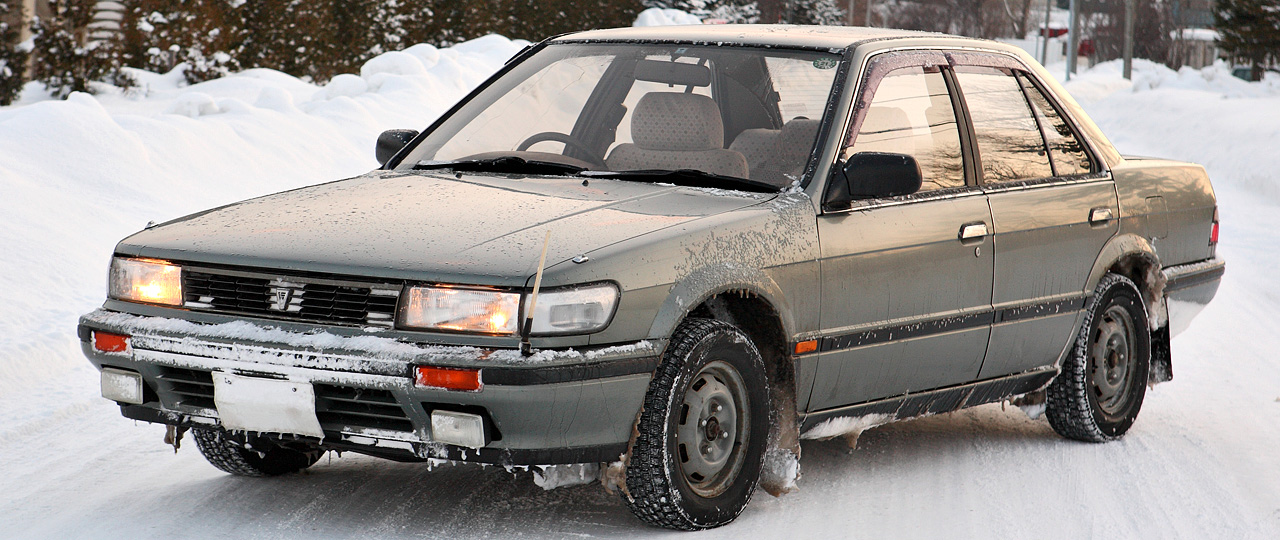

Overview
- Also called: Nissan Stanza (North America); Ford Corsair (AUS); Nissan Pintara (AUS)
- Production: 1987–1992
- Assembly: Japan: Yokosuka, Kanagawa (Oppama Plant)

Body and chassis
- Body style: 4-door saloon; 4-door hardtop saloon; 5-door hatchback (Bluebird Aussie)
- Layout: FF layout; F4 layout

Powertrain
- Engine: 1598 cc CA16S I4; 1809 cc CA18NS/CA18i/CA18DE I4; 1809 cc CA18DET/DET-R turbo I4; 1838 cc SR18Di I4; 1974 cc CA20E I4; 1998 cc SR20DE I4; 1998 cc SR20DET turbo I4; 2389 cc KA24E I4 (Pintara/Stanza); 1974 cc LD20 II diesel I4
- Transmission: 5-speed manual; 4-speed automatic

Dimensions
- Wheelbase: 100.4 in (2,550 mm)
- Length: 1990–91: 4.57 m (179.9 in); 1992: 4.59 m (180.7 in)
- Width: 1.70 m (66.9 in)
- Height: 1.37 m (54.1 in)
- Curb weight: 1265 kg (2788 lb)

Nissan replaced the boxy U11 in September 1987 with the U12 series, offered in four-door sedan and four-door hardtop body types. It was designed to have a rounded appearance in comparison to the previous generation. The hardtop sedan was later fitted with a centre "B" pillar structure to increase body stiffness. The top level car was the V6 VG20ET "Bluebird Maxima" station wagon from the previous generation U11 series and was still in production at the introduction of this generation.

The various grade configurations included the traditional "SSS" (SSS / twincam SSS / twincam SSS-X). In addition to the SSS series, the Bluebird wagon was replaced by the Nissan Avenir, and the sedans (LE / SE Saloon / XE Sedan / Super-select) were also available. The entry level 1600LE (five-speed manual transmission) started out at ¥1,198,000 to the top level Twin Cam Turbo 1800 cc offered on the SSS Attesa Limited (four-speed automatic) starting at ¥2,998,000 in sedan, and Hard Top bodystyles and boasted a wide variety of equipment and different combinations and grades. At the time of introduction, there was also the limited production SSS-R model, with lowered weight and a special high-power engine as well as oversized extra headlamps and racing livery.

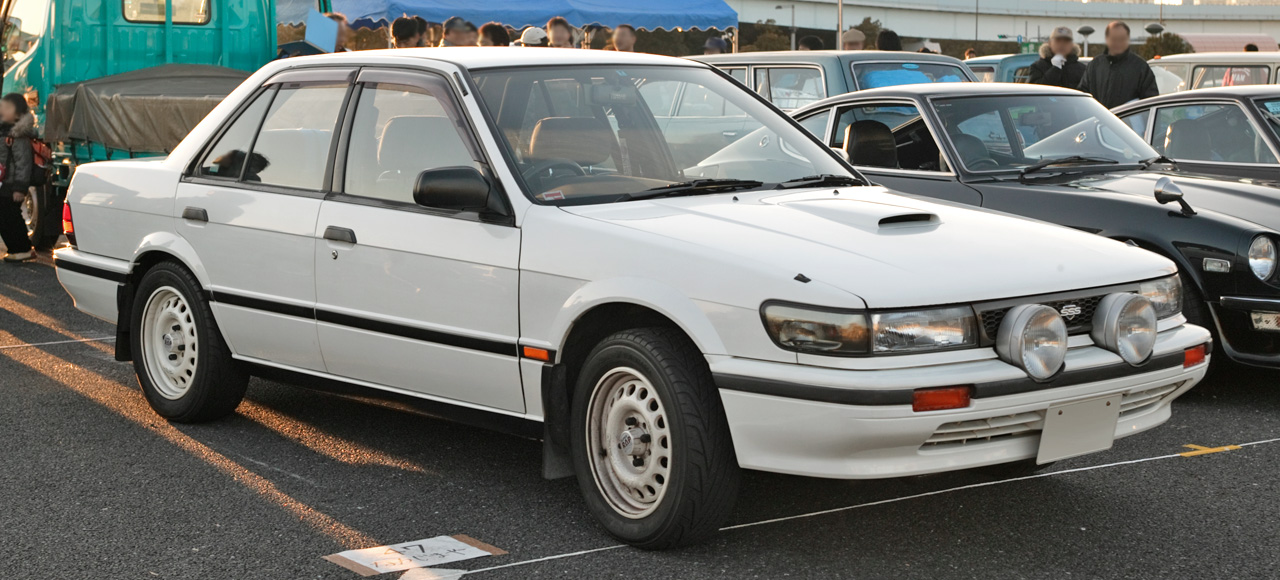
The Bluebird SSS-R, intended for competition

Innovations for the U12 included the introduction of Nissan's mechanical four-wheel-drive system, called ATTESA and the ever-popular SR20DET engine which was introduced in the series 2 (HNU12) bluebirds (1989–1991). With the Maxima having been spun off into its own range, U12 Bluebirds were all four-cylinder models, with either a 1.6-, 1.8-, or 2.0-litre petrol engine and also the option of the LD20 2.0-litre diesel. The sports and luxury versions came with a factory viscous LSD. Nissan made a turbocharged Bluebird from 1987 to 1990 named the RNU12, using the 1809 cc DOHC CA18DET that was sold in Japan and New Zealand. It, too used the ATTESA system.

In October 1989 the U12 Bluebird was facelifted, receiving new rear lamps and other minor external changes. More importantly, the 1.8-litre engines were switched from the somewhat noisy old CA family to the new SR engines displacing 1.8 or 2.0 litres. The base 1.6 engine remained the carburetted 79 PS (58 kW) CA16S. There was only a single 1.8, the single-point injected SR18Di with 110 PS (81 kW), a significant increase over the 88 PS (65 kW) CA18i. This was also available with the ATTESA system, in either XE or SE trim. Beginning in November 1990, Nissan managed to fit an FE ATTESA trim level between the two existing ones. In May 1991 the "Bluebird Aussie" went on sale, a rebadged Pintara Superhatch (see below for Australian production). It only remained on sale until the next generation Bluebird was introduced in August 1991, and so only 1,300 of these cars were sold in Japan. Unlike Australian-market cars, the Bluebird Aussie came equipped with a Japanese-spec SR20DE engine.

=== Export markets ===
The U12 was also sold in North America as the Nissan Stanza.

Australia and New Zealand

This model was sold as the Nissan Pintara in Australia, replacing a larger Skyline-based model, from 1989 to 1993. There, it had been codenamed ‘Project Matilda’, leading the press to speculate it was a car developed uniquely for Australia — which was not the case. In Japan, a four-door sedan and four-door hardtop were offered, although Nissan of Australia did create a five-door Pintara 'Superhatch' model that was sold as the Bluebird in some export markets, including New Zealand. It was marketed as the 'Bluebird Aussie' in Japan, selling complete with a fluffy little koala, an Australian flag under the clock and other small touches.

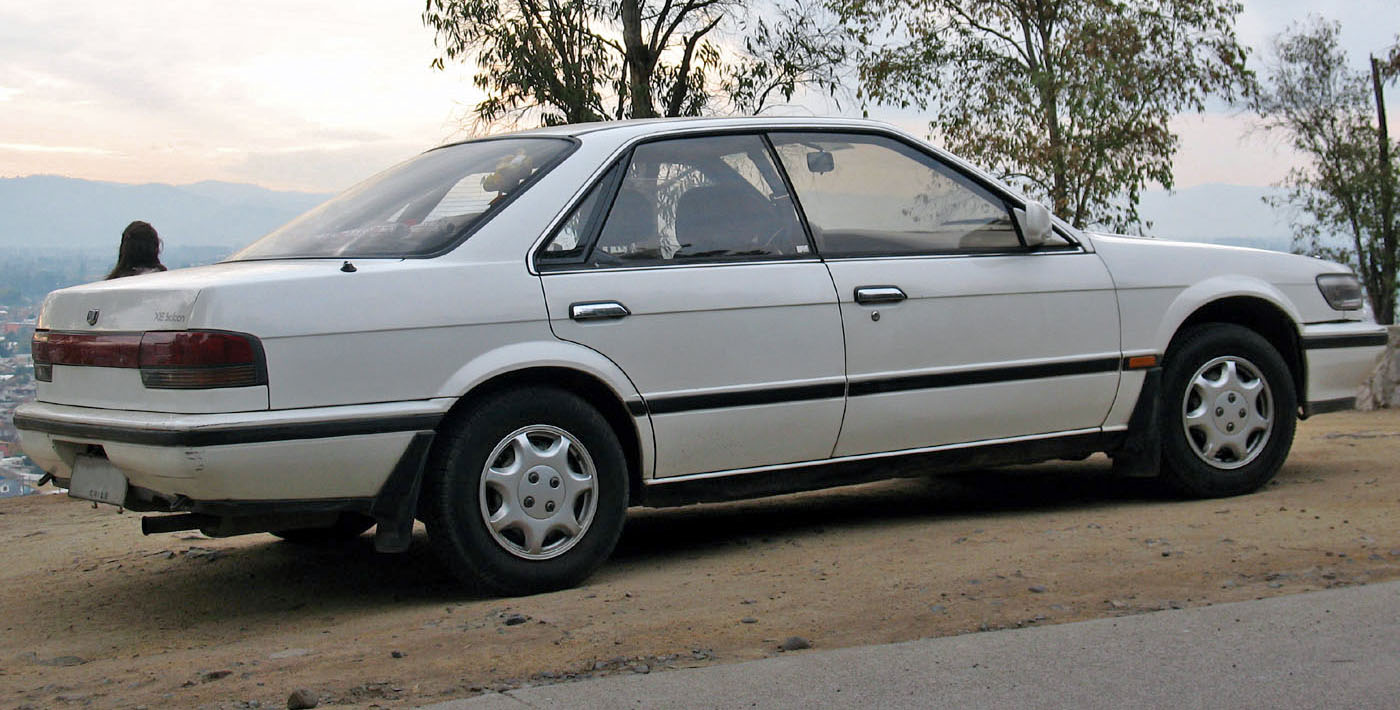
A 1989 Hardtop, with different bodywork behind the A-pillar

Australian models came with the CA20E SOHC 2.0l EFI and KA24E SOHC 2.4l EFI motors. Sadly for Nissan Australia, Project Matilda was not the success it had hoped, even with a twin built for Ford Australia called the Corsair, which was even less successful. This led to the collapse of Nissan’s Australian manufacturing operations in the early 1990s. Most of the early Bluebirds of this generation sold in New Zealand were again assembled locally from CKD kits, as had been the case with almost all NZ-bound cars since the first generation in the early 1960s. The Japanese-made, NZ-assembled cars were replaced by Australian made U12 sedans at 'facelift' time though the Kiwi-built U11 wagon, a body variant not made in Australia, carried on. NZ trim levels included SGS and ZX; like rival Toyota Australia, Nissan Australia, which ceased local manufacturing in 1994, was willing to build uniquely specified and badged models for its trans-Tasman customer.

Trim levels of the Australian U12 Pintara were as follows:

- GLi: 2.0 L manual 5 speed, high mounted brake light, AM/FM radio cassette
- Executive: 2.0 L auto 4-speed, as above plus, power steering, remote boot release
- T: 2.4 L manual or auto, as above plus 4-wheel disc brakes, tacho, split fold rear seat
- Ti: 2.4 L manual or auto, as above plus limited slip differential, cruise control, climate control, central locking, electric windows, graphic equaliser, fog lamps, alloy wheels
- TRX: 2.4 L manual or auto, as above plus sports seats, sports suspension, body kit, alarm, 6Jx14" alloy wheels (all other models have 5.5Jx14" wheels)

All models were available as a 4-door sedan and 5-door hatch, except the TRX, which was only available as a 4-door sedan. The Ford Corsair was available as a GL (CA20 engine) and Ghia (KA24, similar features as the Ti).

Malaysia

Local assemblers Tan Chong were losing the low-cost market to local upstart Proton in the mid-1980s (by 1986, Nissan sales in Malaysia were down 90 percent from their peak a few years earlier). To revive their fortunes, Tan Chong attempted to reposition the brand as "upmarket standard," taking on brands such as Honda. As a result, the U12 Bluebird was priced much higher than the preceding generation, and was also available with more equipment and in a more powerful, fuel injected 2-litre Super Select model. The 1974 cc CA20E engine produces 115 PS (85 kW) at 5600 rpm. There was also a carburetted 1.8 SE model available, equipped with the CA18NS engine.

Chile

U12 sales in Chile (expands)
	1.8 SE	2.0 SE	2.0i Super Select
1990	372	123	26
1991	241	79	19
1992	218	21	—
1993	9	—	—

In Chile the U12 Bluebird only arrived in 1990, as the U11 generation had remained available until then. It was available with the carburetted CA18NS or 2-litre CA20S with SE Saloon equipment, as well as the same fuel injected CA20E engine for the Super Select as used in Malaysia and other markets with minimal emissions regulations. Outputs are 89, 96 and 115 PS (65, 71 and 85 kW). A five-speed manual was standard, with a three-speed automatic available in the 1.8 and a four-speed auto for the 2-litre models.

== U13 series ==
Nissan Bluebird U13
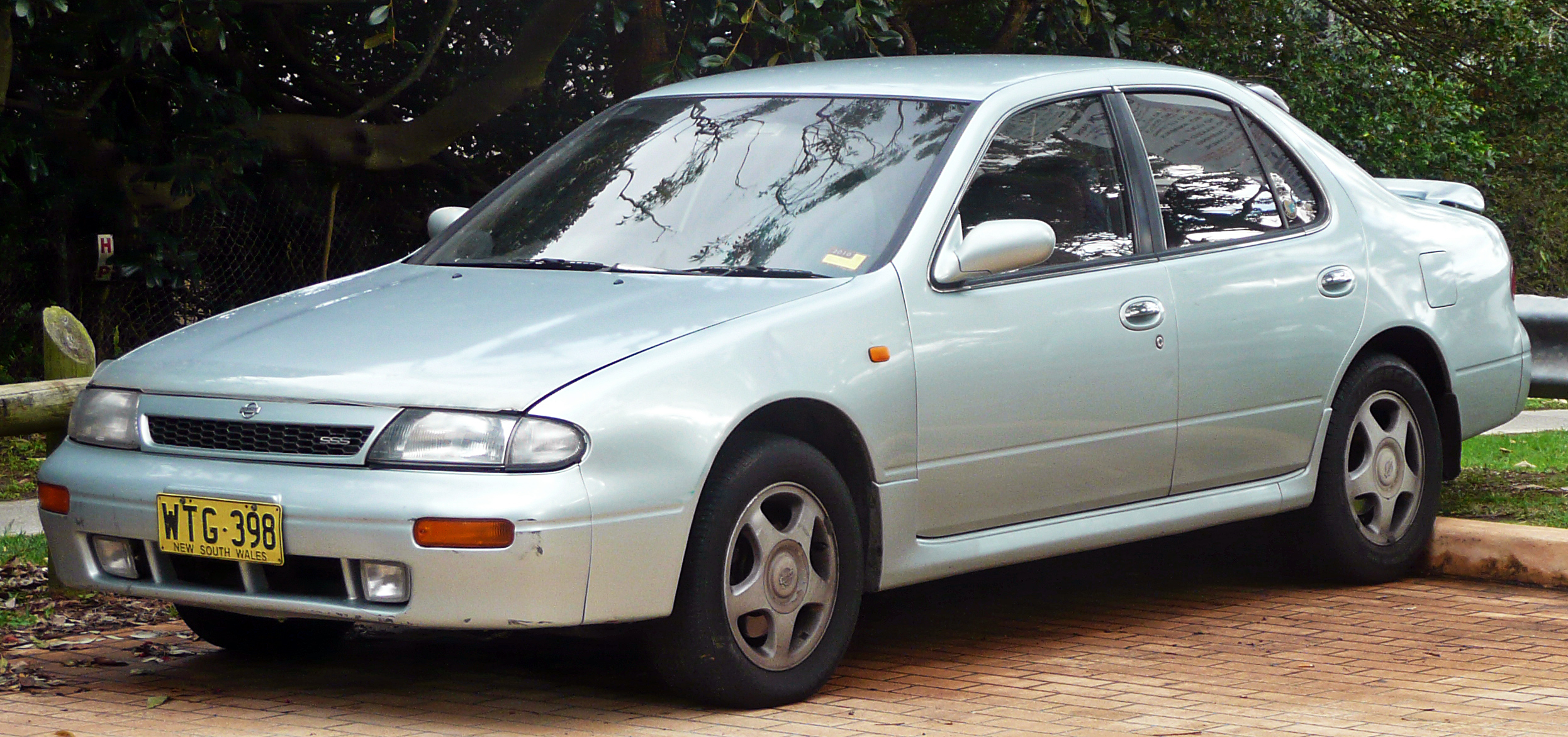

Overview
- Also called: Nissan Altima (U13); Fengshen EQ7200 (China); Yunbao YB7200 (China)
- Production: 1991–1997; 1999–2007 (China)
- Assembly: Japan: Yokosuka, Kanagawa (Oppama Plant); China: Xiangfan

Body and chassis
- Body style: 4-door sedan; 4-door hardtop
- Layout: FF layout; F4 layout

Powertrain
- Engine: 1.6 L GA16DS DOHC I4; 1.8 L SR18DE DOHC I4; 2.0 L SR20DE DOHC I4; 2.0 L EQ486 DOHC I4 (China); 2.0 L SR20DET DOHC turbo I4; 2.4 L KA24DE DOHC I4; 2.0 L CD20 diesel I4
- Transmission: 5-speed manual transmission; 4-speed automatic

Dimensions
- Wheelbase: 2,620 mm (103.1 in)
- Length: 4,585 mm (180.5 in)
- Width: 1,695 mm (66.7 in)
- Height: 1,405 mm (55.3 in)
- Curb weight: 1,070–1,370 kg (2,360–3,020 lb)

The U13 series was launched in Japan in September 1991 as a four-door sedan and four-door pillared hardtop. The two models were visually distinct: the four-door sedan had curves where its U12 predecessor had edges, while the hardtop, called the Nissan Bluebird ARX, had more traditional styling. The Bluebird wagon was replaced by the new Nissan Avenir. This series replaced the Stanza/Auster/Violet platform expansion that enabled Nissan to sell a Bluebird-sized product at Nissan's Japanese dealership network, as the economic effects of the collapse of the Japanese asset price bubble began to unfold in Japan. Projected production for 1992 was 15,000 cars per month, 13,000 of which were intended for the Japanese domestic market.

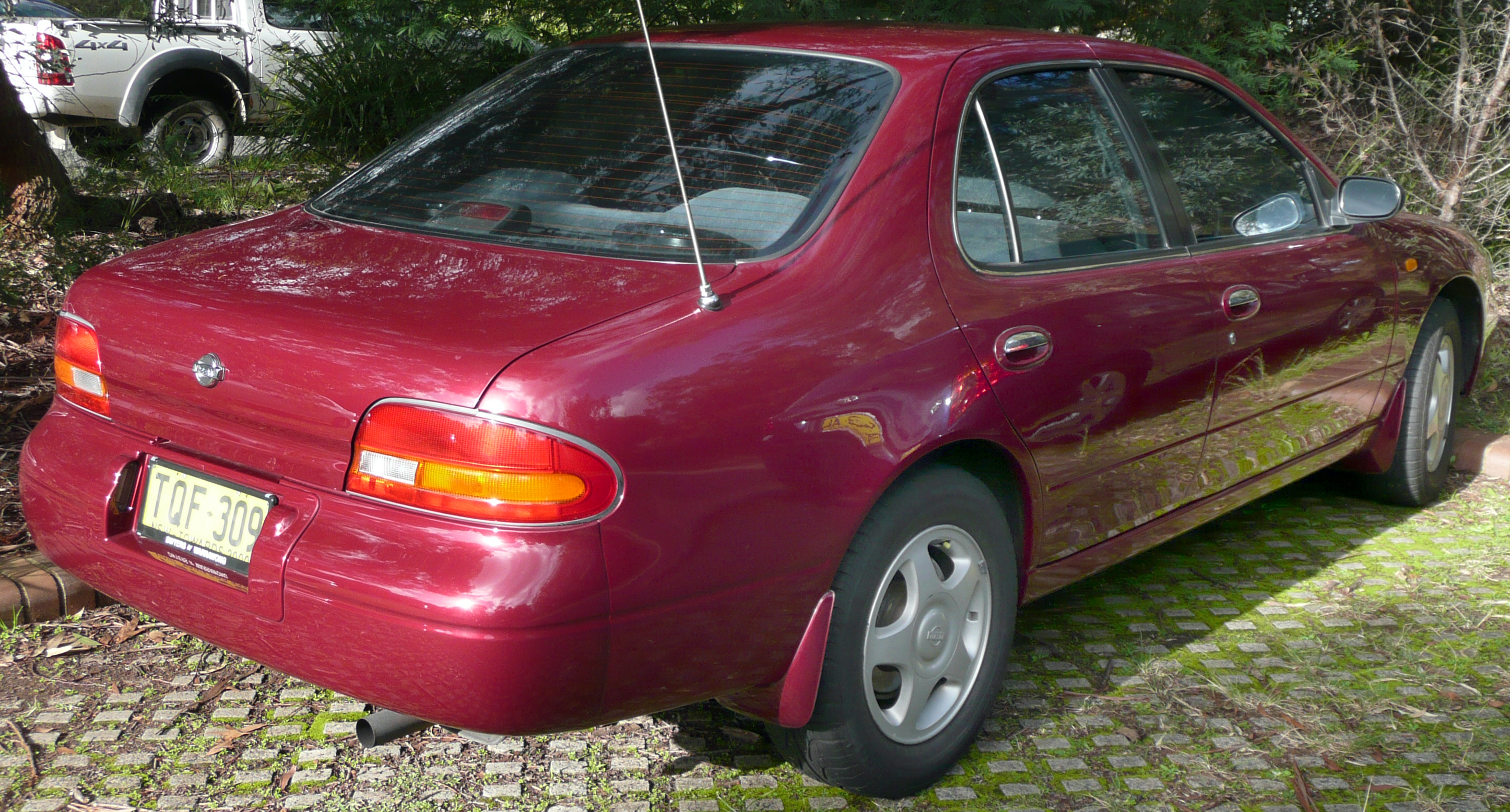
1995–97 Nissan Bluebird (U13) LX sedan (Australia)

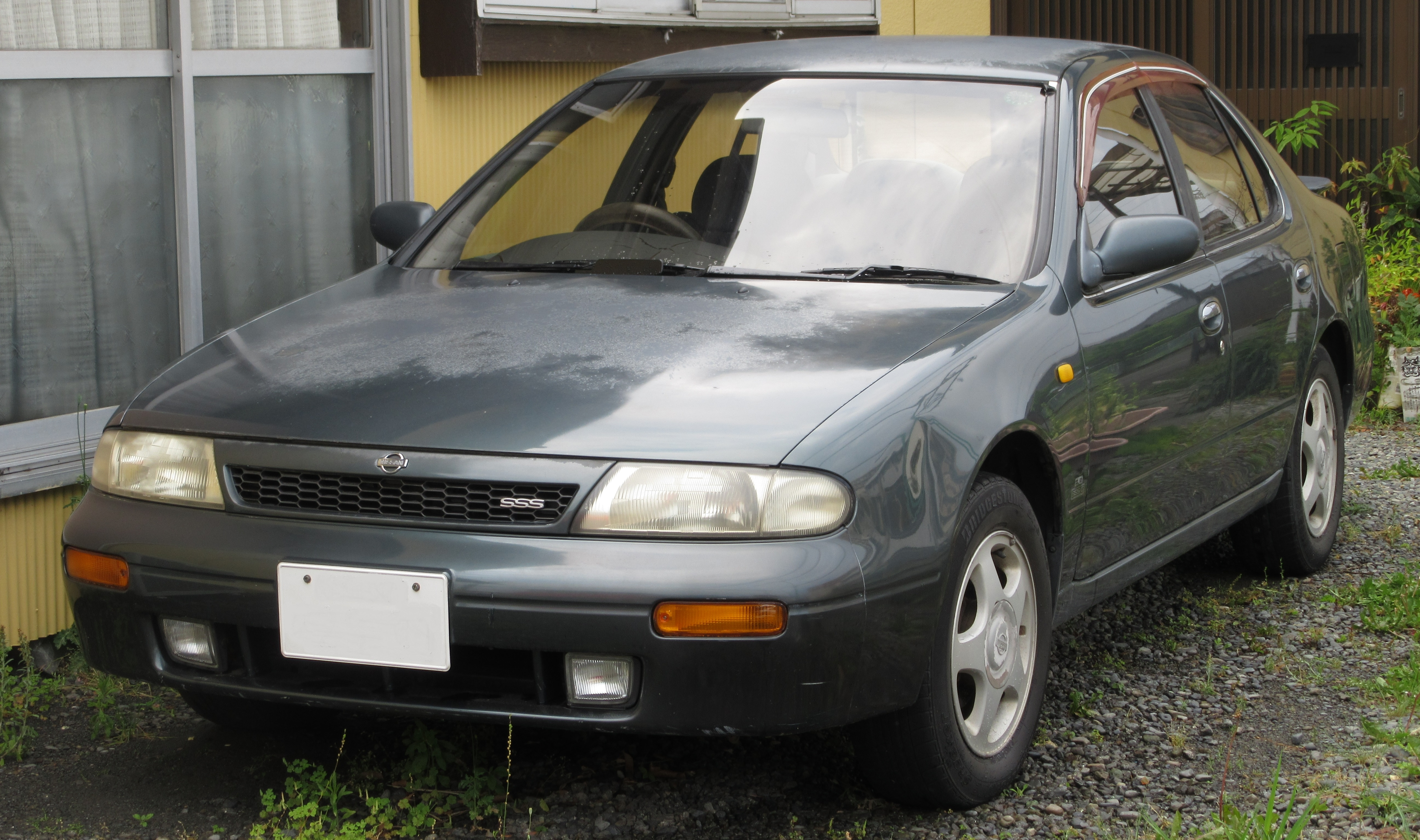
1991 Nissan Bluebird (U13) SSS ATTESA sedan (Japan)

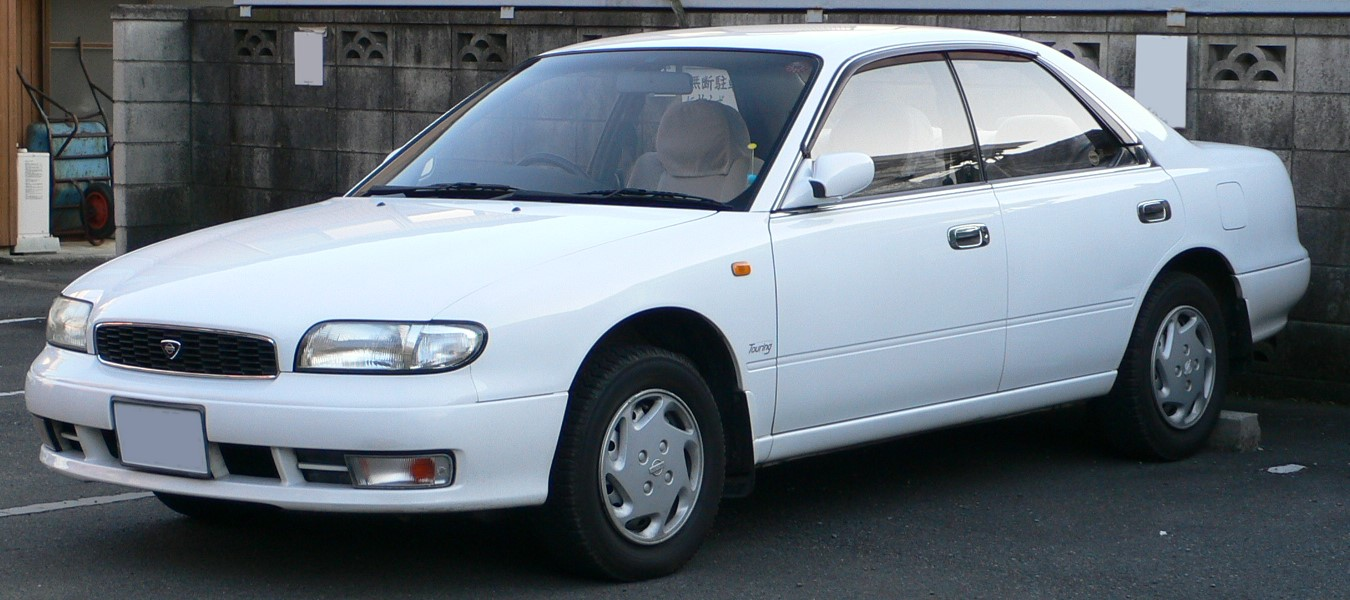
1991 Nissan Bluebird (U13) ARX hardtop sedan (Japan)

The new Bluebird was designed with comfort in mind. The more spacious cabin was the result of a longer wheelbase and a slightly taller design, in a package retaining the length and width of the previous model. Another piece of equipment for comfort was the Active Noise Cancellation (ANC) system available in domestic market Hardtop models. This was the first installation of such a system, although its effect was limited and it was to be another twenty years before it reached wider adoption.

Several Japanese models included an All Wheel Drive version (ATTESA). The engines used in the Japanese models ranged greatly in capacity and type. The SSS Attesa LTD model used a "redtop" SR20DET with 210 PS (154 kW). This was a similar engine/drivetrain package to the more powerful one used in the Pulsar GTi-R. It had only a single throttle body as opposed the GTi-R's multiple throttle body, smaller bearings, hydraulic rather than solid lifters, and a smaller turbo. The GTi-R had a large top mount intercooler, while the SSS ATTESA LTD had a smaller front mount intercooler. The Bluebird SSS was set apart from the North American Altima in that not only having the SR20DET and AWD Attesa as an option, it also had other details such as power folding retracting mirrors (some heated) and a rear wiper if equipped with a spoiler. US cars are also larger due to the fitment of bigger bumpers.

=== Export markets ===
The Australian delivered U13 Bluebird was released in late 1993 and terminated in 1997. Series 1 ran from 1993 until 1995 while Series 2 ran from 1995 to 1997. Series 2 saw the addition of a driver's airbag, revised grille styling, and a seat belt warning light. The Series 1 LX model came equipped with cruise control standard but strangely it was an option on the Series 2.

The Australian U13 Bluebirds were available in three different models, LX—the base model but very well equipped, Ti—the luxury model, and the SSS—the sports model. Compared to the LX, the Ti had climate control, a sunroof, woodgrain styling, and gear selector display on the instrument cluster (automatic models only). while comparing the LX to the SSS, the SSS had a HUD (heads-up display—digital speedo on windscreen), climate control, fog lights, ski-port, woodgrain styling, and gear selector display on the instrument cluster (automatic models only). Despite there being a sports model (SSS), the LX was the fastest of the Australian models due to having the least weight. The engine used in the Australian and US U13 models was the KA24DE with 112 kW (152 PS) and 210 Nm of torque).

The U13 Bluebird was introduced in New Zealand in early 1993, and was produced at Nissan's assembly plant in South Auckland from CKD packs imported from Japan until 1997, when it was replaced by the Primera. The model received much praise for its handling roadholding, with some models benefitting from the Attesa's passively steered rear wheels. New Zealand models were; S (base model, not available until later), SE (mid-spec), SES (sport) and SEL (luxury). Several versions of the sedan, including the first local Bluebird to have standard factory-fitted air conditioning (automatic climate control in this case) and optional locally supplied leather upholstery. At launch, some local motoring writers criticised Nissan NZ's decision to fit luxury equipment items instead of airbags in top versions but the company insisted there was not yet sufficient retail or fleet buyer demand.

The US-built U13 (Nissan Altima) was released in 1993 and was similar to the Australian U13.

=== EQ7200 series ===
Nissan Motor signed an agreement with Dongfeng Motor Co., Ltd. of China, to build the Bluebird there in the early 2000s. It was the U13 model that was chosen, and is sold there as the Fengshen (Aeolus) Bluebird.

Yulon Motor, the Taiwan-based automaker, developed this variant of the U13, called the EQ7200-II series, in 2001. This featured a U13 central section but heavily revised front and rear ends with tail lamps and trunk lid design derived from the L30 Altima. However, the centre of the car remains the same, and the 2,620-millimetre (103 in) wheelbase is retained.

The EQ7200-I, which basically kept the look and specs of facelifted Bluebird U13 SSS, commenced production in 1999 and lasted until 2002 being replaced by the EQ7200-II. The EQ7200-II was built from 2001 to 2003, when it was replaced by a revised EQ7200-III model. The EQ7200-III was sold from 2003 to 2007.

The car is marginally longer at 4,664 millimetres (183.6 in), as opposed to the original U13's 4,585 millimetres (180.5 in). These Chinese models used a Chinese built SR20DE called EQ486.

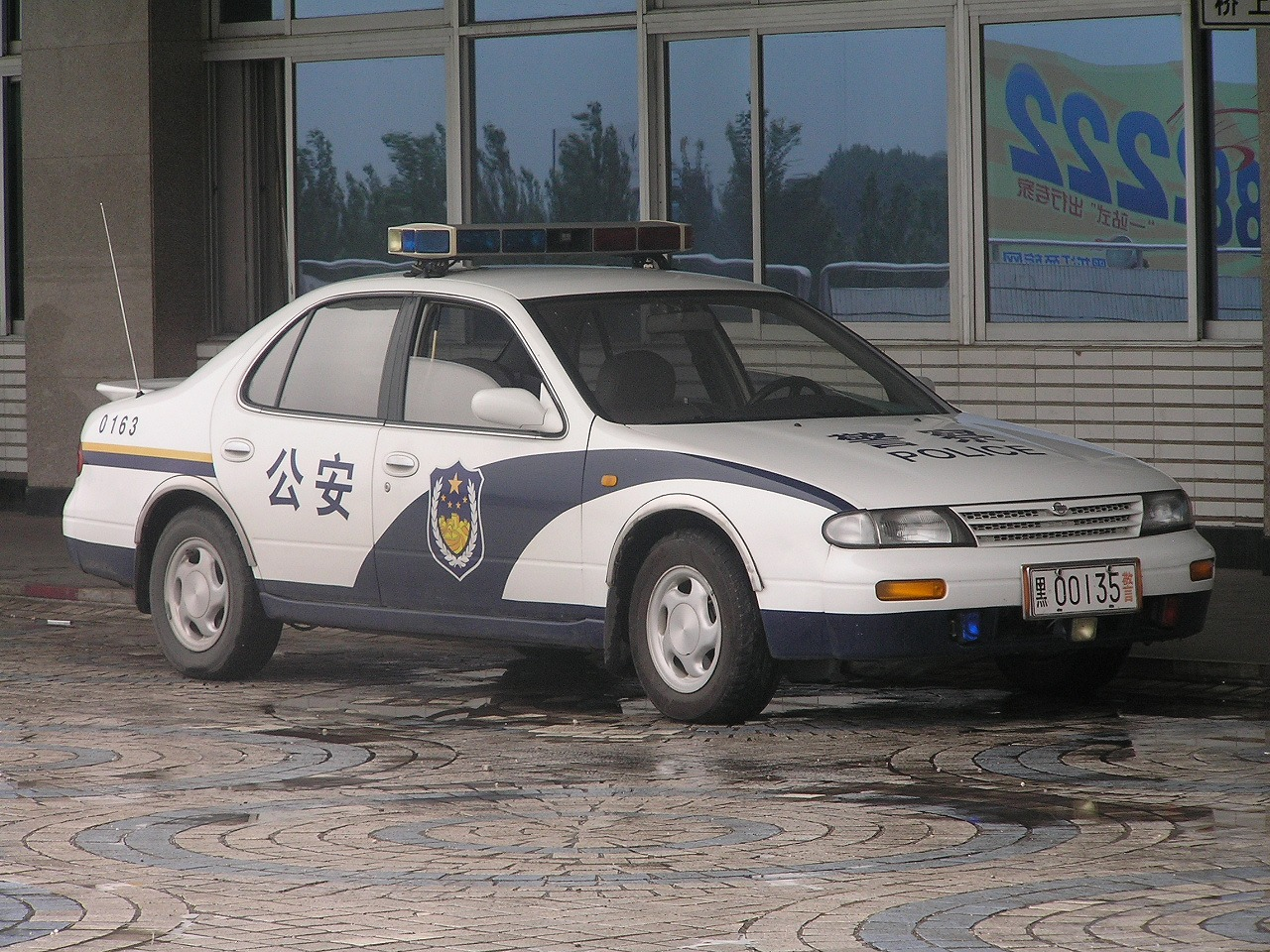
Fengshen EQ7200-I

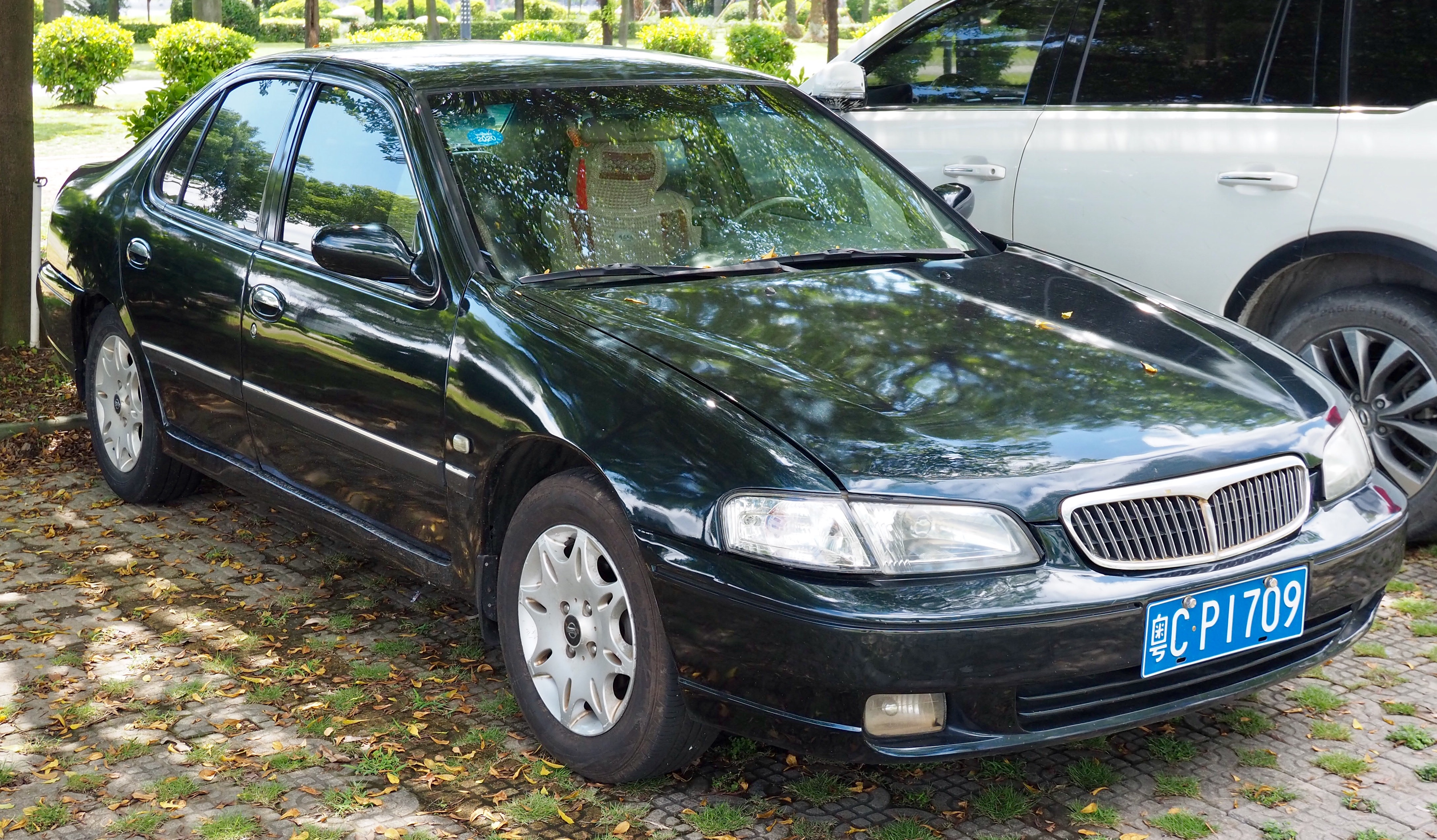
Aeolus Bluebird EQ7200-II

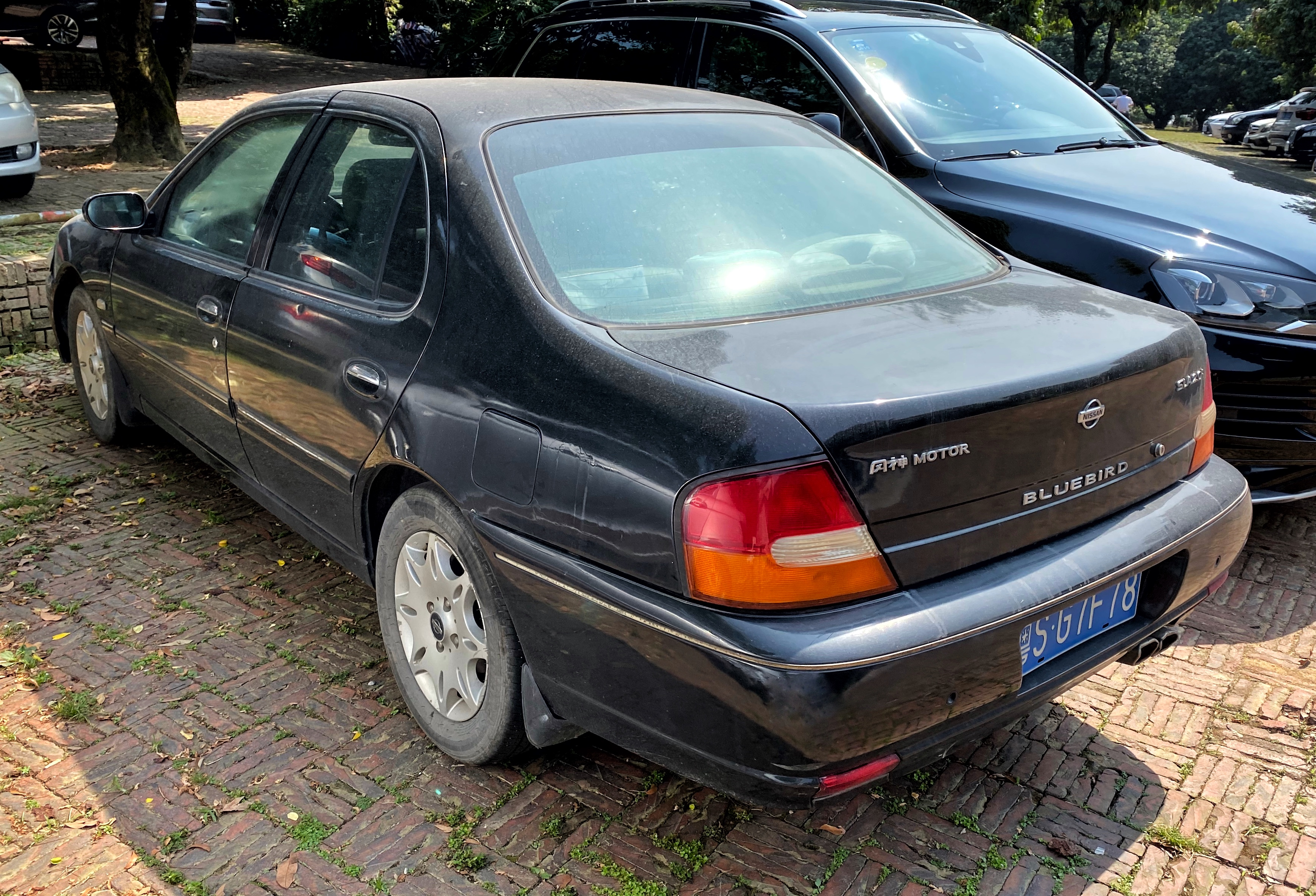
Aeolus Bluebird EQ7200-II

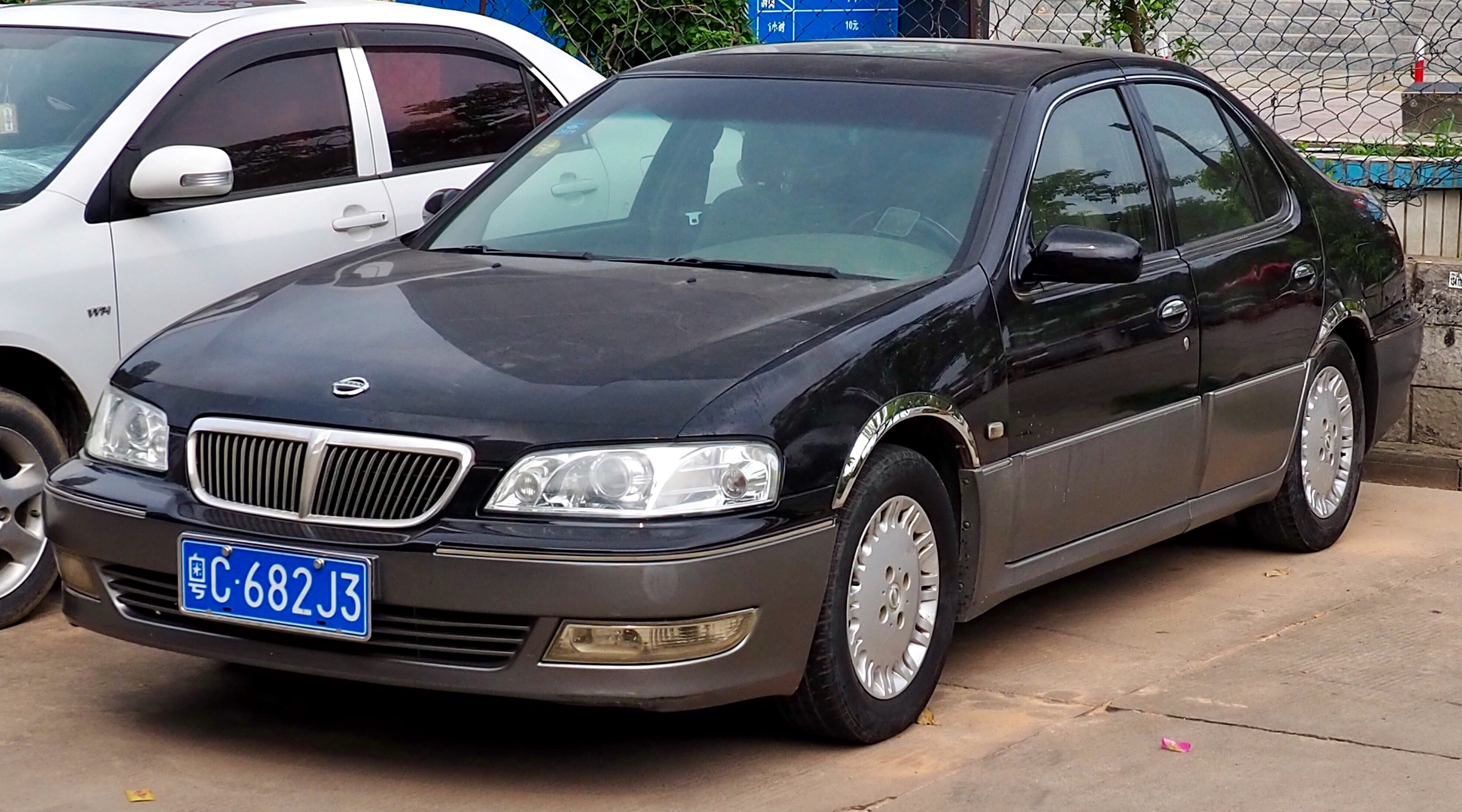
Aeolus Bluebird EQ7200-III

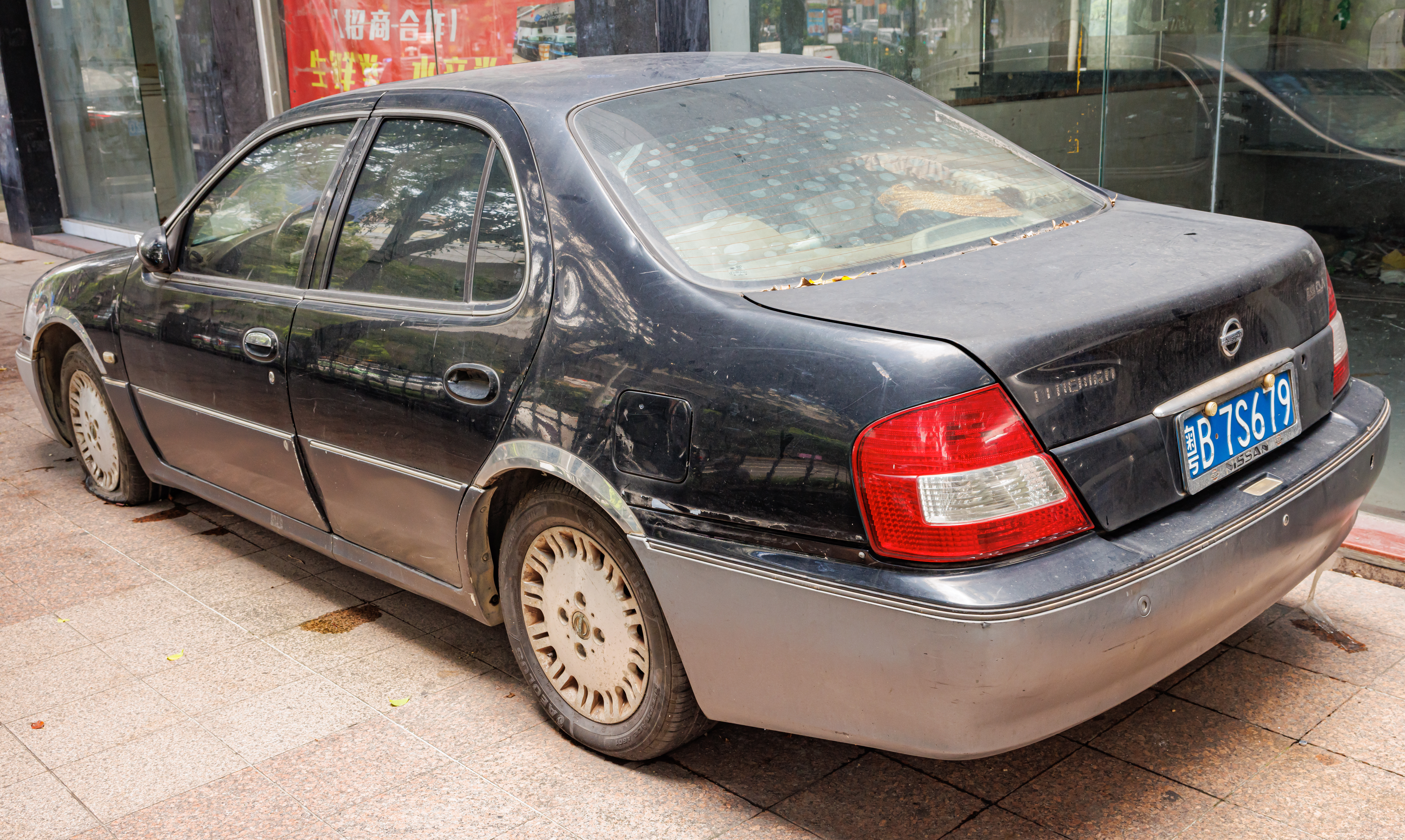
Aeolus Bluebird EQ7200-III

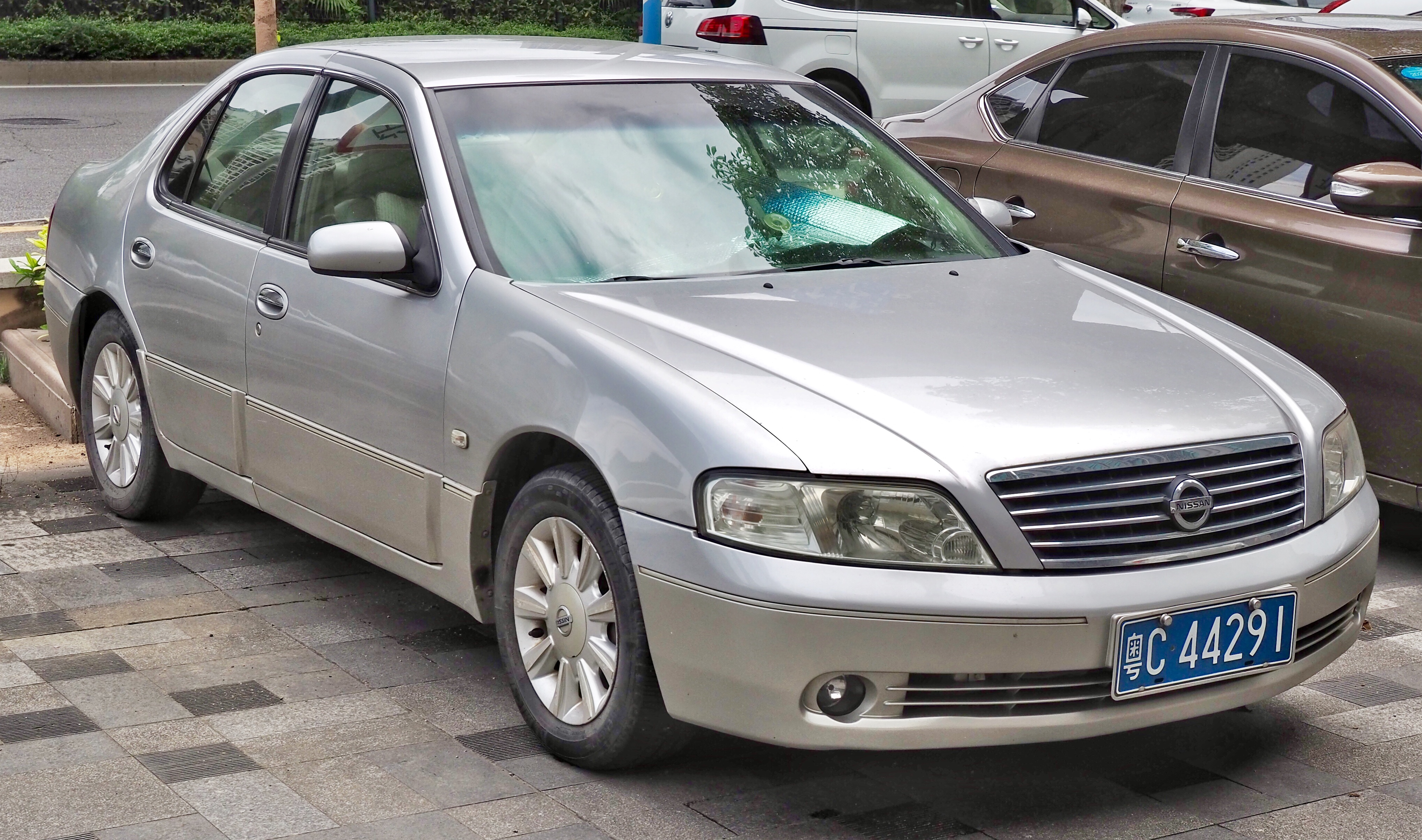
Bluebird Zhizun Deluxe (EQ7200D)

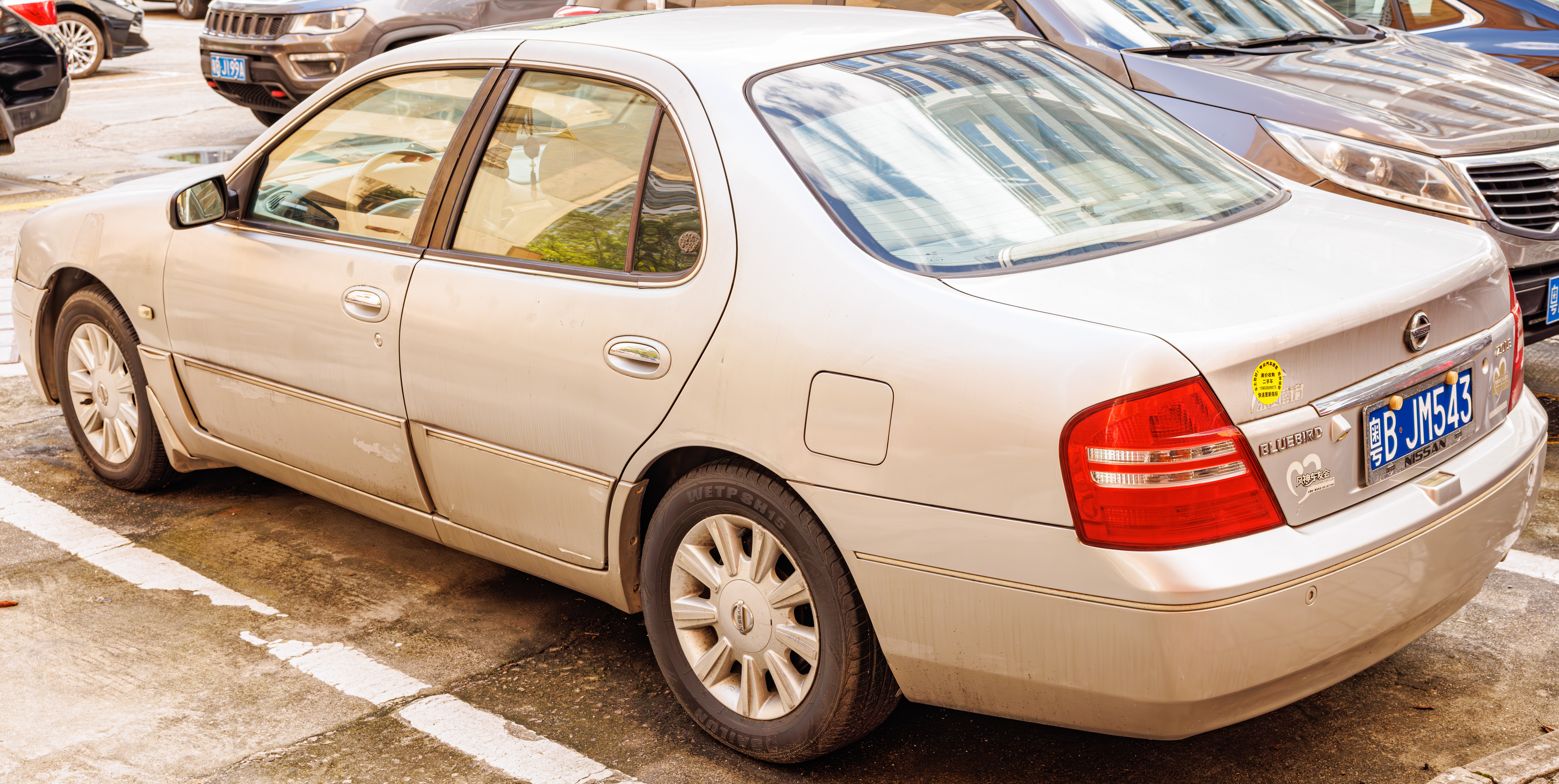
Bluebird Zhizun Deluxe (EQ7200D)

== U14 series ==
Nissan Bluebird U14
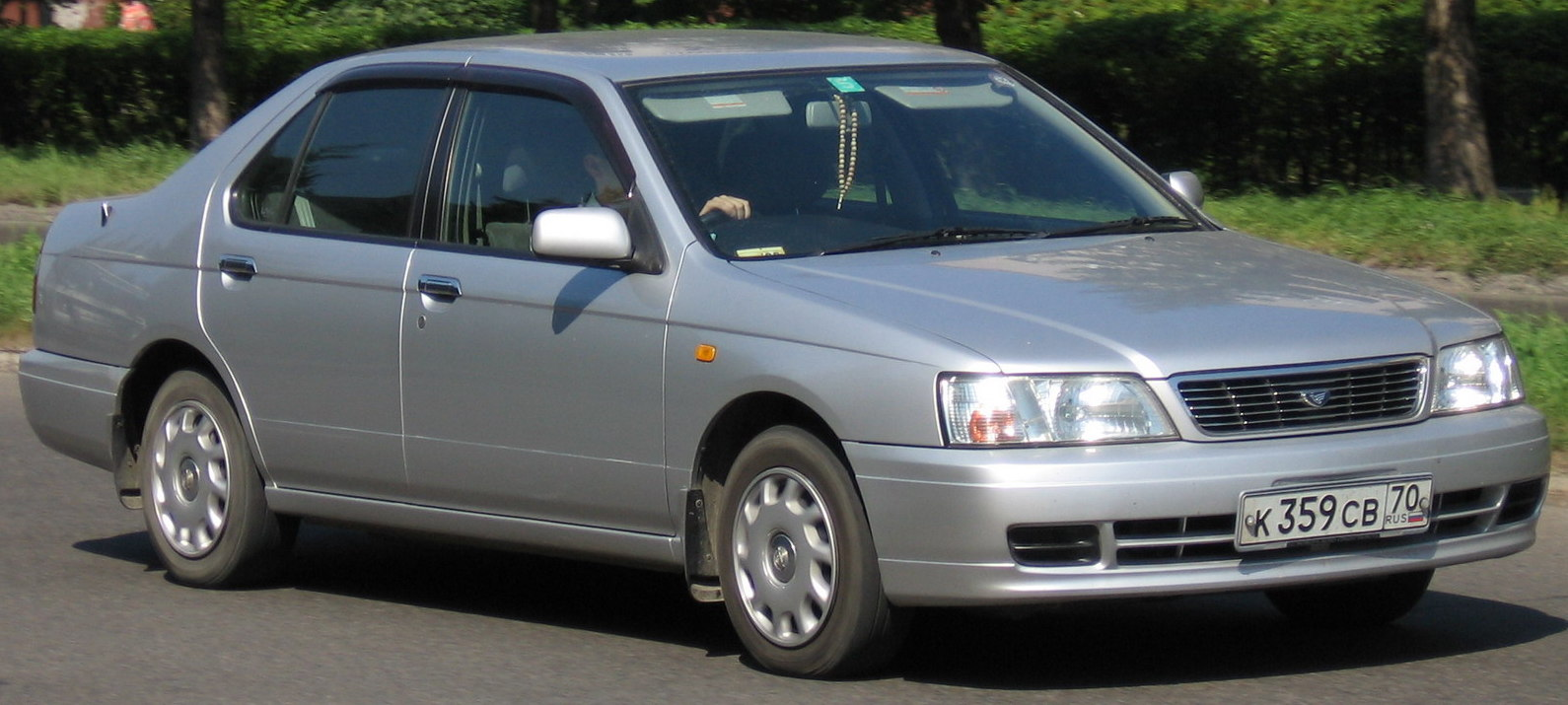

Overview
- Production: January 1996 – August 2001
- Assembly: Japan: Yokosuka, Kanagawa (Oppama Plant)

Body and chassis
- Body style: 4-door sedan
- Layout: FF layout; F4 layout

Powertrain
- Engine: 1.8 L SR18DE DOHC I4; 1.8 L QG18DE DOHC I4; 2.0 L SR20DE DOHC I4; 2.0 L SR20VE VVL DOHC I4; 2.0 L CD20E diesel I4
- Transmission: 5 speed manual; 4 speed automatic; CVT automatic

Dimensions
- Wheelbase: 2,600 mm (102.4 in)
- Length: 4,565 mm (179.7 in)
- Width: 1,695 mm (66.7 in)
- Height: 1,395 mm (54.9 in)
- Curb weight: 1,140–1,330 kg (2,510–2,930 lb)

Nissan switched to boxy styling for the final U14 Bluebird for January 1996. The American Altima developed into a completely separate line of cars, with new L-series chassis codes. But in its home market of Japan – also the only market it was sold new in – the Bluebird was targeted more at buyers who favoured the formality of larger Japanese sedans. To fit in with a lower bracket in Japanese taxation legislation, the U14 retained a sub-1,700 mm (66.9 in) width.

Only a four-door sedan was offered. The hardtop and the option of a 1.6 L engine were removed. Engine choices were either the SR18DE, SR20DE, and the SR20VE, with available all-wheel-drive (ATTESA) versions. The Nissan Hyper CVT automatic transmission was available in this generation along with a standard four-speed automatic, five-speed manual. Some models had a 1973 cc diesel CD20E engine. Models offered include the standard LeGrand, luxury Eprise, sports-oriented SSS, and a limited run SSS-Z model. The SSS-Z model came with the variable valve lift-equipped, 190 PS (140 kW) SR20VE engine and featured special interior trim which was silver rather than the wood trim found on Legrand, Eprise, and SSS models.

In 2001, a final limited run of SSS models was produced. These cars have a special red and grey paint job, gold rather than the standard silver emblems, and red metal covers over the headlights.

Production of the Nissan Bluebird ended in Japan in August 2001, and it was replaced by the mid-size Nissan Maxima, Nissan Teana, and Nissan Altima internationally, and the compact Nissan Bluebird Sylphy in Japan. It has been a popular used export to Russia, Africa, some parts of the Caribbean, and New Zealand.

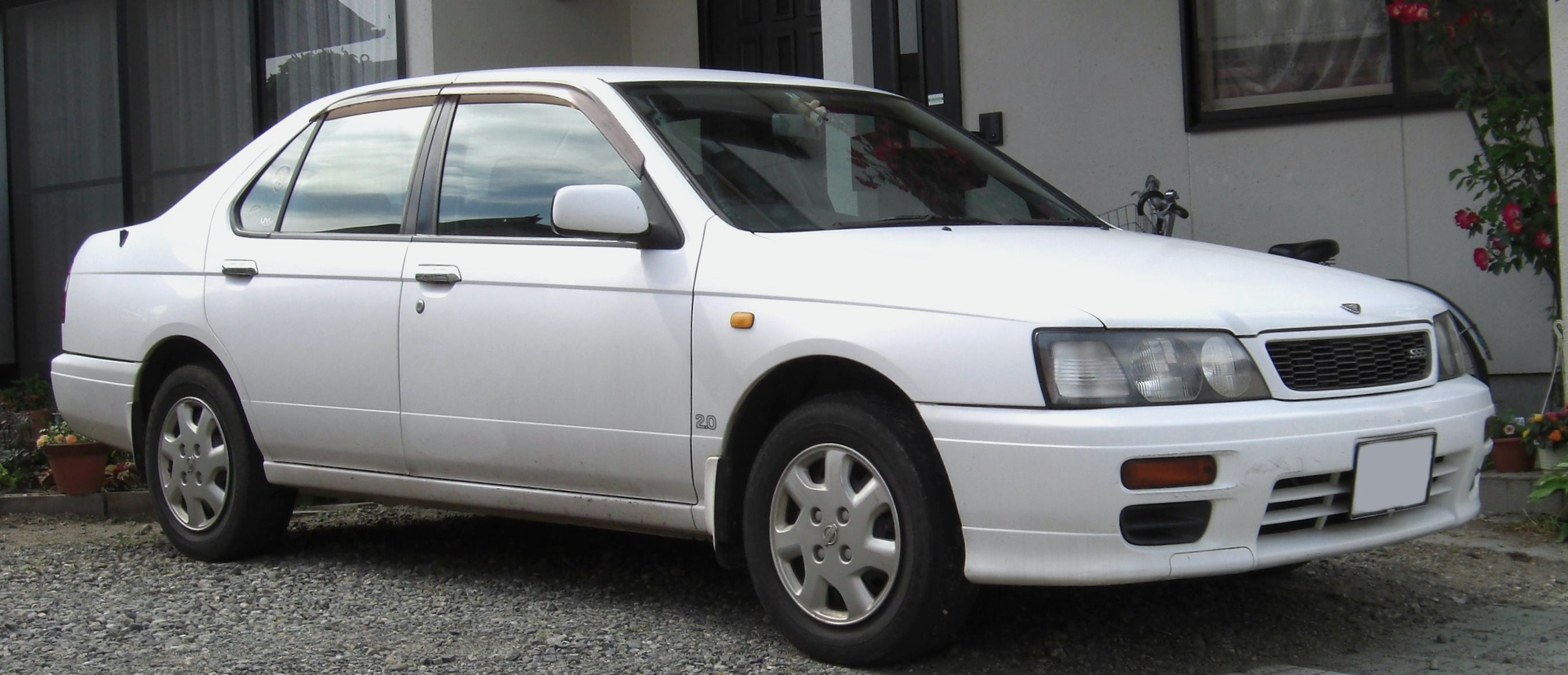
Nissan Bluebird SSS (pre-facelift)

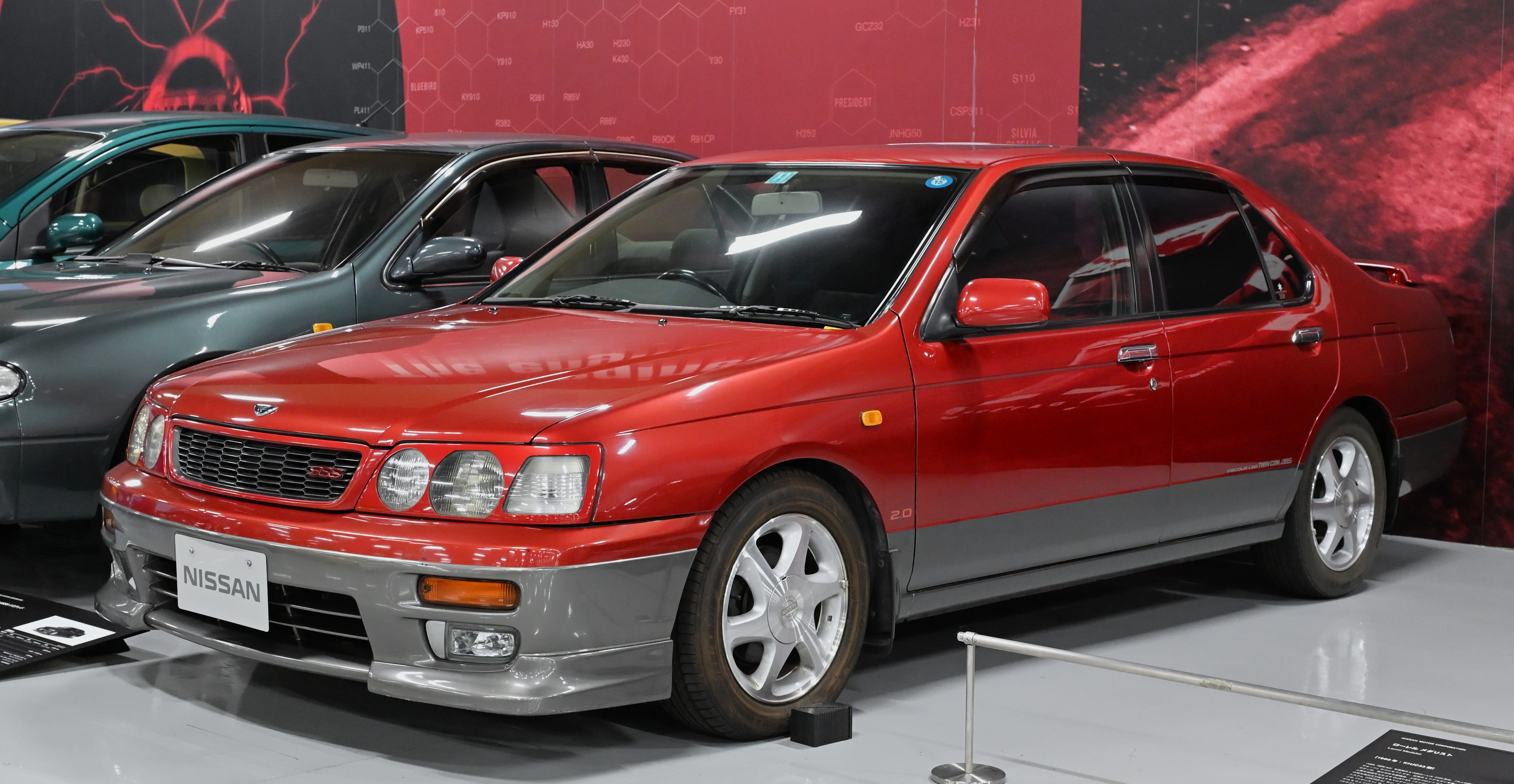
Nissan Bluebird SSS Limited

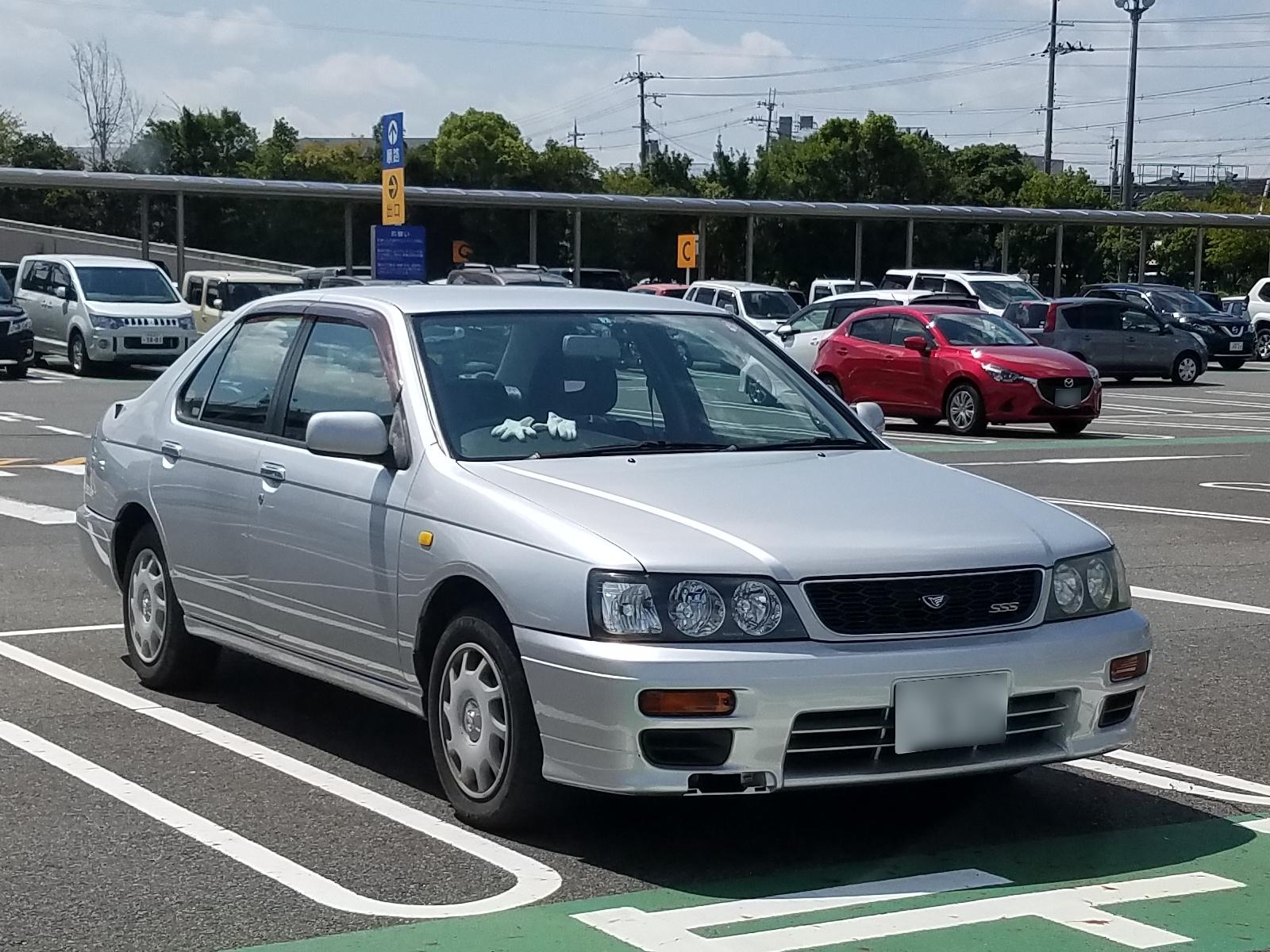
1998 Nissan Bluebird SSS (facelift)

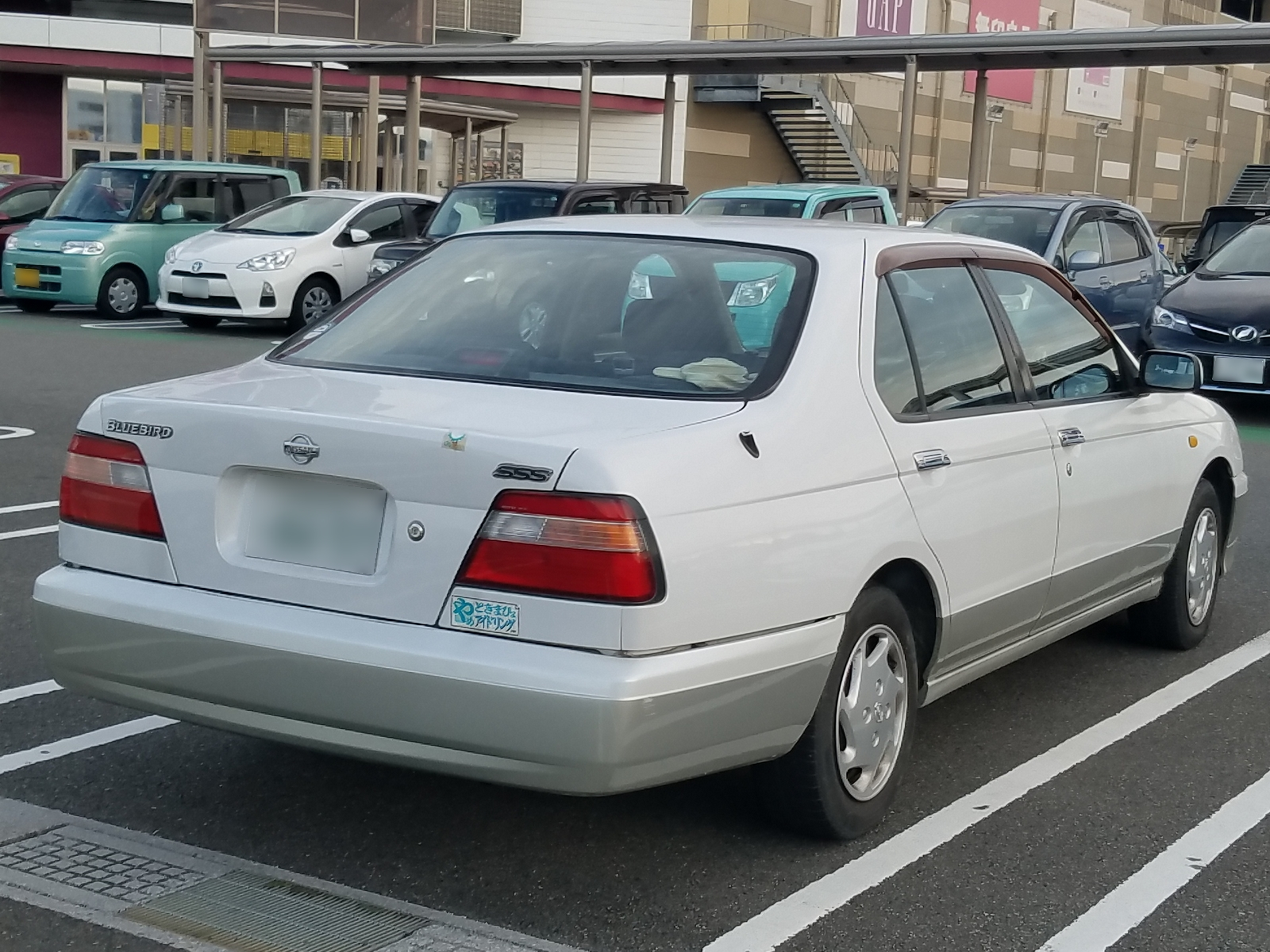
Rear view
