= Nissan Avenir =

The Nissan Avenir is a line of station wagons beginning production in May 1990 by Nissan of Japan, with the budget oriented delivery van starting out as the Avenir Cargo, then being renamed the Nissan Expert (ja) in 1999. The Avenir replaced the long-serving Nissan Bluebird wagon/delivery van and also the Skyline Van. It was a larger companion to the Nissan Wingroad/Nissan AD van. The 1999 Expert also assumed the load carrying duties of the discontinued Nissan Cedric and Gloria delivery vans. The Avenir appeared after the Subaru Legacy wagon, but before the competing Toyota Caldina wagon. The Avenir's appearance was not shared with another Nissan sedan, although it was sold as the estate version of the Primera in European markets.

The name Avenir is French for "future", and it was exclusive to Nissan Store Japanese dealerships, as it replaced the Bluebird wagon.

== W10 (First generation) ==
Nissan Avenir/Avenir Cargo W10
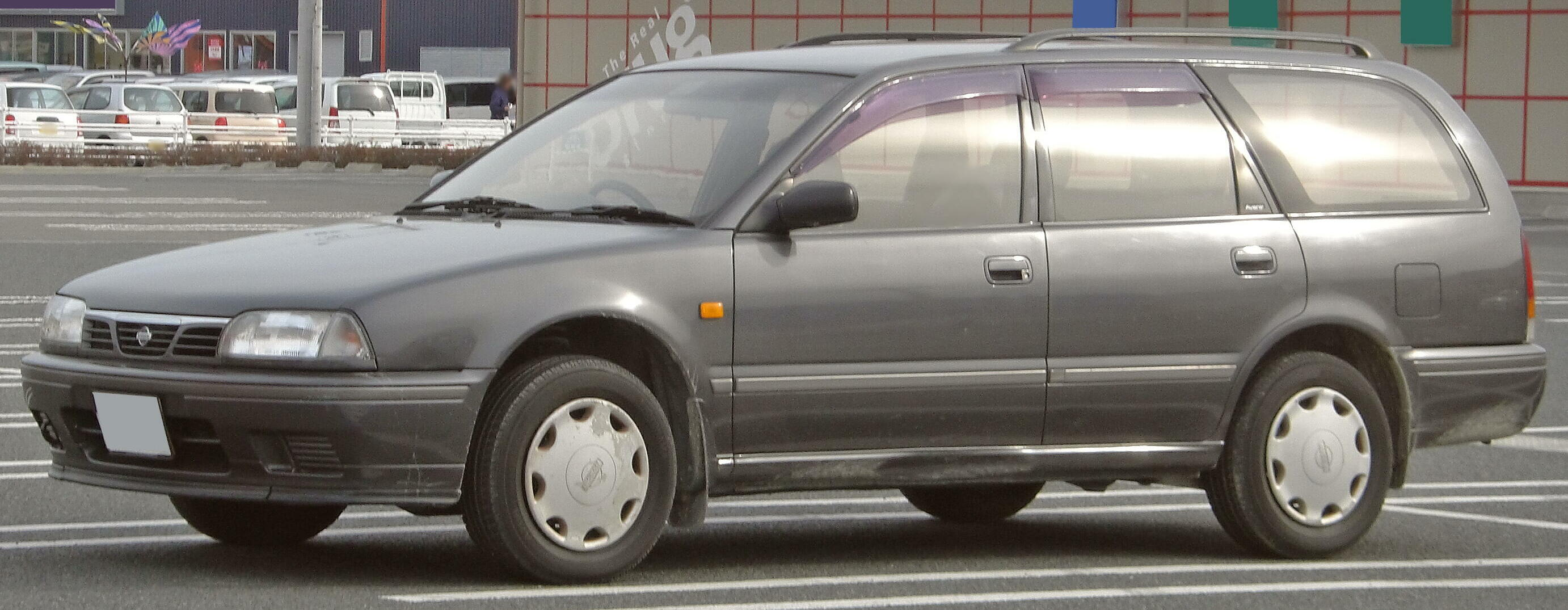
- 1990 Nissan Avenir

Overview
- Also called: Nissan Avenir Cargo; Nissan Primera Wagon
- Production: 1990–1998
- Assembly: Japan: Yokosuka, Kanagawa (Oppama Plant)

Body and chassis
- Layout: FF / F4
- Related: Nissan Prairie (M11)

Powertrain
- Engine: Petrol: 1.6 L GA16DS I4 (VEW10); 1.8 L SR18Di/SR18DE I4 (W10); 2.0 L SR20DE I4 (PW10); 2.0 L SR20DET turbo I4 (PW10); Diesel: 2.0 L CD20 I4 (VSW10); 2.0 L CD20T turbo I4 (SW10)

Dimensions
- Wheelbase: 2,550 mm (100.4 in)
- Length: 4,460 mm (175.6 in)
- Width: 1,695 mm (66.7 in)
- Height: 1,460–1,490 mm (57.5–58.7 in)

Chronology
- Predecessor: Nissan Bluebird (U12) Wagon

Introduced to the Japanese market in May 1990 (a small number of units were exported to Nissan New Zealand to replace the locally assembled U11 Bluebird wagon), the W10 Avenir was initially available with either the 1.8 L SR18Di in FWD or a 2.0 L SR20DE engine. The Nissan Expert/Avenir Cargo van light commercials came with either the 1.6 L GA16DS or the naturally aspirated CD20 2-liter diesel engine.

The FWD was available with either a four-speed automatic transmission or a five-speed manual. The 4WD models, introduced in October 1990, were only available coupled to the automatic in the Avenir and only with a manual transmission on the Avenir Cargo. There was also the ATTESA configuration. A 2.0 L CD20T turbo-diesel was added to the passenger version range along with a light facelift in January 1993. At the same time, the 1.8-liter SR18Di engine was changed to the improved 1.8 L SR18DE with electronic multi-point injection. In December 1993 a special edition called "Avenir Salut" appeared, French for "hello!", a name which eventually made its way onto the entire passenger car part of the Avenir range. The original Avenir Salut was a lower cost version of the Attesa-equipped, SR20DE-engined 2.0 Si, forgoing some of that car's standard equipment such as the front spoiler and alloy wheels.

High sales of the second generation Subaru Legacy Wagon prompted Nissan to redesign the Avenir's rear end in a similar style. This only applied to passenger car versions (the Avenir Cargo retained the original rear design), all of which were now badged Salut. These were introduced in August 1995, along with a turbocharged model called GT turbo; this came with a 210 PS (154 kW; 207 bhp) version of the 2.0-litre SR20DET and was available only in 4WD with the automatic transmission.

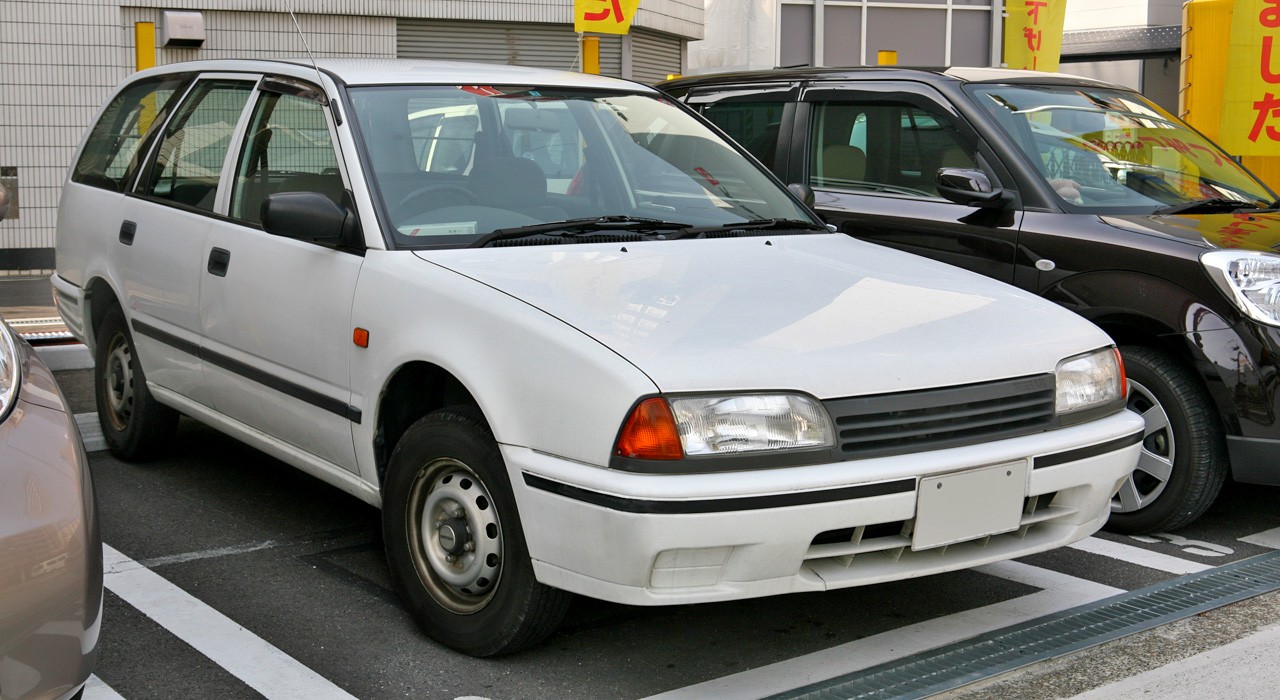
Nissan Avenir Cargo LX-G

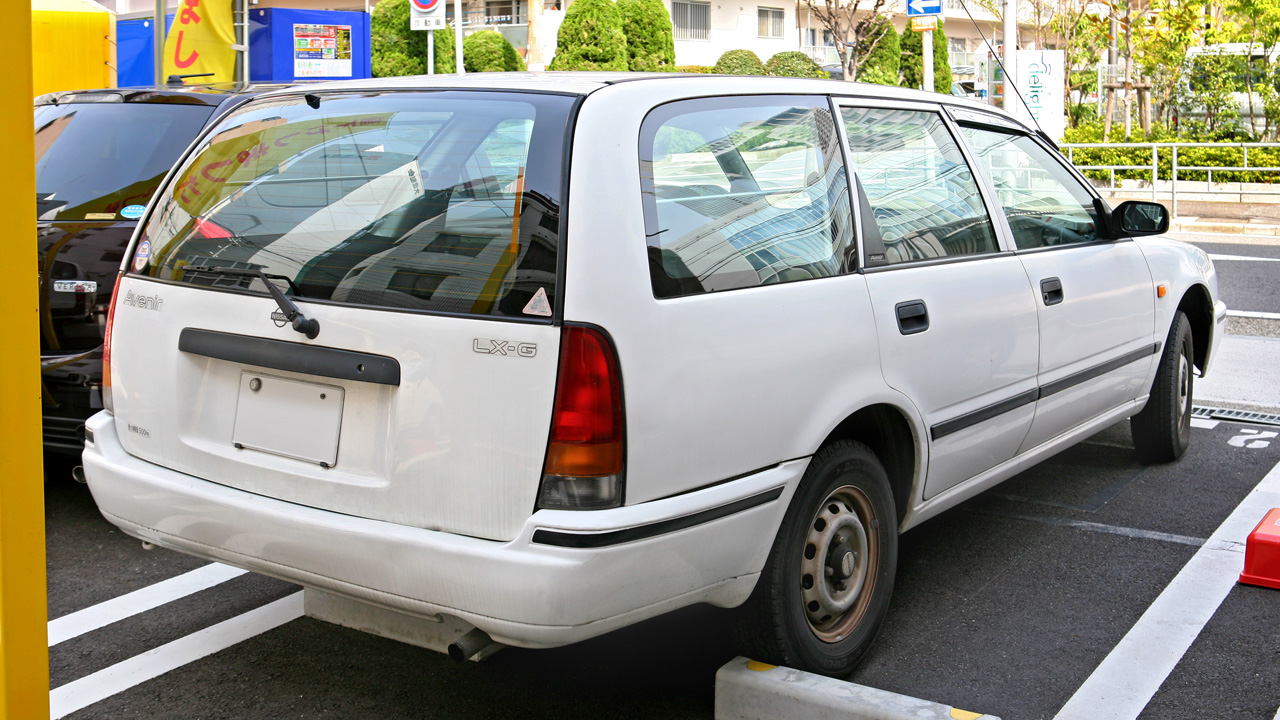
Nissan Avenir Cargo LX-G

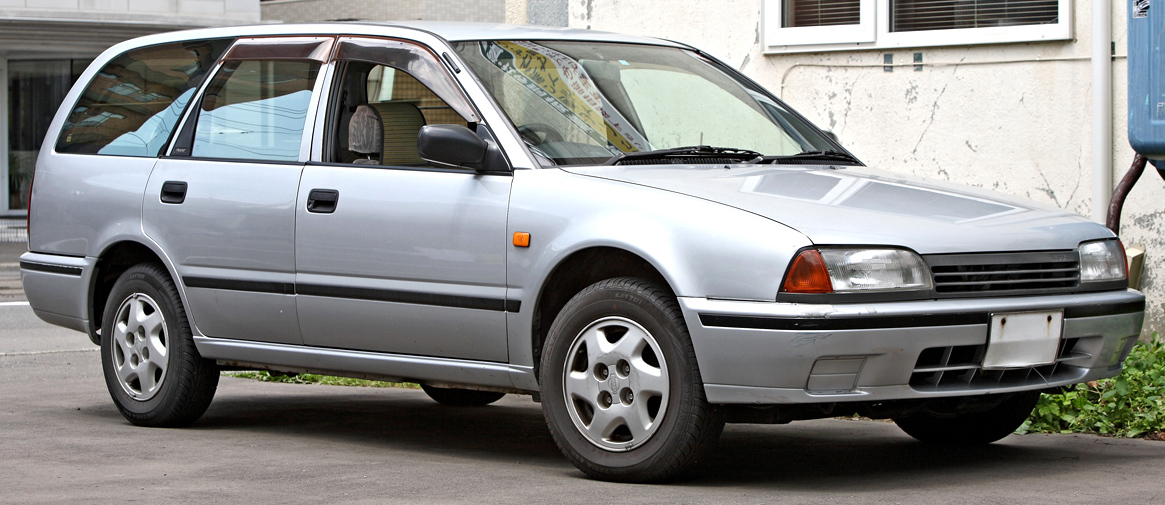
Nissan Avenir Cargo CX-G

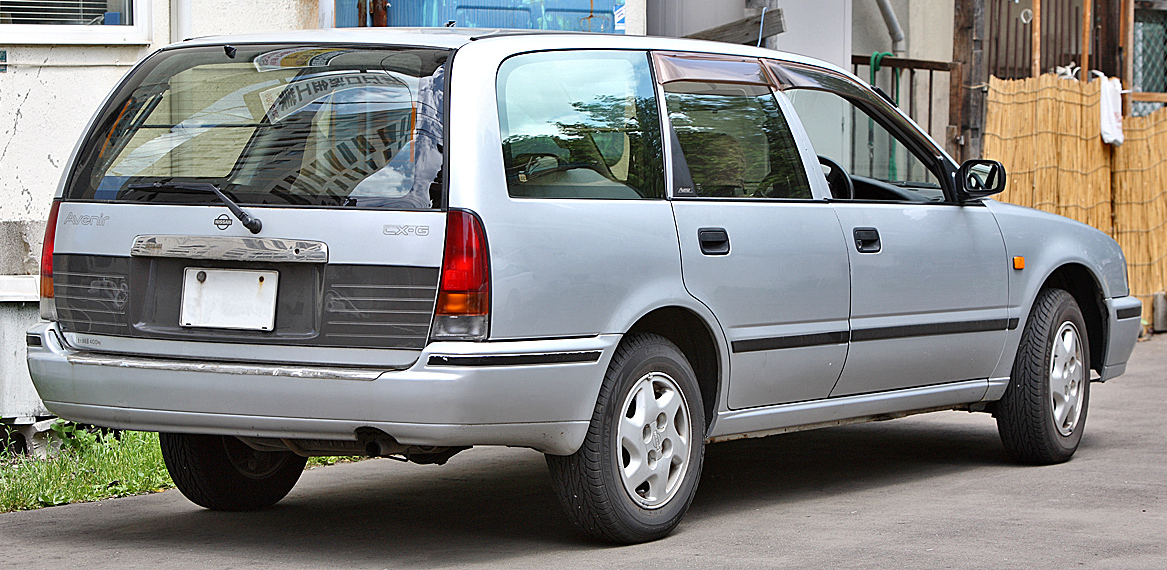
Nissan Avenir Cargo CX-G

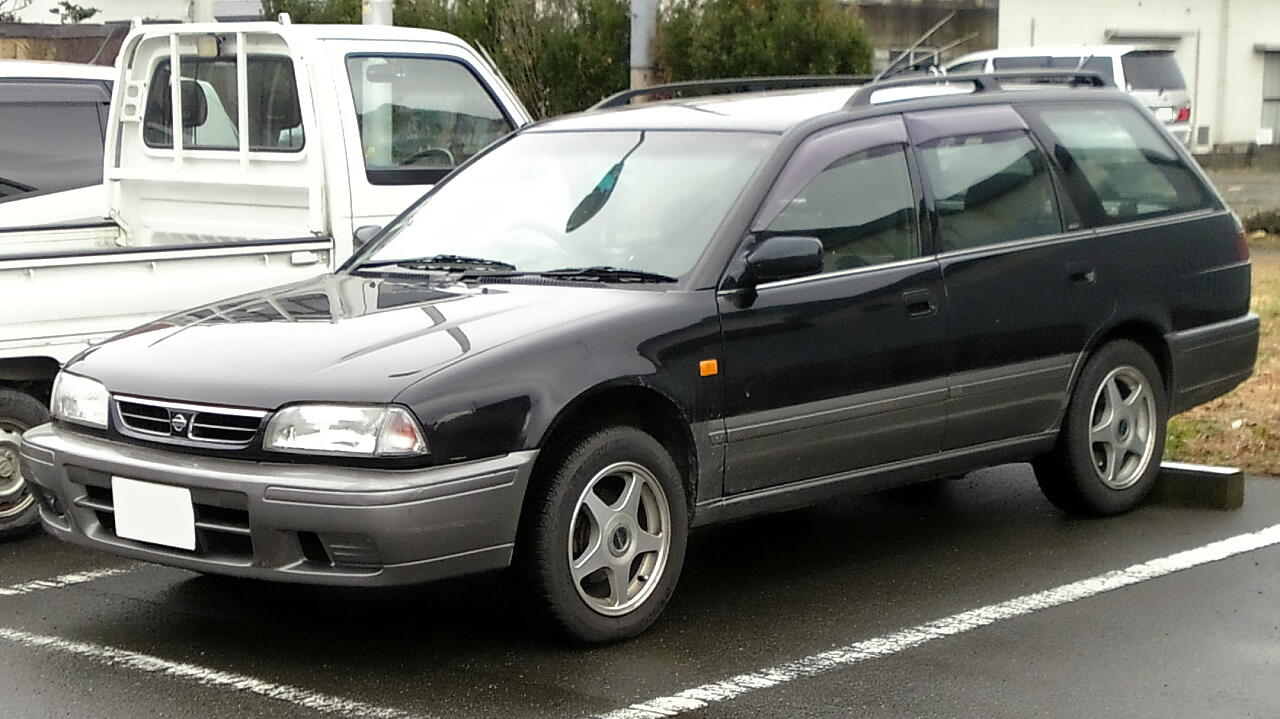
Nissan Avenir Blastar

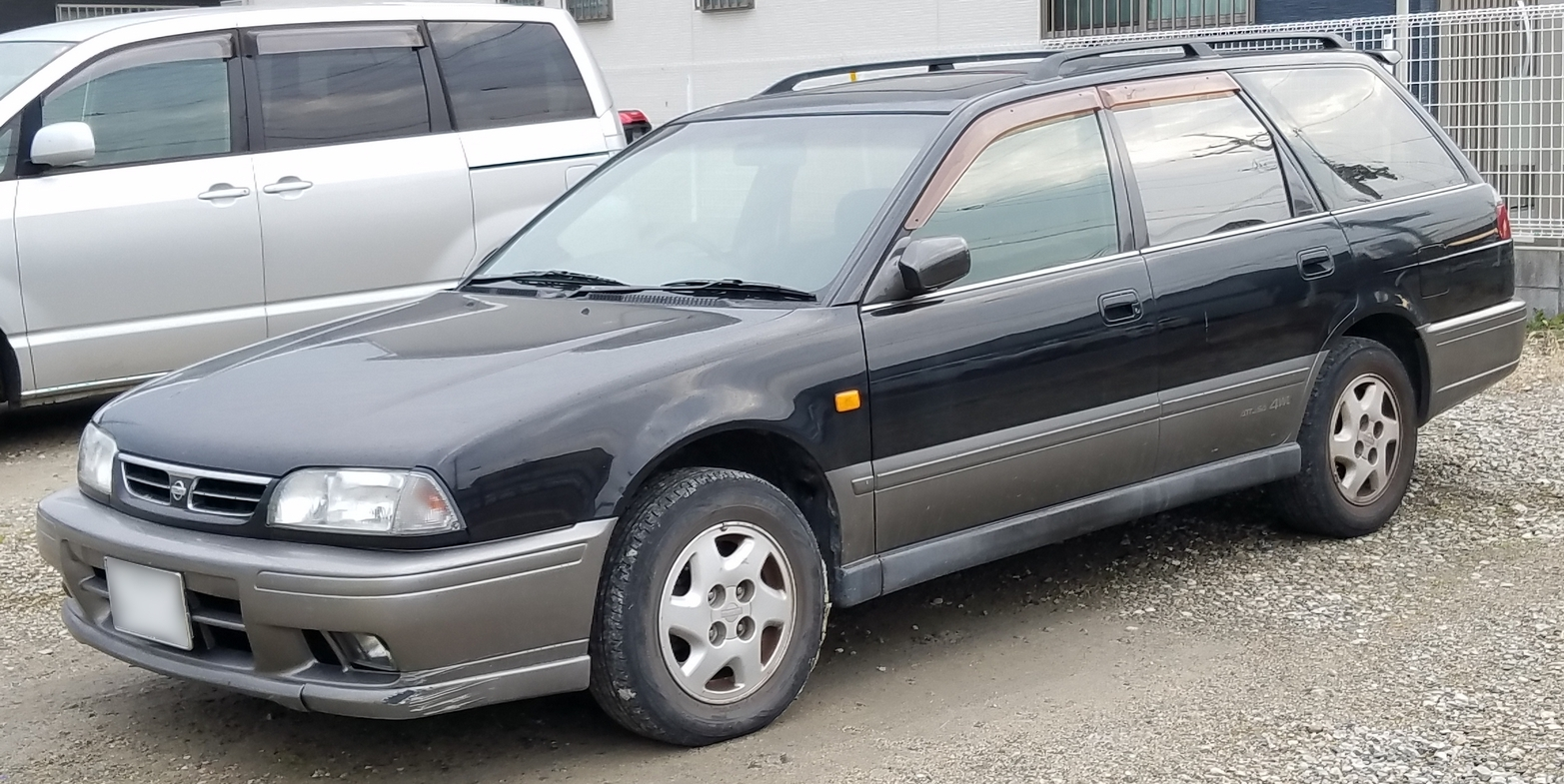
Nissan Avenir Salut

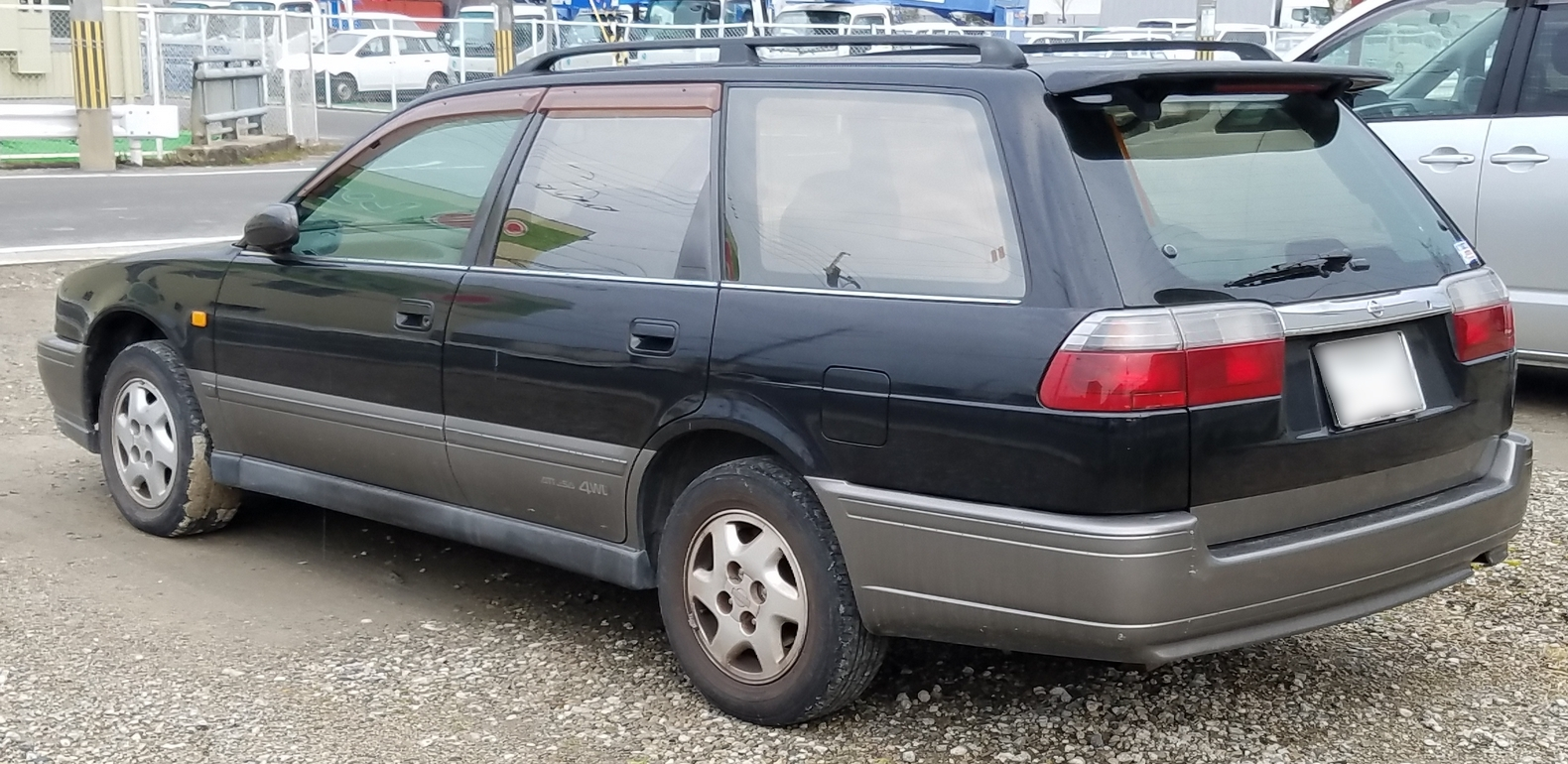
The Avenir Salut's redesigned rear end

== W11 (Second generation) ==
Nissan Avenir/Expert W11
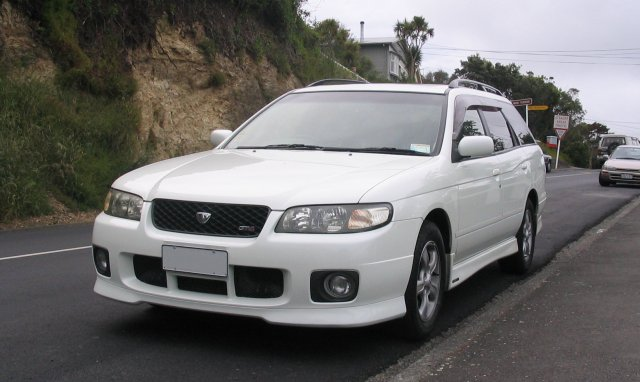
- 1999 Nissan Avenir GT4-Z

Overview
- Manufacturer: Nissan
- Also called: Nissan Avenir Cargo; Nissan Expert
- Production: 1998–2005 (Avenir); 1999–2006 (Expert)
- Assembly: Japan: Yokosuka, Kanagawa (Oppama Plant; Avenir); Hiratsuka (Nissan Shatai Shonan Plant; Expert, 2001–2006); Kyoto (Nissan Shatai Kyoto Plant; Expert, 1999–2001)

Body and chassis
- Layout: FF / F4

Powertrain
- Engine: Petrol: 1.8 L QG18DE I4 (W11/VW11); 2.0 L QR20DE I4 (RW11); 2.0 L SR20DE I4 (PW11); 2.0 L SR20DET turbo I4 (PW11); Diesel: 2.0 L CD20ET2 turbo I4 (SW11); 2.2 L YD22DD I4 (VEW11)

Dimensions
- Wheelbase: 2,620 mm (103.1 in)
- Length: 4,650 mm (183.1 in)
- Width: 1,695 mm (66.7 in)
- Height: 1,470–1,490 mm (57.9–58.7 in)

The W11 model was introduced early in 1998. Initially available with the 1.8 L QG18DE, 2.0 L SR20DE, 2.0 L SR20DET or the 2.0-litre CD20ET2 turbo-diesel. The QG18DE models were FWD only and available with either a 4-speed automatic or 5-speed manual transmission, the SR20DE models were an FWD 4-speed automatic or CVT transmission with 6-speed tiptronic function, the 4WD continued to be conventional 4-speed automatic only. The diesel CD20ET was only available with a 4-speed automatic. Once more the turbocharged 2.0 L SR20DET variants were available only in 4WD coupled with the conventional 4-speed automatic. The power output of the turbo version increased to 230 PS (169 kW; 227 bhp). This generation of the Avenir was not sold outside of Japan.

From May 2000 the turbocharged Salut was renamed the GT4 along with interior and exterior changes. The output of the SR20DE engine was improved. From the August 2000 facelift, the CVT transmission was fitted to some non-turbo 4WD models.

Autech offered a customized version called the "Rider" trim level.

October 2000 saw the introduction of the Avenir Blastar, with an increased ground clearance and larger wheels, equipped with ATTESA and the SR20DE engine as an alternative to the Subaru Outback. Nissan shared the appearance with the smaller Nissan Wingroad JS.

In August 2002, the SR20DE and the SR20DET engines were replaced with the new QR20DE.

Due to lack of demand for the Avenir, the entire line was cancelled in September 2005; the Expert delivery van lasted until December 2006.

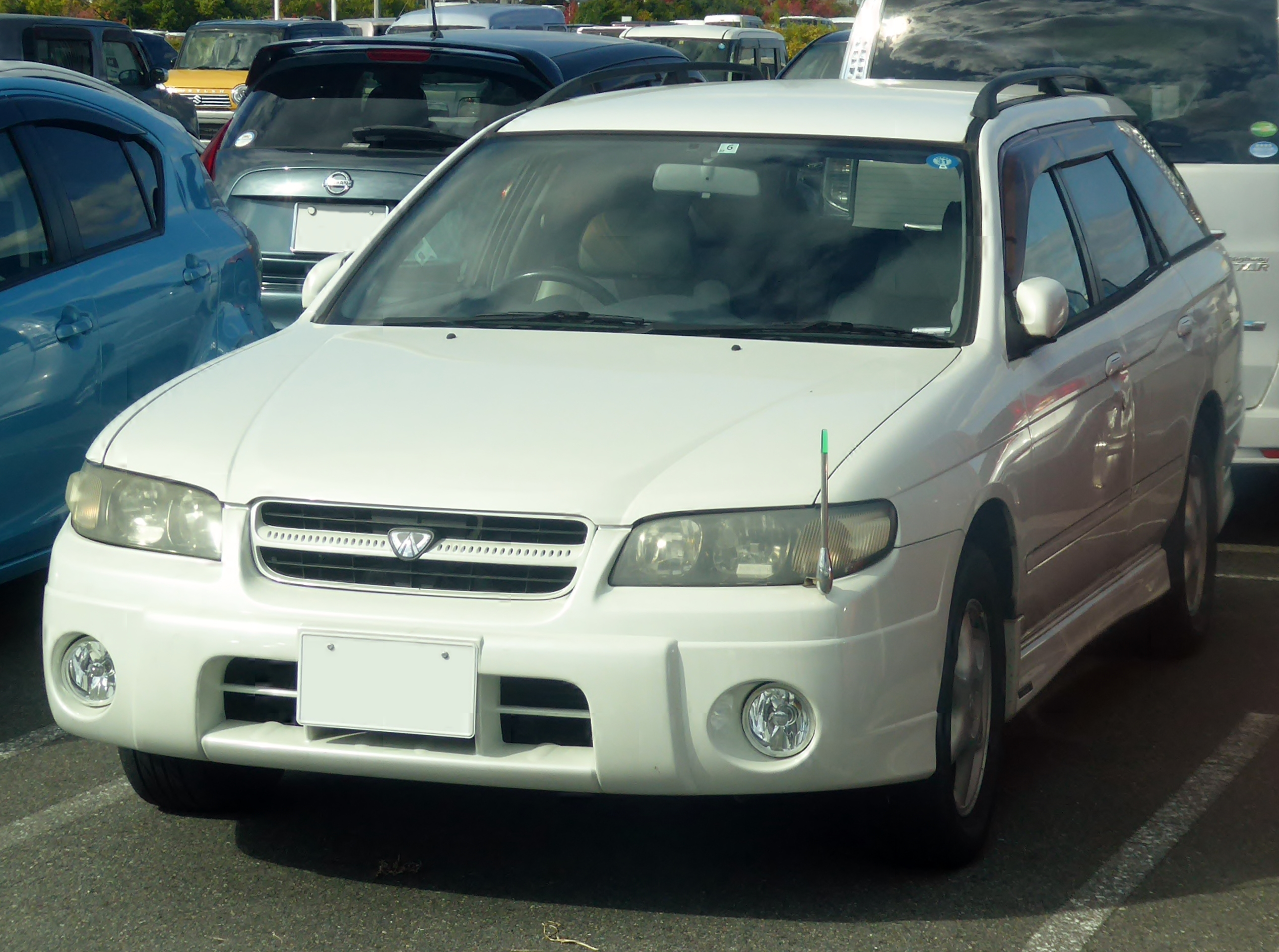
2001 Nissan Avenir Blastar

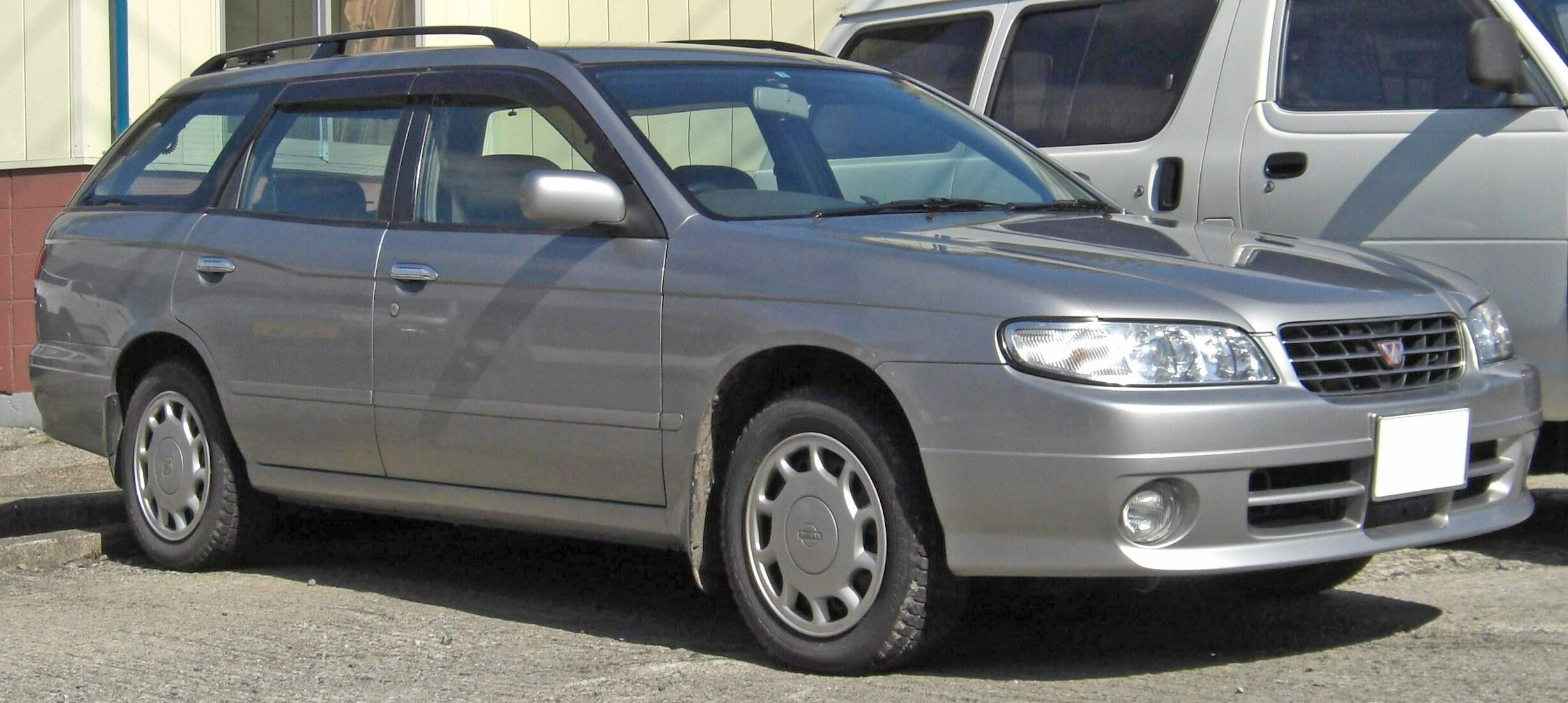
Nissan Avenir

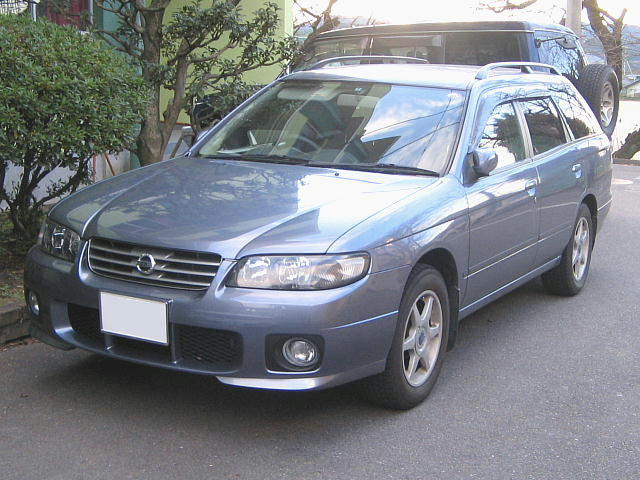
Avenir facelift front

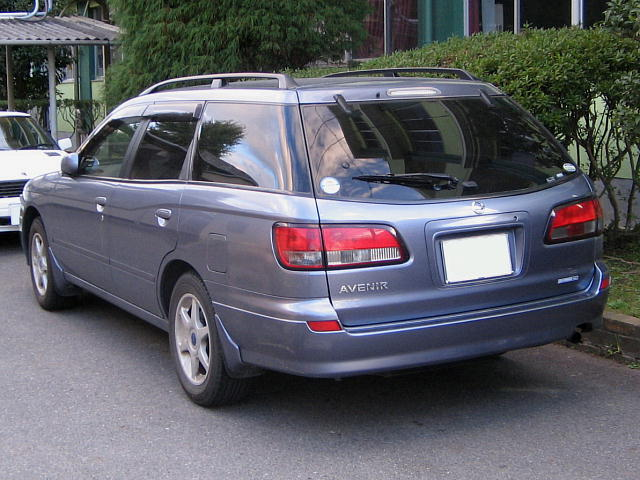
Avenir facelift rear

=== Nissan Expert ===
After a brief hiatus, the Avenir Cargo delivery van was renamed the Nissan Expert starting in June 1999. The Expert came in three trim levels (L-G, LX-G, VX-G), two- or four-wheel drive, and with two engines: the 1.8-liter QG18DE (NEO), producing 125 PS (92 kW), or the 2.2-liter YD22DD diesel engine with 79 PS (58 kW). The front-wheel drive diesel could be had with a five-speed manual; all other versions of the Expert received Nissan's electronically controlled four-speed automatic transmission (E-ATx).

In December 2004, the diesel-engined Expert models were discontinued, leaving only the 1.8-liter petrol engine. This type continued to be built until December 2006 in the same three trim levels as originally introduced. The Expert was replaced by the Nissan AD Expert, a more comfort-oriented derivative of the AD Van.

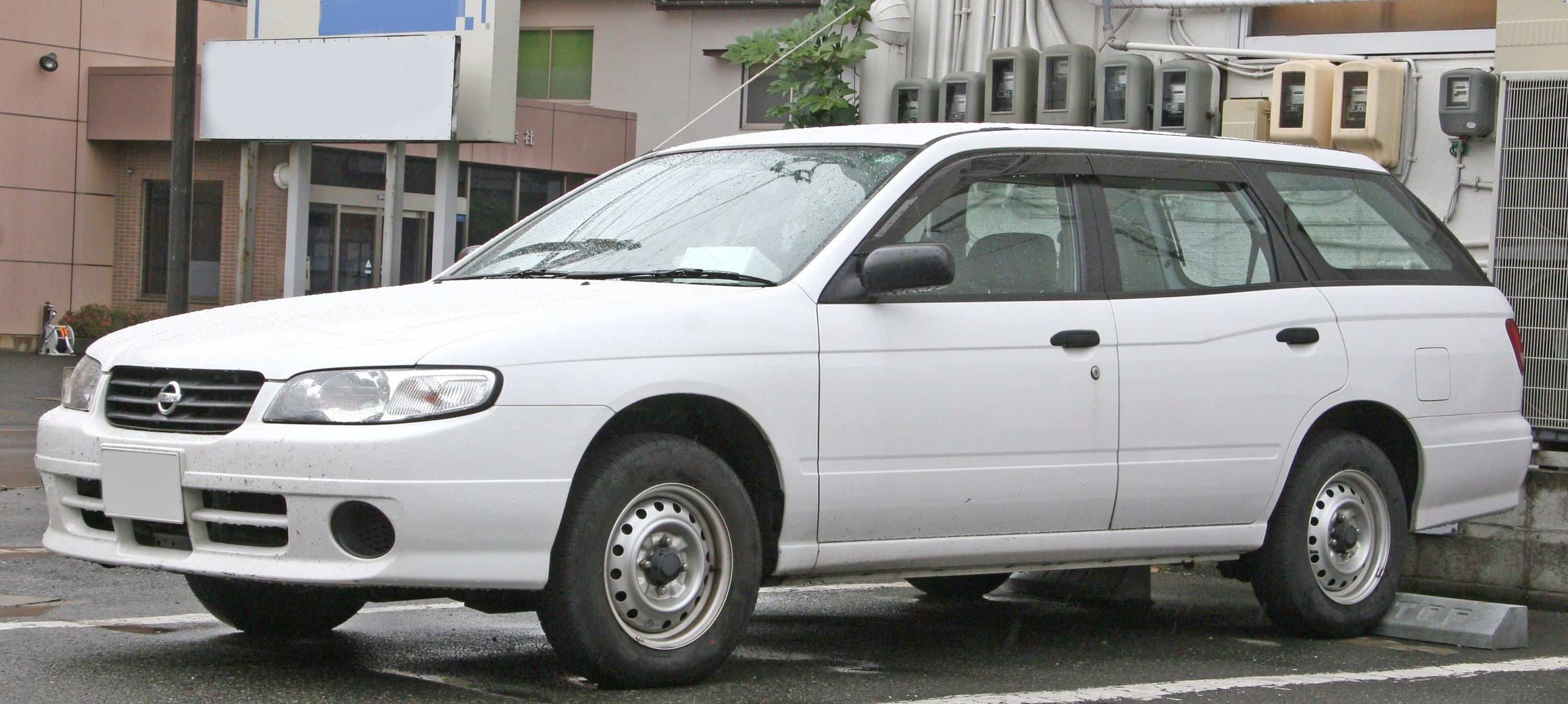
2002 Nissan Expert

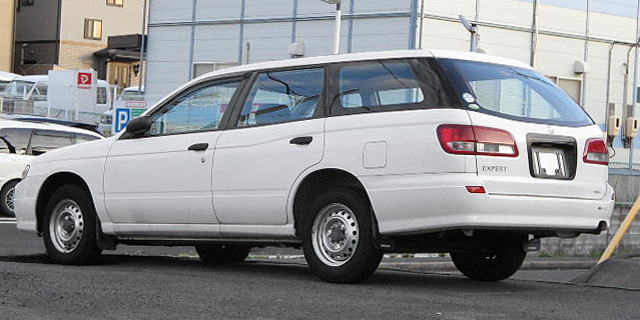
2002 Nissan Expert
