= Nissan Primera =

Large family car

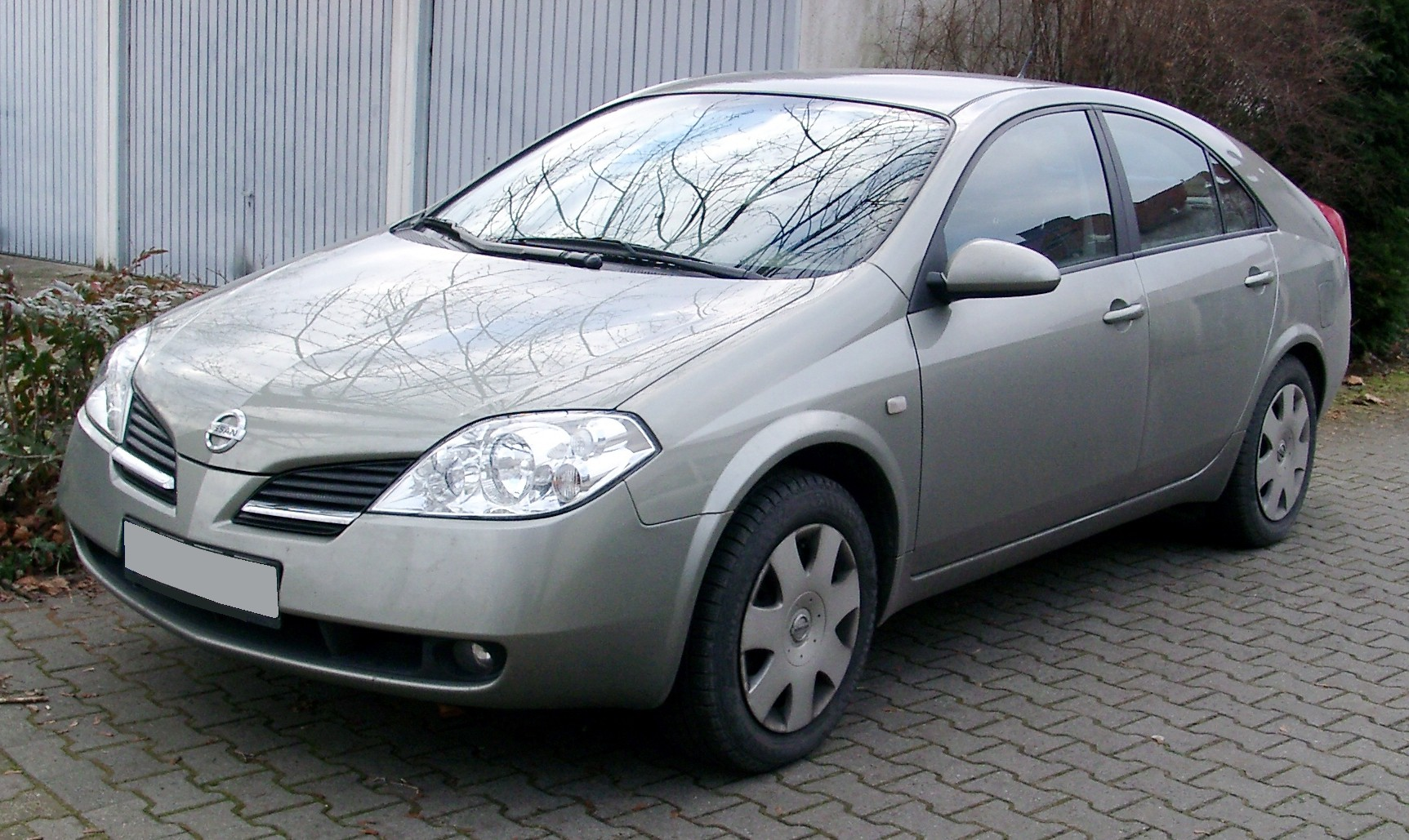
- Third-generation Nissan Primera (P12)

Overview
- Manufacturer: Nissan
- Also called: Infiniti G20 (1990–2002)
- Production: 1990–2008

Body and chassis
- Class: Mid-size/large family car
- Layout: Front-engine, front-wheel-drive

Chronology
- Predecessor: Nissan Bluebird; Nissan Auster

The Nissan Primera (Japanese: 日産・プリメーラ, Hepburn: Nissan Purimēra) is a large family car produced by the Japanese carmaker Nissan. It was first produced from 1990 to 2008, for the markets in Japan and Europe. In Japan, it replaced the Auster/Stanza, and was exclusive to Nissan Prince Store locations. In North America, it was the entry level luxury sports sedan for the Infiniti brand, named the G20. The nameplate was revived in 2026 as a battery electric model based on the N7.

The word "primera" in Spanish means "first", in its feminine form.

== First generation (P10; 1990) ==
First generation
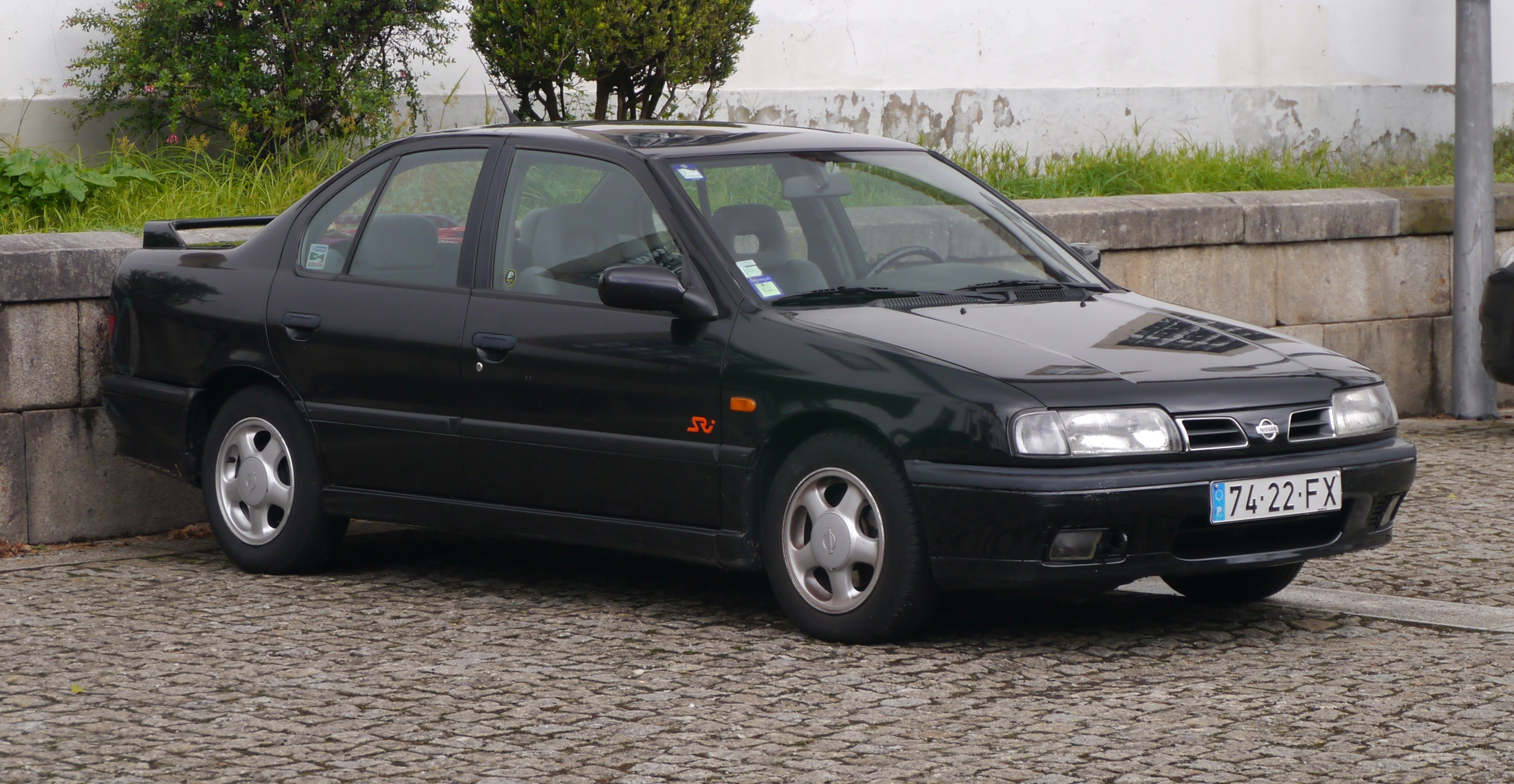
- Nissan Primera Sedan 2.0 SRi (P10) in Portugal

Overview
- Model code: P10
- Also called: Nissan Avenir; Infiniti G20; Yulon Nissan Primera 931 (TW)
- Production: 1990–1996
- Assembly: Japan: Yokosuka (Oppama Plant); United Kingdom: Sunderland (NMUK); Taiwan: Miaoli
- Designer: Yoshio Maezawa; Mamoru Aoki

Body and chassis
- Body style: 4-door saloon 5-door hatchback 5-door estate

Powertrain
- Engine: Petrol: 1.6 L GA16DS/GA16DE I4; 1.8 L SR18Di/SR18DE I4; 2.0 L SR20DE I4; Diesel: 2.0 L CD20 I4
- Transmission: 5-speed manual 4-speed automatic

Dimensions
- Wheelbase: 2,704 mm (106.5 in)
- Length: 4,481 mm (176.4 in) (saloon, hatchback); 4,631 mm (182.3 in) (estate)
- Width: 1,747 mm (68.8 in) (saloon, hatchback); 1,745 mm (68.7 in) (estate); 1,695 mm (66.7 in) (Japan, Infiniti G20)
- Height: 1,372 mm (54.0 in) (saloon, hatchback); 1,391 mm (54.8 in) (estate)

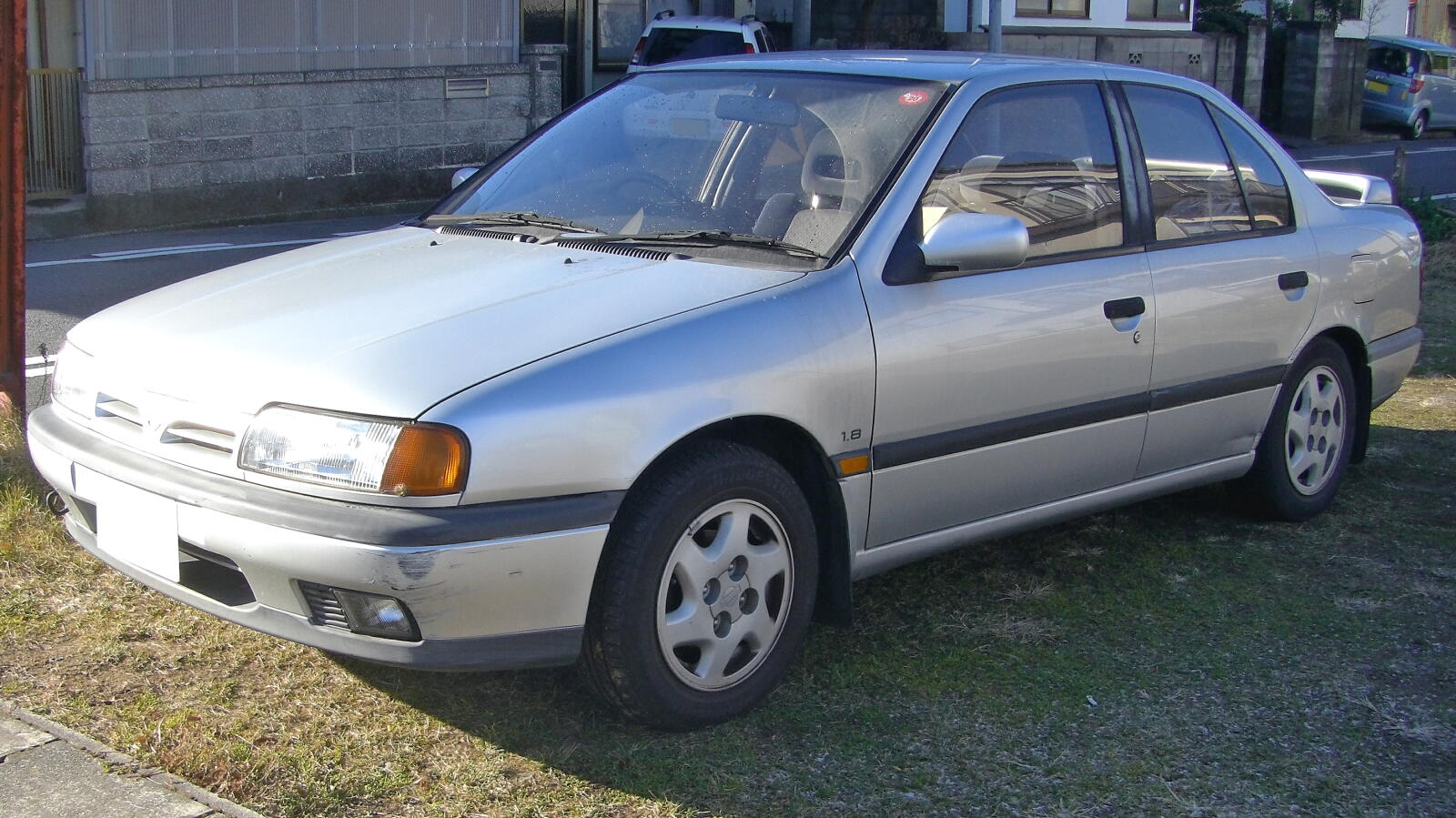
1990 Nissan Primera 1.8 (Japan)

Since 1986, Nissan had been building Bluebirds — essentially a rebadged home market Auster/Stanza – for the market in Europe at its factory in Washington, Tyne and Wear, England. Nissan showcased the Primera X concept car at the 1989 Tokyo Motor Show as part of Project 901 (Nissan's performance vision for 1990), and concept car UV.X at the 1989 Frankfurt Motor Show. The design was specifically targeted at European buyers.

Having originally launched in Japan in February 1990, Nissan replaced the United Kingdom's Bluebird with the slightly smaller Primera in September that year. It had a conventional, front-wheel drive chassis and five-speed manual gearbox, with some versions getting the option of a four-speed automatic.

Power came from 1.6-litre carbureted (not available in Japan, except in the Avenir Cargo van version) and 1.8-litre and 2.0-litre injection petrol engines. In Europe, a 2.0-litre diesel followed from 1992 onwards, while a 1.6-litre injection gasoline was introduced at the end of 1993. The 1.8 was originally a single point injection model (SR18Di); a multi point injection with more power was added in 1991. For the domestic Japanese market there was also a very rare version built and tuned by Japanese tuning company Autech: these models came with special Autech suspension and interior packages and a tuned SR20DE 2.0-litre engine making 180 PS (132 kW).

The 1.8-litre version was not built with left-hand drive and was not sold in continental Europe. Bodystyles were four- and five-door saloons. A five-door estate was also offered as the Primera Traveller; however, it was based on the slightly different sheet metal of the Nissan Avenir and was only made in Japan. With the exception of the UK GT, only the four-door model was available in Japan.

The Primera saw Nissan's multi link front suspension applied to front-wheel drive for the first time. The 2.0-litre gasoline engine received a power upgrade in 1992, which gave the then ZXe (later renamed the eGT) 150 PS (110 kW) from the standard 2.0-litre engine and a claimed top speed of 219 km/h (136 mph).

Some five-door, British made, RHD Primeras were exported back to Japan where they were sold under the name of Primera UK GT. This was the first British-built Japanese car to be reverse-exported back to Japan. In the United States, cars built in Japan was rebadged as the Infiniti G20, part of Nissan's upper scale Infiniti brand. The G20 was based on the Japanese model Primera, which featured a narrower body to remain within the Japanese compact class tax bracket with width limit at 1.7 m (66.9 in); the Japanese-spec UK GTs also feature the narrower body to comply with the tax bracket.

=== Trim levels (Europe) ===
The Primera range came in six trim levels at launch: L, LS, SLX, GS, GSX and ZX. The 1.6-litre engine was available in L, LS and LSX trim and the 2.0-litre 115 PS (85 kW) engine was available in LS, GS and GSX trim. The ZX model had a 2.0-litre 150 PS (110 kW; 148 hp) engine. From 1992 onwards, the range was facelifted and new L, LX, SLX, SGX and eGT trim levels replaced the original naming scheme. A 2.0-litre diesel version was available from 1992.

The L cars were basic, and had 1.6-litre petrol engines only. The LX was slightly plusher, but 2.0-litre petrol and diesel versions were also available. SLX was the mid range model, and these also had a choice of 1.6 and 2.0 petrol, or 2.0 diesel engines. The SGX trim level was the luxury specification version; it is powered by the 2.0-litre 115 PS (85 kW; 113 hp) engine.

The eGT was the sporting version, with a 2.0-litre 150 PS (110 kW; 148 hp) engine. Engine power was slightly increased during 1994, with the 1.6 model producing 102 PS (75 kW; 101 hp) and the 2.0 model up to 125 PS (92 kW; 123 hp).

From 1994, the range received another facelift, and the trim levels were almost the same; although Equation replaced the basic L as the entry level trim; like its predecessor, it had a 1.6 petrol engine, but there was no diesel option. A rare (around 1,000 examples in Europe) 4x4 option was available, known as a T4 in Japan this was fitted with the 150 PS (110 kW; 148 hp) DOHC engine. At this time, the SE replaced the SGX.

A new "warm hatch" version, the SRi, joined the line up from 1994. This had a choice of 1.6- or 2.0-litre petrol engines.

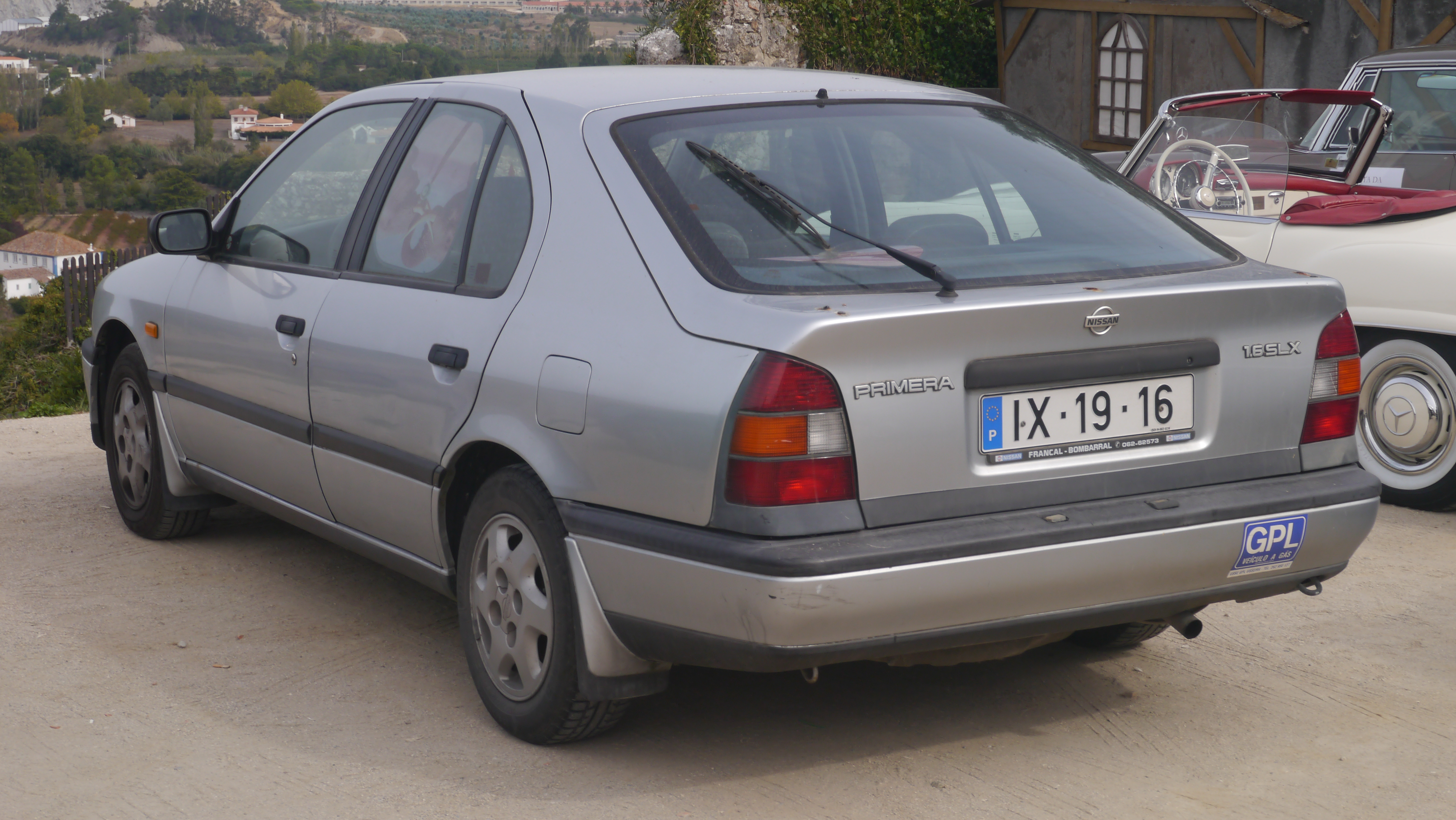
Liftback

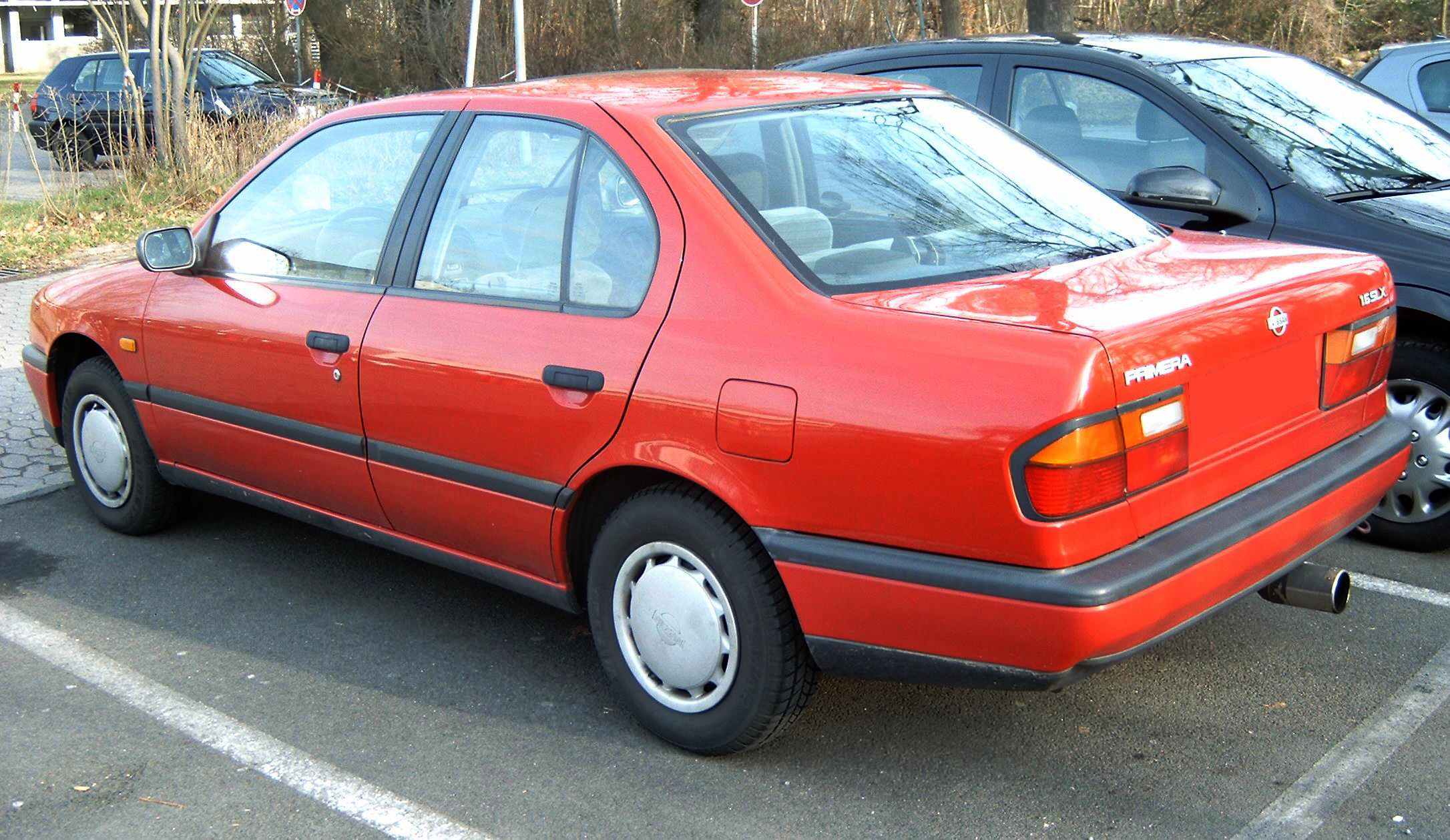
Saloon

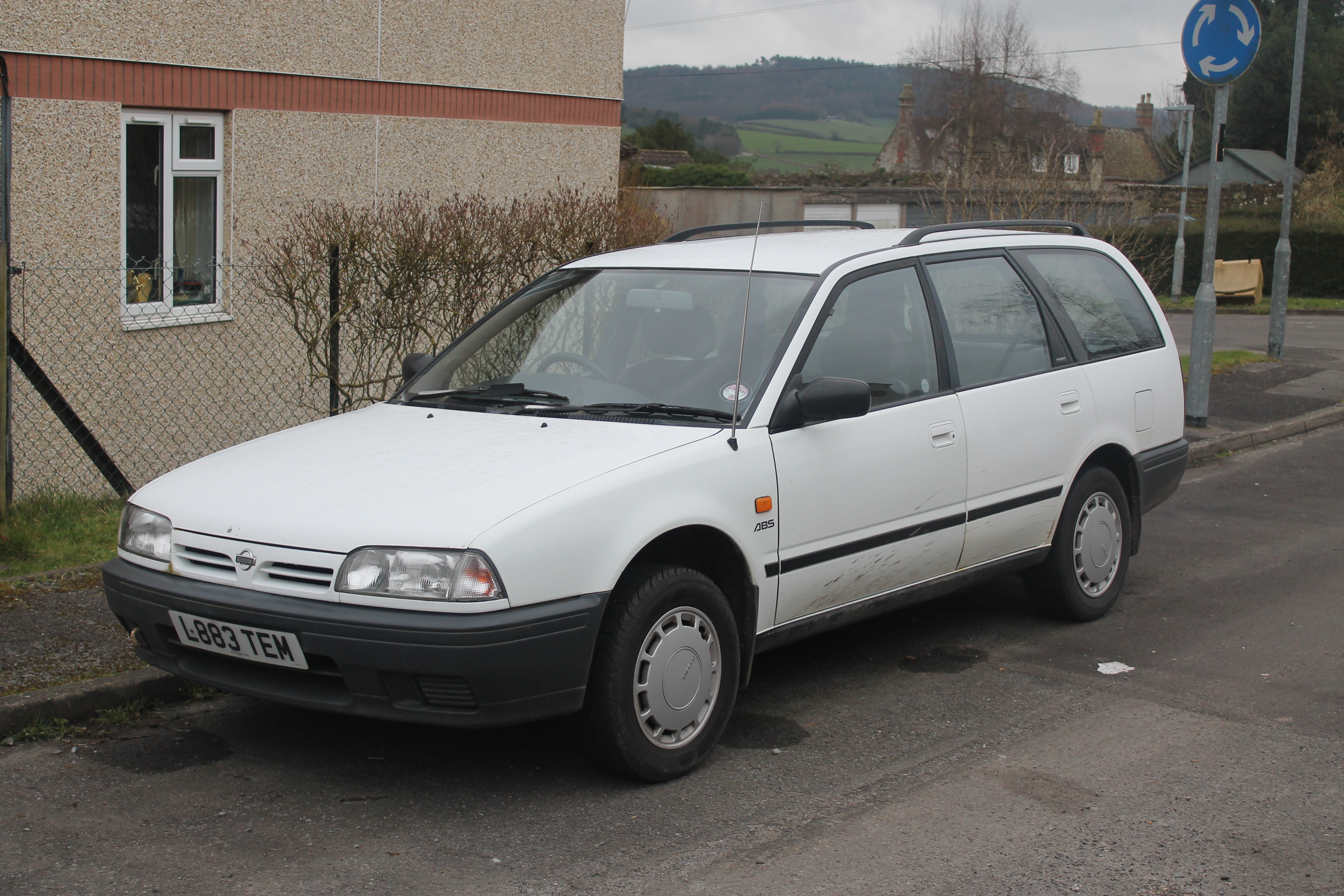
Traveller

== Second generation (P11; 1996) ==
Second generation
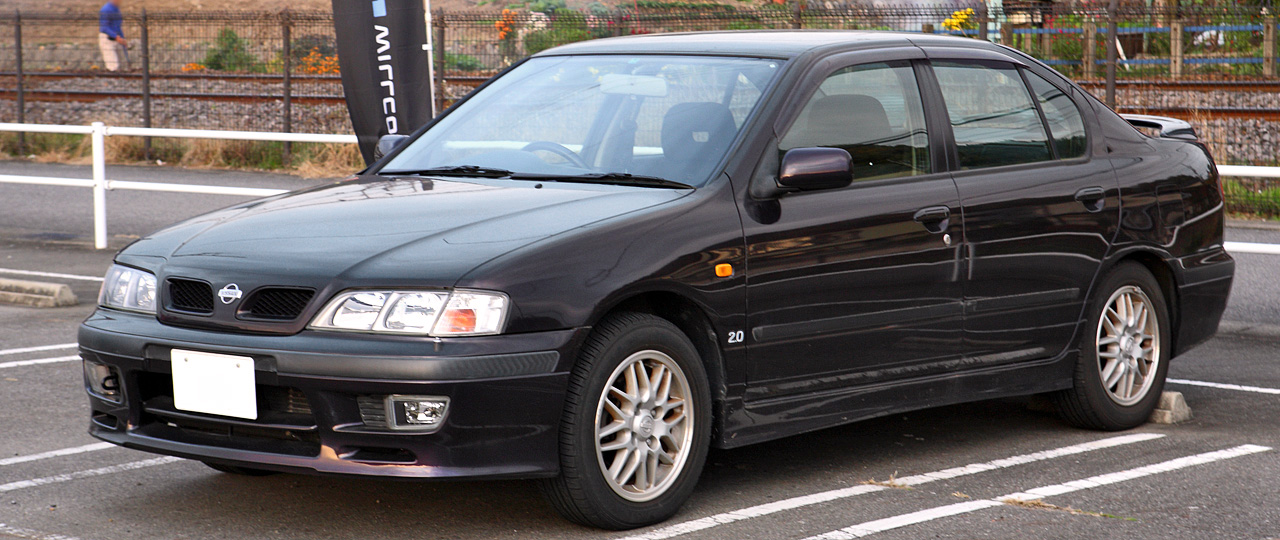
- Nissan Primera Sedan 2.0 Te-V CVT M6 (P11) in Japan

Overview
- Model code: P11
- Also called: Infiniti G20
- Production: 1996–2002
- Assembly: Japan: Yokosuka (Oppama Plant); United Kingdom: Sunderland (NMUK); South Africa: Rosslyn, Gauteng (NSA); New Zealand: Wiri, Auckland
- Designer: Shinji Sasaki (1992)

Body and chassis
- Body style: 4-door saloon 5-door hatchback 5-door estate

Powertrain
- Engine: Petrol: 1.6 L GA16DE I4; 1.6 L QG16DE I4; 1.8 L QG18DE I4; 1.8 L SR18DE I4; 2.0 L SR20DE I4; 2.0 L SR20VE Neo VVL I4; Diesel: 2.0 L CD20T I4
- Transmission: 4-speed automatic; 5-speed manual - RS5F32A / RS5F32V; CVT

Dimensions
- Wheelbase: 2,600 mm (102.4 in)
- Length: 4,430 mm (174.4 in) (saloon, hatchback); 4,515 mm (177.8 in) (estate); 4,522 mm (178.0 in) (facelift : saloon, hatchback); 4,566 mm (179.8 in) (facelift : estate)
- Width: 1,715 mm (67.5 in); 1,695 mm (66.7 in) (Japan, Infiniti G20)
- Height: 1,400 mm (55.1 in) (saloon); 1,415 mm (55.7 in) (hatchback); 1,450 mm (57.1 in) (estate)

The second-generation Primera was launched in Japan at the end of 1995 and in Europe in the autumn of 1996. Unique in its class, the new Primera featured multi-link front and multi-link beam rear suspension.

As before, in Europe the Primera was sold with 1.6 L and 2.0 L petrol engines and a 2.0 L diesel, with hatchback, saloon and estate bodystyles. While the estate was now based on the Primera's platform, it was assigned a model code of WP11.

In Japan, the Primera was initially offered with the SR18DE, SR20DE and SR20VE engines, and initially only as a sedan; these models (including the British-built UK GT models for sale in Japan) were slightly narrower at 1,695 mm (66.7 in) to remain within the Japanese compact class tax bracket.

The hatchback assembled in the United Kingdom was available only with the SR20DE engine and automatic transmission and began production from November 1997, a captive import known as the Primera UK GT. Estate began production from September 1997.

Alongside the original Primera, the Nissan Primera Camino was launched as a badge engineered model for different dealer networks.

The models for Japan also introduced a CVT automatic transmission during the P11 series, including a six-speed tiptronic version in the M6 G-V and Autech edition wagons and Te-V saloon. The Te-V was equipped with SR20VE and CVT M6 transmissions only.

Nissan continued selling the Primera in the United States as the Infiniti G20 from 1998 until 2002, when it was replaced by a rebadged version of the Nissan Skyline V35 as the Infiniti G35. The G20 used the same grille and rear lamp alterations from the Primera Camino.

In 1998, Nissan New Zealand released a limited edition Primera SMX with association with Steve Millen (Stillen Sports Parts). Features include cross drilled brakes, Eibach springs and a more aggressive body kit. The engine received minor modifications including a free-flow exhaust and a K&N air filter, bumping power up to 118 kW (160 PS; 158 hp). There were a total of 26 (including the prototype numbered 000) made in five colour choices (the prototype was the only white one made).

This was because until 1998 (due to lifting of import tariffs on cars) Nissan had an automotive assembly operation in New Zealand, and for a short time between 1997 and 1998 the P11 Primera was assembled in Wiri, Auckland. The locally assembled models were all fitted with the 110 kW (150 PS; 148 hp) SR20DE engine and were available in four different trim levels: S, SE, SES, and SEL. The Japanese-made Primeras which replaced it received the one-piece chrome grille (from the Primera Camino) and US-style taillights; the new trim levels were GX and GXE.

In South Africa, the Primera commenced local assembly from complete knock-down kits in September 1998.

To celebrate the two victories in 1998, Nissan UK released a limited edition of 400 GTSE models, with 16" AZEV alloy wheels, two tone "flip" ChromaFlair "Mystic" green paint, following the special theme to the interior which featured full leather seating with green piping seats, steering wheel and a Momo gearknob.

To celebrate the 1999 "clean sweep", they released a limited edition GTLE model with 16" multi spoke Enkei alloy wheels, a full leather interior with silver piping, a Momo gearknob and a colour choice of Flame Red, Kuro Black, Starburst Silver, and Nordic Blue.

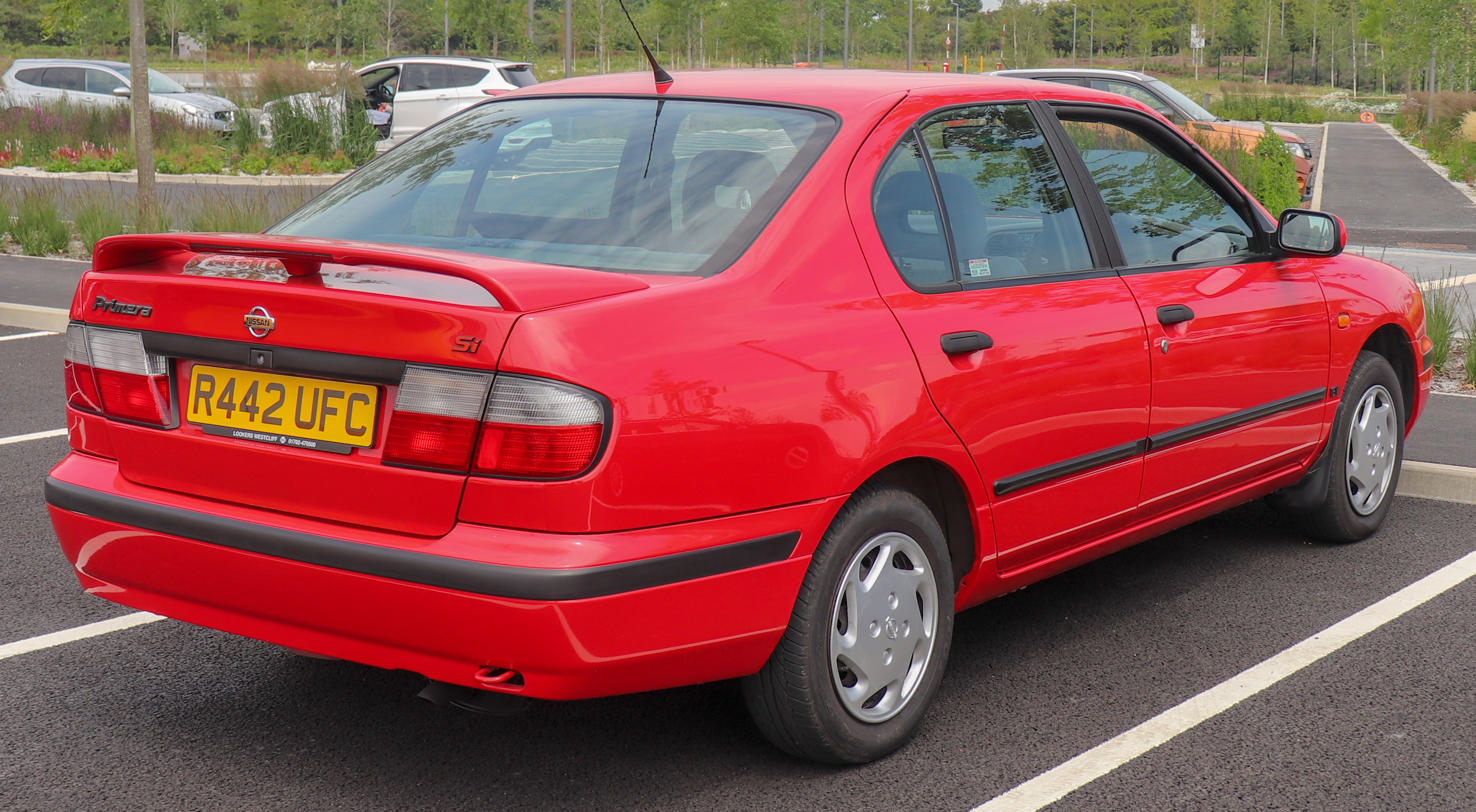
1997 Nissan Primera Si saloon (UK)

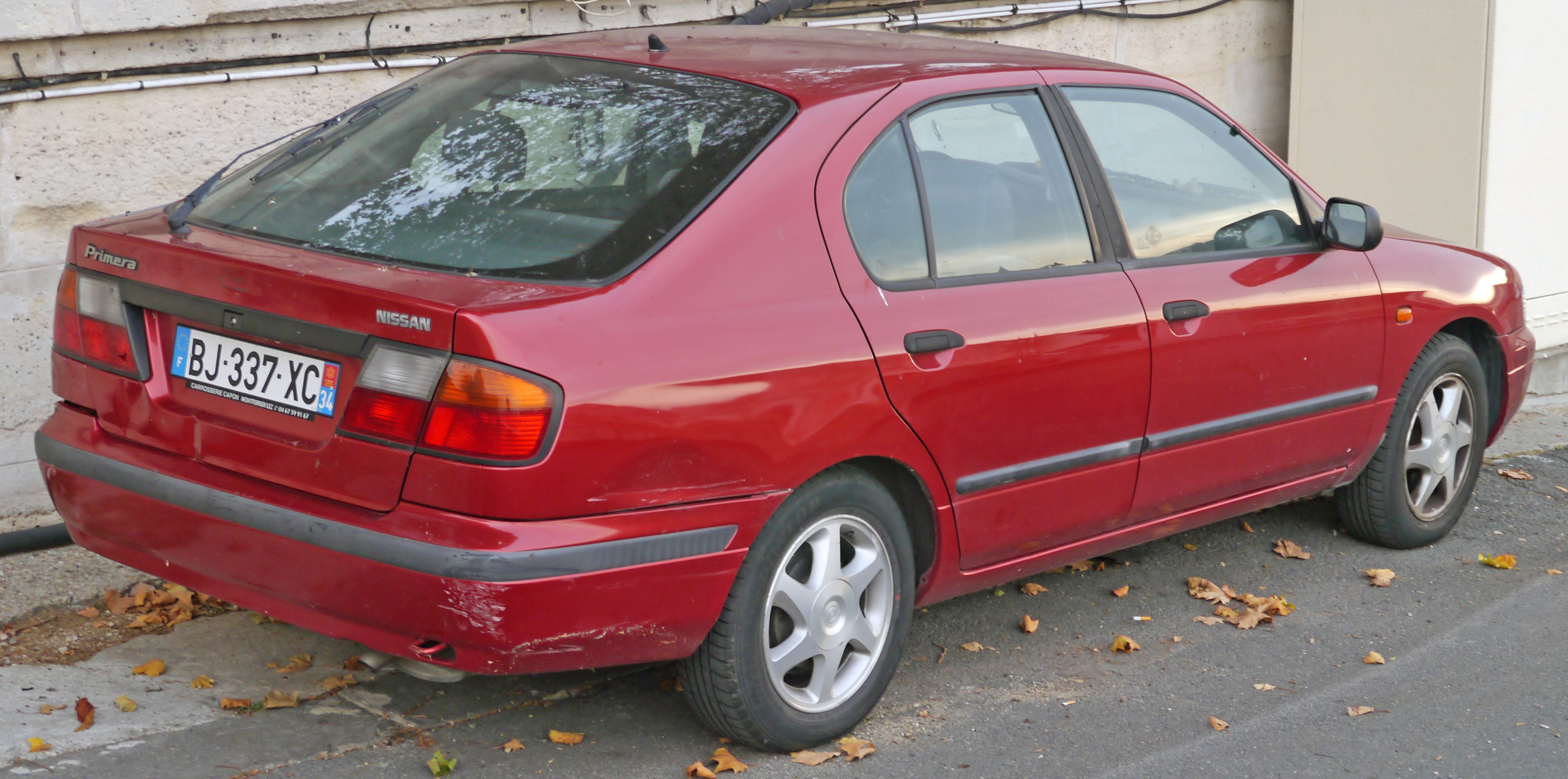
Nissan Primera hatchback (Europe)

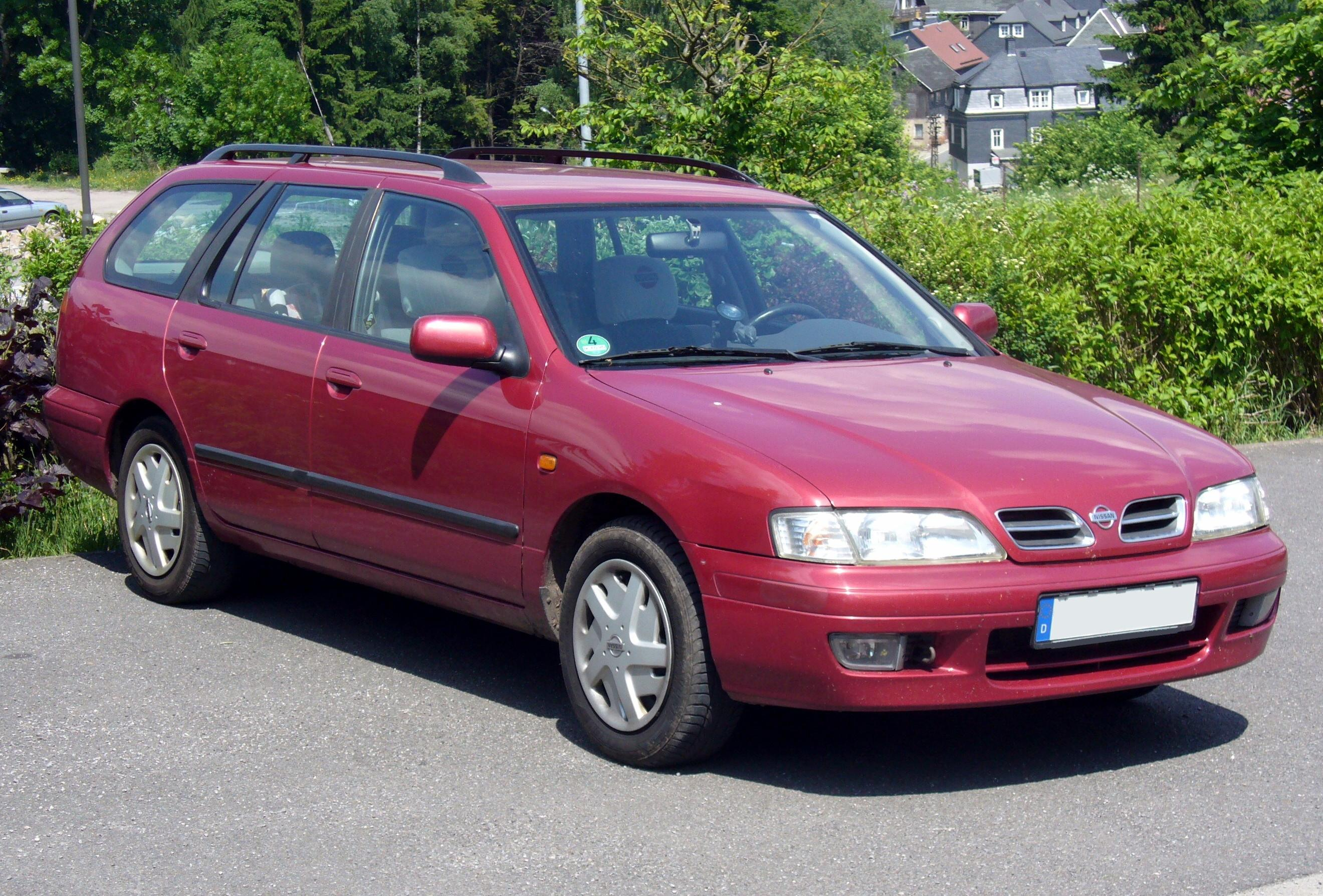
Nissan Primera Traveller (Europe)

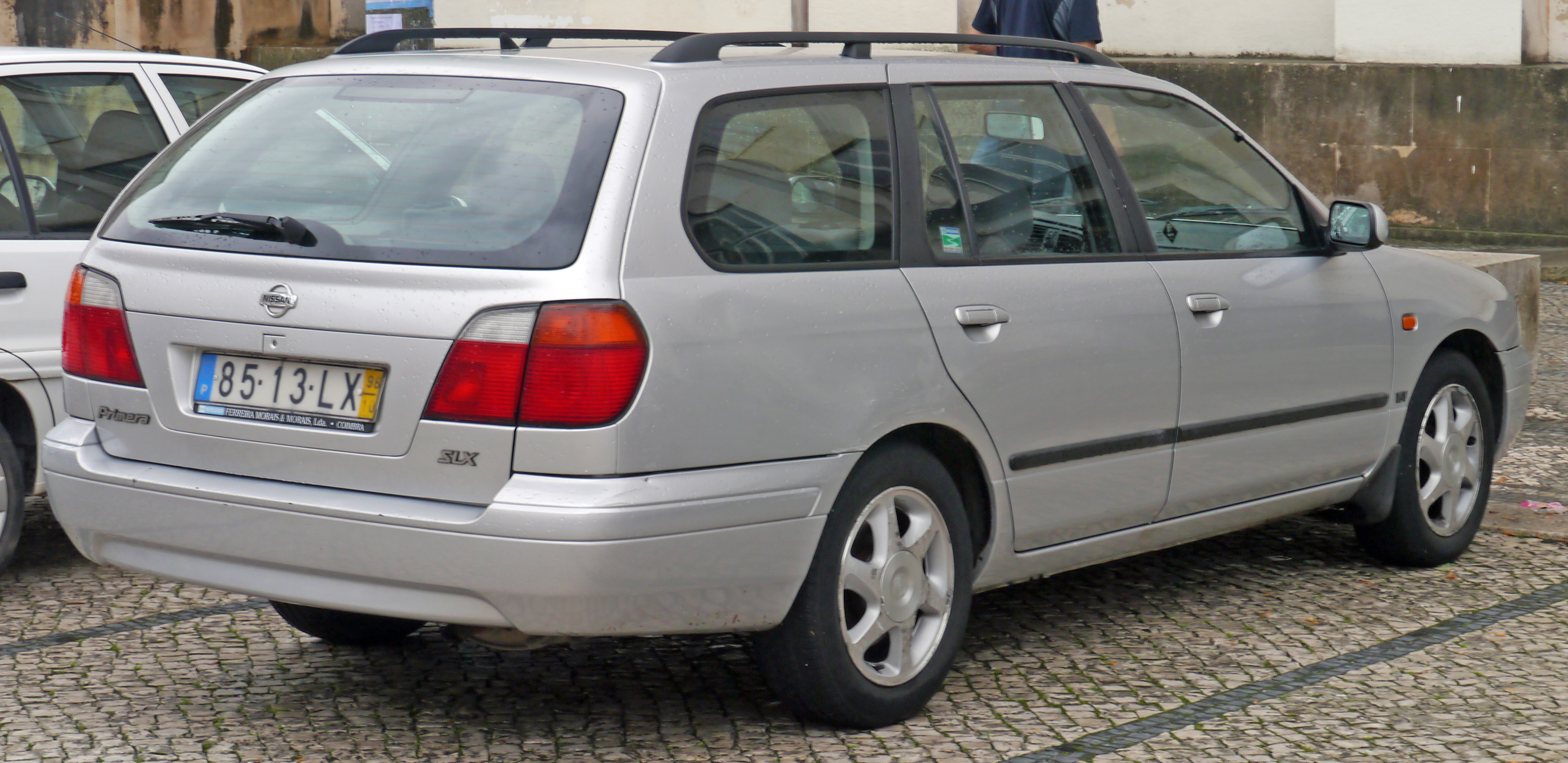
Nissan Primera SLX estate (Europe)

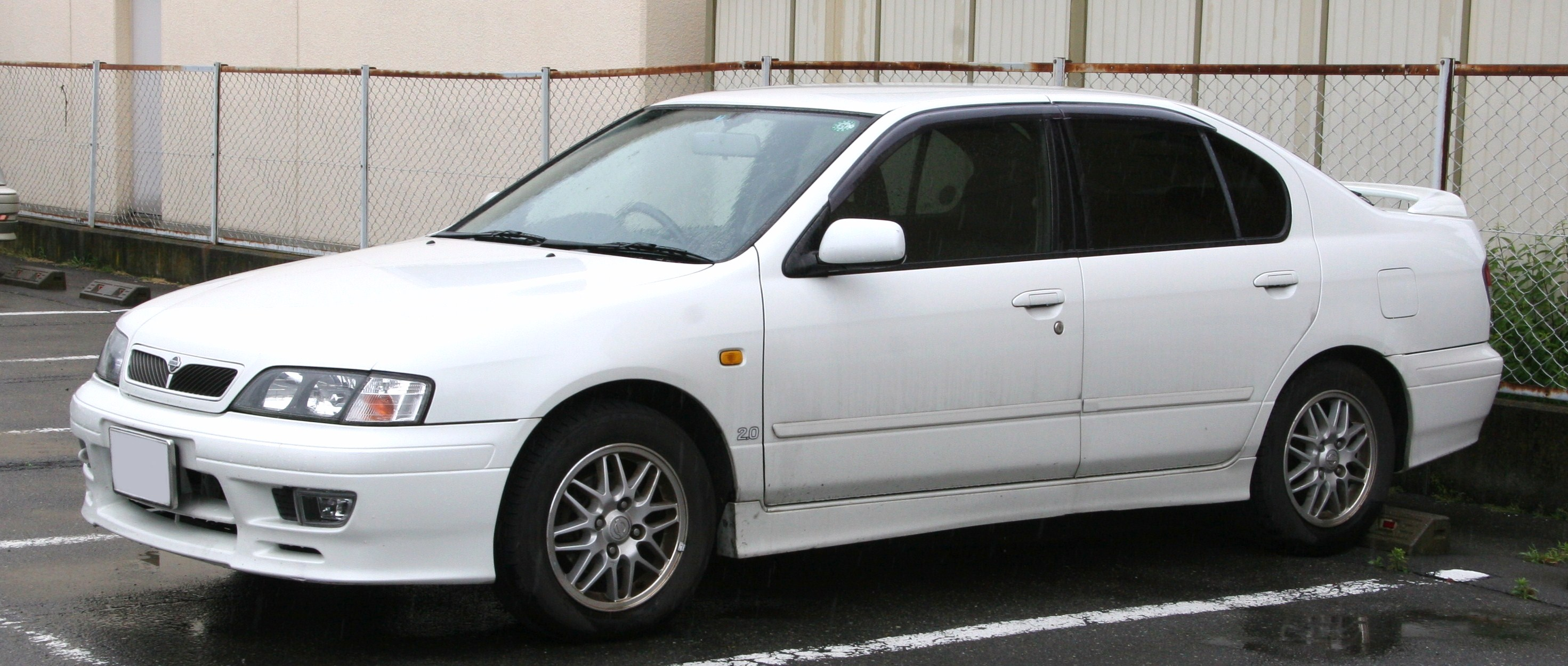
Nissan Primera Camino (Japan)

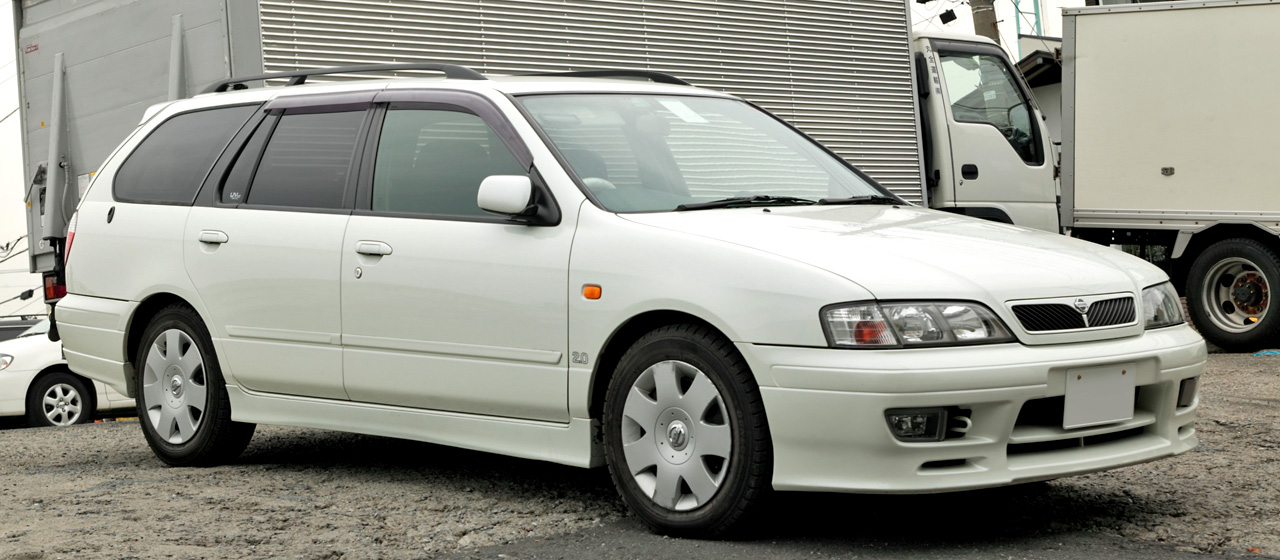
Nissan Primera Camino Wagon (Japan)

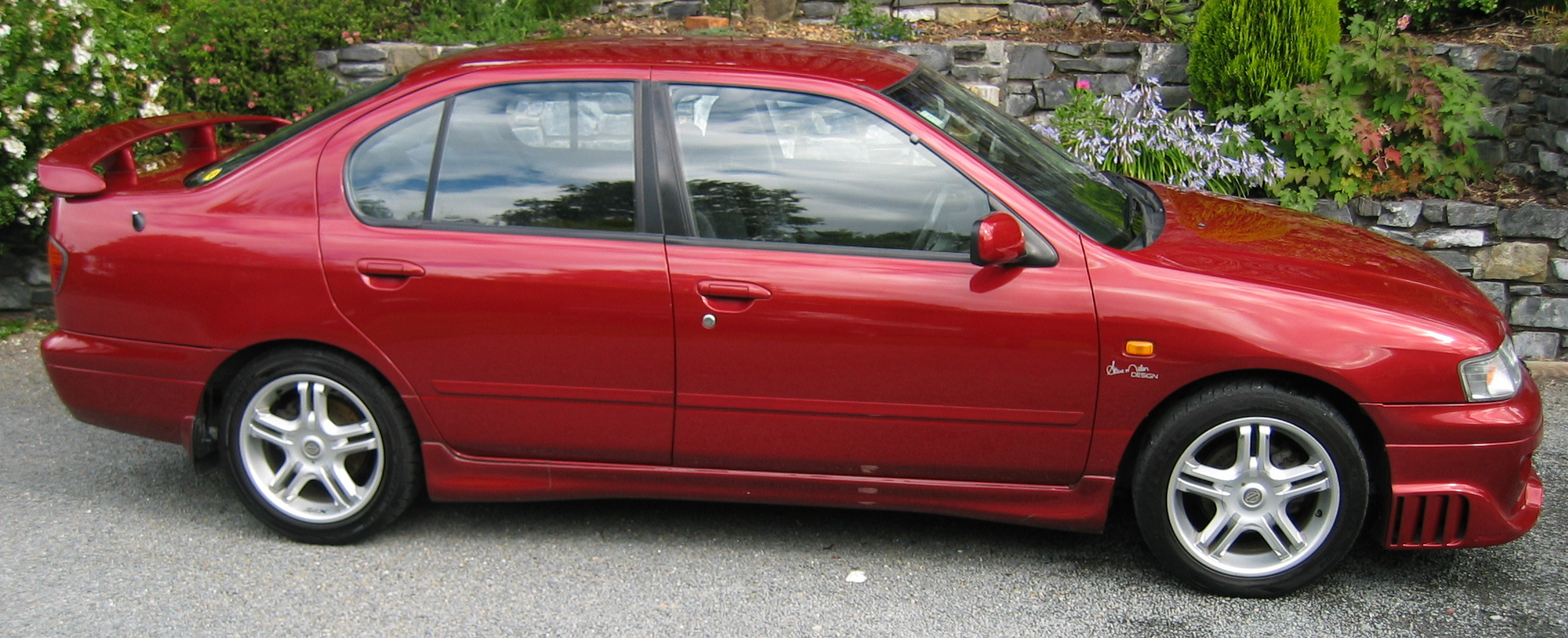
1998 Nissan Primera SMX, one of 26 built (NZ)

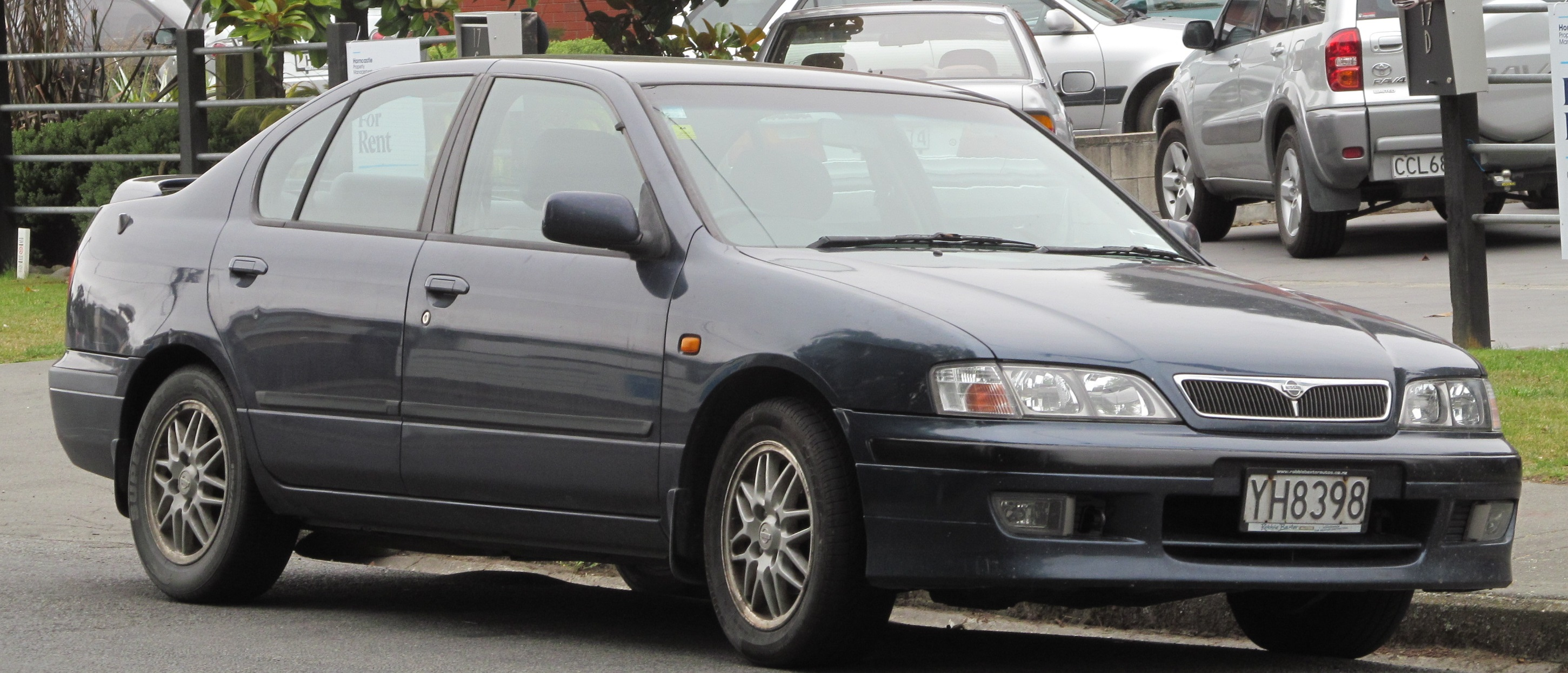
1999 Nissan Primera GXE (NZ)

=== Facelift ===
In August 1999, Nissan gave the Primera a facelift, giving it a more modern front end with clear style headlamps featuring projector units, instead of the traditional Fresnel lens type. Nissan also introduced their new corporate identity front design with the "flying wing" grille, although this was mainly applied to models marketed outside of Japan. The new code name for this model was "P11-144".

Along with the exterior changes, improved specification levels were present; entry-level models such as the "S" now featured automatic climate control, driver, passenger, and side airbags. Further up the model range, other features were seen such as xenon headlamps.

A new "lean burn" 1.8-litre petrol engine, the QG18DE was added to the range. This facelift was not generally applied outside Europe and was not available in Japan where Nissan chose to "formalize" the fronts of the Primeras and Caminos instead, bringing them into line with the look of the American Infiniti version.

2000 saw the introduction of the STCC (Swedish Touring Car Championship) limited-edition model for the Scandinavian markets. Based on the Sport model, it was lowered by 25 mm (1.0 in), and was also equipped with headlight "goggles" and a larger wing. 1,000 cars were built.

Production ended in June 2002.

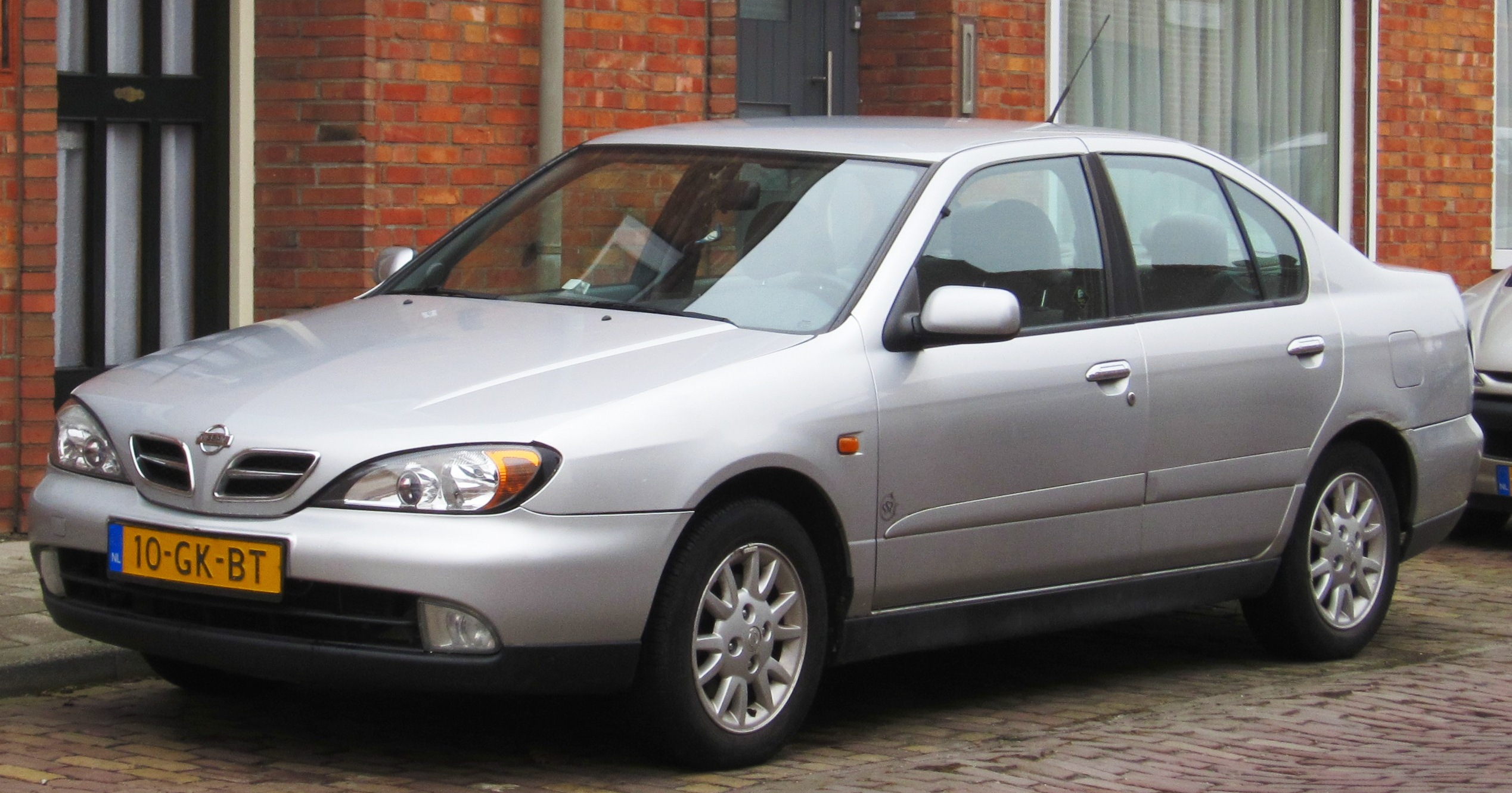
Nissan Primera sedan facelift (Europe)

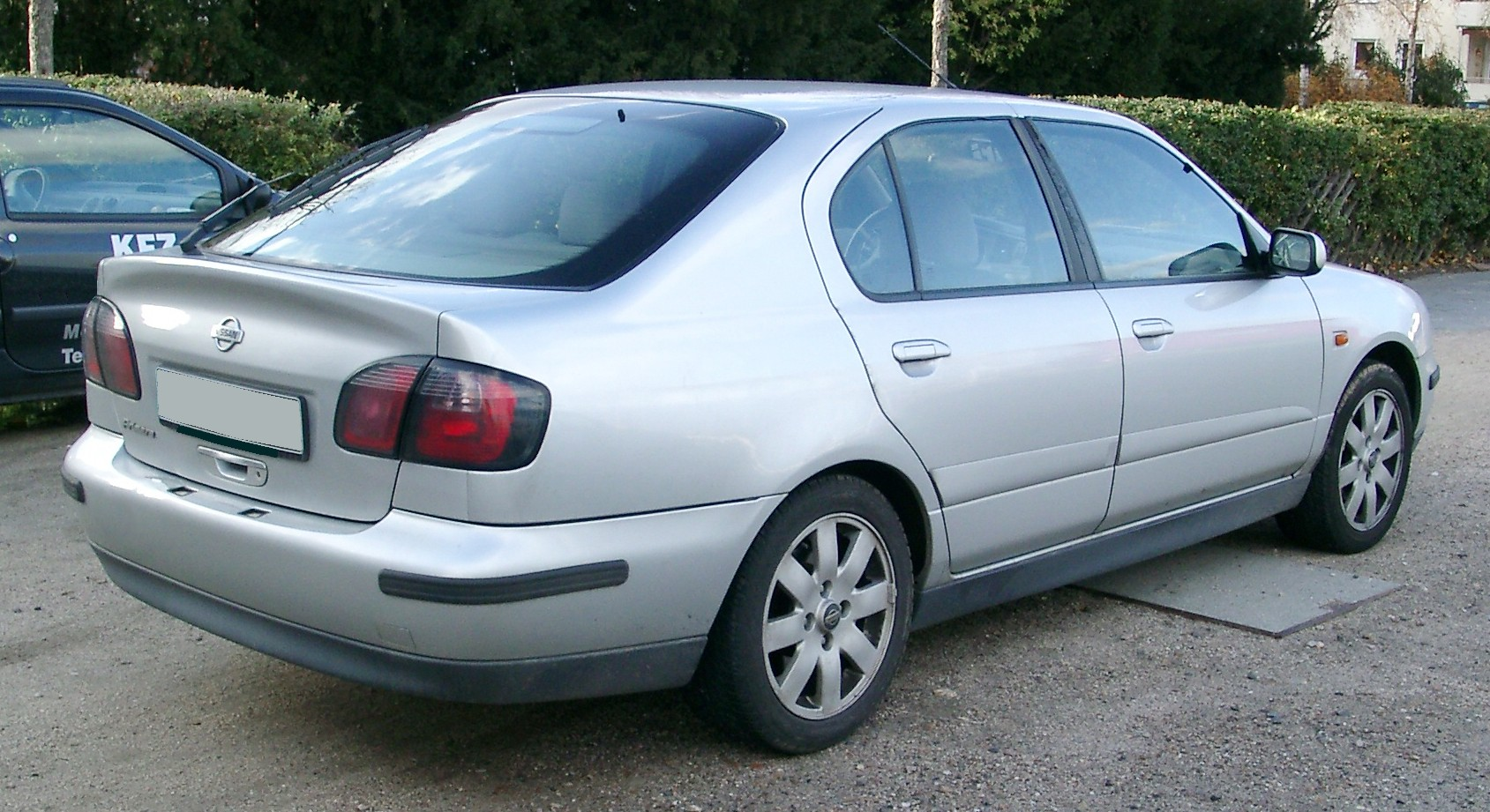
Nissan Primera hatchback facelift (Europe)

=== Motorsports ===
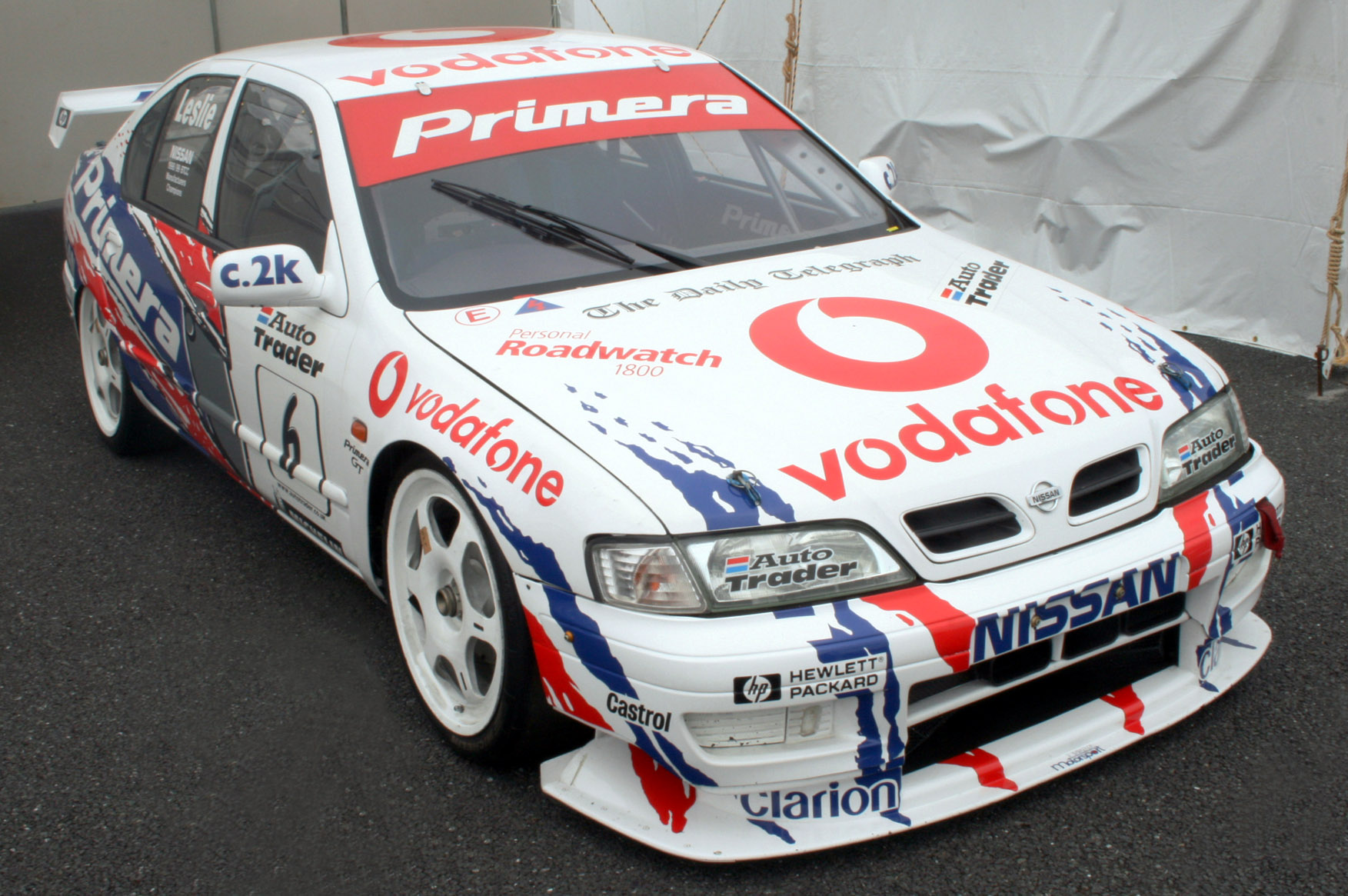
The 1999 BTCC winning Primera

The Primera won the British Touring Car Championship manufacturer's and team titles thanks to the factory backed RML team in the 1998 and 1999 as well as the Independents' Cup in 1999 and 2000.

== Third generation (P12; 2001) ==
Third generation
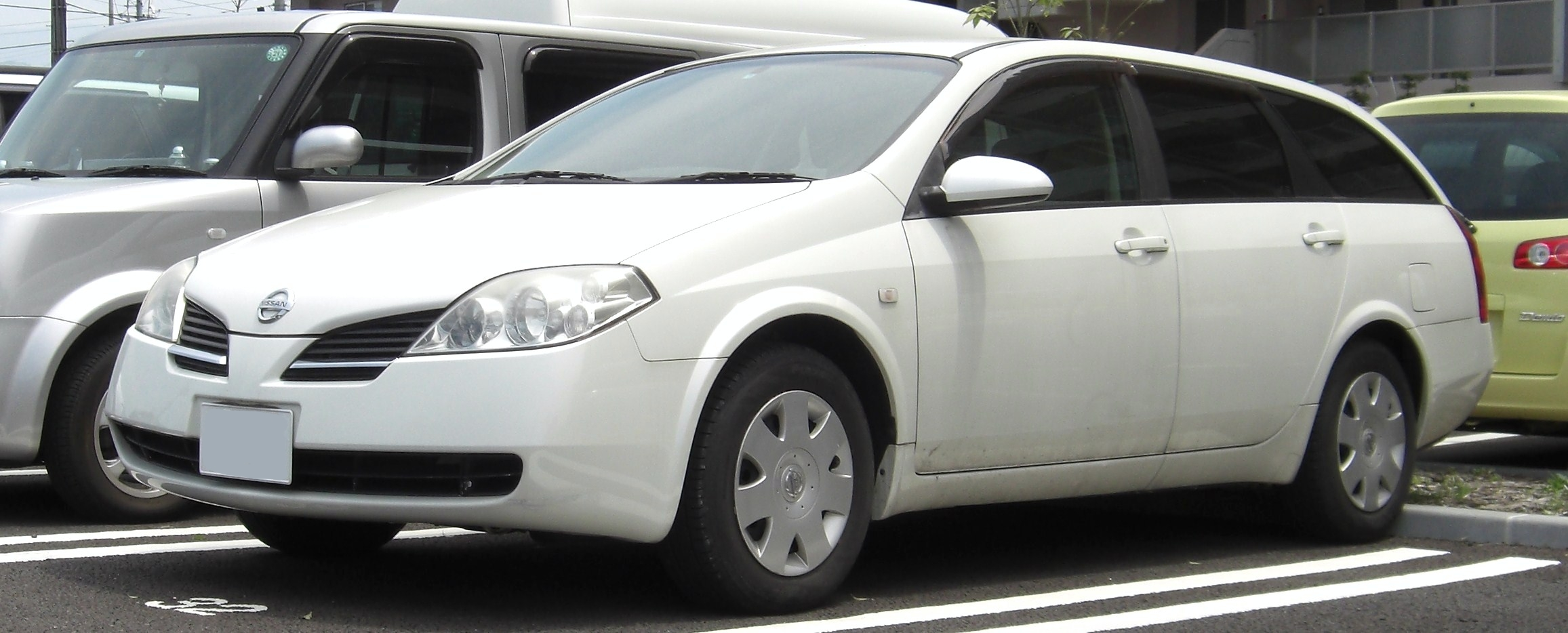
- Nissan Primera Wagon (P12) in Japan

Overview
- Model code: P12
- Production: 2001–2008; 2001–2006 (RHD)
- Assembly: Japan: Kyushu; United Kingdom: Sunderland (NMUK)
- Designer: Stéphane Schwarz (1999)

Body and chassis
- Body style: 4-door saloon 5-door liftback 5-door estate
- Platform: Nissan MS

Powertrain
- Engine: Petrol: 1.6 L QG16DE I4; 1.8 L QG18DE I4; 2.0 L QR20DE I4; 2.0 L SR20VE Neo VVL I4; 2.5 L QR25DD I4; Diesel: 1.9 L F9Q dCi common rail I4; 2.2 L YD22DDT di; 2.2 L YD22DDTi dCi common rail I4
- Transmission: 5/6-speed manual; 4-speed automatic; Hyper CVT

Dimensions
- Wheelbase: 2,704 mm (106.5 in)
- Length: 4,565 mm (179.7 in) (saloon, Liftback); 4,675 mm (184.1 in) (estate)
- Width: 1,760 mm (69.3 in)
- Height: 1,480 mm (58.3 in) (saloon, Liftback); 1,495 mm (58.9 in) (estate)

Nissan introduced the third generation Primera in Japan on January 30, 2001, its first all new car since the alliance with Renault was formed two years earlier. The new Primera was more radically styled than previous versions, expanding on the twin-blade theme of Nissan's new corporate grille. No Infiniti equivalent was released; the Skyline-based Infiniti G35 replaced the G20 in the United States. The third generation Primera made its European debut at the 2001 Frankfurt Motor Show.

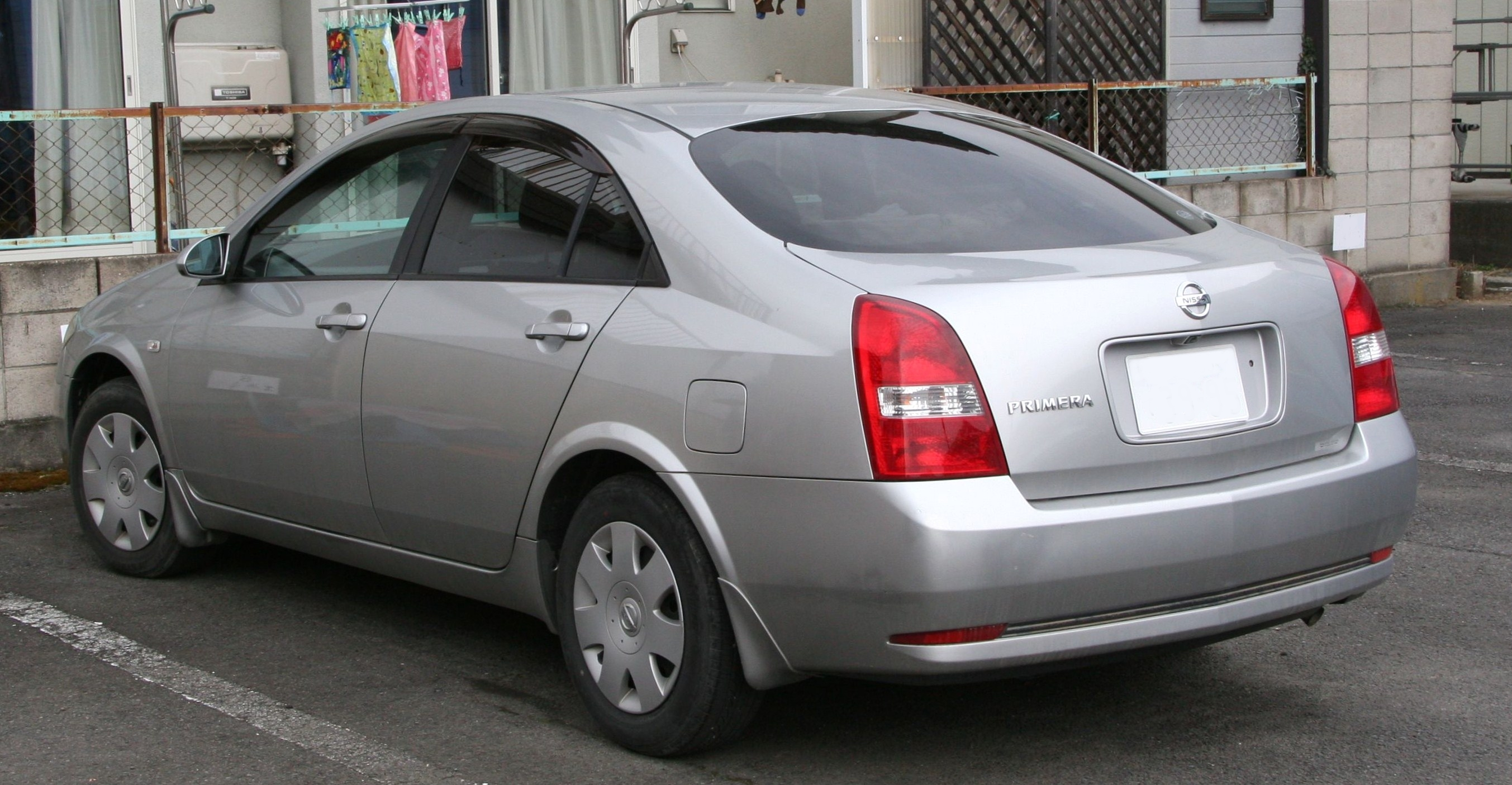
Sedan

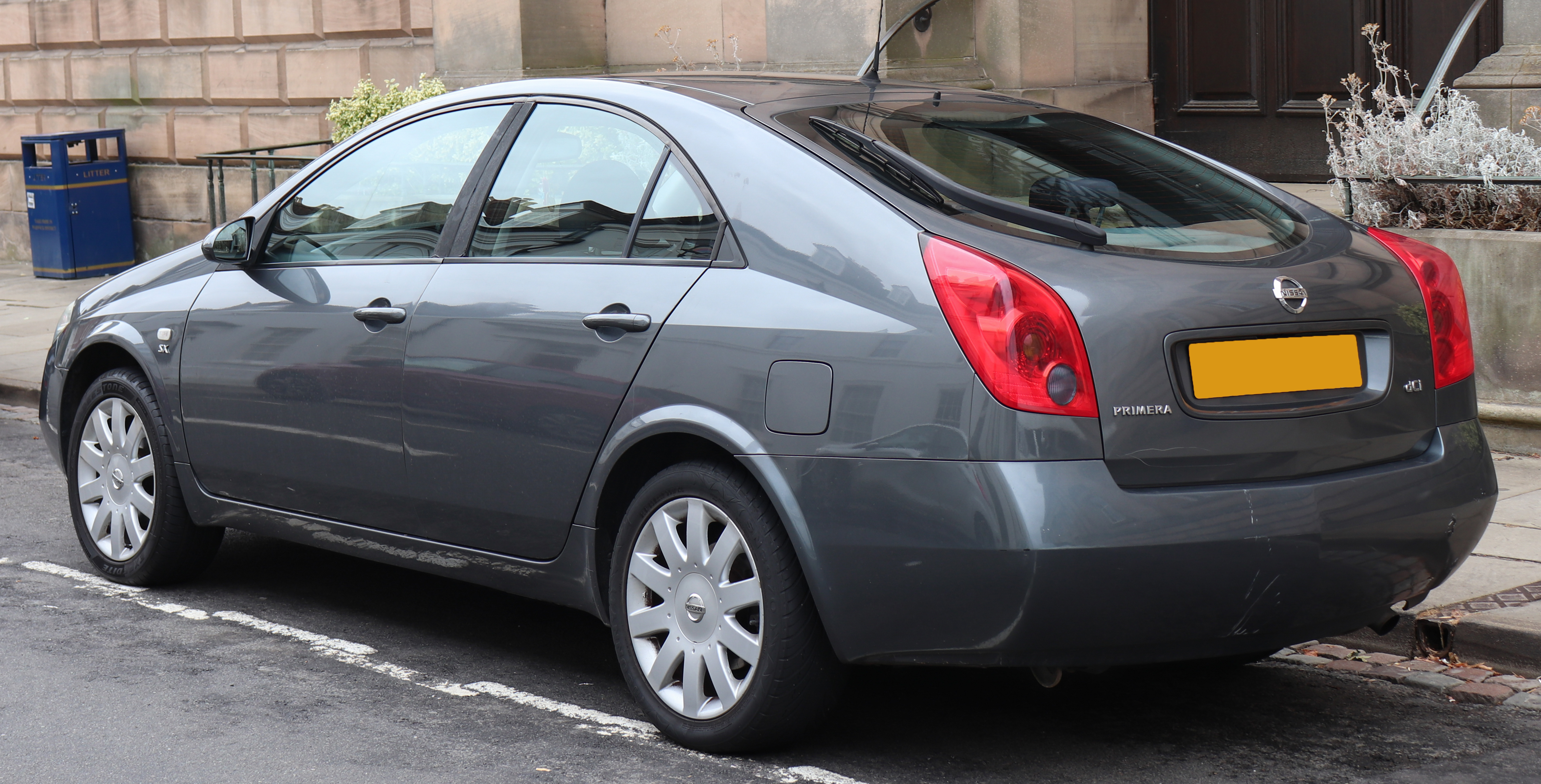
Liftback

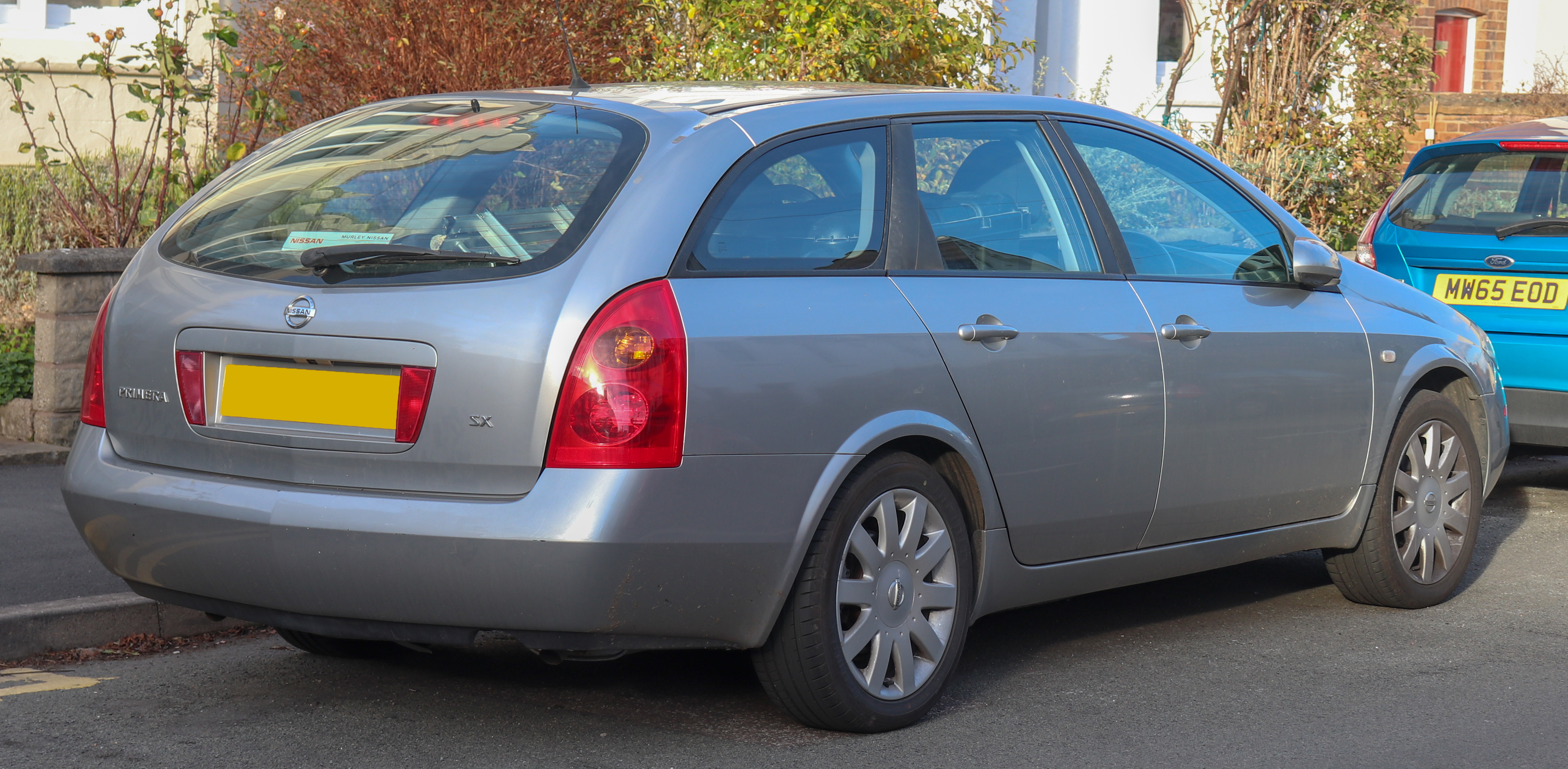
Wagon

New Zealand Primeras were introduced in 2002, and were all equipped with continuously variable transmissions; there was no manual option. Originally, Japanese-built sedans and wagons were sold in New Zealand. This remained true until 2006, when liftbacks and estates assembled in the United Kingdom became available instead. The CVT is also available in the European 2.0 L and the Japanese-made 2.0 and 2.5 L versions (the larger engine was not available in Europe). In March 2003, a 1.6-liter petrol engine was added to the lineup, while the 2.2 di was joined by a common-rail version (dCi) as well as by a smaller 1.9 dCi of Renault origins.

Falling sales caused the Primera to be withdrawn from sale in the United Kingdom in November 2006. Production of left-hand drive cars, however, continued until 2007. In Japan, production of RHD Primeras also continued until 2007. In 2010, 12 brand new Primeras appeared in the market in Ireland, after apparently having been in storage since 2006. 3 were registered in 2010, 9 in 2011.

The 2.0 L six-speed manual Nissan Primera 20V has Nissan's SR20VE Neo VVL engine with variable valve lift and timing. It produces 150 kW (204 PS) of power at 7,200 rpm and 206 N⋅m (152 lb⋅ft) of torque at 5,200 rpm.

=== Replacement ===
Speculation in the motoring press suggested that a "tweaked" version of the Nissan Altima would be the replacement, but this did not happen. In August 2006, Auto Express reported pictures of a disguised, Sentra-based prototype testing in Germany.

However, it was actually the new Nissan Sentra, which was built in Spain rather than at Sunderland for European buyers. Such was the success of the Nissan Qashqai crossover in Europe, that Nissan did not launch a direct replacement for the Primera, despite earlier plans for such a model to be developed for at least some markets in Europe.

== Nameplate use for other models ==
=== Primera EV (2026) ===
The Primera nameplate was reused for a rebadged N7 battery electric sedan that was first unveiled in the Philippines on 4 June 2026. The Primera was officially launched alongside the Navara Pro PHEV on 6 November 2026.

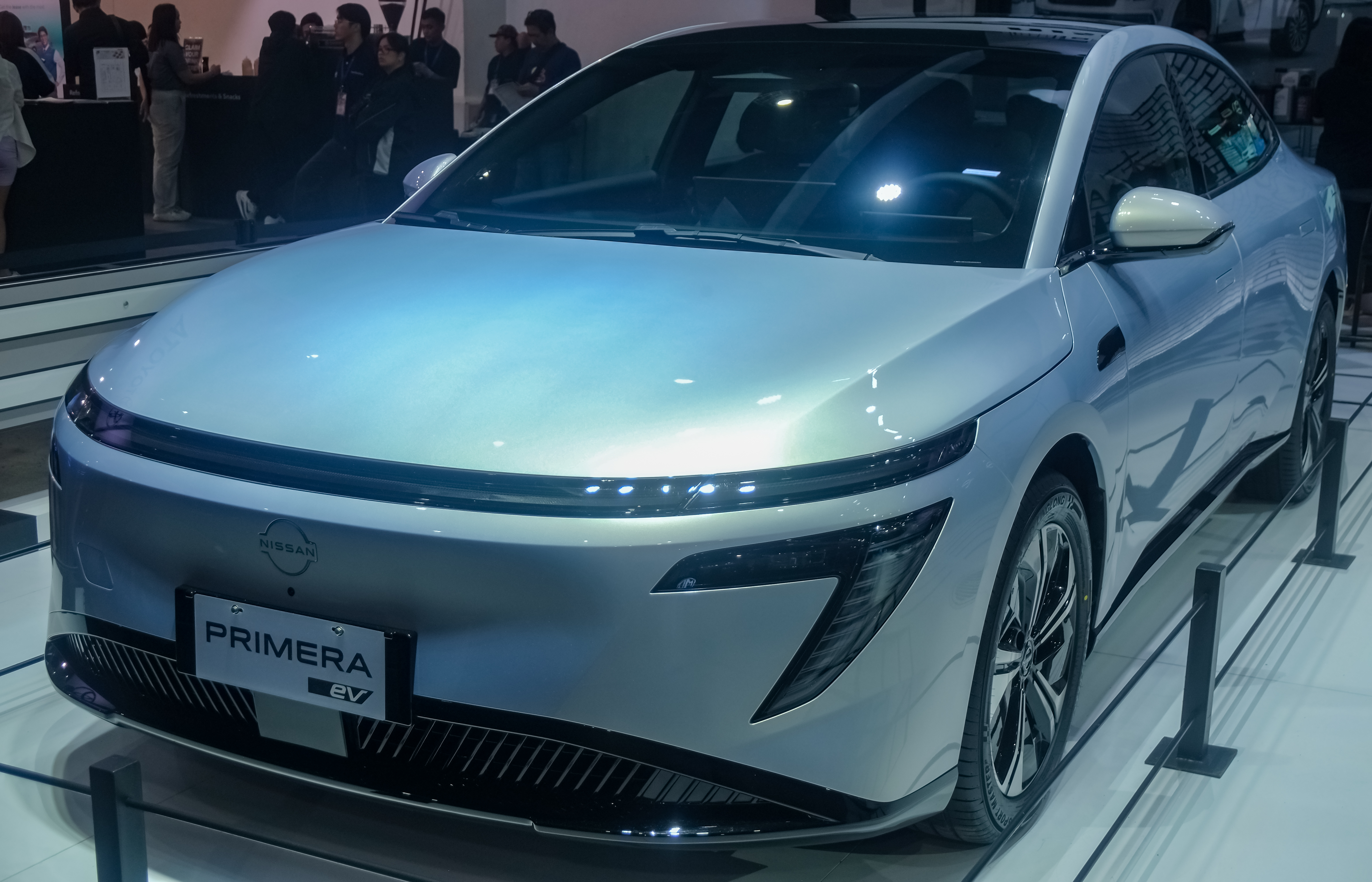
Primera EV

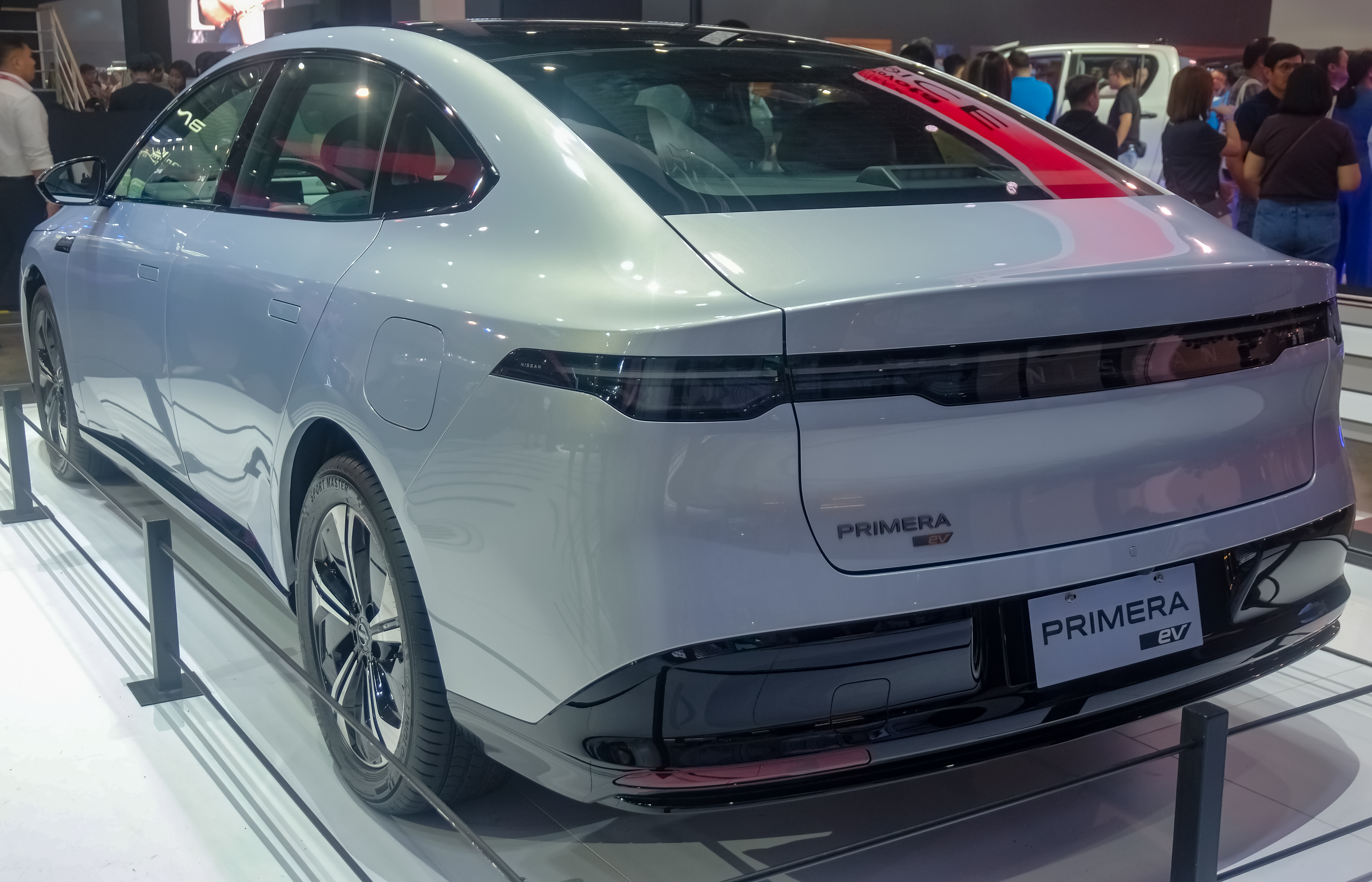
Rear view
