= Nissan CD engine =

CD engine
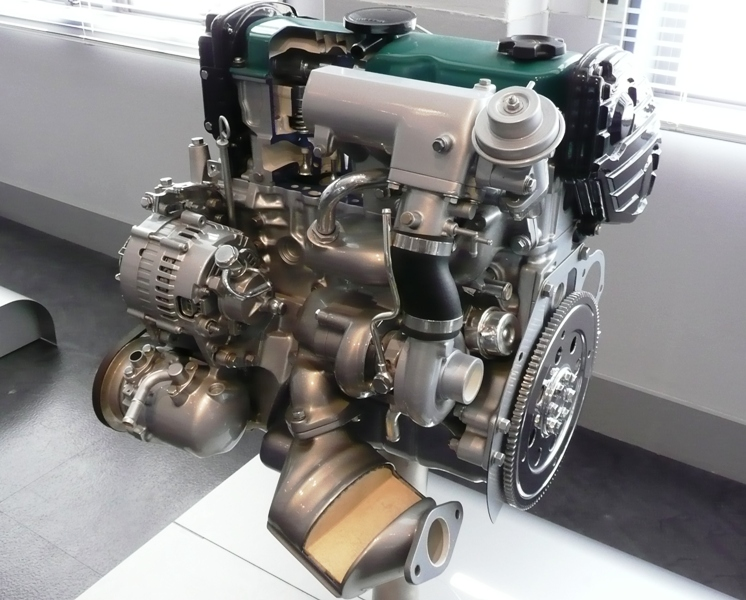
- CD20T engine at the Nissan Engine Museum

Overview
- Manufacturer: Nissan

Layout
- Displacement: 1.7–2.0 L (1,680–1,974 cc)
- Cylinder bore: 80.0 mm (3.15 in); 84.5 mm (3.33 in)
- Piston stroke: 83.6 mm (3.29 in); 88.0 mm (3.46 in)
- Cylinder block material: Cast iron
- Cylinder head material: Aluminium

Combustion
- Turbocharger: On some versions
- Fuel type: Diesel
- Cooling system: Water-cooled

Output
- Power output: 55–105 PS (40–77 kW; 54–104 bhp)
- Torque output: 10.6–22.5 kg⋅m (104–221 N⋅m; 77–163 lb⋅ft)

Chronology
- Predecessor: Nissan L engine
- Successor: Nissan YD engine

The Nissan CD engine is a diesel version of the Nissan CA engine that replaced the Nissan LD four-cylinder engine. Part of Nissan's PLASMA engine family, it was available in two displacements: 1.7 and 2.0 litres. They have a cast-iron block and alloy head. It was used from 1980 to the late 1990s until it was replaced by the Nissan YD engine.

== CD17 ==
The CD17 family displaces 1.7 L (1,680 cc; 102.5 cu in), from a bore and stroke of 80 mm × 83.6 mm (3.15 in × 3.29 in). Built to be as light as possible, the engine walls were made thinner by the use of fins where extra strength was needed, while lateral ribs helped reduce vibration and noise. A new, two-stage glowplug meant that even cold starting times were rarely more than a few seconds.

=== CD17 (early) ===
- 61 PS (45 kW; 60 bhp) at 5000 rpm
- 10.6 kg⋅m (104 N⋅m; 77 lb⋅ft) at 2800 rpm
- 1982–1985 Nissan Sunny B11
- 1983–1986 Nissan Pulsar/Cherry N12
- 1983–1986 Nissan Langley N12
- 1983–1986 Nissan Laurel Spirit B11
- 1982–1990 Nissan AD VB11

US market specifications

- 55 hp SAE net (41 kW; 56 PS) at 4800 rpm
- 75 lb⋅ft SAE net (102 N⋅m) at 2800 rpm
- 1983–1986 Nissan Sentra B11

=== CD17 (late) ===
- 55 PS (40 kW; 54 bhp) at 5000 rpm
- 10.6 kg⋅m (104 N⋅m; 77 lb⋅ft) at 2800 rpm
- 1985–1995 Nissan Sunny B12-B13
- 1986–1995 Nissan Pulsar N13-N14
- 1986–1990 Nissan Langley N13
- 1986–1990 Nissan Laurel Spirit B12
- 1990–1998 Nissan AD Y10

=== CD17T ===
- Turbocharged
- 73 PS (54 kW; 72 bhp) DIN
- 14.8 kg⋅m (145 N⋅m; 107 lb⋅ft)
- 1984–198? Nissan Stanza T11 (Belgium, possibly other markets)

== CD20 ==
The CD20 family displaces 2.0 L (1,974 cc; 120.5 cu in), thanks to an increased bore and stroke of 84.5 mm × 88 mm (3.33 in × 3.46 in). The swirl chambers were given additional ports, while the glow plugs were now arranged horizontally. Aside from being more powerful, the CD20 was quieter and more durable than its predecessor.

=== CD20 (initial model) ===
- 76 PS (56 kW; 75 bhp) at 4800 rpm
- 13.5 kg⋅m (132 N⋅m; 98 lb⋅ft) at 2800 rpm
- 1991–1993 Nissan Serena C23
- 1990–1998 Nissan Avenir Cargo VSW10
- 1994–1998 Nissan Sunny B14
- 1995–1999 Nissan Pulsar N15
- 1996–1999 Nissan Wingroad Y10
- 1995–2000 Nissan Almera N15
- 1992–1995 Nissan Primera P10
- 1997–1999 Nissan AD Y10

=== CD20E ===
- Electronically controlled
- 76 PS (56 kW; 75 bhp) at 4800 rpm
- 13.5 kg⋅m (132 N⋅m; 98 lb⋅ft) at 2800 rpm
- 1998–2001 Nissan Bluebird U14

=== CD20T ===
- Turbocharged
- 91 PS (67 kW; 90 bhp) at 4400 rpm
- 17.7 kg⋅m (174 N⋅m; 128 lb⋅ft) at 2400 rpm
- 1993–1998 Nissan Avenir W10
- 1991–1996 Nissan Serena C23
- 1996–2002 Nissan Primera P11E

=== CD20Ti ===
- Turbocharged and intercooled
- 100 PS (74 kW; 99 bhp) at 4000 rpm
- 21 kg⋅m (206 N⋅m; 152 lb⋅ft) at 2400 rpm
- 1993–1995 Nissan Largo W30

=== CD20ET1 ===
- Electronically controlled and turbocharged
- 97 PS (71 kW; 96 bhp) at 4000 rpm
- 20 kg⋅m (196 N⋅m; 145 lb⋅ft) at 2400 rpm
- 1997–1999 Nissan Serena C23

=== CD20ET2 ===
- Electronically controlled and turbocharged
- 91 PS (67 kW; 90 bhp) at 4400 rpm
- 19.5 kg⋅m (191 N⋅m; 141 lb⋅ft) at 2400 rpm
- 1998–2000 Nissan Avenir W11

=== CD20ETi ===
- Electronically controlled and turbocharged with intercooler
- 105 PS (77 kW; 104 bhp) at 4000 rpm
- 22.5 kg⋅m (221 N⋅m; 163 lb⋅ft) at 2000 rpm
- 1995–1999 Nissan Largo W30

== See also ==
- List of Nissan engines
