= Nissan QR engine =

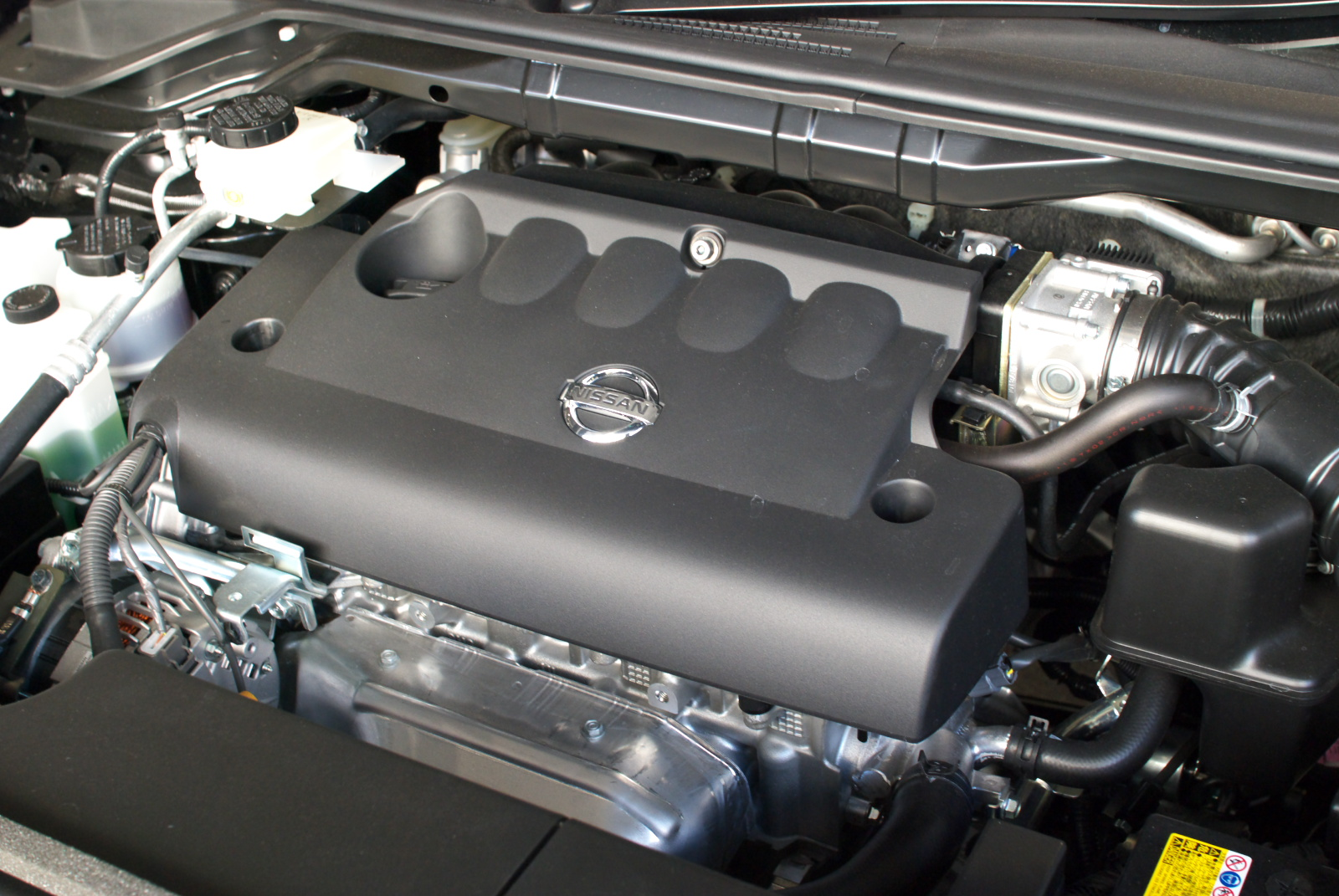
- A Nissan QR25DE Engine

Overview
- Manufacturer: Nissan (Nissan Machinery)
- Production: 1999–present

Layout
- Configuration: Inline-four
- Displacement: 2.0 L (1,998 cc); 2.5 L (2,488 cc)
- Cylinder bore: 89 mm (3.5 in)
- Piston stroke: 80.3 mm (3.16 in); 100 mm (3.94 in)
- Cylinder block material: Aluminum
- Cylinder head material: Aluminum
- Valvetrain: DOHC 4 valves x cyl. with VVT
- Compression ratio: 9.1:1-10.5:1

Combustion
- Supercharger: On QR25DER only
- Fuel system: Port Fuel Injection or Direct Fuel Injection
- Fuel type: Gasoline
- Cooling system: Water-cooled

Output
- Power output: 103–186 kW (140–253 PS; 138–250 hp)
- Torque output: 200–330 N⋅m (148–243 lb⋅ft)

Chronology
- Predecessor: Nissan SR engine Nissan KA engine
- Successor: Nissan MR engine (only for QR20DE); Nissan PR engine (only for QR25DE)

The QR family of inline-four piston engines by Nissan were introduced in 1999 and range from 2.0 to 2.5 L (1,998 to 2,488 cc) in displacement. These motors are aluminum, dual overhead camshaft (DOHC), four-valve designs with variable valve timing and optional direct injection. The engine shares much of its architecture with the YD diesel engine.

== QR20DE ==
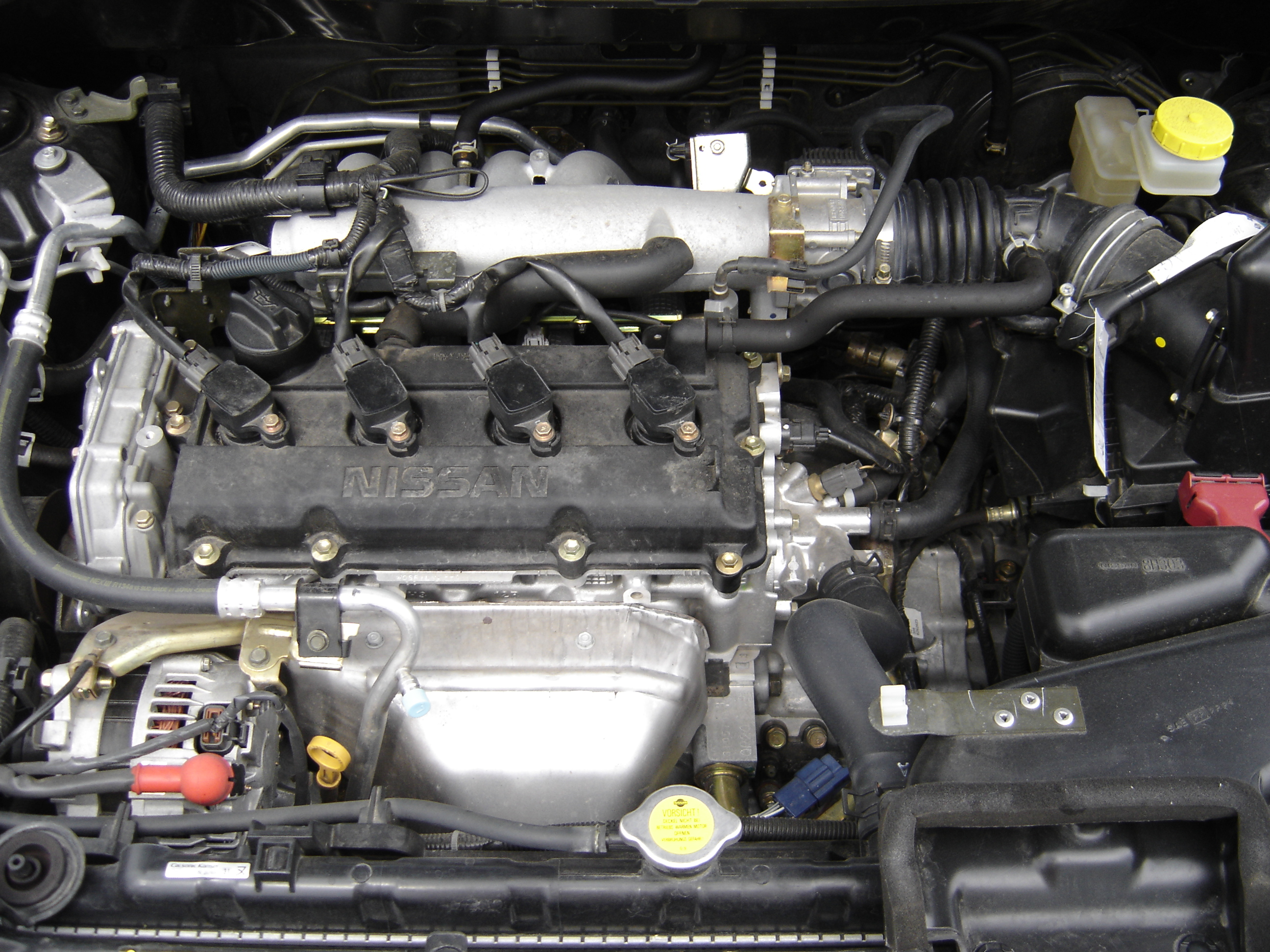
QR20DE

The 2.0 L (1,998 cc) QR20DE produces 140 PS (103 kW; 138 hp) at 6000 rpm and 200 N⋅m (148 lb⋅ft) at 4000 rpm. The bore and stroke is 89 mm × 80.3 mm (3.50 in × 3.16 in) and a compression ratio of 9.9:1. The QR20DE was replaced with the MR20DE engine in most applications in early 2005.

Vehicle applications:

- 2001-2007 Nissan X-Trail T30, 140 PS (103 kW)
- 2001-2007 Nissan Primera P12
- 2002–present Nissan Serena C24, 145 PS (107 kW)
- 2003-2008 Nissan Teana J31, 145 PS (107 kW)
- 2001-2005 Nissan Wingroad Y11
- 2002-2005 Nissan Avenir W11
- 2001-2004 Nissan Prairie M12
- 2007-2020 Nissan Atlas F24
- 2014-present Nissan Urvan E26

== QR20DD ==
The QR20DD is similar to the QR20DE but features NEO direct injection to improve fuel economy and to reduce emissions. It produces 150 PS (110 kW; 148 hp) at 6000 rpm and 200 N⋅m (148 lb⋅ft) at 4400 rpm.

Vehicle applications:

- 2000-2004 Nissan Bluebird Sylphy

== QR25DE ==
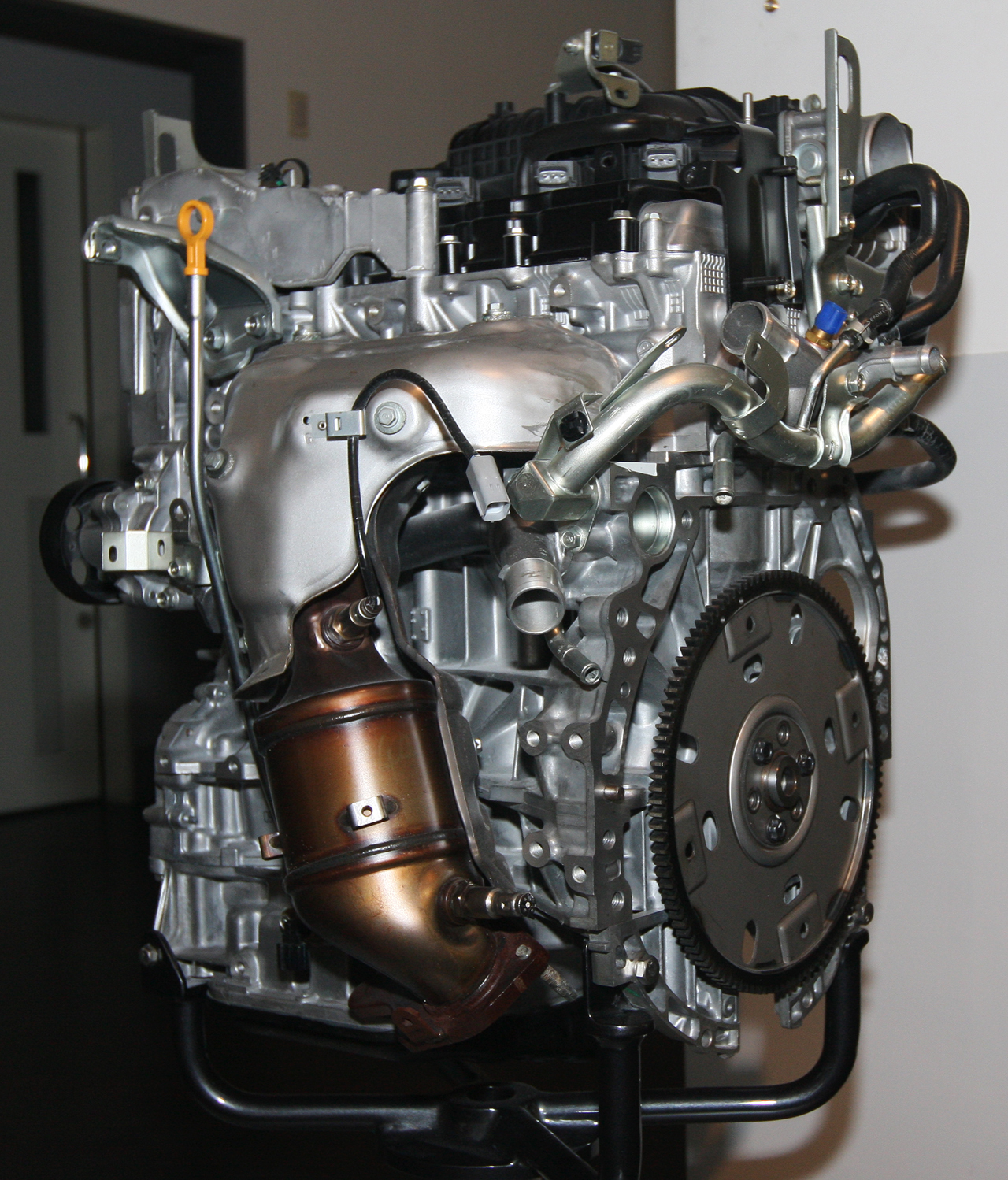
Nissan QR25DE Engine

The QR25DE is a 2.5 L (2,488 cc) variant built with cast steel connecting rods, a steel timing chain, counter-rotating balance shafts, and an aluminum intake manifold. The engine bore and stroke is 89 mm × 100 mm (3.50 in × 3.94 in) and a compression ratio ranging from 9.5:1 to 10.5:1 depending on the vehicle.

Output is rated 175 hp (130 kW; 177 PS) at 6000 rpm with 244 N⋅m (180 lb⋅ft) of torque at 4000 rpm in the Altima 2.5 and Sentra SE-R models. The Sentra SE-R Spec V originally claimed 180 hp, but this was adjusted downward to 175 once production started in late 2001. The redline is 6100 rpm. Altimas that are PZEV compliant create 170 hp (127 kW; 172 PS) and 175 lb⋅ft (237 N⋅m) of torque. In the 2005+ Nissan Frontier the QR25DE generates 152 hp (113 kW; 154 PS) and 171 lb⋅ft (232 N⋅m) of torque.

=== 2007+ QR25DE ===
The revised QR25DE found in the 2007+ Sentra, Altima, Rogue, etc. has a number of improvements over the older QR25DE. These include:

- A simpler, larger diameter single path resin intake manifold replaced the old dual path design. (Note: California emissions models do have a swirl control valve located in the intake)
- Revised piston crown shape to support a higher compression ratio of 9.6:1.(10.5:1 in Sentra SE-R Spec V.)
- The balancer system has been moved back slightly from the crank pulley to a more centric location in the block.
- Revised cam shaft profile.
- Reinforced connecting rods only available in the Sentra SE-R Spec V 2007-2012 .
- Reduced friction likely through Nissan's extensive use of coatings on pistons, journal bearings, etc.
- Additional engine mount on the top of the motor, pulley side.
- Higher rev limit and improved power output.
Vehicle applications:
- 1999–2003 Nissan Bassara 165 hp (123 kW; 167 PS)
- 2001–2005 Nissan Serena C24 158 hp (118 kW; 160 PS)
- 2001–2007 Nissan X-Trail T30 APEC export version 178 hp (133 kW; 180 PS)
- 2002–2006 Nissan Sentra SE-R 165 hp (123 kW; 167 PS) & SE-R Spec V 175 hp (130 kW; 177 PS)
- 2002–2009 Nissan Presage 165 hp (123 kW; 167 PS)
- 2002–2020 Nissan Altima 170 hp (127 kW; 172 PS) to 182 hp (136 kW; 185 PS)
- 2003–2005 Nissan Teana 160 hp (119 kW; 162 PS)
- 2003–2014 Nissan Murano (Japan)
- 2005–2019 Nissan Frontier 152 hp (113 kW; 154 PS)
- 2007–2012 Nissan Sentra SE-R 177 hp (132 kW; 179 PS) & SE-R Spec V 200 hp (149 kW; 203 PS)
- 2007–2011 Nissan Altima Hybrid 158 hp (118 kW; 160 PS), combined 198 hp (148 kW; 201 PS)
- 2007–2020 Nissan X-Trail T31 169 hp (126 kW; 171 PS)
- 2007–2023 Renault Koleos TR25 169 hp (126 kW; 171 PS)
- 2008–2020 Nissan Rogue 170 hp (127 kW; 172 PS)
- 2009–2012 Suzuki Equator 152 hp (113 kW; 154 PS)
- 2010–present Nissan Elgrand E52
- 2013–2020 Nissan Teana 165 hp (123 kW; 167 PS)
- 2013–present Nissan X-Trail T32 169 hp (126 kW; 171 PS)
- 2014-present Nissan Urvan E26
- 2018–present Nissan Terra- 180 hp (134 kW; 182 PS)165 hp (123 kW; 167 PS)
- 2020–present Nissan X-Terra-

== QR25DD ==
The QR25DD is similar to the QR25DE but increases the compression ratio to 10.5:1 and includes direct injection. This engine is also the first QR to use DLC coating on the valve lifter buckets for reduced friction. It produces 125 kW (170 PS; 168 hp) at 5600 rpm and 245 N⋅m (181 lb⋅ft) at 4000 rpm.

Vehicle applications:

- 2002-2006 Nissan Primera P12 (JDM)

== QR25DER ==
The QR25DER is similar to the QR25DE but has a supercharger for increased power and is coupled with a 15 kW (20 hp) electric motor, Dual Clutch System, and lithium-ion battery for increased fuel efficiency. The engine has a compression ratio of 9.1:1 (10.0:1 in 2014 Infiniti QX70) and produces a combined 250 hp (186 kW; 253 PS) at 5600 rpm and 243 lb⋅ft (329 N⋅m) at 3600 rpm.

Vehicle applications:

- 2014 - 2015 Nissan Pathfinder Hybrid
- 2016 only Nissan Murano Hybrid
- 2014 - 2017 Infiniti QX60 Hybrid

== See also ==
- List of Nissan engines
