= Nissan KA engine =

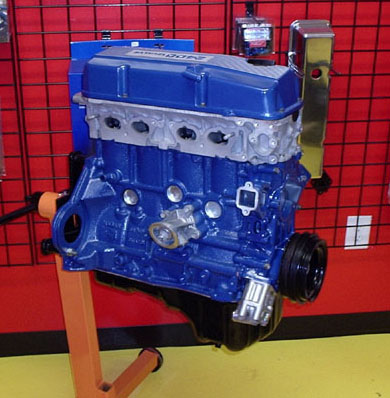

Overview
- Manufacturer: Nissan (Nissan Machinery)
- Production: 1988–2021

Layout
- Configuration: Naturally aspirated Inline-4
- Displacement: 2.0 L (1,998 cc); 2.4 L (2,389 cc)
- Cylinder bore: 86 mm (3.4 in); 89 mm (3.5 in)
- Piston stroke: 86 mm (3.4 in); 96 mm (3.78 in)
- Cylinder block material: Cast iron
- Cylinder head material: Aluminum
- Valvetrain: SOHC 2- or 3 valves x cyl. (1988-1997); DOHC 4 valves x cyl. (1991-2016)
- Compression ratio: 8.6:1, 9.1:1, 9.2:1, 9.5:1

Combustion
- Fuel system: Sequential electronic FI
- Management: Hitachi
- Fuel type: Gasoline
- Cooling system: Water-cooled

Output
- Power output: 134 hp (100 kW) (1988-1996); 155 hp (116 kW) (1996-2004); 143 hp (107 kW) (1998-2004 Frontier & Xterra)
- Torque output: 152 lb⋅ft (206 N⋅m) at 4400 rpm (1988-1996); 160 lb⋅ft (217 N⋅m) at 4400 rpm (1996-2004)

Chronology
- Predecessor: Nissan Z engine
- Successor: Nissan QR engine

The KA engines were a series of four-stroke inline-four gasoline piston engines manufactured by Nissan, which were offered in 2.0 and 2.4 L. The engines blocks were made of cast-iron, while the cylinder heads were made of aluminum.

Despite their large capacity, this motor was not equipped with balance shafts.

When used in the passenger cars both versions of the KA24 used a crankshaft girdle, as opposed to individual main bearing caps. In the Nissan Hardbody and Frontier applications a crank girdle was not used.

== KA20 ==
=== KA20DE ===
The KA20DE was a DOHC 16-valve engine produced from June 1999 through August 2007. It was mainly used in Japanese Domestic Market commercial vehicles.

Specifications

- Bore × Stroke: 86 mm × 86 mm (3.39 in × 3.39 in)
- Max power: 120 PS (88 kW) at 5200 rpm (Caravan E24/E25, Atlas F23); 125 PS (92 kW) at 5600 rpm (Datsun Truck D22)
- Max torque: 169 N⋅m (125 lb⋅ft) at 2800 rpm (Caravan E24/Atlas F23); 171 N⋅m (126 lb⋅ft) at 2800 rpm (Caravan E25); 175 N⋅m (129 lb⋅ft) at 3200 rpm (Datsun Truck D22)
- Valve Configuration: DOHC, 16 valves
- Compression ratio: 9.5:1

Applications

- 1999.06-2007.06 Nissan Atlas (F23)
- 1999.06-2001.04 Nissan Caravan (E24)
- 2001.04-2007.08 Nissan Caravan (E25)
- 1999.06-2002.08 Nissan Datsun Truck (D22)

== KA24 ==
=== KA24E ===
The KA24E was a SOHC 12-valve engine produced from July 1988 through January 1997. It uses Hitachi sequential electronic fuel injection, and features cast steel connecting rods, a half-counterweighted cast steel crankshaft, and a cast aluminum cylinder head.

Specifications

- Weight: 371lbs (168kg)
- Bore × Stroke: 89 mm × 96 mm (3.50 in × 3.78 in)
- Max power: 134 hp (100 kW) at 5600 rpm (Navara/Hardbody(D21) 134 hp (100 kW) at 5200 rpm)
- Max torque: 206 N⋅m (152 lb⋅ft) at 4400 rpm (Navara/Hardbody(D21) 209 N⋅m (154 lb⋅ft) at 3600 rpm)
- Valve Configuration: SOHC, 12 valves
- Compression ratio: 8.6:1 (9.1:1 for early 1989 240SX)
- Timing Chain (not Timing Belt a.k.a. Cambelt)

Applications

- 1989–1990 Nissan 240SX
- 1990–1997 Nissan D21 Truck - ("Hardbody")
- 1990-1998 Sunny (B13)
- 1997-1999 D22 Navara (Australia)
- 1990-1995 Nissan Pathfinder
- 1989–1995 Nissan Axxess / Nissan Prairie (not UK except parallel imports for wheelchair conversions post 1991)
- 1999-2001 Isuzu Fargo (Rebadged Nissan Caravan)
- 1990–1992 Nissan Stanza (USA-spec)
- 1989–1992 Nissan Pintara / Ford Corsair
- 1993-1996 Nissan Terrano II Europe

=== KA24DE ===
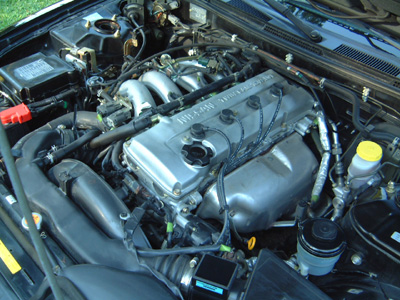
KA24DE Engine in an S14 240SX

The 2.4 L (2,389 cc) KA24DE was used in many Nissan cars and trucks. Most KA24DEs bound for the US were built in the city of Aguascalientes, Mexico, with the exceptions of the 240SX, 1994-97 Altima (re-badged Bluebird SSS), and the U13 Bluebird released in Australia with FWD configuration, which were manufactured in Yokohama, Kanagawa, Japan. The KA24DE is very similar to the KA24E. The KA24E is SOHC with three valves per cylinder actuated by rocker arms, and the KA24DE is DOHC with 4 valves per cylinder and shim-over-bucket valve actuation. Design improvements of the dual cam engine include the use of a knock sensor, larger diameter girdled main bearings in the Japanese block, different oil pan (not interchangeable between Japanese and Mexican blocks), different oil pickup (front pickup on Japanese block and side on Mexican block), dipstick location (toward the rear of block on Mexican and mid block on Japanese) and piston oil squirters. In addition to the increased power and torque, the KA24DE has a higher redline than the KA24E.

KA24DE-A is an Altima specific model of the KA24DE. The head and block are non-interchangeable between all other models and are uniquely cast for front wheel drive operation.

Differences in the Japanese block to Mexican are also present. The Mexico blocks (all DEs except those found in the S series) implemented a distributor and oil pump drive similar to the L series; from the crank nose. They also used a single row chain for the upper timing assembly without valve cover mounted guide. In addition to this, they removed the rearmost cam journal in the Mexico head. The crank rides on individually capped bearings with a slightly smaller diameter than the Japanese block, with shorter, slightly lower compression pistons in cylinders that have thicker walls than the Japanese DE. They retained the knock sensor and piston oilers.

Specifications

- Bore × Stroke: 89 mm × 96 mm (3.50 in × 3.78 in)
- Displacement: 2,389 cc (2.4 L; 145.8 cu in)
- Max. power: 155 bhp (157 PS; 116 kW) at 5,600 rpm (Navara/Frontier (D22) 110 kW (148 hp) at 5600 rpm) (Xterra engine: 143 bhp (107 kW) at 5200 rpm)
- Max. torque: 160 lb⋅ft (217 N⋅m) at 4,400 rpm (Navara/Frontier (D22) 208 N⋅m (153 lb⋅ft) at 3600 rpm) 154 lb⋅ft (209 N⋅m) at 4000 RPM (2000-2004 Nissan Xterra).
- Valvetrain configuration: DOHC, 4 valves per cylinder
- Compression ratio: 9.5:1 (240SX 91-98), 9.2:1 (Navara/Frontier (D22), Xterra)
- Timing Chain

Applications

KA24DE

- 2000-2004 Nissan Xterra
- 1998-2016 Nissan Navara/Frontier (D22)
- 1991-1998 Nissan 240SX
- 1997-2000 Nissan R'nessa (4WD model, Japan)
- 1998-2001 Nissan Presage U30 (Japan)
- 1999-2001 Nissan Bassara U30 (Japan)
- 1993-1997 Nissan Bluebird U13
- Isuzu COMO (Japanese: Isuzu COMO)
- Nissan Largo

KA24DE-A

- 1993-1999 Nissan Altima [150 hp (112 kW) - Max torque 154 lb⋅ft (209 N⋅m). Compression ratio: 9.5:1]
- 2000-2001 Nissan Altima [Change hp & Torque]

== See also ==
- List of Nissan engines
