= Nissan YD engine =

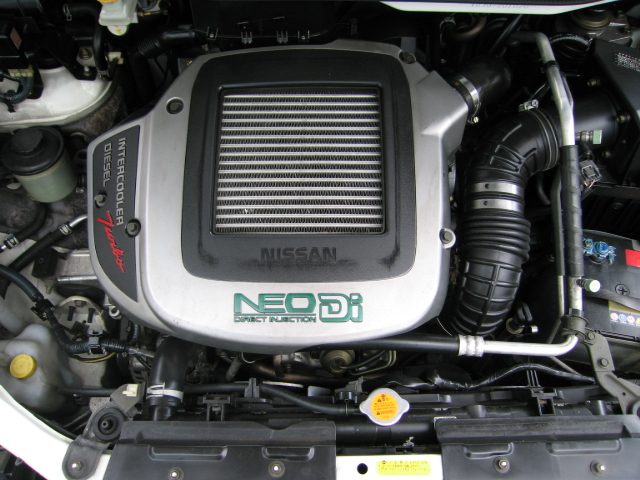
- YD25DDTi in 1998 Nissan Presage

Overview
- Manufacturer: Nissan

Layout
- Configuration: Inline-4
- Displacement: 2.2–2.5 L (2,184–2,488 cc)
- Cylinder bore: 86 mm (3.4 in); 89 mm (3.5 in)
- Piston stroke: 94 mm (3.7 in); 100 mm (3.9 in)
- Cylinder block material: Cast-iron
- Cylinder head material: Aluminium
- Valvetrain: DOHC
- Compression ratio: 15.0:1-18.0:1

Combustion
- Turbocharger: Garrett GT1749V or IHI RHF4 Variable geometry with intercooler (on some versions)
- Fuel system: Electronic rotary injection Common rail direct injection (since 2001)
- Fuel type: Diesel
- Cooling system: Water-cooled

Output
- Power output: 79–190 PS (58–140 kW; 78–187 hp)
- Torque output: 16–45.9 kg⋅m (157–450 N⋅m; 116–332 lb⋅ft)

The YD engine is a 2.2 and 2.5 L (2,184 and 2,488 cc) inline-four diesel engine from Nissan. It has a cast-iron block and aluminium head with chain driven twin overhead camshafts. The engine shares much of its architecture with the QR petrol engine.

== YD22 ==
=== YD22DD ===
Winner of the FY 1998 Sho-Ene Taisho (The Energy Conservation Prize), this engine was marketed as the NEO Di. The YD22DD is used in the Y11 Nissan AD Van and the Nissan Expert (VEW11). It is a naturally aspirated engine, utilising the VP44 electronic controlled rotary injection pump.

=== YD22DDT (VP44 pump) ===
The YD22DDT is used in the X-Trail, N16 Almera. It features the VP44 electronic rotary injection system and wastegated turbochargers. The VP44 pump models are easily spotted due to a flat acoustic cover over the engine.

=== YD22DDTi (common rail) ===
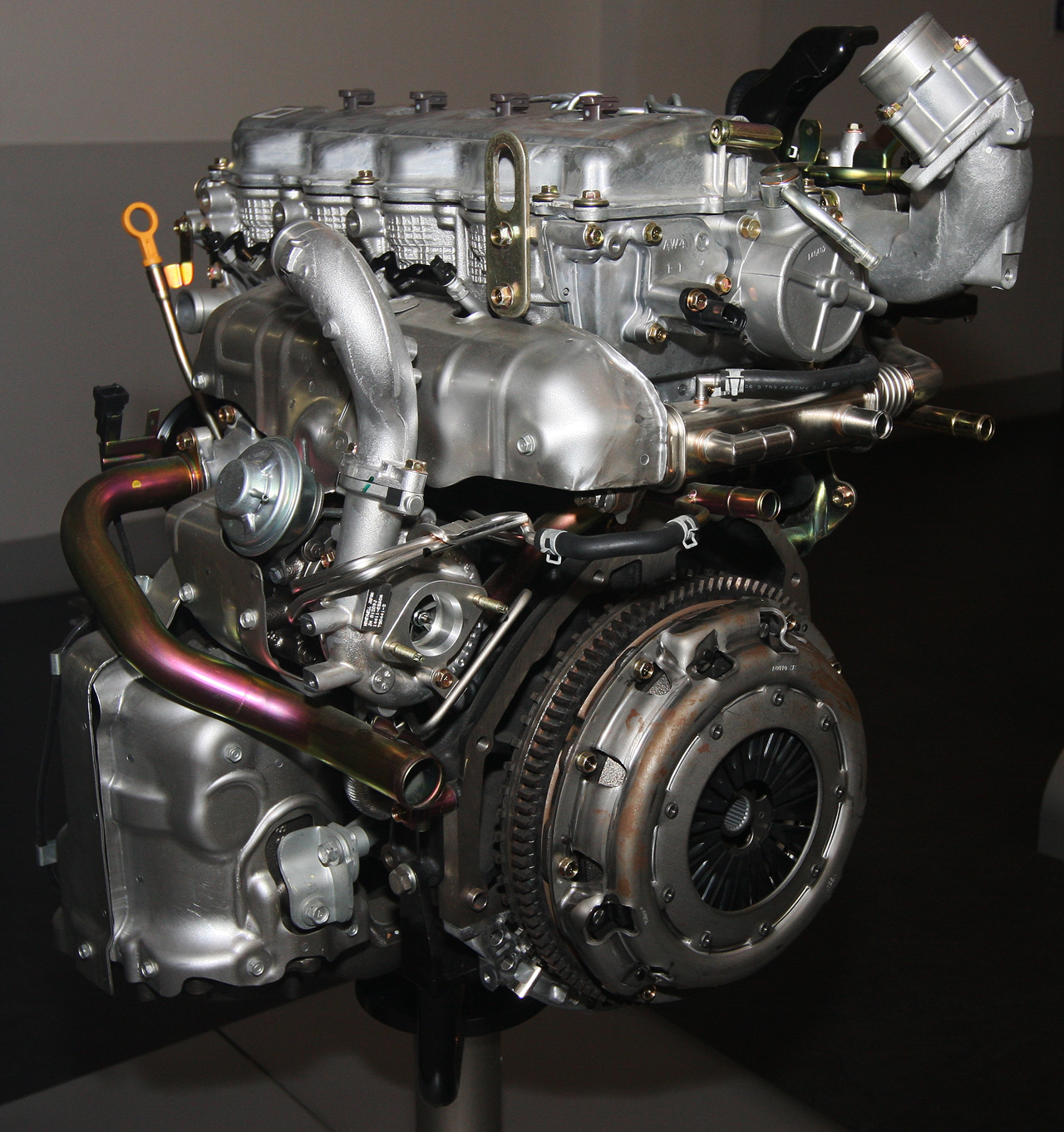
YD22DDTi (Common Rail)

The YD22DDTi was a common rail diesel introduced in 2001, during the first small facelift of the P12 Primera, N16 Almera and V10 Almera Tino. It is also fitted to the Nissan X-trail. The injection system is common rail with a variable vane turbocharger is intercooled and produces the most power and torque of all the YD22 engines. Cars with this common rail engine usually carry the DDTI badge. The common rail version is easily distinguished from the VP44 model by the four injector bumps on the top of the acoustic cover.

Non intercooled versions of this engine were also available with a lower power rating.

== YD25 ==
=== YD25DDTi (VP44 Pump) ===
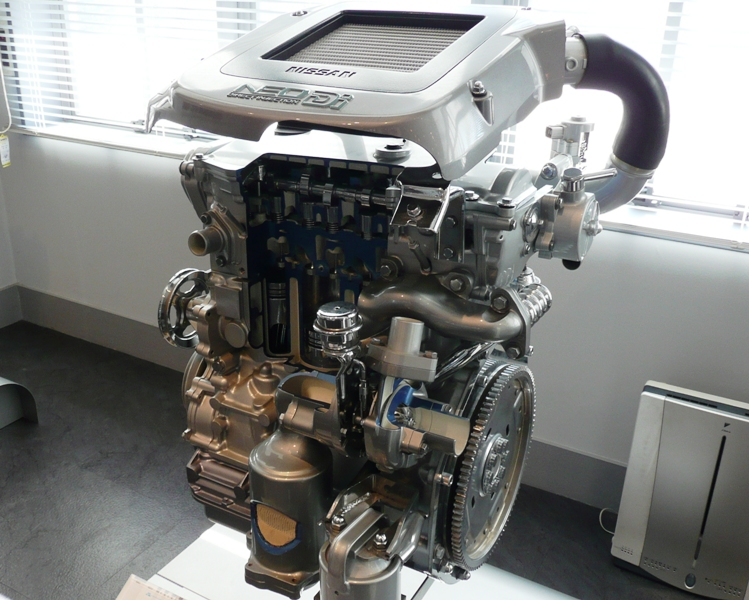
YD25DDTi (VP44)

This engine features the VP44 rotary injection pump and is turbocharged and intercooled. In the Presage/Bassara it is fitted sideways with a variable vane turbocharger (Garrett GT1749V) and torque is limited to approximately 28.6 kg⋅m (280 N⋅m; 207 lb⋅ft) to accommodate the 4 speed automatic gearbox attached.

In the D22 Navara/Kingcab/Frontier the engine is essentially the same other than modifications to accessories, mounts and plumbing to accommodate the longitudinal engine layout. The turbo is a wastegated IHI RHF4 which is also intercooled. The stronger gearbox allows it to produce more torque than the Presage/Bassara version.

Nissan also produced a version tuned for less power, better economy, and cleaner emissions. Intended specifically for commercial vehicles it was introduced in 2012 for the NV350 Caravan and replaced the earlier, 3-litre ZD30DDTi engine. Still using a revised variable geometry turbocharger, it also features an EGR cooler to lower NO_{X}, with a bypass valve to avoid increasing hydrocarbon emissions before the engine reaches operating temperature, and a cylinder head optimized per Nissan's MK (Modulated Kinetics) combustion method.

Applications

- 1998–2001 Nissan Presage
- 1998–2001 Nissan Bassara
- Nissan D22 pickup (Navara / Kingcab / Frontier)
- Nissan D40 pickup (Navara) (106 and 128 kW (144 and 174 PS))
- 2004–present Nissan Frontier
- 2012-2021 Nissan NV350 Caravan (E26)
  - 2026–present Mitsubishi Versa Van

=== YD25DDTi High Power ("DCi") ===
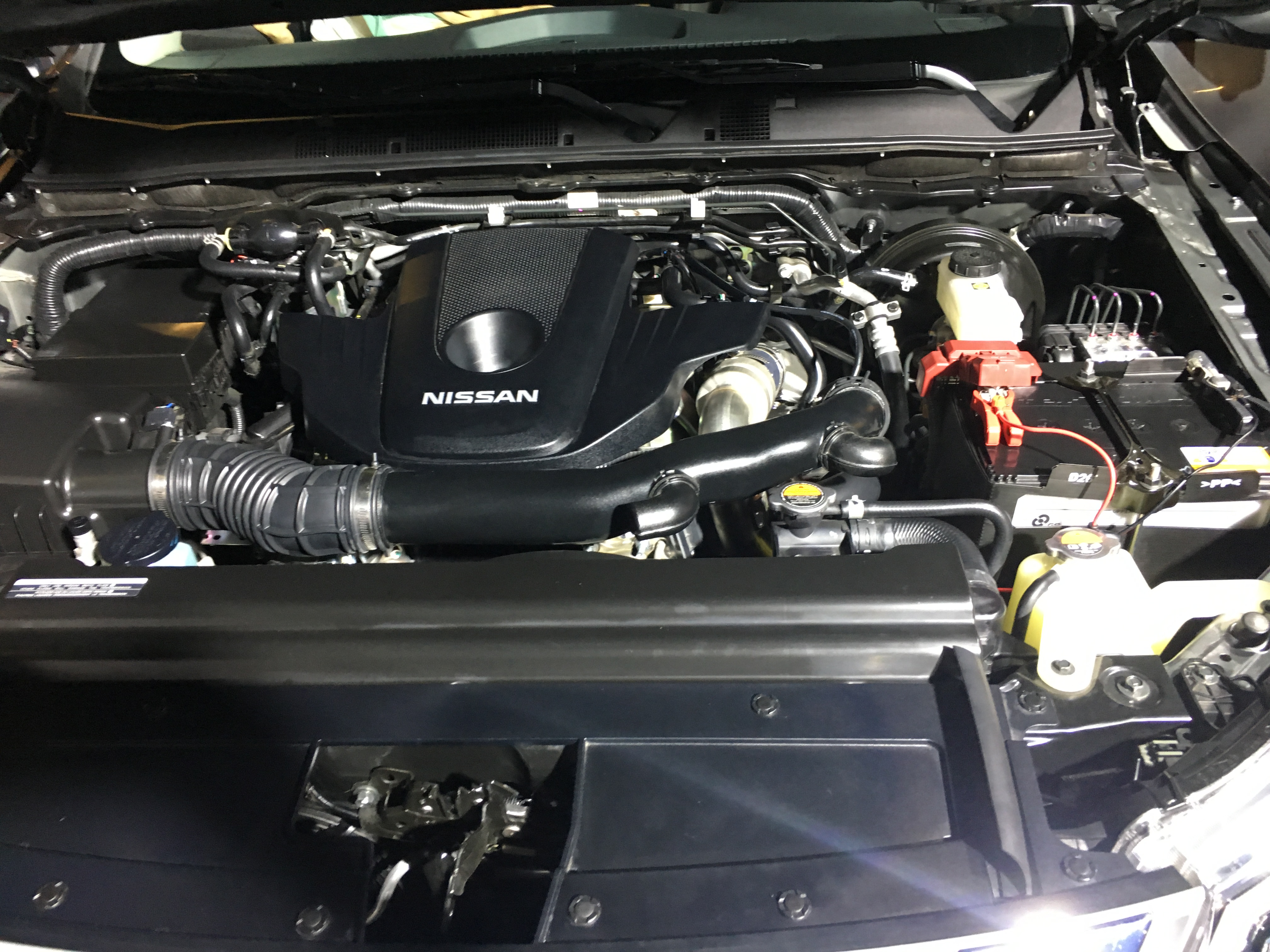
YD25DDTi High Power

The model description YD25DDTi technically refers to the YD25 engines which use the VP44 rotary electronic injection pump and run injection lines to each cylinder. It is equipped with a variable geometry turbocharger (Garrett GT2056V). The common rail versions of this engine are referred to in Europe as DCi. The common rail engines are used in the D40 Navara, late model D22 Navara and the R51 Pathfinder.

YD25DDTi High Power was developed in 2005 for the Nissan Navara (D40) and the Nissan Pathfinder (R51). It initially produced 128 kW (174 PS; 172 hp) at 4,000 rpm and 41.1 kg⋅m (403 N⋅m; 297 lb⋅ft) of torque. In 2010, Nissan updated the engine and the turbo (BV45 from GT2056V) for the D40 Navara and facelifted R51 Pathfinder to produce 140 kW (190 PS; 188 hp) and 45.9 kg⋅m (450 N⋅m; 332 lb⋅ft) of torque. In 2011 the Nissan Murano was fitted with the updated engine.

Applications

- 2006–2014 Nissan Navara (D40)
- 2005–2012 Nissan Pathfinder (R51)
- 2011–2014 Nissan Murano
- 2015–present Nissan NP300 Navara (D23)
- 2018–present Nissan Terra (D23)

== Engine reference ==
The YD engine is manufactured in the following versions:

Code	Vehicle	Year	Displacement	Bore x Stroke	C.R.	Max. Power	Max. Torque	Features
YD22DD	Nissan AD Van (EY11); Nissan Expert (EW11)	2000–2002; 1999–2004	2.2 L (2,184 cc)	86 mm × 94 mm (3.39 in × 3.70 in)	18.0:1	58 kW (79 PS; 78 hp) at 4000 rpm	157 N⋅m (116 lb⋅ft) at 2000 rpm	direct injection 16 valve, no turbo
YD22DDT	Nissan Almera (N16)	2000–2002	2.2 L (2,184 cc)	86 mm × 94 mm (3.39 in × 3.70 in)	18.0:1	81 kW (110 PS; 108 hp) at 4000 rpm	237 N⋅m (175 lb⋅ft) at 2000 rpm	direct injection
YD22DTi	Nissan X-Trail (ET30)	2001–2003	2.2 L (2,184 cc)	86 mm × 94 mm (3.39 in × 3.70 in)	18.0:1	84 kW (114 PS; 112 hp) at 4000 rpm	247 N⋅m (182 lb⋅ft) at 2000 rpm	common rail direct injection intercooler
YD22DDTi	Nissan X-Trail (ET30)	2003–2007	2.2 L (2,184 cc)	86 mm × 94 mm (3.39 in × 3.70 in)	16.7:1	100 kW (136 PS; 134 hp) at 4000 rpm	304 N⋅m (224 lb⋅ft) at 2000 rpm	common rail direct injection variable geometry turbo intercooler
YD22DDTi	Nissan Almera (N16); Nissan Almera Tino (V16)	2003–2005	2.2 L (2,184 cc)	86 mm × 94 mm (3.39 in × 3.70 in)	16.7:1	82 kW (112 PS; 110 hp) at 4000 rpm 100 kW (136 PS; 134 hp) at 4000 rpm	247 N⋅m (182 lb⋅ft) at 2000 rpm 304 N⋅m (224 lb⋅ft) at 2000 rpm	common rail direct injection variable geometry turbo intercooler
YD22DDTi	Nissan Primera (P12); Nissan Almera (N16)	2003–2005	2.2 L (2,184 cc)	86 mm × 94 mm (3.39 in × 3.70 in)	16.7:1	102 kW (139 PS; 137 hp) at 4000 rpm	314 N⋅m (231 lb⋅ft) at 2000 rpm	common rail direct injection variable geometry turbo intercooler
YD25DDT	Nissan Navara/Frontier (D22)	2001–present	2.5 L (2,488 cc)	89 mm × 100 mm (3.50 in × 3.94 in)	18.0:1	80 kW (109 PS; 108 hp) at 4000 rpm	260 N⋅m (192 lb⋅ft) at 2000 rpm	M-fire direct injection turbo
YD25DDTi	Nissan Navara/Frontier (D22)	2001–present	2.5 L (2,488 cc)	89 mm × 100 mm (3.50 in × 3.94 in)	18.0:1	98 kW (133 PS; 131 hp) at 4000 rpm	304 N⋅m (224 lb⋅ft) at 2000 rpm	common rail direct injection turbo intercooler
YD25DDTi High Power	Nissan Pathfinder (R51); Nissan Navara (D40)	2005–2009	2.5 L (2,488 cc)	89 mm × 100 mm (3.50 in × 3.94 in)	16.5:1	128 kW (174 PS; 172 hp) at 4000 rpm	423 N⋅m (312 lb⋅ft) at 2000 rpm	common rail direct injection variable geometry turbo intercooler
YD25DDTi High Power	Nissan Pathfinder (R51); Nissan Navara (D40); Nissan Terra (D23)	2010–present	2.5 L (2,488 cc)	89 mm × 100 mm (3.50 in × 3.94 in)	15.0:1	140 kW (190 PS; 187 hp) at 4000 rpm	450 N⋅m (332 lb⋅ft) at 2000 rpm	common rail direct injection variable geometry turbo intercooler
YD25DDTi Mid Power; Common rail	Nissan Navara (D40)	2005–present	2.5 L (2,488 cc)	89 mm × 100 mm (3.50 in × 3.94 in)	16.5:1	106 kW (144 PS; 142 hp) at 4000 rpm	356 N⋅m (263 lb⋅ft) at 2000 rpm	common rail direct injection variable geometry turbo intercooler
YD25DDTi NEO Di	Nissan Presage/Bassara (U30)	1998–2001	2.5 L (2,488 cc)	89 mm × 100 mm (3.50 in × 3.94 in)	17.5:1	110 kW (150 PS; 148 hp) at 4000 rpm	279 N⋅m (206 lb⋅ft) at 1800 rpm	common rail direct injection variable geometry turbo intercooler

== See also ==
- Nissan engines
