= Nissan R'nessa =

Crossover station wagon produced by Nissan (1997-2001)

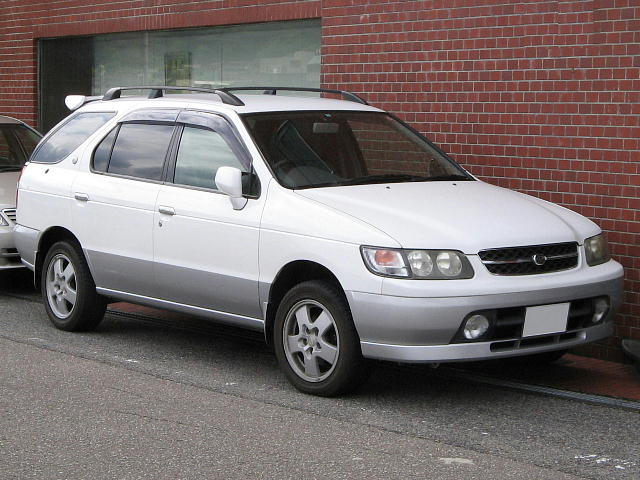

Overview
- Manufacturer: Nissan
- Model code: N30
- Also called: Nissan Altra (electric)
- Production: 1997–2001
- Assembly: Japan: Kaminokawa, Tochigi (Tochigi plant)

Body and chassis
- Body style: 5-door station wagon/crossover SUV
- Layout: Front-engine, front-wheel-drive or all-wheel-drive
- Related: Nissan Cefiro; Nissan Presage; Nissan Bassara

Powertrain
- Engine: 2.0 L SR20DET turbo I4; 2.0 L SR20DE I4; 2.4 L KA24DE I4
- Transmission: Hyper CVT; 4-speed automatic (E-ATX); 4-speed automatic (E-AT)

Dimensions
- Wheelbase: 2,800 mm (110.2 in)
- Length: 4,680 mm (184.3 in)
- Width: 1,765 mm (69.5 in)
- Height: 1,690 mm (66.5 in)
- Curb weight: 1,640 kg (3,620 lb)

Chronology
- Successor: Nissan Murano; Nissan Leaf (for Nissan Altra EV)

The Nissan R'nessa (Japanese: 日産・ルネッサ, Hepburn: Nissan Runessa) is a station wagon manufactured by Nissan Motors from 1997 to 2001. According to Nissan, the name derives from "packaging renaissance for versatile, spacious comfort on wheels."

It was produced by Nissan from October 1997 to July 2001, and competed with the Mitsubishi RVR and the Honda HR-V. Powering the 2WD models was the SR20DE engine, The X and G models with a 4WD specification were fitted with the KA24DE engine. The GT Turbo model came with the SR20DET engine and was AWD. In Japan, it was exclusive to Nissan Satio Store Japanese dealerships.

== Nissan Altra ==
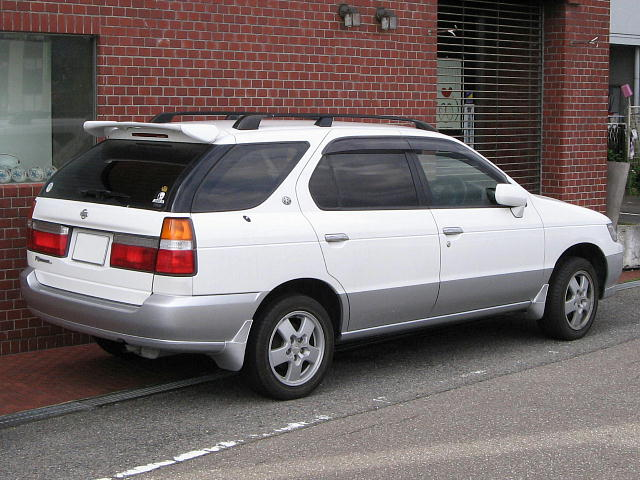
Nissan R'nessa (1997/10-2000/1)

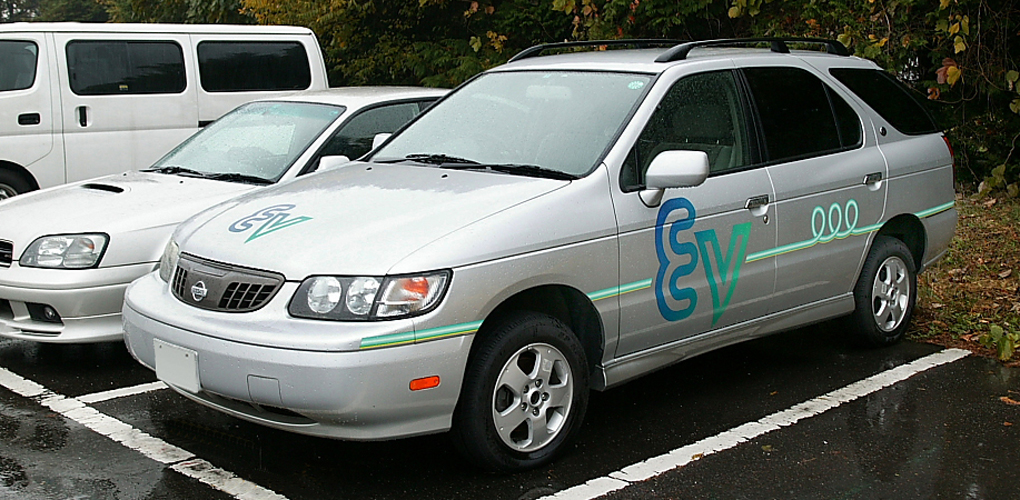
Nissan Altra EV

The Nissan Altra is an electric car based on the R'nessa, produced between 1998 and 2002. It was introduced at the Los Angeles International Auto Show on 29 December 1997. Nissan described the Altra as a combination of a sedan, SUV, and minivan. It was mainly used as a fleet vehicle in California for companies such as electric utilities. Only about 200 vehicles were ever produced.

The Altra was equipped with a neodymium magnet 62 kW electric motor, and ran on lithium ion batteries manufactured by Sony. It had a range of 230 km (140 mi) between a charging interval of 5 hours, and a charge-discharge cycle over 1,000 times. The batteries were installed beneath the floor.

Technologically, the Altra was significant as being the first production electric vehicle to use a lithium-ion battery. Nissan called this a third-generation battery (after lead–acid and nickel–metal hydride) and chose Li-ion primarily for its power density. It was managed by a passive system, ensuring the batteries never reach charge levels outside their recommended zones. The Altra had a permanent magnet synchronous motor, controlled by a 32-bit RISC computer. It had other more typical features, such as keyless entry, power mirrors and windows, a 4-wheel anti-lock braking system, and regenerative braking. According to Nissan, the Altra had a maximum range of 120 miles (190 km). The Environmental Protection Agency reported that the 2000 version had an adjusted mileage (miles per equivalent of a gasoline gallon) of 117 mpg_{‑US} (2.01 L/100 km; 141 mpg_{‑imp}) the city, and 130 mpg_{‑US} (1.8 L/100 km; 160 mpg_{‑imp}) on the highway.
