= Nissan PR engine =

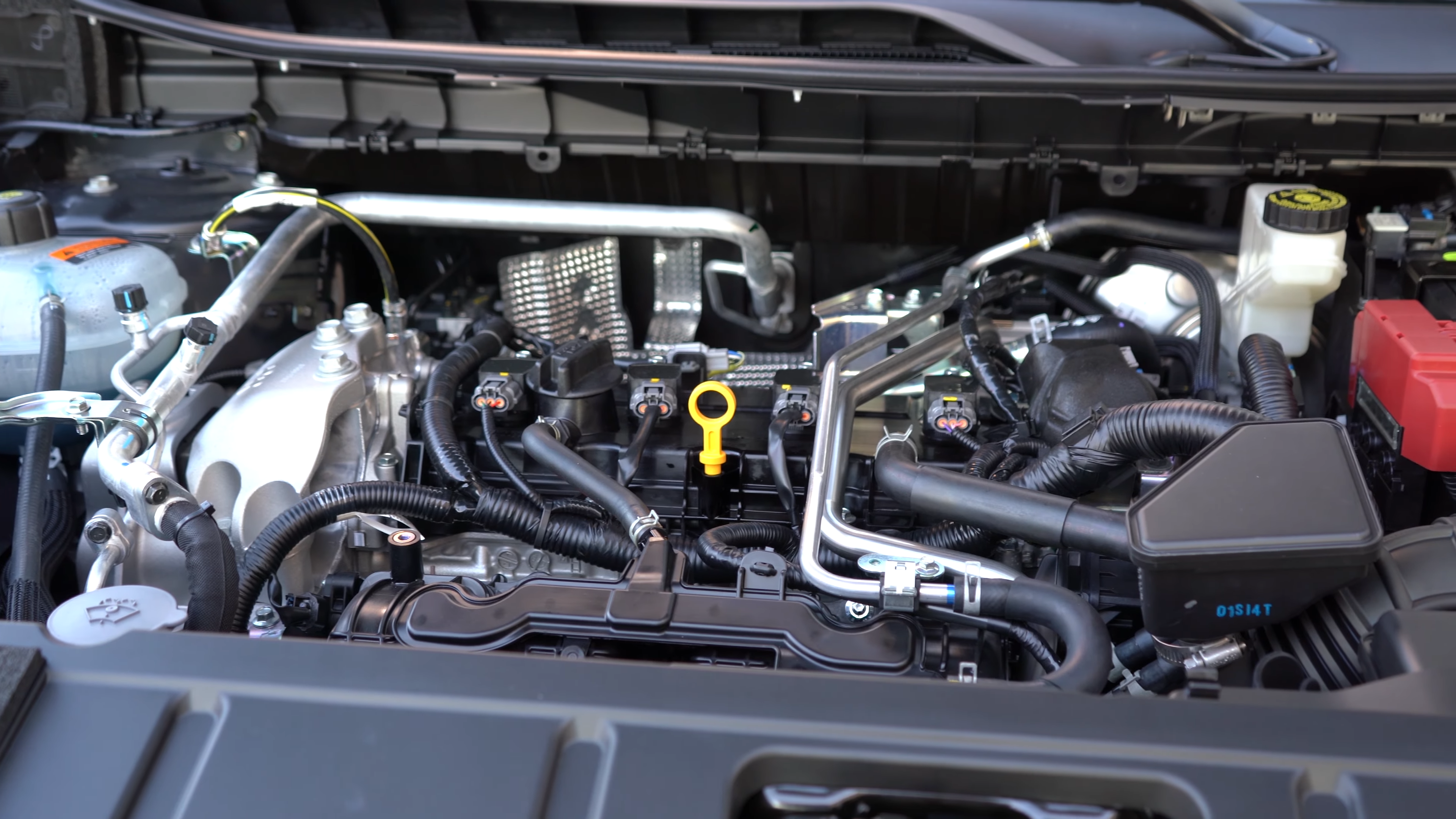

Overview
- Manufacturer: Nissan
- Production: 2018–present

Layout
- Displacement: 2.5 L (2,488 cc)
- Cylinder bore: 89 mm (3.5 in)
- Piston stroke: 100 mm (3.9 in)
- Cylinder block material: Aluminum
- Cylinder head material: Aluminum
- Valvetrain: DOHC 4 valves per cylinder with VVT
- Valvetrain drive system: Chain
- Compression ratio: 12.0:1

RPM range
- Max. engine speed: 6200 rpm

Combustion
- Fuel system: Direct fuel injection
- Fuel type: Gasoline
- Cooling system: Water-cooled

Output
- Power output: 181–188 hp (135–140 kW; 184–191 PS)
- Torque output: 180–181 lb⋅ft (244–245 N⋅m)

Dimensions
- Dry weight: 142 kg (313 lb)

Emissions
- Emissions target standard: Euro 6, SULEV30

Chronology
- Predecessor: Nissan QR engine

The PR engine is a gasoline inline-four piston engine with a displacement of 2.5 L (2,488 cc) that was introduced in 2018 by Nissan. The motor has an aluminum block and head, and has a dual overhead camshaft (DOHC) four-valve design with variable valve timing and direct injection. The engine is heavily based on the QR engine but has 95% different parts.

The engine is used in compact and midsize applications by Nissan and Mitsubishi via the Renault–Nissan–Mitsubishi Alliance.

== PR25DD ==
The 2.5 L (2488 cc) PR25DD has a bore and stroke of 89 mm × 100 mm (3.5 in × 3.9 in) with a compression ratio of 12.0:1. Compared with its predecessor, the QR25DE, it has an increased compression ratio, iron mirror-finish bore coatings instead of cast-iron cylinder liners, and a resin intake port insert to insulate charge air from heat from the cylinder head. It also has electrically actuated variable valve timing, a variable displacement oil pump, integrated exhaust manifold, and cooled EGR. These features were added to increase fuel economy and lower emissions while increasing power output.

It was first introduced in the Nissan Altima, where it produces 188 hp (140 kW; 191 PS) at 6000 rpm and 180 lb⋅ft (244 N⋅m) of torque at 3600 rpm. It was later introduced in the 2021 Nissan Rogue and 2021 Mitsubishi Outlander, where it produces 181 hp (135 kW; 184 PS) at 6000 rpm and 181 lb⋅ft (245 N⋅m) of torque at 3600 rpm.

Vehicle applications:

- 2019–present Nissan Altima
- 2021–2023 Nissan Rogue
- 2021–present Nissan X-trail
- 2022–present Mitsubishi Outlander

== See also ==
- List of Nissan engines
- Nissan QR engine
