= Nissan Bassara =

Nissan Bassara (JU30)
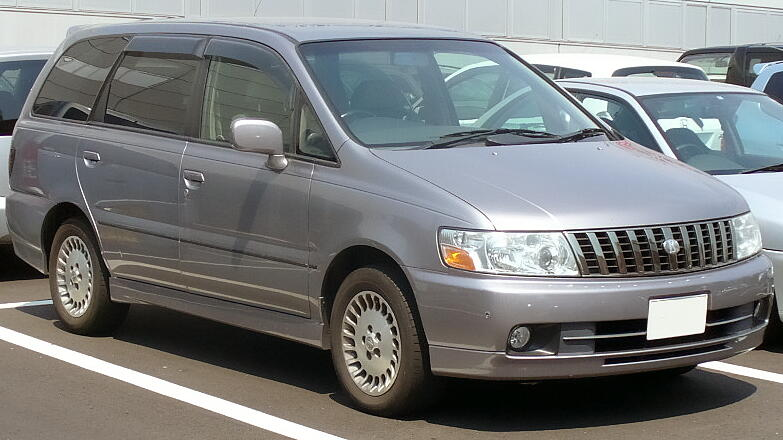

Overview
- Manufacturer: Nissan
- Production: 1999–2003
- Assembly: Nissan Shatai, Hiratsuka, Kanagawa, Japan

Body and chassis
- Class: Minivan
- Body style: 5-door wagon
- Layout: Front-engine, front-wheel-drive Front-engine, four-wheel-drive
- Related: Nissan Presage; Nissan R'nessa

Powertrain
- Engine: 3.0 L VQ30DE V6; 2.5 L YD25DDTi turbo-diesel I4; 2.5 L QR25DE I4; 2.4 L KA24DE I4

Dimensions
- Wheelbase: 2,800 mm (110.2 in)
- Length: 4,795 mm (188.8 in)
- Width: 1,770 mm (69.7 in))
- Height: 1,725 mm (67.9 in)
- Curb weight: 1,620 kg (3,570 lb)

Chronology
- Successor: Nissan Murano; Nissan Elgrand

The Nissan Bassara is a minivan/MPV manufactured from November 1999 to June 2003 by Nissan. The name is derived from the Sanskrit word "Vajara", which means "the prize or object of desire that encourages someone to yield to temptation." The Bassara competed with the Honda Odyssey (Japan-spec) and the Toyota Gaia. It shared a platform with the Nissan Presage and the Nissan R'nessa. The Bassara was exclusive to Japanese Nissan dealerships called Nissan Prince Store locations, and discontinued when Nissan combined their five Japanese dealership networks into two sales chains, and Prince locations were renamed Nissan Red Stage.

A trim level called the Axis was offered with a performance image. Other trim levels were offered called J, J Splendens, Highway Star, V, V touring, X, X Leather Package, Luxury Package X, and the X Touring.

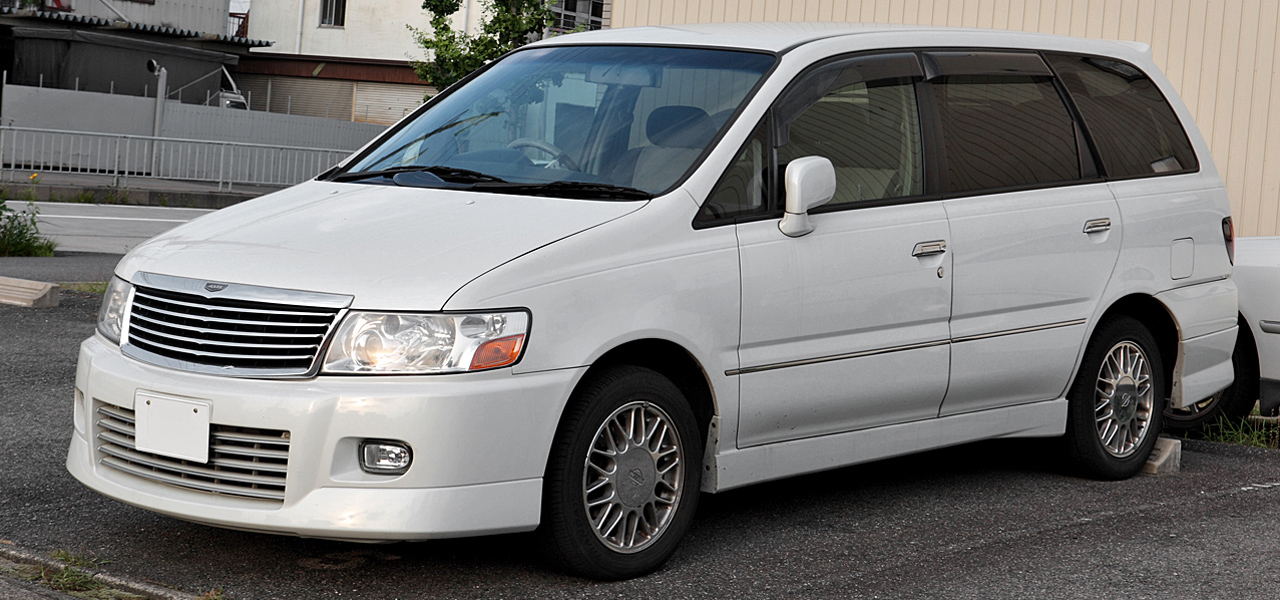
Nissan Bassara Axis

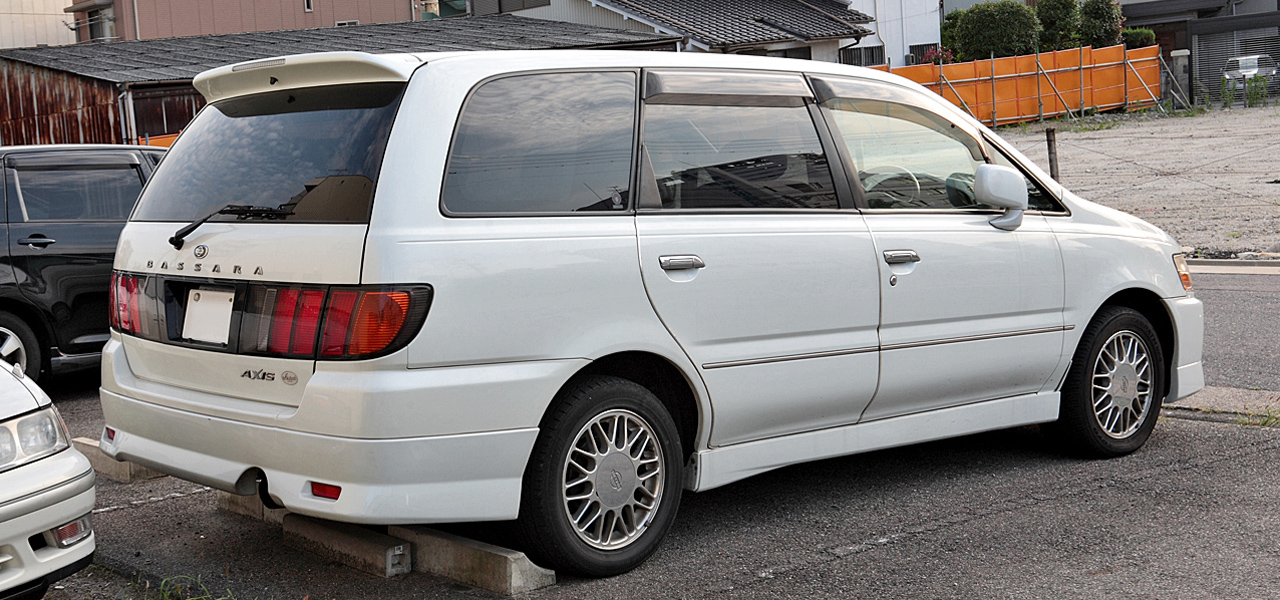
Nissan Bassara Axis
