= Nissan Presage =

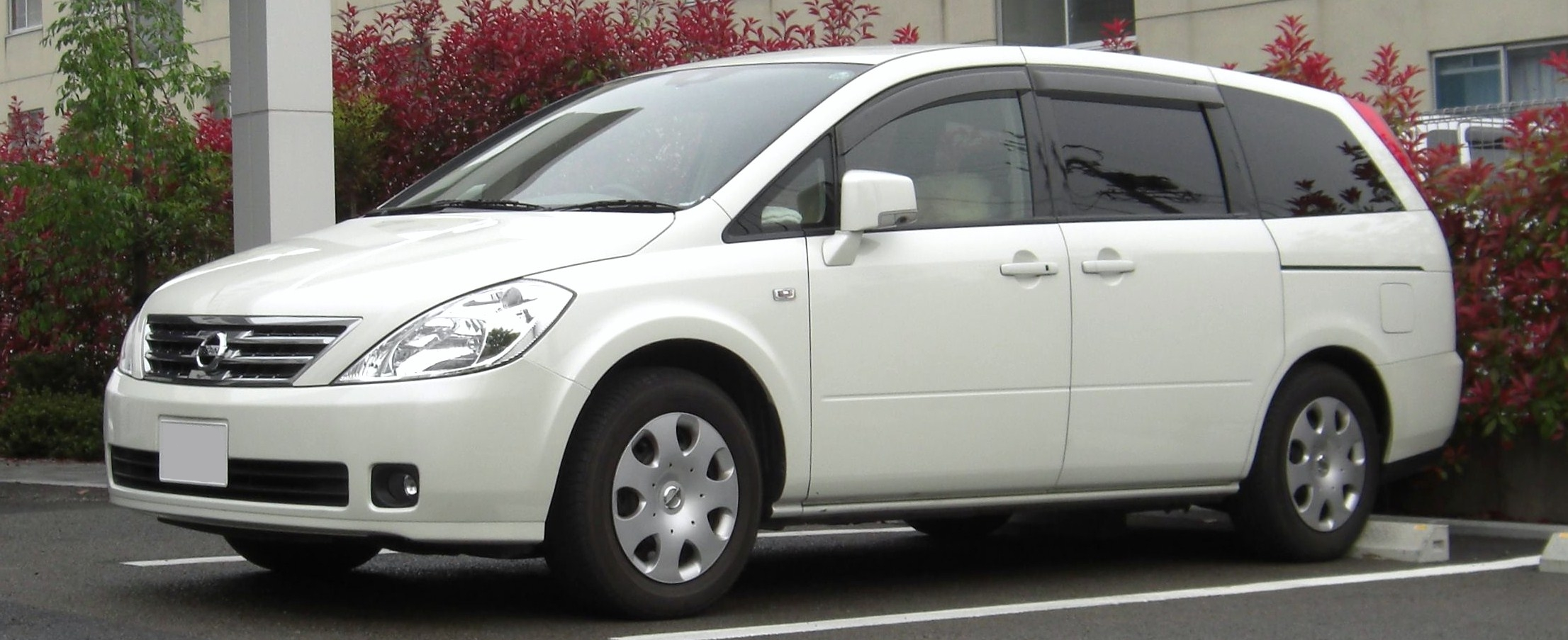

Overview
- Manufacturer: Nissan
- Production: 1998–2009
- Assembly: Japan: Hiratsuka, Kanagawa (Nissan Shatai)

Body and chassis
- Class: Minivan
- Layout: Front-engine, front-wheel-drive or all-wheel-drive

Chronology
- Predecessor: Nissan Bassara (MPV); Nissan Largo (minivan)
- Successor: Nissan Elgrand

The Nissan Presage (Japanese: 日産・プレサージュ, Hepburn: Nissan Puresāju) is a minivan produced by Japanese automaker Nissan from 1998 to 2009. The Presage was only officially sold by Nissan in Japan, Hong Kong and Singapore.

The name "Presage" is French for "omen".

== First generation (U30; 1998) ==
First generation (U30)
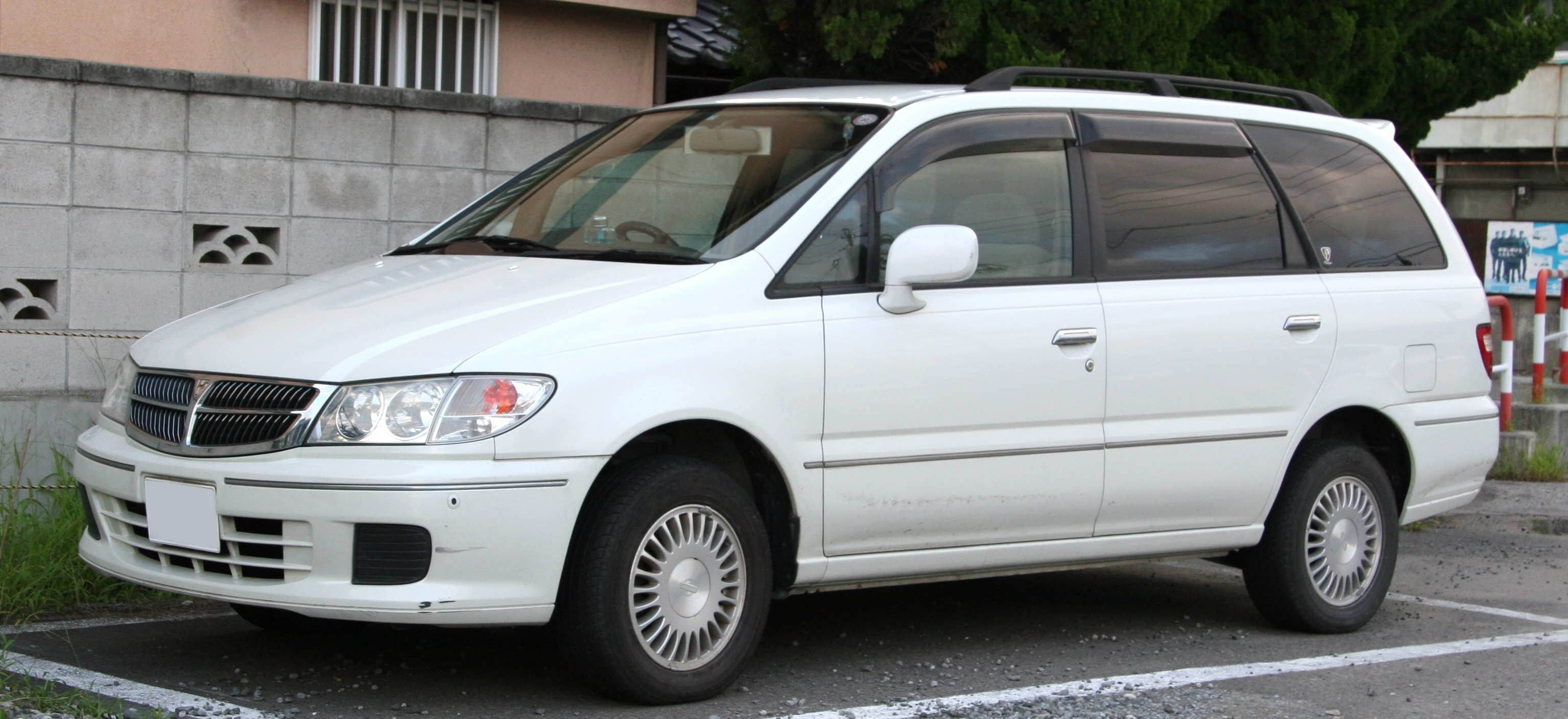
- 1998–2001 Nissan Presage (Japan)

Overview
- Production: 1998–2003

Body and chassis
- Body style: 5-door station wagon
- Related: Nissan R'nessa; Nissan Bassara

Powertrain
- Engine: Petrol: 2.4 L KA24DE I4 (U30); 2.5 L QR25DE I4 (TU30); 3.0 L VQ30DE V6 (HU30); Diesel: 2.5 L YD25DDTi I4 (VU30)
- Transmission: 4-speed automatic

Dimensions
- Wheelbase: 2,800 mm (110.2 in)
- Length: 4,755 mm (187.2 in)
- Width: 1,770 mm (69.7 in)
- Height: 1,725 mm (67.9 in)
- Curb weight: 1,810 kg (3,990 lb)

The first generation Presage was launched by Nissan in June 1998 as a competitor to the Honda Odyssey and Toyota Estima. It was available with either seven or nine seats. The biggest share of components was taken from the Nissan R'nessa, although it also has elements in common with its platform sharing twin, the Nissan Bassara. The Presage was exclusive to Nissan Bluebird Store Japanese dealerships, and a larger companion to the Nissan Prairie.

Engines include a 3.0-litre V6 VQ, and a 2.5-litre four-cylinder YD turbo-diesel engine. The YD turbo-diesel and 2.4-litre KA24DE were discontinued in August 2001 and replaced by a 2.5-litre four-cylinder QR gasoline engine.

All rear seats can be folded, although only those in the second row can be removed. After the restyling in 2001, the Presage got a new trim level called Highway Star.

The 2WD models feature the new Electronic Braking Force Distribution (EBD) system that uses electronic control to optimally distribute braking force to the front and rear wheels according to changes in the payload (number of passengers) being carried. This system works in tandem with the Braking Assist system (a brake booster with a two-stage mechanical assist mechanism plus ABS) to achieve synergies between effective utilization of front and rear braking force (EBD) and reduced pedal pressure (Braking Assist). As a result, more powerful braking performance is obtained with less pedal pressure in emergency braking situations even when carrying a large payload. The 4WD models also provide the nearly same high level of braking performance by adopting a load sensing valve (LSV) as a mechanical braking force distribution system in a set with the Braking Assist system.

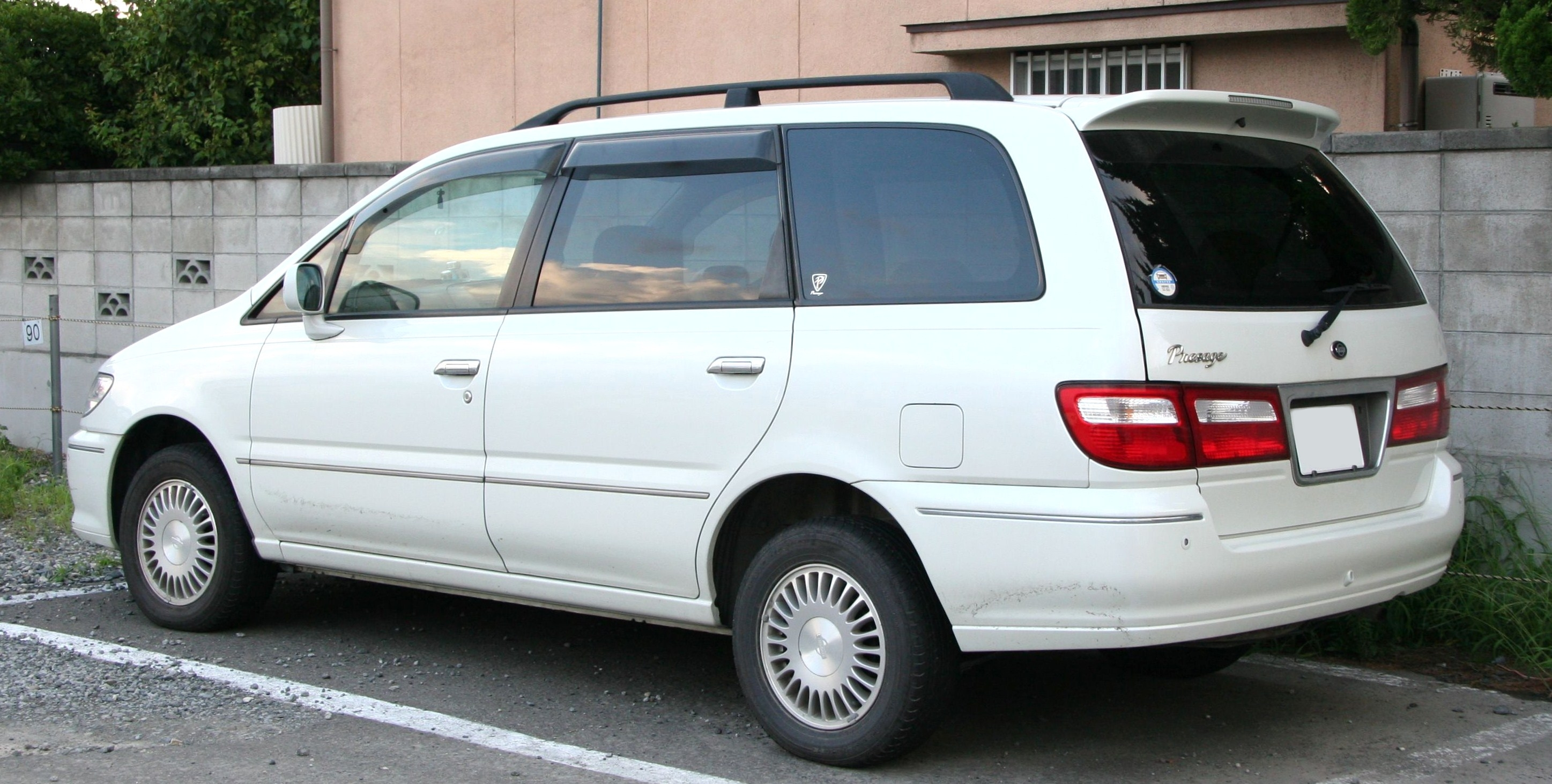
1998–2001 Nissan Presage (Japan)

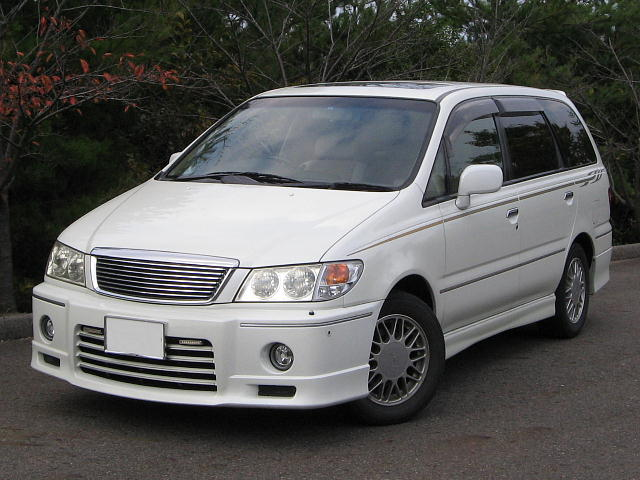
1998–2001 Nissan Presage Axis (Japan)

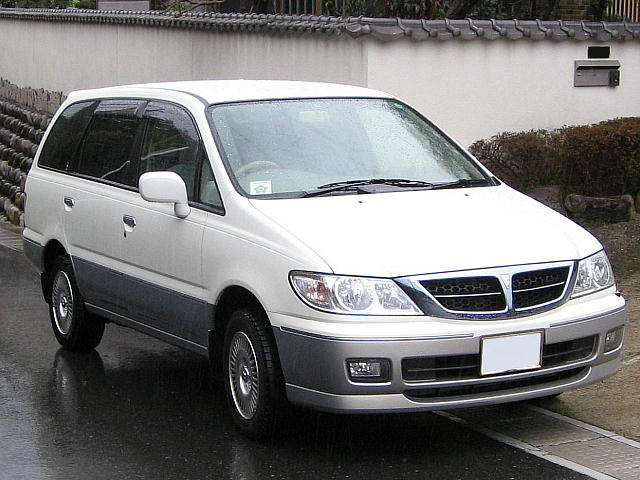
2001–2003 Nissan Presage (Japan)

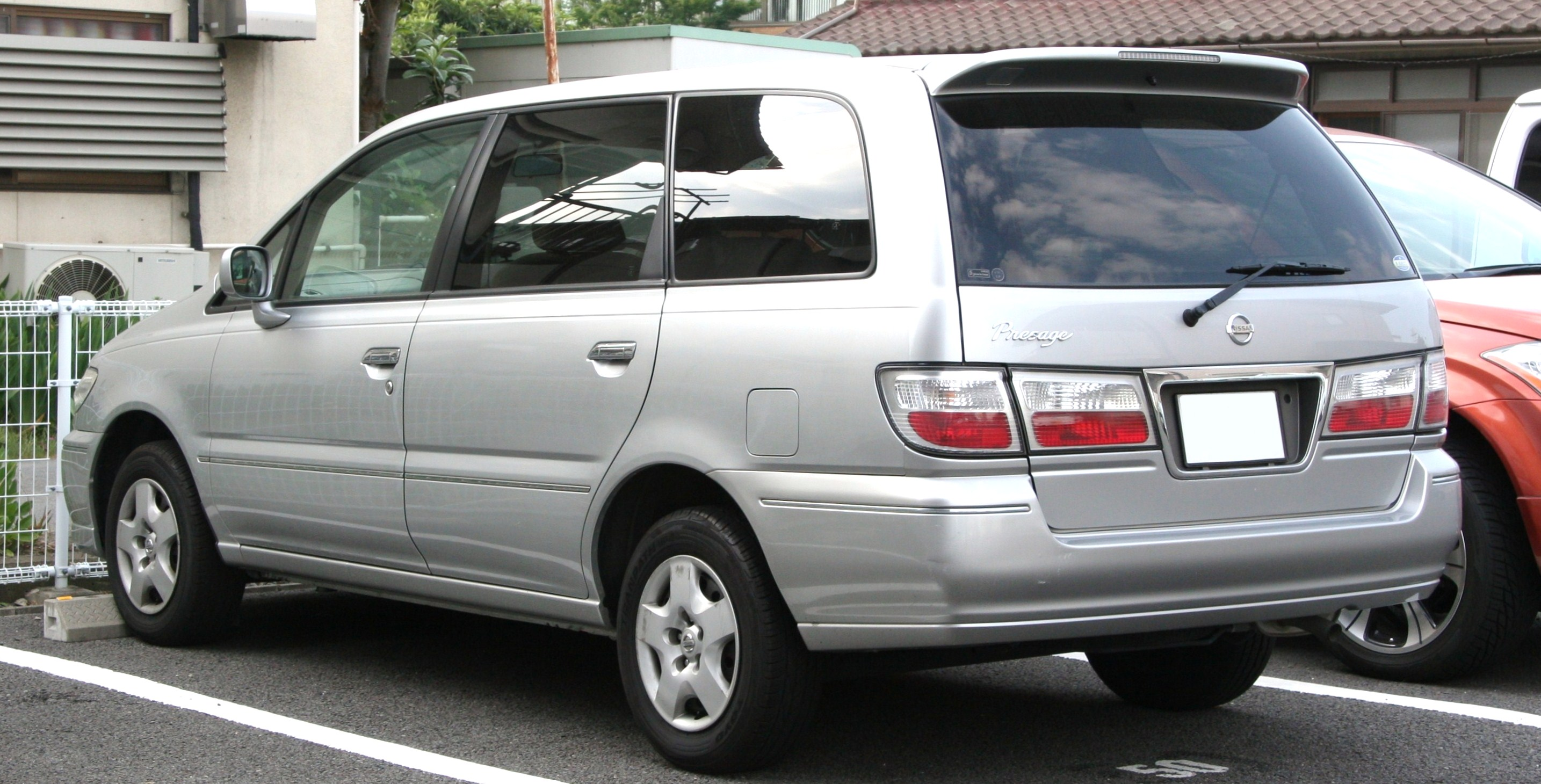
2001–2003 Nissan Presage (Japan)

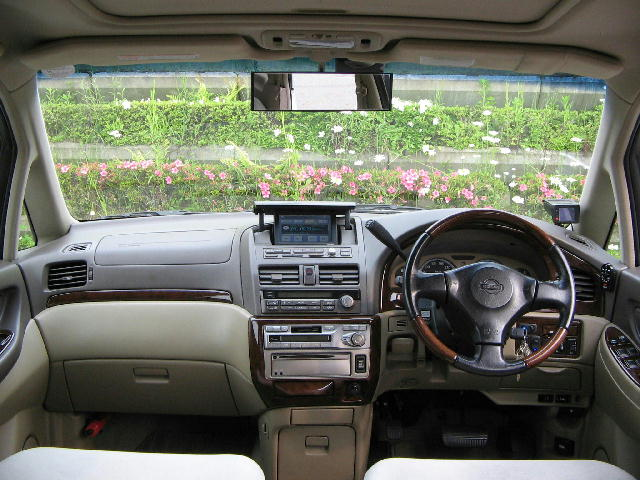
Interior

== Second generation (U31; 2003) ==
Second generation (U31)
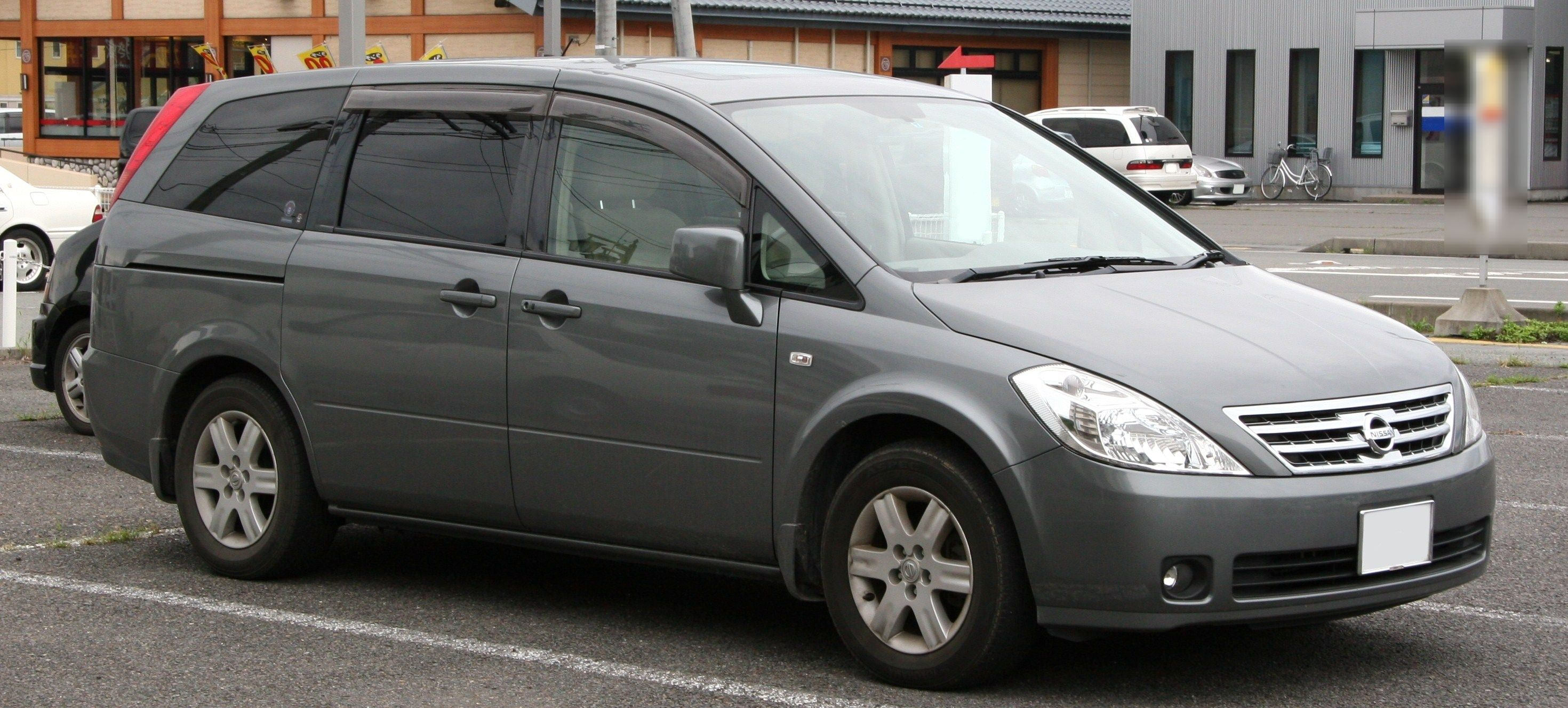
- 2003–2006 Nissan Presage X 3.5

Overview
- Production: 2003–2009

Body and chassis
- Body style: 5-door MPV
- Platform: Nissan FF-L platform

Powertrain
- Engine: Petrol: 2.5 L QR25DE I4; 3.5 L VQ35DE V6
- Transmission: 4-speed automatic (E-ATX); CVT

Dimensions
- Wheelbase: 2,900 mm (114.2 in)
- Length: 4,870 mm (191.7 in)
- Width: 1,825 mm (71.9 in)
- Height: 1,695 mm (66.7 in)
- Curb weight: 1,860 kg (4,100 lb)

The second generation Presage debuted in June 2003 with a transformable seven- or eight-seat configuration. Rear side doors were changed from swinging to sliding. The new Presage is built on the L-class platform, which is also used for the Teana mid-size car, and the North American Nissan Murano.

Engines are also taken from the Teana, a 2.5-litre four-cylinder and a 3.5-litre V6 gasoline engine. These engines are mated with a four-speed automatic transmission or a sequential CVT.

The main advantage of the second generation of this Japanese car is its comfortable and transformable interior. For easier reversing, there is a rear-view camera. As before, a sporty trim level dubbed Highway Star was available. Production ended in 2009 due to poor sales worldwide.

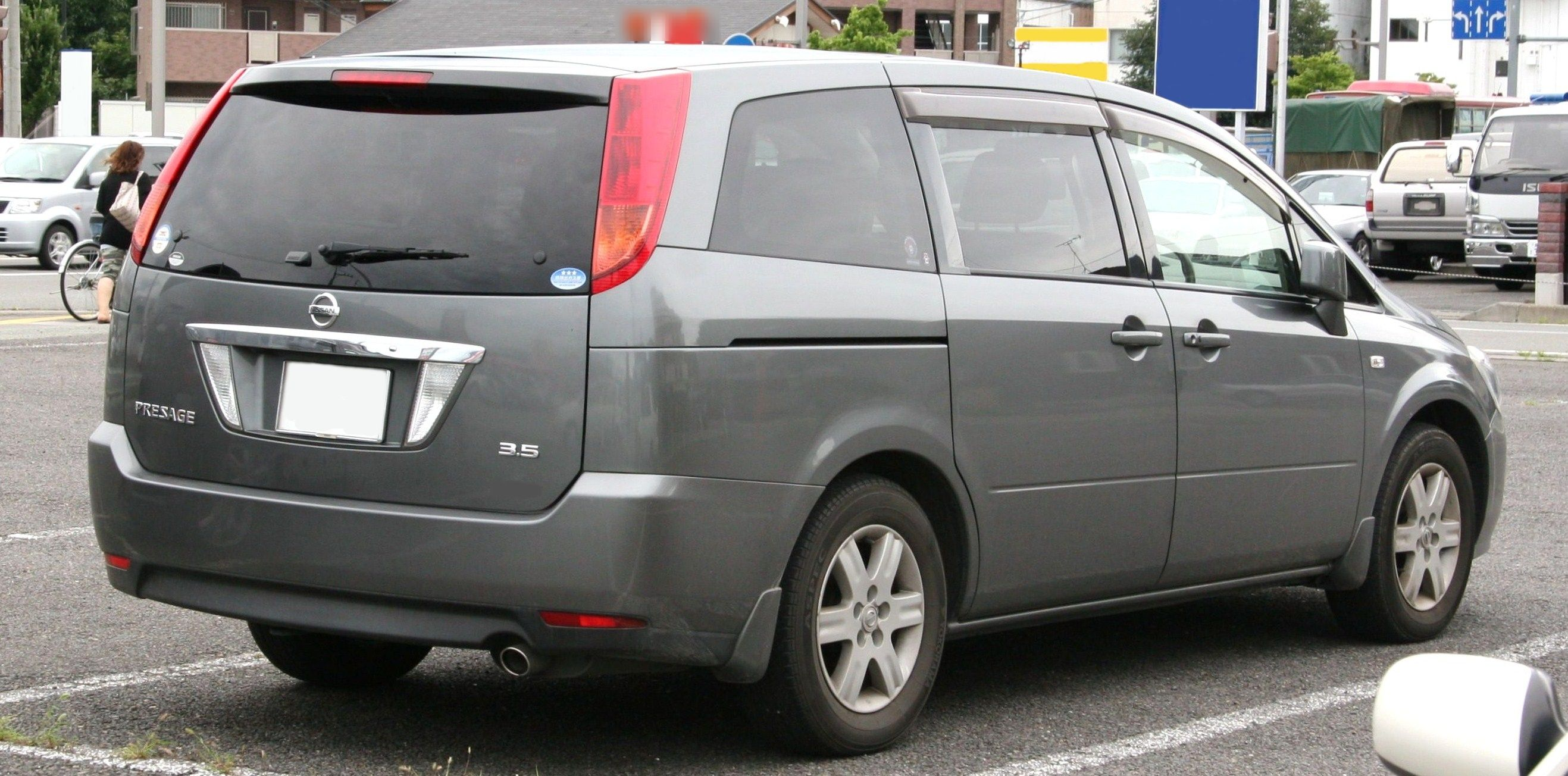
2003–2006 Nissan Presage X 3.5

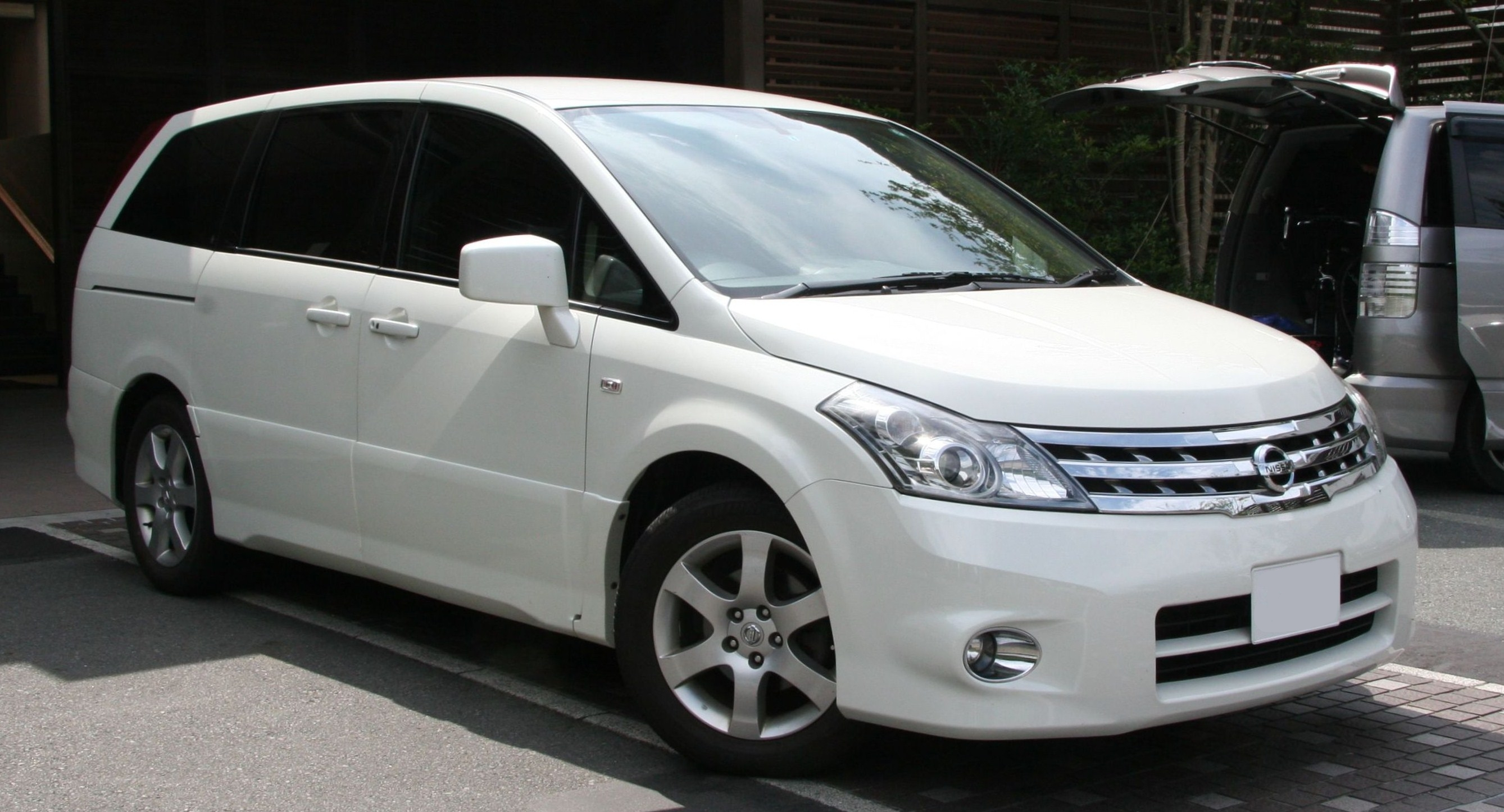
2006–2009 Nissan Presage Highway Star

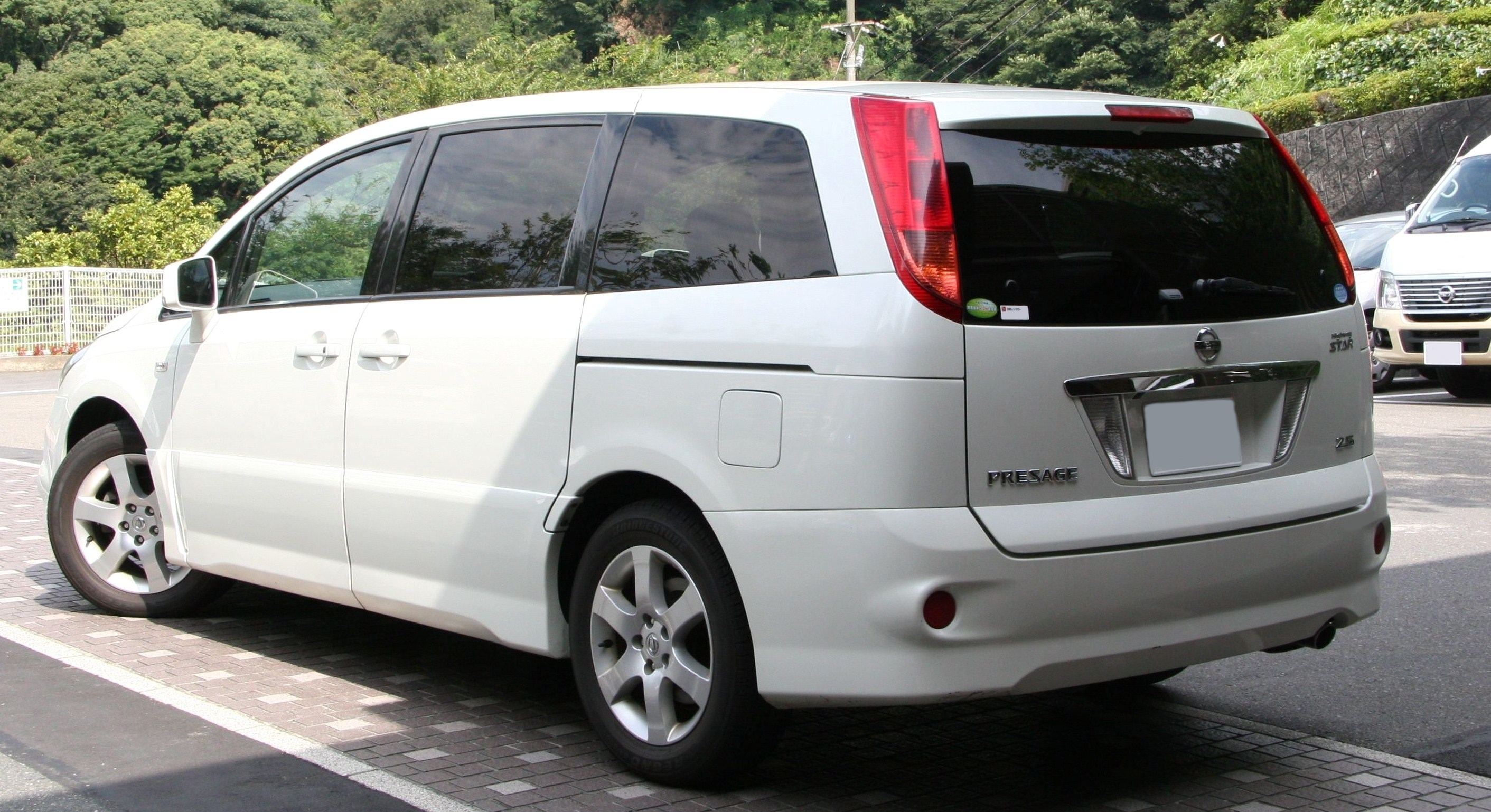
2006–2009 Nissan Presage Highway Star

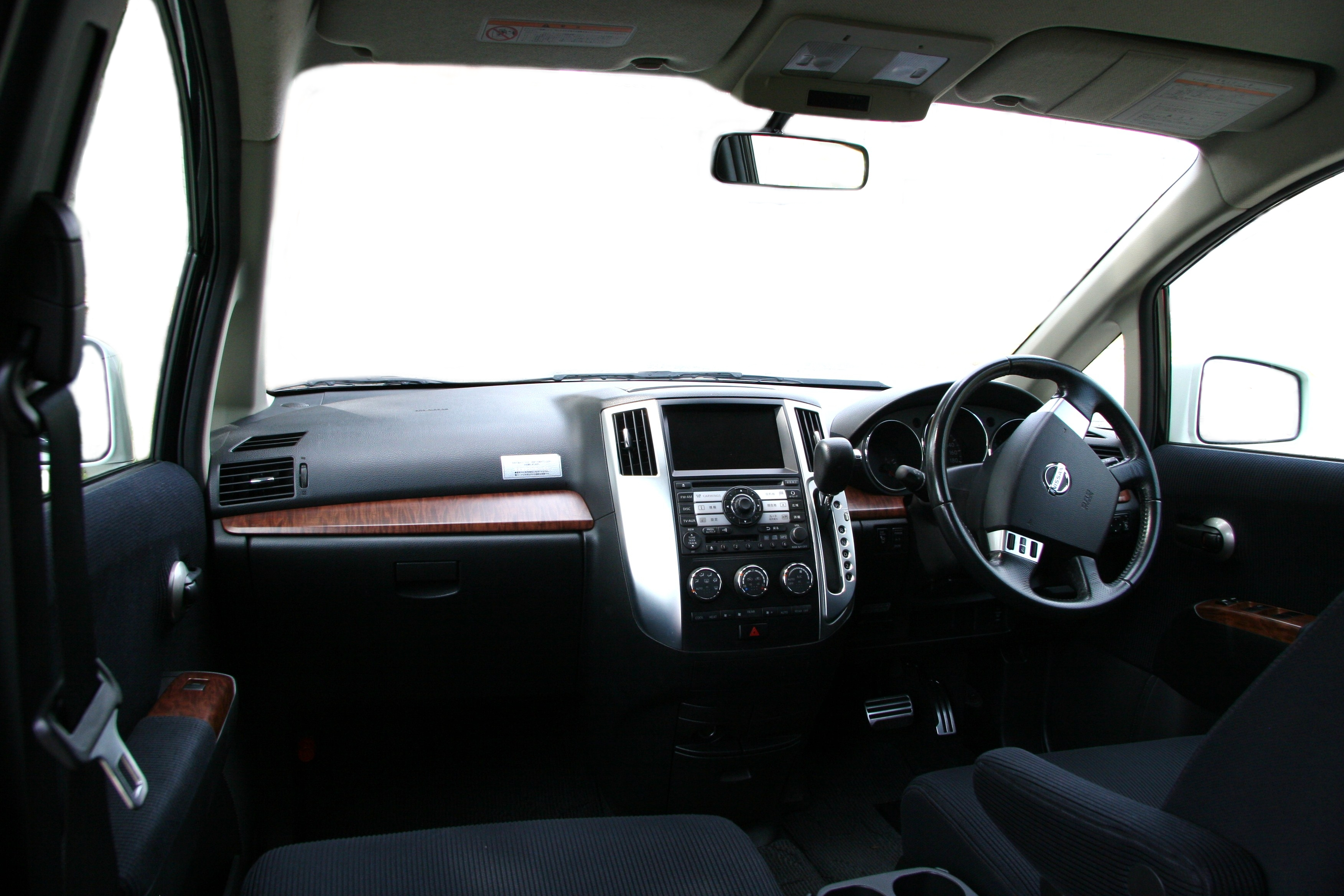
Interior
