= Nissan Almera Tino =

Compact car produced by Nissan, 1998–2006

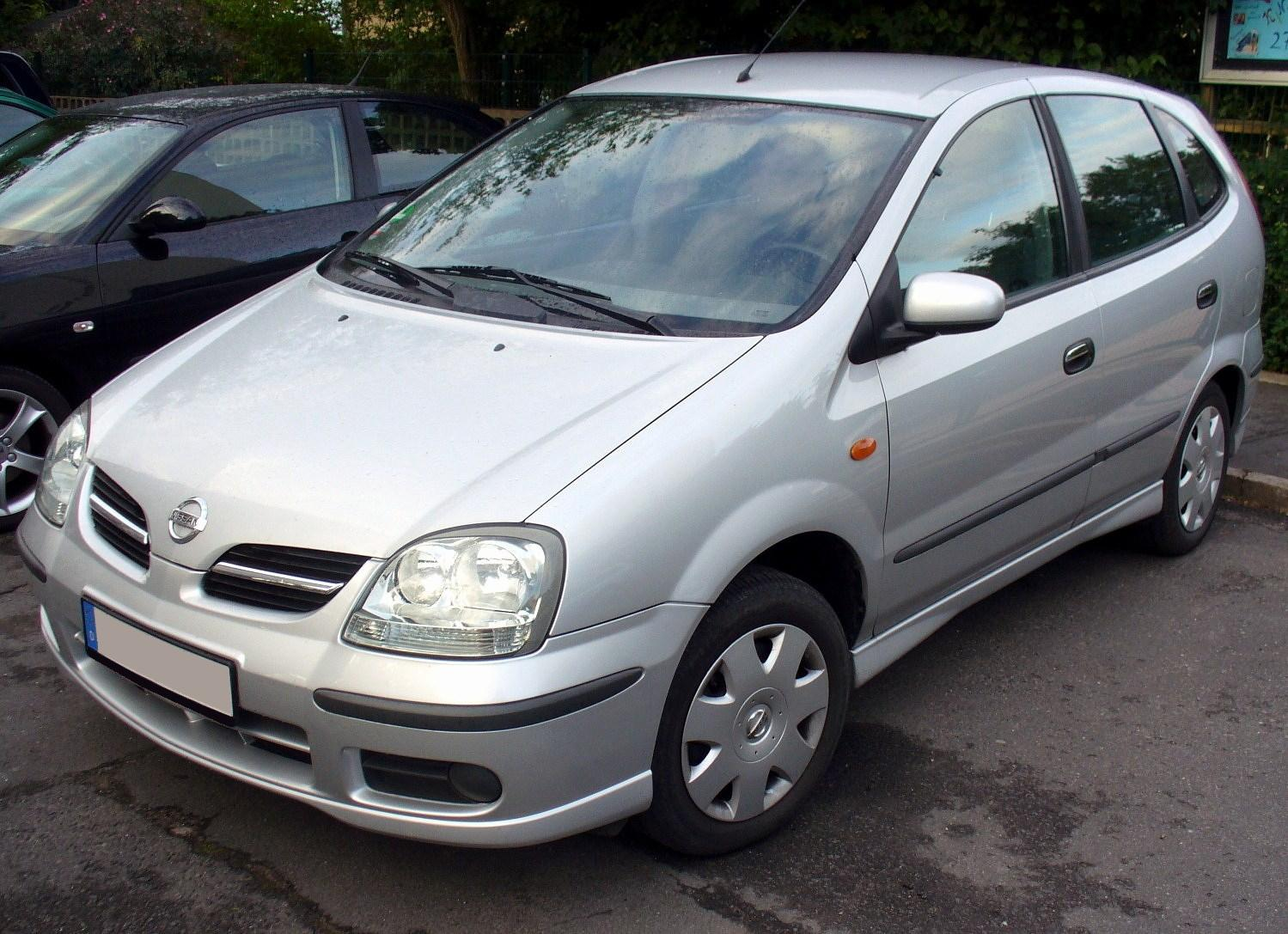
- Facelift Nissan Almera Tino

Overview
- Manufacturer: Nissan
- Model code: V10
- Also called: Nissan Tino (Japan)
- Production: 1998–2006 (Japan); 2000–2006 (Europe)
- Assembly: Kyushu, Japan (JDM (Nissan Tino) models only); Musashimurayama, Tokyo, Japan (Asia models only); Barcelona, Spain (Nissan Motor Ibérica, Europe domestic market models only)

Body and chassis
- Class: Compact MPV
- Body style: 5-door hatchback
- Layout: Front-engine, front-wheel-drive
- Platform: Nissan MS platform
- Related: Nissan Bluebird Sylphy (N16); Nissan Almera (N16)

Powertrain
- Engine: petrol: 1.8 L QG18DE I4; 2.0 L SR20DE I4; diesel: 2.2 L YD22DDT turbo I4; 2.2 L YD22DDTi dCi I4
- Transmission: 5/6-speed manual 4-speed automatic CVT

Dimensions
- Wheelbase: 2,535 mm (99.8 in)
- Length: 4,264 mm (167.9 in)
- Width: 1,758 mm (69.2 in)
- Height: 1,608 mm (63.3 in)
- Curb weight: 1,380–1,525 kg (3,042–3,362 lb)

Chronology
- Successor: Nissan Note

The Nissan Almera Tino is a car which was produced by the Japanese automaker Nissan between 1998 and 2003 in Japan, as the Nissan Tino. Nissan's Spanish factory produced the Almera Tino between 2000 and 2006. It has been described as a mini MPV, a compact people carrier, or an estate car.

== History ==
The Almera Tino was based on floorpan of the Almera small family car (whose second generation went on to launch at the beginning of 2000), and launched in Europe in May of that year, and was sold until the end of 2006, ceasing production in the February of that year - just before the Almera hatchback and saloon were axed. The car was known as simply Tino in Japan, where it was sold from 1998 to 2003, with the 1.8 and 2.0 petrol engines only. Spanish production began in May 2000 in Barcelona; the Almera Tino's 2.2-litre direct injection turbodiesel engine (YD22DDT) was also built in Spain, in Nissan's Madrid engine plant, while the petrol engines for the European model were built in Sunderland, UK.

In Japan as well as in Europe, the 2.0-litre petrol engine was only available coupled to Nissan's Hyper CVT transmission. The 1.8 was only available with a four-speed automatic transmission in Japan, while European buyers could only get this with a five-speed manual transmission (although the automatic became available after the facelift). The diesels were only ever available with manual transmissions, although a six-speed option appeared after the 2003 facelift. Japanese equipment levels were J, G, X, and Aerosports. European buyers received a welter of different equipment levels, with continental markets typically using names, such as Comfort, Tecna, or Acenta, while British buyers got to choose between acronyms (S, SE, SE+, SVE, and many others). Europeans also received a welter of special editions, such as the Twister, DVD, Hurricane, and even a Haribo edition for the French market.

The television advertisements for the Almera Tino in Japan in 1999 featured Mr. Bean, a character played by Rowan Atkinson. In April 2003 the Tino Hybrid went on sale in the Japanese market. The 1.8-litre petrol engine was revised to only produce 101 PS (74 kW), but while emissions were considerably improved, the gas mileage only improved marginally and compared badly to Honda and Toyota's contemporary offerings. Nissan quietly discontinued the model after a test run of 100 examples, only available online.

Aside from the most basic models, Almera Tinos got climate control and front electric windows, and additional equipment such as front and side airbags. Various safety extras like ABS, traction control, EBD, and active headrests were also available. Later models also received other extras such as a back-up camera and a satellite navigation system, made possible by the redesigned dashboard which included space for a 5.8-inch LCD screen. Early JDM Tinos had a front bench seat with a sixth seatbelt, and after the European model was presented, the five-seat layout became an available option across the board.

=== Facelift ===
A lightly facelifted model, with new head- and taillights and a redesigned interior, appeared in Japan in October 2002. The range was also reduced, with the six-seat layout as well as the 2-litre petrol engine discontinued, leaving only the 1.8 with five seats, in the J or X equipment levels. The redesigned model had an extremely short life in Japan, being discontinued in February 2003, after only five months on the market.

In January 2003, the Spanish-built Almera Tino was also updated, including a new steering wheel and new dials, whilst on the outside, the front indicators had clear plastic instead of orange, and the engines were revised. The diesel engine (renamed dCi rather than the earlier Di) benefitted from a new common rail injection system developed by Renault as part of the two companies' recent alliance. The Almera Tino also gained a more powerful diesel option, now offering 112 or 136 PS (82 or 100 kW) - thanks to a variable-geometry turbocharger being used in the more powerful engine. The top diesel option had 304 N⋅m (224 lb⋅ft) of torque at 2,000 rpm and was fitted with a 6-speed manual transmission.

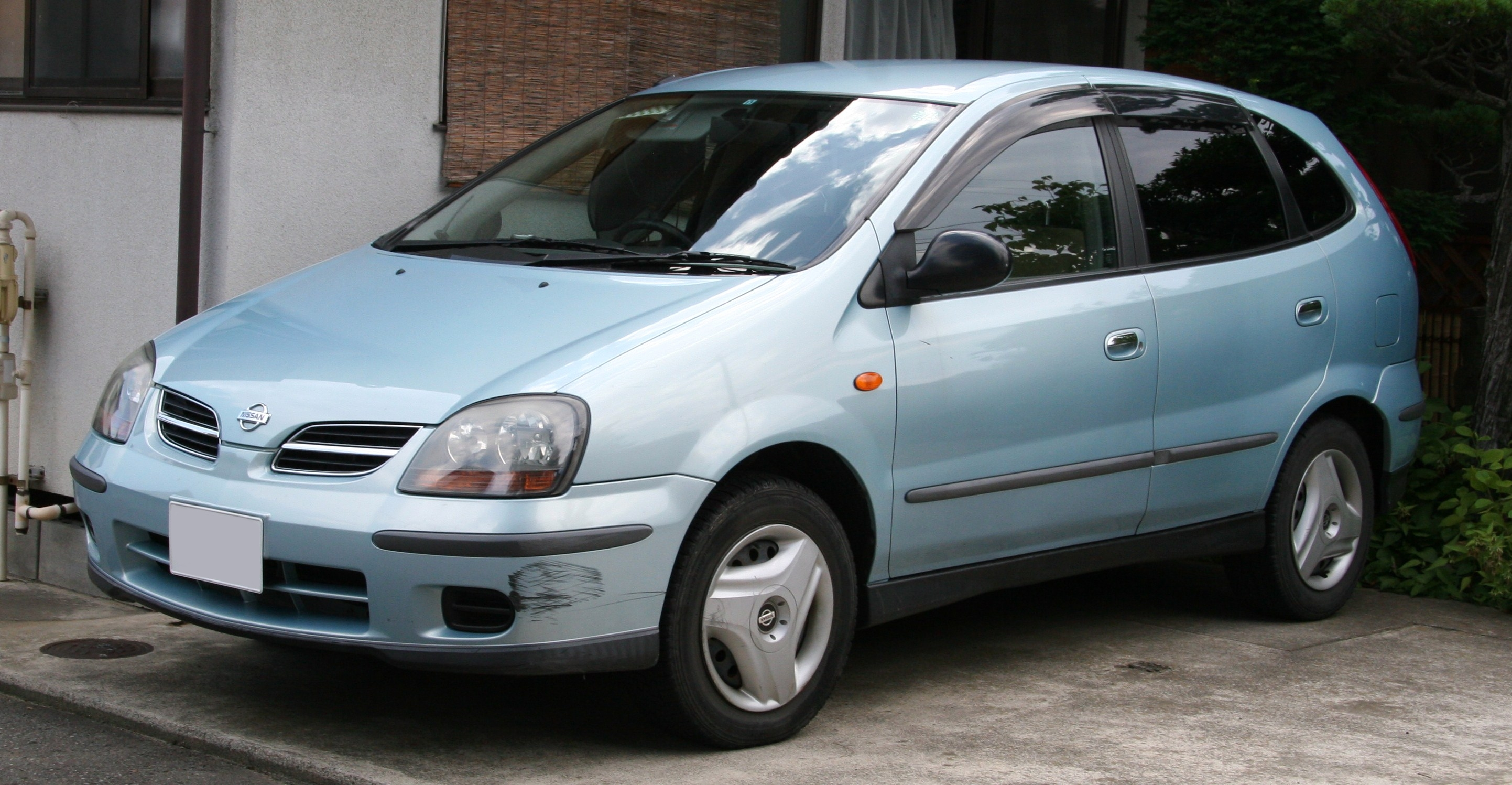
Pre-facelift Nissan Tino (Japan)

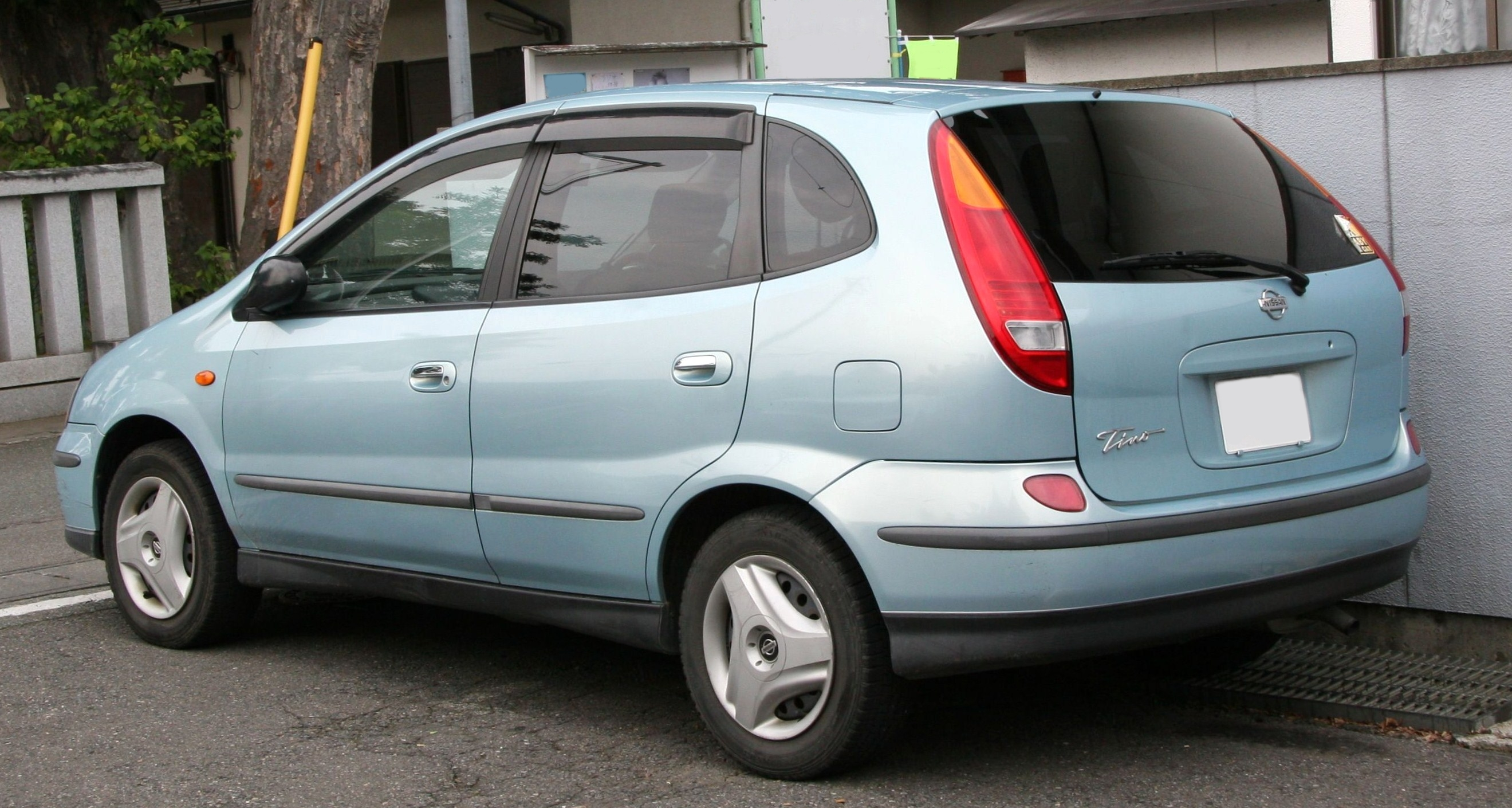
Pre-facelift Nissan Tino (Japan)

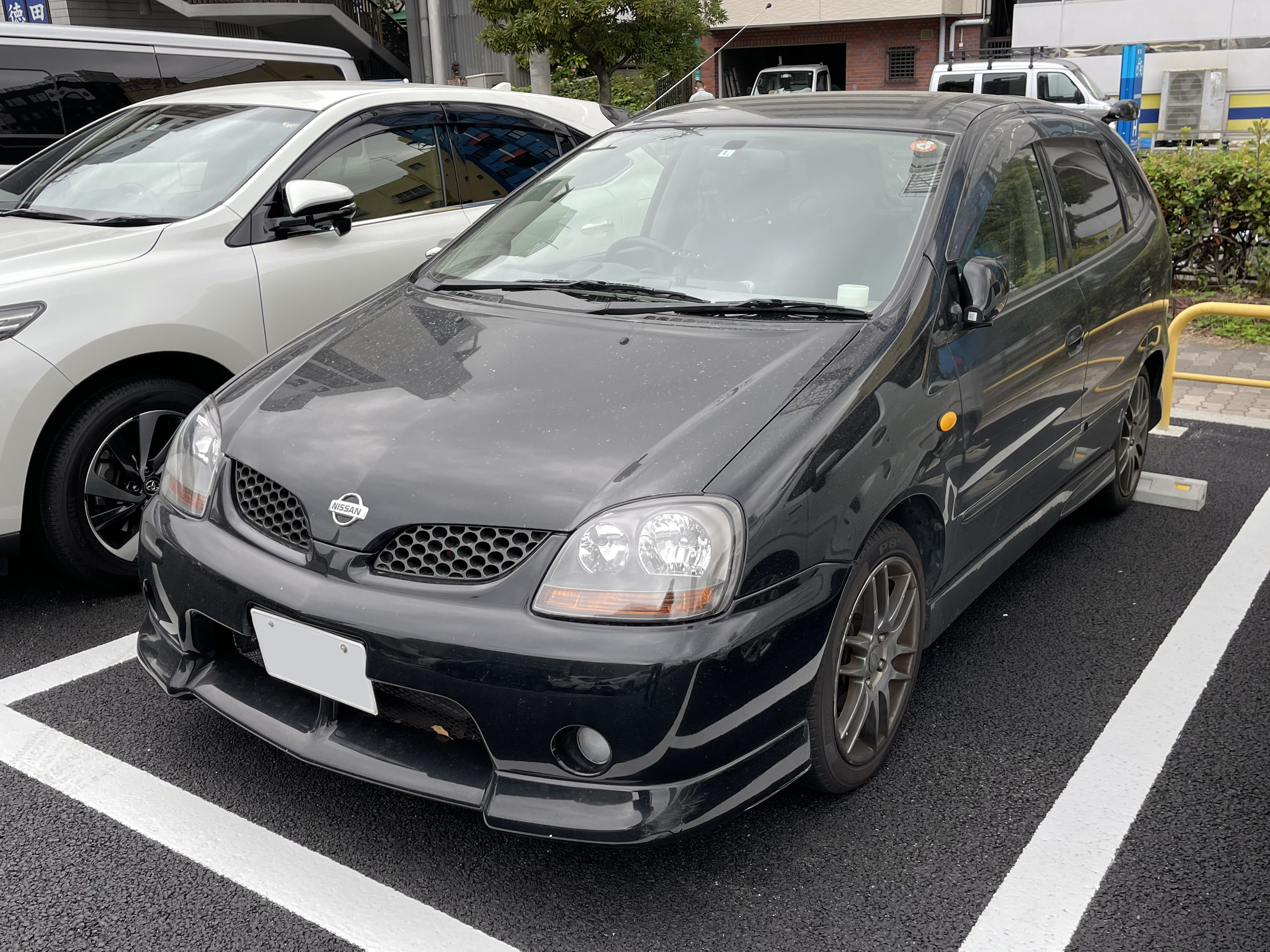
Pre-facelift Nissan Tino Aerosports (Japan)

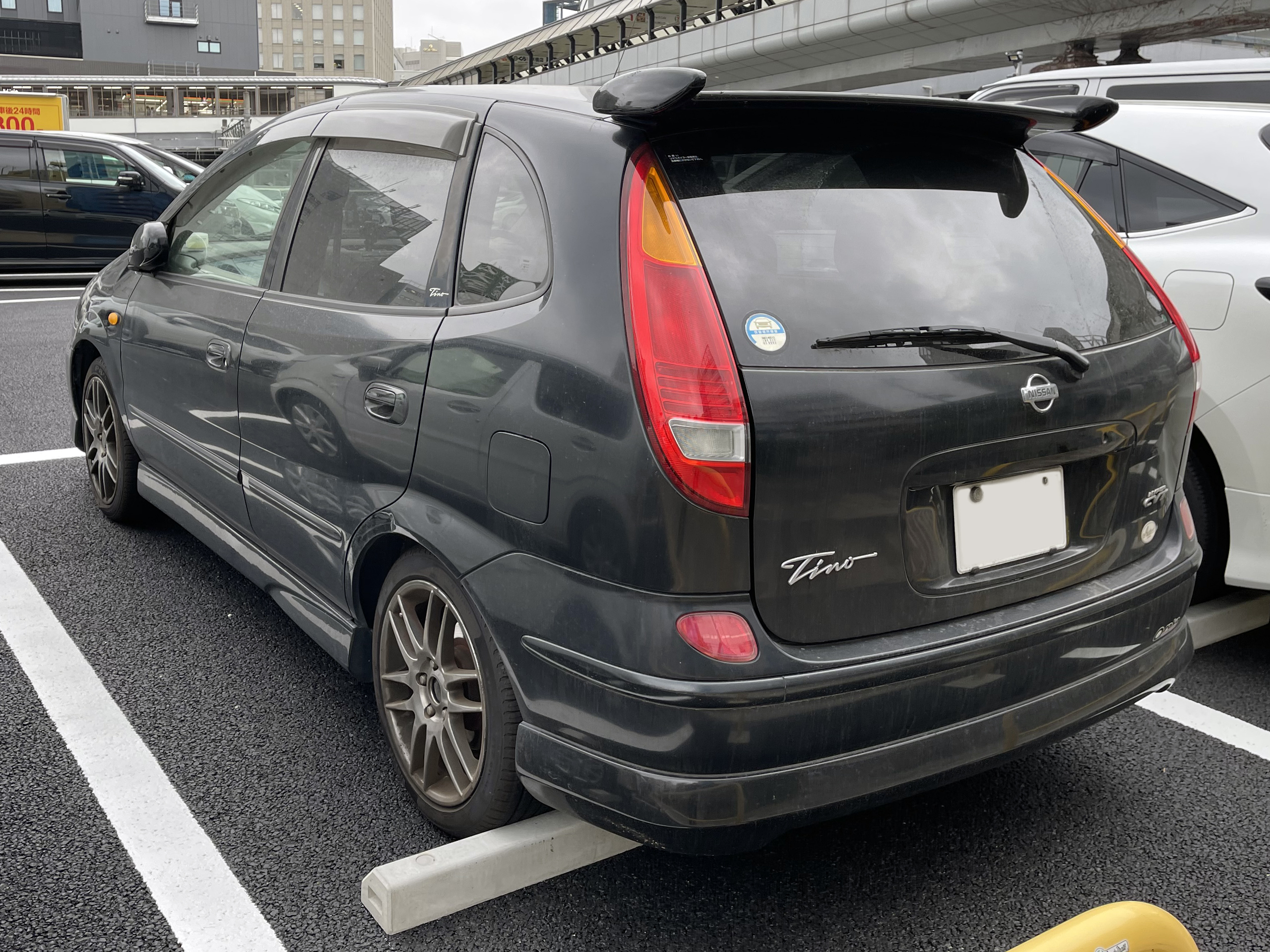
Pre-facelift Nissan Tino Aerosports (Japan)

== Engines ==
In the Tino range, there were four powertrains available, with three diesel engine variations:

- V10: 1,769 cc QG18DE 84 to 90 kW (114 to 122 PS) petrol with 4speed automatic transmission
- PV10: 1,769 cc QG18DE 74 kW (101 PS) petrol and EM29 17kW electric motor (hybrid) with CVT automatic transmission
- HV10: 1,998 cc SR20DE 100 kW (136 PS) petrol with CVT automatic transmission
- 2,184 cc YD22DDT 84 kW (114 PS) direct injection turbodiesel
- 2,184 cc YD22DDTi 82 kW (112 PS) common rail turbodiesel
- 2,184 cc YD22DDTi 100 kW (136 PS) common rail turbodiesel with variable vane turbocharger
