= Nissan Frontier =

The Nissan Frontier is a nameplate used on three different pickup truck models by Nissan:

- Nissan Frontier (international), an alternative nameplate for the NP300/Navara on some markets.
- Nissan Frontier (North America), a rebadged NP300/Navara from 1997 to 2021, then became a separate model since 2021.
- Nissan Frontier Pro, a rebadged Dongfeng Z9 that will be available from 2025.
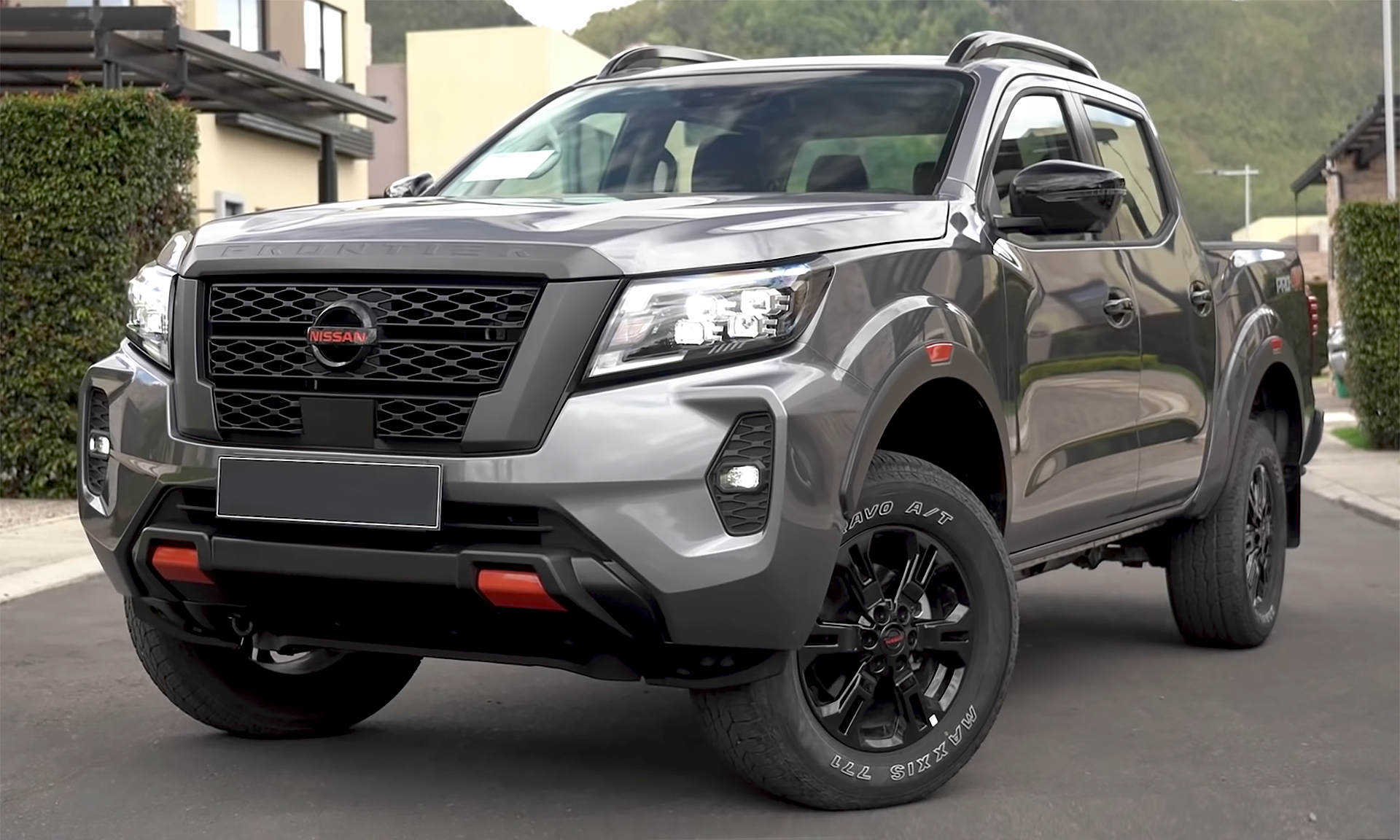
Nissan Frontier (international)

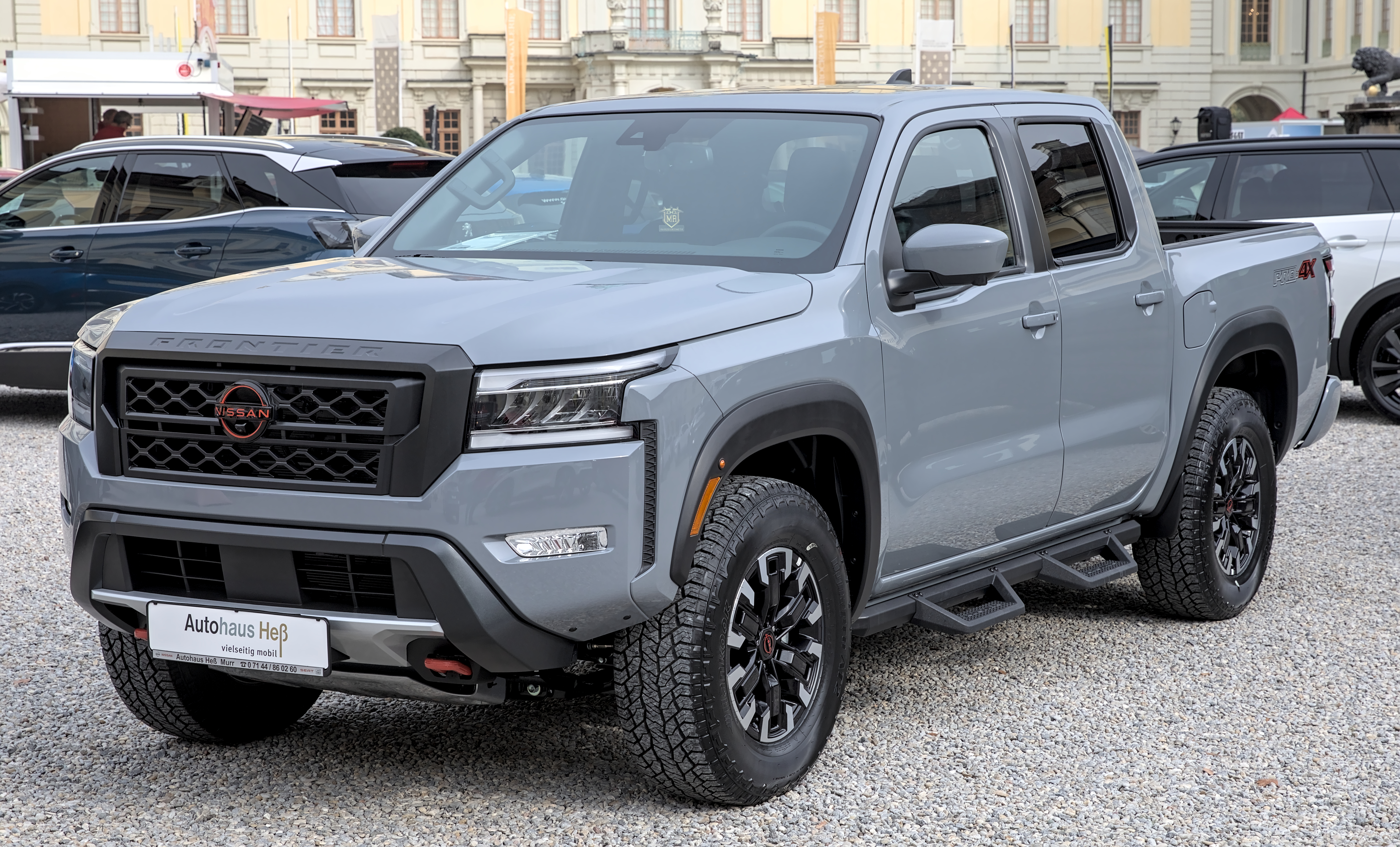
Nissan Frontier (North America)

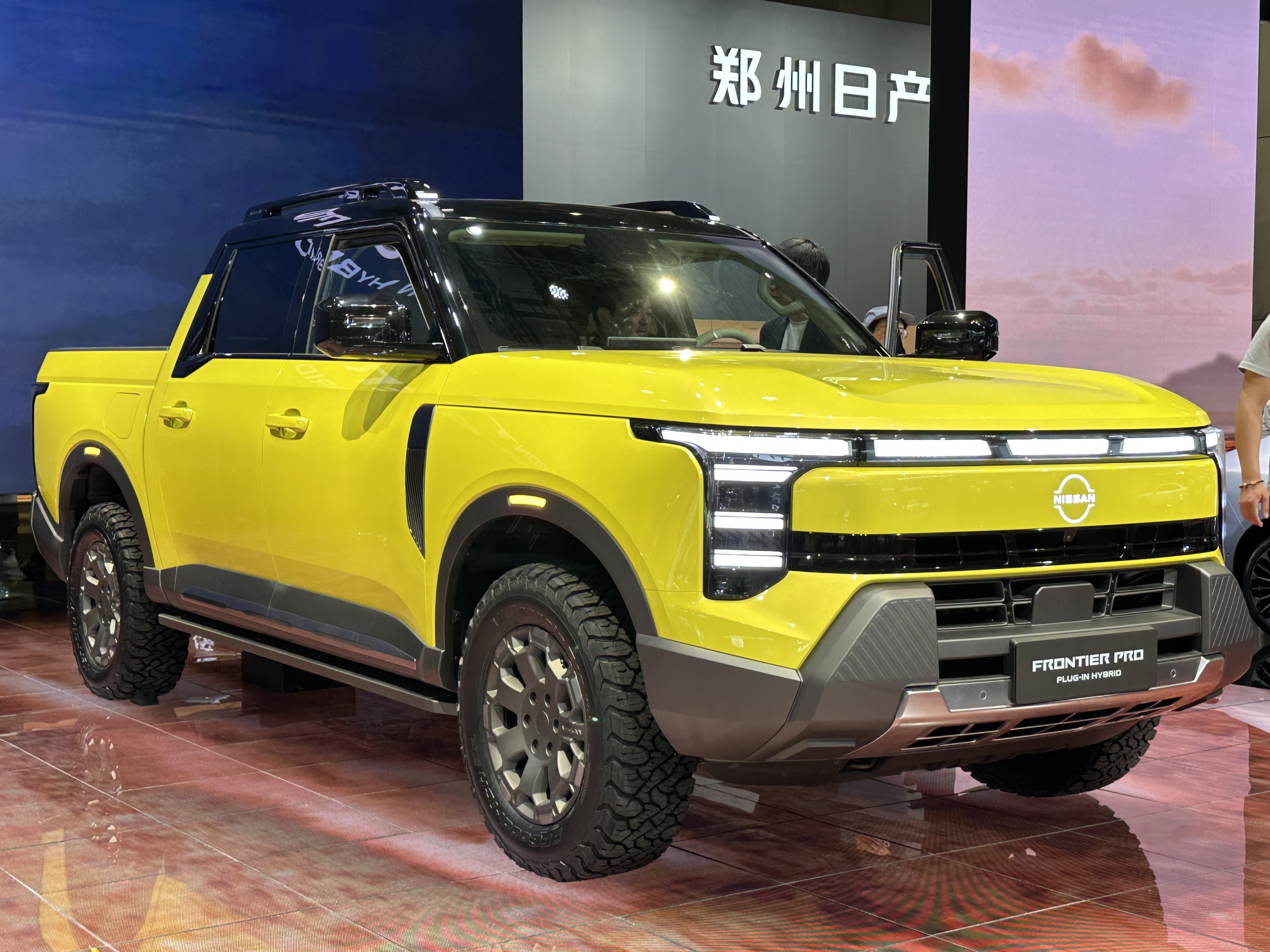
Nissan Frontier Pro
