= Nissan AD =

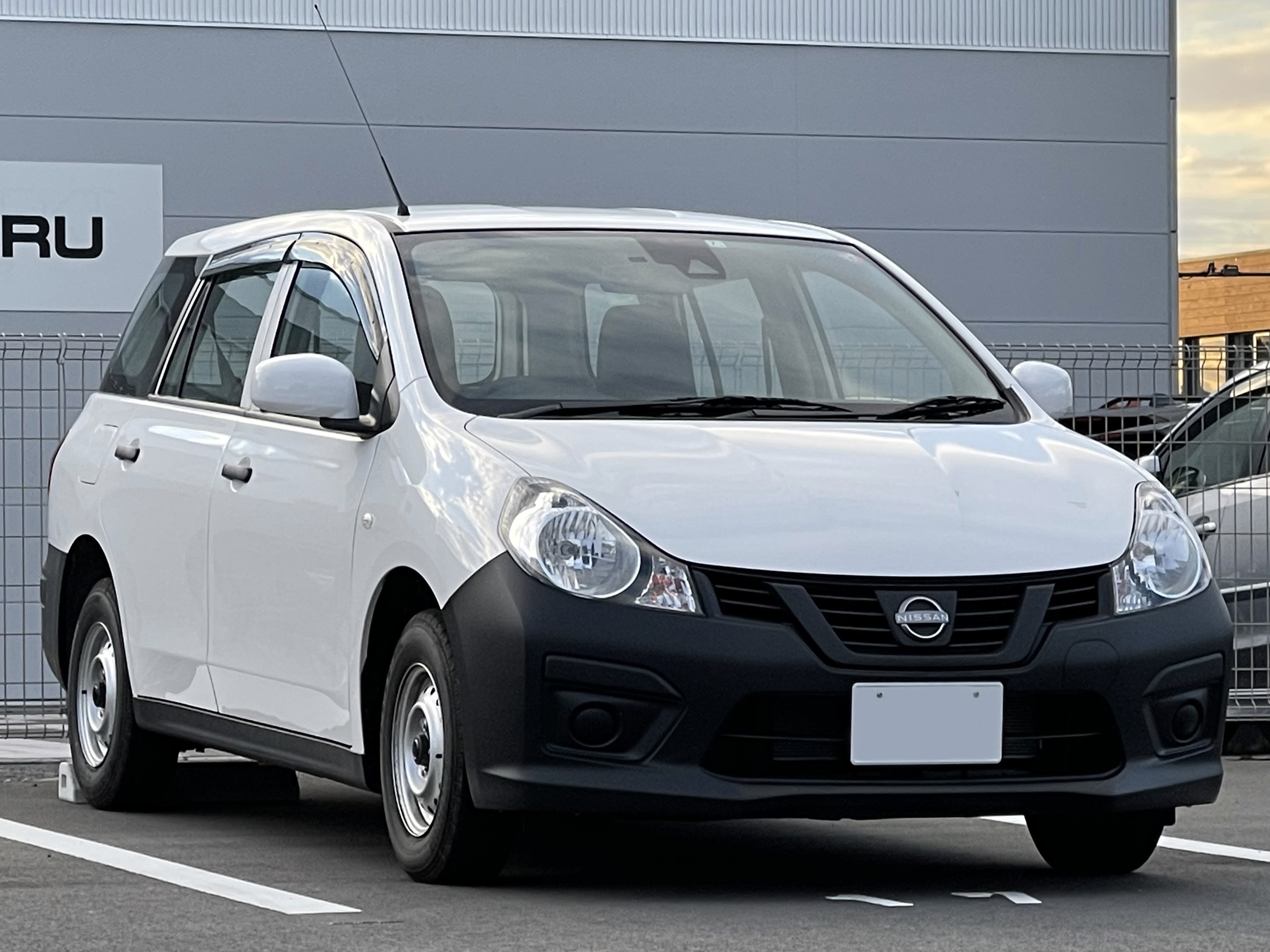
- 2021 Nissan AD DX (VY12)

Overview
- Manufacturer: Nissan
- Production: 1982–2025

Body and chassis
- Class: Compact car

Chronology
- Predecessor: Nissan Pulsar Van; Nissan/Datsun Sunny Van

The Nissan AD is a compact van and wagon built by Nissan for 1982 to 2025. Since 1996, the AD has also been sold as a passenger car under the Nissan Wingroad (Japanese: 日産・ウイングロード, Hepburn: Nissan Wingurōdo) moniker. The range has received an extensive variety of nameplates over the years and in different markets and has also been sold as a Mitsubishi, a Mazda, and a Subaru. In January 2025, Nissan announced that production would end in November of that year, citing slowing sales and a need for corporate restructuring.

== VB11 series ==
AD Van VB11
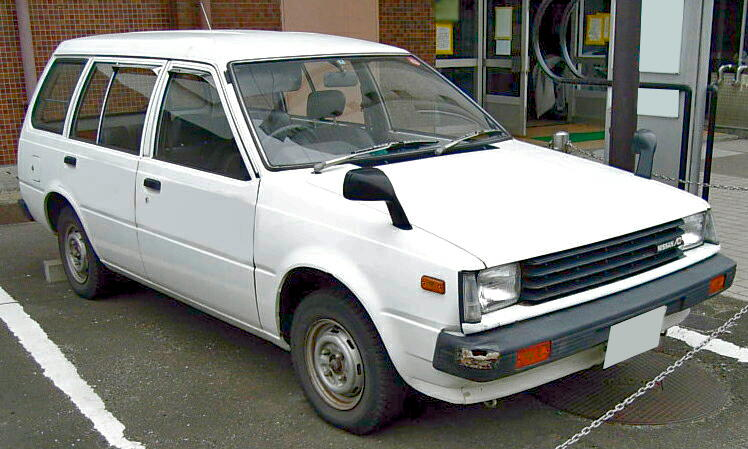

Overview
- Also called: Nissan Datsun AD Van; Nissan Pulsar Van, AD Van; Nissan Sunny Van, AD Van
- Production: October 1982 – 1990
- Assembly: Japan: Zama Plant, Zama, Kanagawa

Body and chassis
- Body style: 3/5-door van/wagon
- Layout: Front-engine, front-wheel-drive
- Related: Nissan Sunny (B11)

Powertrain
- Engine: 1270 cc E13S I4 (VB11); 1487 cc E15S I4 (VHB11); 1680 cc CD17 diesel I4 (VSB11)

Dimensions
- Wheelbase: 2,400 mm (94.5 in)
- Length: 4,085–4,110 mm (160.8–161.8 in)
- Width: 1,620 mm (63.8 in)
- Height: 1,465 mm (57.7 in)
- Curb weight: 790–840 kg (1,742–1,852 lb)

In October 1982, the AD Van supplemented (and also gradually replaced) the commercial delivery vans based on Nissan's other vehicles. In 1983, the Nissan Cedric van was discontinued, as was the Nissan Gloria van. It originally came with four front doors and a liftback hatch in back. In July 1983, a two-door version was introduced, meaning that the earlier B310 Sunny Van could finally be retired. The AD range was based on the B11 series Nissan Sunny wagon but has a more square-rigged and utilitarian appearance.

This wagon was sold in Japan as the Sunny AD Van at Nissan Satio Store and as the Pulsar AD Van at Nissan Cherry Store. It was also sold as the "Nissan Datsun AD Van", to tie it together with the Nissan Datsun, which was the name used for the Nissan Pickup in the Japanese Domestic Market.

It came with three engines; the 1.3 and 1.5-litre carburetted E13S and E15S and the 1.7-litre CD17 diesel engine. The transmissions were either a four- or five-speed manual transmission, with the availability of a three-speed automatic for the bigger of the gasoline options. Power outputs for 1984 models in Japan are 75 PS (55 kW), 85 PS (63 kW), and 61 PS (45 kW) respectively.

The rear suspension was designed for commercial usage, so it used a simple leaf spring setup and wasn't intended for ride quality. Low cost, light weight, and a flat, low loading floor were the main consideration. The AD van was designed for very basic duties, and the options list was kept small to enhance economical use and running costs. The AD van used a front wheel drive engine configuration shared with the Sunny. The AD Van was marketed as the Nissan Sunny in some European markets such as Belgium (glazed five-door), beginning with the 1984 model year. In the Netherlands this version was sold as a "Stationwagen" as well as a van, both with the 1.3-liter engine. The United Kingdom received three versions of the three-door Sunny panel van, all with the 1.3-litre E13 engine and 60 hp (45 kW). Payload is 505 kg (1,113 lb).

The AD van remained basically unchanged, except for minor cosmetic changes until the second generation was introduced in 1990 with the Y10 series. The three-door van was also available as a strict two-seater.

Nissan Australia sold the VB11 three-door panel van as part of the Nissan Pulsar range between September 1983 and December 1985, replacing the Sunny (B310) panel van that had been discontinued earlier in 1983. The Pulsar panel van was fitted with the 1.3-liter E13 engine and a four-speed manual transmission. The Pulsar van weighed 840 kg (1,852 lb) and had a payload rating of 540 kg (1,190 lb).

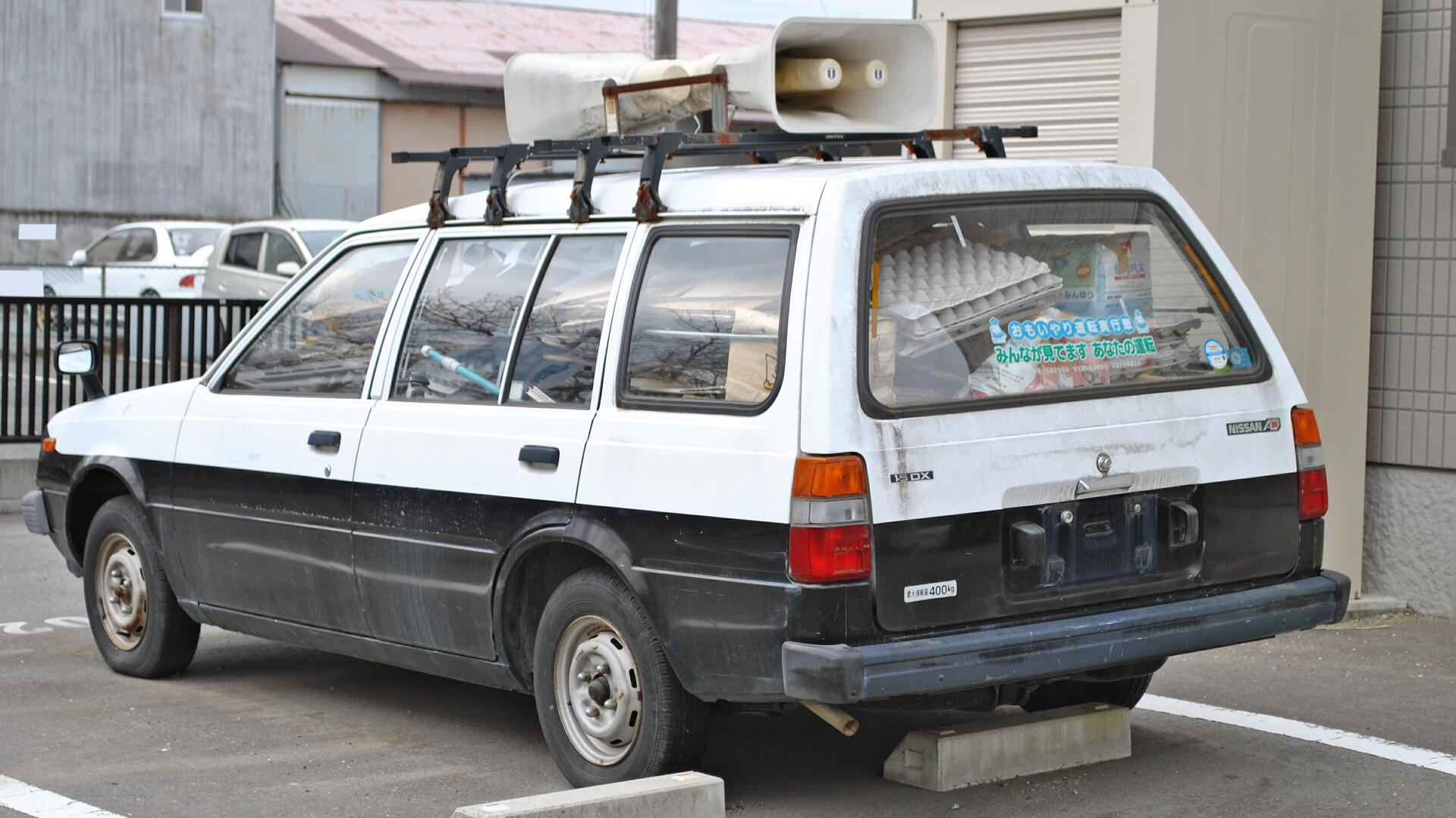
1985 Nissan AD Van 1.5 DX (VHB11)

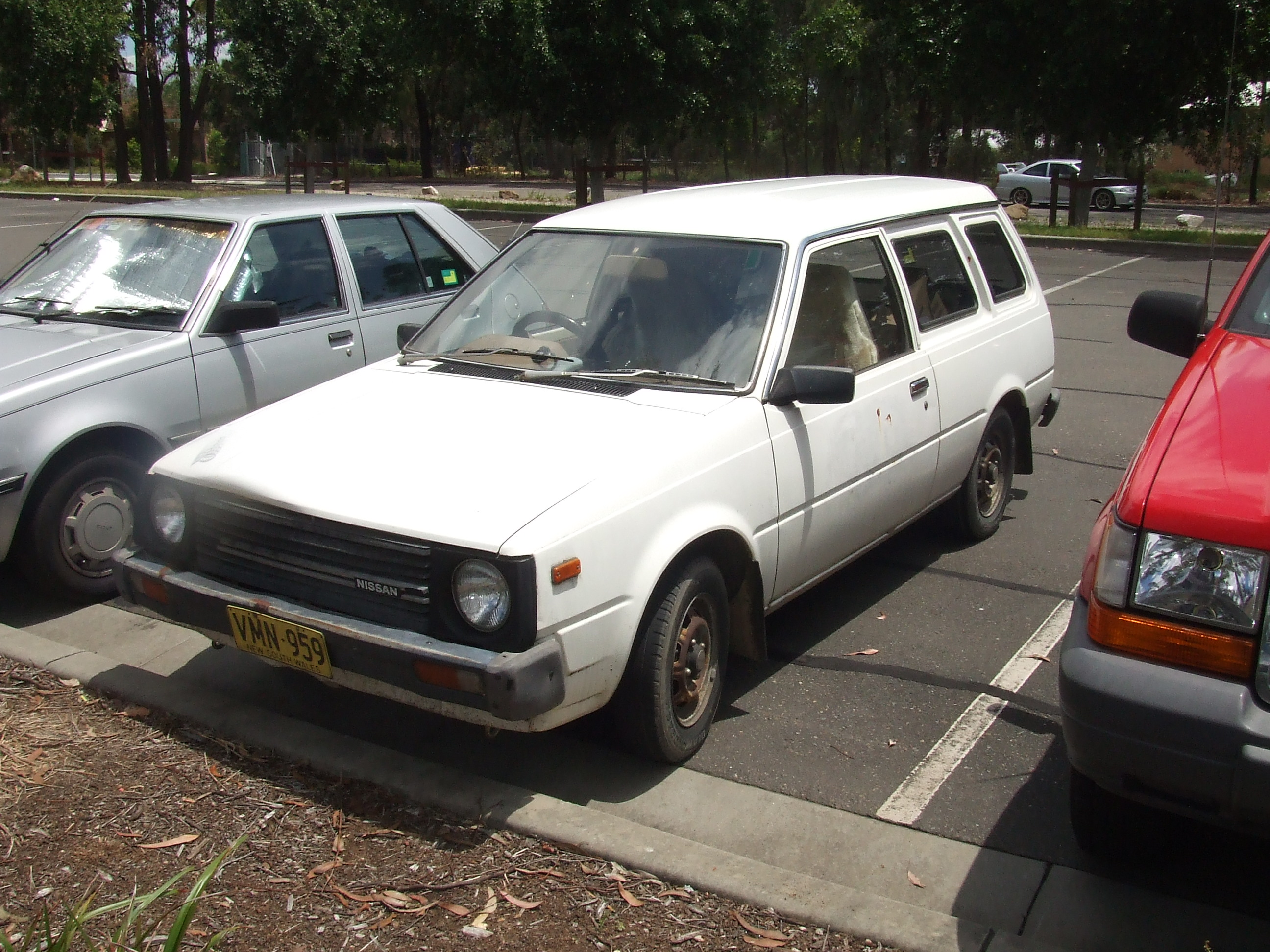
Nissan Pulsar 1.3 DX (VB11, Australia)

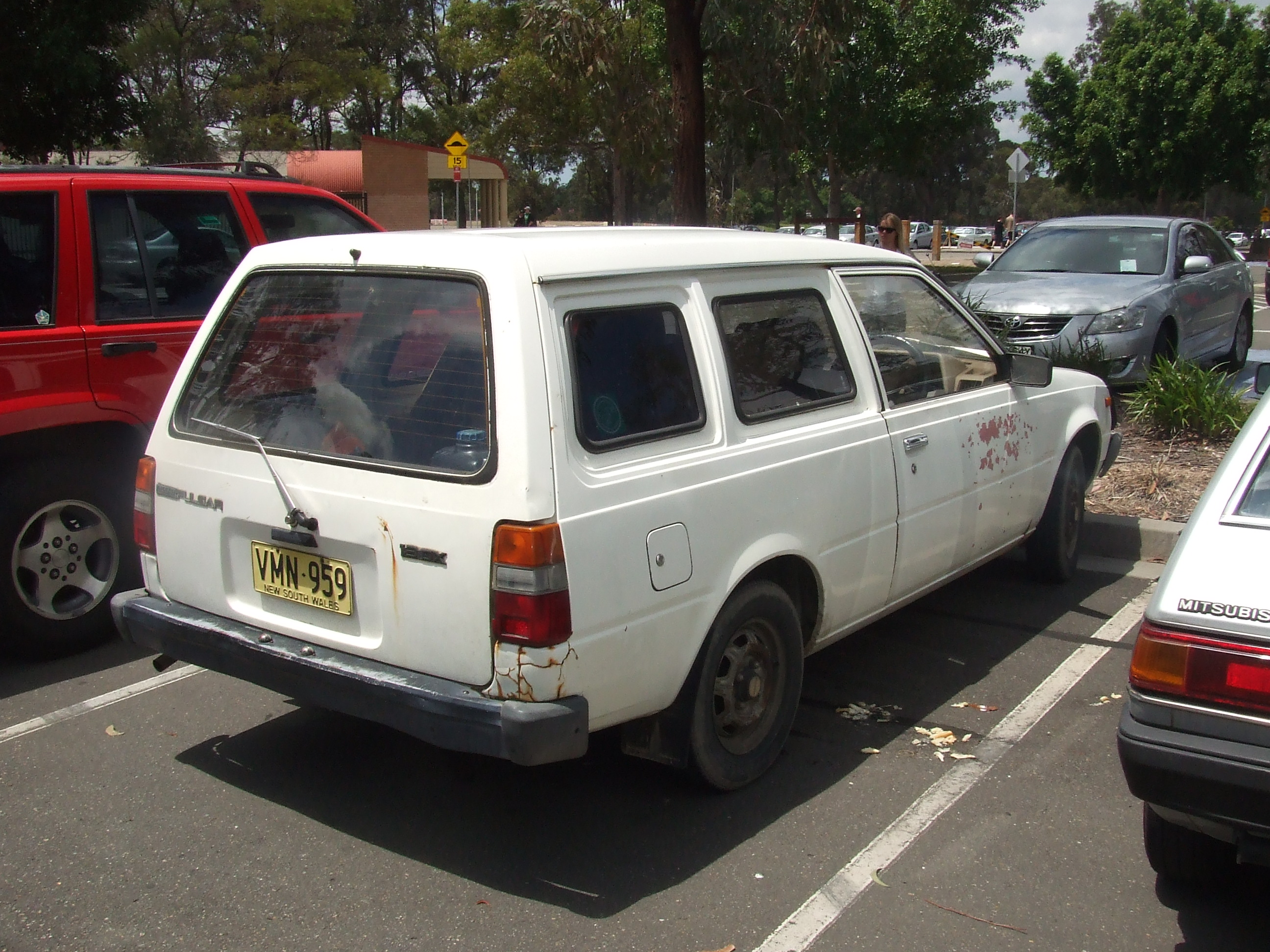
Nissan Pulsar 1.3 DX (VB11, Australia: rear)

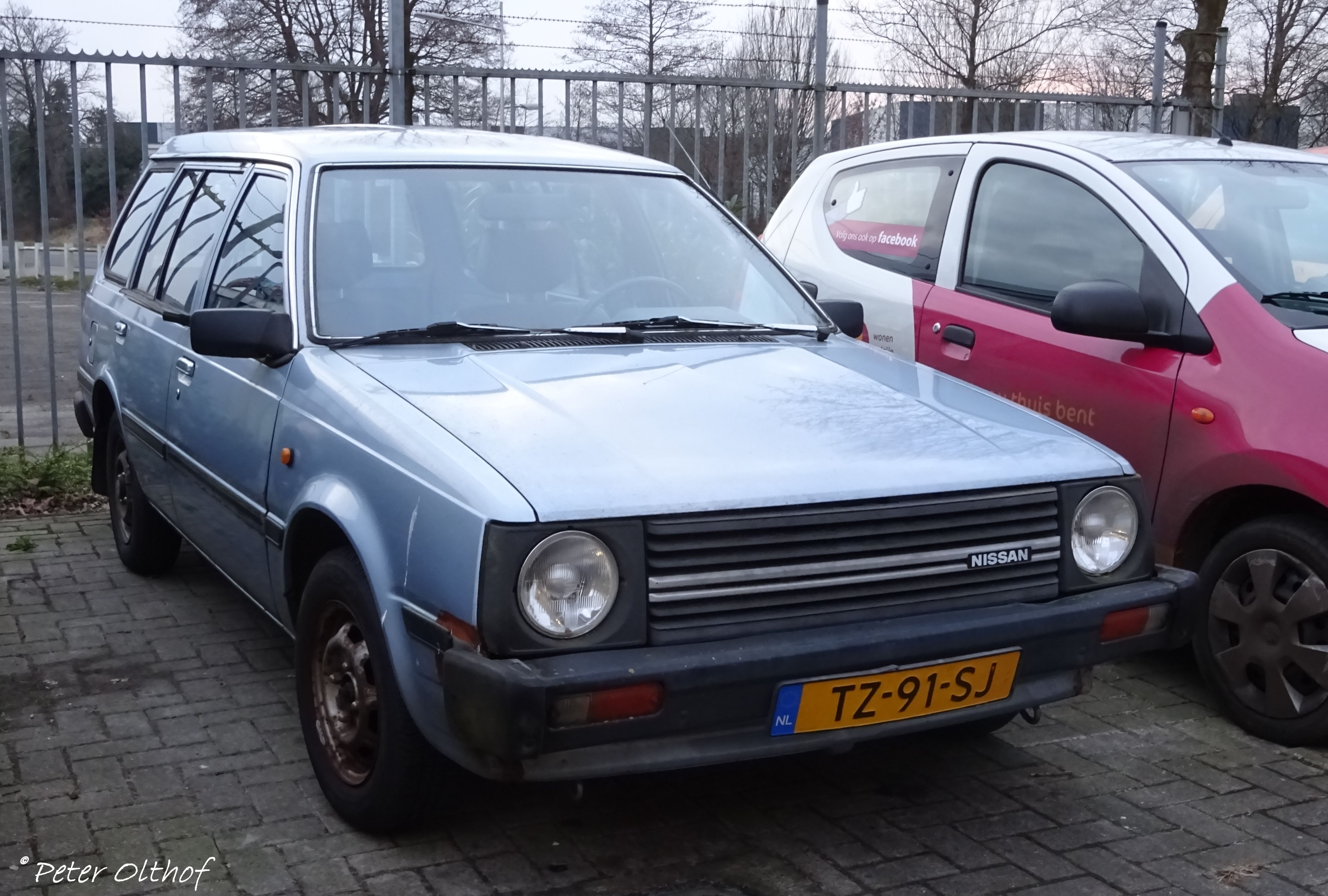
1989 Nissan Sunny 1.3 DX Wagon (VB11, Europe)

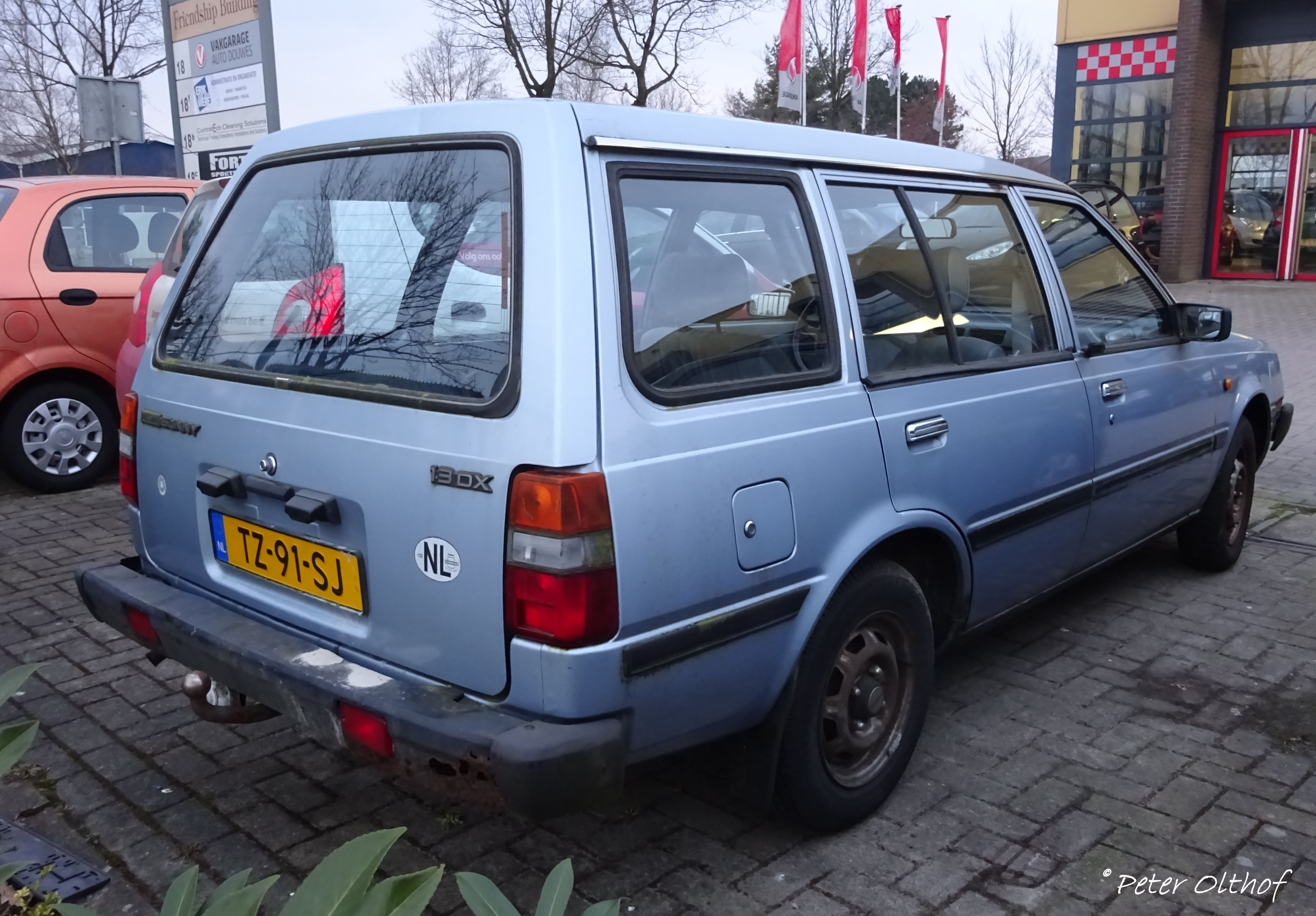
1989 Nissan Sunny 1.3 DX Wagon (VB11, Europe: rear)

== Y10 series ==
Nissan AD Y10
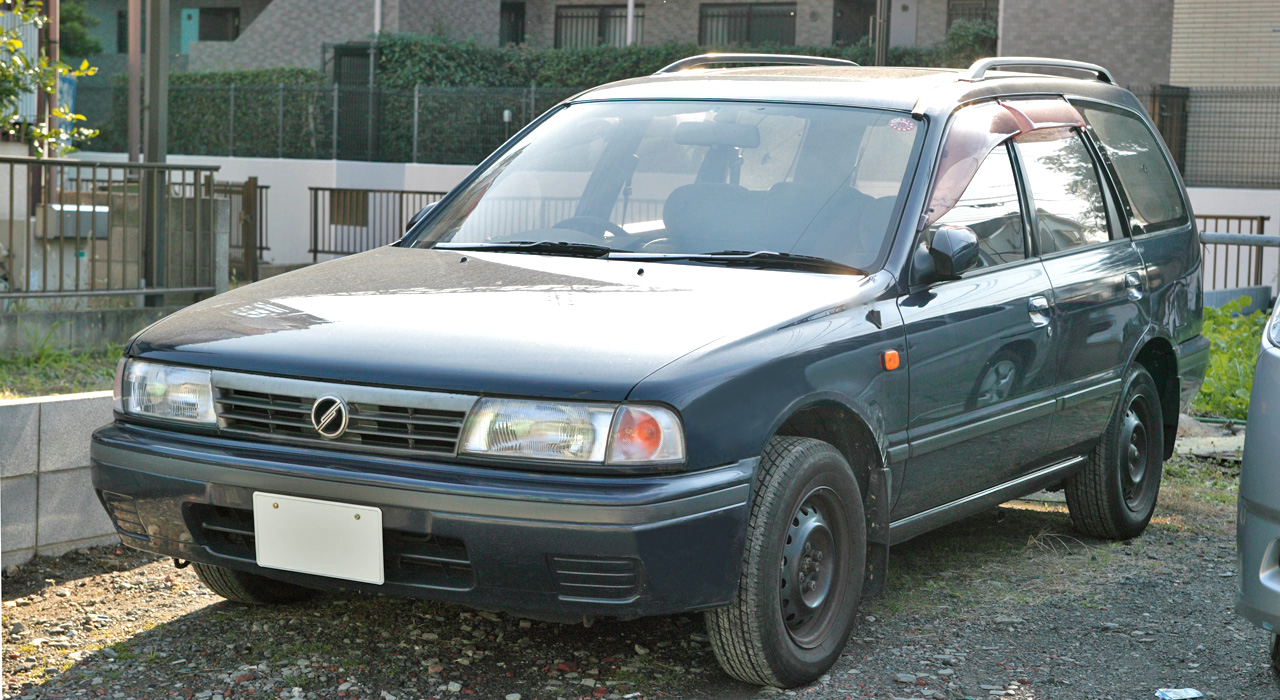

Overview
- Also called: Nissan Sunny California (Japan); Nissan Sunny Wagon/Van (Europe); Nissan Sentra Wagon (New Zealand); Nissan AD Resort (Thailand, Philippines, and Malaysia); Nissan Wingroad (Japan); Nissan Tsubame (Mexico); Nissan NRV (Taiwan); Nissan NV Pick-up/Queen Cab/Wingroad (Thailand); Subaru Leone Van (1994–1999); Mazda Familia Wagon/Van (1994–1999)
- Production: October 1990-1999; 1992-2004 (Mexico)
- Assembly: Japan: Oppama Plant, Yokosuka, Kanagawa; Thailand: Samut Prakarn; Philippines: Santa Rosa City, Laguna

Body and chassis
- Body style: 5-door van/wagon 2-door coupe utility
- Layout: Front-engine, front-wheel-drive
- Related: Nissan Pulsar N14; Nissan Rasheen; Nissan Sunny B13

Powertrain
- Engine: petrol: 1.3 L GA13DS/GA13DE I4 (Y10); 1.5 L GA15DS/GA15DE I4 (FY10); 1.6 L GA16DS/GA16DE I4; 1.8 L SR18DE I4 (HY10); 2.0 L SR20DE I4 (HY10); diesel: 1.7 L CD17 I4 (SY10); 2.0 L CD20 I4 (EY10)
- Transmission: 5-speed manual 3/4-speed automatic

Dimensions
- Wheelbase: 2,400 mm (94.5 in); 2,470 mm (97.2 in) (AD Max/NV Pick-up/Queen Cab/Wingroad)
- Length: 4,175–4,270 mm (164.4–168.1 in)
- Width: 1,665–1,680 mm (65.6–66.1 in)
- Height: 1,470–1,820 mm (57.9–71.7 in)

The second-generation AD Van (sold as the Sunny Wagon in Europe, where it was treated as part of the N14 family), introduced in October 1990, replaced the Nissan Sunny B12 series wagon, but with a different rear end compared to exported standard Sunny wagons. The vehicle continued as the AD Van, whereas for private use (non-commercial) it was marketed as the Nissan Sunny California wagon (Y10). The engines used were the 1.5 L and 1.3 L GA15DS & GA13DS with DOHC and the 1.7 L CD17 diesel continued. The Wingroad/AD Van were also accompanied by a larger retail/commercial station wagon/delivery van called the Avenir/Expert that replaced the Nissan Bluebird U12 wagon/delivery van.

In May 1996, Nissan renamed the Sunny California the Nissan Wingroad – a California equipment level was initially available through Nissan's Sunny dealership chain. The Wingroad was offered with the SR18DE as well as the GA15DE, while the smallest 1.3 and the diesel option were not available. Trying to cash in on Japan's RV ("recreational vehicle", usually versions of existing vans and wagons combining a slight off-road vibe with sporty equipment) craze of the late 1990s. The Wingroad followed this recipe closely, being a winged and despoilered version of the AD Van, usually with more powerful engines. Four-wheel drive was optional. Unusually, the Wingroad also received a redesigned, larger rear end with a longer rear overhang. A limited-edition model built by Autech with the SR20DE was also available; since this was not an official Nissan engine installation it carried the same chassis code as the 1.8. The Wingroad name originated as a trim level on the Bluebird U11-series wagon.

April 1992 saw the introduction of the AD Max, with an unusual raised cargo bay. This model was called a fourgonnette, after the French designation, and received two French doors in the back and two doors for the passengers. The wheelbase was extended by 70 mm (2.8 in) to 2,470 mm (97.2 in), with the height of the cargo area measured to be 1,810 mm (71.3 in). Overall length also increased, to 4,270–4,290 mm (168.1–168.9 in). Two rear wipers were installed on each of the French doors. Suzuki also tried this approach with the Suzuki Alto Hustle. The AD Max was available with regular rectangular side windows or a more unusual triangular arrangement (pictured), as well as a panelled version of the latter. Sales were never improssive and the model was not replaced when the AD was updated in 1999, but nowadays the AD Max has become a collectors' item.

In Europe, the panel van version of the AD Max was sold as the Nissan Sunny Van from May 1992 until April 1998. Cargo load in European specifications ranged up to 585 kg (1,290 lb), depending on model and specifications. Most markets only received this with the 55 PS (40 kW) CD17 diesel engine, but Nissan also offered the GA16 engine - briefly carburetted at the time of introduction, this was replaced by the fuel injected GA16DE in October 1992.

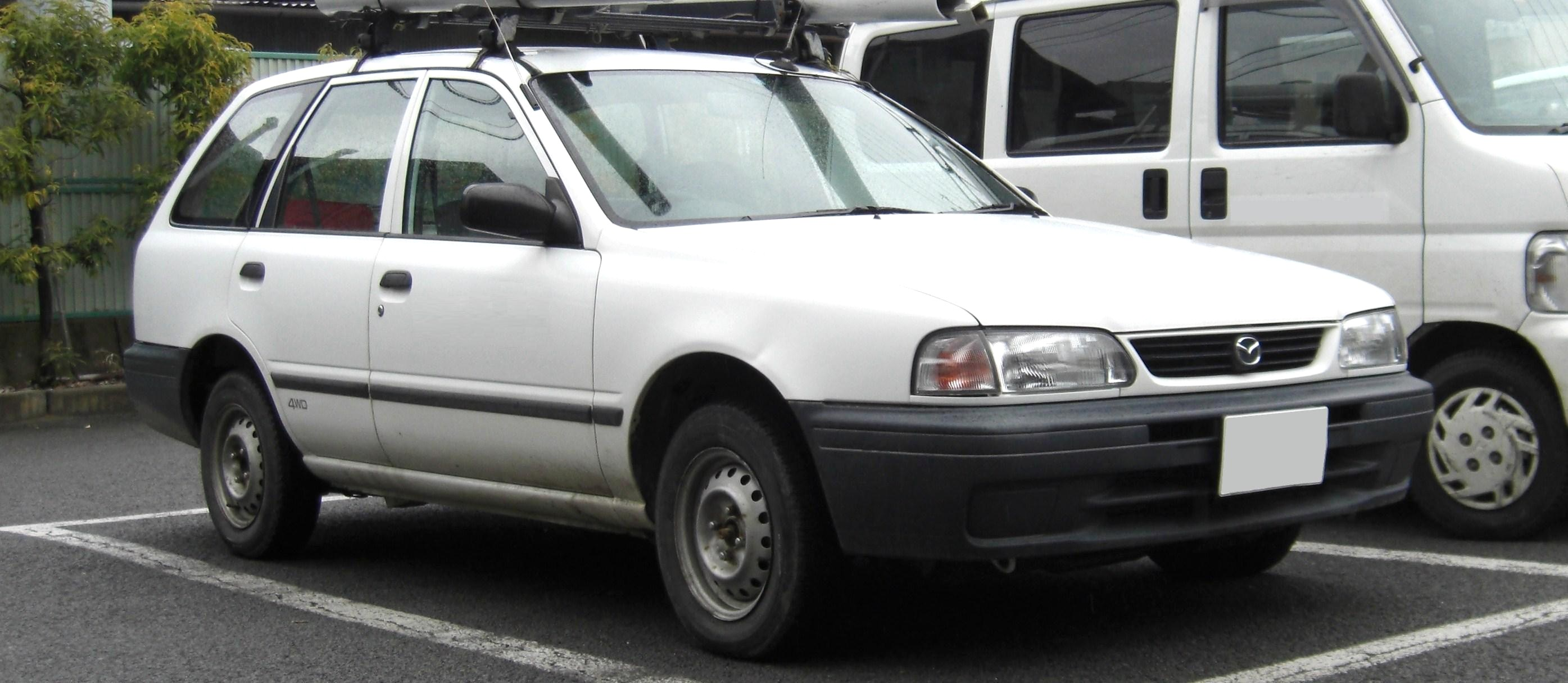
Mazda Familia Wagon Y10

August 1993 saw minor changes, with the 1.3-litre model's automatic transmission upgraded to a four-speed unit. The Wingroad transmission selections were either the four-speed automatic or a five-speed manual.

The Wingroad JS trim level shares an appearance with the larger Nissan Avenir Blastar, and both also use a two-tone paint scheme.

Beginning in April 1994, the Y10 series AD van was also sold as the Subaru Leone Van and from August 1994 as the Mazda Familia Wagon/Van light commercial vehicle. The Subaru version was added as a result of the Leone platform having been replaced by the Subaru Impreza; the Impreza has a reduced size cargo area on the wagon/five-door hatchback and was not suitable for a commercial derivative. The Subaru version was continued to be available in the Y11 generation but was discontinued in 2001, as the Sambar was encroaching on Leone sales. The Mazda Familia-badged AD derivatives continued to be offered in the succeeding generations until June 2018.

April 1996 saw a driver-side airbag added as an extra-cost option. May 1997 saw minor cosmetic changes: the 1.3- and 1.5-liter GA13DE and GA15DE engines replaced the GA13DS and GA15DS versions for better emissions performance, the 2.0 L CD20 diesel engine was introduced with the ATTESA 4WD system, and ventilated front disc-brakes were introduced on all trim levels. The front windshield wipers were offered with a de-icer option.

The Y10 platform was introduced to Thailand, Taiwan and Malaysia in September 1993 as the Nissan AD Resort. A pickup truck body version was available in Thailand as AD "Wingroad" (which was different from the Japanese-market Wingroad version). The Y10 was also built in Thailand under license as the Nissan NV. This was built on the longer wheelbase of the AD Max in a bewildering array of bodystyles to suit the Thai buyers' penchant for pickup trucks, including a double-cab ute. There was also a wagon version based on the pickup, essentially going full circle from the original AD Wagon. Thai cars mostly received the GA16DS engine with 95 PS (70 kW).

In Mexico, only the station wagon body of the Y10 AD was marketed between 1993 and 2001, being named Nissan Tsubame (a Japanese term which refers the woodswallow bird species, and also the name of a city in Niigata, Japan - súbame also means "lift me up" in Spanish). This model was introduced in 1993 as a local companion for the then recently launched B13-series saloon range (Sunny/Sentra, designated "Nissan Tsuru" in the Mexican market) as there was no B13-based wagon, unlike the former B12 and B11 platforms. The Tsubame range featured two trim levels: GS and GST.

=== Gallery ===
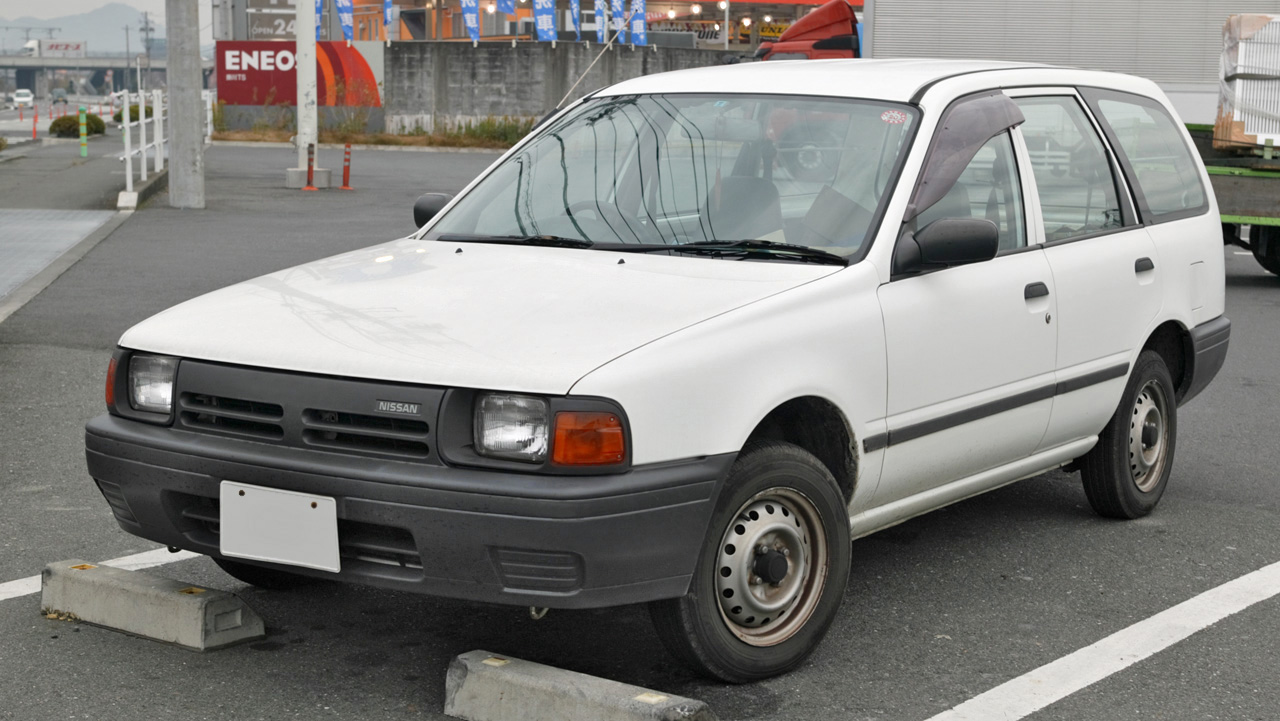
Y10 Nissan AD van 1.5 VE

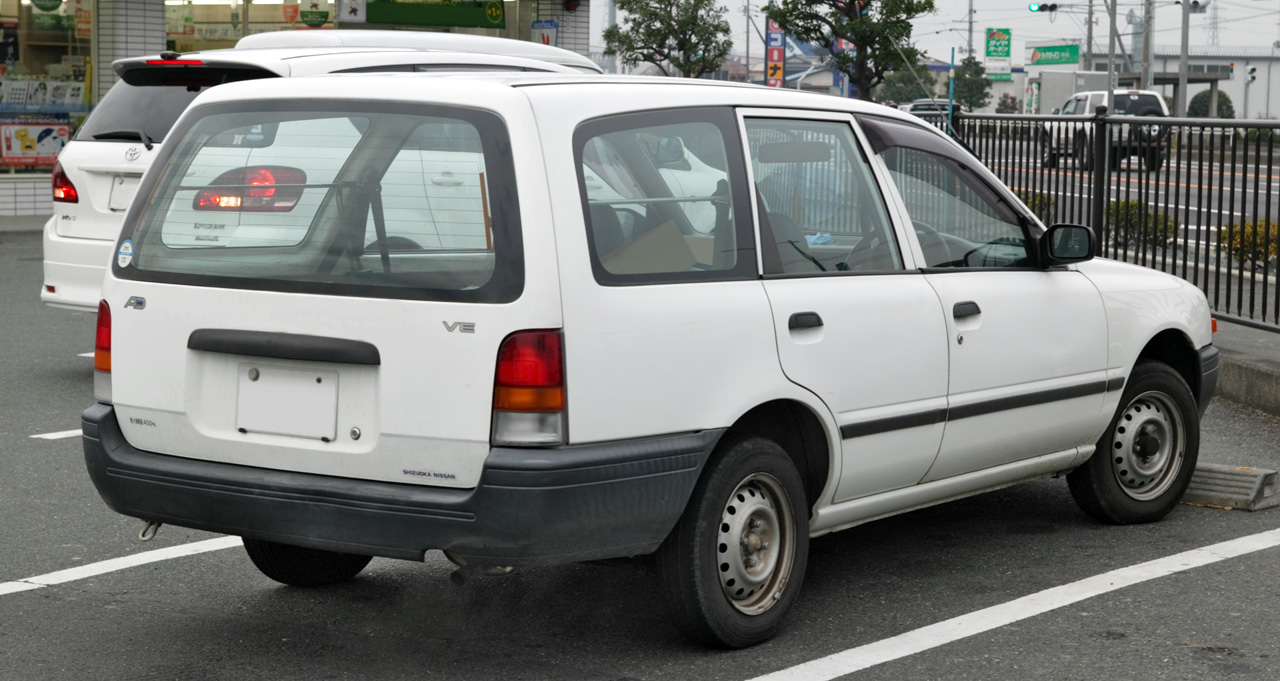
Y10 Nissan AD van rear

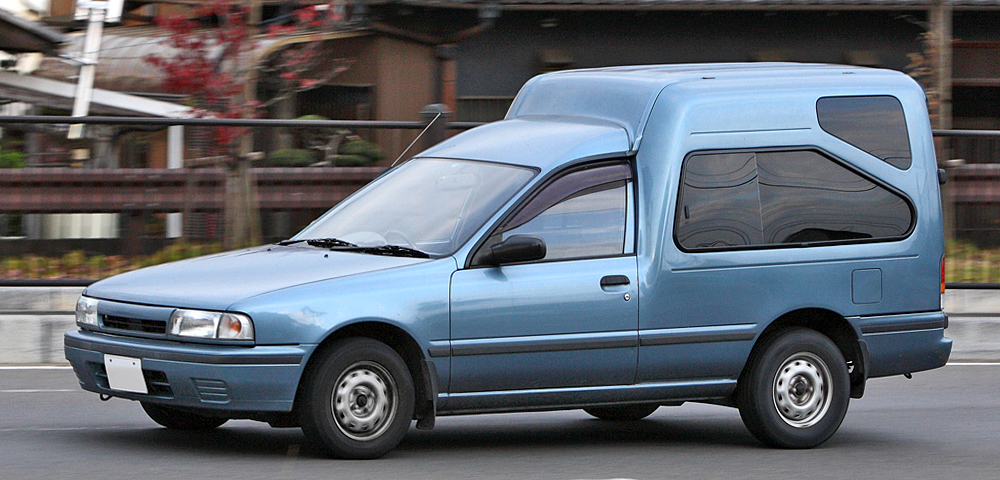
Y10 Nissan AD Max

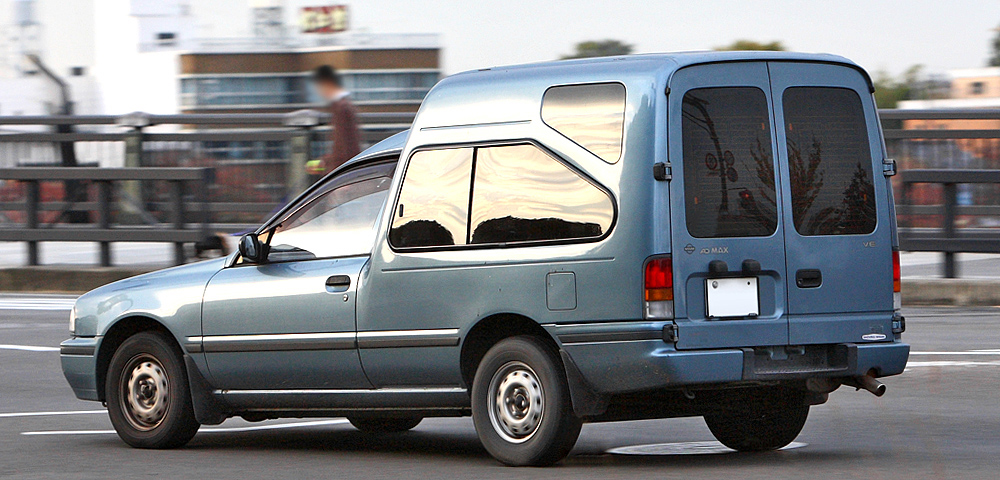
Nissan AD Max (rear)

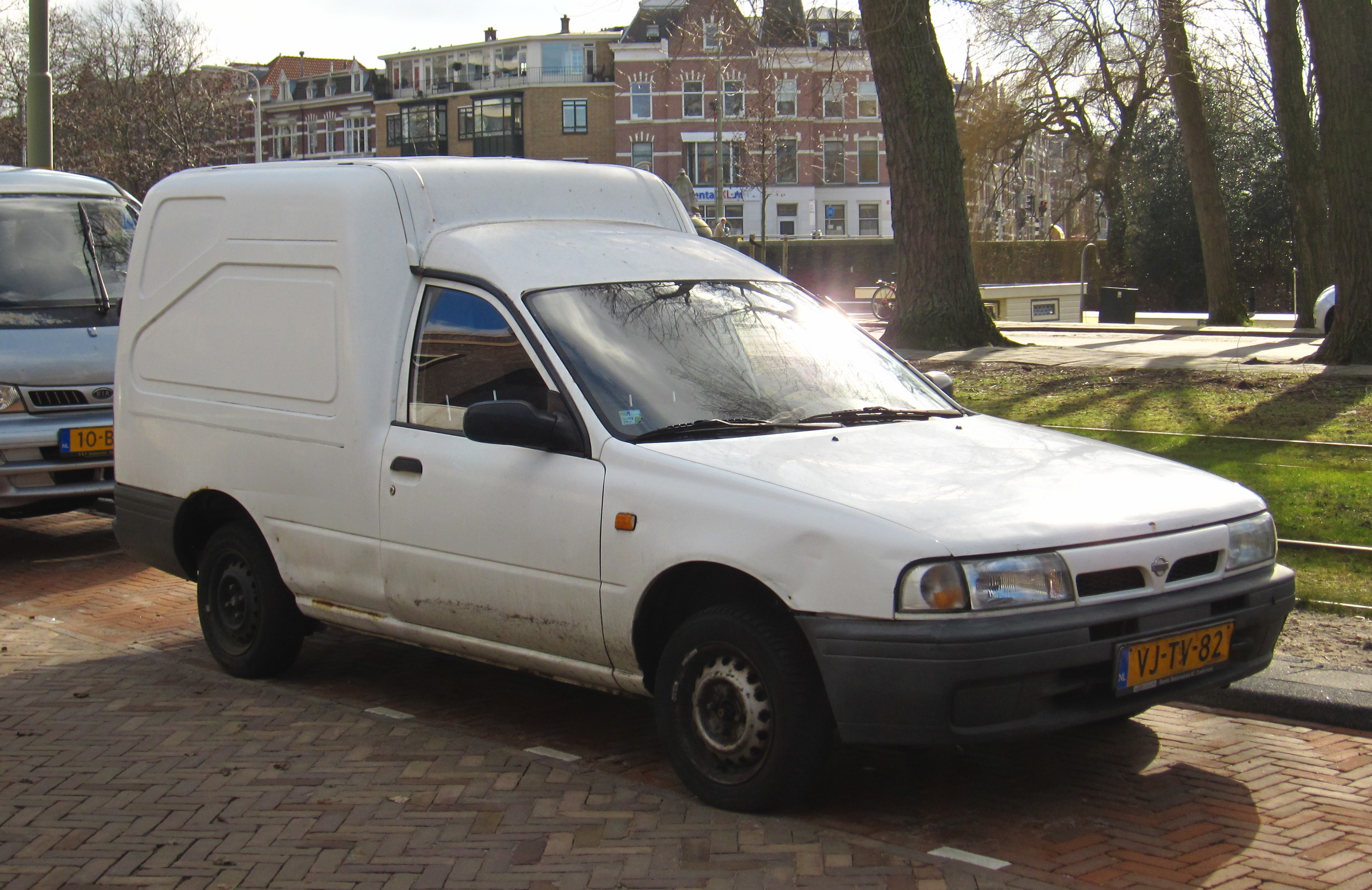
Nissan Sunny Van (Europe)

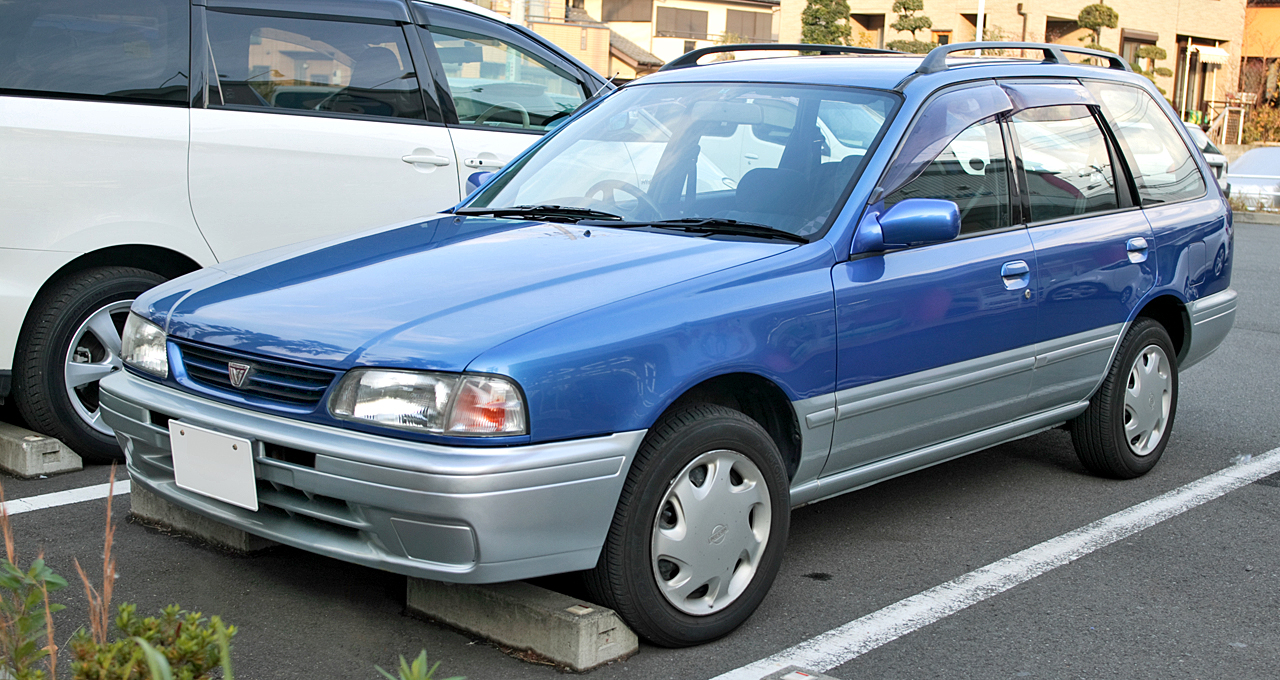
Y10 Nissan Wingroad JS

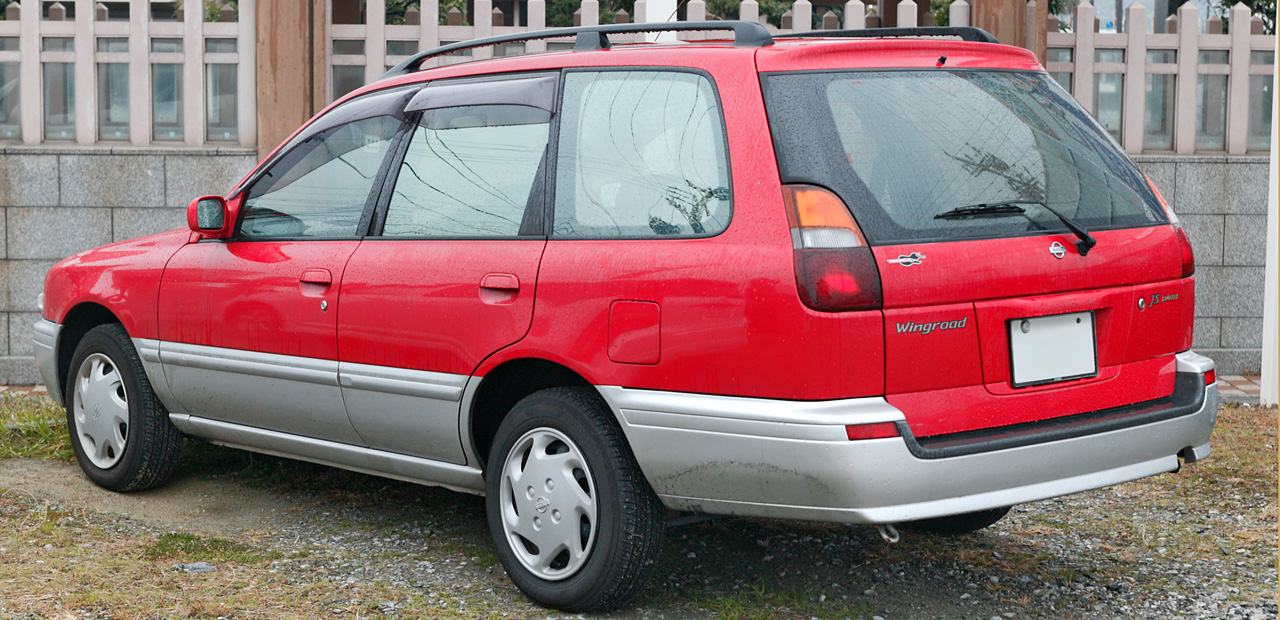
Y10 Nissan Wingroad JS rear

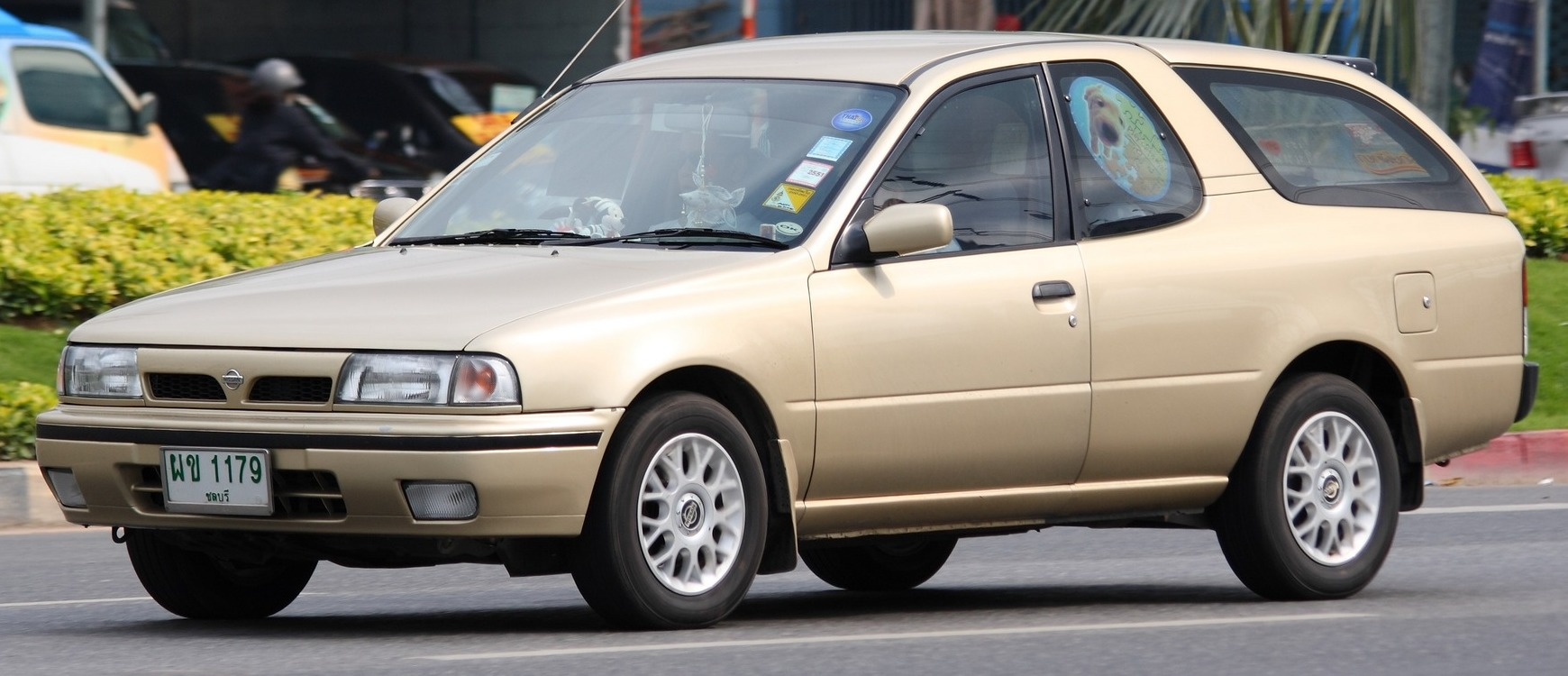
Nissan NV Wingroad (Thailand)

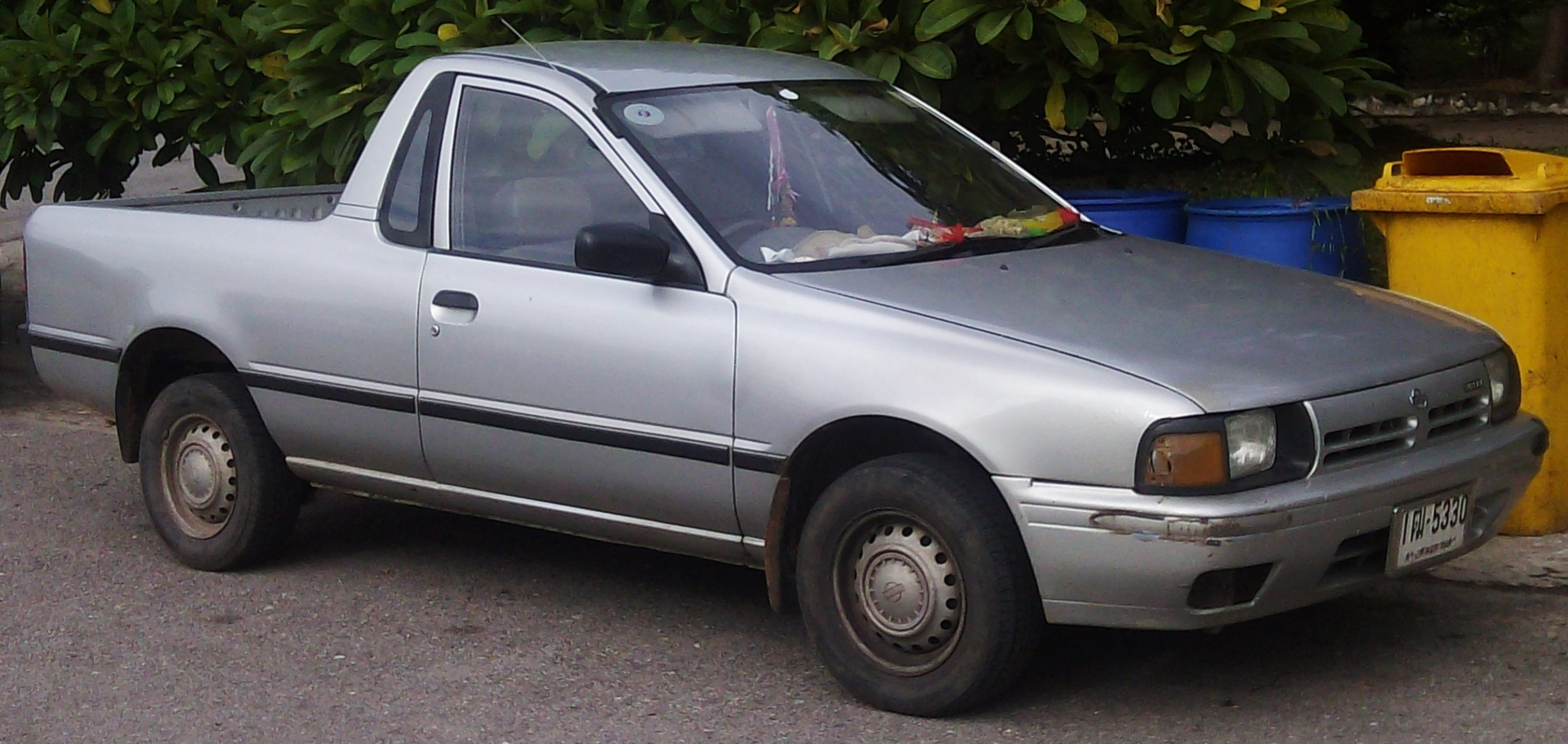
Y10 Nissan NV Pickup

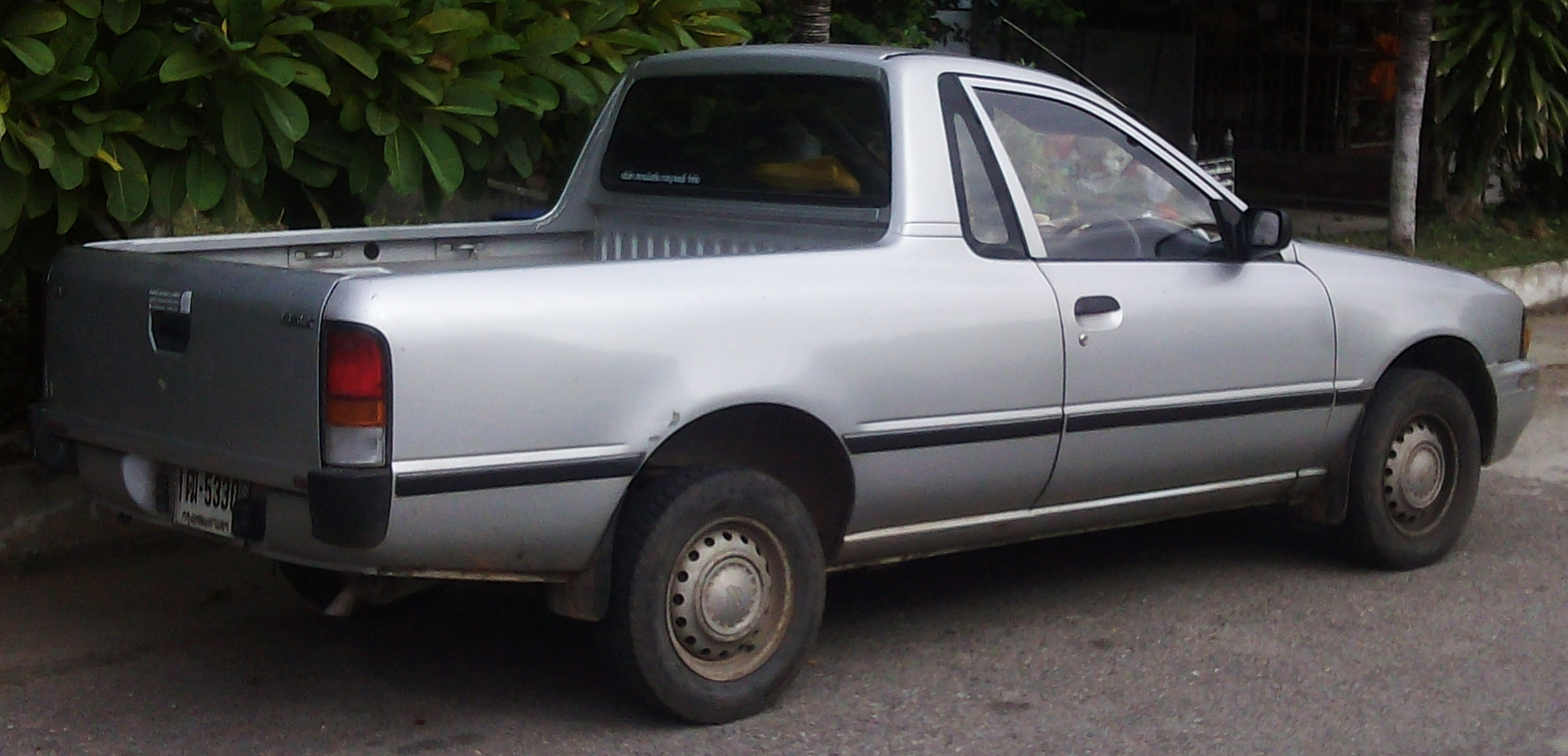
Y10 Nissan NV Pickup

== Y11 series ==
AD Van Y11
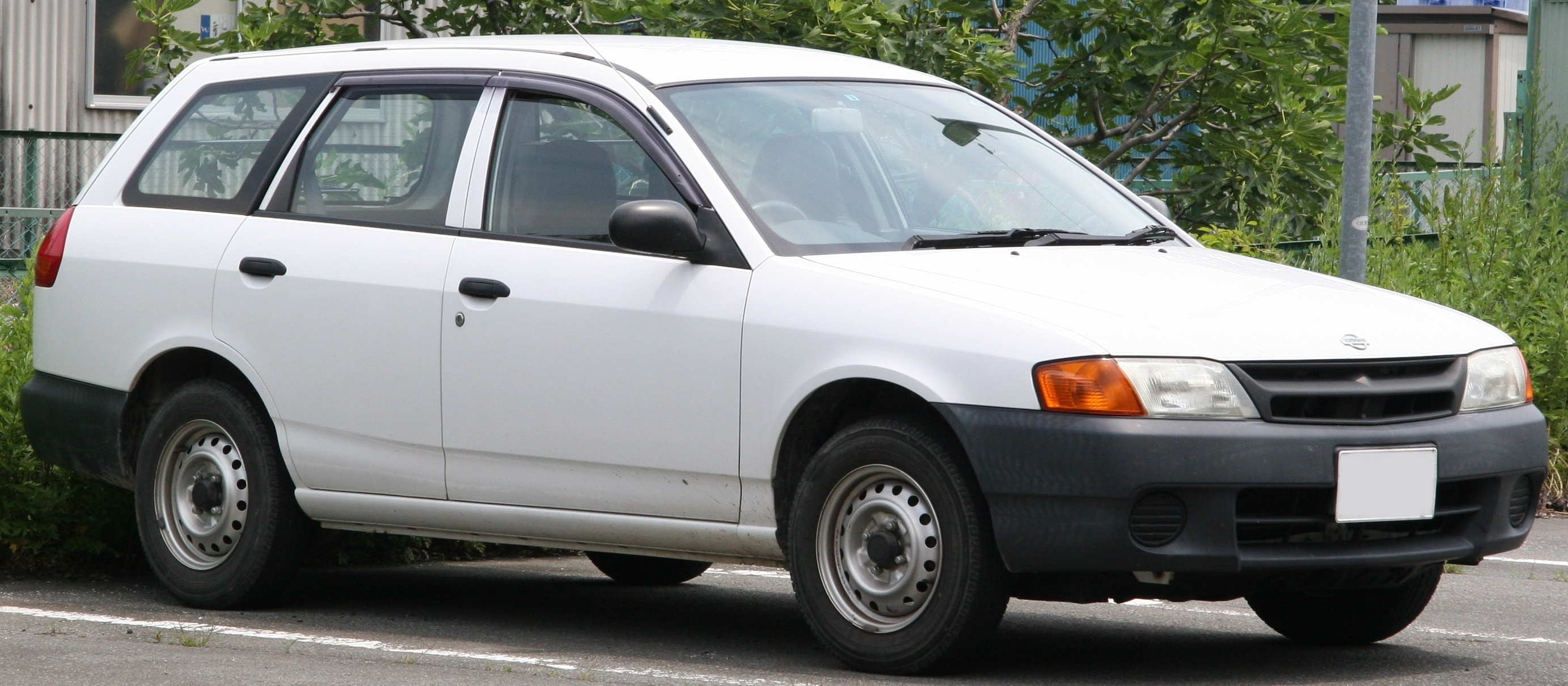
- Pre-facelift Y11 Nissan AD van

Overview
- Also called: Nissan Pulsar Wagon (New Zealand); Nissan Wingroad; Mazda Familia Wagon/Van; Subaru Leone Van (1999-2001)
- Production: 1999–2008 (Nissan AD / Mazda Familia Van); 1999–2005 (Nissan Wingroad)
- Assembly: Japan

Body and chassis
- Body style: 5-door van/wagon
- Layout: Front-engine, front-wheel-drive
- Platform: Nissan MS platform
- Related: Nissan Sunny (B15)

Powertrain
- Engine: 1295 cc QG13DE I4 (Y11); 1497 cc QG15DE I4 (FY11); 1769 cc QG18DE/DEN I4 (HY11/GY11); 1998 cc SR20VE I4 (PY11 Wingroad); 1998 cc QR20DE I4 (RY11 Wingroad); 2184 cc YD22DD diesel I4 (EY11)

Dimensions
- Wheelbase: 2,535 mm (99.8 in)
- Length: 4,410 mm (173.6 in)
- Width: 1,695 mm (66.7 in)
- Height: 1,500 mm (59.1 in)

The third series AD (Y11) began in May 1999, once again available only with a station wagon body, sold in the Japanese, New Zealand (badged as Pulsar) and Caribbean markets. It is mechanically related to the Nissan Sunny B15 series but has a different exterior design. The interior design is shared with the Japanese market Nissan Sunny B15 as well. A driver-side airbag was now standard on both the AD Van and the Wingroad, with a passenger-side airbag optional. The AD Van Max was no longer offered. In March 2001, manufacturing operations were moved from the Nissan Shatai factory in Kyoto to the facility in Shonan.

In August 2002 the AD was facelifted; most notably the bootlid sheet metal was reworked, removing the indentations seen on the initial version, while the grille was also revised. In May 2004 the front turn signals were changed to clear units for the AD Van, along with other minor trim differences. From November 2005, to meet new legal requirements, a side marker light was installed on the front fender – as on European export models.

The AD Van lineup began with the 1.3 L QG13DE, followed by the 1.5 L QG15DE, the 1.8 L QG18DE (4WD only), and the 2.2 L YD22DD diesel engine – also available with four-wheel drive. From January 2000, the 1.8-litre engine was also available in an LPG-powered, front-wheel drive version of the AD Van (CFF-VGY11). The CNG model sold in small but steady numbers; it took more than 30 months (July 2002) for cumulative sales to reach 1,000 units.

Payloads are 300 kg (661 lb) for the 1.3 and 400 kg (882 lb) for all other variants. The AD Van was available in DX and GX models, with additional equipment packages also available. The diesel engine was discontinued after April 2004 as Japan actively discouraged the use of diesel vehicles within its cities.

In January 2006, production was transferred yet again, this time to Nissan's Kyushu Plant. In December, the Y12 series was introduced, mostly replacing the Y11. However, small-series variants of the Y11 continued to be produced until December 2008 as there were initially no four-wheel-drive, manual transmission, or CNG-powered Y12s on offer.

The commercial AD Van version continued to also be sold as the Mazda Familia Wagon and as the Subaru Leone Van (until March 2001). The Mazda version is unrelated to the Familia passenger car range, and kept the Familia name after the car range was replaced by the Axela (Mazda3).

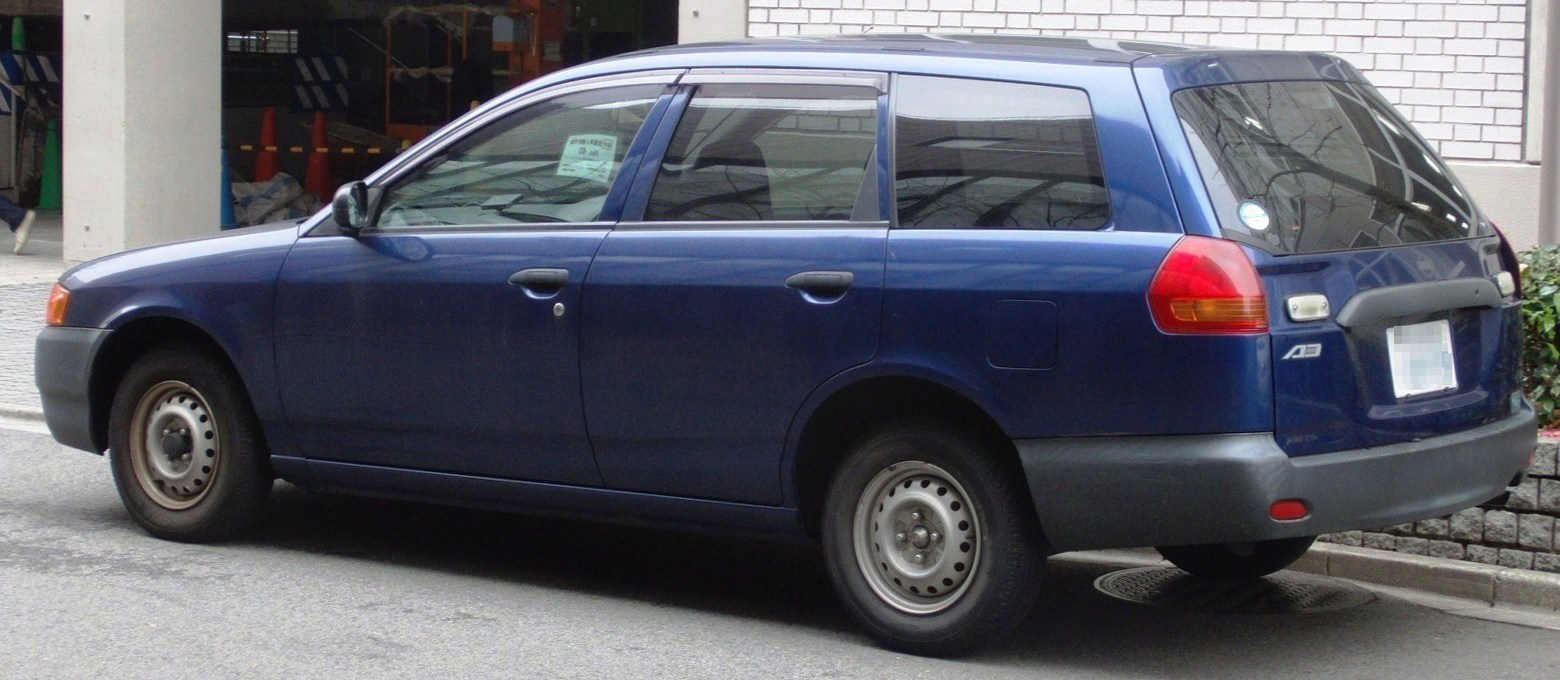
Pre-facelift Y11 Nissan AD van

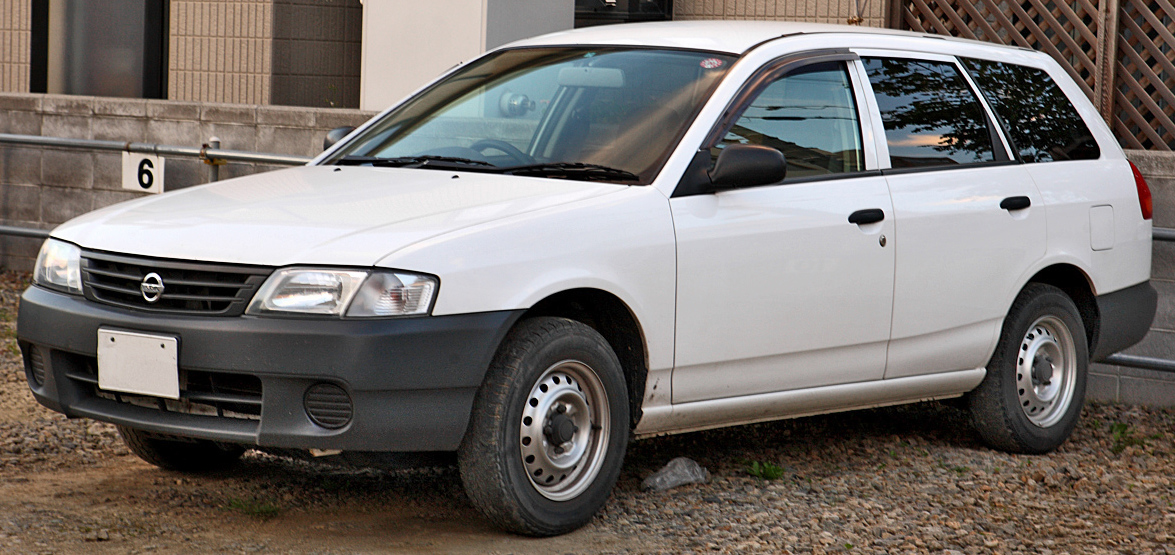
Facelifted Y11 Nissan AD van

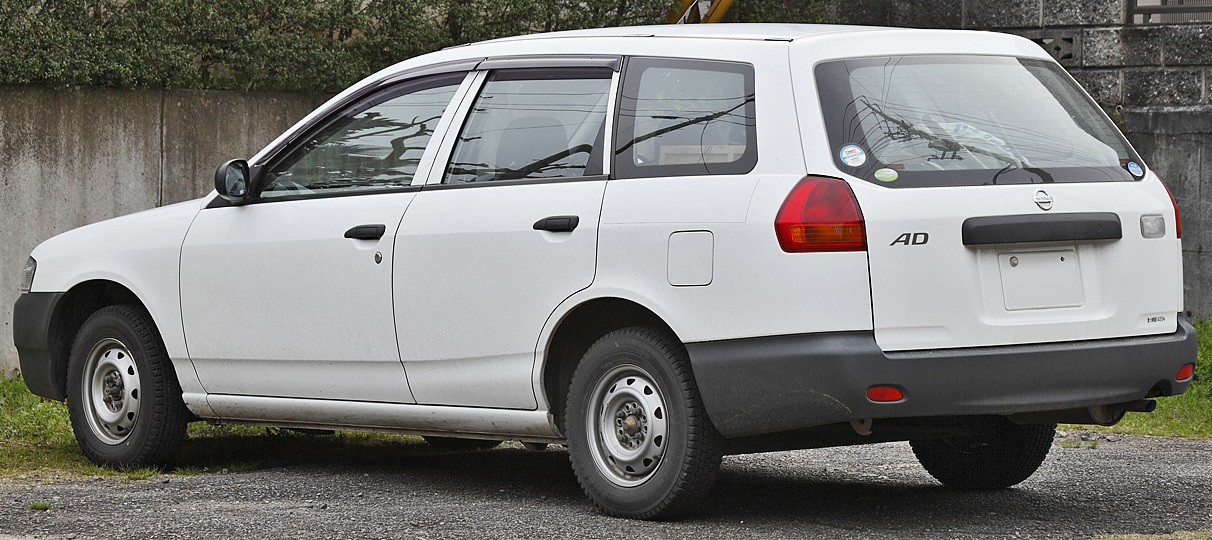
Facelifted Y11 Nissan AD van (rear)

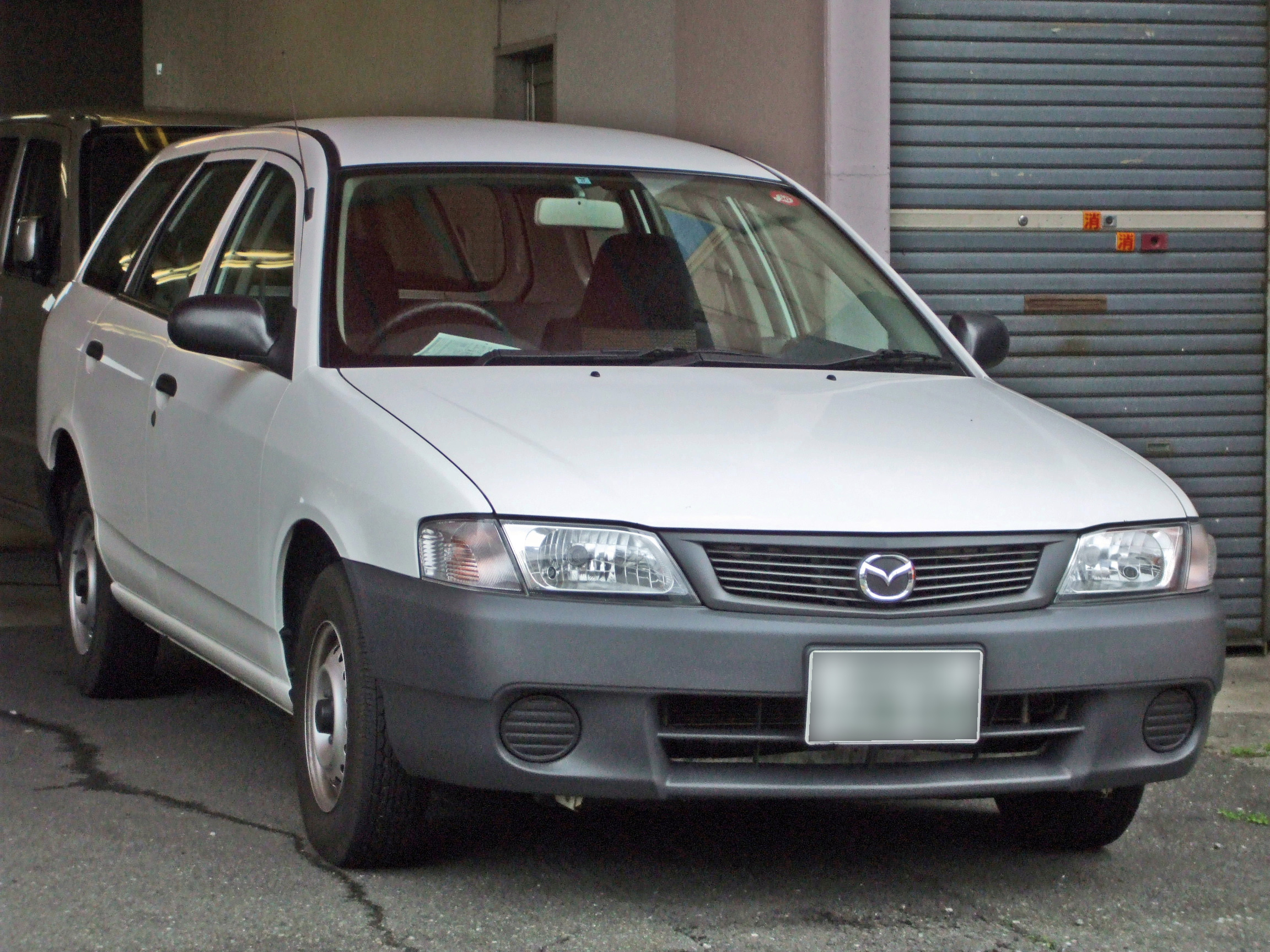
Mazda Familia Van (Y11)

=== Wingroad ===
The Wingroad version slotted in Nissan's product range between the Nissan Bluebird and the Primera, available with the 1.5 L QG15DE, the 1.8 L QG18DE and the 2.0 L SR20VE engines. The 1.8 L exists only as a 4WD version, excepting the LPG-powered Van version. The Wingroad shares a MacPherson strut front suspension with the other Nissan C-Segment cars of the era, such as the B15 Sunny/Sentra and the N16 Almera/Pulsar. In most models, the rear suspension consisted of a beam axle with coil springs and panhard rod. The four-wheel drive versions and the ZV-S FWD variant used a multi-link rear suspension. All variants were fitted with ventilated disc brakes in the front and drum brakes in the rear; the exception being the ZV-S which was fitted with non-ventilated disc brakes in the rear.

From October 2000, the Wingroad was offered as a trim level called "G Extra" that included an optional TV screen that folded down from the ceiling for rear passengers. Various trim level packages were introduced on the Wingroad approximately every six months, including aero packages and limited offering names, such as "Aero Sport Limited".

In March 2001, when manufacturing was moved from Kyoto to Shonan, the Wingroad's 2.0 L SR20VE engine was replaced with the QR20DE. The second generation Wingroad received a facelift in October 2001, with a sleeker front end showcasing Nissan's new corporate headlamp design and a new interior. Production ended in November 2005 as it was replaced by the succeeding Y12 generation.

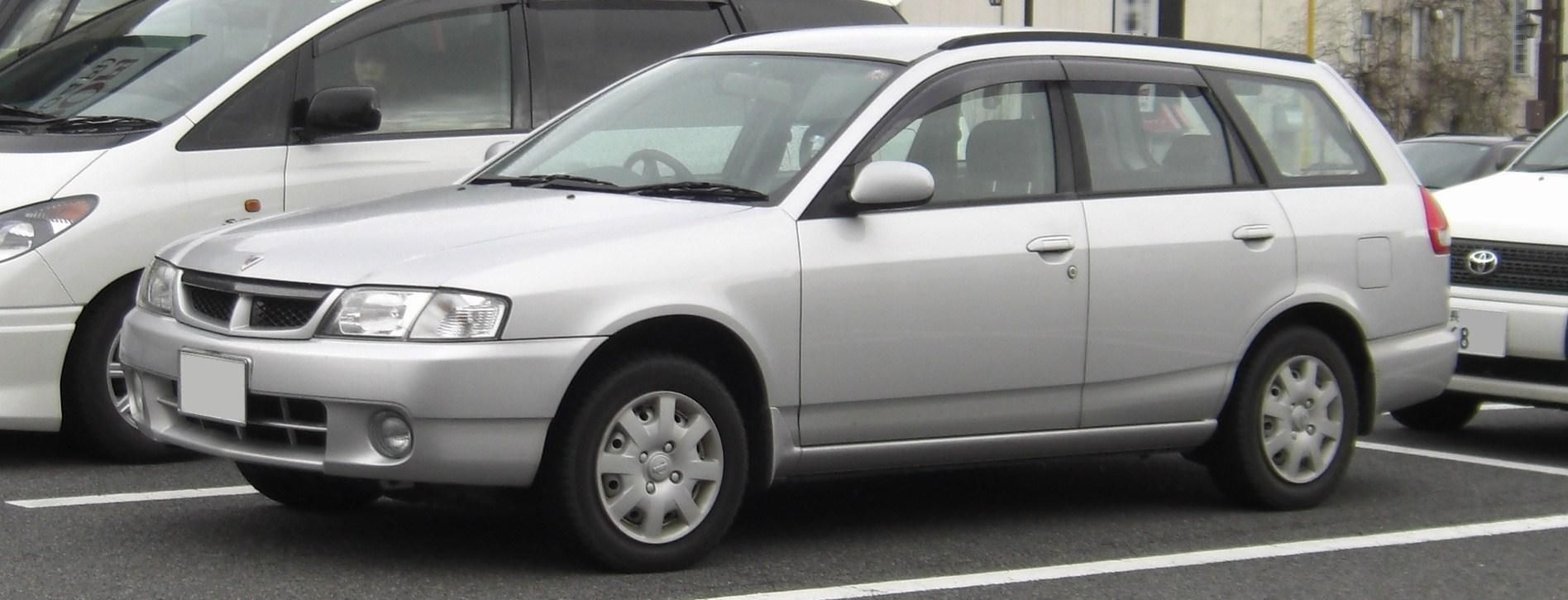
Pre-facelift Y11 Nissan Wingroad

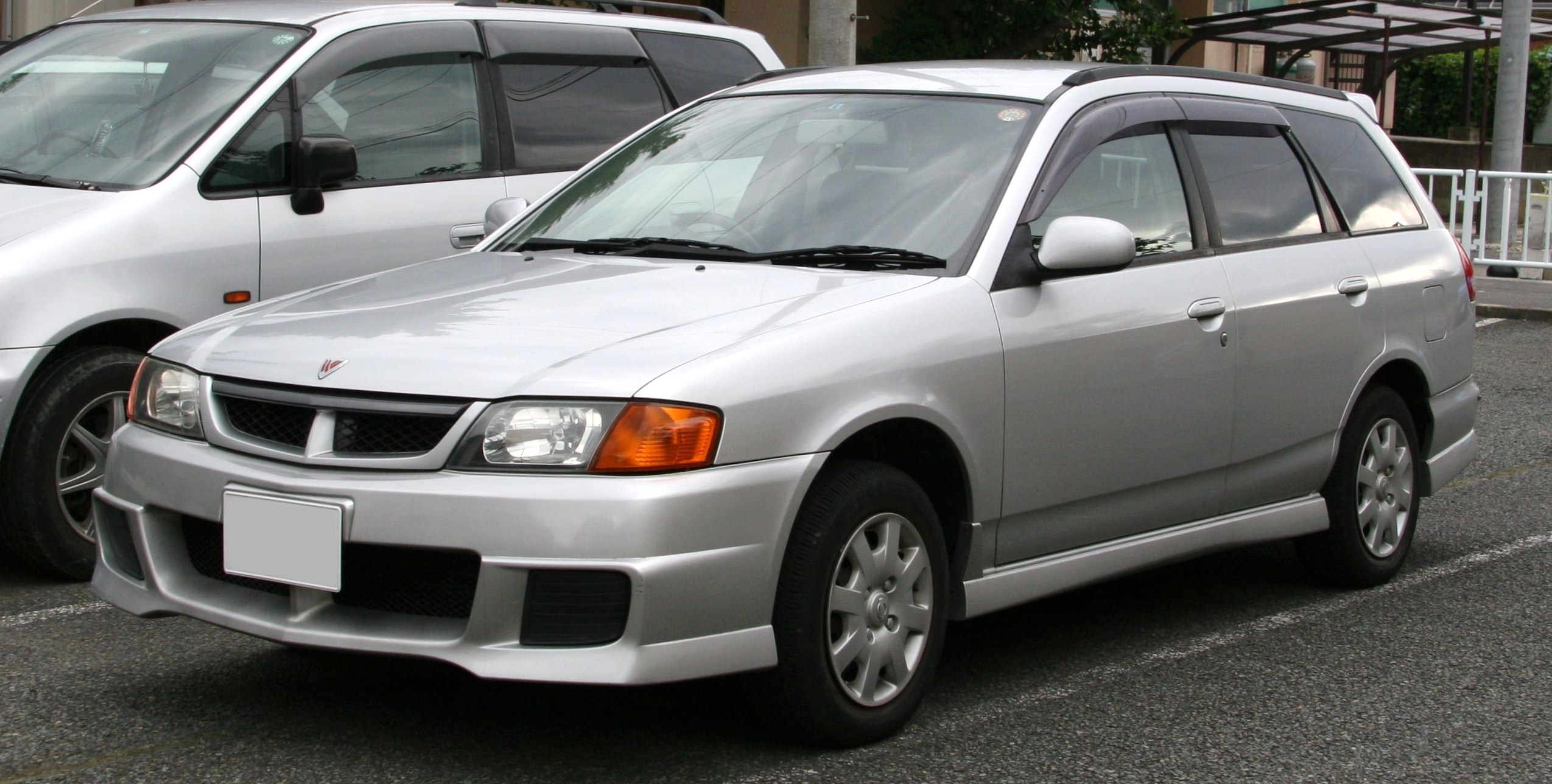
Pre-facelift Y11 Nissan Wingroad Aero

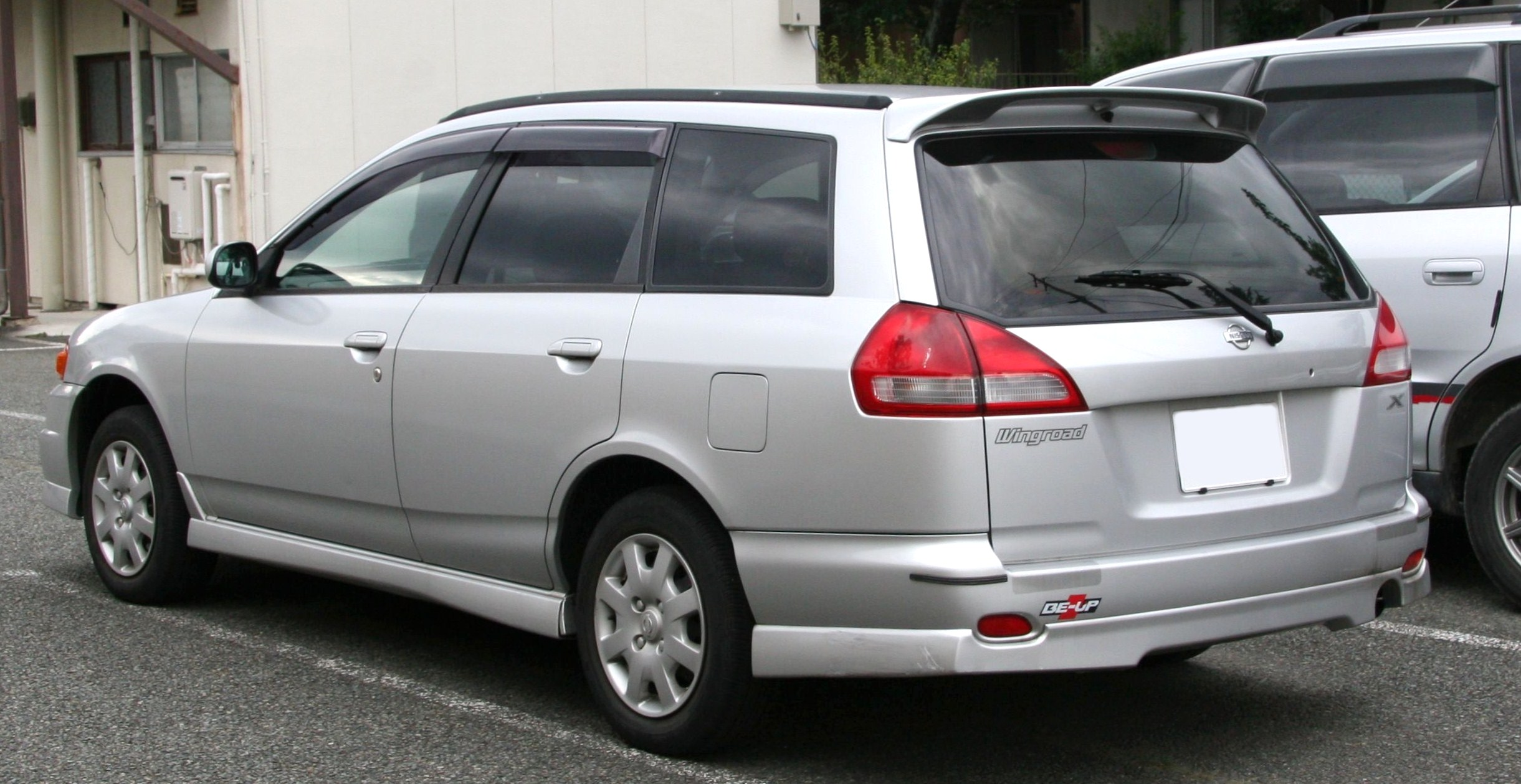
Pre-facelift Y11 Nissan Wingroad Aero

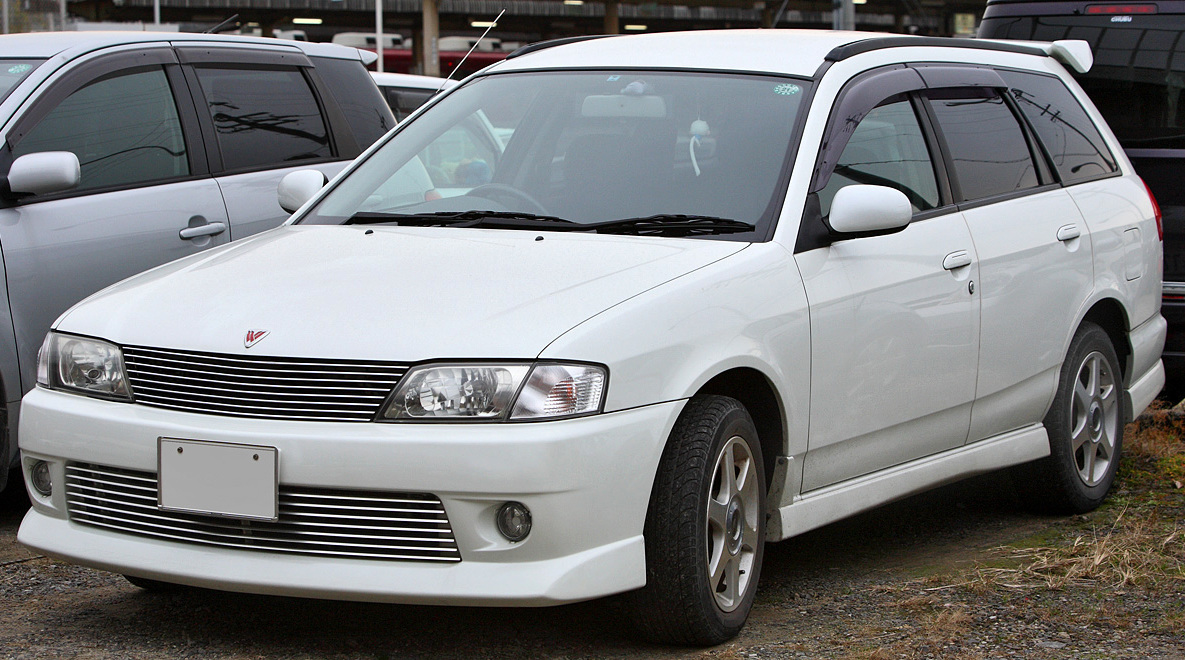
Pre-facelift Y11 Nissan Wingroad Aero Sport Limited

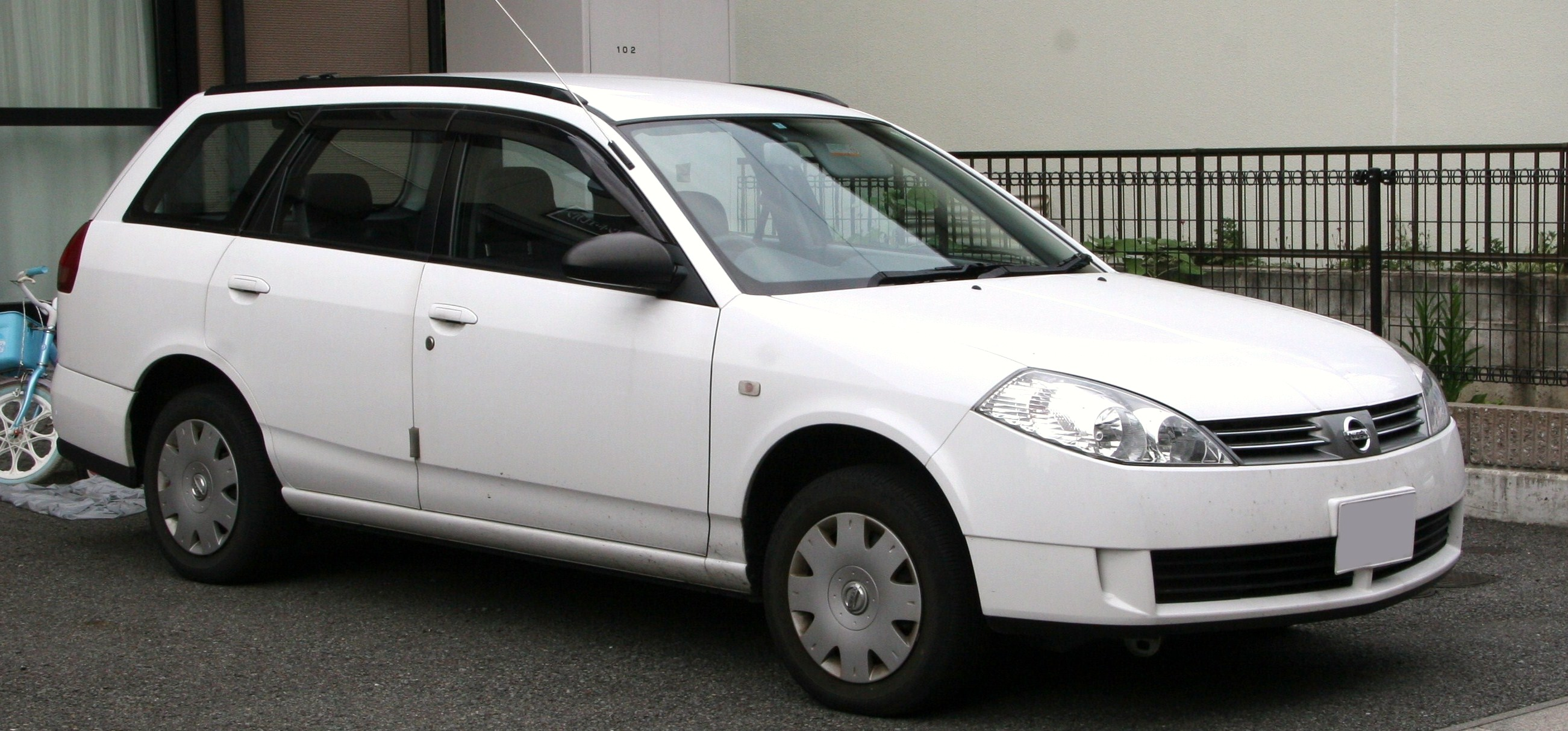
Facelifted Y11 Nissan Wingroad

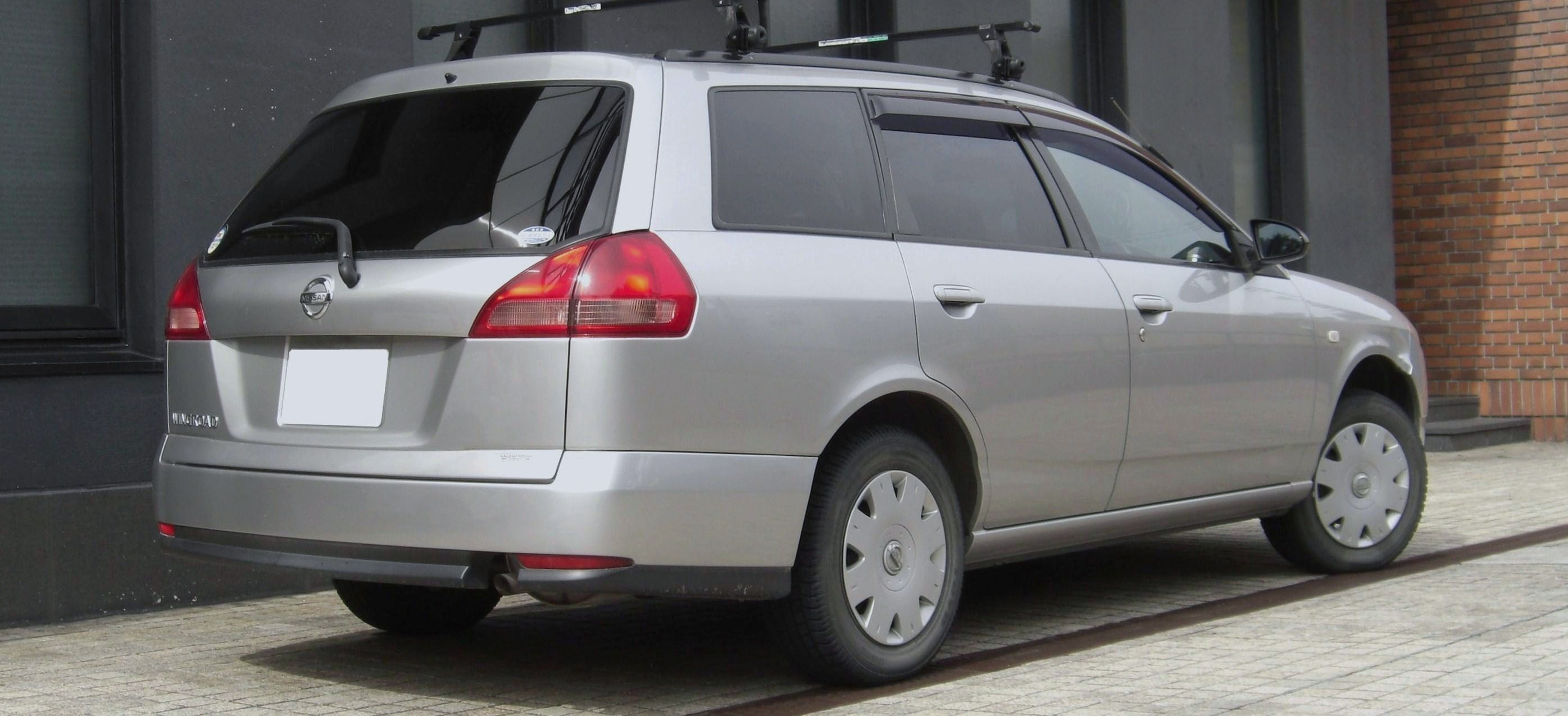
Facelifted Y11 Nissan Wingroad

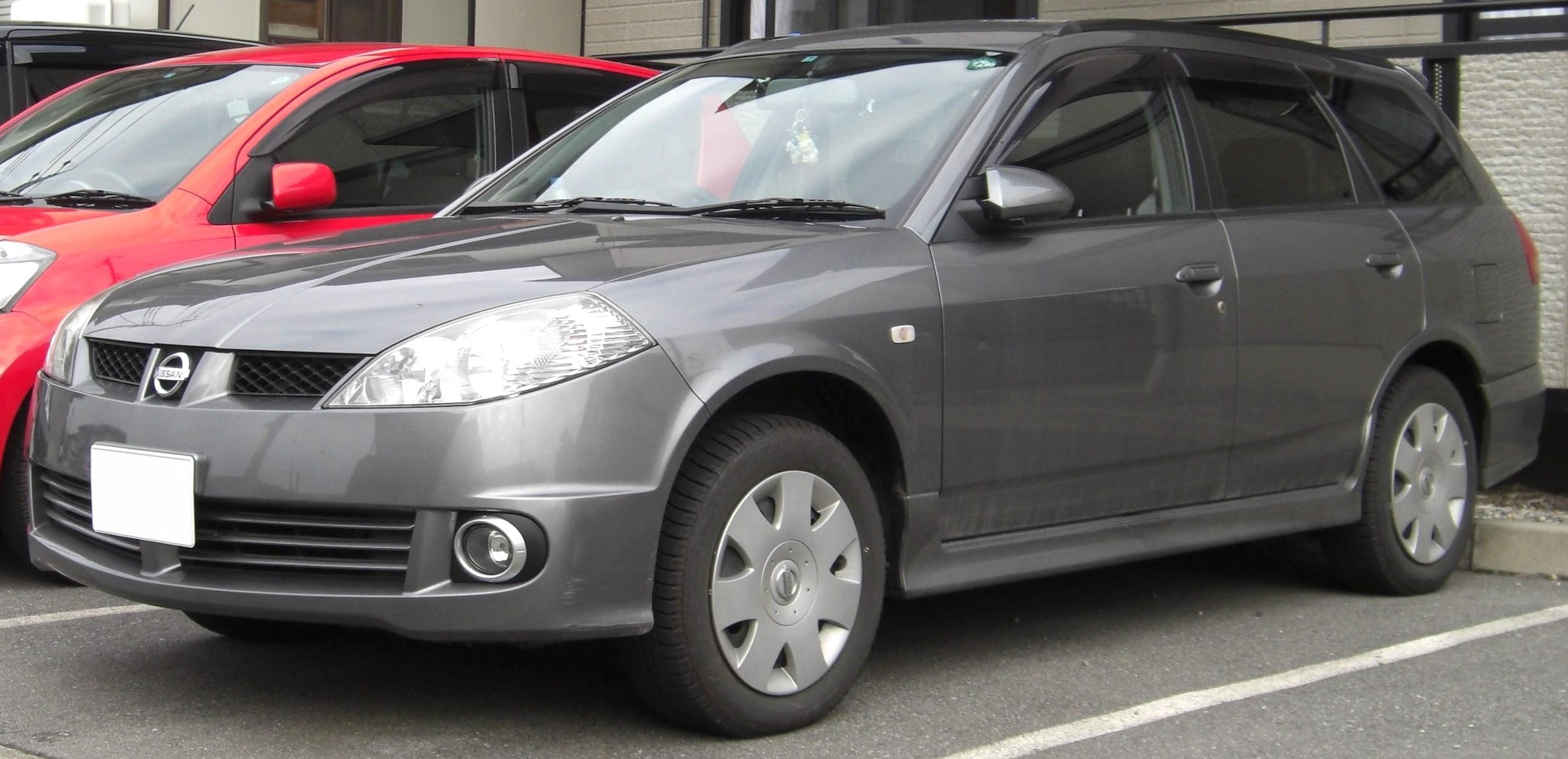
Facelifted Y11 Nissan Wingroad Aero

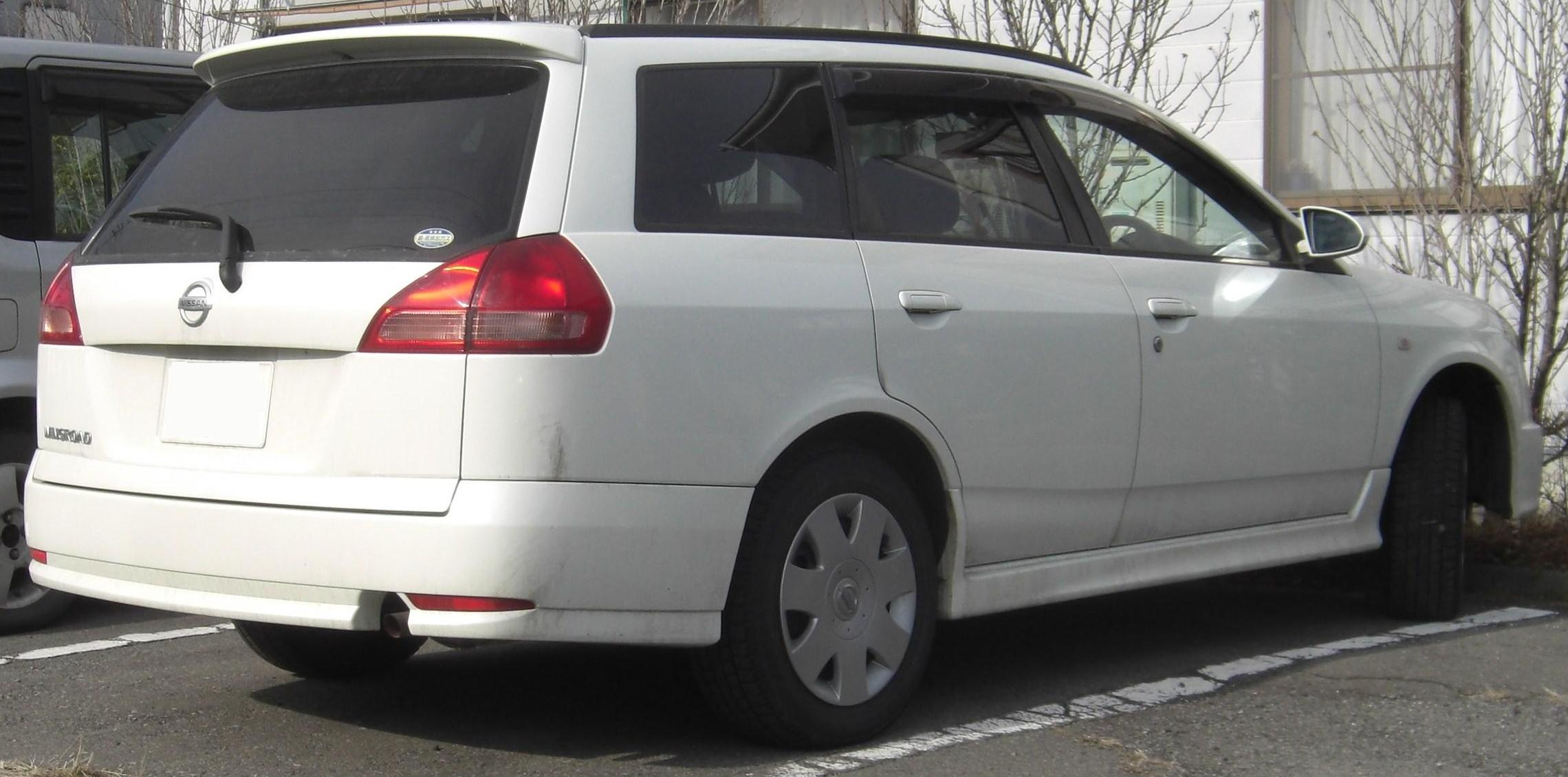
Facelifted Y11 Nissan Wingroad Aero

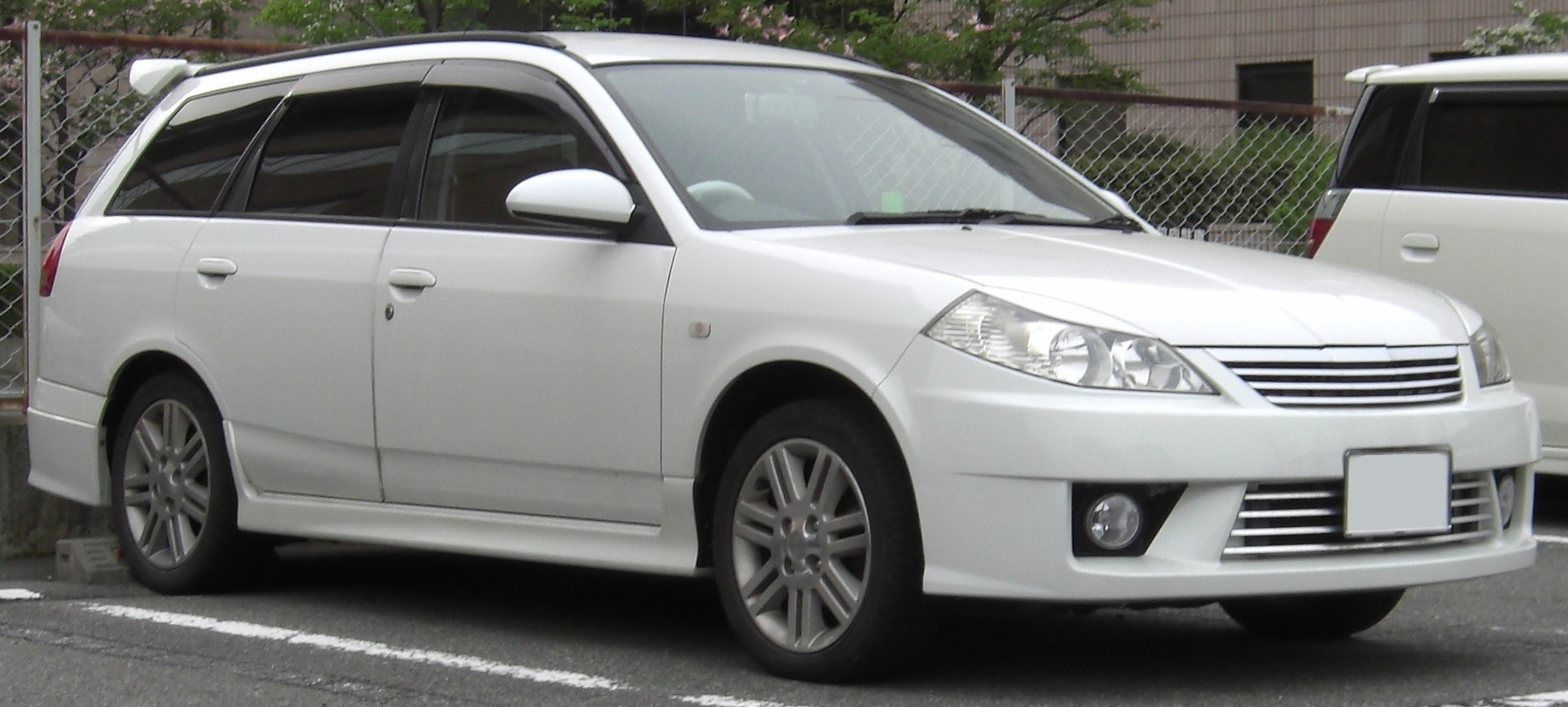
Facelifted Y11 Nissan Wingroad Rider

== Y12 series ==
AD Van Y12
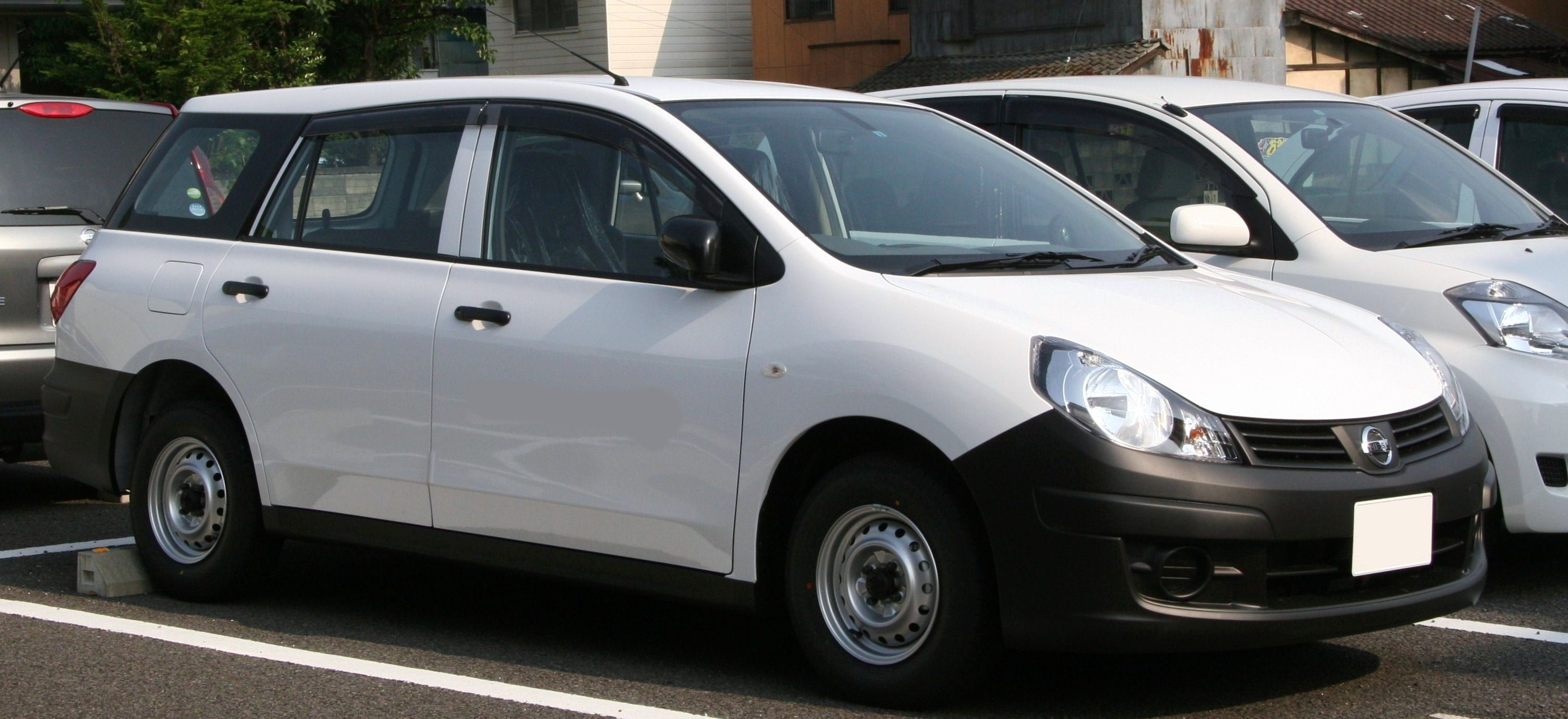
- Pre-facelift Y12 Nissan AD Van

Overview
- Also called: Nissan NV150 AD (2016–2021); Nissan Wingroad (2005–2018); Nissan AD Expert; Mazda Familia Van (2007–2018); Mitsubishi Lancer Cargo (2008–2019)
- Production: 2006–2025; 2005–2017 (Nissan Wingroad & Mazda Familia Van); 2008–2019 (Mitsubishi Lancer Cargo)
- Assembly: Japan: Kanda, Fukuoka (Nissan Shatai)

Body and chassis
- Body style: 5-door van/wagon
- Layout: Front-engine, front-wheel-drive / four-wheel-drive
- Platform: Nissan B platform
- Related: Nissan Livina (L10/L11); Nissan Note (E11); Nissan Tiida (C11)

Powertrain
- Engine: 1.2 L CR12DE I4 (VAY12); 1.5 L HR15DE I4 (Y12/NY12/VY12); 1.6 L HR16DE I4 (VZNY12); 1.8 L MR18DE I4 (JY12/VJY12)
- Transmission: 4-speed E-ATx automatic (1.2/1.6 L); JATCO XTRONIC CVT-M6 (1.5/1.8 L)

Dimensions
- Wheelbase: 2,600 mm (102.4 in)
- Length: 4,395 mm (173.0 in); Wingroad: 4,415–4,475 mm (173.8–176.2 in)
- Width: 1,695 mm (66.7 in)
- Height: 1,500–1,545 mm (59.1–60.8 in); 1,485–1,510 mm (58.5–59.4 in) (Nissan Wingroad)
- Curb weight: 1,140–1,270 kg (2,513.3–2,799.9 lb) (Nissan NV150 AD); 1,180–1,320 kg (2,601.5–2,910.1 lb) (Nissan Wingroad)

Chronology
- Predecessor: Nissan Expert (for AD Expert)
- Successor: Mazda Familia Van (Toyota-based for Mazda)

An all-new AD Van (Y12) debuted December 20, 2006, now using the Renault-Nissan B-platform. The Y12 AD/Wingroad is almost the same car as the European/Japanese 2005-2013 Nissan Note E11 hatchback and the Livina station wagon (Asia). Models fully share their body hardpoints (except for the E11 Note's shorter rear), engines, transmission, suspension, etcetera, while differing superficially in design. Parts are compatible depending on the initial market. A better equipped commercial use model aimed at private users called AD Expert was also available, replacing the somewhat larger, Primera-based Nissan Expert. While not available with the smallest engine, unlike the AD Van, the Expert was offered with a 1.8-litre engine as well.

Payloads are 450 kg (992 lb) for the front-wheel drive 1.5 and 1.8, 300 kg (661 lb) for the 1.2 (AD Van only), and 400 kg (882 lb) for the four-wheel drive 1.6 which appeared later.

The Wingroad debuted November 14, 2005, with a preview at the 39th Tokyo Motor Show in October. Like the Tiida/Versa, it has a wheelbase of 2600 mm, and the new HR15DE and MR18DE engines along with the CR12DE. While the Wingroad was available with 4WD from the beginning, the AD Vans originally only came with front-wheel drive. The transmission for the AD van and the Wingroad is a four-speed automatic or the optional CVT. From 2007, there is also a new Familia Cargo, based on the Y12 shape AD Van. The Y12 was introduced in late December 2008 as the Mitsubishi Lancer Cargo (Japanese: Japanese Wikipedia entry).

The Wingroad received limited edition trim level packages, called "Rider α II", "Sport Acapello", "V Selection" to name a few. When the Nissan Stagea was discontinued June 2007, the Wingroad/AD van was the only station wagon still built by Nissan, with Nissan instead introducing a number of new MPV's, such as the Nissan Lafesta, the Nissan Presage, and the Nissan Elgrand. In December 2008, the AD Van became available with the HR16DE engine and the e4WD all wheel drive system. In the same month, the last of the preceding Y11 series were finally taken out of production; CNG and 4WD versions of the Y11 had been built in parallel for a few years after the Y12 was introduced.

Intelligent Key was added to the Wingroad September 11, 2006, and the Wingroad can be equipped with a GPS navigation package using HDD technology. The AD Van had been sold without passenger side airbag, but from May 2009 this became standard across the range. In May 2013, the 1.2-liter engine option for the AD was discontinued.

The AD Van received a facelift on November 30, 2016, and was renamed the NV150 AD to tie into the rest of Nissan's commercial vehicle lineup. The passenger-oriented Wingroad was discontinued on March 24, 2018. In May 2021, the name was reverted to Nissan AD once again. Specifications were altered somewhat, but the appearance of the car remained unchanged. The AD Expert subvariant remained available, featuring better equipment, black trim on the door frames, and body colored bumpers and door handles.

In January 2025, facing a loss in sales to Toyota's competitors (and to their own kei van, the Clipper) and a need for corporate restructuring with an eye towards the since-cancelled merger with Honda, Nissan announced that AD production would come to an end in November 2025. Nissan stopped taking new orders in May of that year, as the remaining, planned production had been sold out by then.

=== Gallery ===
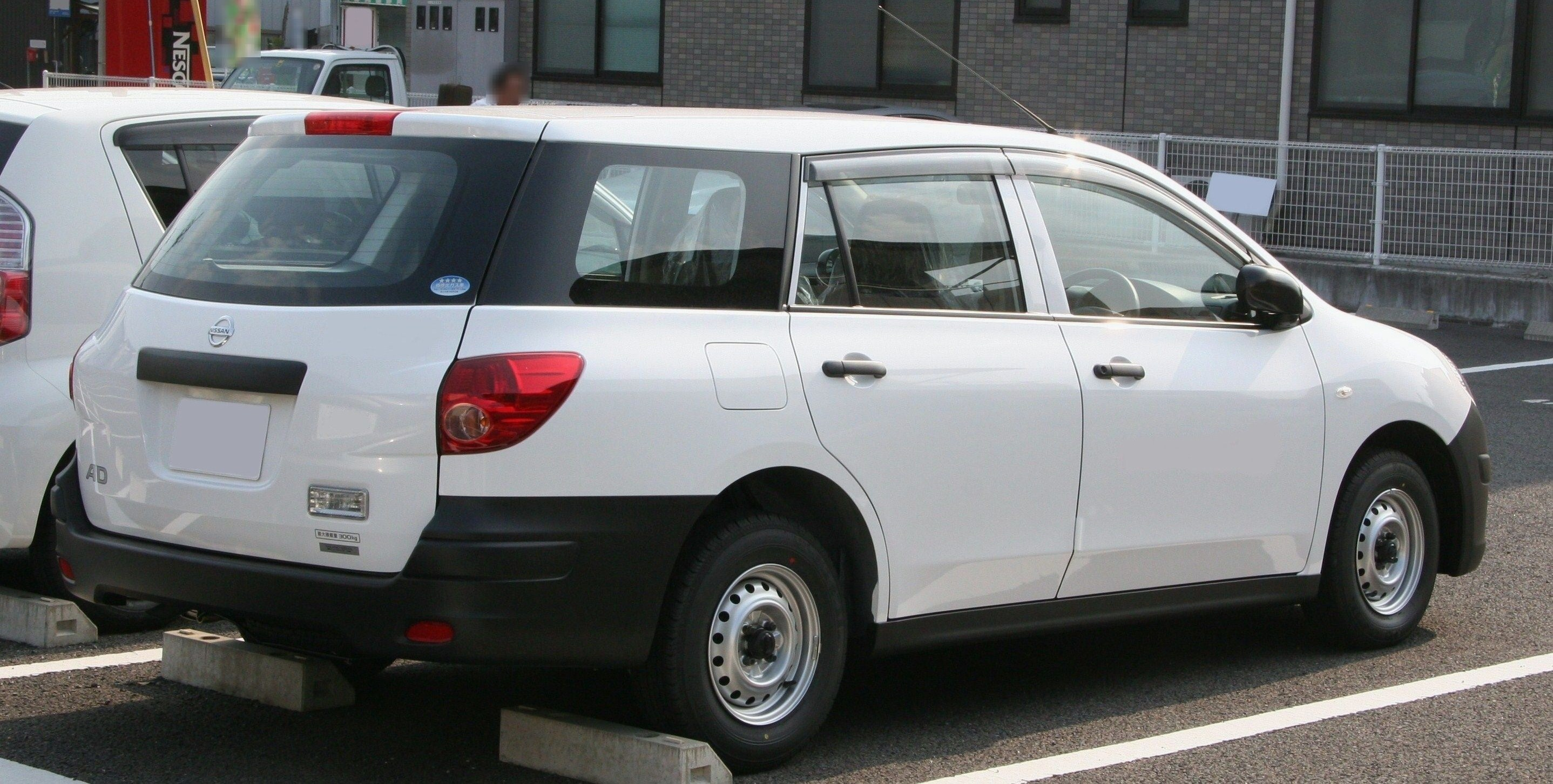
Pre-facelift Nissan AD Van (VAY12)

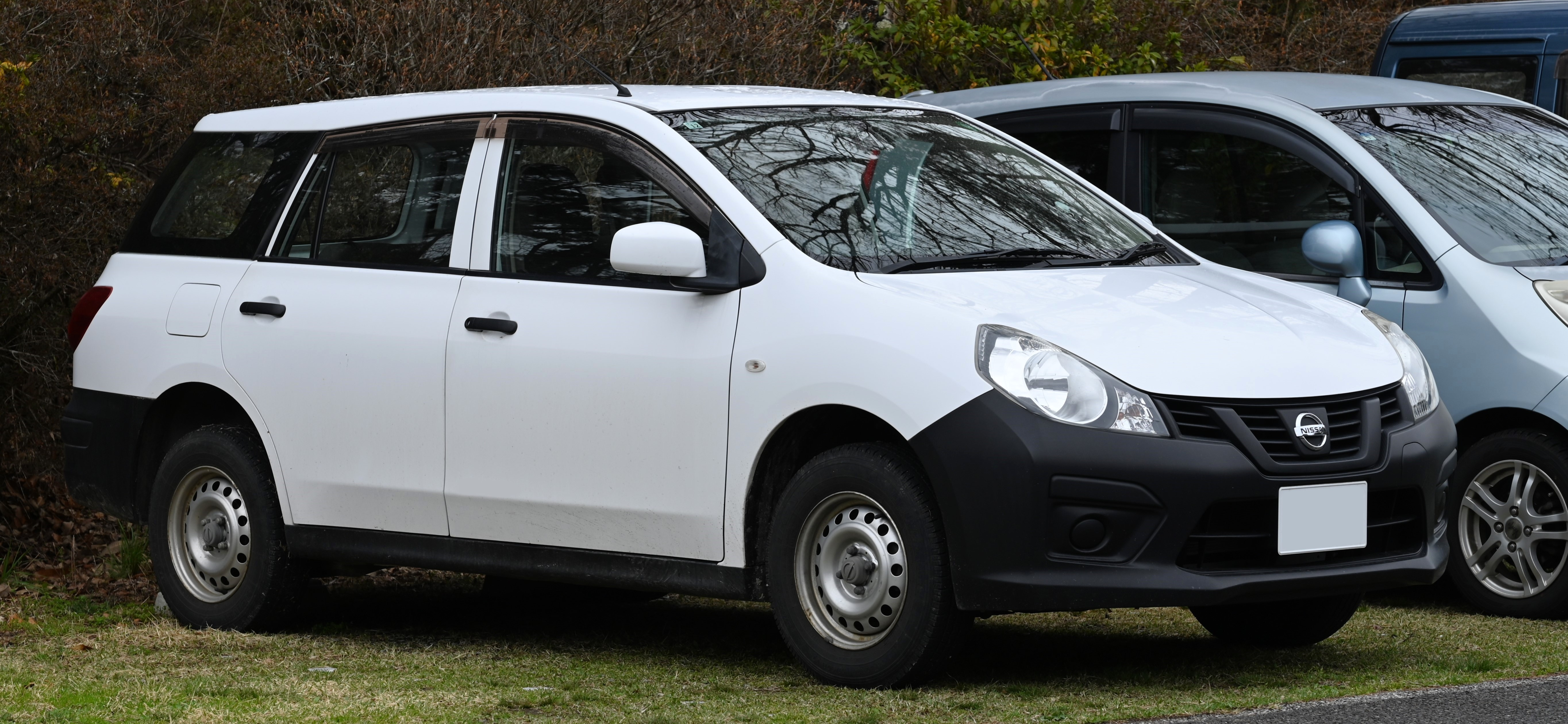
Facelifted Y12 Nissan NV150 AD

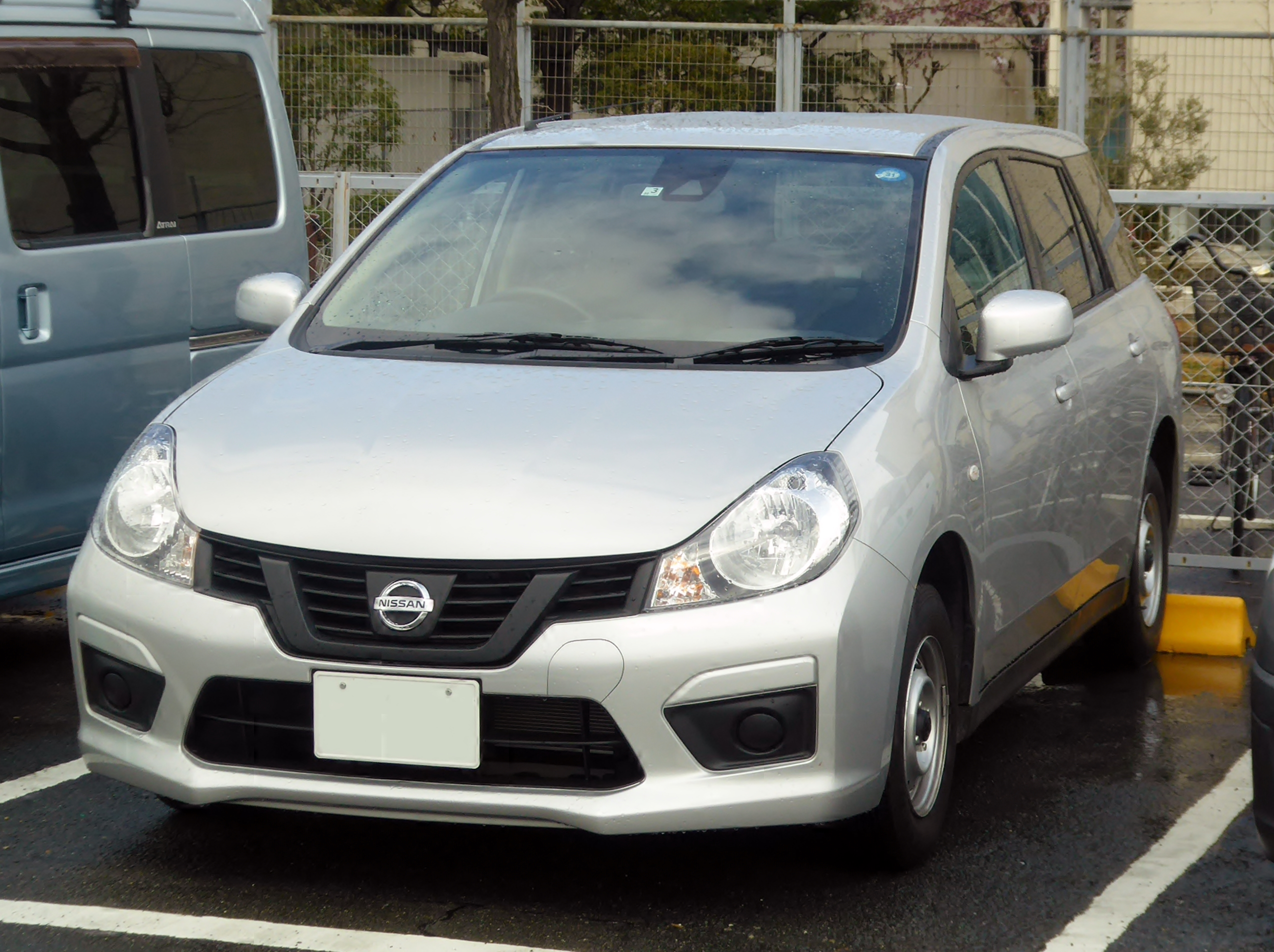
Facelifted Y12 Nissan NV150 AD Expert

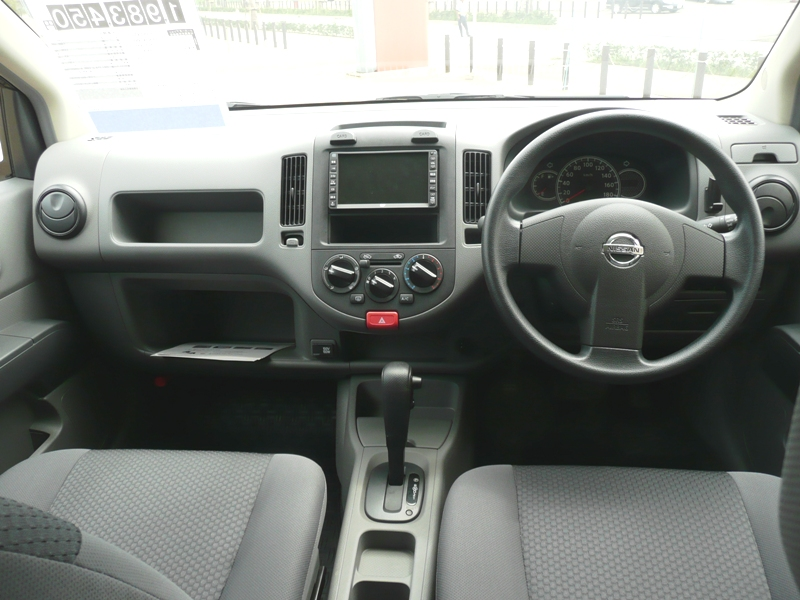
Interior (Nissan AD)

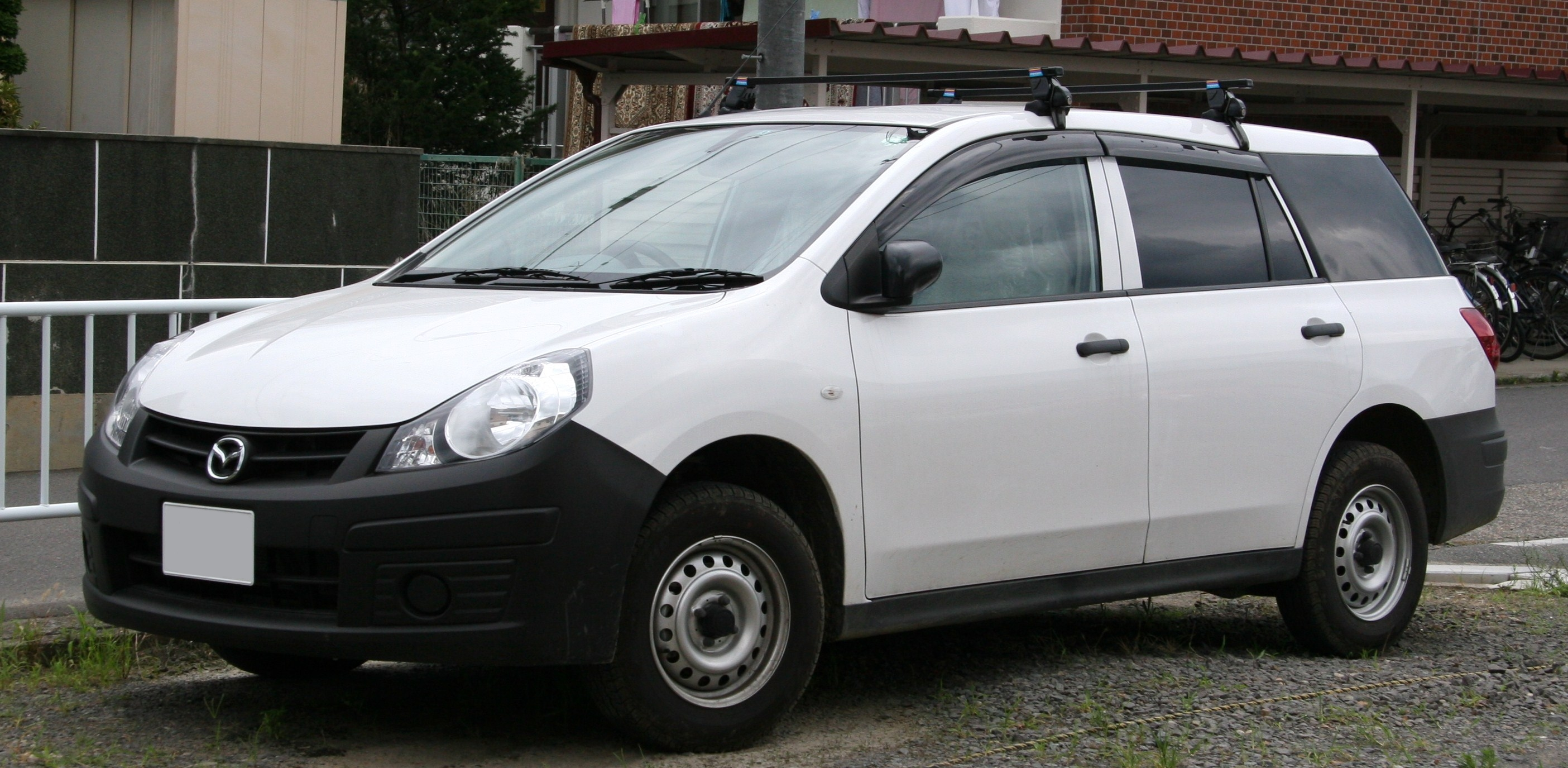
Mazda Familia Van

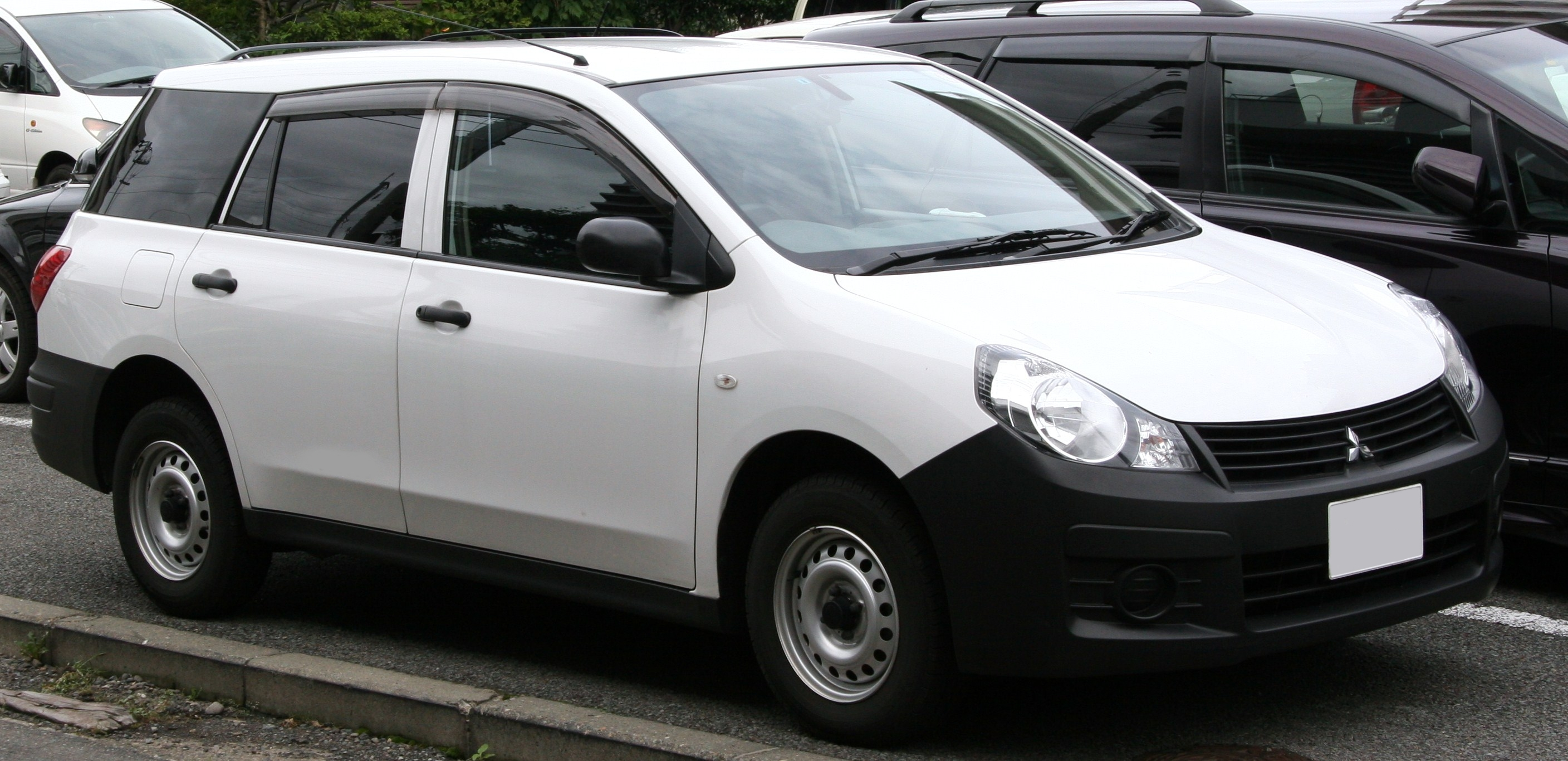
Mitsubishi Lancer Cargo

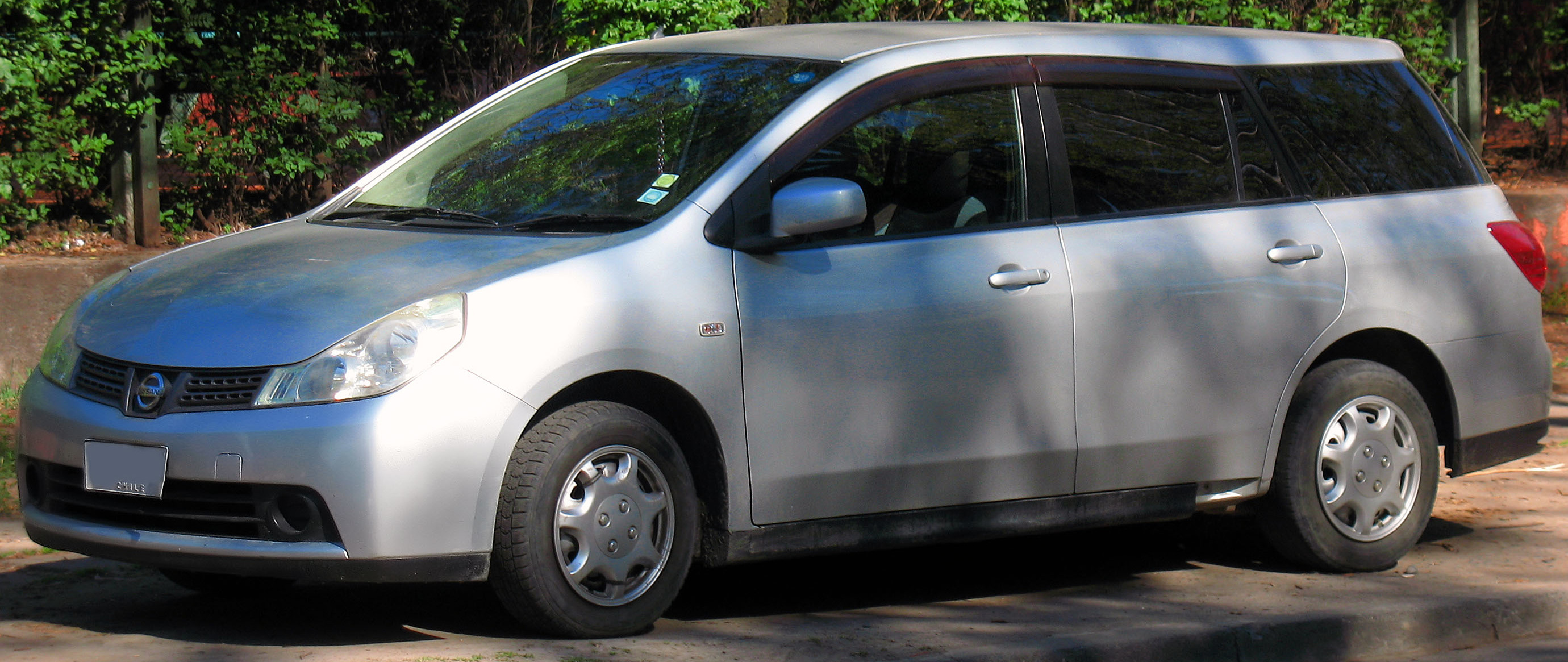
Y12 Nissan Wingroad

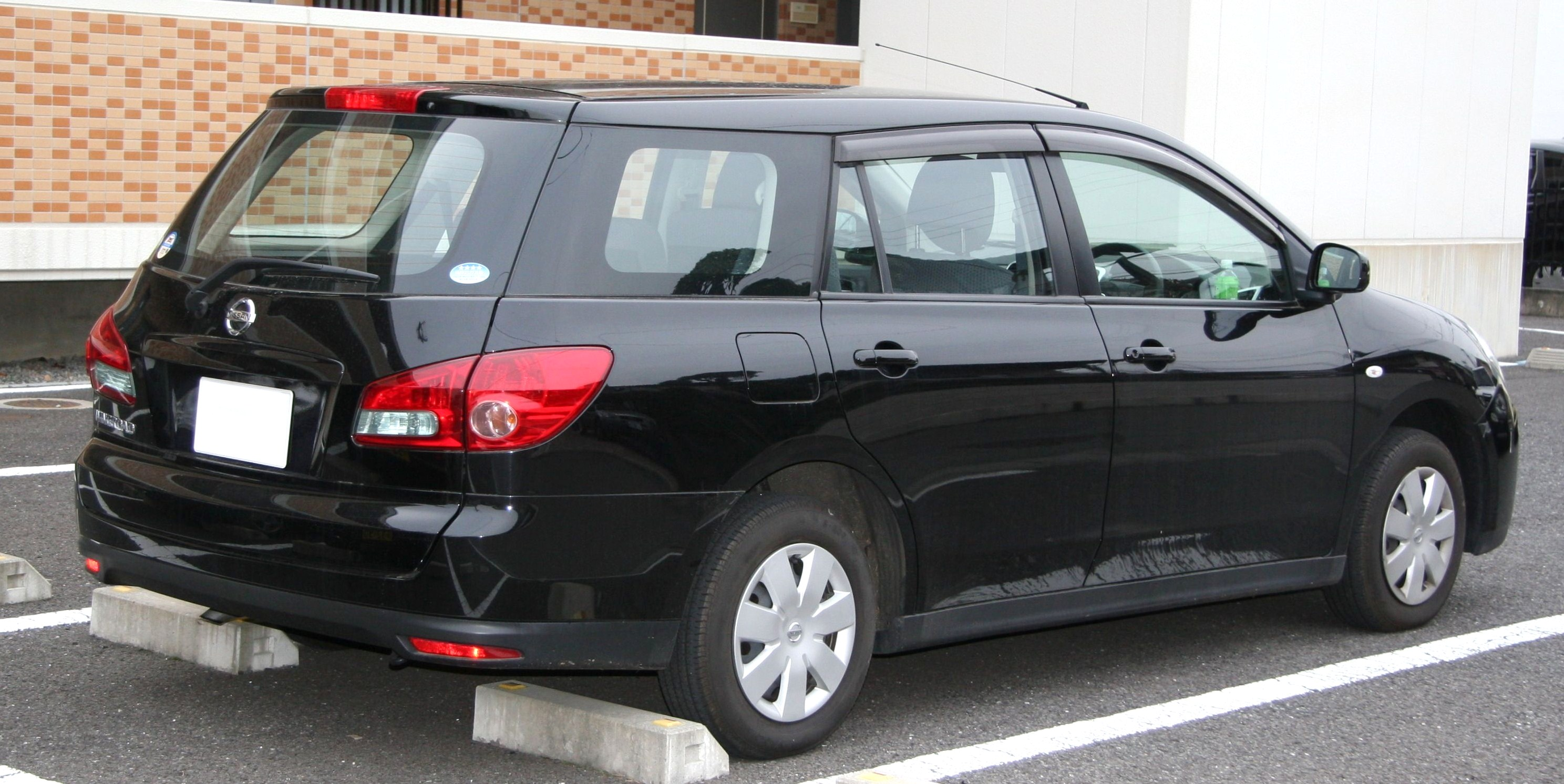
Y12 Nissan Wingroad

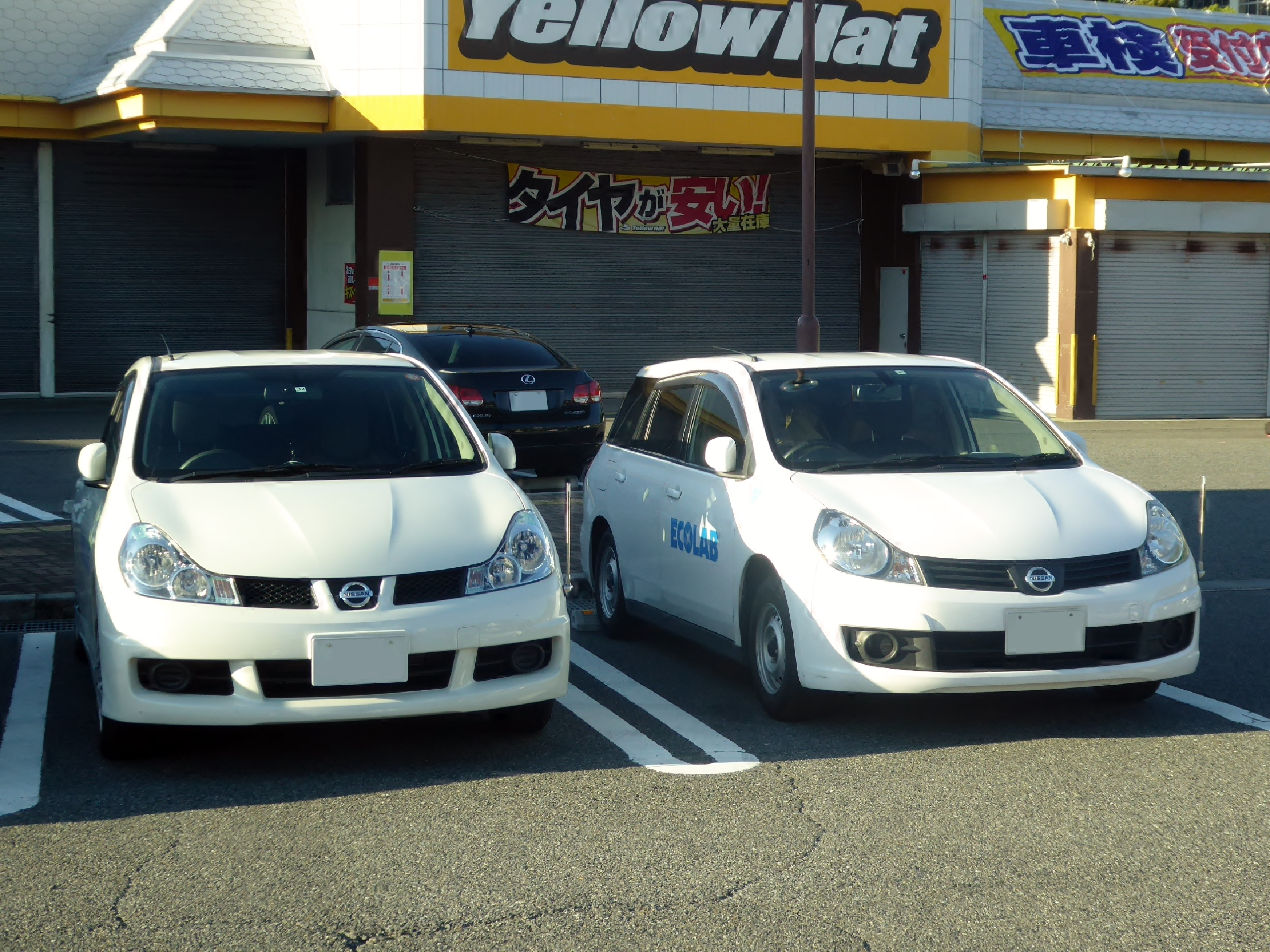
Y12 Nissan Wingroad Aero (left) and Nissan AD Expert (right)

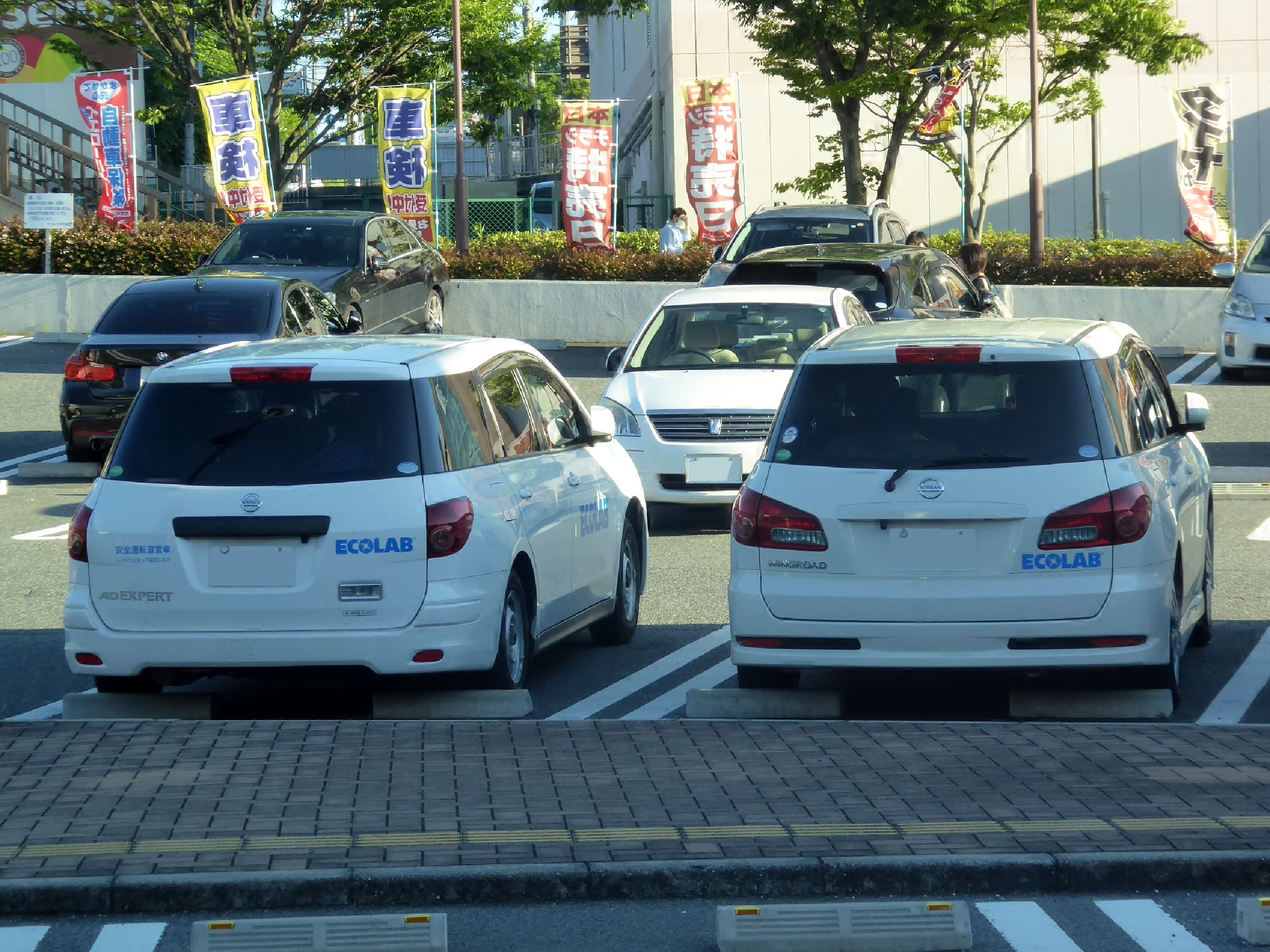
Y12 Nissan Wingroad Aero (right) and Nissan AD Expert (left)

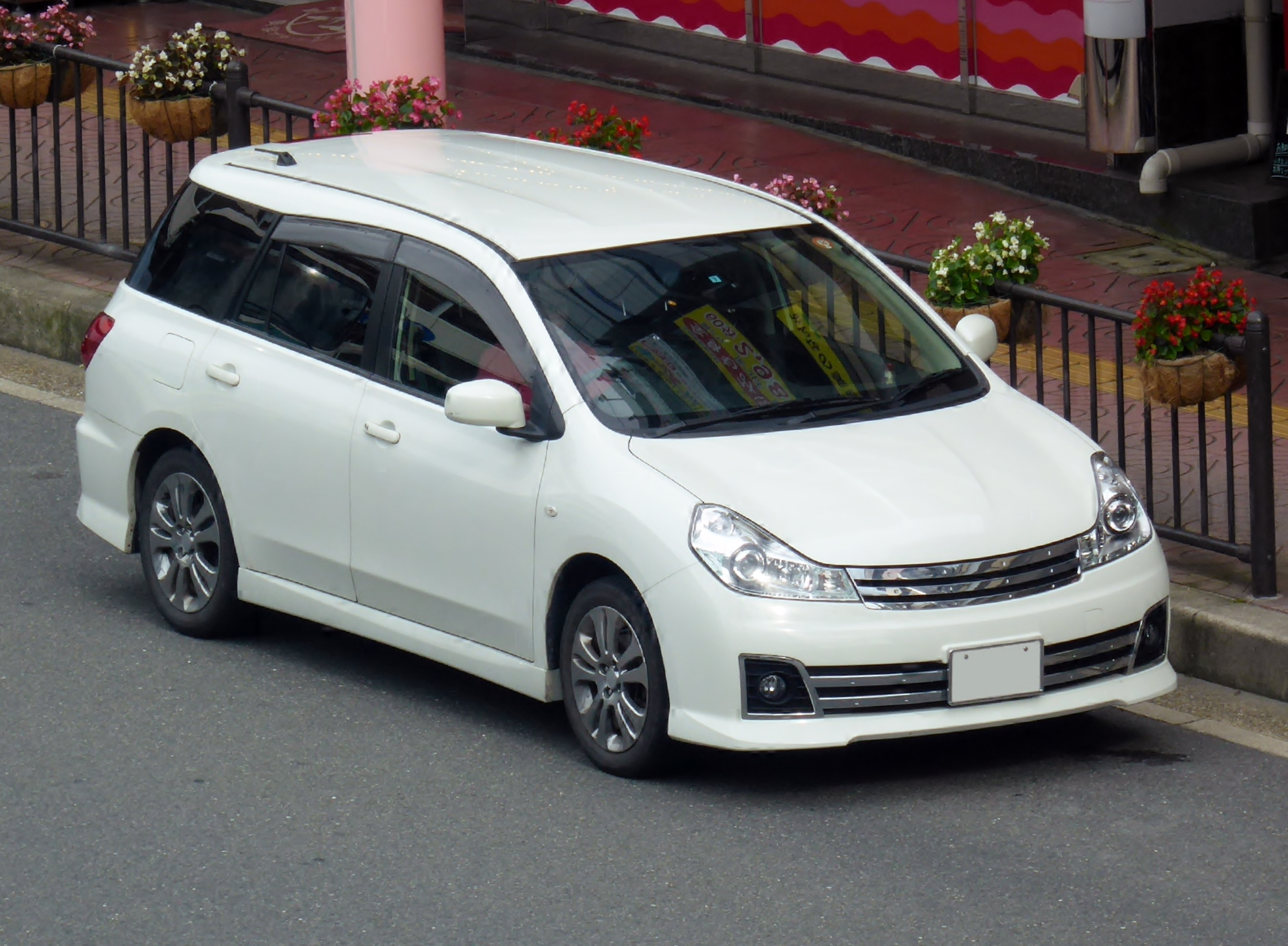
Y12 Nissan Wingroad Rider

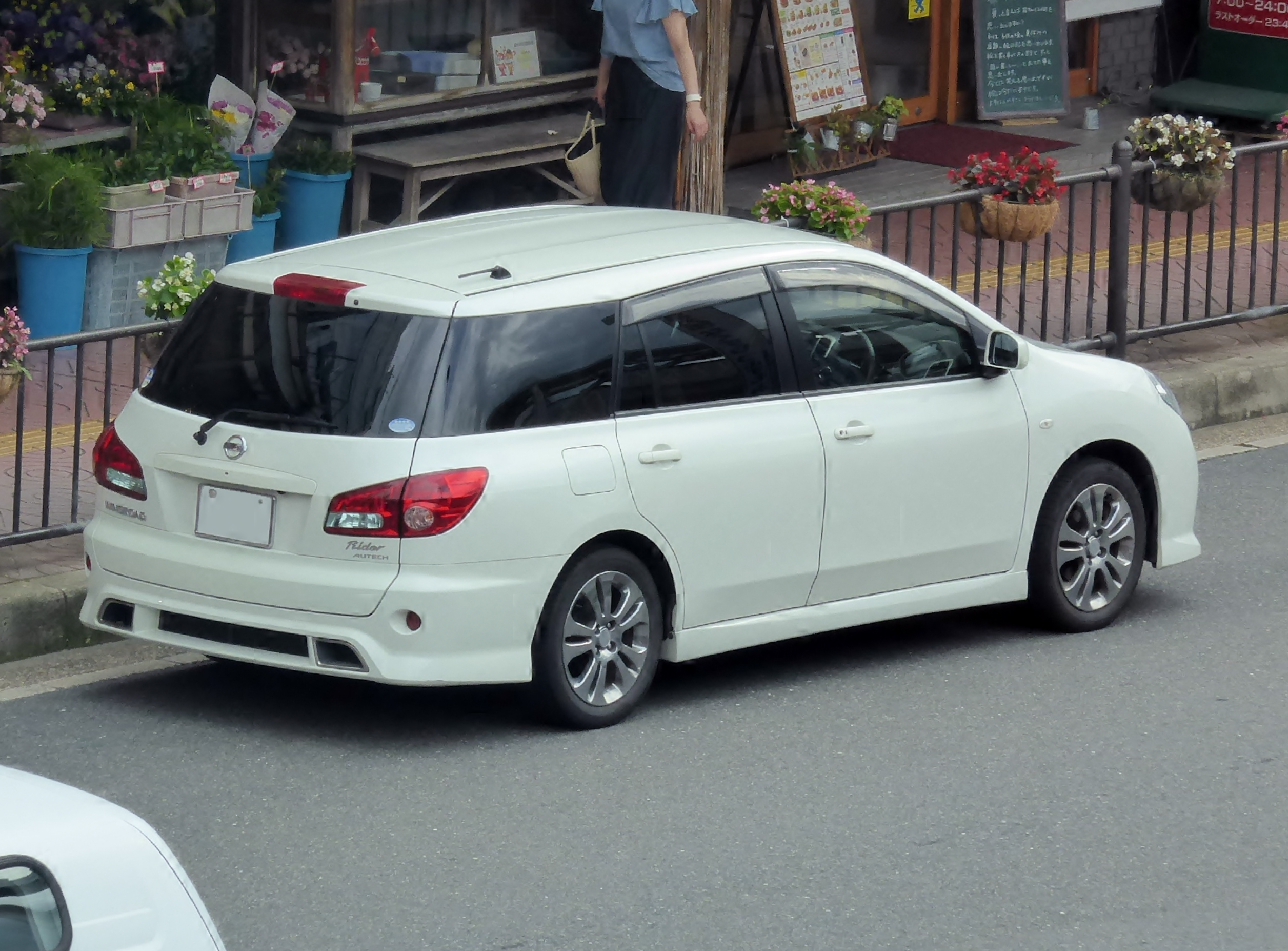
Y12 Nissan Wingroad Rider

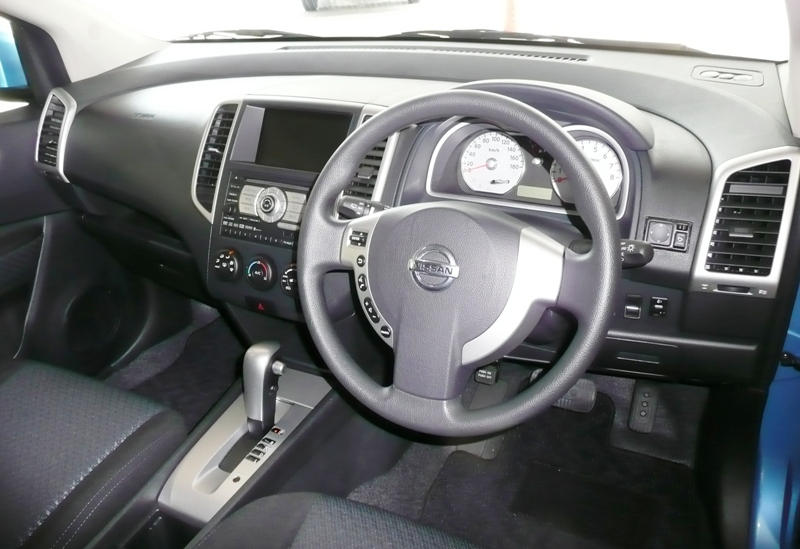
Interior (Nissan Wingroad)
