= Nissan SR engine =

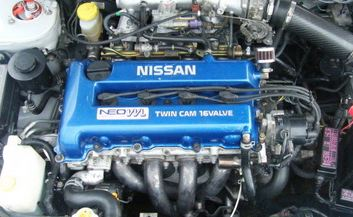
- Nissan SR16VE engine

Overview
- Manufacturer: Nissan (Nissan Techno)
- Production: 1987–2007

Layout
- Configuration: Inline-four engine
- Displacement: 1.6 L (1,596 cc); 1.8 L (1,838 cc); 2.0 L (1,998 cc)
- Cylinder bore: 82.5 mm (3.25 in); 86 mm (3.39 in)
- Piston stroke: 68.7 mm (2.70 in); 86 mm (3.39 in)
- Cylinder block material: Aluminum
- Cylinder head material: Aluminum
- Valvetrain: DOHC 4 valves x cyl. with VVT (some versions)
- Compression ratio: 9.0:1, 9.5:1, 10.3:1, 11.0:1

Combustion
- Turbocharger: Garrett T25G or T28 (some versions)
- Fuel system: Fuel injection
- Fuel type: Gasoline
- Cooling system: Water-cooled

Output
- Power output: From 110 PS (81 kW; 108 hp) to 320 PS (235 kW; 316 hp)
- Torque output: From 150 N⋅m (111 lb⋅ft) to 418 N⋅m (308 lb⋅ft)

Chronology
- Predecessor: Nissan CA engine
- Successor: Nissan QG engine Nissan QR engine Nissan MR engine

The SR engine is a series of 1.6 to 2.0 L (1,596 to 1,998 cc) straight-four, four-stroke gasoline engines manufactured by Nissan from 1987 to 2007. It was part of a new engine family name PLASMA (Powerful ＆ Economic, Lightweight, Accurate, Silent, Mighty, Advanced).

The SR engine family uses a DOHC 4-valve design, with variable valve timing on select models, and is an all-aluminium design with an aluminium head and block with steel sleeves. All SR engines are chain-driven rather than belt-driven, unlike previous Nissan four-cylinder engines.

The SR engine was designed by Nissan as a replacement of the earlier CA series of engines, which used cast iron blocks and timing belts, and was later replaced by the QG, QR and MR series of engines. It was used in many small to medium Nissan vehicles, including various high-performance turbocharged variants.

Power outputs are shown under JIS Net PS or ECE Net kilowatts unless otherwise indicated.

== SR16VE ==
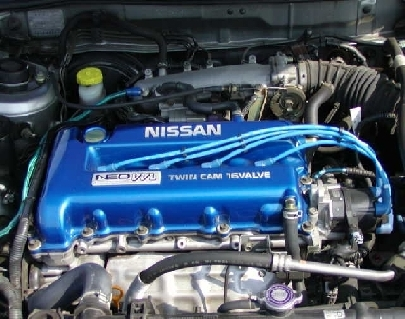
Nissan SR16VE engine

The 1.6 L (1,596 cc) SR16VE has Nissan's Neo VVL variable valve timing with lift control. It produces 175 PS (129 kW; 173 hp) at 7800 rpm and 119 lb⋅ft (161 N⋅m) at 7200 rpm. Redline is at 8300 rpm. Bore and stroke is 86 mm × 68.7 mm (3.39 in × 2.70 in) with a 11.0:1 compression ratio.

This engine was never used on the USDM counterpart of the B14 Lucino, the B14 Nissan 200SX, as it uses the 1.6 L GA16DE and 2.0 L SR20DE engines instead.

It is used in the following vehicles:

- N15 Nissan Pulsar VZ-R
- B14 Nissan Lucino VZ-R
- B15 Nissan Sunny VZ-R

=== SR16VE N1 ===
This version was used in the limited-production Pulsar VZ-R N1, produced from 1997 to 1998. These cars were tuned by Autech Japan. It made 200 PS (197 hp; 147 kW) at 7800 rpm and 134 lb⋅ft (182 N⋅m) at 7600 rpm. Redline of the N1 Version 2 (1998) is at 8600 rpm. This is also claimed to be the most powerful production 1.6 L naturally aspirated engine.

== SR18Di ==
The SR18Di is a 1.8 L (1,838 cc) DOHC engine. It produces 110 PS (108 hp; 81 kW) at 6500 rpm and 150 N⋅m (111 lb⋅ft) at 4000 rpm. Based on the Single Point Fuel Injection system, it was installed on JDM cars and some UK versions. This model used some cast iron blocks and it was used on the P10 generation Nissan Primera, but due to the low overall power this engine option was dropped on the next generation.

This engine was never used on the USDM counterpart of the P10/11 Primera, the Infiniti G20, as it uses the 2.0 L SR20DE engine instead.

It is used in the following vehicles:

- 1990-1993 Nissan Primera
- Nissan Sunny
- Nissan Bluebird U12
- Nissan Avenir W10

== SR18DE ==
The SR18DE is a 1.8 L (1,838 cc) DOHC engine. It produces 125 PS (123 hp; 92 kW) at 6000 rpm and 156 N⋅m (115 lb⋅ft) at 4800 rpm. This engine came with Multi Point Fuel Injection System ECCS (Electronic Concentrated Control System). The SR18DE crankshaft was produced with four fewer counterweights than the SR20DE variants, which have eight, for lighter weight and better fuel efficiency. These lightweight crankshafts were also homologated for use in the Japanese N2 Silvia racing program and later used in the SR20VE engine.

This engine was never used on the USDM counterpart of the P10/11 Primera, the Infiniti G20, as it uses the 2.0 L SR20DE engine instead.

It is used in the following vehicles:

- 1991-1997 Nissan Primera
- Nissan Sunny
- Nissan Avenir W10
- Nissan Rasheen
- 1991-1997 Nissan Bluebird U13
- 1989-1998 Nissan Bluebird U14 119 PS (117 hp; 88 kW) Factory detuning and refining of fuel injection.
- 1990-1993 Nissan Pulsar GTi B13 and N14, 140 PS (138 hp; 103 kW) at 6400 rpm and 167 N⋅m (123 lb⋅ft) at 4800 rpm
- 1991-1999 Nissan Pulsar GTi N15, 140 PS (138 hp; 103 kW) at 6400 rpm and 167 N⋅m (123 lb⋅ft) at 4800 rpm
- 1989(??)-2001 Nissan Presea 125 PS (123 hp; 92 kW)

== SR20Di ==
The SR20Di is a 2.0 L (1,998 cc) DOHC engine. It produces 116 PS (114 hp; 85 kW). Bore and stroke are 86 mm × 86 mm (3.39 in × 3.39 in). Similar to the 1.8 liter version except for bigger displacement with a throttle body injection system.

This engine was never used on the USDM counterpart of the P10/11 Primera, the Infiniti G20, as it uses the 2.0 L SR20DE engine instead.

It is used in the following vehicles:

- 1991–1994.6 Nissan Primera

== SR20DE ==
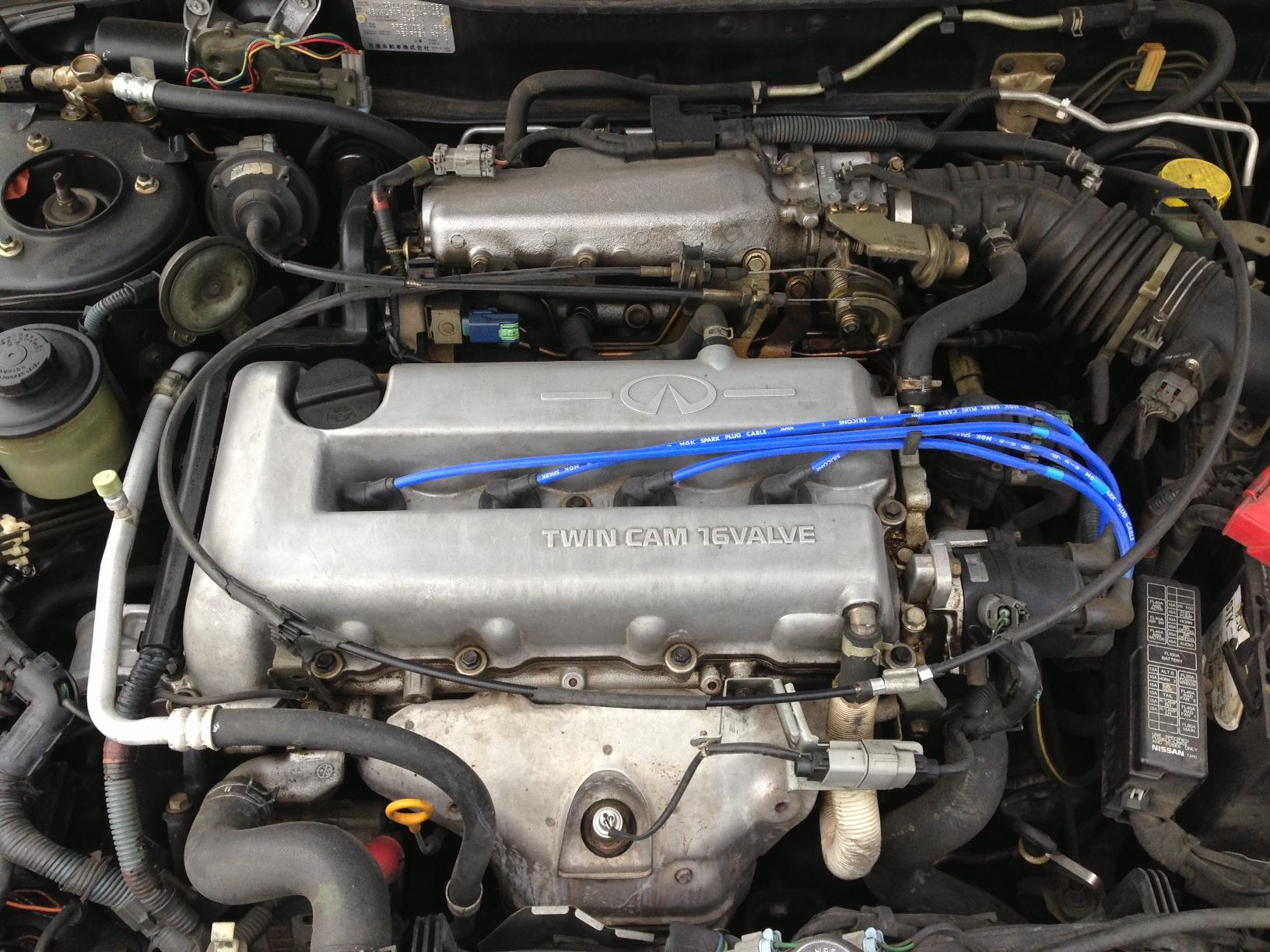
Nissan SR20DE engine in a 2001 Infiniti G20.

The SR20DE is a 2.0 L (1,998 cc) DOHC engine. It was used in over 15 Nissan models, first appearing in the U12 Bluebird in October 1989. It was gradually phased out over time with the introduction of the low-emissions QR engine family in 1999, until production stopped in 2002. It carried nominal power ratings between 125–165 hp (127–167 PS; 93–123 kW) from the factory, although there are some Autech models with horsepower ratings of between 175 and 200 hp depending on the chassis and degrees of tuning.

The breakdown of the engine code is as follows:

- SR - Engine
- 20 - 2.0 Litres
- D - Dual Overhead Cams
- E - Electronic Fuel Injection

This engine has the following specifications (SAE, 1991):

Specifications
Type:	Water cooled, 4 cycle in-line 4 cylinder
Combustion Chamber:	Cross flow, pentroof type
Valve mechanism:	DOHC, 4 valves per cylinder, chain drive
Displacement:	1,998 cc (2.0 L)
Bore x Stroke:	86 mm × 86 mm (3.39 in × 3.39 in)
Bore Pitch:	97 mm (3.82 in)
Block Height:	211.3 mm (8.32 in)
Compression ratio:	10.0:1
Crankshaft journal diameter:	55 mm (2.17 in)
Crankpin diameter:	48 mm (1.89 in)
Con rod length:	136.3 mm (5.37 in)
Valve diameters:	Intake: 34 mm (1.34 in), Exhaust: 30 mm (1.18 in)
Dimensions:	685 mm (27.0 in) x 610 mm (24 in) x 615 mm (24.2 in)
Power:	145 hp (147 PS; 108 kW) at 6400 rpm (SAE net)
Maximum torque:	132 lb⋅ft (179 N⋅m) at 4800 rpm (SAE net)

It is used in the following vehicles:

Model	Years Produced
180SX	1991–1992, 1994–1998
200SX SE-R	1995–1998
Almera	1996–1999
Almera Tino	1998–2006
Avenir	1990, 1992–1995, 1997–2001
Bluebird	1989, 1991–1993, 1995–1998, 1999–2007
Liberty	1998–2000
Infiniti G20	1991–2002
NX2000	1991–1996
Prairie Joy	1995–1997
Presea	1990–1993, 1995, 1997–1998
Primera	1990–2002
Pulsar	1991–2000
R'nessa	1997–1998, 2000
Rasheen	1998
Sentra	1991–1994, 1998–2001
Serena	1991–1995, 1997–2000
Silvia	1991–1993, 1995–1996, 1998–2002
Wingroad	1996–1999
Tommykaira ZZ (first generation)	1996–2001

== SR20DET ==
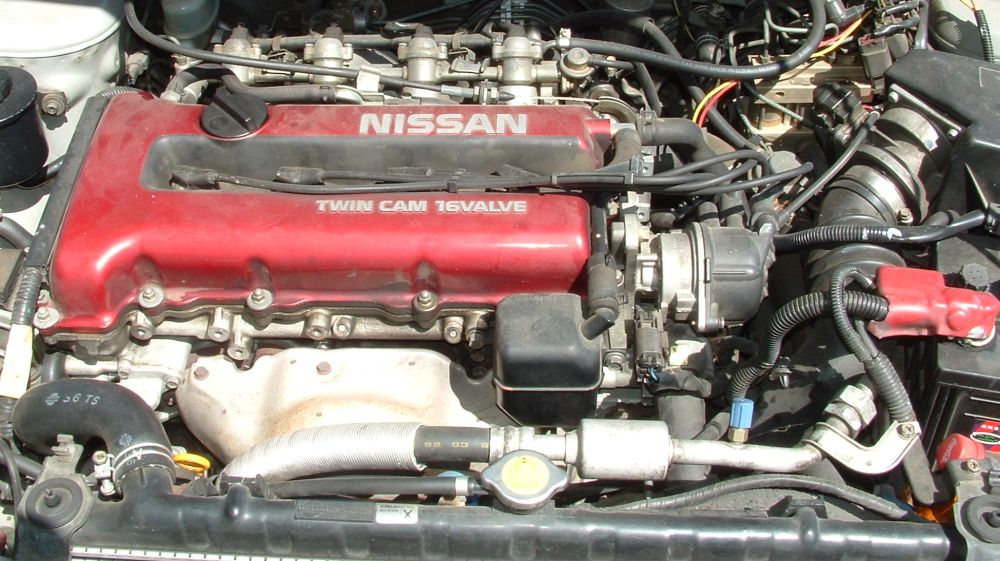
Nissan SR20DET engine in a U13 Bluebird (FWD/AWD layout).

The SR20DET is a 2.0 L (1,998 cc) DOHC engine. It is a turbocharged version of the SR20DE, with power outputs ranging from 204 PS (201 hp; 150 kW) at 6000 rpm to 250 PS (247 hp; 184 kW) at 6400 rpm, and torque outputs ranging from 266 N⋅m (196 lb⋅ft) at 4800 rpm to 280 N⋅m (207 lb⋅ft) at 4800 rpm. It was first used in the U12 Bluebird SSS ATTESA Limited from October 1989, and expanded to several cars from 1989 through 2002. The Silvia was the longest-running and most notable Nissan model to use the SR20DET, starting with the S13 series in 1991 and ending with the S15 series in 2002. This engine was replaced with the QR20DE engine in most applications.

It is used in the following vehicles:

- Transversal (FWD/AWD):
  - 1989-1991 Nissan Bluebird HNU12 SSS ATTESA Limited
  - 1990-1995 Nissan Pulsar RNN14 GTi-R
  - 1991-1997 Nissan Bluebird HNU13 SSS ATTESA Limited
  - 1995-1998 Nissan Avenir PNW10 Salut G GT Turbo
  - 1997-2001 Nissan R'nessa NN30 GT Turbo
  - 1998-2002 Nissan Avenir PNW11 Highway Star/GT4
  - 1998-2002 Nissan Liberty PNM12 GT4
- Longitudinal (RWD):
  - 1991-1994 Nissan Silvia S13 K's
  - 1991-1998 Nissan 180SX S13
  - 1994-1998 Nissan Silvia S14 K's
  - 1994-1998 Nissan 200SX S14 + "S14a"
  - 1994 Nismo 270R
  - 1999-2002 Nissan Silvia S15 Spec-R (JDM)
  - 1999-2002 Nissan 200SX S15 Spec-R/Spec-S (AUDM and NZDM)

== SR20VE ==
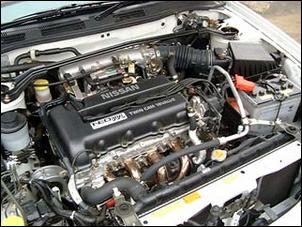
Nissan SR20VE engine

The 2.0 L (1,998 cc) SR20VE has Nissan's Neo VVL variable valve timing with lift control. It produces 190 PS (187 hp; 140 kW) at 7000 rpm and 20.0 kg⋅m (196 N⋅m; 145 lb⋅ft) at 6000 rpm with a 10.3:1 compression ratio and later (2001–2003) 204 PS (201 hp; 150 kW) at 7200 rpm and 21.0 kg⋅m (206 N⋅m; 152 lb⋅ft) at 5200 rpm with a 11:1 compression ratio.

This engine was never used on the USDM counterpart of the P11 Primera, the Infiniti G20, as it uses the 2.0 L SR20DE engine instead.

It is used in the following vehicles:

- 1997-2000 P11 JDM Nissan Primera Te-V sedan or G-V wagon, 190 PS (187 hp; 140 kW)
- 2001-2003 P12 JDM Nissan Primera, 20V sedan or W20V Wagon, 204 PS (201 hp; 150 kW)
- 1997-2000 U14 JDM Nissan Bluebird SSS-Z sedan, 190 PS (187 hp; 140 kW)
- 1997-2000 Y11 JDM Nissan Wingroad ZV-S wagon, 190 PS (187 hp; 140 kW)
- 2002 ASL Garaiya sports car, 204 PS (201 hp; 150 kW)

== SR20VET ==
Nissan SR20VET engine

The 2.0 L (1,998 cc) SR20VET was the first turbocharged engine from Nissan with variable valve lift (VVL), produced exclusively for the Japanese market. It produces 280 PS (206 kW; 276 hp) at 6400 rpm and 309 N⋅m (228 lb⋅ft) at 3200 rpm, with 9.0:1 compression ratio.

It is used in the following vehicles:

- 2001-2007 PNT30 Nissan X-Trail GT

== Camshaft Lift and Duration ==
Manufacturer	Type	Duration [°]	Lift [mm]	Engine Notes
Nissan	Intake	232	8.66	Stock low-port SR20DE (1985-2012)
Nissan	Intake	248	10.00	Stock high-port SR20DE (1991-1993)
Nissan	Exhaust	240	9.2	Stock Pulsar GTi-R (specific) SR20DET
Nissan	Intake	240	10.0	Stock Pulsar GTi-R (specific) SR20DET
Nissan	Exhaust	248	10.0	Stock Pulsar GTi-R (specific) SR20DET
Nissan	Intake	232	10.0	Stock Roller Rocker SR20DE (2000-up)
Nissan	Exhaust	240	9.2	Stock Roller Rocker SR20DE (2000-up)

== See also ==
- List of Nissan engines
