= Nissan Lucino =

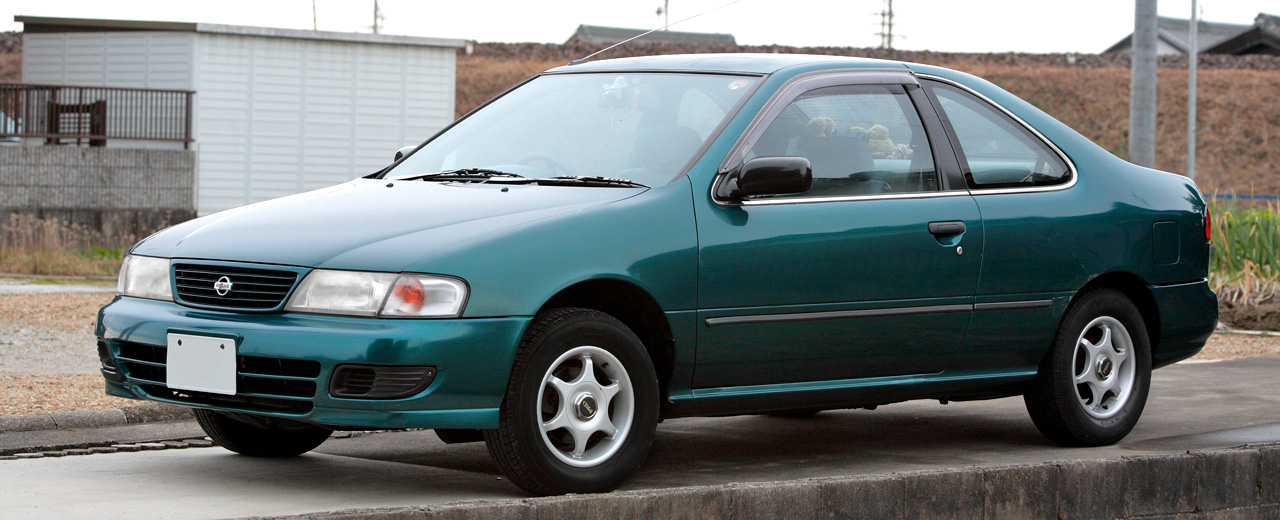
- 1994–1996 Nissan Lucino 1.5 MM coupé (Japan)

Overview
- Manufacturer: Nissan
- Model code: B14 (coupé); N15 (hatchback)
- Also called: Nissan 200SX (coupé; United States and Canada); Nissan Pulsar/Almera (N15; hatchback)
- Production: 1994–1999 (coupé; until 2000 in Mexico); 1995–1999 (3-door); 1995–2000 (5-door)
- Assembly: Japan: Yokosuka, Kanagawa (Oppama plant); United States: Smyrna, Tennessee (Nissan North America; coupé only); Mexico: Cuernavaca, Morelos (Nissan Mexicana; coupé only)

Body and chassis
- Class: Sport compact (coupé); Compact (hatchback)
- Body style: 2-door coupé; 3-door hatchback; 5-door hatchback
- Layout: Front-engine, front-wheel-drive; Front-engine, all-wheel-drive (hatchback only)
- Related: Nissan Presea (R11); Nissan Sunny/Sentra (B14)

Powertrain
- Engine: Petrol: 1.5 L GA15DE I4; 1.6 L GA16DE I4; 1.6 L SR16VE I4; 1.8 L SR18DE I4; 2.0 L SR20DE I4
- Transmission: 5-speed manual: RS5F30A/RS5F31V/RS5F32V; 4-speed automatic: RL4F03A/RL4F03V

Dimensions
- Wheelbase: 2,535 mm (100 in)
- Length: 3-door: 4,120 mm (162 in) (1995–1997); 4,140 mm (163 in) (1997–1999); 4,165 mm (164 in) (Autech); 5-door: 4,165 mm (164 in) (Aero Selection); 4,190 mm (165 in); 4,425 mm (174 in) (Aero Sports); Coupé: 4,285 mm (169 in) (Japan); 4,320 mm (170 in) (North America; 1995–1998); 4,365 mm (172 in) (North America; 1998–2000)
- Width: 1,690 mm (67 in); 1,735 mm (68 in) (5-door Aero Sports)
- Height: Coupé: 1,375 mm (54 in); 3-door: 1,385 mm (55 in) (FWD); 1,410 mm (56 in) (AWD); 5-door: 1,445 mm (57 in) (FWD); 1,470 mm (58 in) (AWD)
- Curb weight: Coupé: 970–1,200 kg (2,140–2,650 lb); 3-door: 990–1,140 kg (2,180–2,510 lb) (FWD); 1,160–1,190 kg (2,557–2,624 lb) (AWD); 5-door: 1,040–1,170 kg (2,290–2,580 lb) (FWD); 1,190–1,330 kg (2,620–2,930 lb) (AWD)

Chronology
- Predecessor: Nissan NX; Nissan Sunny/Sentra (B13; 2-door sedan)
- Successor: Nissan Tiida (C11) (hatchback, indirect)

The Nissan Lucino (Japanese: 日産・ルキノ, Hepburn: Nissan Rukino) is a small automobile nameplate used by the Japanese manufacturer Nissan between 1994 and 2000. The Lucino name applied simultaneously to a pair of entirely different vehicles—a two-door coupé version of the Sunny/Sentra (B14)—and badge engineered versions of the Pulsar/Almera (N15) three- and five-door hatchbacks. Despite their different bodies, both vehicles shared the same floorpan. For Japan, coupés arrived first in 1994, followed by hatchbacks in 1995. Production in Japan ended in 1999, except for the five-door, which lingered on until 2000.

All versions of the Lucino were exclusive to Nissan dealerships in Japan called Nissan Satio Store, just as the previous Sunny two-door had been. In 1999, when Nissan consolidated Nissan Satio Store locations into Nissan Red Stage, the Lucino coupé was canceled.

Outside Japan, the coupé retailed in Mexico under its original name. North American customers were offered the coupé as the Nissan 200SX between 1995 and 1998, for model years of the same.

== Coupé (B14; 1994–1999) ==
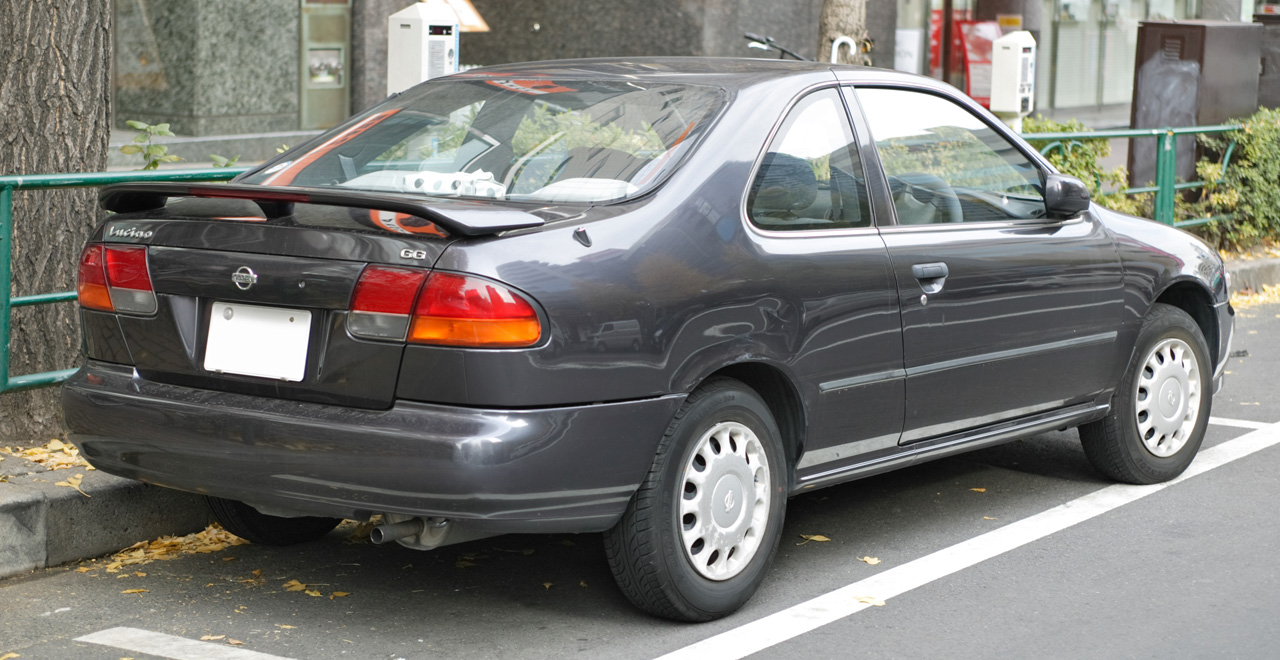
Nissan Lucino 1.5 GG coupé (FB14, Japan)

Based on the Sunny (B14) four-door sedan, the B14 series Lucino two-door coupé launched in May 1994 to Japan, replacing the Sunny (B13) two-door sedan. The Lucino shared its basic styling, including front-end appearance, front-wheel-drive chassis, interior dashboard, and many dimensions with the Sunny. With the B14, Nissan decided to differentiate the two-door model from the four-door in Japan through means of a different name. This was to appeal to a new market of buyers who were very familiar with the Sunny, and augment the two-door coupé with badge engineered Pulsar Serie (N15) hatchbacks, while still offering the Sunny as a four-door sedan. The affordable and traditionally practical two-door model was renamed Lucino, which was derived from the word "lucina", a character in Greek and Roman mythology for the goddess of birth.

During its production, the Lucino coupé's competitors in the Japanese market compact front-wheel drive coupé segment included the Toyota Corolla Levin/Sprinter Trueno (E110) duo, the Mitsubishi Mirage Asti, and the short-lived Honda Civic (EJ7) coupé and Subaru Impreza Retna.

The Lucino coupé was offered in three trim levels: MM and GG for the 1.5-liter GA15DE models (FB14), and 1.8SS for the 1.8-liter SR18DE (HB14). Both engines were mated to either a five-speed manual or a four-speed automatic transmission. In the early 1996, the Nissan subsidiary Autech released a special modified version of the Lucino 1.8SS. The engine was swapped for a bigger 2.0-liter SR20DE and tuned to produce 175 PS (129 kW; 173 hp), mated to a five-speed manual with a standard viscous limited-slip differential (VLSD). Other improvements included sports suspension, a front strut tower bar, improved brakes, additional add-on aero kits, a new grille, 15-inch alloy wheels, a trunk spoiler, a white-colored instrument cluster and new seat and door panel fabrics with confetti patterns. Later in June 1996, the Lucino coupé was facelifted with a new mesh grille, refreshed seat upholstery, and the standardization of dual airbag and ABS safety systems.

In September 1997, the 1.8-liter 1.8SS model was replaced by a new trim level called VZ-R (JB14). This new model was powered by a high-revving 1.6-liter SR16VE engine and a standard five-speed manual transmission, which also generated 175 PS (129 kW; 173 hp), the same as the Lucino Autech. All trims gained a unique dual-tone exterior option called Custard Yellow/Blueish Silver Metallic. For the VZ-R and GG Type S (the GG trim equipped with standard sport seats and a spoiler), an optional black and yellow dual-tone interior was also introduced.

=== Mexico ===
In Mexico, the Lucino sold between 1996 and 2000 under its original name and produced locally in Cuernavaca. The coupé was available in two versions: GSE with the 1.6-liter GA16DE engine, and GSR with the 2.0-liter SR20DE unit, the former was not available for the Japanese market Lucino coupé. There was also a GTR model with standard aero kits made by AirDesign for the GSR model. A minor facelift occurred in 1998 with a new inverted mesh grille from the 1998 model year Sentra (B14) and taillights. The coupé underwent another facelift in 1999, and again featured the same front end of the Sentra of the same model year.

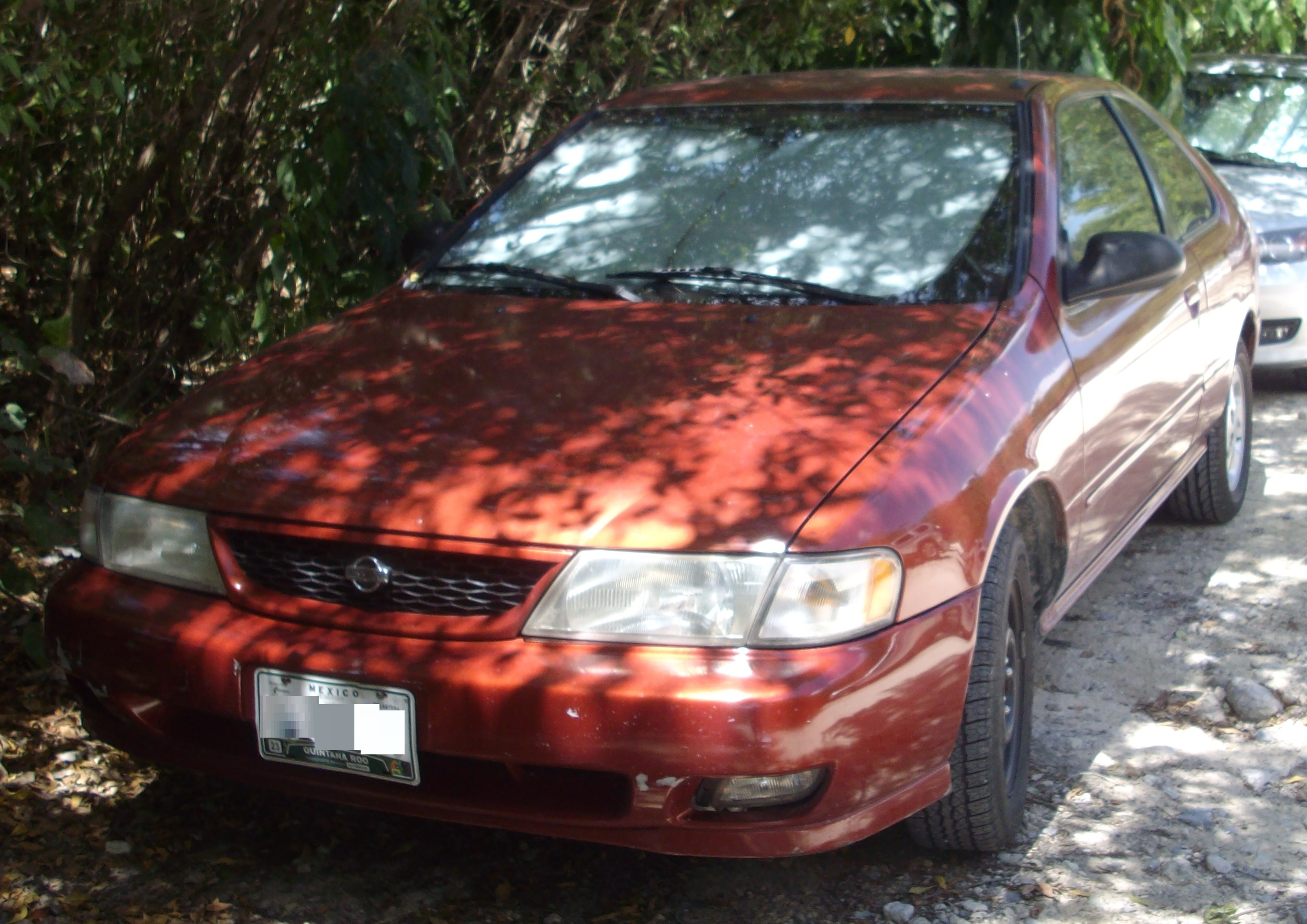
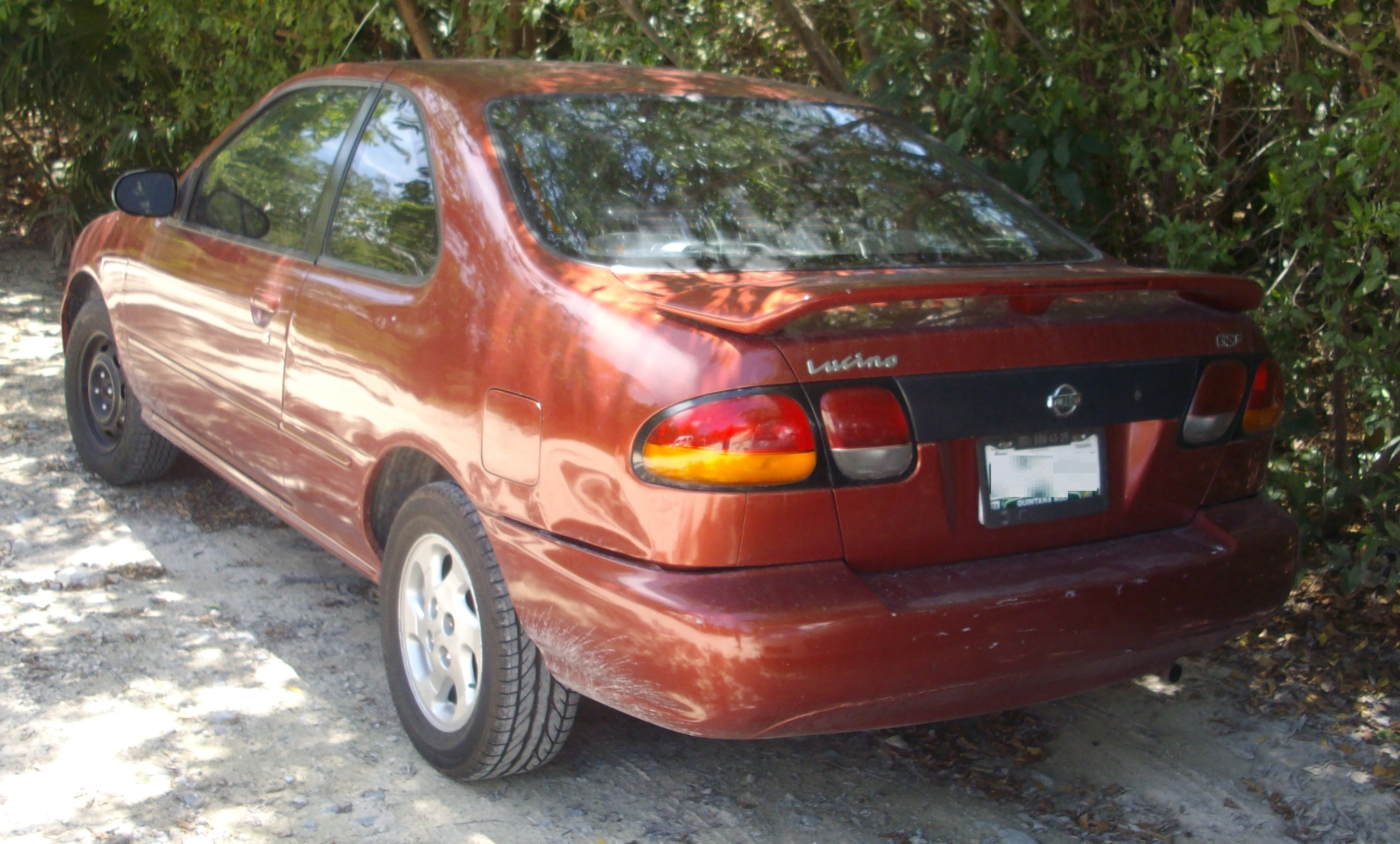
1998–1999 Nissan Lucino 1.6 GSE (Mexico)

=== Nissan 200SX ===
For the United States and Canada, Nissan renamed the Lucino as the 200SX, recycling the nameplate to designate the two-door coupé version of the Sentra (B14). The 200SX, introduced in 1995 for the 1995 model year, replaced Nissan's previous compact two-door models, the Sentra (B13) and NX. With the exception of this Lucino-derived model, every other Nissan with a name ending in "SX" refers to a car based on the Nissan S platform.

The North American 200SX came in base, SE, and sportier SE-R models. Base and SE editions shared the Sentra's twin-cam, 1.6-liter GA16DE inline-four engine. The SE-R inherited the 140 hp (104 kW; 142 PS) 2.0-liter SR20DE engine used in the previous two-door Sentra SE-R. The 200SX was never offered with the 1.6-liter SR16VE engine that was only used by the Lucino in Japan. All three models came with a five-speed manual transmission or four-speed automatic, and were equipped with dual airbags. Anti-lock brakes were optional in the SE and SE-R. A viscous limited-slip differential (VLSD) was available for the SE-R models from model years 1995 to 1997.

North American cars received model year updates for 1996, 1997 and 1998:

==== 1996 ====
The SE and SE-R gained new body-colored mirrors and door handles.

==== 1997 ====
The base model adopted the same interior trim as its SE and SE-R companions, the round exhaust finisher was changed to an oval unit for this year's SE-R model, and the rear spoiler was made standard on all trim levels. The SE-R was no longer available in California due to tightening emissions requirements.

==== 1998 ====
The SE-R returned to California this year with additional emissions equipment on the SR20DE engine. The viscous limited-slip differential (VLSD) that came with the 1995 to 1997 model year SE-R trim levels was eliminated. All models received new head- and tail-lamps, revised bumpers, an altered grille, and white-face gauges. Base models replaced the 13-inch wheels with 14-inch versions. For the SE, an oval exhaust finisher replaced previous year's round exhaust finisher, similar to the 1997 model year SE-R.

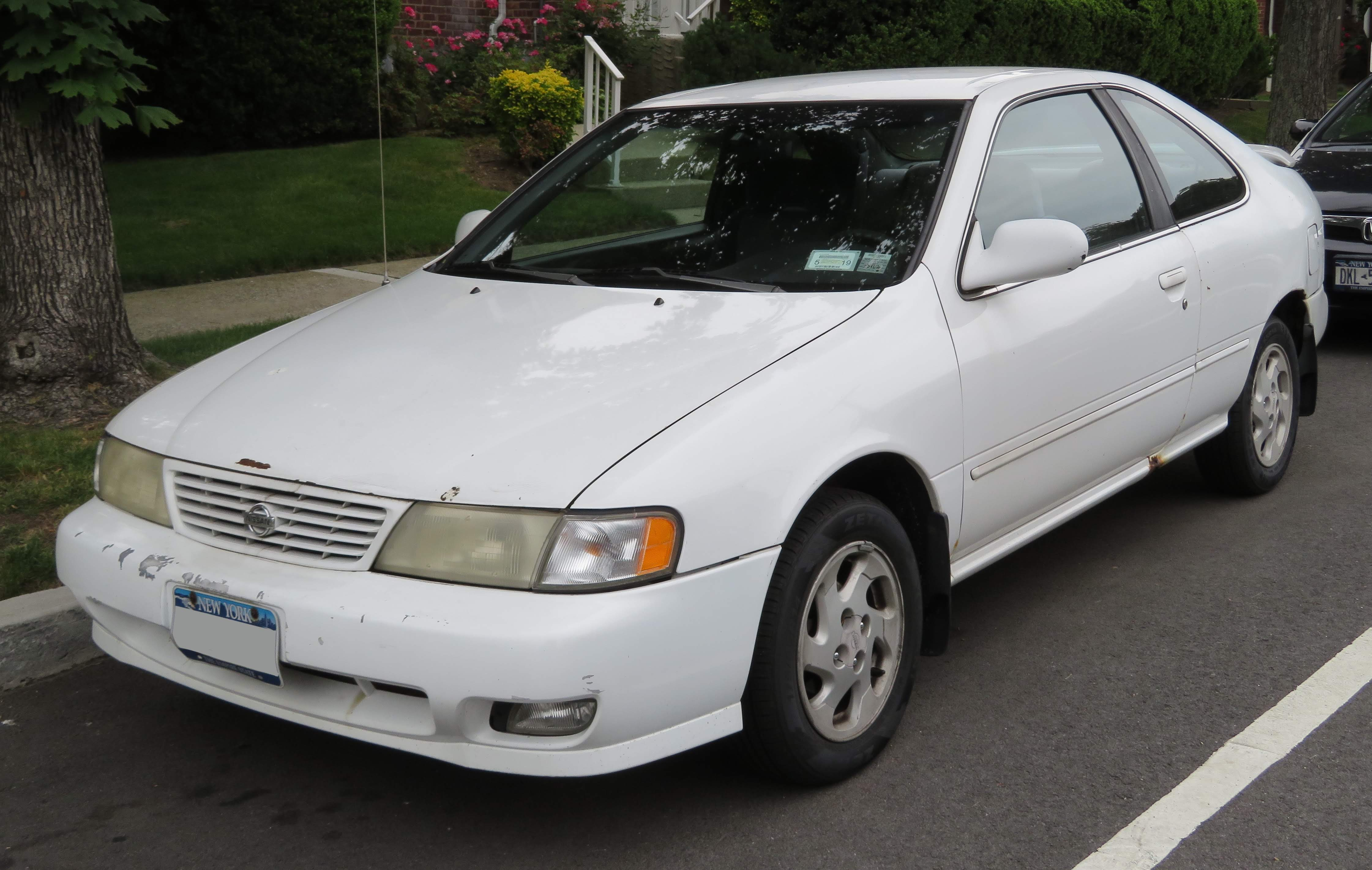
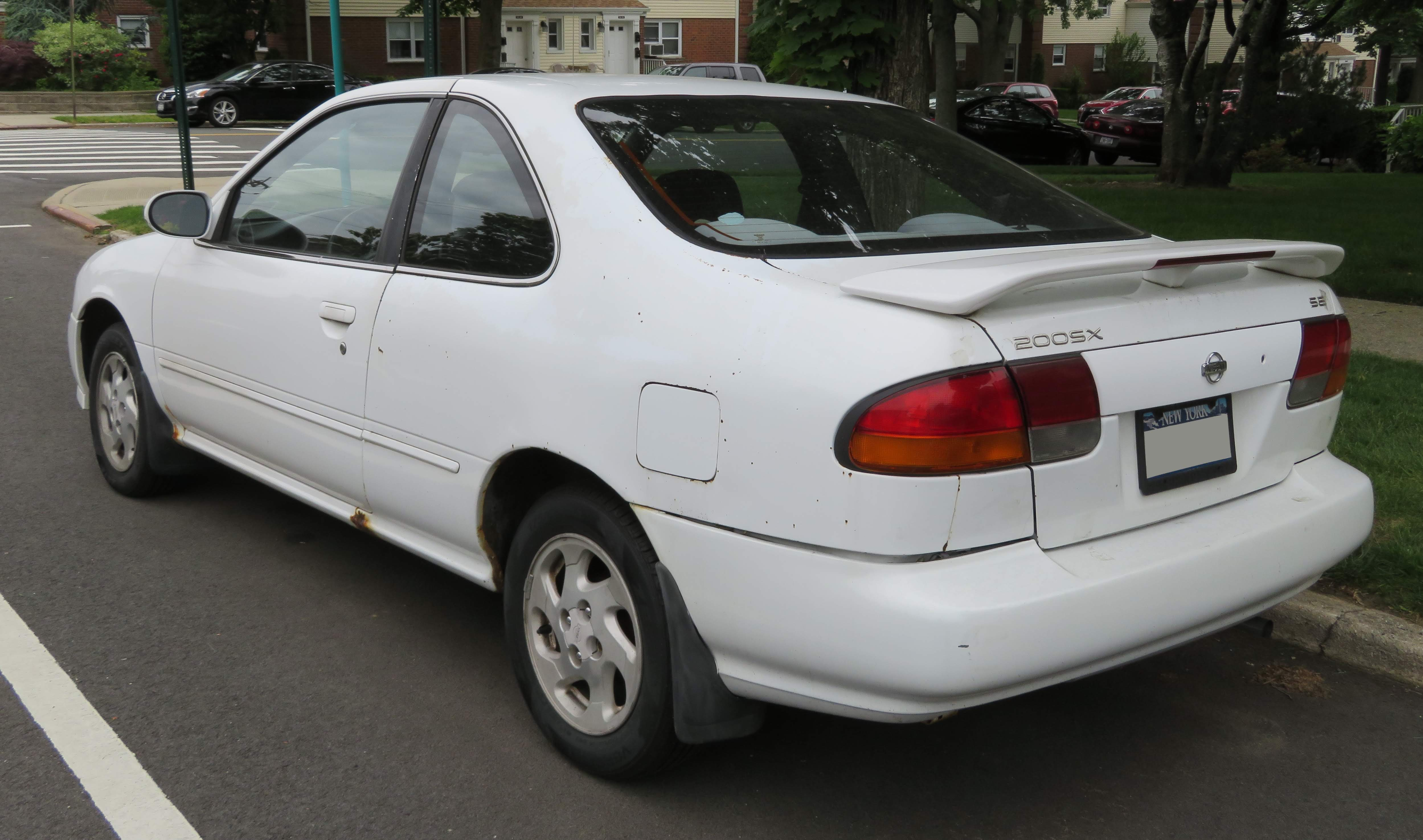
1997–1998 Nissan 200SX 1.6 SE (US)

== Hatchback (N15; 1995–2000) ==
Designated N15, the Lucino three- and five-door hatchbacks sold only in Japan, exclusive to the Nissan Satio Store from 1995. These were badge engineered versions of the Pulsar Serie (N15) hatchbacks sold at Nissan Cherry Store locations. The differences between the Lucino and Pulsar Serie hatchbacks were minor; the easiest way to tell them apart is by their different grilles, taillights and trim level designations. Unlike the coupé, the hatchbacks were also available with an optional all-wheel drive system on certain models.

The three-door model was introduced first in January 1995 and offered in four trim levels: the BB and JJ for the 1.5-liter models (FN15), the RR for the 1.6-liter model (EN15), and the ZZ for the 1.8-liter model (HN15). An all-wheel drive system was optional on the JJ trim and was given the FNN15 model code. As with the Pulsar hatchback and sedan, the base model BB trim of the Lucino three-door hatchback featured a different front bumper than the higher models.

In May 1996, a five-door hatchback called the Lucino S-RV was added to the lineup. This new model was marketed as an all-terrain, crossover-style vehicle with off-road accessories and a higher ground clearance, while featuring the base Lucino BB three-door's front bumper. The trim levels for the S-RV were simply designated 1500 and 1800; an optional all-wheel drive system was offered for both, with the 1.8-liter with the all-wheel drive model receiving the HNN15 designation and an advanced ATTESA system. The three-door hatchback received a minor facelift in September 1996, featuring a new mesh grille and standard dual airbags across the range. An Autech version was also introduced, featuring the same tuned 2.0-liter SR20DE engine and interior found in the coupé model, but fitted with an aggressive front bumper and a large roof wing.

In January 1997, Autech released the Aero Sports, a rugged special edition based on the all-wheel-drive 1.8-liter model. This variant featured a distinct off-road aesthetic, characterized by a tailgate-mounted spare tire, over-fenders, and a longer rear bumper. The exterior was further enhanced with a full aero kit, a roof wing, large fog lamps, 15-inch alloy wheels, side body decals, and only available with a dual-tone Super Black and Bluish Silver Metallic color. Inside, the cabin received a premium touch with a leather-wrapped steering wheel. Major improvements occurred in September 1997 with the arrival of the 1.6-liter SR16VE VZ-R models (JN15) for both hatchbacks. However, unlike the coupé, the larger 1.8-liter SR18DE engine remained in the lineup. The hatchbacks also received a facelift, featuring new taillights and a redesigned front bumper for the three-door model. Autech also launched a modified Lucino VZ-R three-door hatchback called the N1; its engine power was increased to 200 PS (147 kW; 197 hp) for competition in Super Taikyu. The S-RV lineup expanded to include a conventional five-door hatchback featuring the facelifted Pulsar sedan and Almera (N15) front bumper; this variant was offered exclusively with a 1.5-liter GA15DE engine and front-wheel drive in a single F trim level. Two new special models converted by Autech were also added to the S-RV range: the Aero Selection, basically a five-door VZ-R version of the earlier three-door Autech with some improvements, and the Aero Sports 2.0, which now featured a non-tuned 150 PS (110 kW; 148 hp) 2.0-liter SR20DE engine.

In October 1998, Autech launched an upgraded version of the VZ-R N1, called the N1 Version II. This iteration featured a specialized suspension that lowered the ride height by 15 mm (1 in), a bespoke front strut tower bar, wider Dunlop performance tires, and a thicker rear stabilizer bar, alongside further weight reduction. Inside, the cabin was equipped with Skyline GT-R (R32) bucket seats featuring orange cushions and door trim, complemented by a special leather-wrapped MOMO steering wheel.

Three-door models lasted until September 1999, with the five-door model seeing its demise in August 2000, fully retiring the Lucino name and product line in Japan. This discontinuation occurred without a direct successor.

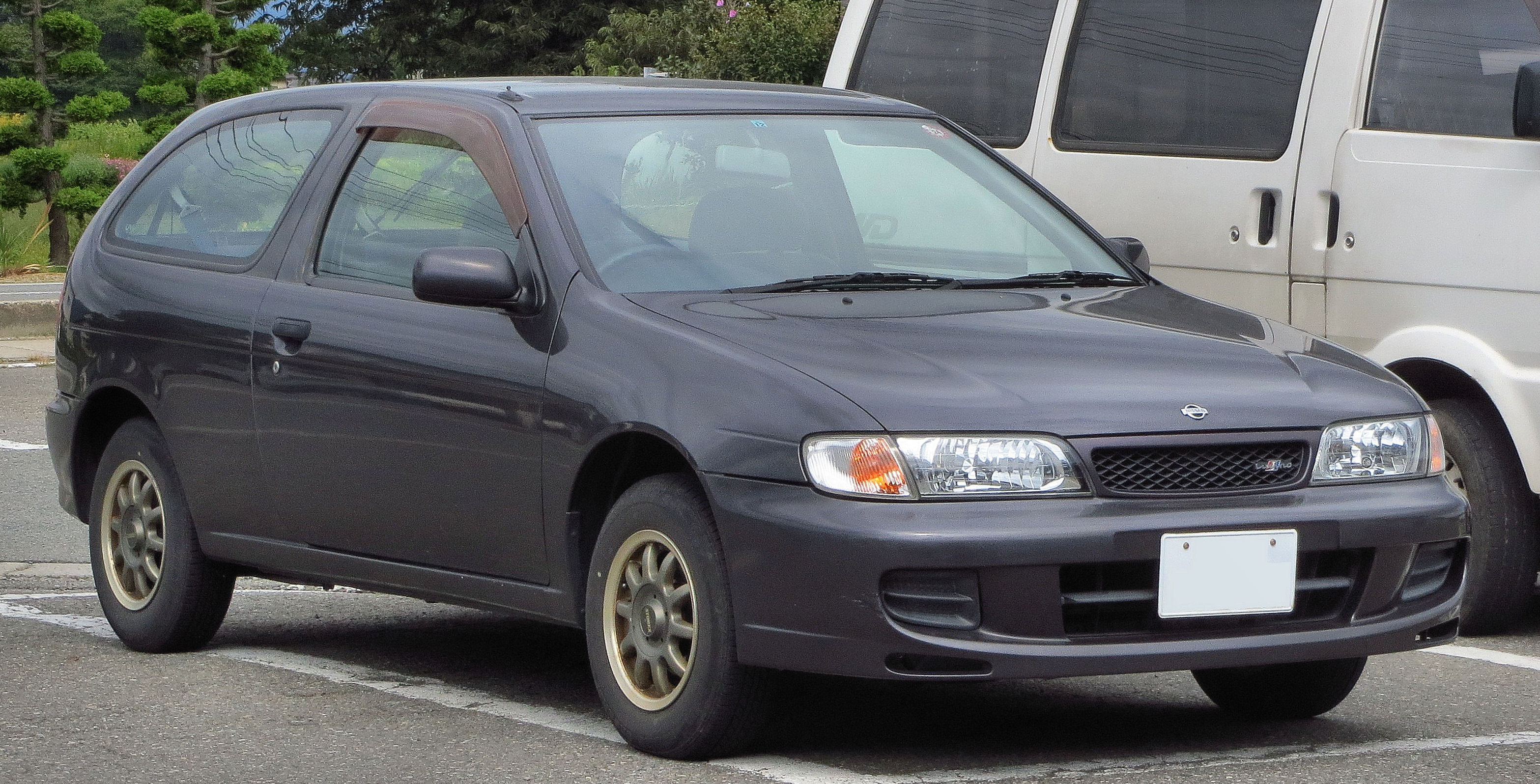
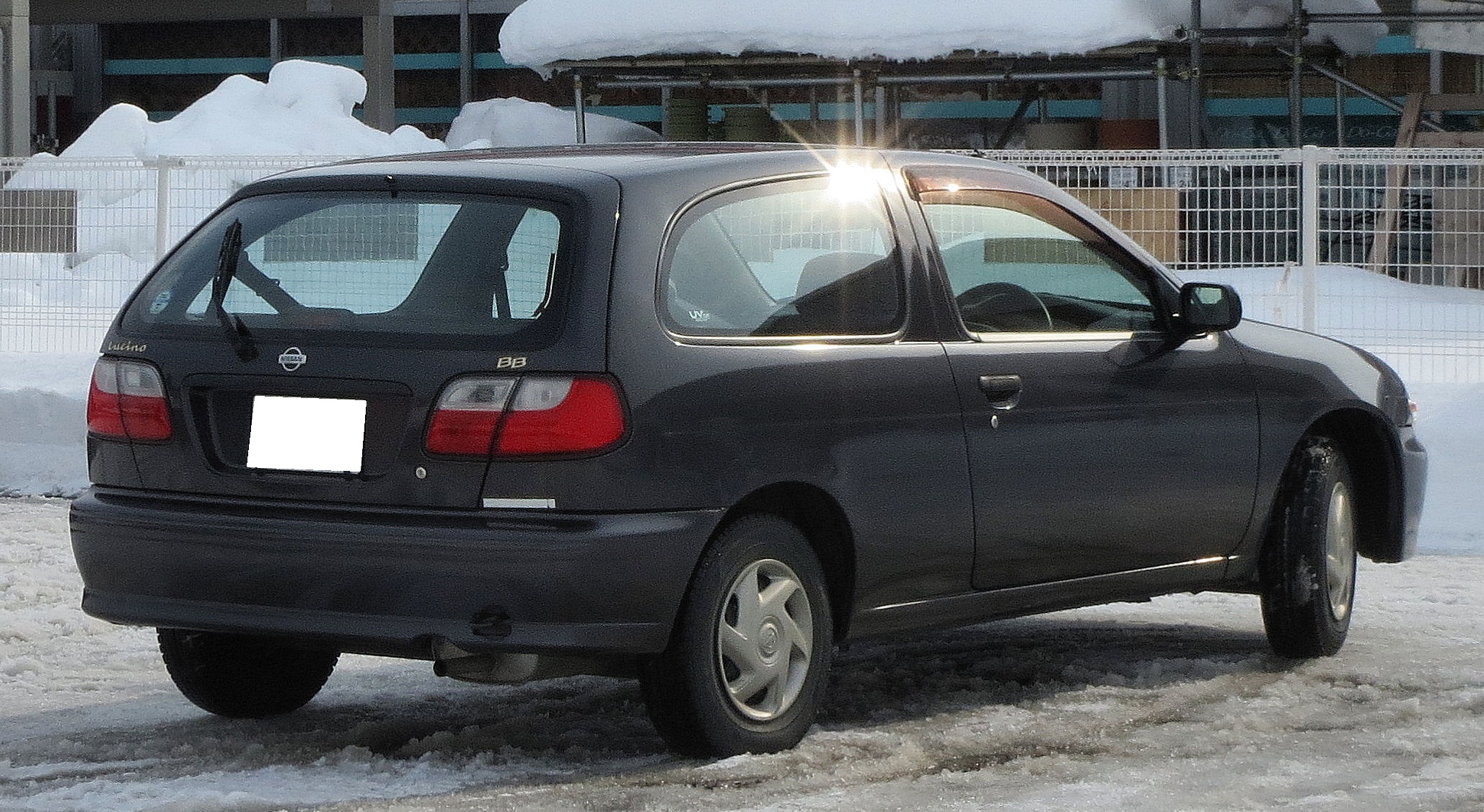
1997–1999 Nissan Lucino 1.5 BB 3-door hatchback (FN15)

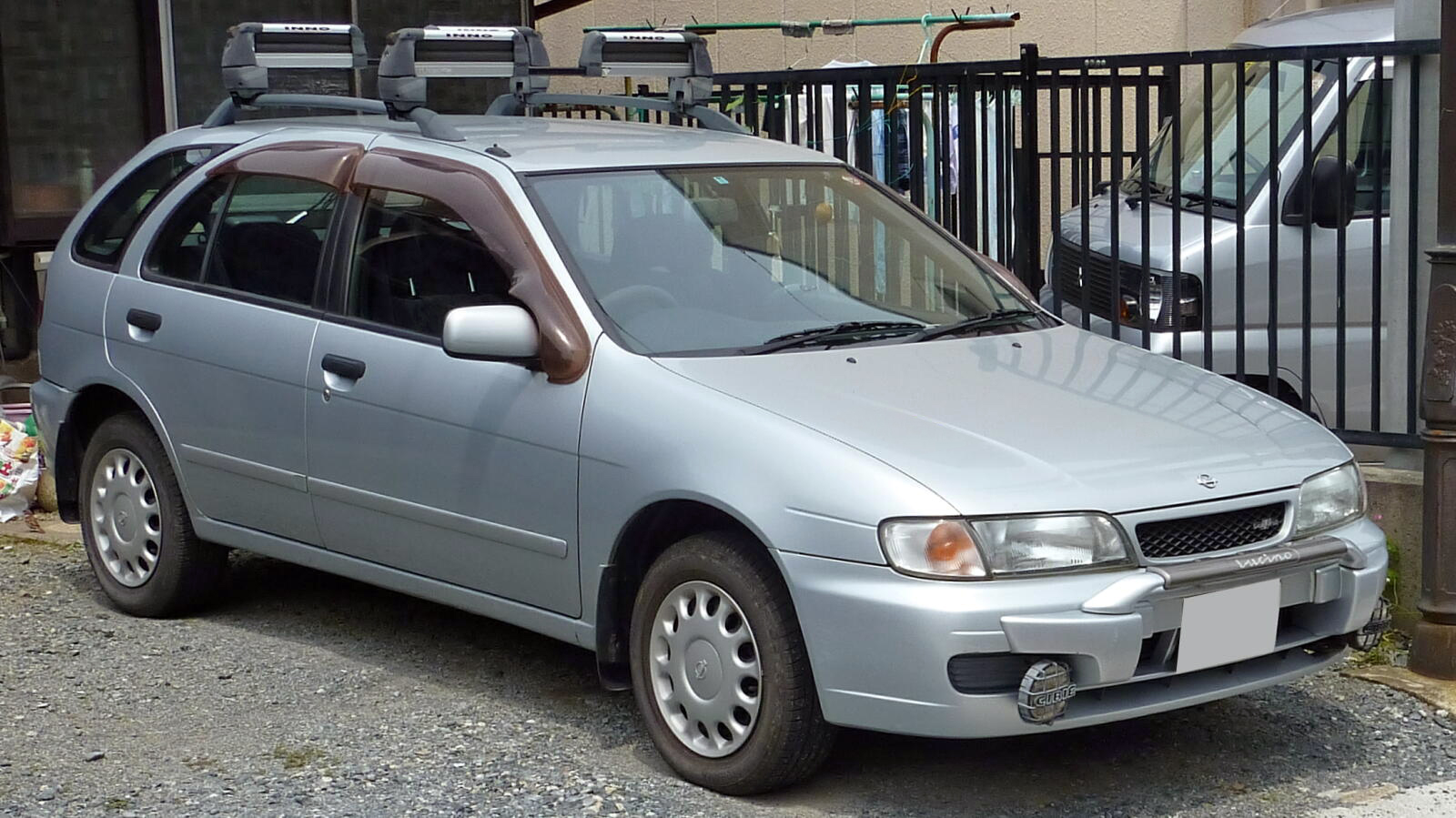
1996–2000 Nissan Lucino S-RV 1500 5-door hatchback (FN15)

== Production ==
North America (200SX)
| Model year | Base | SE | SE-R |
|---|---|---|---|
| 1995 | ??? | ??? | ??? |
| 1996 | ??? | ??? | 7,205 |
| 1997 | ??? | ??? | 3,200 |
| 1998 | ??? | ??? | 3,504 |

== See also ==
- List of Nissan vehicles
