= GA16DE =

Inline-four engine made by Nissan

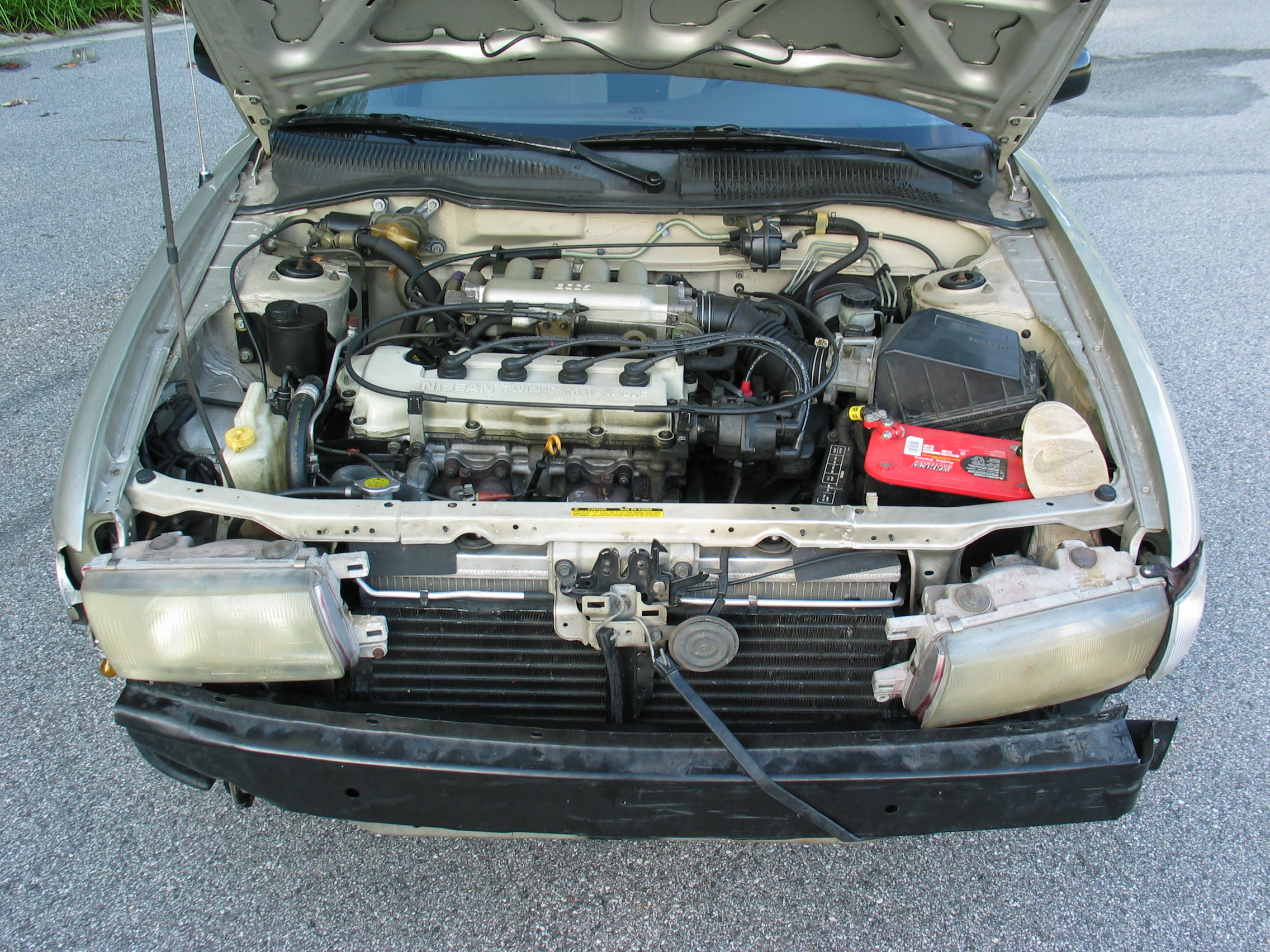
Nissan GA16DE engine

The GA16DE is an inline-four engine made by Nissan from 1987 through 2011. It is used in models such as the Nissan Sunny (N14 and B14), Nissan Almera (N15), and the Nissan Primera (P10, injection models, P11 & P11-144) 100NX. It is similar to the GA14DE, but has a larger displacement.

The GA16DE is a robust, reliable engine with a displacement of 1,596 cc (97.4 cu in). It has a 76 mm (3.0 in) bore and 88 mm (3.5 in) stroke with 9.5:1 compression ratio.

== History ==
In North America it was used in the 1991-1999 Sentra, and NX models. Later-model GA16DE (95-99) engines had more aggressive cams, straighter intake ports and performed slightly better. The factory redline is set to 6900 rpm, with aftermarket tuning increasing it to 7300 rpm. Despite its economical design, GA16DE-powered cars were somewhat popular in tuning circles, due to a smooth powerband and good response to bolt-on modifications.

In the UK it was featured in the first 3 incarnations of the Nissan Primera featuring good fuel economy and, despite its low displacement, decent performance thanks to its twin cams and 16-valve configuration. Power (based on the 96-99 1.6 primera) is 98 bhp (73 kW) @ 6000 rpm.

In Australia it was used in the Nissan Pulsar N14 and N15.

A GA16DE was released with the NVCS (Nissan Variable Cam [timing] System) solenoid. It carries the plastic rocker black valve cover with a different throttle body design which produced 115 hp (86 kW) @ 6400 rpm and 110 lb⋅ft (150 N⋅m) @ 4400 rpm. The solenoid "opens" completely at 4,000 rpm.

== See also ==
- Nissan GA engine
