= Nissan Presea =

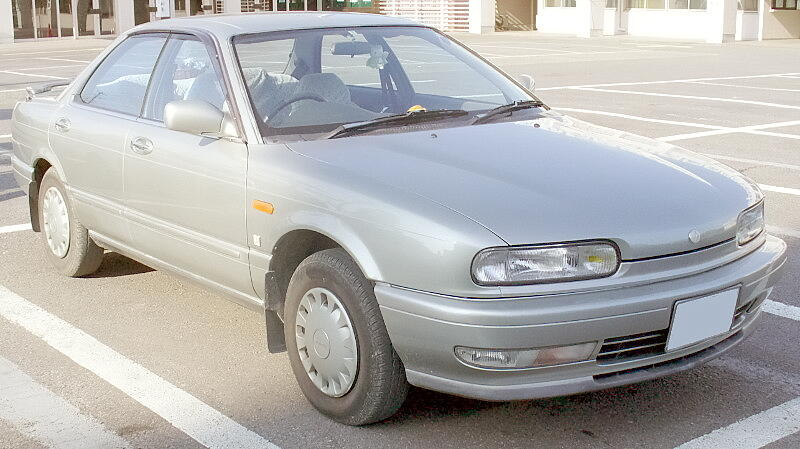

Overview
- Manufacturer: Nissan
- Production: 1990–2000
- Assembly: Zama, Kanagawa, Japan (Zama Plant) (1990–1994); Musashimurayama, Tokyo, Japan (Musashimurayama Plant) (1995–1999)
- Designer: Satoshi Wada (1989)

Body and chassis
- Class: Compact
- Body style: 4-door hardtop
- Layout: FF layout
- Related: NX Coupe; Nissan Pulsar; Nissan Sunny

Powertrain
- Engine: 1.5 L Nissan PLASMA I4, GA15DE; 1.6 L Nissan PLASMA I4, GA16DE; 1.8 L Nissan PLASMA I4, SR18DE; 2.0 L Nissan PLASMA I4, SR20DE
- Transmission: 4-speed automatic 5-speed manual

Dimensions
- Wheelbase: 2,500 mm (98.4 in) (R10)
- Length: 4,420 mm (174.0 in) (R10)
- Width: 1,690 mm (66.5 in) (R10)
- Height: 1,320 mm (52.0 in) (R10)

Chronology
- Predecessor: Nissan Laurel Spirit
- Successor: Nissan Sylphy

The Nissan Presea (Japanese: 日産・プレセア, Hepburn: Nissan Puresea) is a compact car, produced for the Asian market from 1990 to 2000. It competed with the entry-level luxury 4-door hardtop sedans that were popular in Japan during the 1990s, notably the Toyota Corolla Ceres, the Toyota Sprinter Marino, the Honda Integra, and the Mazda Lantis.

"Presea" is Spanish for "jewel" or "important".

== R10 (1990–1995) ==
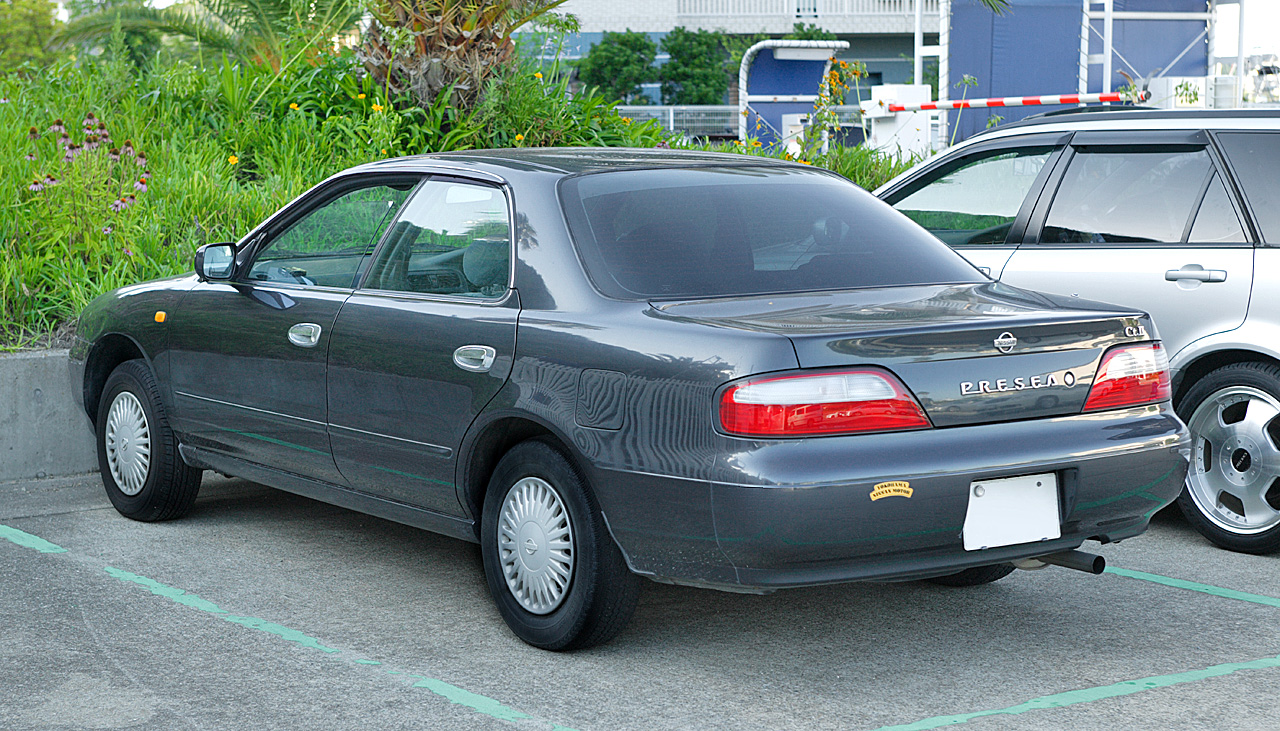
Nissan Presea

The original R10 Presea was based on the B13 series Nissan Sunny platform, and replaced the Nissan Laurel Spirit. It continued to be a smaller companion to the Nissan Laurel of this time period, sharing much of the styling influences and attention to luxury in a smaller package. Its appearance was also very similar to the much larger Nissan President. Like the Laurel, it was exclusive to Nissan Japanese dealerships called Nissan Store.

It shared many attributes with its sibling model. However, body panels and interior were done to a much higher specification. Interior fabrics matched those on the Laurel, with standard features including automatic headlights, lighted key slot, rear-illuminated instrument cluster, integrated sound system, automatic climate control, digital temperature control, adjustable shoulder height seat-belts, 4-way adjustments, lumbar support for the driver's seat, windscreen wipers with adjustable intermittent timings, remotely controlled wing mirrors that folded close and most importantly, frameless windows that mimicked the NX Coupe and Silvia. In fact, so feature-full and advanced was the car that many units had 4-disc brakes with ABS and a rear windscreen wiper.

The engines offered were shared with the Nissan Pulsar and the Nissan NX two-door coupes.

The A-pillar was slightly thinner than most compact cars, and the B-pillar was practically non-existent from the outside, and on the inside, it was just wide enough to accommodate the seat belt assembly. The C-pillar created a wrap-around rear windscreen. All these design features allowed for a more than 300-degree vision for the driver, much like that of a fighter pilot. The rounded exterior left no visible straight edge on the car, and the grille-less front end gave the car a very sleek and futuristic look, with some visual similarities to the Infiniti Q45.

== R11 (1995–2000) ==
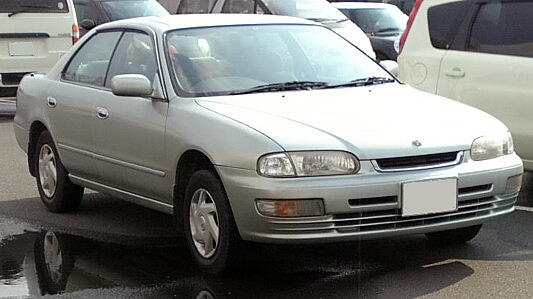
1995 Nissan Presea

The R11 Presea launched in 1995 was a bit longer. In some countries, including Japan, the venerable SR18DE with 125 hp replaced the 110 hp SR18D(i) engine, alongside GA15DE and SR20DE engines. It still had the same drivetrain as the Nissan Sunny B14 (1994–1998) and the same frameless door windows as the R10 Nissan Presea, although it was a little longer (4425 mm + 2525 mm wheelbase), wider (1695 mm) and taller (1325 mm).

In Singapore, Thailand and New Zealand, the R11 Presea came predominantly with the old GA16DE. With essentially every curve and panel being the same and only fresher-looking headlights and rear lamp cluster, the car still had the same old MacPherson struts suspension up front and rear multi-link geometry. Market demand for such a car fell rapidly, as the economic recession in Japan began to take full effect, known in Japan as the Lost Decade, and the Presea was also cancelled after a review under the Nissan Revival Plan.

== Specifications ==
=== Dimensions ===
The Presea was another clone of the Sunny/Pulsar, part of Nissan's strategy of selling the Sunny at one of four dealerships. The car was in compliance with Japanese government regulations concerning exterior dimensions and engine displacement size, offering buyers higher luxury content of the larger Bluebird/Stanza/Auster/Liberta, while still offering the economy and tax savings of the smaller Sunny/Pulsar.

Compared to the most compact cars of that time, the Nissan Presea was an unusually long sedan. The R10 stood at 4420 mm, 15 centimetres longer than the Sentra. It was also rather low for a sedan at 1320 mm; with passengers often feeling the need to stoop to get into the car. At 1690 mm wide, it was as wide as it needed to be for two adults (and possibly a child) in the rear seats. The slightly longer wheelbase (compared to the Sunny) at 2500 mm was class-leading for that era of compact cars. All these dimensions added up to a comfortable (albeit low) car with decent comfort and presence. The boot space was more than adequate, at over 300 litres (18,000 in^{3}) in capacity. Due to the way the back seats lean back (which in turn gave the rear passengers a lot more comfort), objects over 1000 mm in length and 1200 mm in width could fit. The boot height of over 400 mm (16 in) also allowed for competent handling of most purchases during shopping sprees. However, the narrow aperture height limited its usability.

=== Handling ===
For better handling, it had MacPherson struts up front with multi-link rear suspension (with parallel arms). This independent setup combined with the longer wheelbase gave good comfort on the highway and a pretty good grip for aggressive cornering. For most models, the car was endowed with ventilated front disc brakes with a single large piston. The rear brakes were either solid disc brakes or semi-trailing drum brakes with self-adjusting shoes.

=== Engine sizes ===
In Japan, most Preseas came with a 1498 cc GA15DS, a 1798cc SR18Di engine, or the 1998 cc SR20DE. For the rest of the world, a more common 1598 cc GA16DE engine was available, providing sufficient power and fuel economy with its VTC (variable valve timing) and DOHC design. As its engine bay was slightly longer than the B13 Sentra, the SR20DET could easily fit into it without much trouble. Standard Nissan mounting points allowed for the easy swapping of clutches and gearboxes between models in this range of cars. With the ample under-bonnet capacity, larger turbos and intercoolers could be fitted provided the owner did not mind slight modifications to the engine bay. All engines offered were liable for the same amount of Japanese annual road tax.
