= Autech =

Car tuning division of Nissan

- Native name: オーテック
- Romanized name: Ōtekku
- Type: Division
- Industry: Automotive
- Founded: 17 September 1986; 40 years ago (as a company); 1 April 2022; 4 years ago (as a division)
- Fate: Merged with Nismo
- Headquarters: Chigasaki-shi, Japan
- Key people: Shinichiro Sakurai; Naganori Ito
- Services: Car tuning
- Parent: Nissan Motorsports & Customizing
- Website: www.autech.co.jp

Autech (オーテック, Ōtekku) is a division of Nissan Motorsports & Customizing focused on tuning and converting Nissan cars. Autech was a subsidiary company of Nissan from its establishment in 1986 to 2022, when it was merged with Nismo.

== History ==
Autech was founded in 1986 as a subsidiary of Nissan. Nissan named Shinichiro Sakurai, the former general manager of the company's Advanced Vehicle Design Department, as the first president of the new company.

=== Partnership with Zagato ===
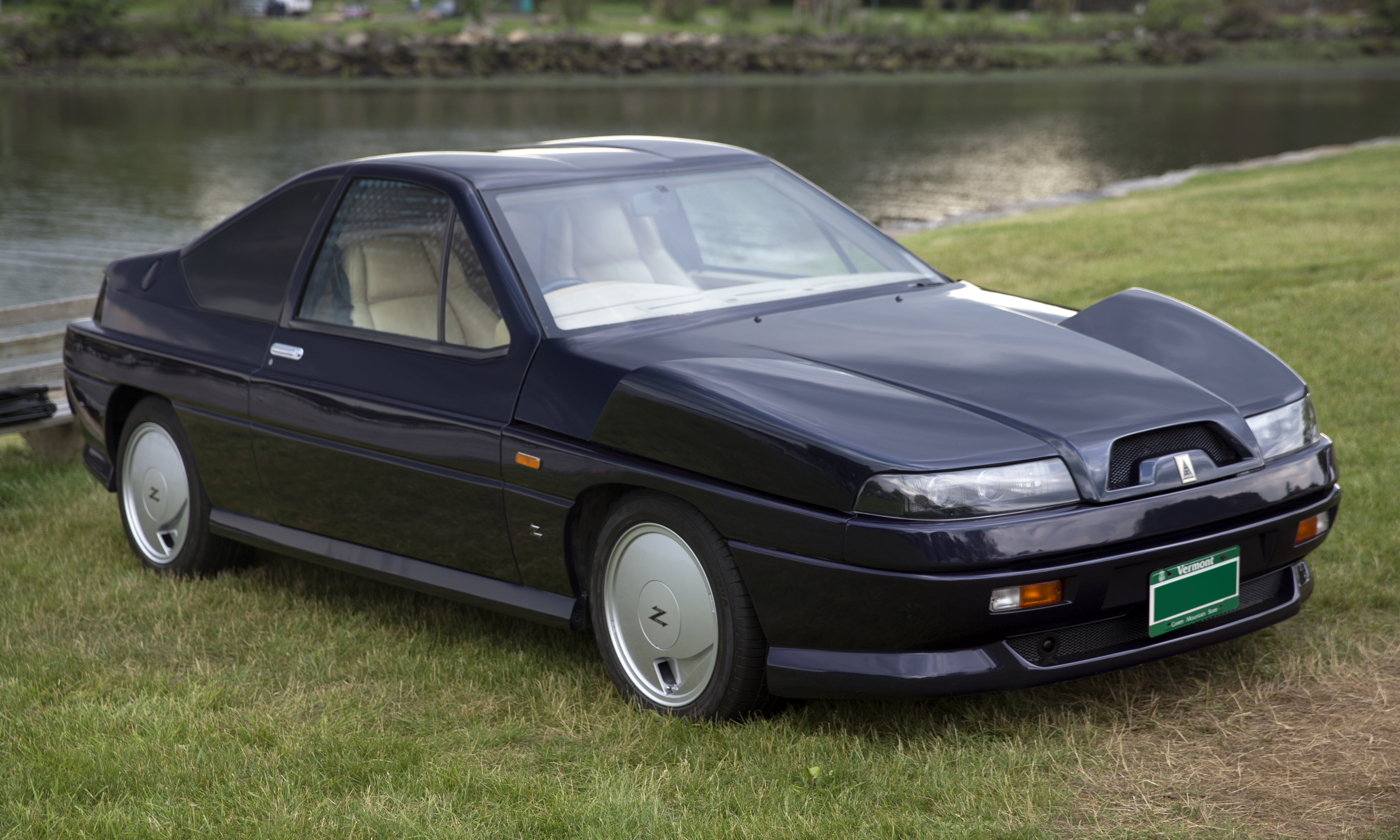

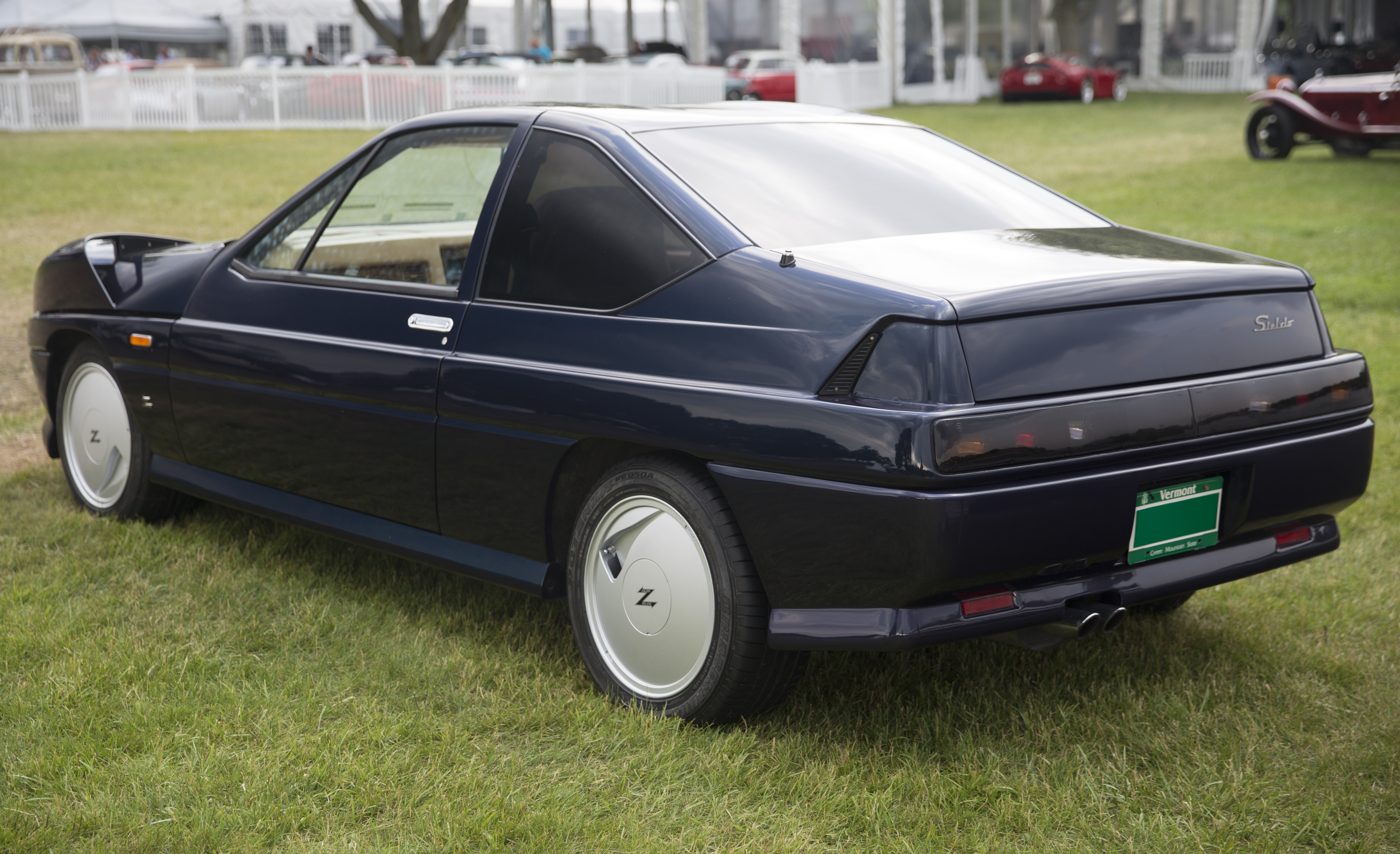
The Autech Zagato Stelvio AZ-1

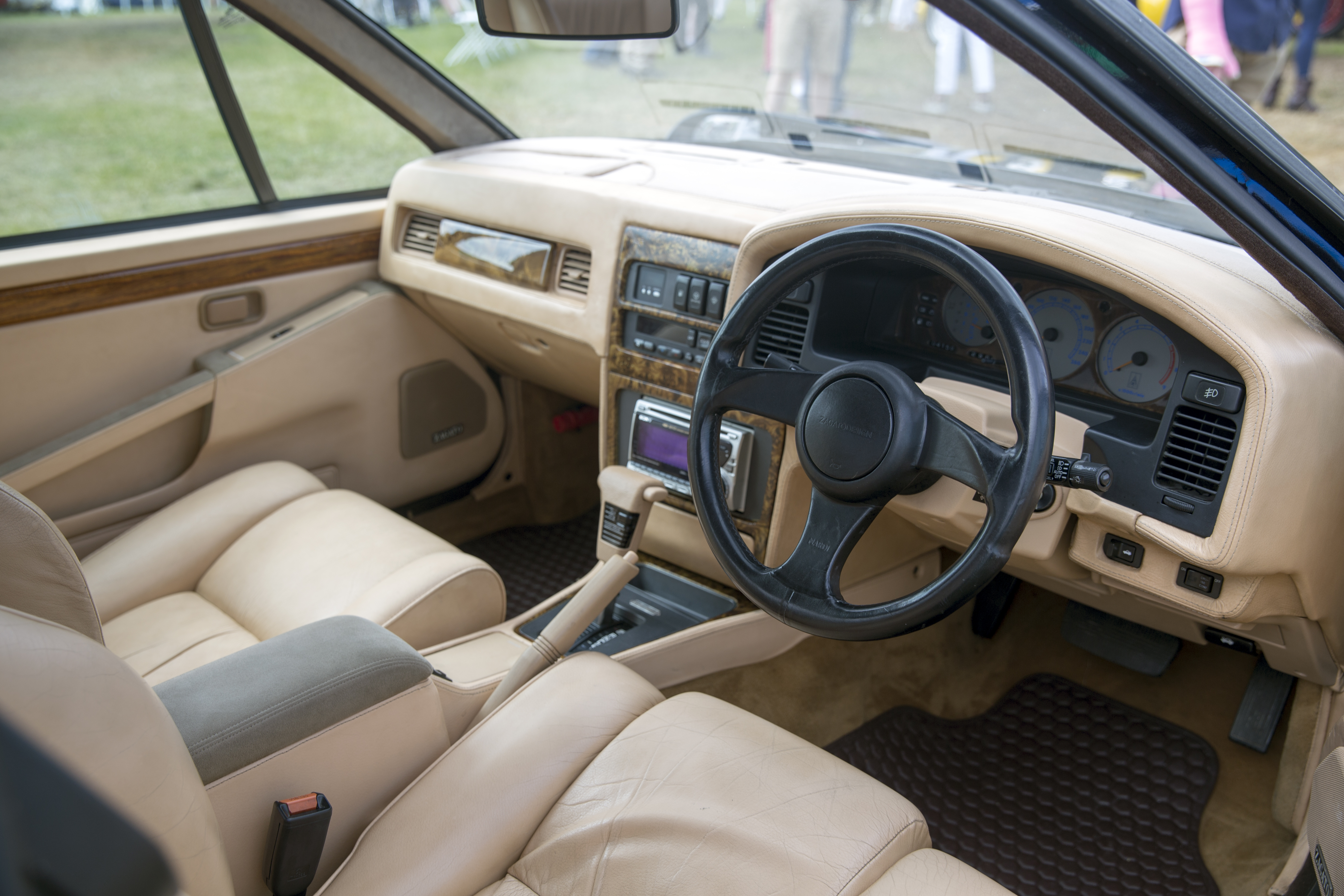
Interior

On 27 May 1987 Autech and the Italian company Zagato signed an agreement to jointly produce a luxury sports car aimed mainly at the Japanese market. Autech was responsible for the engine and chassis, and Zagato of the interior and exterior design. The new car used the platform of the Nissan Leopard and was called Autech Zagato Stelvio AZ1. It was unveiled in 1989, with 203 cars planned to be made (three of which were prototypes). Costs kept increasing during development and in the end 104 units were produced.

=== Merging with Nismo ===
In December 2021, Nissan said it would merge Autech and sister company Nismo (a motorsport operation) into a new company called Nissan Motorsports & Customizing Co., Ltd. (abbreviated as NMC). The merge was completed on 1 April 2022.

== Facilities ==
The head offices and factory are located in Chigasaki-shi, Kanagawa Prefecture. There are additional offices in Nagoya and Fukuoka and an ASEAN office in Bangkok, Thailand.

== Products ==
The main base vehicles are passenger cars, and each series adds value to the vehicle according to its respective customization concept. Specifically, there are the Rider series, which features aero parts to make the exterior sportier, and specially modified suspension parts to improve driving performance, as well as the Bolero and Axis series, which have been modified with interior and exterior parts to enhance luxury and sophistication.

Since 2017, Nissan has been announced the sporty sub-brands with two main products: the premium sporty oriented model AUTECH and the sports-oriented model NISMO.

Autech also modifies various vehicles to adapt them for use by disabled people and to meet the needs of different work areas. It also has tuned Nissan cars.

=== Autech ===
Along with the announcement of the AUTECH revival, it was also announced that the first model to be released would be the Serena, and it was announced on 12 January 2018, that it would be released on 1 February of the same year.

All Autech product were available in blue colour called the Autech Blue an exclusive blue-painted by Autech. According the Autech, the Blue colour is that it is inspired by the "sea and sky" of Shonan, Chigasaki-shi, which is the birthplace of the AUTECH.

==== Autech Bolero ====
The Autech Bolero is a retro-styled factory variant of the Nissan March, and adopted to the Nissan Dayz. Changes include a dark chrome front grille, 15-inch rally inspired wheels, and bi-tone paint options. As of 2026, The Dayz is the only Nissan car offered with Autech Bolero model.

===== Current Autech products =====
- Nissan Serena (C28) (Autech/Autech Line)
- Nissan Note (E13) (Autech Line/Autech Crossover)
- Nissan X-Trail (T33)
- Nissan Caravan (E26)
- Nissan Note Aura (FE13)
- Nissan Roox (BB2A/6A) (Autech Line)
- Nissan Leaf (ZE2)
- Nissan Elgrand (E53) (Autech/Autech Line)
- Nissan Dayz (BB4W) (Urban Chrome/Autech Bolero)
- Nissan Roox (Autech Line)
- Nissan Skyline (V37)

=== Highway STAR ===
Highway Star logo

The Highway Star (ハイウェイスター) is a higher trim for Nissan models. The first model to appear was the Largo Highway Star in August 1995. At the time, it was initially developed and produced by Autech Japan. These are generally positioned as higher-end trim levels, and the main difference from the standard grades mainly additional aerodynamic parts.

However, it became so popular that there was a long waiting list for orders. As a result, with the minor change in 1996, Nissan take over the Highway Star nameplate as the top trim line and the Highway Star model is produced in Nissan's own factory.

In 2009, Nissan expanded the Highway Star product range, primarily Kei car model. The Roox, was the first kei car to offer a Highway Star grade. Although the Roox is an OEM version of the Suzuki Palette.

Currently, Highway Star offers a range of products, especially minivan and kei car models, such as Nissan Serena, Nissan Dayz, and Nissan Dayz Roox.

=== Rider/Axis ===
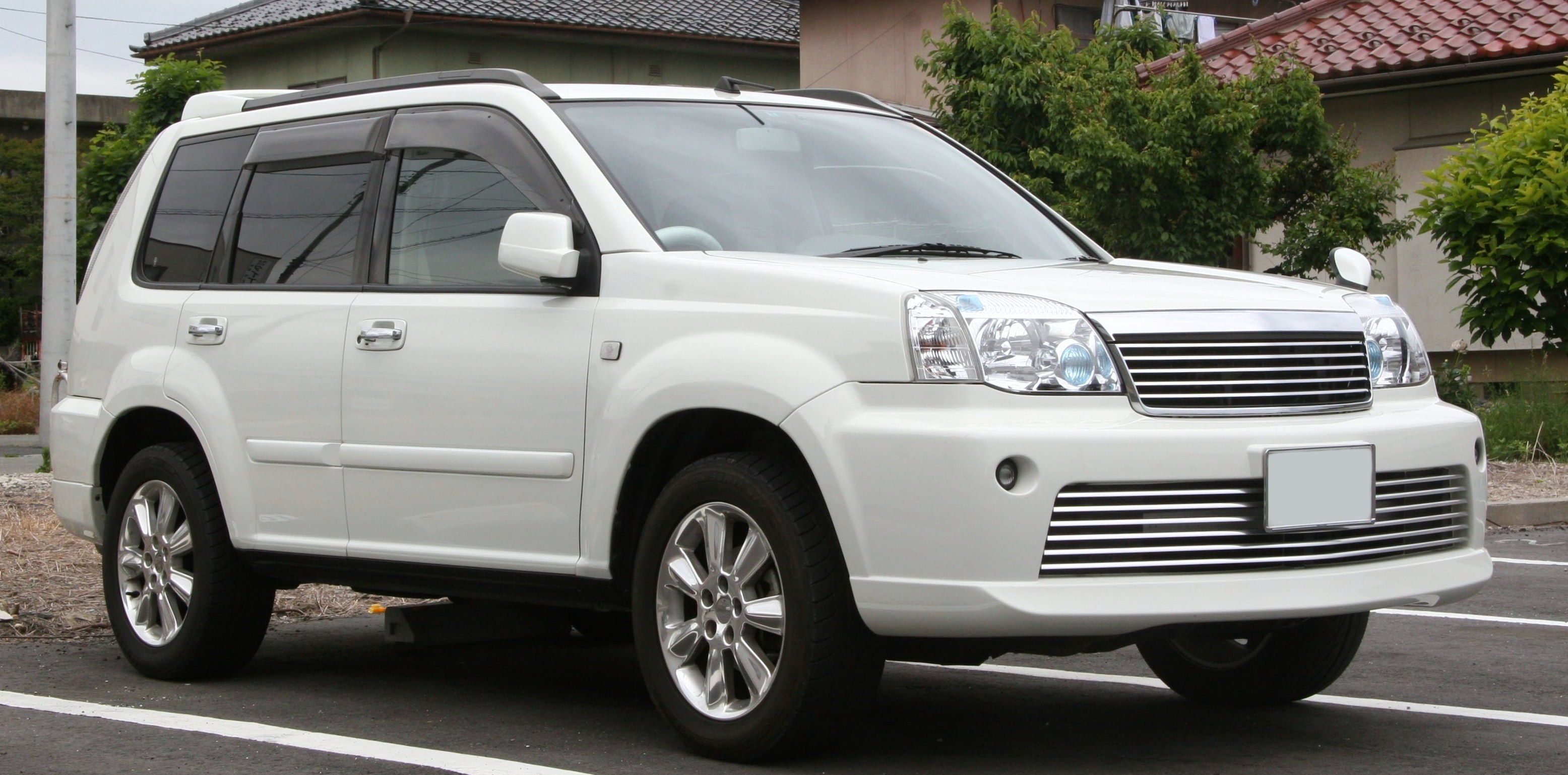
2003–2007 Nissan X-Trail Rider

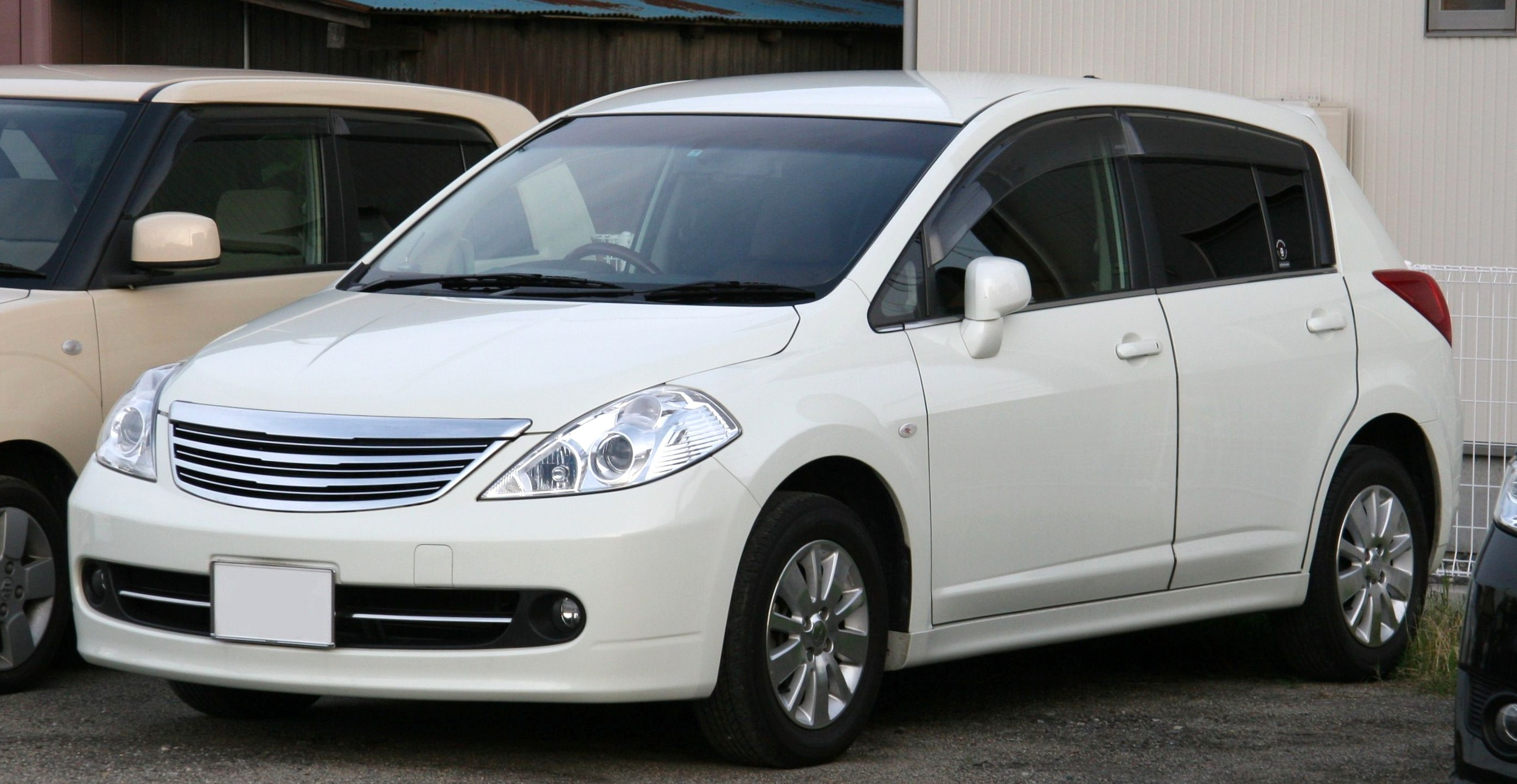
Nissan Tiida Axis

This sporty model features a billet grille and aerodynamic parts. All Rider models feature a metallic-looking exterior such as grille and are fitted with aerodynamic parts throughout the body. Booth Axis and Rider models lacks the Nissan emblem on the front fascia.

The Axis was very identicaly with the Rider models, but the front grille is more simplified and feature a genuine leather seats.

The first Autech Rider model is the first generation Cube which appeared in 1998. While the first Axis model R'nessa was debuted in 1997 more earlier.

=== Other Autech Products ===
VIP

- Nissan Fuga
- Nissan Cima
- Nissan Elgrand

Aero Style

- Nissan Leaf

S-Touring

- Nissan Sylphy

Chrome Gear Package

- NV350 Caravan

Extremer X Series

- X-Trail (T32)

Multi-bed

- Nissan NV200 Vanette
- Nissan Serena

Rock Creek

- Nissan X-Trail (T33)
- Nissan Kicks (P16)
- Nissan Roox

== Pre-2000s Autech models ==
=== Fully developed models ===
- Autech Zagato Stelvio (developed jointly with Zagato, based on the F31 Leopard)
- Autech Zagato Gavia (developed jointly with Zagato, based on the F31 Leopard)

=== Customization vehicles ===
- Skyline Autech Versions
  - R31: based on the 7th generation R31 2-door sports coupe GTS. Features a tuned RB20DET engine. Exterior features a special body colour and Volk-brand alloy wheels. Limited run appromexiately 200 units.
  - R32: Based on the four-door GTS-4, it was powered by the RB26DE engine, a naturally aspirated version of the RB26DETT. It was available only with an automatic transmission.
  - Autech Version 40th Anniversary: Combined the powertrain of the R33 GT-R with the body of the R33 four-door sedan. Total production was 416 units.
- Silvia Autech Versions
  - Silvia Convertible a limited run based on S13 Silvia limited run of 600 units.
  - Silvia Autech Version K's MF-T
  - Silvia Varietta a retractable hardtop variant of the S15 Silvia, and was based on the Spec-S model. In the same year Autech released the Silvia Autech Version.
- Nissan Stagea Autech Version 260RS
- Cefiro Autech Version (based on A31 and A33 Cefiro)
- Cedric Autech Version (based on Y31 Cedric)
- Kappa (based on the Nissan Vanette)
- Mermaid (based on the Vanette truck)
- Umibouzu, Yamaarashi (based on the Nissan Largo and Nissan Vanette)
- Suncat (based on the Vanette Serena)
- Addax 2 Wide / Wild Addax (based on the Datsun
- AJ Limited (based on the Terrano)
- Resort Express (based on the Avenir and Avenir Salut)
- Furaibow (based on the Caravan and Homy)
- Kitakitsune (based on the Serena and Liberty)
- Urban Resort (based on the Serena)
- Tango (a retro-styled based on the March)
- Desert Runner (based on the Terrano)
- Field Base (a campervan version based on the Safari, Terrano, and Elgrand)
- Skystar (based on the Nissan Datsun)
- King Cab (based on the Nissan Datsun)
- Astroad (based on the Terrano)
- VZ-R N1 (based on the Nissan Pulsar and Lucino)
- Yellow Version (based on the Cube)
- Rumba (a retro-styled based on the March)
- Classic Bus (a retro-styled based on the Nissan Civilian)
- Nissan Elgrand Jumbo Taxi
