= Nissan GA engine =

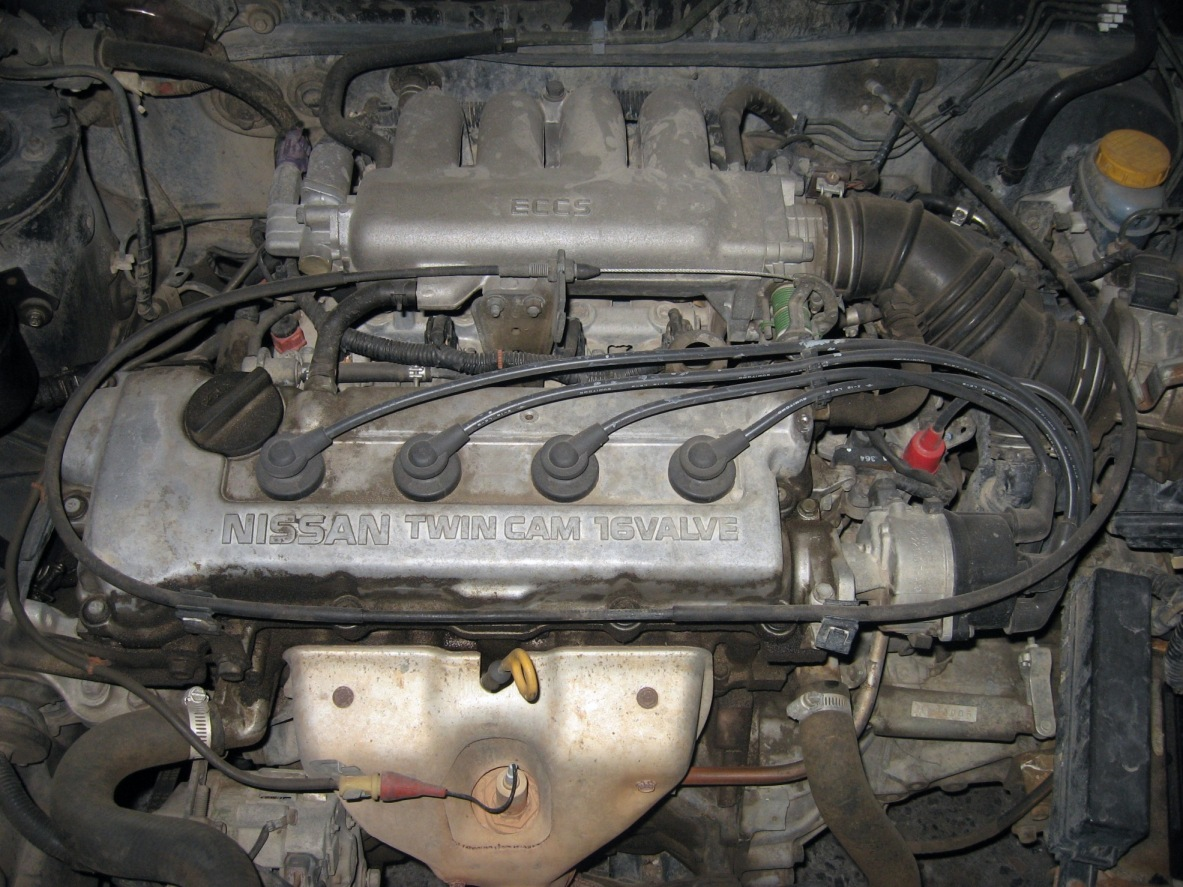

Overview
- Manufacturer: Nissan (Nissan Machinery)
- Production: 1987–2013

Layout
- Configuration: Naturally aspirated Inline-4
- Displacement: 1.3 L (1,295 cc); 1.4 L (1,392 cc); 1.5 L (1,497 cc); 1.6 L (1,597 cc)
- Cylinder bore: 71 mm (2.8 in); 73.6 mm (2.90 in); 76 mm (2.99 in)
- Piston stroke: 81.8 mm (3.22 in); 88 mm (3.46 in)
- Cylinder block material: Cast iron
- Cylinder head material: Aluminum
- Valvetrain: SOHC 2- or 3 valves x cyl.; DOHC 4 valves x cyl. with VVT (GA16DE)
- Compression ratio: 9.4:1

RPM range
- Max. engine speed: 7200

Combustion
- Fuel system: Carburetor; Multi-point fuel injection; Throttle-body fuel injection
- Fuel type: Gasoline
- Cooling system: Water-cooled

Output
- Power output: 55–86 kW (75–117 PS; 74–115 hp)
- Torque output: 104–146 N⋅m (77–108 lb⋅ft)

Emissions
- Emissions control systems: EGR, Catalytic converter, oxygen sensors

Chronology
- Predecessor: Nissan E engine
- Successor: Nissan QG engine

The GA engine is a 1.3 to 1.6 L inline-four piston engine from Nissan. It has a cast-iron block and an aluminum head. There are SOHC and DOHC versions, 8, 12, and 16 valve versions, carbureted, single-point, and multi-point injected versions, and versions with variable valve timing (GA16DE). The GA was produced from August 1987 through 2013. Since 1998, it was only available from Mexico in the B13.

In the code of the engine, the first two initials indicate engine class, the two numbers indicate engine displacement (in decilitres), the last two initials indicate cylinder-head style and induction type (D=DOHC, S=carburetor, E=injection). In the case of a single-initial suffix, the initial indicates induction type.

== GA13 ==
=== GA13S ===
The GA13S is a SOHC 1.3 L (1,295 cc) engine, carbureted, with 12 valves.

=== GA13DS ===
The GA13DS is a DOHC 1.3 L (1,295 cc) engine with a carburetor. It produces 86 PS (63 kW; 85 hp) at 6000 rpm and 104 N⋅m (77 lb⋅ft) at 3600 rpm. Bore and stroke are 71 mm × 81.8 mm (2.80 in × 3.22 in).

Applications:

- 1990 Nissan Sunny
- 1993 Nissan Sentra B13 series in LEC model (Philippines).
- 1998 Nissan Sentra B14 series in FE model (Philippines).
- 1994 Nissan AD

=== GA13DE ===
The GA13DE is a 1.3 L (1,295 cc) engine with DOHC and electronic gasoline injection. Bore and stroke are 71 mm × 81.8 mm (2.80 in × 3.22 in). It produces 85 PS (63 kW; 84 hp) at 6000 rpm and 109 N⋅m (80 lb⋅ft) at 4400 rpm. It was used in the 1995-1999 Nissan Sunny.

== GA14 ==
=== GA14S ===
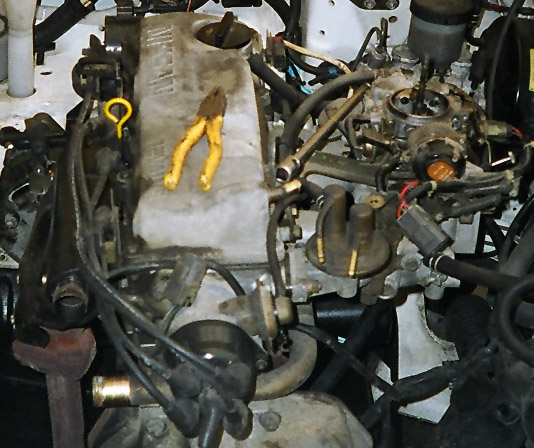
GA14S, filter housing removed, showing cast rocker cover typical of GA DOHC engines.

The GA14S is a 1.4 L (1,392 cc) engine, SOHC, carbureted, with 12 valves. It produces 79 hp (59 kW; 80 PS) at 6200 rpm and 111 N⋅m (82 lb⋅ft) at 4000 rpm. .It was used in the B12 Sentra and the N13 Sunny/Sentra. Compression ratio is 9.4:1.

=== GA14DS ===
The GA14DS is a 1.4 L (1,392 cc) 16V DOHC engine with carburetor and a 9.5:1 compression ratio. It produces 75 PS (55 kW; 74 hp) at 6000 rpm and 112 N⋅m (83 lb⋅ft) at 4000 rpm. Redline is at 6500 rpm. Catalyzed models come with electronically controlled carburetors. In this version the most common problem is the air/fuel ratio solenoid in the carburetor.

Applications:

- 1990-1998 Nissan Sunny N14
- 1990-1994 Nissan Sunny B13 (Export models)
- 1992-1995 Nissan Sentra B13 Series JX and EX models (Philippines).
- 1996-1997 Nissan Sentra B14 series EX models (Philippines).

=== GA14DE ===
The GA14DE is a 1.4 L (1,392 cc) 16V DOHC fuel injection engine. The bore x stroke is the same as for other GA14 family engines: 73.6 mm × 81.8 mm (2.90 in × 3.22 in). It produces 87 PS (64 kW; 86 hp) at 6000 rpm and 116 N⋅m (86 lb⋅ft) at 4000 rpm. Redline is at 7200 rpm.

Applications:

- 1992-1995 Nissan Sunny N14
- 1996-2000 Nissan Sentra B14 series EX models (Philippines)
- 1999 Nissan Sentra (South Africa)
- 1995-2001 Almera/Pulsar N15

== GA15 ==
The GA15 family displaces 1.5 L (1,497 cc) engine from a bore and stroke of 73.6 mm (2.90 in) and 88 mm (3.46 in) respectively.

=== GA15S ===
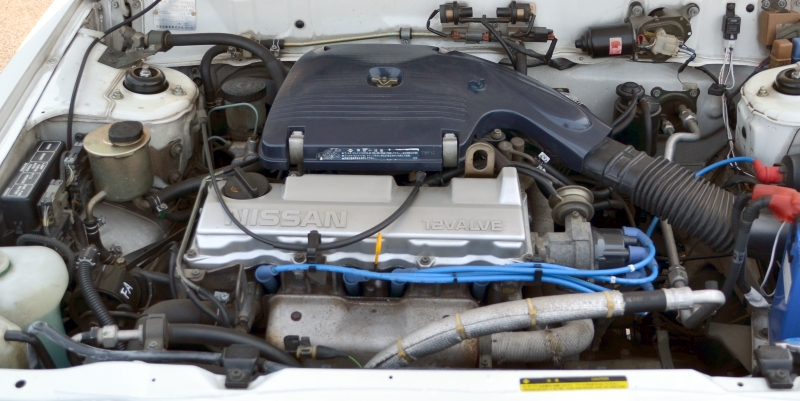
Nissan GA15S engine

The GA15S is a SOHC 1.5 L (1,497 cc) engine, carbureted, with 12 valves. It produces 85 PS (63 kW; 84 hp) at 6000 rpm and 123 N⋅m (91 lb⋅ft) at 3600 rpm.

=== GA15DS ===
The GA15DS is a 1.5 L (1,497 cc) 16V DOHC engine with a carburetor. It produces 94 PS (69 kW; 93 hp) at 6000 rpm and 126 N⋅m (93 lb⋅ft) at 3600 rpm.

Applications:

- 1990-1993 Nissan Sunny
- 1990-1993 Nissan Pulsar
- 1990-1994 Nissan NX Coupé (JDM)
- 1990-1997 Nissan Wingroad & AD van.

=== GA15E ===
The GA15E is a 1.5 L (1,497 cc) multi point fuel injected SOHC engine. It produces 97 PS (71 kW; 96 hp) at 6000 rpm and 128 N⋅m (94 lb⋅ft) at 4400 rpm. It was used in the Nissan Pulsar, including such models as the 1988 X1-E Milano (JDM).

=== GA15DE ===
The GA15DE is a 1.5 L (1,497 cc) engine with DOHC 16-valves (4 per cylinder) and electronic multi-point fuel injection. It was introduced in December 1993 and uses Nissan's ECCS engine control system admission. In Japanese market passenger car specification it produces 105 PS (77 kW; 104 hp) at 6000 rpm and 135 N⋅m (100 lb⋅ft) at 4000 rpm. Commercial vehicle-spec engines (AD Van) produce 100 PS (74 kW; 99 hp) at 6000 rpm and 127 N⋅m (94 lb⋅ft) at 4000 rpm.

Applications:

- 1995-1998 B14 Nissan Sunny
- 1995-2000 N15 Nissan Pulsar/Nissan Lucino, R11 Nissan Presea (JDM)
- 1994-2000 Nissan Rasheen
- 1995-1999 Y10 Nissan Wingroad/Nissan AD Van
- 1997-1999 Subaru Leone Van (rebadged Y10)
- 1997-1999 Mazda Familia Van (rebadged Y10)

== GA16 ==
=== GA16S ===
The GA16S is a 1.6 L (1,597 cc) SOHC engine with a bore and stroke of 76 mm × 88 mm (2.99 in × 3.46 in). The GA16S has twelve valves, solid valve rockers, and is fitted with a carburetor. It produces 95 PS (70 kW; 94 hp) (without a catalyst). For some markets, such as South Africa, there was also an eight-valve version which produces 85 PS (63 kW; 84 hp) at 5500 rpm. In the New Zealand market N13 Sentra, it produces 92 hp (69 kW; 93 PS) at 6000 rpm and 133 N⋅m (98 lb⋅ft) at 3200 rpm, with a compression ratio of 9.4:1.

=== GA16DS ===
The GA16DS is a 1.6 L (1,597 cc) carbureted only engine with a 16-valve DOHC head. Models equipped with a catalyst use the electronically controlled carburetor. It produces between 89 hp (66 kW; 90 PS) and 95 hp (71 kW; 96 PS). Without catalyst produces 95 hp (71 kW; 96 PS).

Applications

- 1990-1993 Nissan Primera (P10)
- 1990-1993 Nissan Sunny (N14)
- 1990-1995 Nissan Sunny Traveller (Y10)
- 1990-1993 Nissan 100NX (B13)
- 1990-1997 Nissan Avenir Cargo (VEW10)
- 1992-1996 Nissan Bluebird (U13)

This engine was also fitted to the Nissan Sunny B13 from Japan, called the EX Saloon.

=== GA16i ===
The GA16i is a 1.6 L (1,597 cc) throttle-body fuel-injected engine produced from August 1987 through June 1990, which produces 90 hp (67 kW; 91 PS). It is a single-cam, 12-valve design, with manually adjustable rocker arms. 1989 and 1990 North-American market Sentras (and European N13 Sunnys) received the hydraulic-rocker version which produces 92 hp (69 kW; 93 PS) and 130 N⋅m (96 lb⋅ft) of torque.

Applications:

- 1989-1990 Nissan Sentra
- 1989-1990 Nissan Pulsar

=== GA16E ===
The GA16E is a 1.6 L (1,597 cc) multi-point fuel injected SOHC engine. It produces 110 hp (82 kW; 112 PS).

=== GA16DE ===
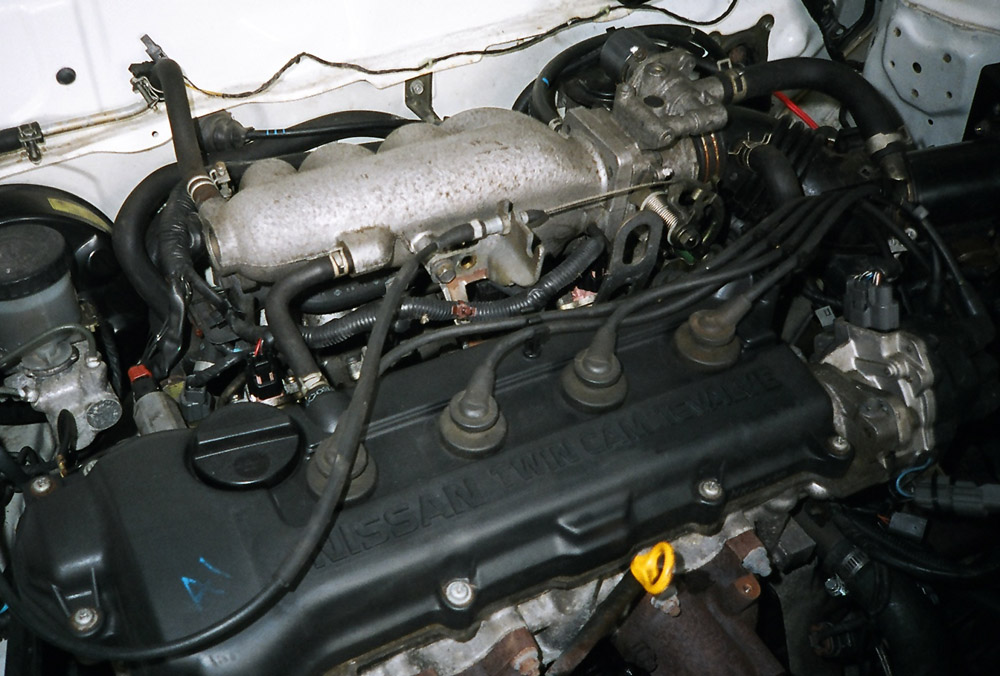
GA16DE with NVCS, showing plastic valve cover typical of second-generation GA16DE engines. The bulge on left covers NVCS mechanism. The top of non-siamesed exhaust manifold just visible.

The GA16DE is a 1.6 L (1,597 cc) engine produced from November 1990 through 1999. All GA16DEs have 16 valves and a DOHC head. There are three versions: the North-American first-generation (1991–1994) NVCS (VTC), which produces 110 hp (82 kW; 112 PS) at 6000 rpm and 146 N⋅m (108 lb⋅ft) at 4000 rpm, the North-American second-generation (1995-1999) NVCS (VTC), which produces 115 hp (86 kW; 117 PS) at 6000 rpm and 146 N⋅m (108 lb⋅ft) at 4000 rpm, and a European non-NVCS (VTC) version which makes 102 PS (75 kW; 101 hp).

The two variants of the North American NVCS engine are distinguished as such: in addition to differences in the intake manifolds and (resultantly) the heads, earlier motors used pistons with two compression rings and a single oil ring and put out five less horsepower, while later GA16DEs have a single compression ring and a single oil ring. Some engines have siamesed exhaust manifolds, while others keep the exhausts separated until the catalytic converter.

The GA16DE shares its block and crankshaft with the GA16i; however, their timing chain covers, connecting rods and pistons are different. Despite this, it is possible to interchange connecting-rod/piston assemblies between the GA16i and GA16DE with no damage to the valve-train.

Earlier ECUs contained the fuel & ignition maps on a discrete ROM microcontroller, making retuning relatively easy. Later ECUs integrated the maps onto a larger, more integrated microcontroller's firmware, making retuning require the use of a daughterboard.

Applications:

- 1993-1996 Nissan NX1600 B13
- 1991-1994 Nissan Sentra B13
- 1994-1995 Nissan 100NX B13 (UK)
- 1991-1994 Nissan Presea R10
- 1995-1999 Nissan Sentra B14
- 1995-1999 Nissan 200SX B14
- 1995-1999 Nissan Almera N15
- 1990-1999 Nissan Pulsar N14/N15
- 1993-1999 Nissan Primera P10/P11
- 10/1992-07/1995 Nissan Sunny Traveller (Y10)
- 1999-2001 Nissan Exalta (Philippines)
- 1995-1999 Nissan Vanette Cargo.

=== GA16DNE ===
GA16DNE, front (Super Touring Sentra)

The GA16DNE is a Mexican-specification 1.6 L (1,597 cc) engine, which produces 105 hp (78 kW; 106 PS). The main differences between the DE and DNE are no NVCS (VTC) and no ECCS plenum. The DNE has a vertical throttle body with an MAF inside; the air filter is diagonally oriented in its air filter housing. Since 2003, the DNE comes with a new ECU and 3 oxygen sensors.

The "N" in its nomenclature stands for "New EGI" (emission system), since this engine does not have an EGR system like the GA16DE. Other Nissan engines with the "N" nomenclature are natural gas powered.

Applications:

- 1998-2004 Nissan Tsubame Y10 (Mexico)
- 1996-2000 Nissan Sentra B14
- 1996-2000 Nissan Sentra B14 Super Saloon/Super Touring/GST
- 1998-2017 Nissan Tsuru B13
- 1998-2002 Nissan Sentra N14 (South Africa)
- 1998-2002 Nissan Sabre N14 (South Africa)
- 1996-1999 Nissan Sentra B14 (Philippines)
- 1996-1999 Nissan Sentra B14 (Malaysia)
- 1995-1999 Nissan Serena C23 (European)

== See also ==
- List of Nissan engines
