= Nissan NX =

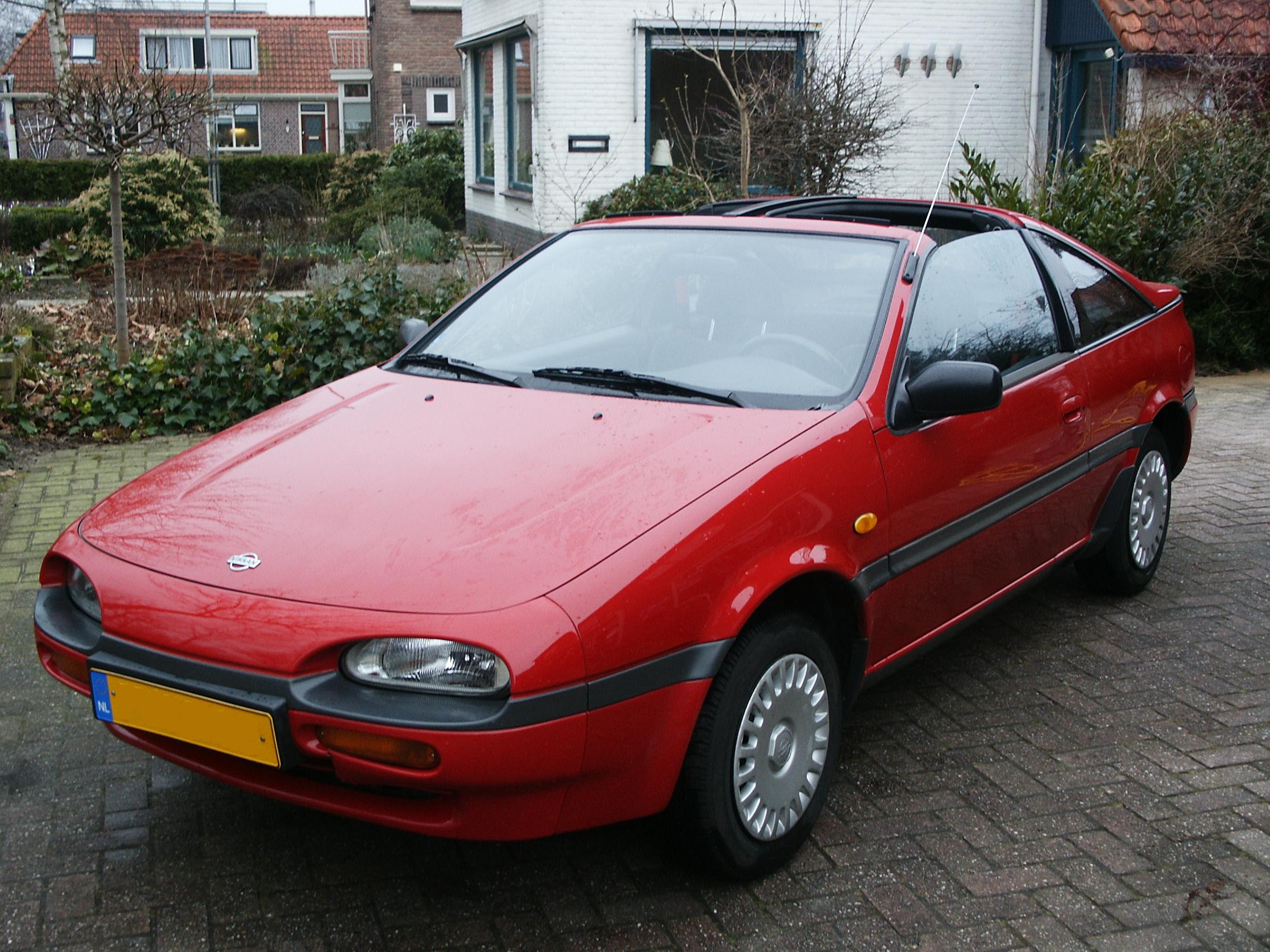
- Nissan 100NX 1.6 T-bar roof in The Netherlands.

Overview
- Manufacturer: Nissan
- Model code: B13
- Also called: Nissan 100NX (Europe); Nissan NX Coupé (Australia/New Zealand/Asia); Nissan NX1600/2000 (North America); Nissan Sunny NX Coupé (Japan)
- Production: 1990–1996
- Assembly: Oppama Plant, Yokosuka, Kanagawa, Japan
- Designer: Jerry Hirshberg

Body and chassis
- Class: Sports car Sport compact
- Body style: 2-door coupé 2-door Targa top
- Layout: FF layout
- Related: Nissan Sentra (B13); Nissan Sunny (B13); Nissan Pulsar (N14); Nissan Wingroad (Y10)

Powertrain
- Engine: 1.5 L GA15DS I4 (Japan); 1.6 L GA16DS/DE I4; 1.8 L SR18DE I4 (Japan); 2.0 L SR20DE I4
- Transmission: 4-speed automatic; 5-speed manual

Dimensions
- Wheelbase: 2,430 mm (96 in)
- Length: 4,135–4,140 mm (163–163 in)
- Width: 1,680 mm (66 in)
- Height: 1,310–1,315 mm (52–52 in)
- Curb weight: 940–1,150 kg (2,070–2,540 lb)

Chronology
- Predecessor: Nissan Pulsar NX/EXA; Nissan Sunny RZ-1; Nissan Sentra Sport Coupe
- Successor: Nissan 200SX (North America); Nissan Lucino (Japan)

The Nissan NX is a front wheel drive 2-door sports car produced by Nissan Motors. The NX was, loosely, an evolution of the Nissan Pulsar NX/Nissan EXA sold from 1987 to 1990 and the Nissan Sunny Coupe lines of the 1970s and 1980s, merging the Nissan B13 and N14 lineages. The NX was released in Japan in 1990.

== Models ==
=== NX1600/NX2000 (North America) ===
The NX1600 was based on the standard 1.6-litre third generation Sentra (engine code GA16DE), and the NX2000 was based on the 2.0 L SE-R model (engine code SR20DE). Most models were fitted with T-Tops, while the remainder were hardtops. Constructed in Japan, it was sold from 1991 to 1993 in the US (mainly competing with the Mazda MX-3, Isuzu Impulse, Toyota MR2, and Honda Civic del Sol). It was produced for a few more years for other countries. Its body was designed at NDI (Nissan Design International) in San Diego under the direction of NDI President Jerry Hirshberg, Blue Studio Chief Designer Allan Flowers, and staff designers Bruce Campbell and Doug Wilson.

The NX2000 model included some mechanical improvements over its SE-R sibling in the form of larger brakes and more aggressive tires on wider 6-inch wheels (195/55VR-14 with 14x6-inch wheels vs. the 185/60HR-14 with 14x5.5-inch wheels and tires in the SE-R). The NX2000 brakes are a common aftermarket upgrade for B13 Sentra SE-Rs. The NX2000 also had a center armrest, a larger two-core radiator, and slightly lower ride height compared to the SE-R. However, the T-top roof in the NX2000 along with the mechanical upgrades made it slightly heavier than the SE-R.

The NX2000, with its light weight, stiff chassis, and limited-slip differential, was considered one of the best-handling front-wheel-drive cars of the time. In 1992, Road & Track magazine included the NX2000 in a test of the world's best-handling cars against such competition as the Acura NSX, Porsche 911, Nissan 300ZX, Mazda Miata, and Lotus Elan.

=== 100NX (Europe) ===
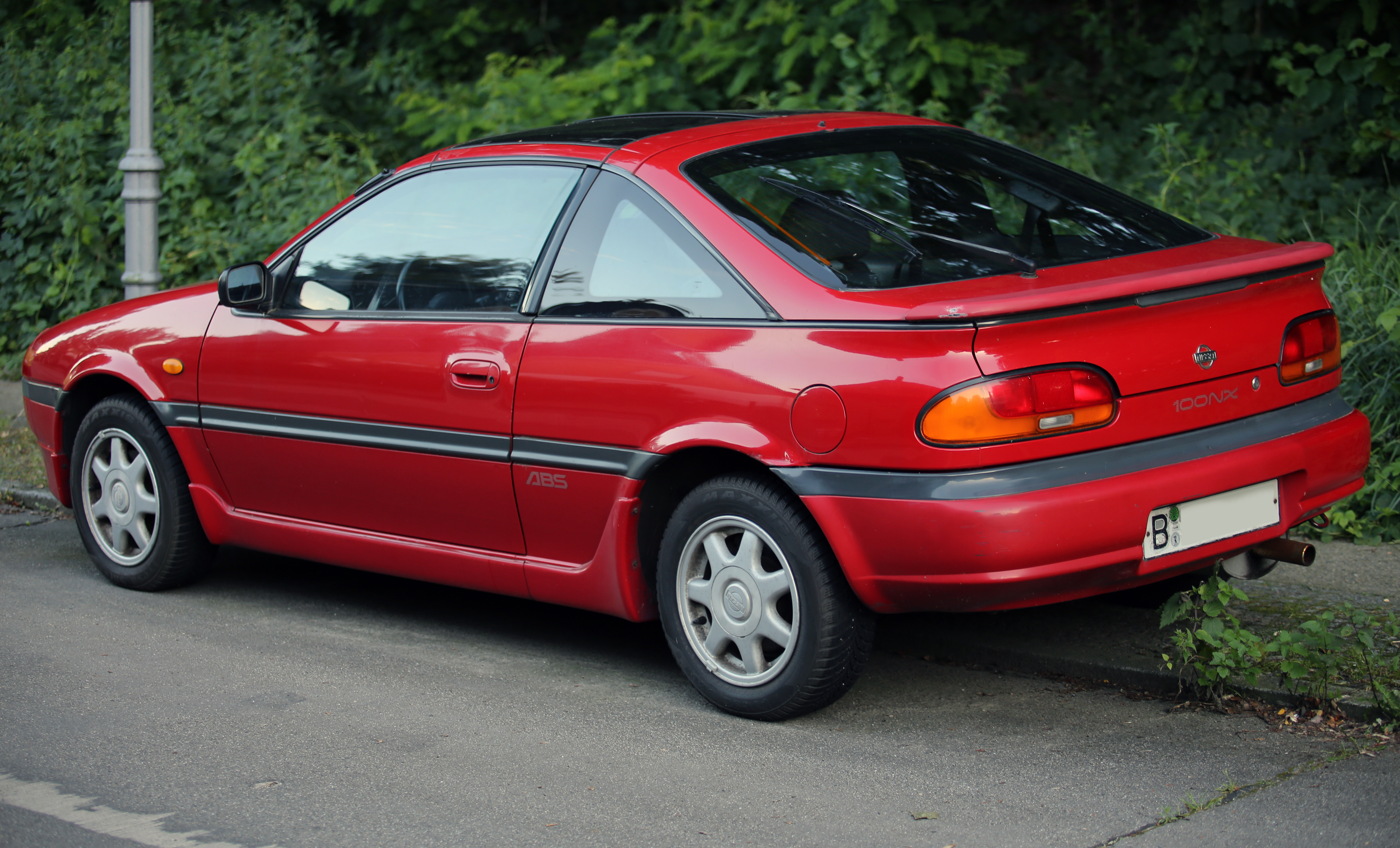
Rear view of a Nissan 100NX 2.0 16V T-bar (Germany)

The 100NX came with two engine options, a 1.6 L and a 2.0 L.

The 1.6 liter, made from 1990 to February 1993 had a carburetor fitted which tended to consume excessive fuel as it aged. From April 1993 to 1996, the 100NX was sold with a more efficient fuel injected setup. In November 1993 a version called the SR appeared. This stands for "Steel Roof" as this slightly sportier model was lighter and more rigid. The SR's engine produced somewhat more power than the regular GA16DS thanks to a modified control unit and an enlarged intake manifold. The gearing was also shorter than for the regular 1.6.

- 1.6 with ECU carbureted — 90 PS (66 kW; 89 hp)
- 1.6 Non ECU carbureted — 95 PS (70 kW; 94 hp)
- 1.6 fuel injected — 90 PS (66 kW; 89 hp)
- 1.6 fuel injected — 102 PS (75 kW; 101 hp) SR model
- 2.0 fuel injected — 140 bhp (104 kW; 142 PS) North American version
- 2.0 fuel injected — 143 PS (105 kW; 141 hp)

The 1.6 liter fuel injected version achieved 0–60 mph (0–97 km/h) in 10.5 seconds and had a top speed of 121 mph (195 km/h).

The 100NX was mainly sold with a T-bar removable roof in Europe although this does vary from country to country. Specialised Badged Editions sold only in 1995 include the "Pacific" in Ireland and the United Kingdom and the "Sail" in the Netherlands. Features vary from country to country, such features include heated seats, electric windows, other differences although rarer include cup holders, umbrella holder embedded in the driver's side B-pillar, and headlight wipers.

=== 100NX (UK) ===
The Nissan 100NX was initially introduced in the UK in April 1991 as part of the Nissan Pulsar range replacing the Nissan Sunny 1.6 GSX Coupe. At this time Nissan UK, the British importer were in a heated dispute with Nissan Motor Corporation over profit margins. In an attempt to deliberately shrink market share Nissan UK launched the entire Pulsar range with no promotion as well as only providing a limited colour range and pricing all models well above their position in the market. At launch the 100NX was only available with the 1.6L 95 PS carburetor engine, and in a basic specification, priced at £14,585, the same price as a 2.0 L Toyota MR2 and £1,000 more than the 2.0L Honda Prelude. T-bar roof and automatic transmission were optional. In January 1992 Nissan Motor Corporation set up their own importer (Nissan Motor (GB) LTD) and relaunched the entire Nissan Range, the 100NX now coming with alloy wheels, T-bar roof and front foglights as standard at a lower price of £11,817 and was available in a full range of colours.

From February 1993 to 1996, the 100NX the carburetor engine was replaced by a more efficient fuel injected setup.

- 1.6 Non-ECU carbureted — 89 bhp (66 kW; 90 PS)
- 1.6 fuel injected — 101 bhp (75 kW; 102 PS)

=== Sunny NX Coupé (Japan) ===
The Nissan NX was also sold in the Japanese domestic market as the Nissan Sunny NX Coupé. Some models were fitted with T-Tops, whilst others were hardtop. The Japanese domestic Sunny NX Coupés came with either a 1.5 DOHC carburetted engine (GA15(DS)), a 1.6 DOHC EFI engine (GA16(DE)), a 1.8 DOHC EFI engine (SR18(DE)) or the rare 2.0 DOHC EFI engine (SR20DE). The model was available in automatic or manual transmission. The 1.5 DOHC models were all fitted with digital speedometers, whilst all other engine versions had the standard analogue gage. All Japanese domestic models were fitted with electric windows, air conditioning, power steering, electric mirrors and central locking which locked the doors automatically at 18 km/h whilst driving, and was exclusive to Nissan Cherry Store Japanese dealerships.

=== NX Coupé/NX-R (Australia) ===
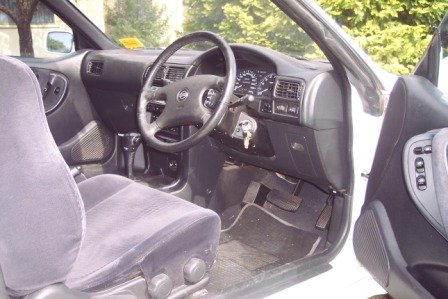
Interior

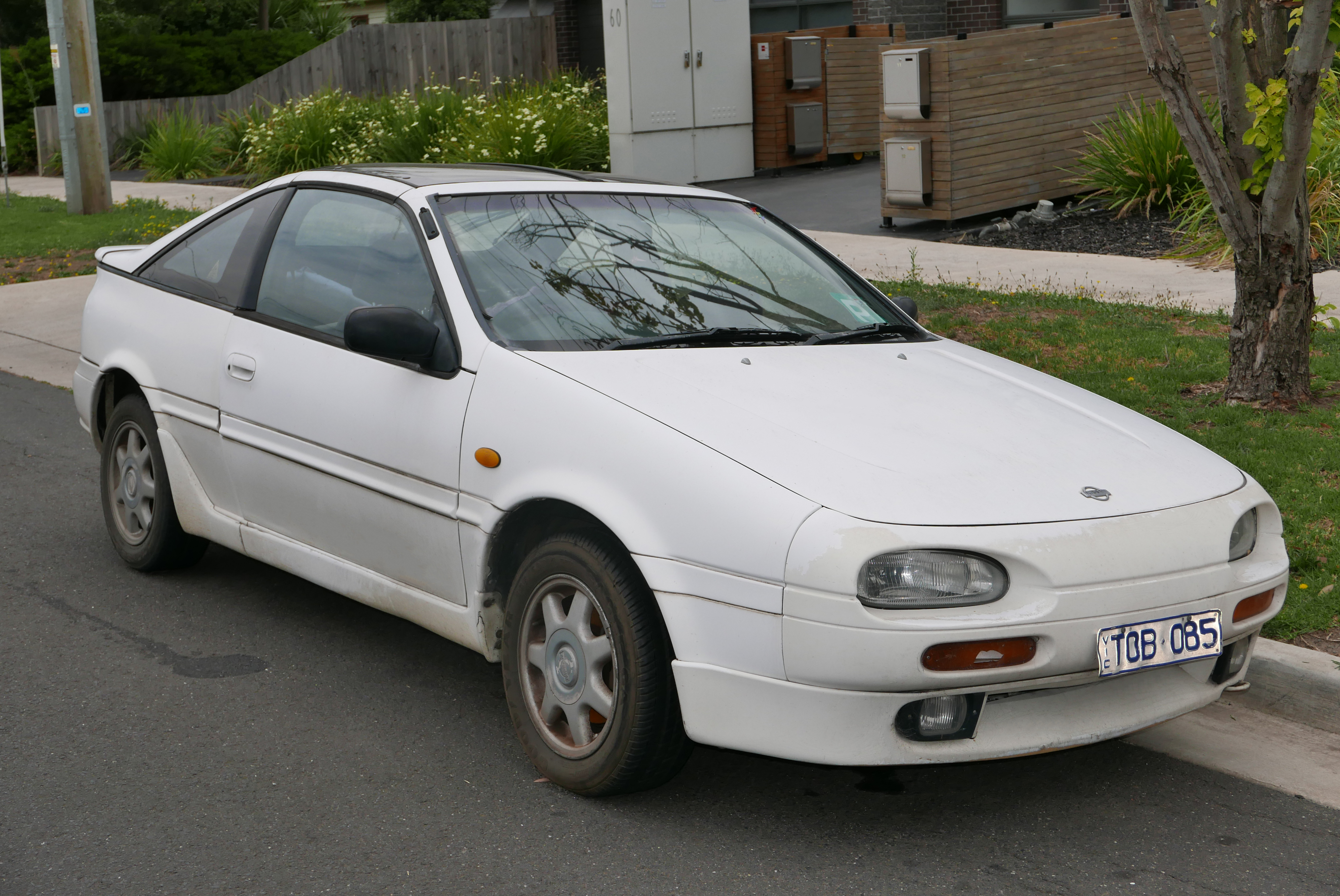
Nissan NX-R (B13) in Australia.

The Nissan NX was sold in the Australian market as the Nissan NX Coupé. A range topping model known as the NX-R included an added front lip with fog/driving lights, side skirts, lip rear spoiler, 14-inch alloy wheels (N14 SSS Pulsar), cruise control, leather-wrapped steering wheel and shift knob, electric windows and ABS (Anti-lock Braking System). Both models were only ever offered with the powerful 105 kW/178Nm 2.0L naturally aspirated inline 4-cylinder engine (SR20DE). The NX also came with a choice between a 4-speed automatic gearbox or a 5-speed manual. No LSD (Limited-Slip Differential) was offered in Australia for the NX range. It has a claimed 0–100 km/h (62 mph) acceleration time of 8.2 seconds and with a combined fuel consumption figure of just 8.4L/100 km would be considered above average.

== Safety ==
In Australia, the 1991-94 Nissan NX was assessed in the Used Car Safety Ratings 2006 as providing "significantly worse than average" protection for its occupants in the event of a crash.

== Engines ==
Region	Engine Code	Power	Torque	Notes
Japan	GA15DS	94 PS (69 kW; 93 hp)	126 N⋅m (93 lb⋅ft)	Carbureted
Europe/Japan	GA16DS	96 PS (71 kW; 95 hp)	132 N⋅m (97 lb⋅ft)	Carbureted
Europe	GA16DE	102 PS (75 kW; 101 hp)	136 N⋅m (100 lb·ft)	Without NVCS
Japan/North America	GA16DE	112 PS (82 kW; 110 hp)	146 N⋅m (108 lb·ft)	With NVCS, First Generation (1990-1994)
Japan/North America	GA16DE	117 PS (86 kW; 115 hp)	127 N⋅m (94 lb·ft)	With NVCS, Second Generation (1995-1996)
Japan	SR18DE	140 PS (103 kW; 138 hp)	167 N⋅m (123 lb·ft)	
Europe/Japan/North America/Oceania	SR20DE	143 PS (105 kW; 141 hp)	178 N⋅m (131 lb·ft)	

== Racing ==
=== Land speed records ===
2011
Reg Cook Motorsport set a new Class G/PRO world record land speed class record at Bonneville speed week of 279.24 km/h (174.525 mph), using a Nissan NX Coupe with a 2.0 L SR20 engine.

=== North America ===
==== SCCA Showroom Stock B ====
Soon after its import into the United States, the NX2000 was classified by the Sports Car Club of America (SCCA) into its Showroom Stock B category for the 1992 year, pitting it against such cars as Mitsubishi Mirage Turbo (defending SSB champion Gerald Alaimo and others), its B13 cousin the Nissan Sentra SE-R (David Daughtery and others), and the sole second-generation Toyota MR2 (driven by Dane Pitaressi). The NX2000 posted several National wins throughout the year, and garnered much attention from competitors. The 1992 SSB SCCA Runoffs championships saw two podium finishes for the NX2000, with the gold medal taken home by Mark Youngquist, followed by Ken Payson in a Mirage, then Greg Amy in his NX2000 taking home third place.

The 1993 season proved it wasn't a fluke, as David Daughtery took home yet another SCCA Runoffs championship for the NX2000. However, by that time the 1993 MR-2 with its updated suspension and the much-improved S14 version of the Nissan 240SX came along; while the NX2000 continued to be campaigned nationally, and sporadically posted wins throughout subsequent racing seasons, it never again won a Runoffs championship (Tony Suever won in '94 with the MR-2, and the '95 and '96 SSB championships were won by Daughtery in the S14 240SXh.) The car timed out for eligibility for SSB racing soon thereafter.

==== SCCA Improved Touring ====
The Nissan NX2000 and the Sentra SE-R were soon approved for SCCA's Improved Touring category. At the time of its initial classification - due primarily to their larger (2.0-liter) displacement - they were dropped into the ITS, or Sports, class. This pitted them against other larger-displacement, GT-class cars such as the Mazda RX-7 and BMW 325. The cars languished in ITS for several years; despite a few sporadic oddball wins in ITS ("Crazy Joe" DiMinno in his Sentra SE-R at Watkins Glen International in the rain in 2003) due to its very low chances of winning it garnered very little interest from competitors. Further, despite numerous requests from SCCA competitors it was never re-classified into a lower class (such as ITA, with the Acura Integra, Honda CRX Si, Saturn SC, etc.).

In 2001, Kakashi Racing from Connecticut began to prepare both a Nissan NX2000 for former SSB driver Greg Amy and provide support for DiMinno in his Sentra (the NX of Greg Amy was the same chassis he used in the '92 Runoffs). At the same time they began an effort to convince SCCA that the car belonged in ITA. They coordinated efforts with Kirk Knestis to form a sub-group called "Improved Touring 2" to bring attention to the "orphaned" 2-liter front-wheel-drive cars languishing in ITS. In 2004 SCCA announced a complete re-vamp of the IT classification process, placing both Nissan B13 cars into ITA for the 2005 racing season. The end result was a 2006 American Road Race of Champions (ARRC) ITA win at Road Atlanta for Greg Amy and Kakashi Racing.

Due to this success the car has again garnered a lot of attention from competitors, and a resurgence of entries for both the NX2000 and Sentra SE-R in Improved Touring is expected.

==== Professional Race Series ====
- 1991: Richard Laporte and others. Firestone Firehawk Endurance Championship class T, 5th overall.
- 1992: Richard Laporte, Pierre Desmarais and others. Firestone Firehawk Endurance Championship class T, 3rd and 4th overall.
- 1994: Thomas Thorman, Jose Luis Pombo. SCCA World Challenge World Challenge Super Production.
- 1995: Thomas Thorman. SCCA World Challenge World Challenge Super Production.
