= Prairie (disambiguation) =

A prairie is a type of temperate grassland.

Prairie may also refer to:

== Places ==
=== Australia ===
- Prairie, Queensland
- Prairie, Victoria

=== Canada ===
- The Prairies, or Canadian Prairies, the provinces of Alberta, Saskatchewan, and Manitoba
- Prairies Ecozone, a region in the southern areas of Canada's prairie provinces

=== United States ===
- Prairie, Alabama
- Prairie, Illinois
- Prairie, Mississippi
- Prairie, Washington

== Arts and entertainment ==
- The Prairie, an 1827 novel by James Fenimore Cooper
- The Prairie (film), a 1947 American Western, an adaptation of Cooper's novel
- Prairie Dawn, a Sesame Street character
- Prairie Johnson, a character in the Netflix series The OA
- Prairie, a character in the video game Mega Man ZX

== Transportation ==
- 2-6-2, or Prairie, a type of steam locomotive
- Nissan Prairie, an automobile
- USS Prairie, two ships of the US Navy

== Other uses ==
- Prairie School, an architectural style
- The Prairie School (Wind Point, Wisconsin), a preK-12 private school in Wind Point, Wisconsin, US

== See also ==
- La Prairie (disambiguation)
  - Laprairie (disambiguation)
- Prairie High School (disambiguation)
- Prairie Mountain, Washington, US
- Prairie Mountain (Alberta), Canada
- Prairie River (disambiguation)
- Prairie Township (disambiguation)
- American prairie (disambiguation)
