= La Prairie =

La Prairie or LaPrairie, may refer to:

== Places ==
Canada

- La Prairie, Quebec
  - Fort Laprairie, a French colonial fort from New France, the site now located in the city of the same name
- La Prairie (federal electoral district)
- La Prairie (provincial electoral district)

United States

- La Prairie, Illinois
- La Prairie Township, Marshall County, Illinois
- La Prairie, Minnesota
- La Prairie Township, Clearwater County, Minnesota
- La Prairie, Wisconsin
- La Prairie Center, Illinois

== People ==
- Bun LaPrairie (1911–1986), U.S. hockey player

== Other ==
- La Prairie (cosmetics), a brand of cosmetics manufactured by Beiersdorf

== See also ==
- Prairie (disambiguation)
- Laprairie (disambiguation)
