= Laprairie =

Laprairie or LaPrairie may refer to:

== Places ==
- Fort Laprairie, a French colonial fort from New France, the site now located in the city of the same name

=== Toponymy ===
Laprairie may refer to former spellings of "La Prairie" in the context of Quebec geographical names, including:

- La Prairie (provincial electoral district), a provincial electoral district in Quebec that was named "Laprairie" until 1988.
- La Prairie (federal electoral district), a former federal electoral district in Quebec abolished in 1997, which was named "Laprairie" until 1980.
- Châteauguay-Laprairie, a former provincial electoral district in Quebec
- Napierville-Laprairie, a former provincial electoral district in Quebec
- Beauharnois—Laprairie, a former federal electoral district in Quebec
- Châteauguay—Huntingdon—Laprairie, a former federal electoral district in Quebec
- Laprairie—Napierville, a former federal electoral district in Quebec
- Sainte-Catherine-d'Alexandrie-de-Laprairie, a former name of the city of Sainte-Catherine, Quebec prior to 1973
- Saint-Isidore-Laprairie, a former name of the Saint-Isidore-de-La Prairie post office in Canada
- Saint-Mathieu-de-Laprairie, a former name of the Saint-Mathieu-de-La Prairie post office in Canada

== People ==
- Bun LaPrairie (1911–1986), U.S. hockey player

== See also ==
- La Prairie, Quebec, Canada; a city
- La Prairie (disambiguation)
- Prairie (disambiguation)
