= Nissan Lafesta =

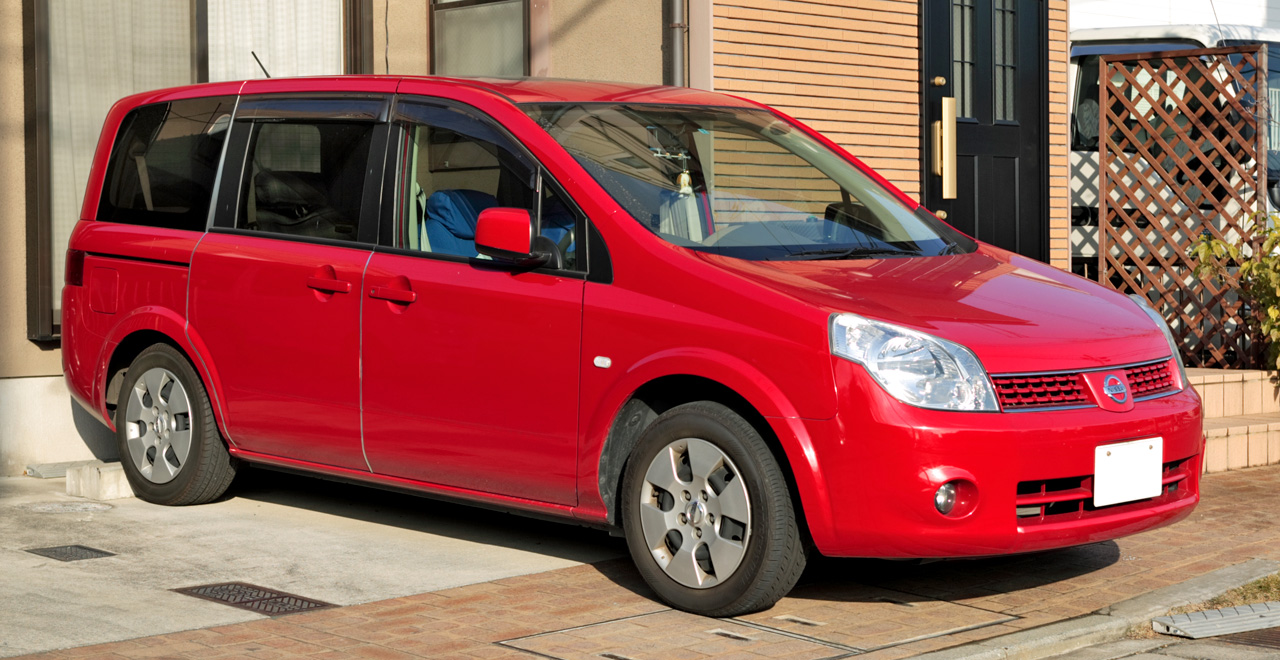

Overview
- Manufacturer: Nissan
- Production: September 2004 – December 2017

Body and chassis
- Class: Compact MPV
- Body style: 5-door minivan
- Layout: Front-engine, front-wheel-drive; Front-engine, all-wheel-drive

Chronology
- Predecessor: Nissan Prairie
- Successor: Nissan Serena (C27); Nissan NV200

The Nissan Lafesta (Japanese: 日産・ラフェスタ, Hepburn: Nissan Rafesuta) is a compact MPV built by Nissan mainly for the Japanese market.

== Etymology ==
The name was derived from the Italian word "festa", meaning holiday, festival or party, and according to the manufacturer "expresses a desire to spend an enjoyable time in the car together with family members or friends."

== First generation (B30; 2004) ==
First generation (B30/NB30)
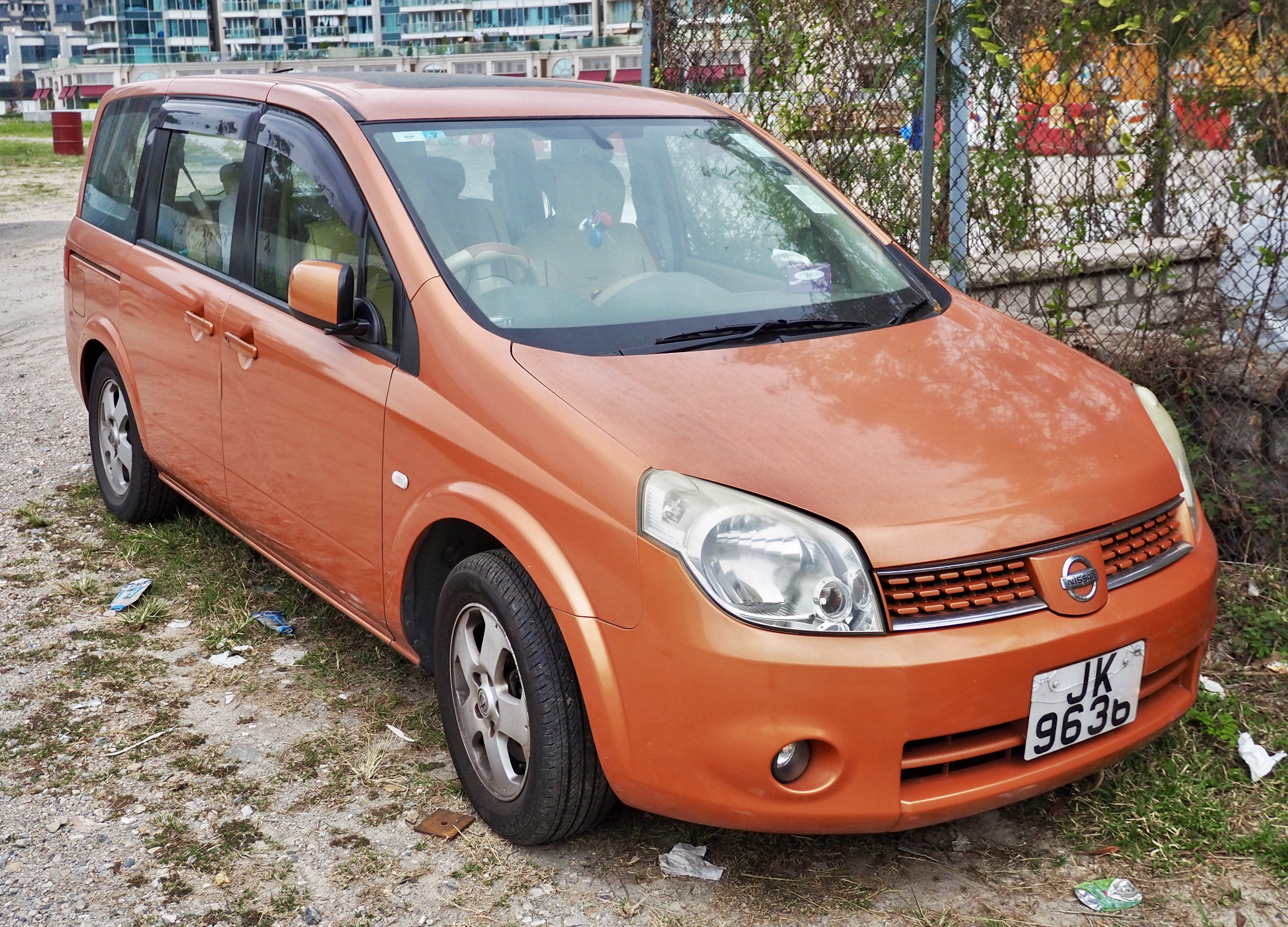
- Nissan Lafesta (pre-facelift)

Overview
- Production: September 2004–November 2012
- Assembly: Japan: Kanda, Fukuoka
- Designer: Tetsuo Oosawa

Body and chassis
- Platform: Nissan C platform
- Related: Renault Megane; Nissan X-Trail; Nissan Teana; Nissan Presage

Powertrain
- Engine: 2.0 L MR20DE I4
- Transmission: CVT

Dimensions
- Wheelbase: 2,700 mm (110 in)
- Length: 4,575 mm (180.1 in)
- Width: 1,695 mm (66.7 in)
- Height: 1,670 mm (66 in)
- Curb weight: 1,520 kg (3,350 lb)

It was unveiled on September 2, 2004, and first released on December 2, 2004, with a sales target of 5,000/month. The Lafesta shares a platform with the Renault Scénic and Renault Megane.

The Lafesta was the successor to the Nissan Prairie/Liberty and competed with the Toyota Isis, Honda Stream, Toyota WISH, Subaru Exiga, and the Mazda Premacy. The Lafesta also replaced the Nissan Avenir.

The vehicle offers sliding doors on both sides (one of which is power-assisted), Nissan's Intelligent key system, GPS navigation system, reverse camera and a very large sunroof. The only engine option available is a 2.0 L MR20DE inline-four unit. Both front- and four-wheel drive transmissions are available; the former uses a torsion beam suspension at the rear while the latter has a trailing arm multi-link arrangement.

The Lafesta is built at the same factory that once produced the larger Nissan Presage.

In 2007, the Lafesta received a minor facelift.

The first generation Lafesta was discontinued in Japan on December 26, 2012, after being sold alongside the second generation, with it being rebranded as the Lafesta Joy.

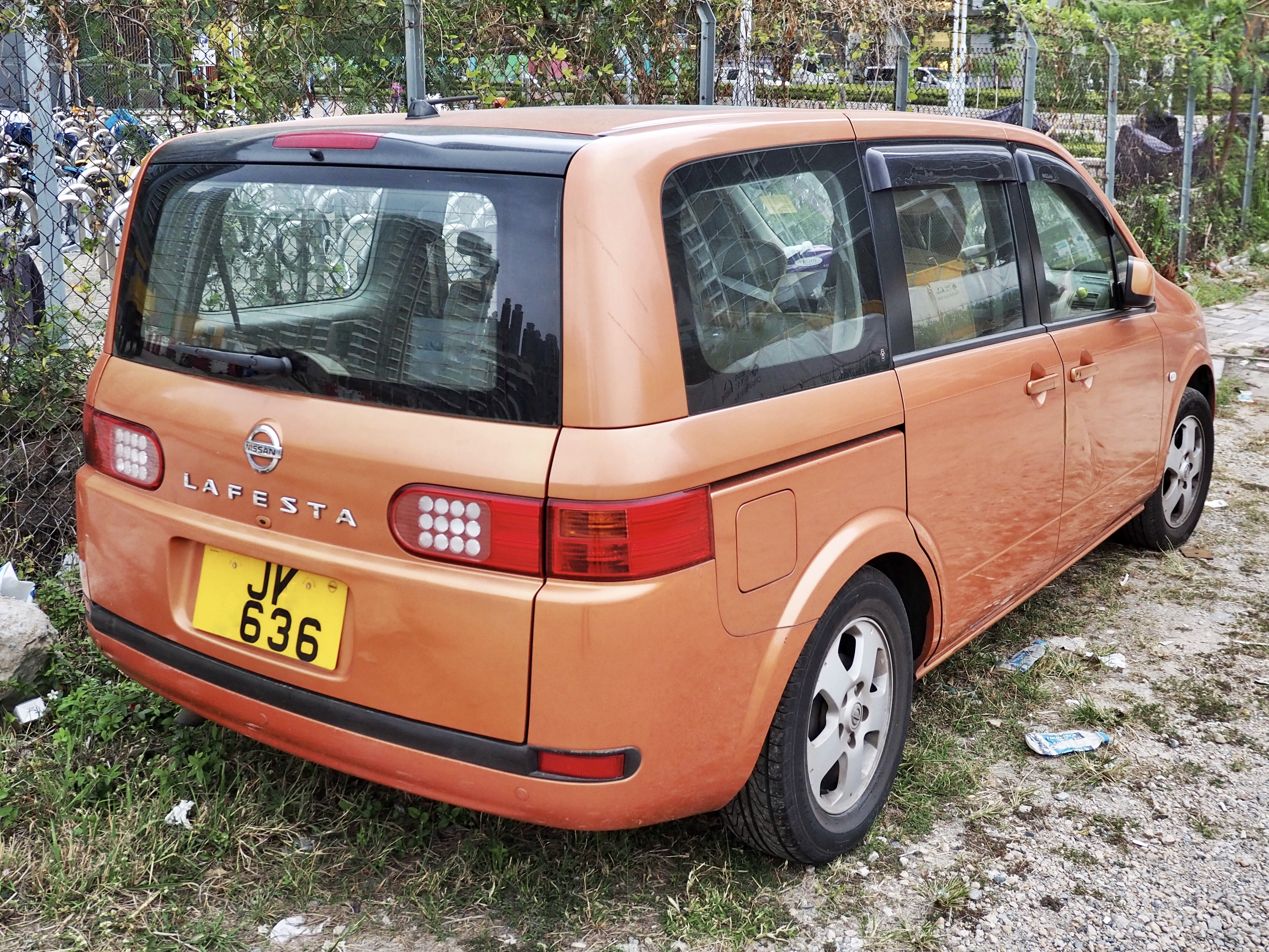
Nissan Lafesta (pre-facelift)

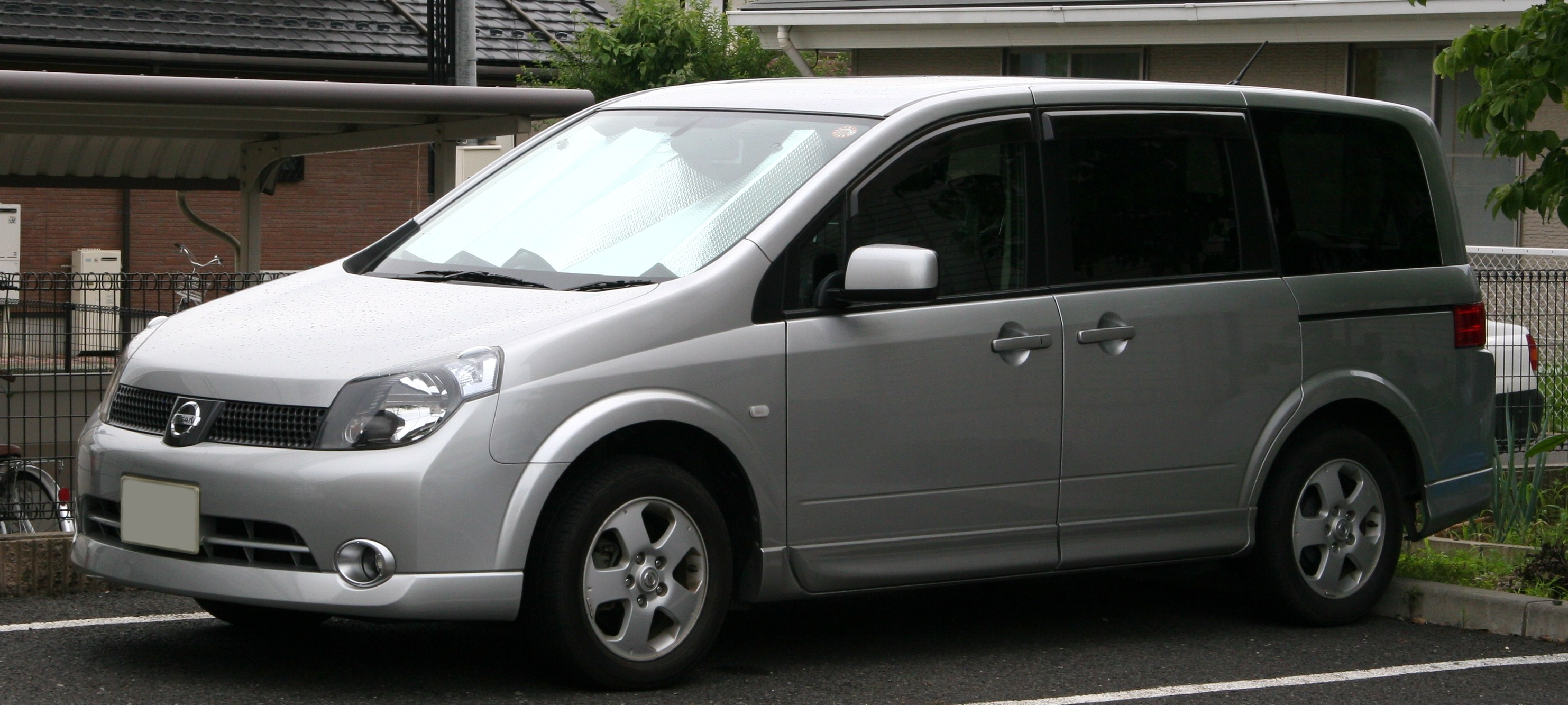
Nissan Lafesta Highway Star (pre-facelift)

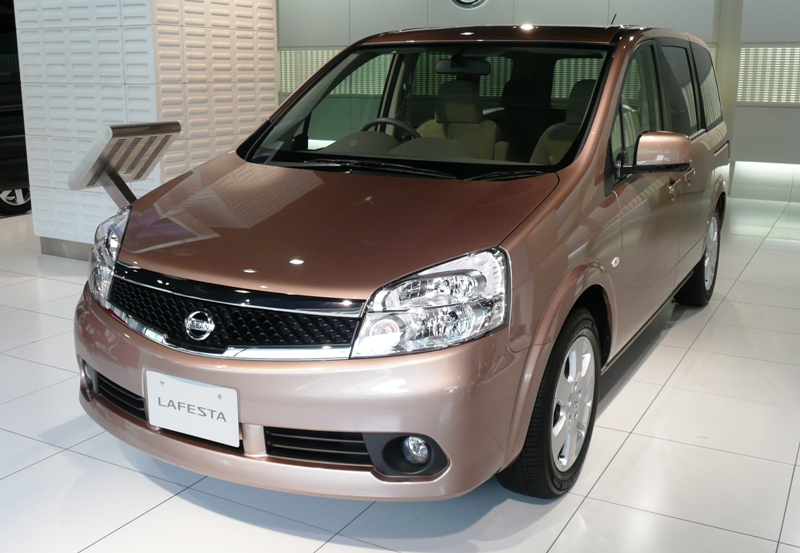
Nissan Lafesta (facelift)

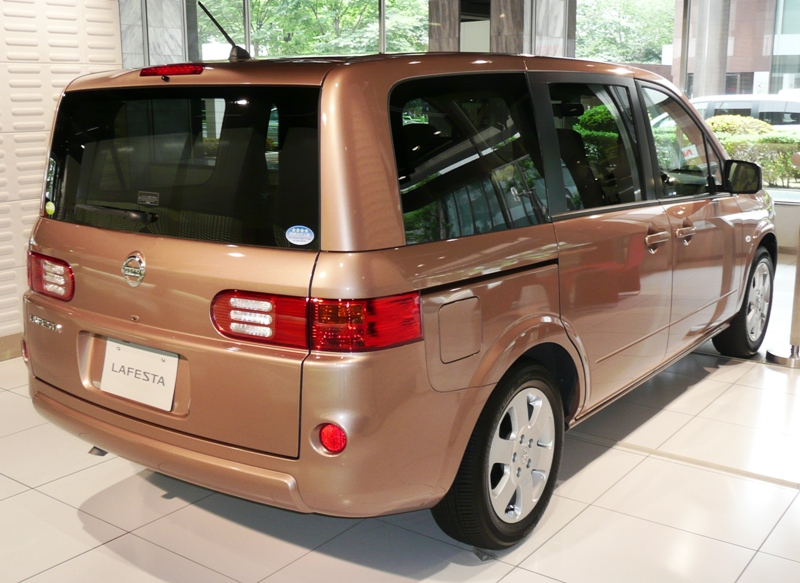
Nissan Lafesta (facelift)

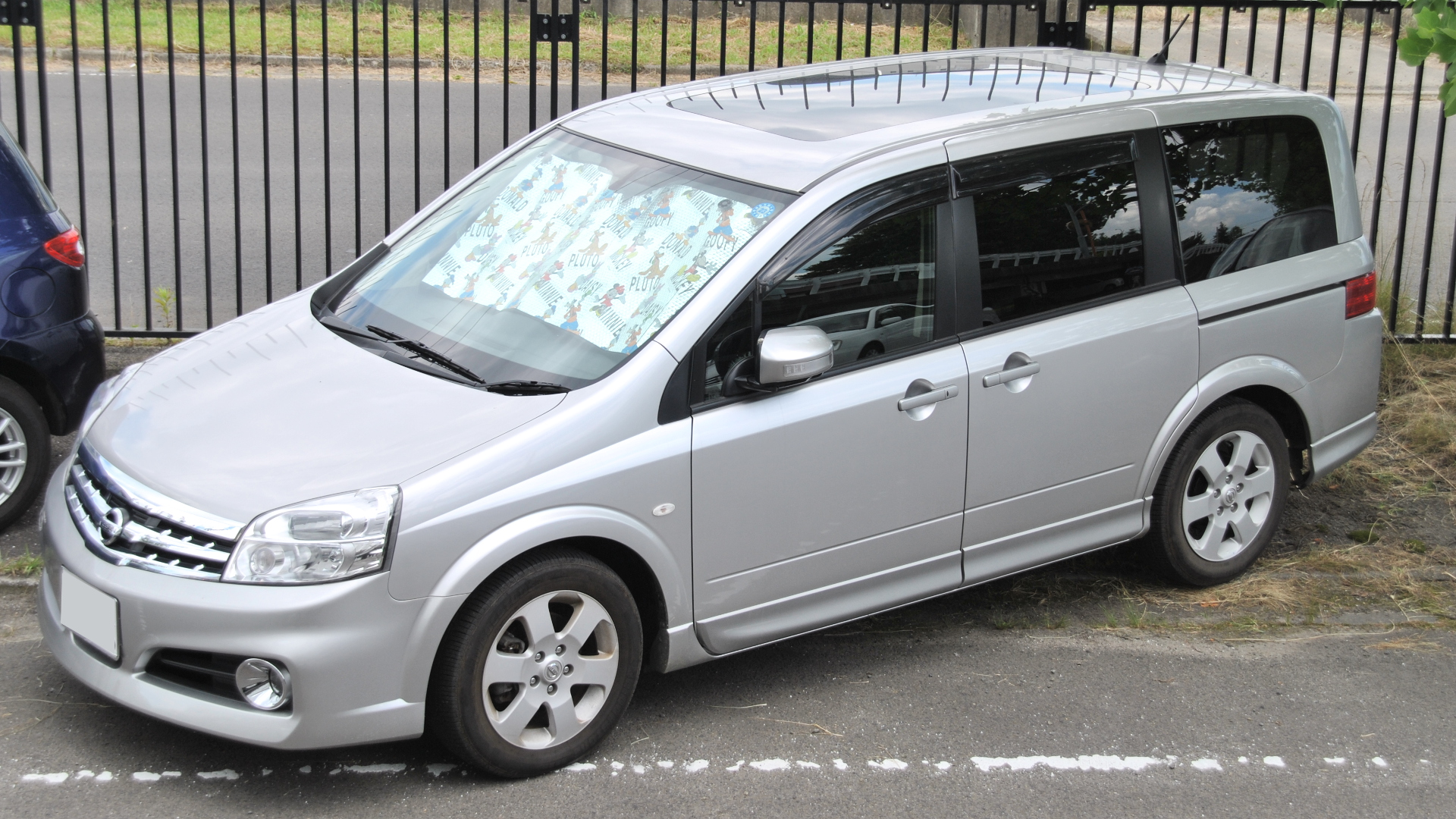
Nissan Lafesta Highway Star (facelift)

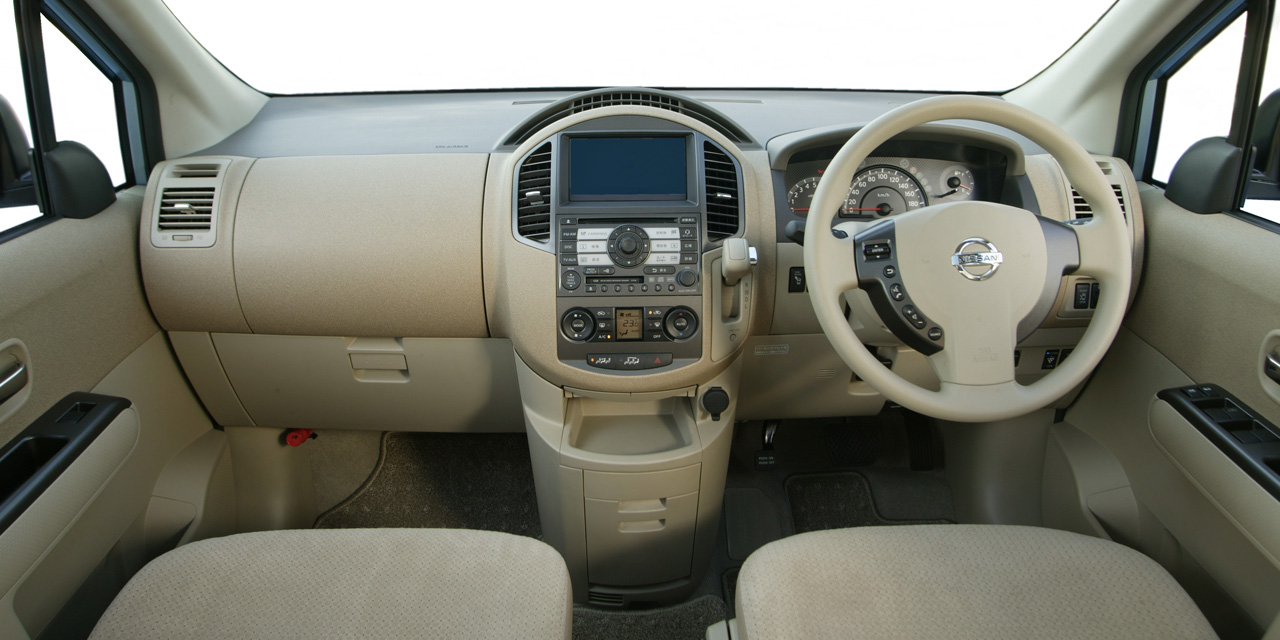
Interior

== Second generation (B35; 2011) ==
Second generation (CWEFWN/CWEAWN)
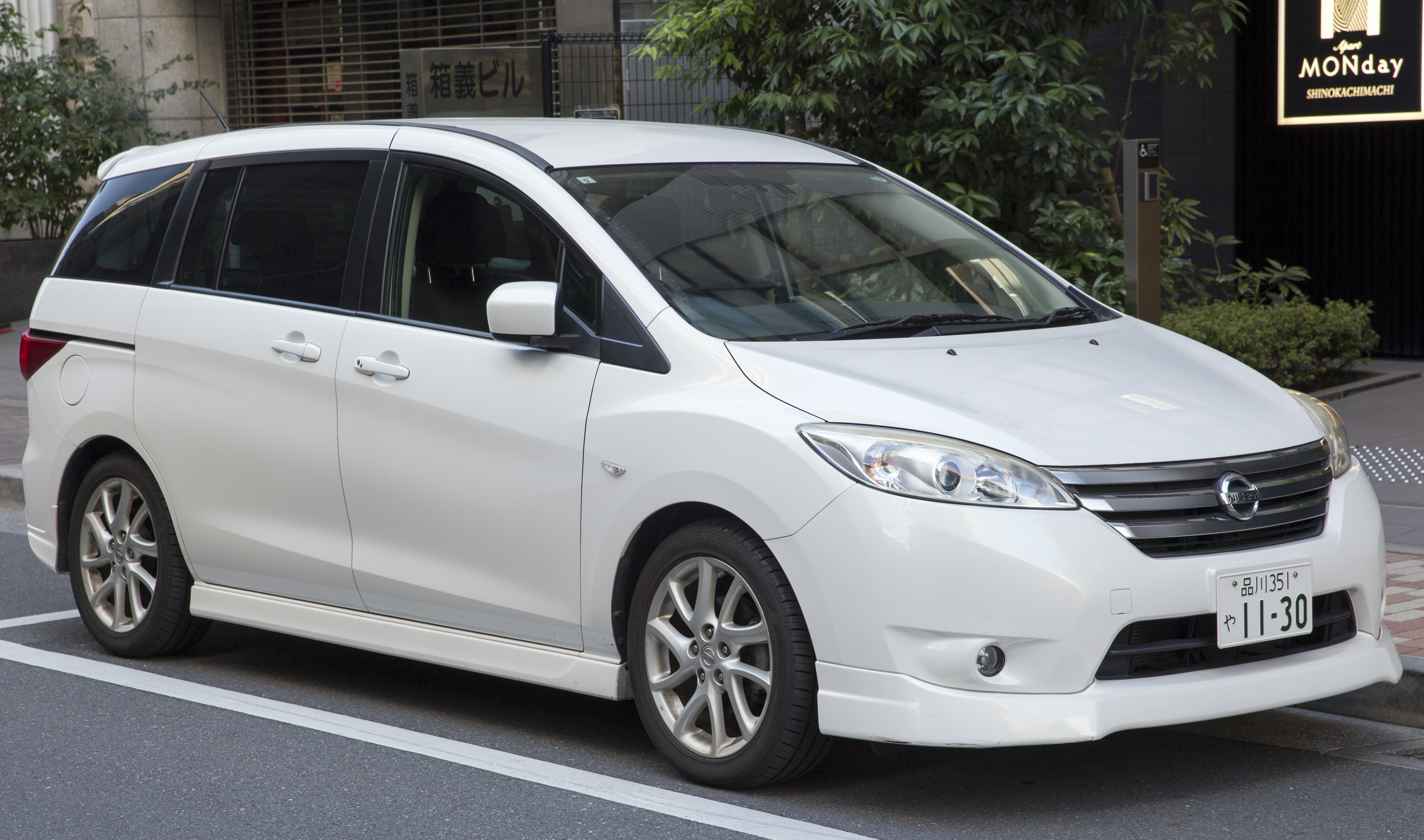
- 2012 Nissan Lafesta Highway Star G

Overview
- Also called: Mazda Premacy
- Production: May 2011 – March 2018
- Assembly: Japan: Hiroshima (Mazda Hiroshima Plant)

Body and chassis
- Platform: Mazda CW platform

Powertrain
- Engine: 2.0 L MZR LF-VD I4; 2.0 L MZR LF-VDS I4; 2.0 L MZR LF-VE I4 (AWD); 2.0 L SKYACTIV-G (PE-VPS) I4
- Transmission: 4-speed automatic (AWD); 5-speed automatic; 6-speed automatic

Dimensions
- Wheelbase: 2,750 mm (108 in)
- Length: 4,615 mm (181.7 in)
- Width: 1,750 mm (69 in)
- Height: 1,615 mm (63.6 in)

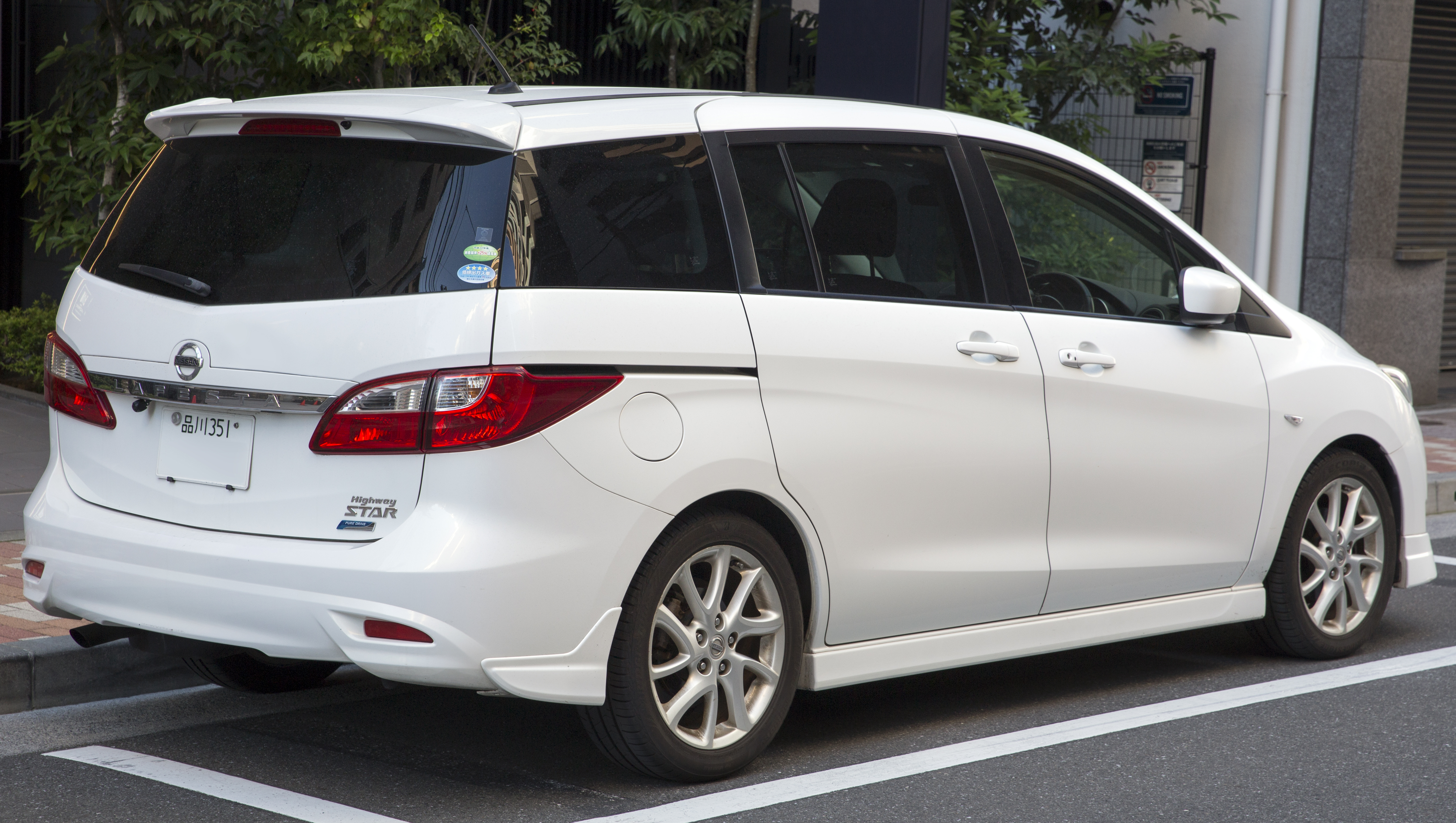
Rear view

The second generation Lafesta is a version of the third generation Mazda Premacy supplied to Nissan by Mazda on an original equipment manufacturer (OEM) basis. Mazda supplied the Premacy for use in the Nissan Lafesta Highway Star beginning in May 2011. Unlike the Premacy, the new Nissan Lafesta Highway Star ditches the Nagare design.

Japanese models went on sale on 15 June 2011. Models available include Highway Star (J, and G, with the G Supremo added in April 2012).

=== Discontinuation ===
Following the discontinuation of the Mazda Premacy, sales of the Nissan Lafesta Highway Star ended in March 2018.
