= Toyota Isis =

Toyota Isis (AM10)
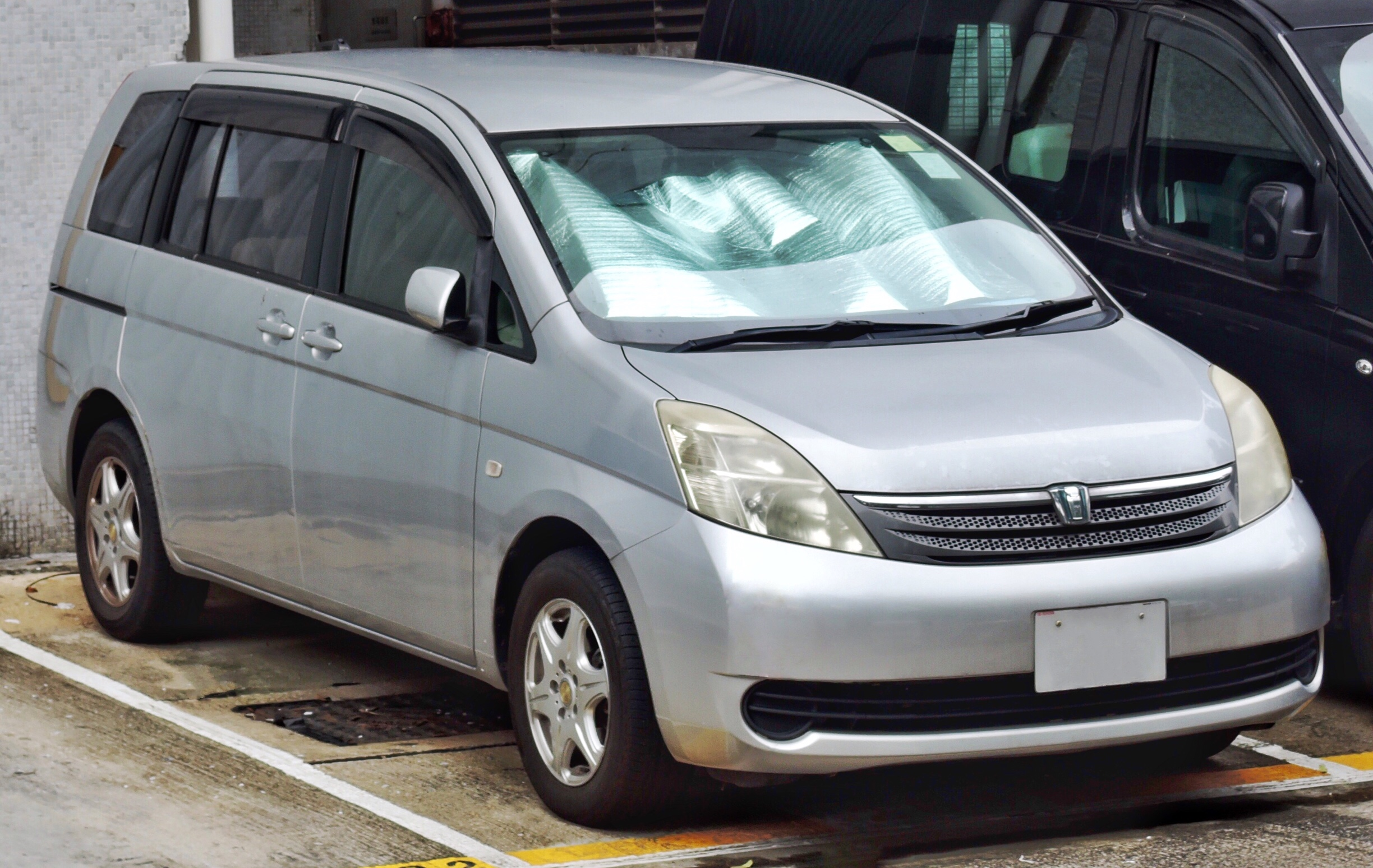
- 2004 Toyota Isis (pre-facelift)

Overview
- Manufacturer: Kanto Auto Works
- Production: 2004–2017
- Assembly: Japan: Susono, Shizuoka (Higashi Fuji plant)
- Designer: Hiroshi Okamoto

Body and chassis
- Class: Minivan
- Body style: 5-door minivan
- Layout: Front-engine, front-wheel-drive Front-engine, four-wheel-drive
- Platform: Toyota MC platform

Powertrain
- Engine: 1.8 L 1ZZ-FE I4 (gasoline 2004 - 2009); 1.8 L 2ZR-FAE I4 (gasoline 2009 - 2017); 2.0 L 1AZ-FSE I4 (gasoline 2004 - 2009); 2.0 L 3ZR-FAE I4 (gasoline 2009 - 2017)
- Transmission: 4-speed automatic (1.8L 2004 - 2009); CVT (2.0L 2004 - 2017, 1.8L 2009 - 2017)

Dimensions
- Length: 4,640 mm (182.7 in)
- Width: 1,710 mm (67.3 in)
- Height: 1,670 mm (65.7 in)
- Curb weight: 1,560 kg (3,439.2 lb)

Chronology
- Predecessor: Toyota Gaia
- Successor: Toyota Noah (R80)

The Toyota Isis is a seven-seat large MPV manufactured by Kanto Auto Works under contract for Japanese automaker Toyota. It is sold in Japan and was launched in September 2004. It features sliding doors and is available with either front- or four-wheel drive and straight-four 1.8- and 2.0-liter gasoline engines. It competed in Japan with the Honda Stream and the Nissan Lafesta.

The Isis used a unique approach to the sliding doors in that the front passenger door and the rear passenger sliding door interlock when closed, instead of having a doorjamb that the doors attach to. This door system is used only on the passenger side. The doors on the driver's side attach with a conventional doorjamb. The front passenger seat can be folded flat upon itself and then tilted forward to further provide passenger access. The doors also interlock with the top and bottom door openings so that both doors can be opened independently of each other. This door feature was first used by Toyota on the Toyota Raum. This type of door was first used on the Nissan Prairie in 1981, and was also used on the Ford B-Max.

In 2007, a telematic G-BOOK, a subscription telematics service was offered as an option.

According to Toyota, the Isis naming mean to Isis a major goddess in ancient Egyptian religion. When the terrorist group ISIS emerged in 2014, Toyota was criticized for inadvertently supplying the militant group with trucks, and was urged to change the name of the MPV, which had become unfortunate by then. The Isis was discontinued in Japan on 11 December 2017.

== Gallery ==
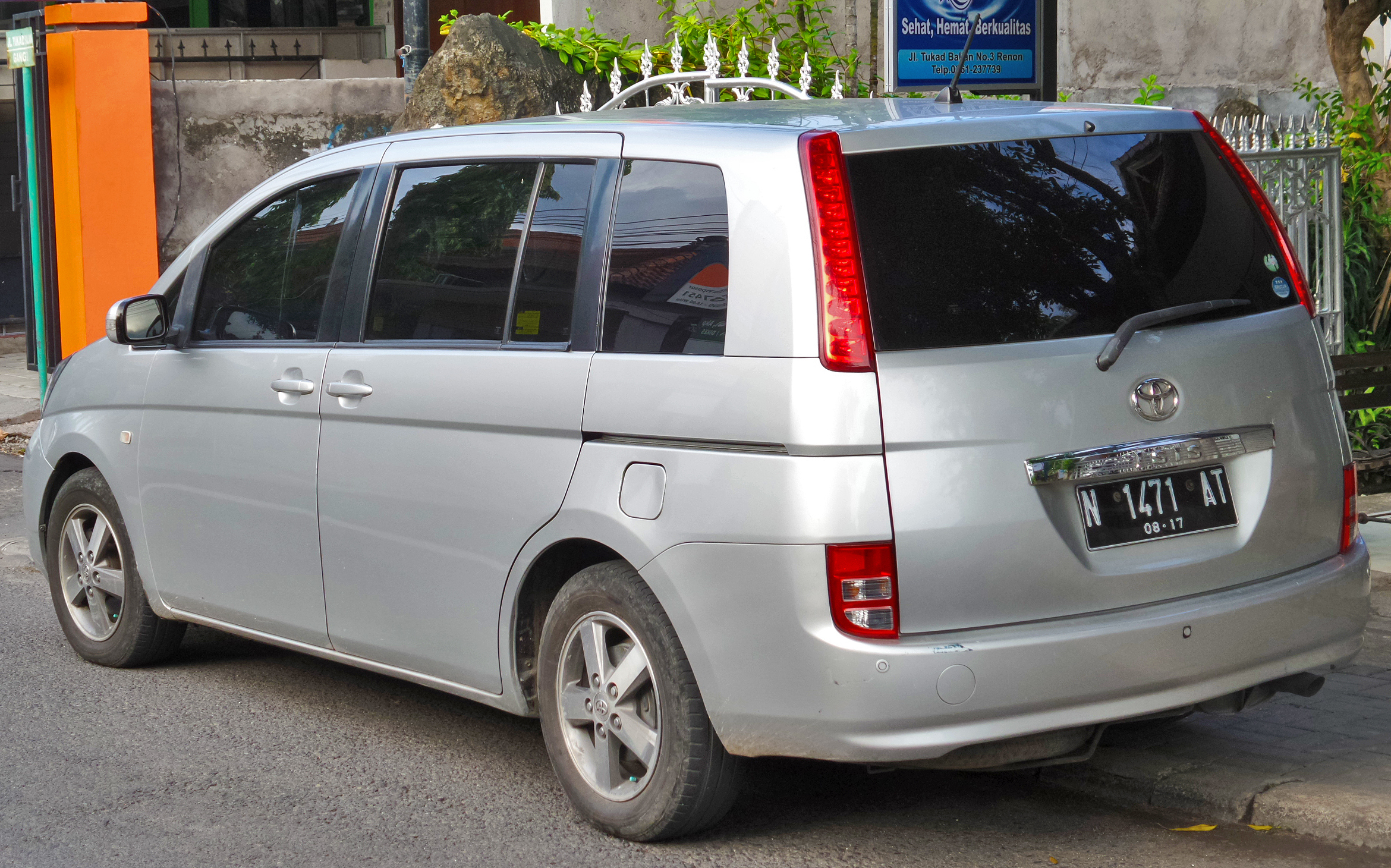
Rear view (pre-facelift)

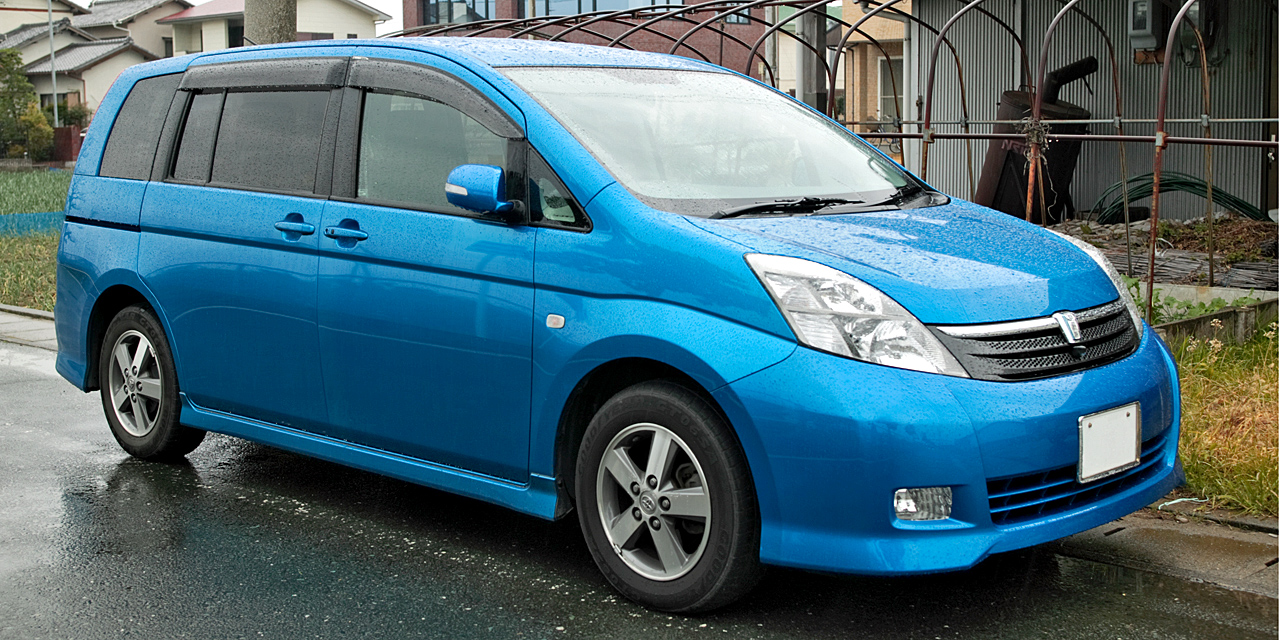
Isis Platana (pre-facelift)

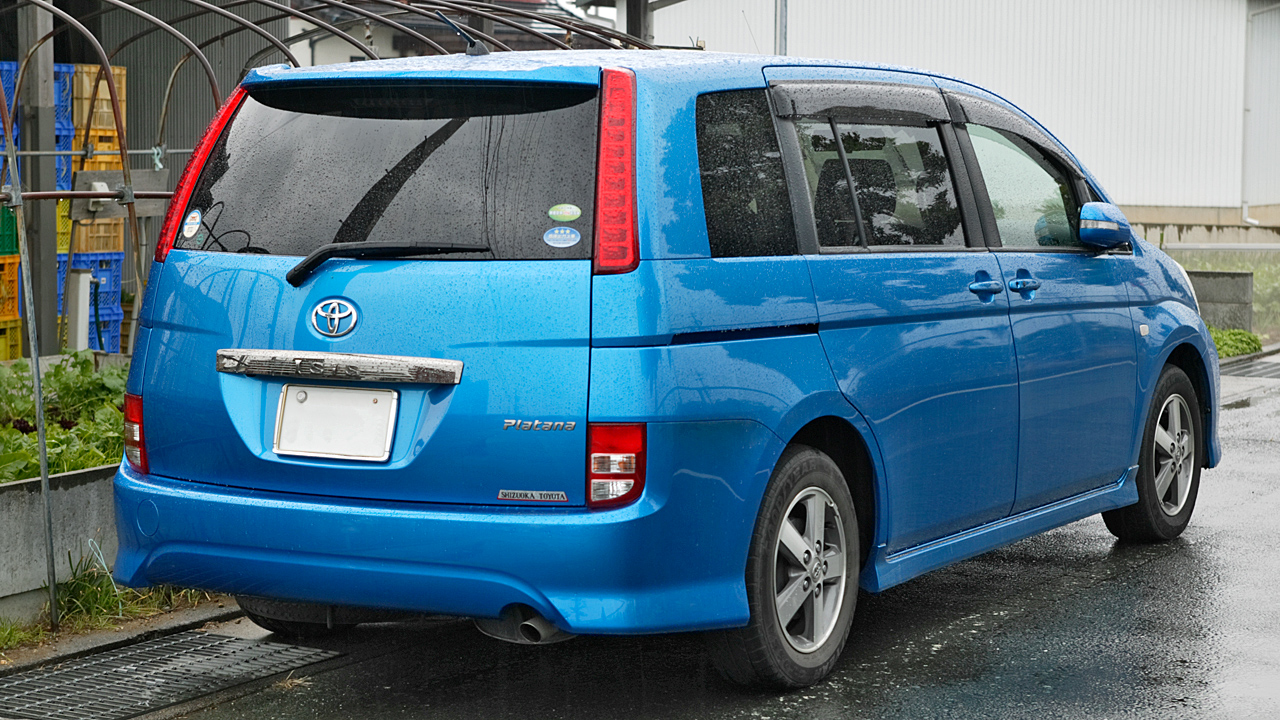
Isis Platana (pre-facelift)

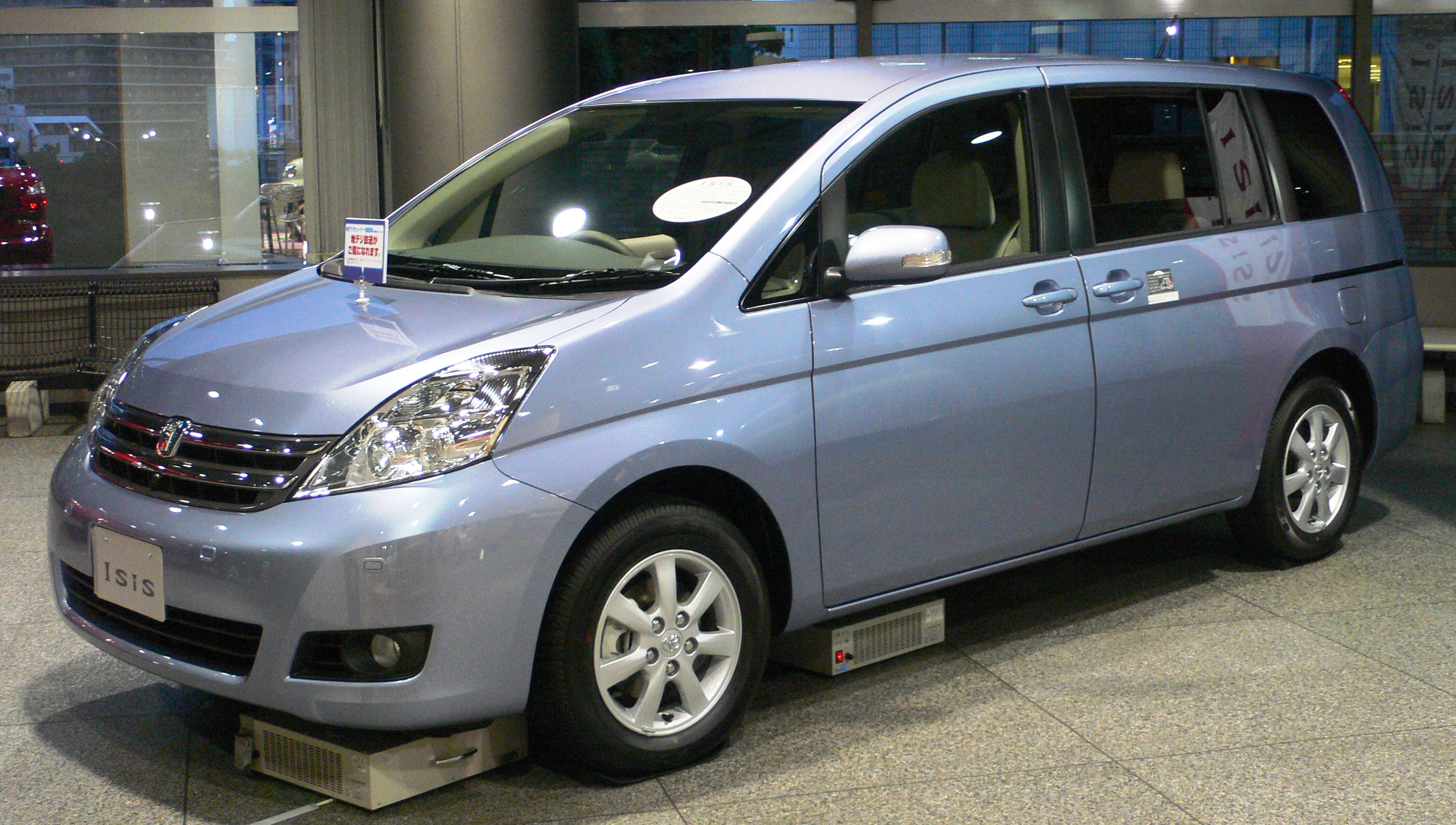
2007 Isis (first facelift)

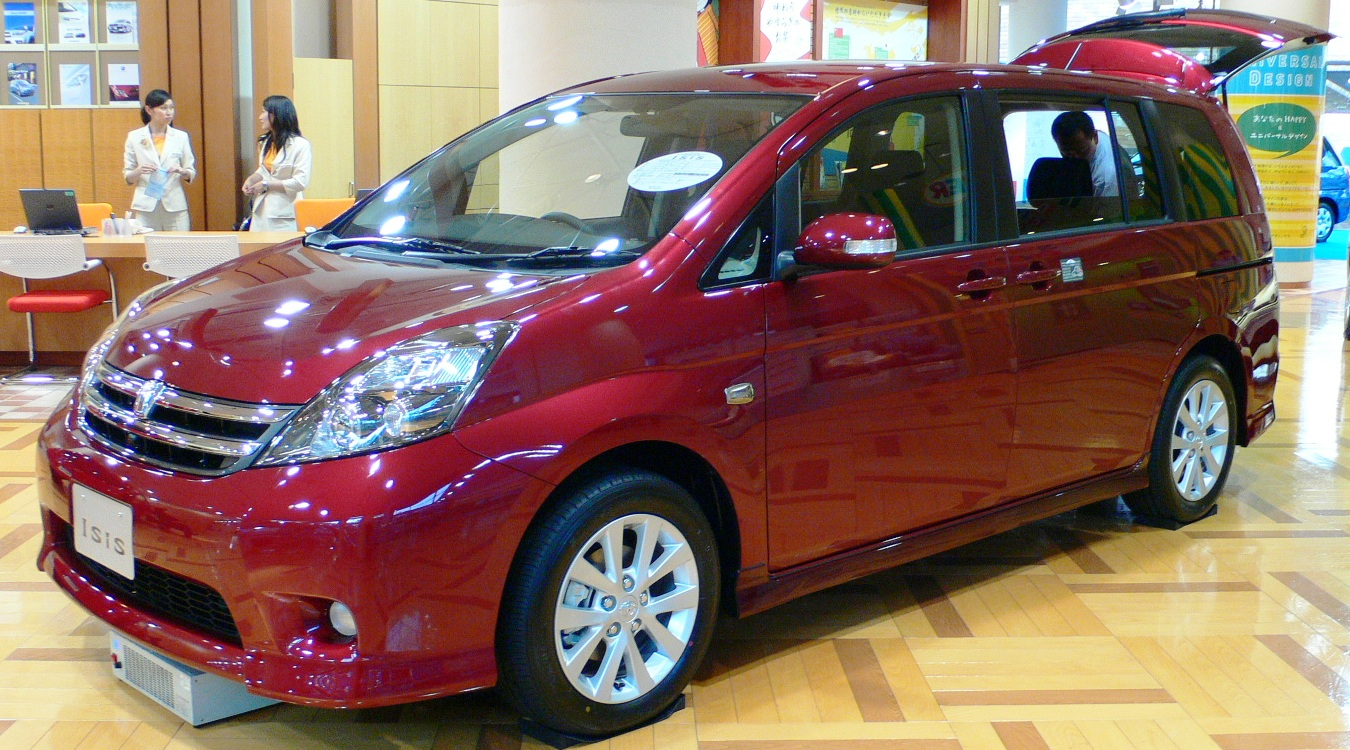
2007 Isis Platana (first facelift)

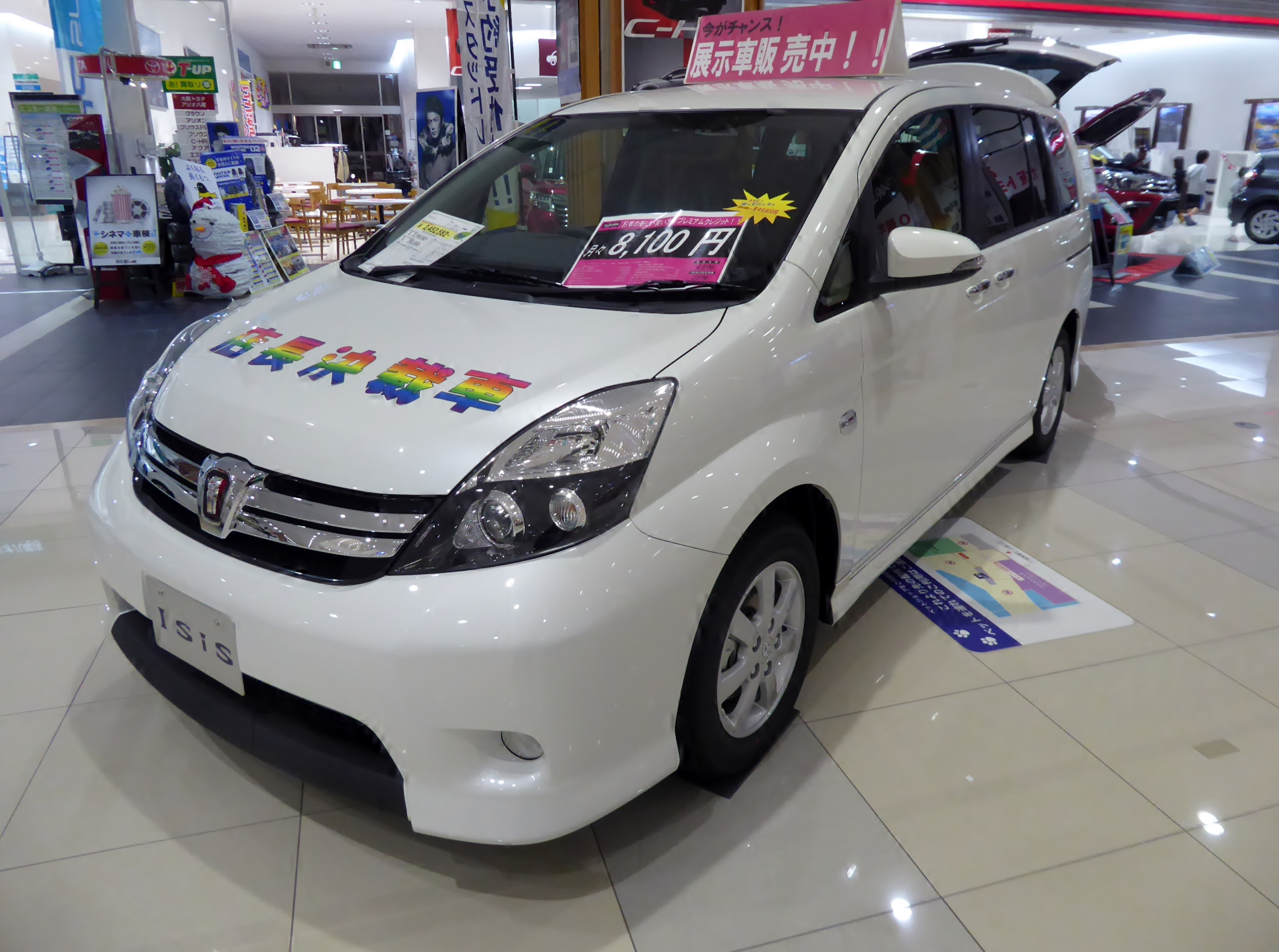
Isis Platana V-Selection Blanc (second facelift)

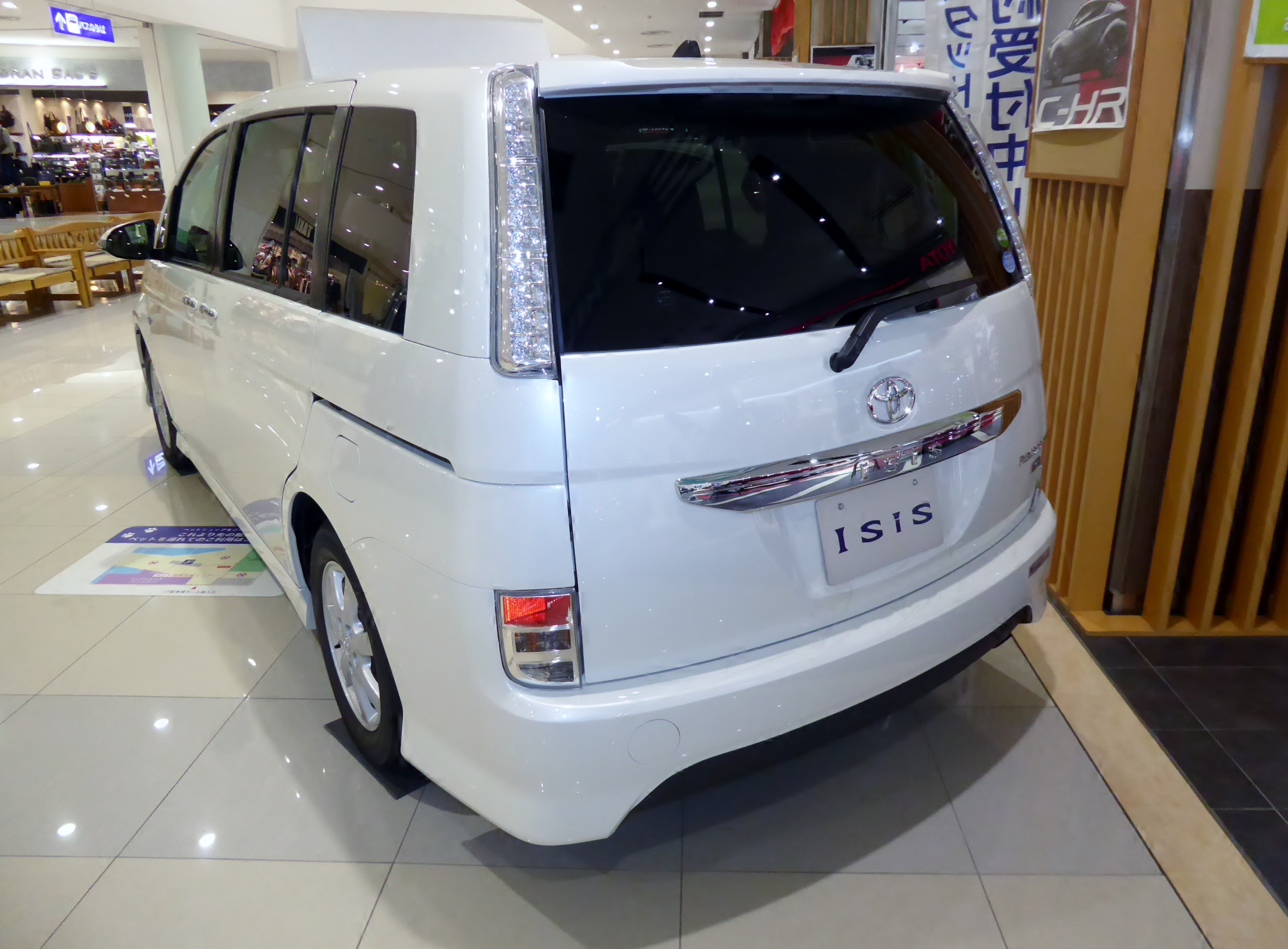
Isis Platana V-Selection Blanc (second facelift)

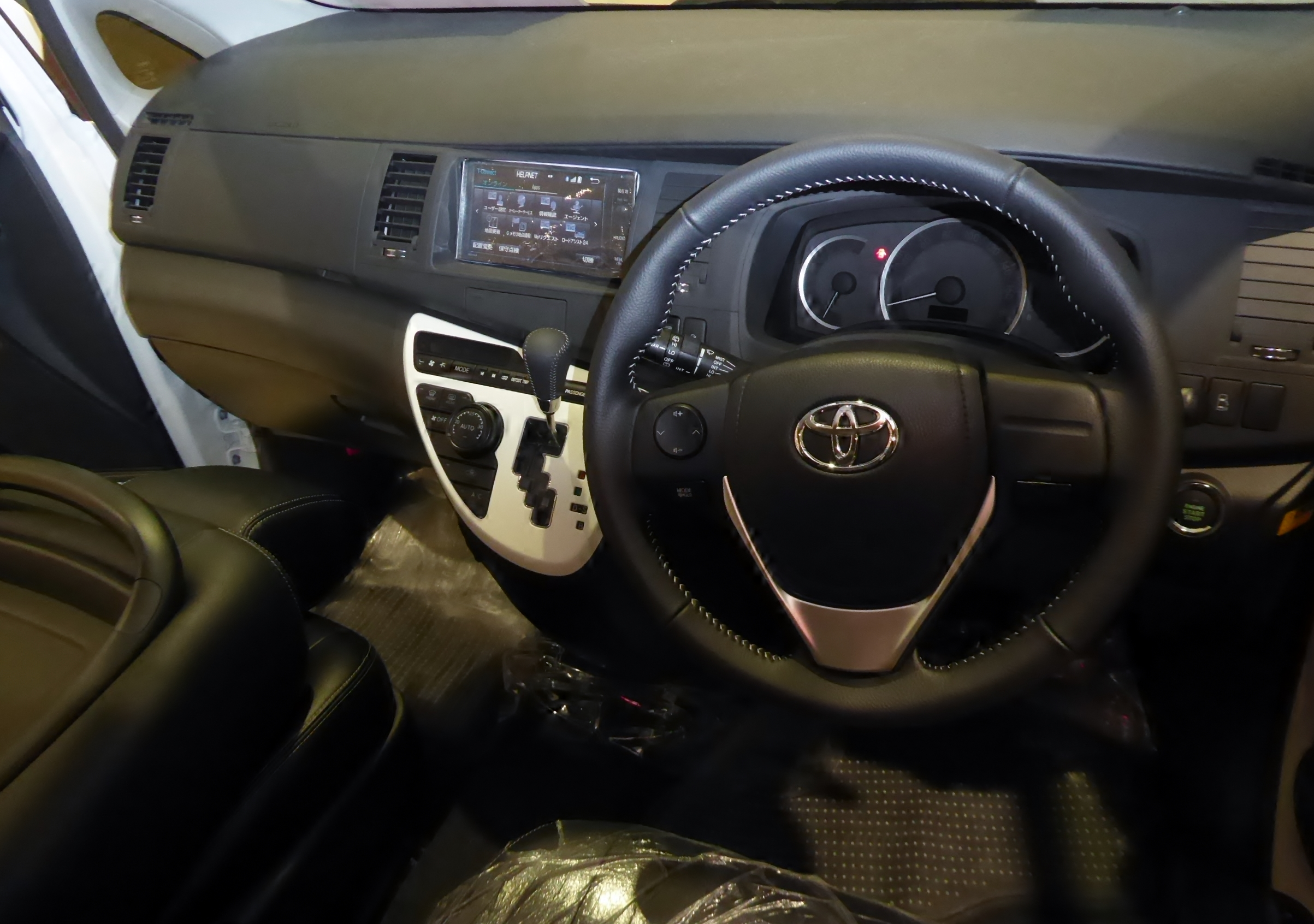
Interior (second facelift)

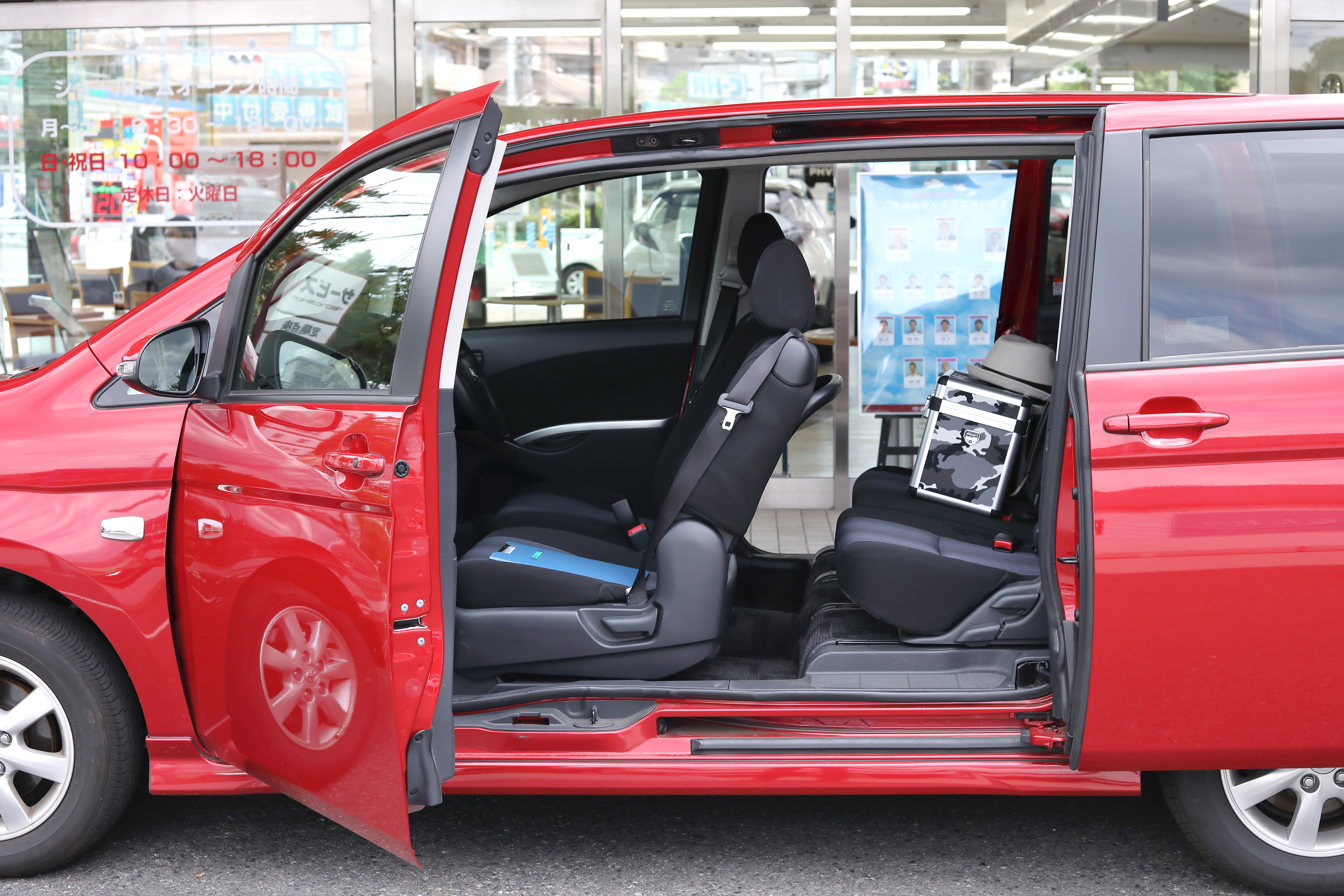
Isis with doors open

== Trim levels (Japan) ==
2000 cc

- Platana (2WD, 4WD)
- G U-Selection (2WD, 4WD)
- G (2WD, 4WD)
- L (2WD, 4WD)
- L X-Selection (2WD, 4WD)
- Navi Special
- Navi Selection Blanc
- Navi Selection Noir

1800 cc

- Platana (2WD)
- L (2WD)
- L X-Selection (2WD)
- Navi Special
- Navi Selection Blanc
- Navi Selection Noir

== See also ==
- List of Toyota vehicles
