= American prairie =

American prairie may refer to either:

- Prairie, an ecosystem spanning a large region of North America
- American Prairie, a particular nature reserve in Central Montana, United States
  - American Prairie Foundation, a non-profit for the nature reserve

== See also ==
- The Great Plains
- Prairie (disambiguation)
