= Prairie River =

Prairie River may refer to:

== Rivers in the United States ==
- Prairie River, in Louisiana, a tributary of Bayou Pierre
- Prairie River (Michigan), a tributary of the St. Joseph River
- Prairie River (Big Sandy Lake), in Minnesota
- Prairie River (Mississippi River tributary), in Minnesota
- Prairie River (Wisconsin), a tributary of the Wisconsin River

== Other uses ==
- Prairie River, Saskatchewan, Canada, a hamlet
  - Prairie River station, now Prairie River Museum
- Prairie River, an Intel ASIC for the Omni-Path architecture

== See also ==
- Long Prairie River, a tributary of the Crow Wing River in Minnesota, US
- Prairie Rivers Network, an American nonprofit organization
- Rivière des Prairies, a delta channel of the Ottawa River in Quebec, Canada
