= Nissan Prairie =

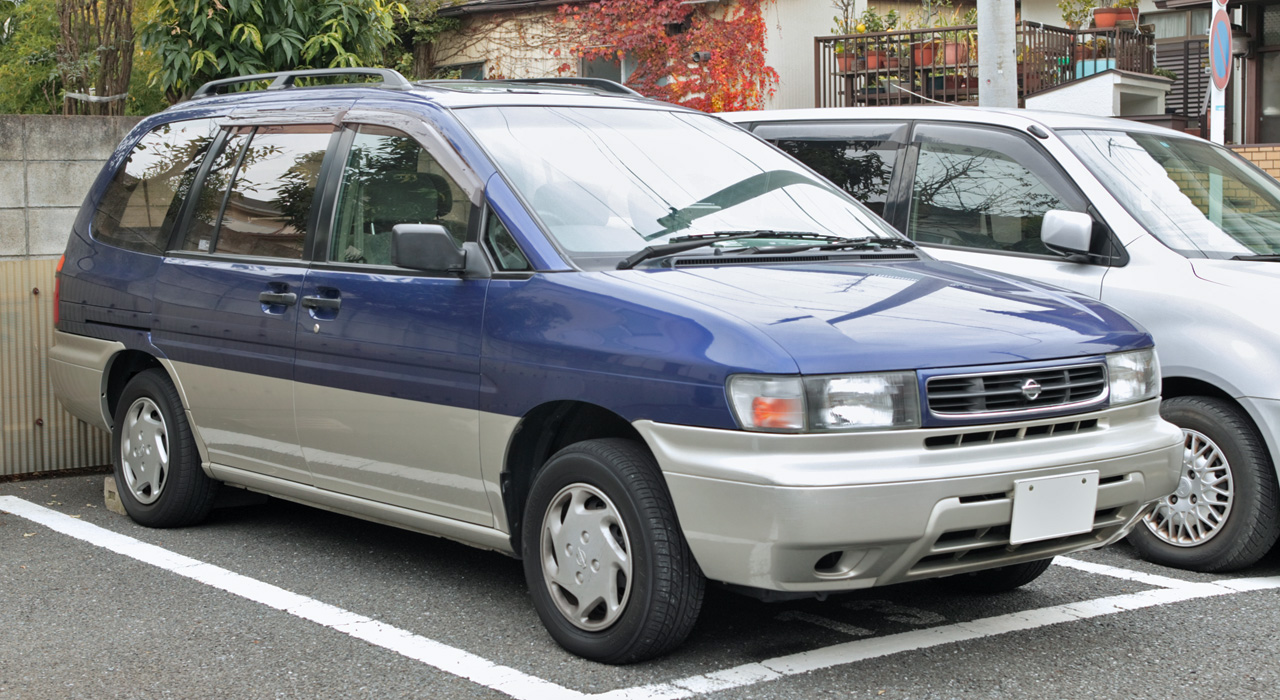

Overview
- Manufacturer: Nissan
- Also called: Nissan Multi; Nissan Stanza Wagon; Nissan Liberty; Nissan Axxess
- Production: 1982–2004

Body and chassis
- Class: Compact MPV
- Body style: 5-door minivan
- Layout: Front-engine, front-wheel-drive or all-wheel-drive

Chronology
- Successor: Nissan Lafesta; Nissan Serena

The Nissan Prairie (Japanese: 日産・プレーリー, Hepburn: Nissan Purērī) is an automobile manufactured and marketed by Nissan from 1981 to 2004. It is considered a mini MPV or a compact MPV. It was also marketed as the Multi in Canada and the Stanza Wagon in the United States. In Japan, it was exclusive to Nissan Store locations, then later at Nissan Blue Stage sales channels. The Prairie had flexible seating and sliding rear doors on both sides, with a liftgate in the back. The name "prairie" comes from French and means an extensive area of relatively flat grassland, similar to "steppe" or "savanna".

The second generation was marketed as the Nissan Axxess in North America, and replaced there by the larger Nissan/Ford joint venture called the Nissan Quest, and in Europe it was partially replaced by the Nissan Serena.

When the third generation of this vehicle was introduced in Japan, it was renamed initially Prairie Liberty, with the "Prairie" name eventually dropped in November 1998. This vehicle was replaced with the Nissan Lafesta in 2004.

== First generation (M10; 1982) ==
First generation (M10)
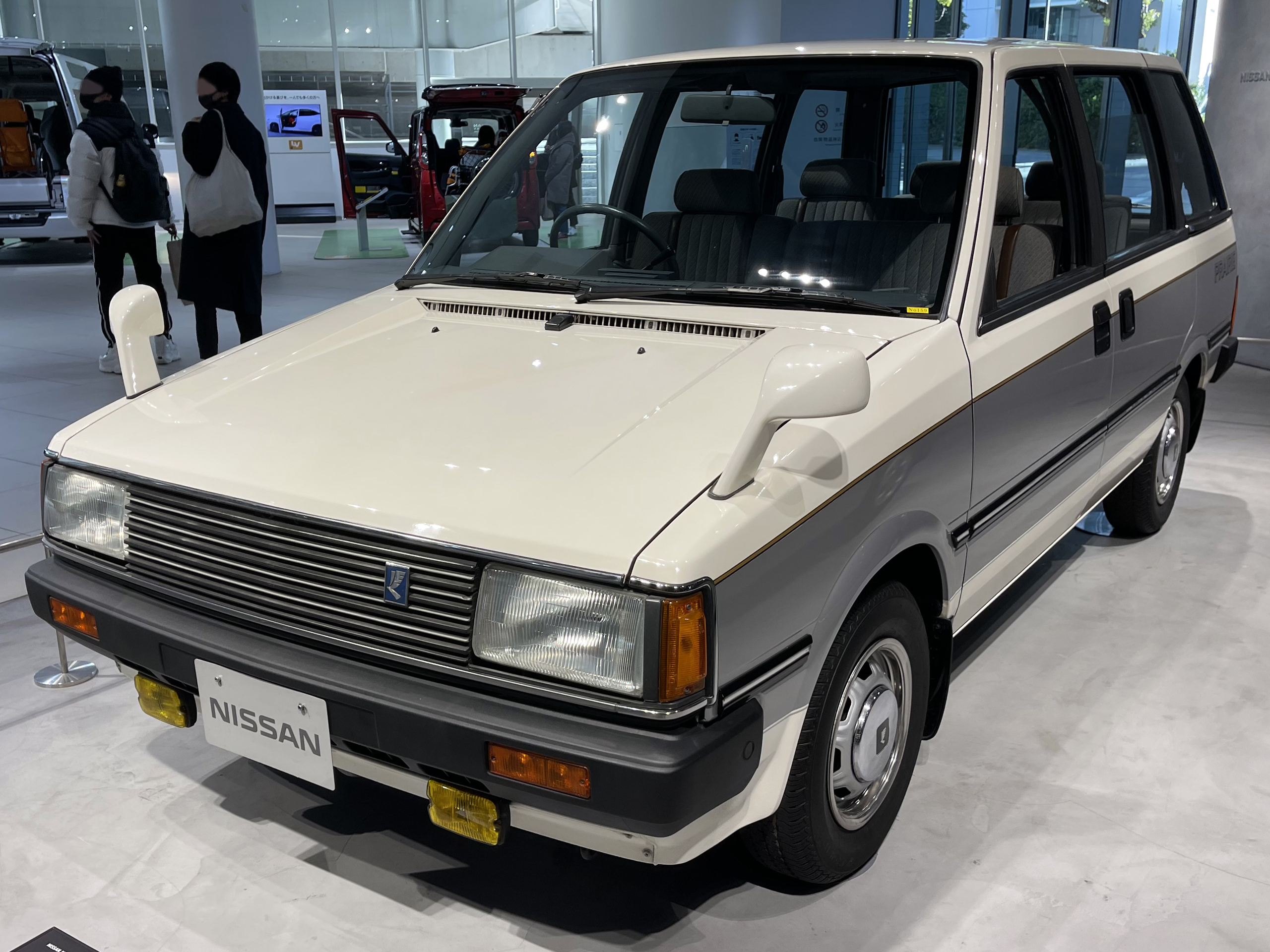
- 1984 Nissan PRAIRIE JW-G

Overview
- Also called: Nissan Multi (Canada); Nissan Stanza Wagon (US)
- Production: 1982–1988
- Assembly: Nissan Shatai Shonan, Hiratsuka, Kanagawa, Japan
- Designer: Naganori Ito

Body and chassis
- Related: Nissan Pulsar; Nissan Sunny; Nissan Vanette

Powertrain
- Engine: Petrol: 1.5 L E15S I4 (BM10); 1.6 L E16 I4; 1.8 L CA18S I4 (PM10); 2.0 L CA20S/CA20E I4 (HM10)
- Transmission: 5-speed manual 3/4-speed automatic

Dimensions
- Wheelbase: 2WD: 2,515 mm (99.0 in); 4WD: 2,525 mm (99.4 in)
- Length: 2WD: 4,326 mm (170.3 in); 4WD: 4,229 mm (166.5 in)
- Width: 1,666 mm (65.6 in)
- Height: 2WD: 1,575 mm (62.0 in); 4WD: 1,615 mm (63.6 in)
- Curb weight: 1,020 kg (2,249 lb)

The Nissan Prairie, known in Canada as the Multi and the United States as the Stanza Wagon, was equipped with a four-cylinder engine, with either a manual or automatic transmission. Available with front wheel drive or optional four wheel drive, the vehicle had rear passenger sliding doors on both sides of the vehicle, and a folding rear seat, designed to increase the carrying capacity of the passenger compartment. The rear tailgate opened upwards as one complete unit, in a similar fashion to a hatchback or station wagon. The Prairie competed with the Toyota Sprinter Carib with a similar wagon approach, Mitsubishi Chariot, and the Honda Shuttle.

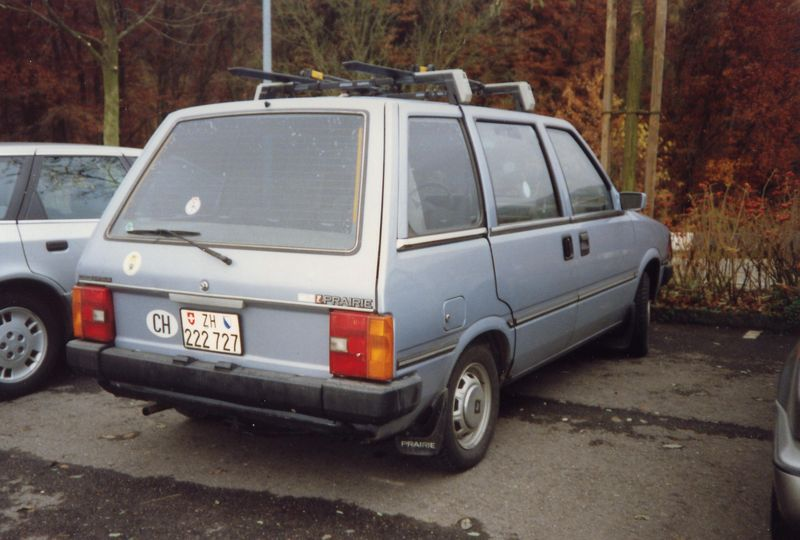
Early Prairie 1500, showing original rear design

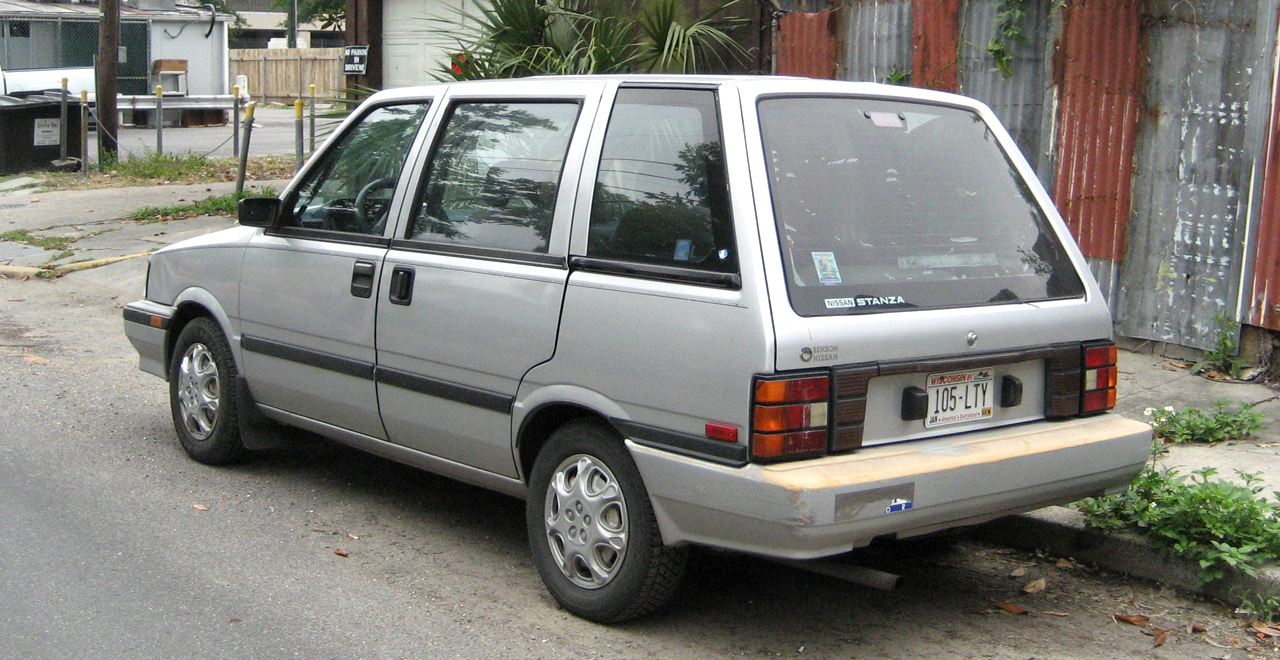
Nissan Stanza wagon (USA-spec)

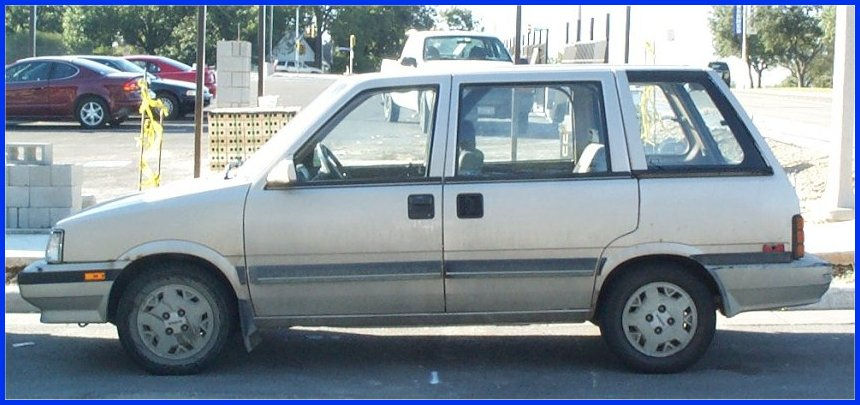
1987 Nissan Multi (Canada-spec)

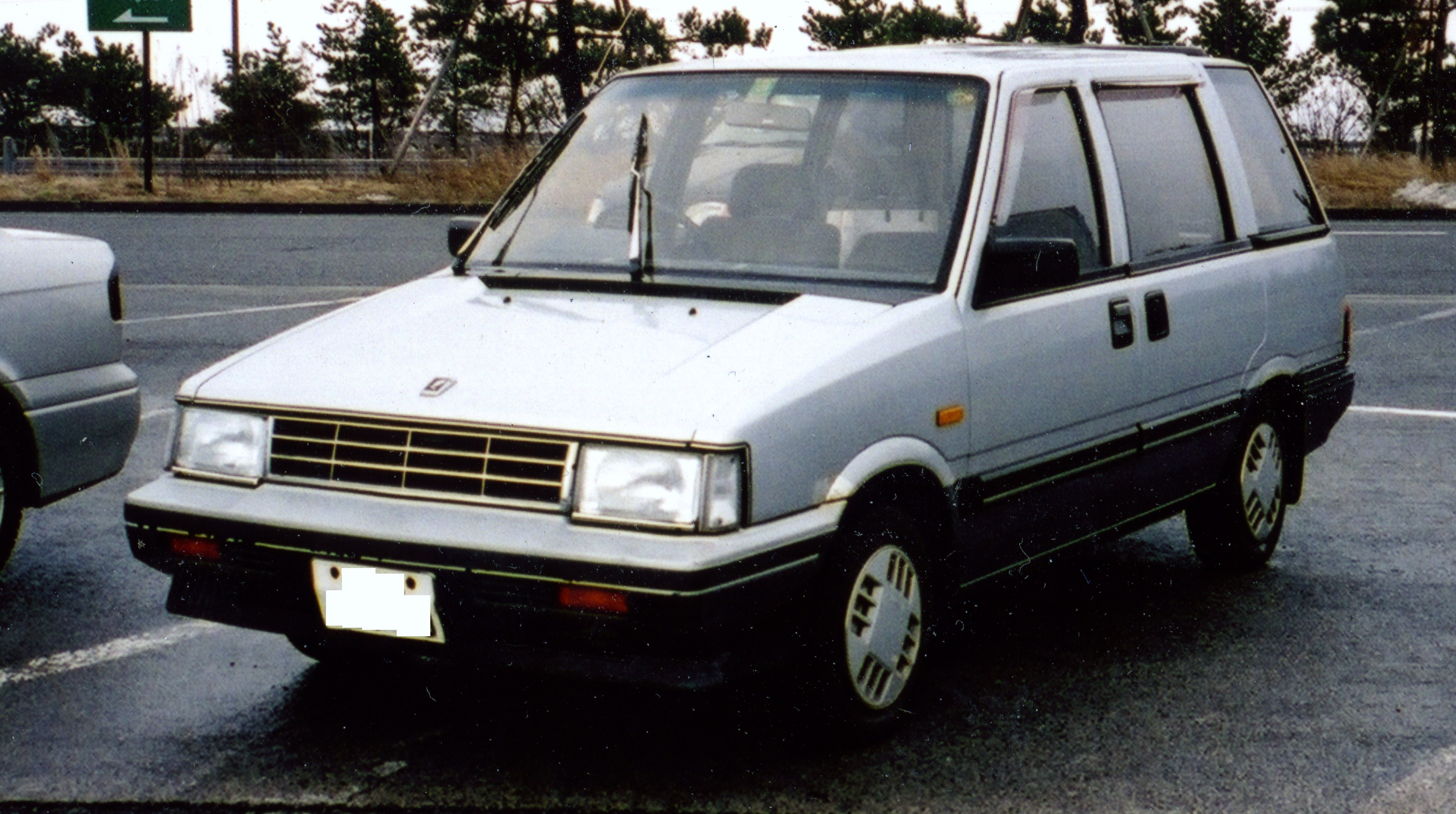
Facelift model (JDM)

The Prairie resembled a tall station wagon / estate with the addition of sliding side doors. It was available with five seats, though seven and eight were also available in some markets. It was developed from the Nissan Sunny platform, while using the powertrain from the Nissan Stanza. It was a companion model to the more traditional cabover Nissan Vanette, offering buyers a choice of appearance and flexibility. The trailing arm torsion beam rear suspension was borrowed from the Pulsar Van (VN10; sold as the Cherry Wagon in Europe). Some reviewers commented that when driven hard, undesirable body characteristics were exhibited, possibly due to the combination of missing B-pillar and torsion beam rear suspension. Strong understeering characteristics were also typical.

During the early stages of development, the Prairie was internally known as "The Nissan 1.6m High Multipurpose Sedan." The design was strongly inspired by the Lancia Megagamma concept by Giorgetto Giugiaro and ItalDesign, shown in 1979, and offered Japanese buyers a spacious, flexible passenger/cargo arrangement that complied with Japanese Government dimension regulations and used small displacement engines that offered Japanese buyers options with regards to annual road tax obligations. Due to the design, the Prairie initially had a Cd of 0.40. In Japan, there was also a van version intended for commercial use, called the Prairie NV (also referred to as the Prairie Estate). This only came with the smallest engine, bare-bones equipment, fender mirrors, and was available with either three or six seats.

The first generation Prairies were innovative vehicles - featuring no B-pillar between the front and rear doors (instead the interlocking front and sliding rear doors locked onto both the floor and roof of the vehicle); front seatbelts mounted on the doors (excluding the US versions) that facilitated a totally unimpeded side entrance; front seats that could be slid all the way to the front of the passenger compartment and fully reclined; rear seats that could not only be folded away conventionally, but could also be reclined fully to make a double bed (in combination with the front seats); rear window winders that folded into themselves (to prevent catching when the doors were slid open); tailgate that opened past the floor of the very low and flat luggage compartment (the center section of the rear bumper was mounted on the tailgate); optional front-facing third row of seats. This type of entry was later introduced on the Toyota Isis, but only on the passenger side.

It was originally launched in Japan with a 1.5- or 1.8-litre inline-four engine mated to a five-speed gearbox. Another notable addition to the Japanese market's models was an optional column shifted manual, which allowed for an additional seat in front. This seat had no belt until November 1986, when revised safety rules forced the addition of a waist belt for the middle occupant. A four-wheel drive version followed later in the car's life. An extensive accessories and options list was available in the Japanese Domestic Market, including a kit that effectively turned the vehicle into a campervan. In January 1985 a facelifted version was introduced, with slightly modified engines. These later cars received a new grille treatment and an entirely redesigned rear end: the bumper was now mounted separately to provide more stability after earlier versions had come under criticism for being much too flexible. This redesign also included taller, flush-fit rear side windows. In September 1985 the 4WD model finally appeared, using a larger 2-litre engine and the rear axle from the Nissan Sunny 4WD (B12). A 4WD model had been planned from the beginning, but the original bodyshell's lack of rigidity made Nissan rethink the concept.

The Japanese lineup was lightly revised in November 1986 to meet new safety requirements. Aside from adding a waist belt for the center front occupant in all eight-seater models, the passenger versions also now received a waist belt for the middle occupant in the second row, standard halogen headlamps, and laminated windshield glass. The NV Estate (commercial use) variant did not receive most of these upgrades. Two special editions were also released later on in the Prairie's life: In September 1987 the 4WD JW-L Nordica Version appeared, limited to 300 units, in two-tone black and grey with stripes and Nordica logos, alloy wheels, a roof rack, power steering and mirrors, and special upholstery which matched the exterior. The final special edition was the Cycle Sports Version of May 1988, which came equipped with a standard bicycle carrier.

=== European market ===
The vehicle was launched as the Datsun Prairie in Europe and was rebranded to Nissan along with the rest of the range from 1984, at first featuring "Datsun by Nissan" badging and then solely "Nissan" badging from 1985. However, as Prairie was a slow but steady seller, some instrument clusters remained with the Datsun script featuring on the centre of the speedometer. Nissan tried, with partial success, to cover over the script a grey sticker over the plastic fascia of the instruments, rather than on the speedometer itself. The 1.5-litre engine was dropped from the UK market sometime after the 1986 facelift with the 1.8 becoming the sole engine offered. From the facelift (larger front lights, larger front indicators with additional side repeat indicators, trim improvements, redesigned rear tail light clusters) onwards the UK model was available either in 1.5 GL, 1.8 SGL or 1.8 SGL Anniversary II specification (featuring two-tone paint, electric front windows, electric steel sliding sunroof, power assisted steering and a dealer applied 'Anniversary II' badge on the tailgate). The Prairie was sold with a 3-year 100,000 mile warranty and a 6-year anti-corrosion warranty.

The European 1.5 produces 70 PS (51 kW), while the later 2.0 offered 102 PS (75 kW). Four-wheel-drive was introduced along with the larger engine.

== Second generation (M11; 1988) ==
Second generation (M11)
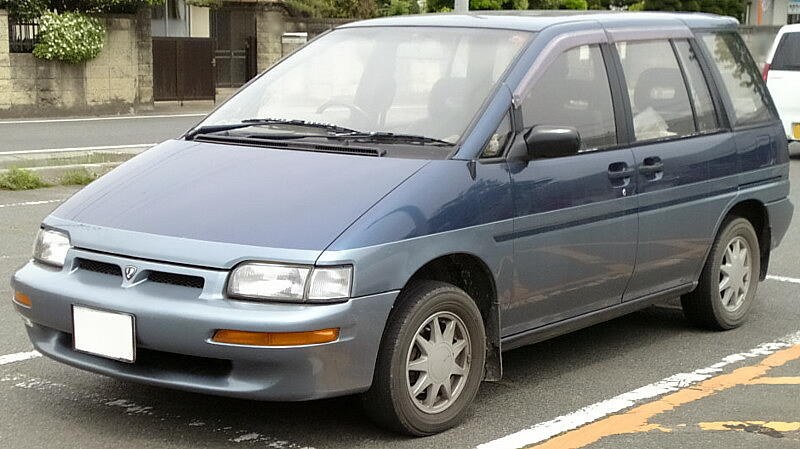

Overview
- Also called: Nissan Axxess
- Production: 1988–1998
- Model years: 1990 (US); 1990–1995 (Canada)
- Assembly: Nissan Shatai Shonan, Hiratsuka, Kanagawa, Japan

Body and chassis
- Related: Nissan Avenir; Nissan Bluebird (U12); Nissan Stanza

Powertrain
- Engine: Petrol: 2.0 L CA20S I4; 2.0 L SR20DE I4; 2.4 L KA24E I4
- Transmission: 4-speed automatic 5-speed manual

Dimensions
- Wheelbase: 2,611 mm (102.8 in)
- Length: 4,366 mm (171.9 in)
- Width: 1,689 mm (66.5 in)
- Height: 1,641 mm (64.6 in)
- Curb weight: 2,910 lb (1,320 kg)

Chronology
- Successor: Nissan Quest (North America); Nissan Serena (Europe)

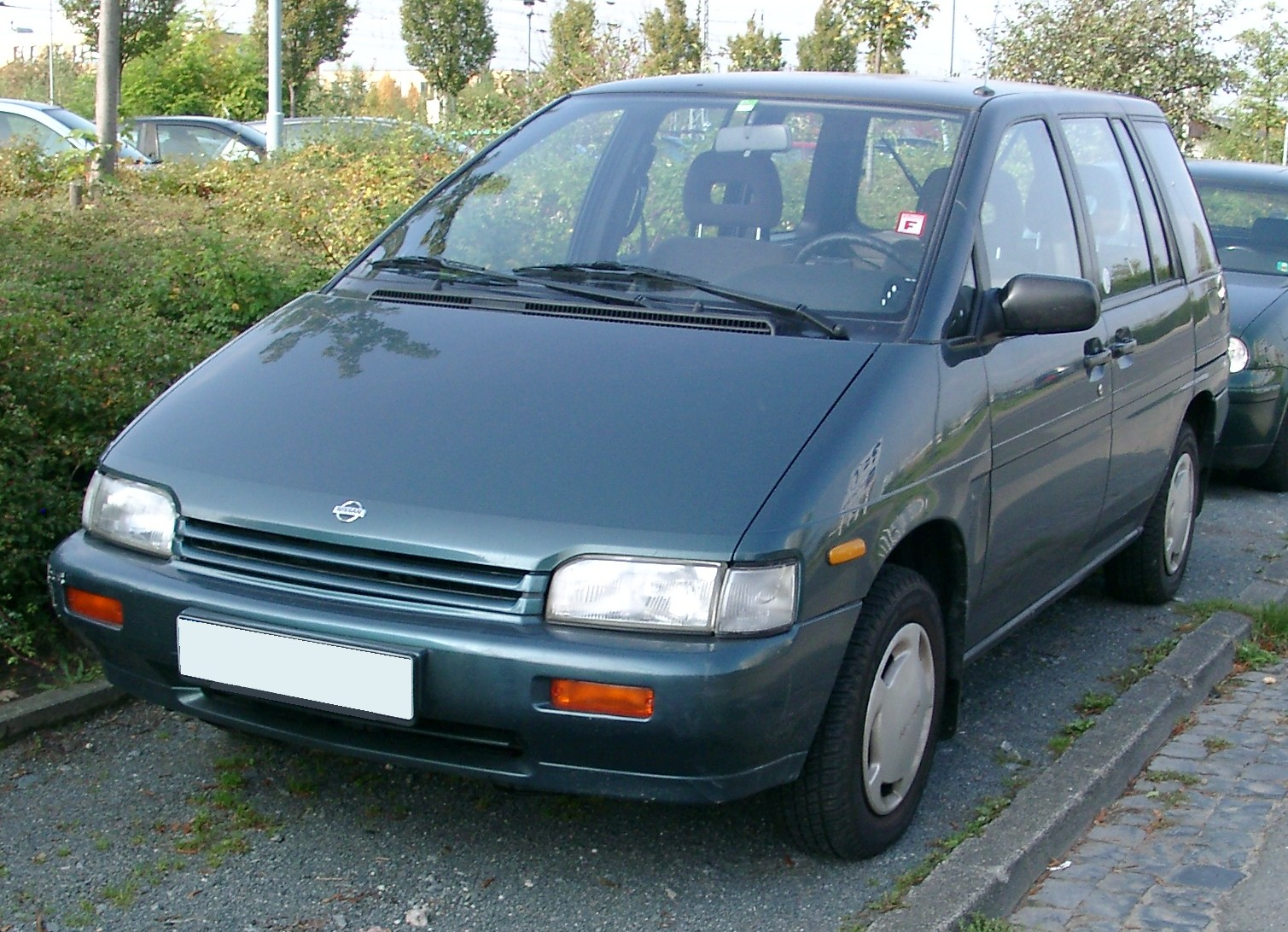
1992 Nissan Prairie (European-spec)

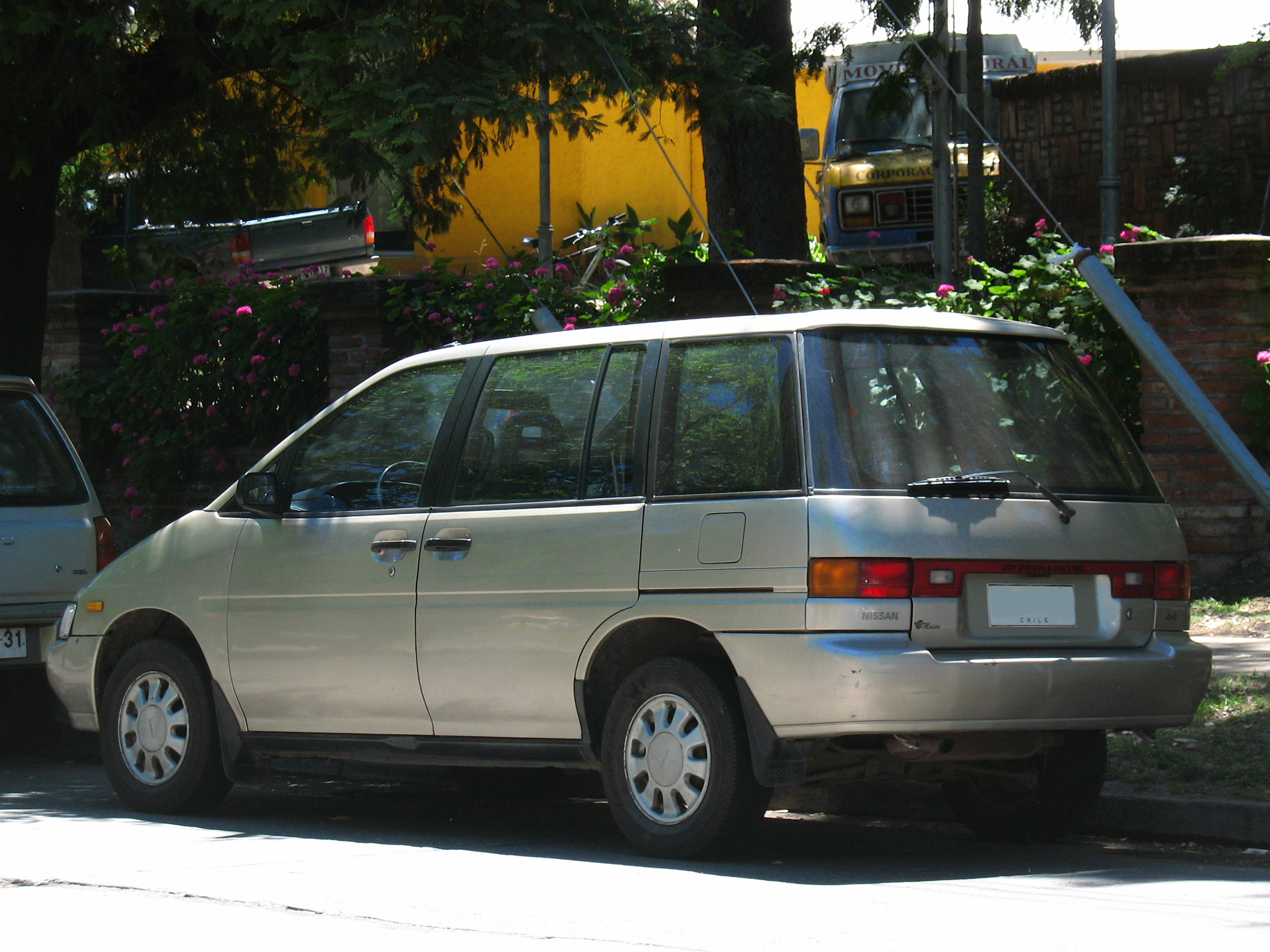
Nissan Prairie 4x4 rear

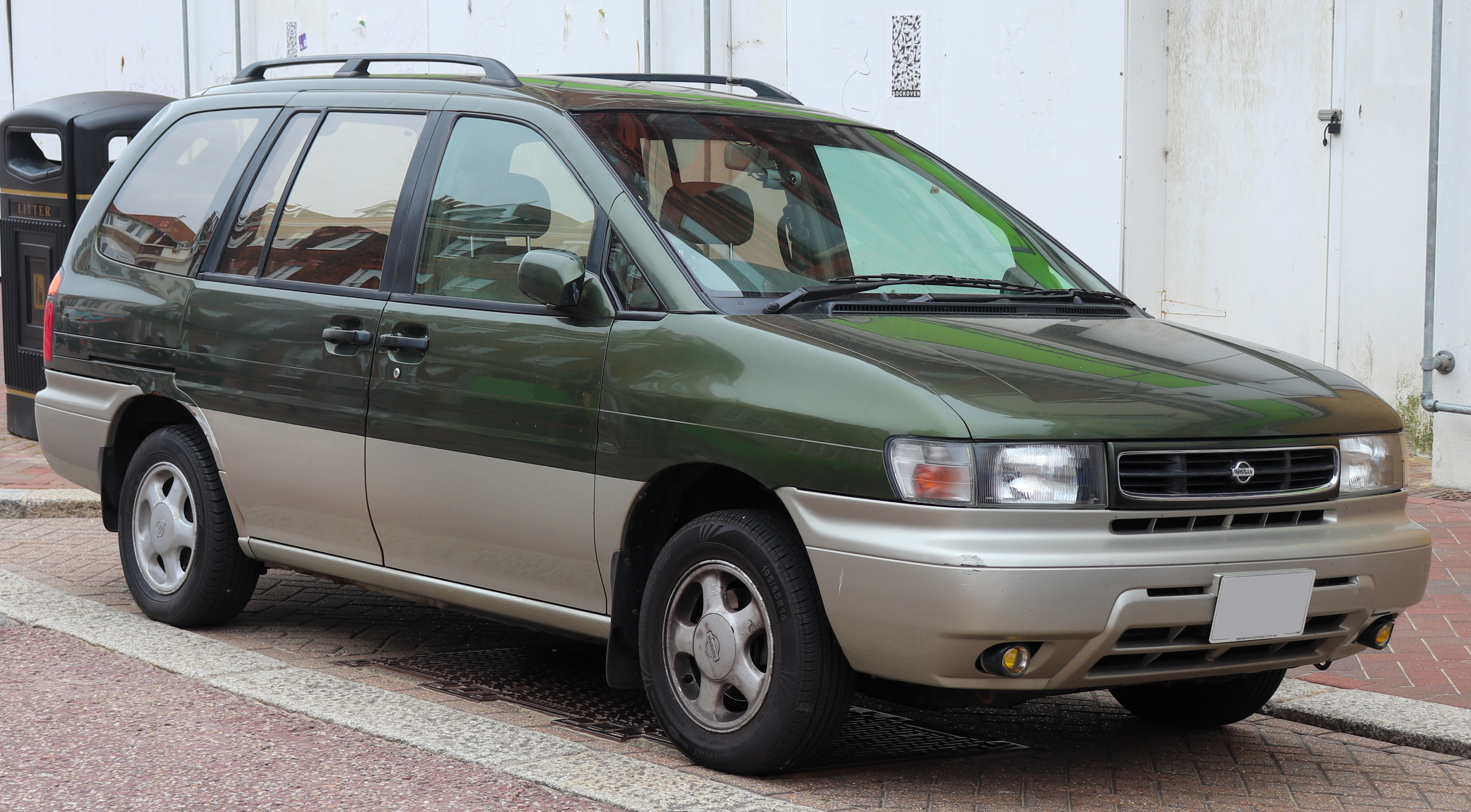

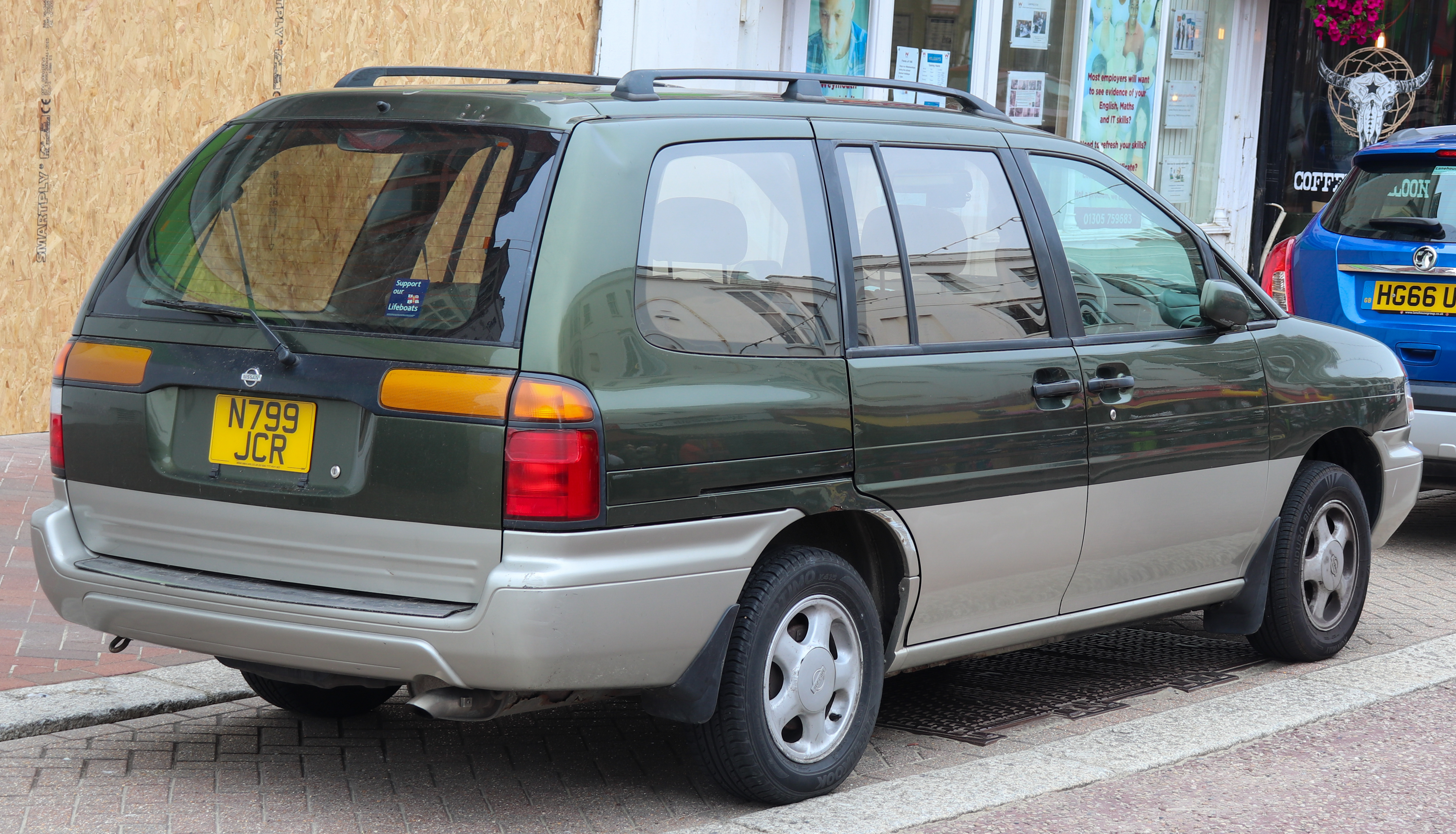
Nissan Prairie Joy (Japan-spec)

The second generation of the Prairie was introduced September 1988 and marketed as the Axxess in North America. To meet concerns that the original bodyshell was too weak, the platform used was upgraded from the smaller Nissan Sunny to the larger Nissan Bluebird. The engines were correspondingly bigger as well. The second generation Prairie lost some of the innovative features that made the first generation standout - the B-pillar was reinstated, the torsion beam rear suspension was replaced with a more conventional coil setup which prevented the rear seats from reclining. The vehicle sold for six years (1990–95) in Canada, but only for the 1990 model year in the United States, as it was replaced by the Nissan Quest. The U.S. version had motorized automatic seatbelts while the Canadian versions had manual belts.

North American models only offered the larger 2.4-litre engine. Elsewhere the Prairie came with optional AWD and a 2.0-litre engine. In Europe, the Prairie was later replaced with the taller, more van-like Nissan Serena, while the Nissan Quest replaced both the Axxess and the Nissan Van in North America.

=== Nissan Prairie Joy ===
In Japan, Nissan stretched the rear of the vehicle to better accommodate third seat passengers and load carrying, calling the vehicle the Prairie Joy and offering the vehicle in August 1995. Conversions offered a raised roof over the passenger space up to the rear hatch. As of May 1997, anti-lock brakes and driver and front passenger airbags were offered, along with ultraviolet restricting tinted glass.

== Third generation (M12; 1998) ==
Third generation (M12)
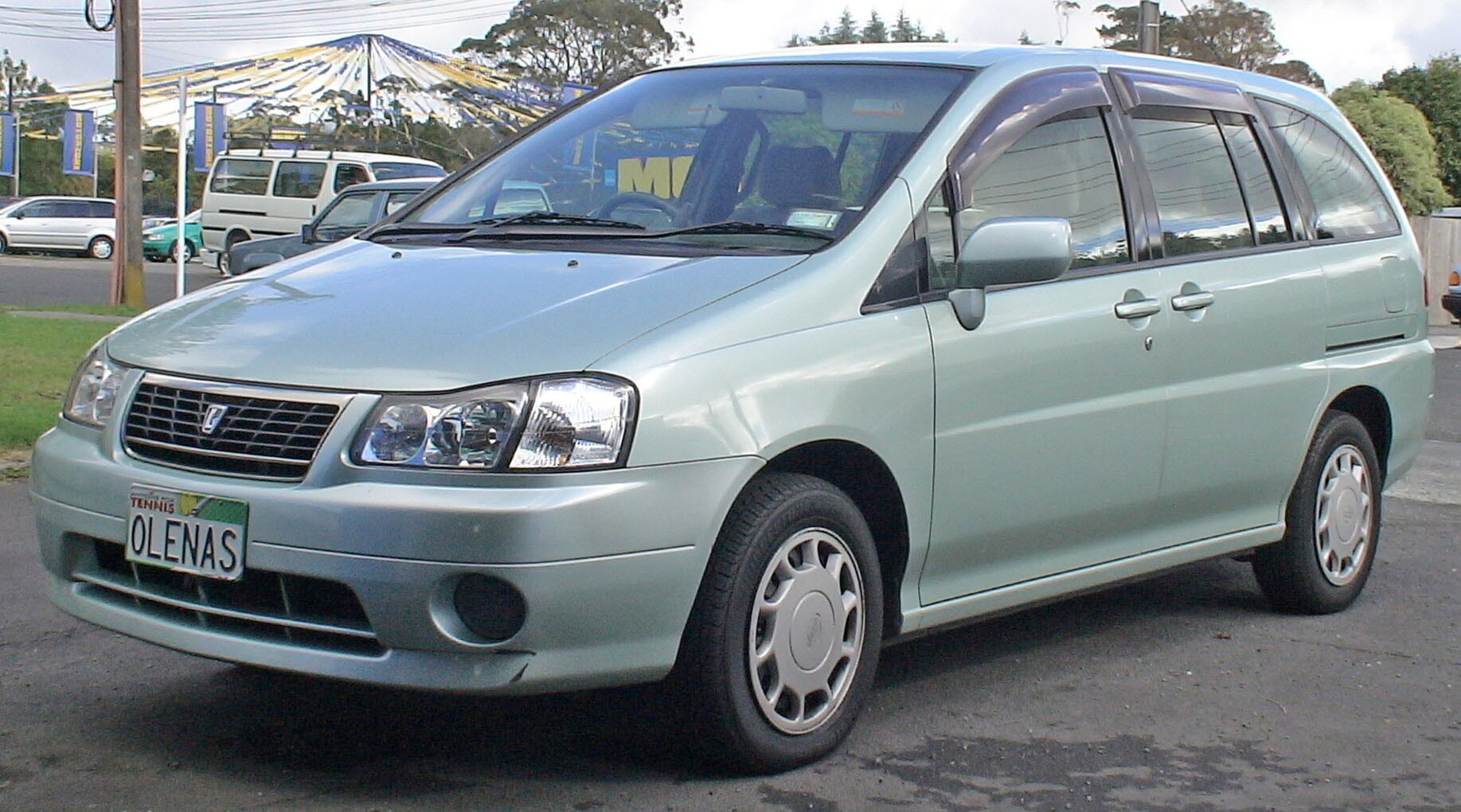
- Nissan Liberty (pre-facelift)

Overview
- Also called: Nissan Liberty
- Production: 1998–2004
- Assembly: Nissan Shatai Shonan, Hiratsuka, Kanagawa, Japan

Body and chassis
- Related: Nissan Avenir

Powertrain
- Engine: Petrol: 2.0 L SR20DE I4; 2.0 L SR20DET turbo I4; 2.0 L QR20DE I4
- Transmission: 4-speed automatic CVT

Dimensions
- Wheelbase: 2,690 mm (105.9 in)
- Length: 4,575 mm (180.1 in)
- Width: 1,695 mm (66.7 in)
- Height: 1,690 mm (66.5 in)
- Curb weight: 1,630 kg (3,594 lb)

Chronology
- Successor: Nissan Lafesta

For this generation, the car's name was changed to Nissan Liberty in Japan, while in Hong Kong and Singapore, it retained the Prairie name. It has rear sliding doors and was available with either front-wheel drive or all-wheel drive. It is equipped with either the SR20DE or the SR20DET engine, both of which are mated to either a 4-speed automatic or a CVT transmission.

The third generation Prairie now shared a platform with the compact station wagon Nissan Avenir with the Prairie/Liberty focused more on flexible seating and cargo carrying duties.

Some of the issues buyers had with the Prairie was its appearance and performance, so the styling was given more attention, and Nissan's Autech division punched up its performance image, by offering the Liberty Rider that replaced the Axis trim package. The turbocharged engine was offered in the "Highway Star 4WD" package October 12, 1999, as well as the "Highway Star GT4", also enhanced by Autech. Front wheel drive vehicles were only available with the CVT transmission. Styling and luxury items offered on the larger Nissan Elgrand were also offered on the Liberty.

The Liberty saw competition from Toyota and Honda during this generation from the Toyota Ipsum, Mitsubishi Chariot, and the Honda Stream, and was joined with the new, larger Nissan Presage at Nissan Bluebird Store locations.

From June 19, 2001, Nissan offered a rear door that swung up electrically, with a platform that extended out for passengers that used a wheelchair, and by remote control. The sliding doors were offered with an electrically opening feature on both sides from May 7, 2001. A facelift appeared in September 2002 and various appearance packages were offered to update the appearance until sales ended in December 2004, and replaced by the all new Nissan Lafesta.

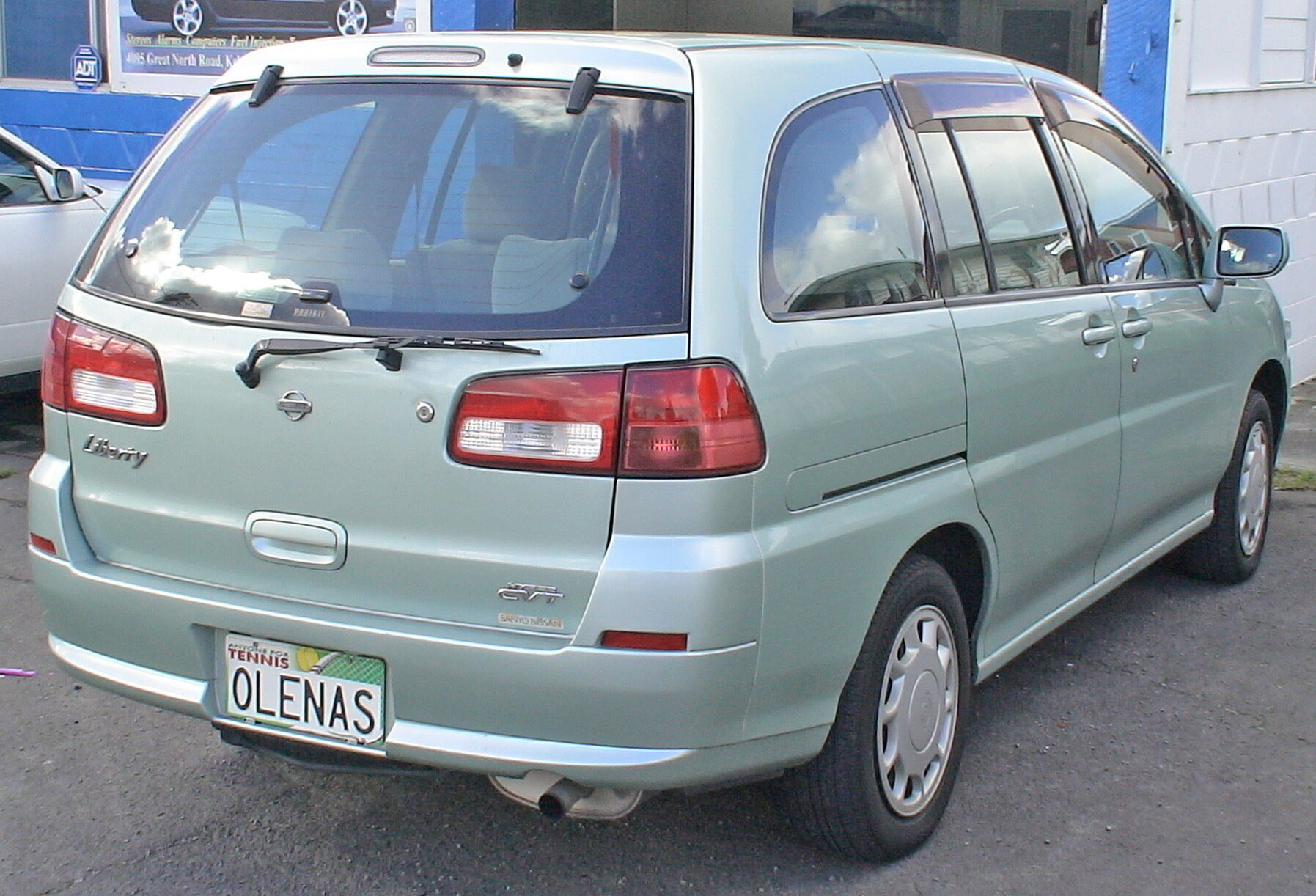
Nissan Liberty (pre-facelift)

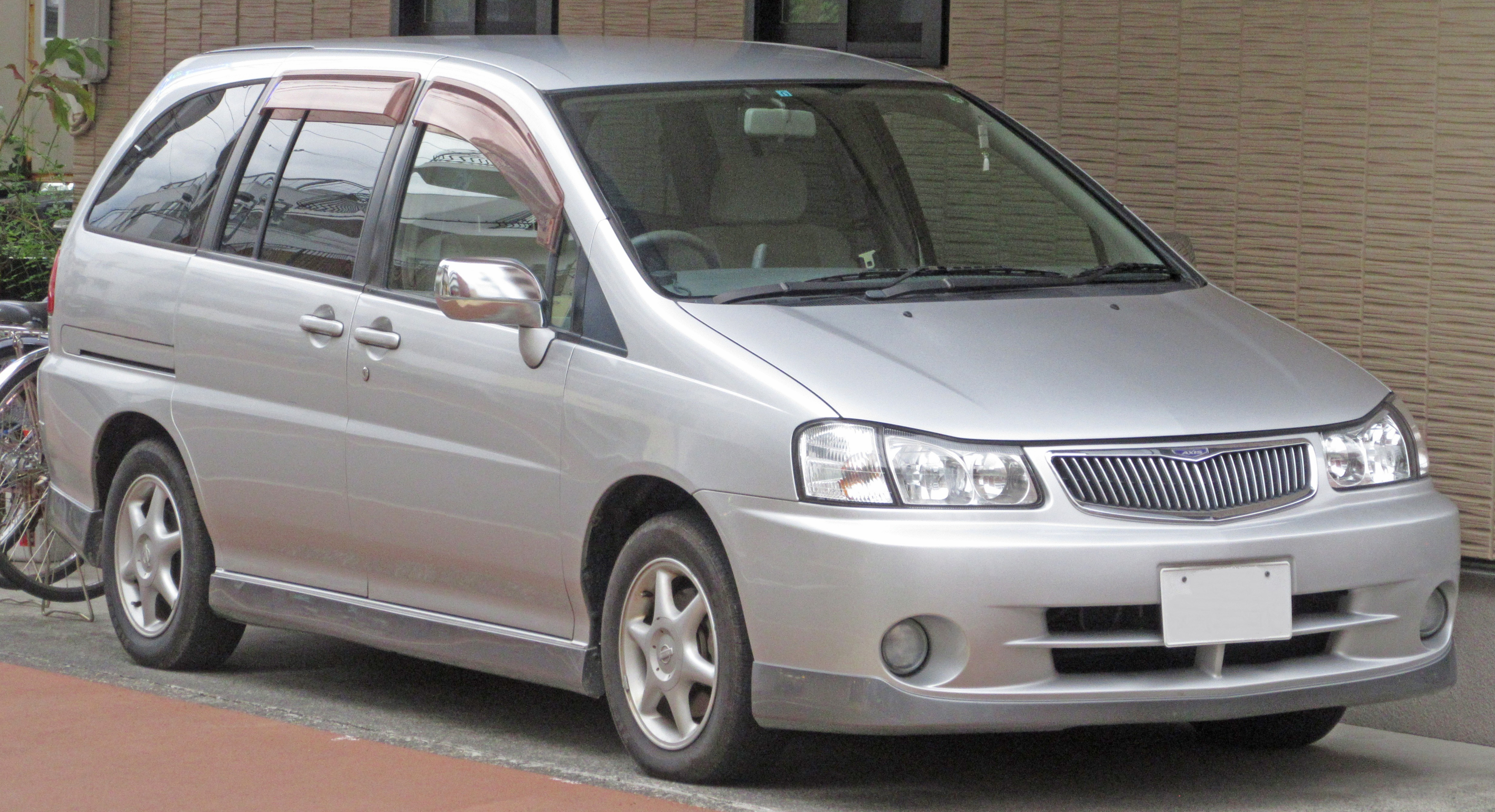
Nissan Liberty Axis (pre-facelift, Japan)

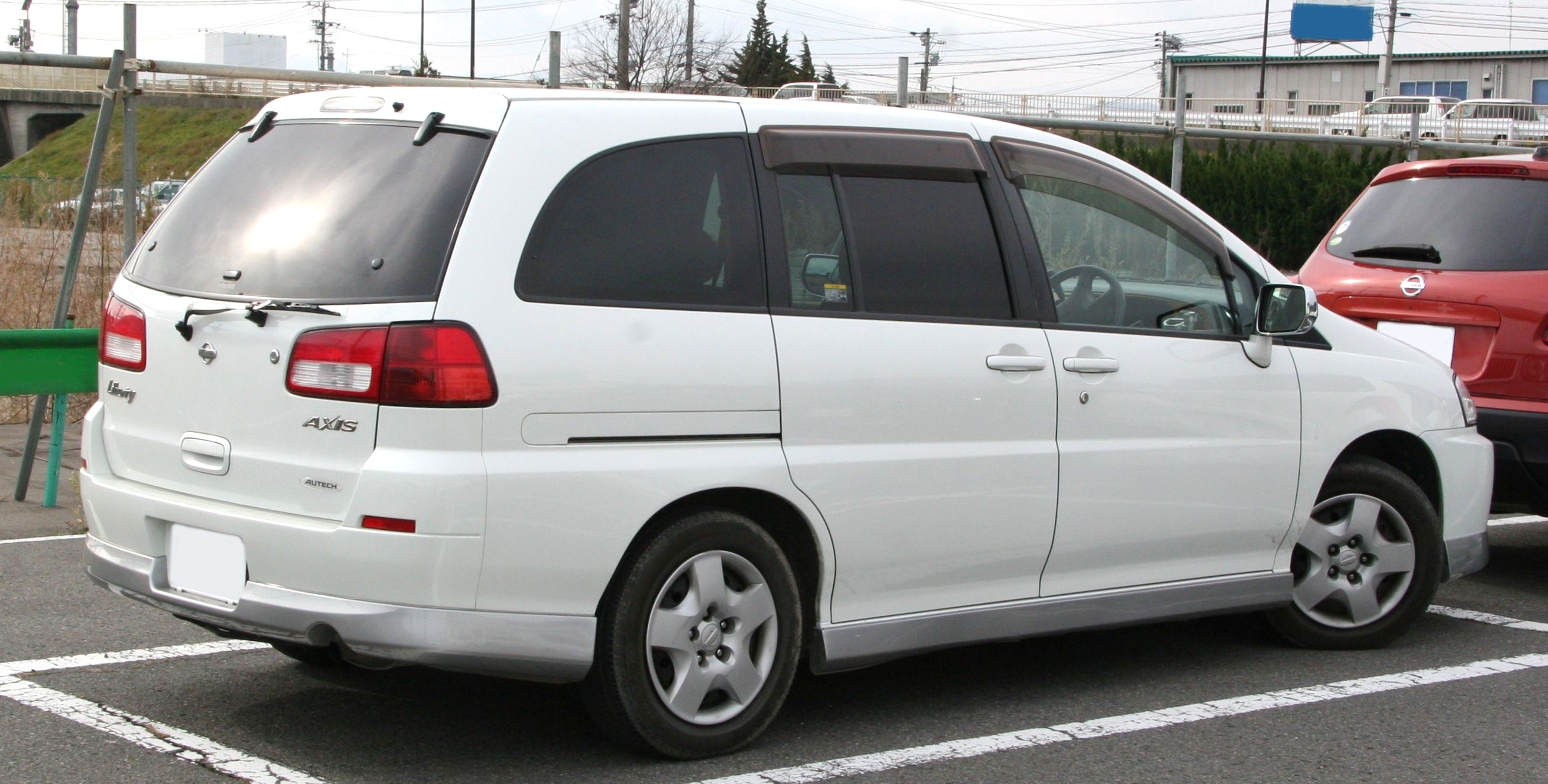
Nissan Liberty Axis (pre-facelift, Japan)

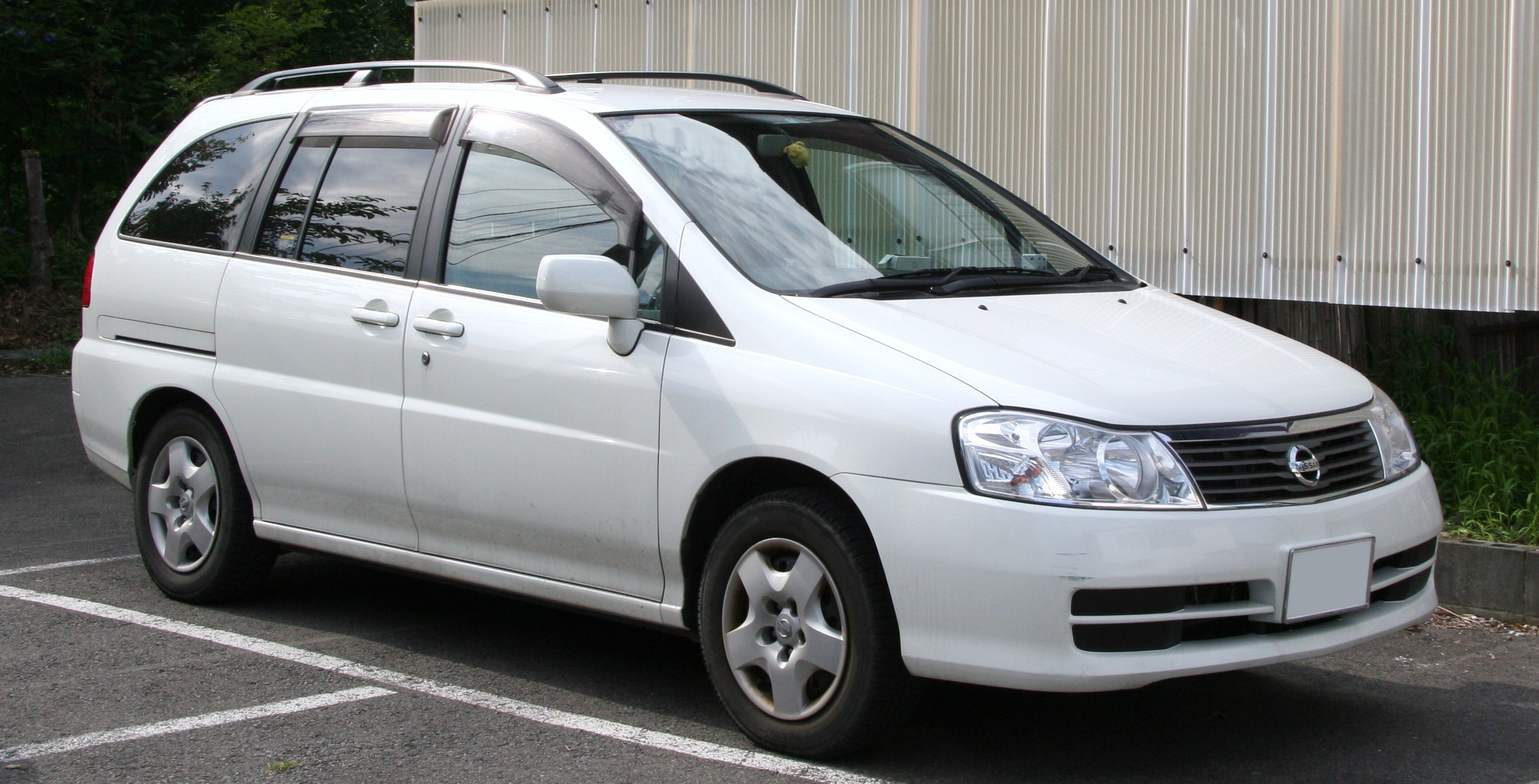
Nissan Liberty (facelift, Japan)

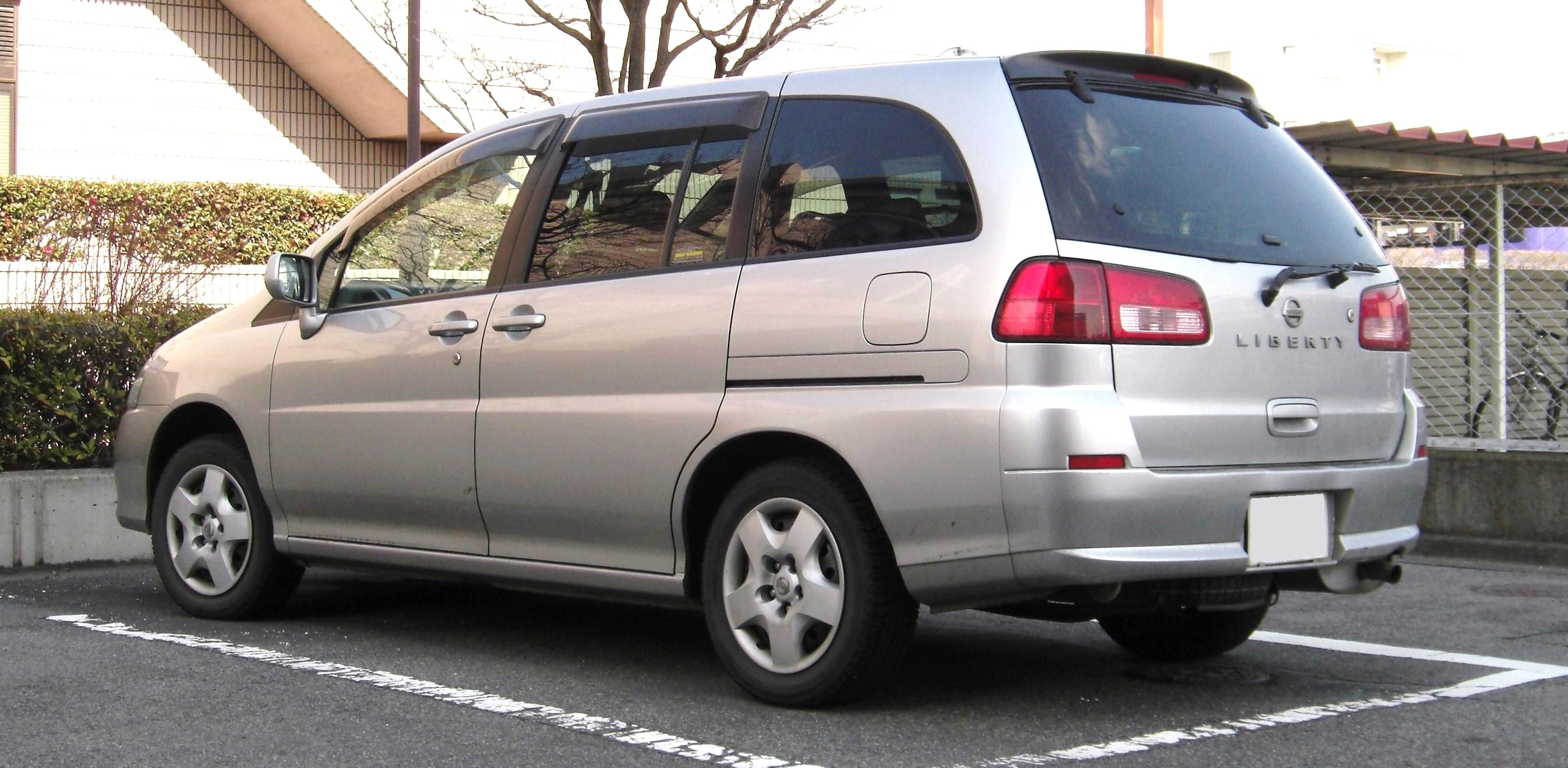
Nissan Liberty (facelift, Japan)

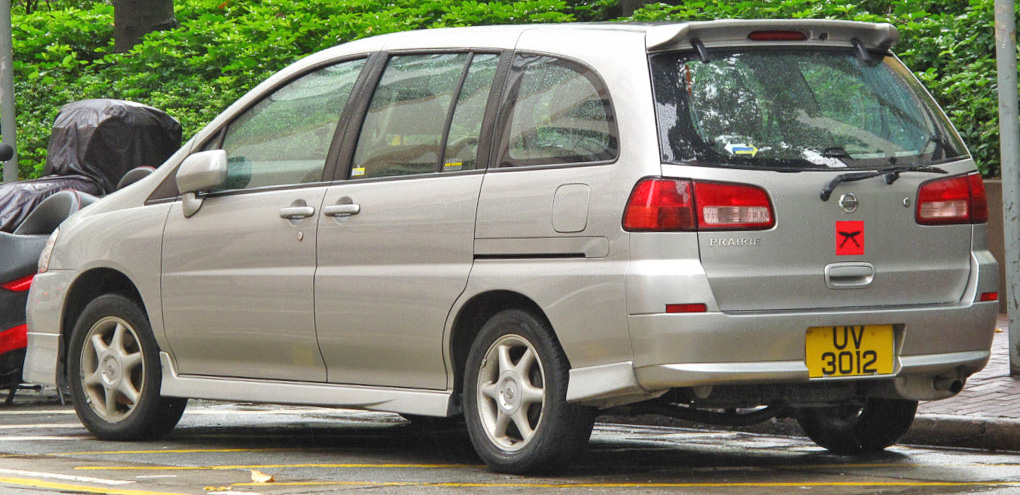
Nissan Prairie (facelift, Hong Kong)

== See also ==
- Lancia Megagamma
- Mitsubishi Chariot
