= Prairie High School =

Prairie High School may refer to one of these North American schools:

- Prairie High School (Alberta), in Three Hills, Alberta, Canada
- Prairie High School (Idaho), in Cottonwood, Idaho, United States
- Prairie High School (Washington), in Brush Prairie (Vancouver area), Washington, United States
- The Prairie School (Wind Point, Wisconsin), United States
- Prairie High School (Iowa), in Cedar Rapids, Iowa, United States
