= Bun LaPrairie =

American ice hockey player

- Born: October 20, 1911 Sault Ste. Marie, Michigan, United States
- Died: April 20, 1986 (aged 74)
- Height: 5 ft 10 in (178 cm)
- Weight: 160 lb (73 kg; 11 st 6 lb)
- Position: Defence
- Shot: Right
- Played for: Chicago Black Hawks
- Playing career: 1934–1937

Benedict Ernest "Bun" LaPrairie (October 20, 1911 – April 20, 1986) was an American ice hockey player who played seven games in the National Hockey League with the Chicago Black Hawks during the 1936–37 season. He was born in Sault Ste. Marie, Michigan.

== Career statistics ==
=== Regular season and playoffs ===
			Regular season					Playoffs
Season	Team	League	GP	G	A	Pts	PIM	GP	G	A	Pts	PIM
1934–35	Chicago Baby Ruth	USAHA	2	1	0	1	—	2	1	0	1	0
1935–36	Kansas City Greyhounds	AHA	47	0	0	0	6	—	—	—	—	—
1936–37	Chicago Black Hawks	NHL	7	0	0	0	0	—	—	—	—	—
1936–37	Minneapolis Millers	AHA	5	0	0	0	6	—	—	—	—	—
AHA totals			52	0	0	0	12	—	—	—	—	—
NHL totals			7	0	0	0	0	—	—	—	—	—
