= CA-16 =

CA-16 may refer to:

- California State Route 16, a highway in the U.S. state of California
- California's 16th congressional district, a congressional district in California
- Nissan CA-16, an engine by Nissan
