= Yue Loong Feeling =

Yue Loong Feeling 101/102
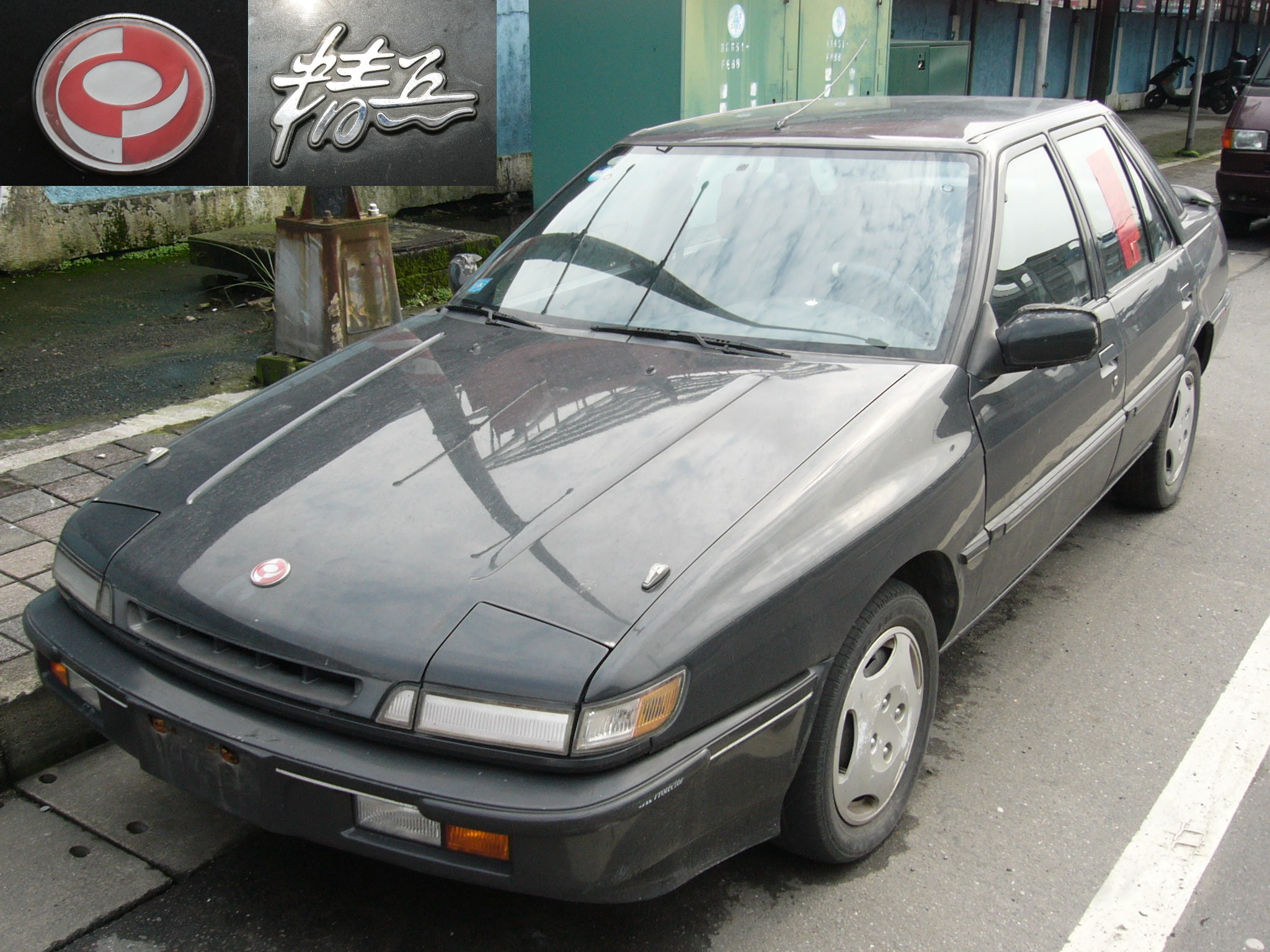
- 1994 Yulon Arex

Overview
- Manufacturer: Yue Loong Motor Company
- Also called: Yulon Arex
- Production: 1986–1995

Body and chassis
- Class: Compact car (C)
- Body style: 5-door notchback 5-door fastback
- Layout: Front engine, front-wheel drive
- Related: Nissan Auster/Stanza

Powertrain
- Engine: 1,598 cc CA16; 1,796 cc CA18, CA18S I4
- Transmission: 5-speed manual 3-speed automatic

Dimensions
- Wheelbase: 2,470 mm (97 in)
- Length: 4,455 mm (175.4 in)
- Width: 1,680 mm (66 in)
- Height: 1,375 mm (54.1 in)
- Curb weight: 1,050–1,070 kg (2,310–2,360 lb)

Chronology
- Predecessor: Yue Loong 706

The Yue Loong Feeling (Chinese: 裕隆飛羚; pinyin: Yùlóng Fēilíng) 101/102 is a compact car built in Taiwan by the Yue Loong Motor Company from 1986 until 1995. It is available in both five-door notchback and five-door fastback body styles.

== History ==
First presented on 25 October 1986, it was heavily based on the T11 Auster/Stanza, built by Yulon's principal associated company and engineering partner Nissan. Despite Yulon having invested heavily in a new R&D center (in Guishan) and having spent five years in development, hiring 300 technicians and spending NT $2 billion in the process, the car failed in the marketplace due to much publicized quality concerns. The Feeling was also marketed abroad (even in Europe), unusual for Taiwanese-built cars. After a disappointing 9,451 built in the first full year, production dropped to a mere 3,846 the second year (1988). The Feeling was even displayed at the 1987 Tokyo Motor Show.

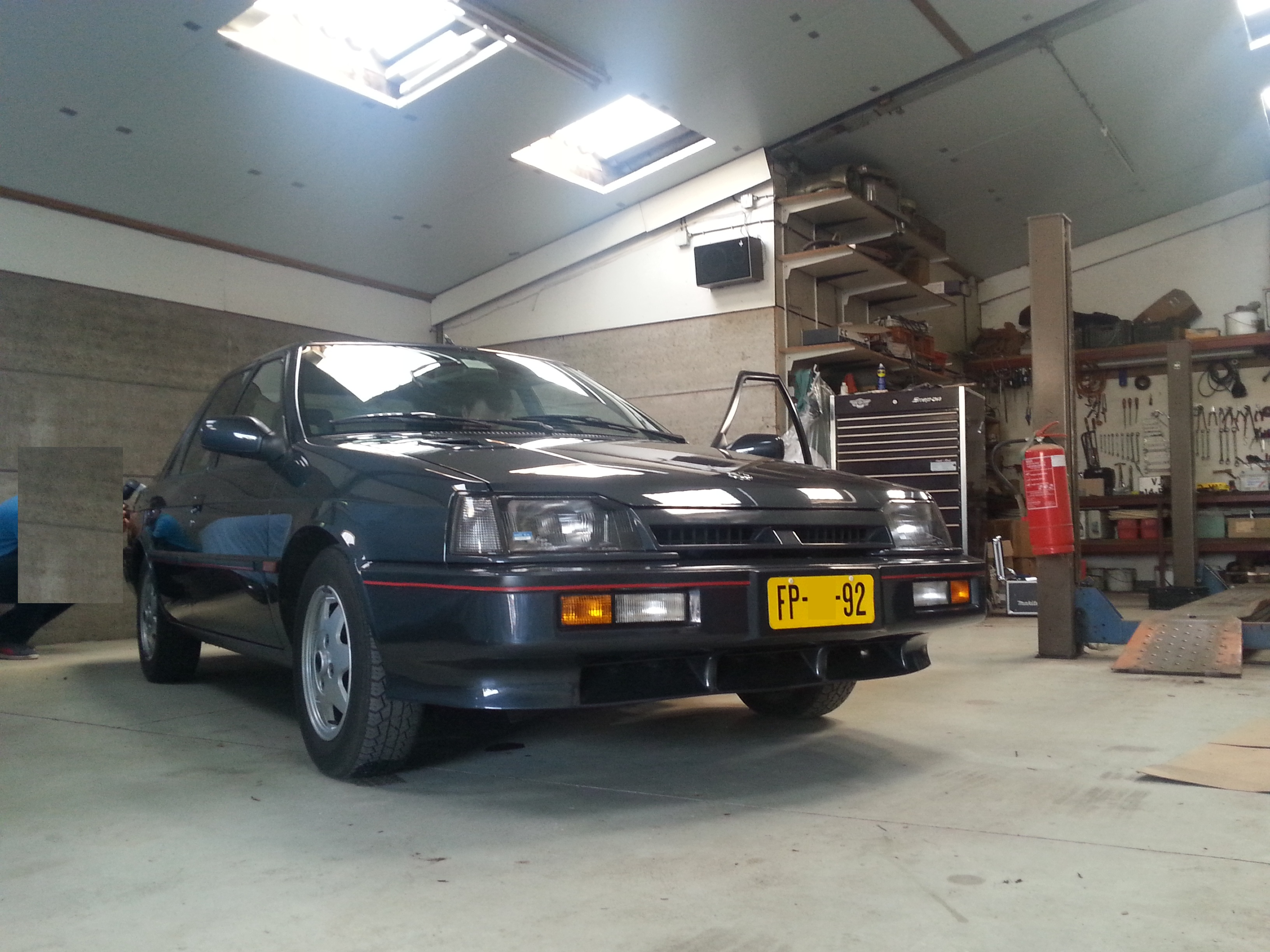
The front of the only Yue Loong Feeling that remains in Europe

The Feeling was recognizable by its unusual three-piece, wrap around rear window. A 1.6- or a 1.8-litre four cylinder Nissan CA gasoline engine was available, with 88 or 97 PS (65 or 71 kW). The 1.6 was added during 1987, complementing the pricier 1.8. Top speeds were 160 and 170 km/h (99 and 106 mph) respectively. The bigger engine's bore was 0.3 mm less than its 1809 cc Nissan counterpart, so as to squeeze beneath Taiwan's 1.8-litre tax threshold. The facelifted Feeling 102 was released in June 1989, when claimed top speeds increased to 180 and 185 km/h for the 1.6 and 1.8 (190 km/h in the notchback 1.8).

The Feeling was imported to the Netherlands by Eurimpo in Ridderkerk (part of the Abemy Group in Sassenheim) during 1992. Brought over in three models (1.6 LS, 1.8 LSX, 1.8 GTX) it failed to make a splash in the marketplace. Only 122 were registered in 1992, with a total of 130 brought in. All examples were then bought back by the importer, who was unable to supply spare parts for the cars. Later it was discovered that one car is still in the Netherlands, in a private collection. Yue Loong's attempt at breaking into the European market was over.

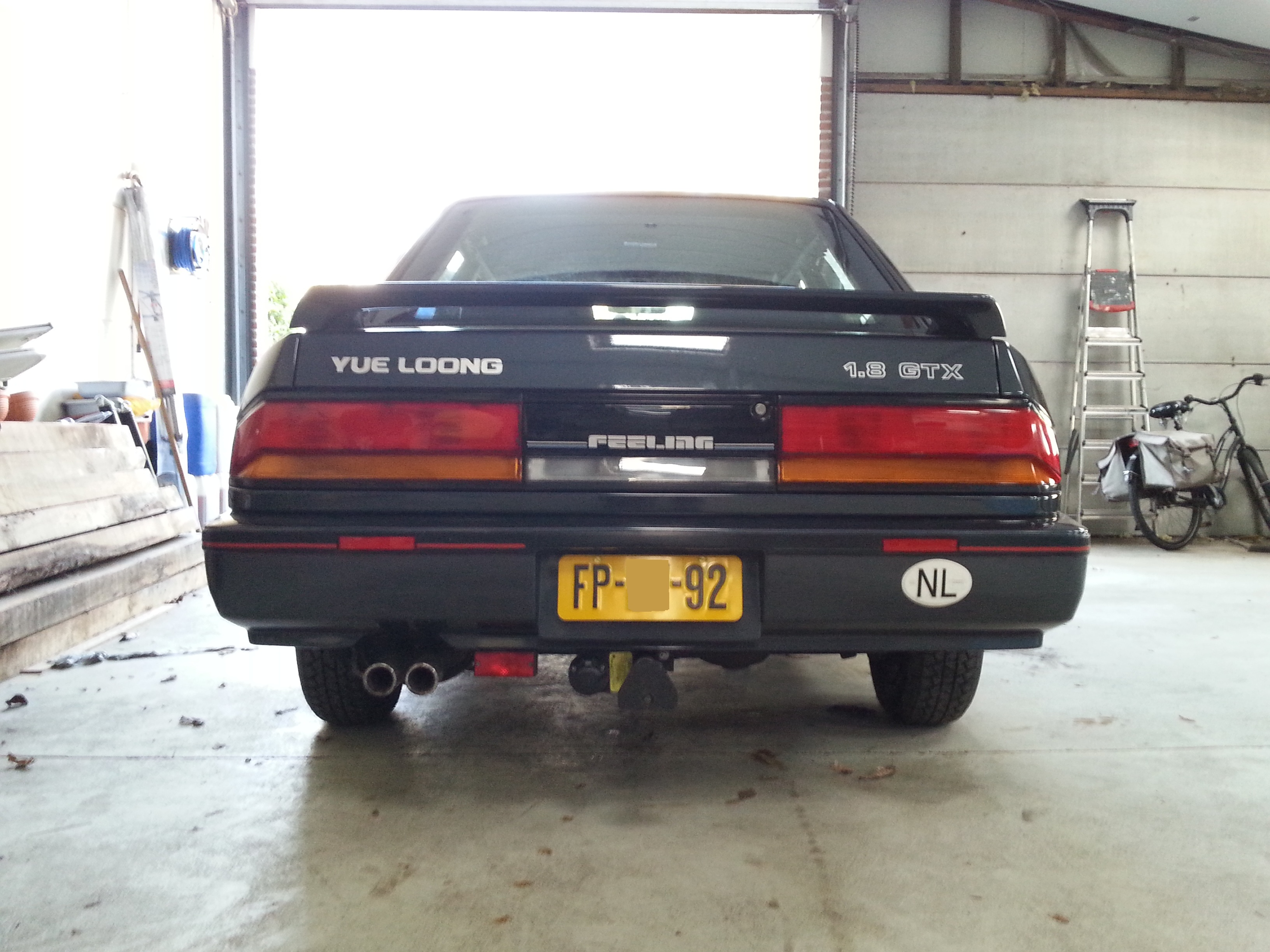
Dutch market Feeling 1.8 GTX; rear end

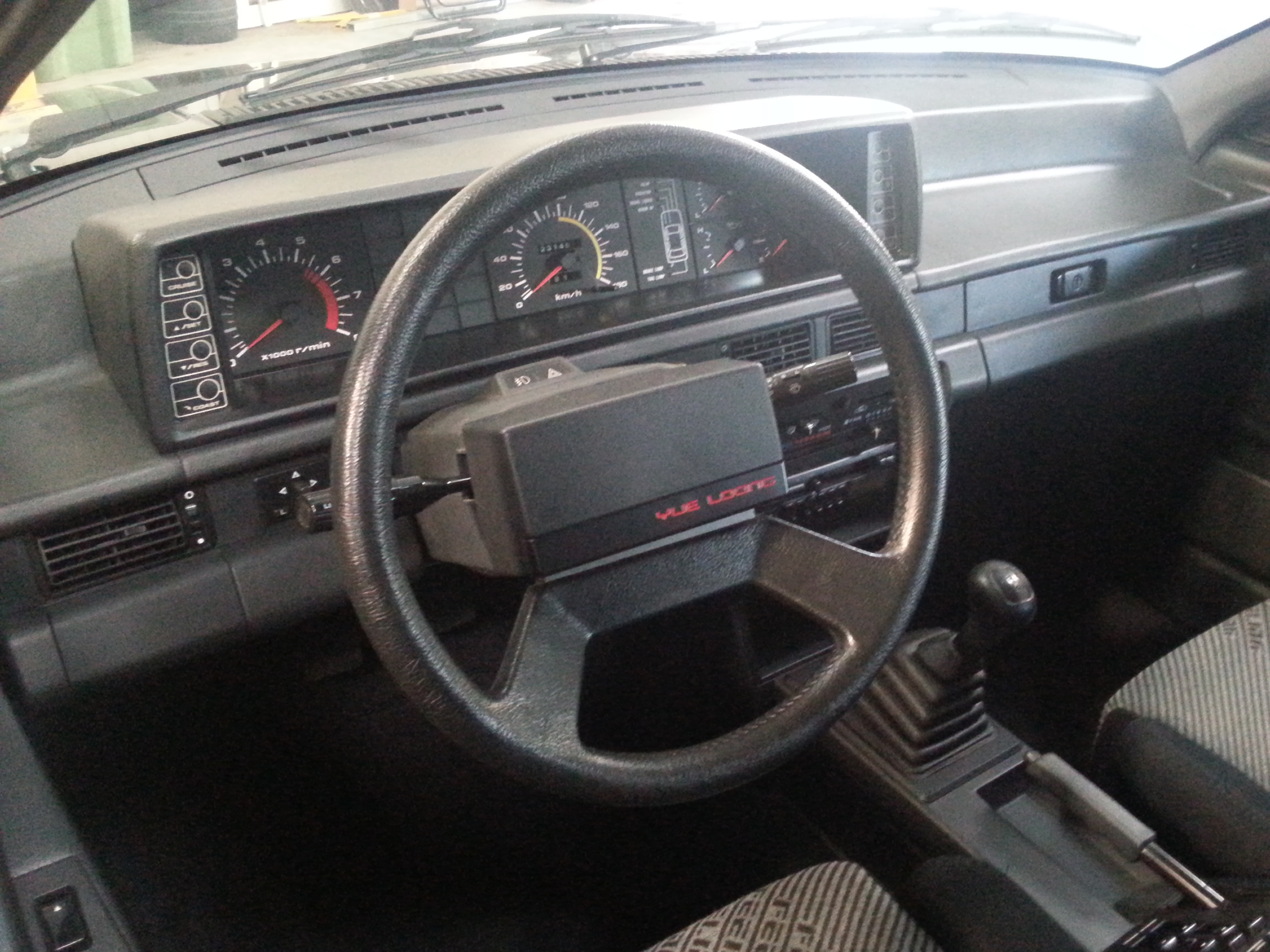
Dashboard

== Yulon Arex ==
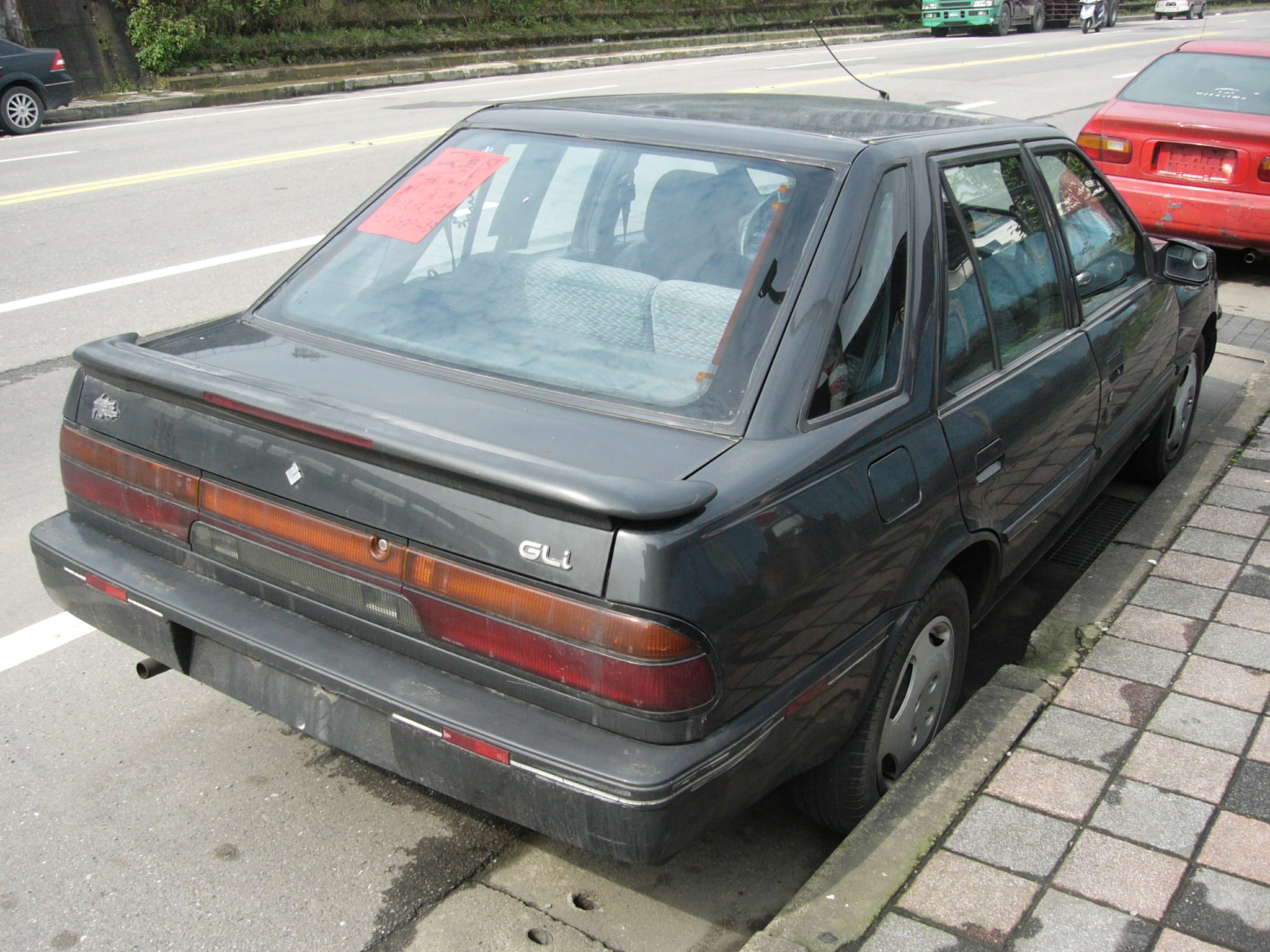
1994 Yulon Arex 1.8 GLi (5-door)

The 102 was replaced by the Yulon 601 Arex (Chinese: 裕隆精兵) 1.8i in summer 1993, by which time the company had switched the romanized version of their name to become "Yulon". The Arex featured a newly designed front with flip-up headlights and blistered fenders, as well as a Lucas fuel injection system which increases power to 103 PS (76 kW) at 5,300 rpm. Top speed remained around 185 km/h (115 mph), depending on bodystyle and transmission. After no more than 4,300 were made, Yulon halted their attempts at making a Taiwanese national car in 1995. In total 27,876 of the three generations of Feelings/Arex were built over a ten-year period; more than half of them were built in the first two years.

== Production ==
Production of Feeling 101, Feeling 102, and Arex
Type	1986	1987	1988	1989	1990	1991	1992	1993	1994	1995	Totals
Feeling 101 1.6		1,034	412								1,446
Feeling 101 1.8	4,685	8,417	2,105								15,207
101 subtotals	4,685	9,451	2,517								16,653
Feeling 102 1.6				681	1,417	81	1	10	3	1	2,194
Feeling 102 1.8				2,786	1,258	560	117	10			4,731
102 subtotals				3,467	2,675	641	118	20	3	1	6,925
Arex 601 1.8							917	758	1,520	1,103	4,298
Annual totals	4,685	9,451	2,517	3,467	2,675	641	1,035	778	1,523	1,104	27,876
