= Nissan EXA =

The Nissan Pulsar EXA and Nissan EXA are automobiles manufactured and marketed by Nissan Motor Company from 1983 to 1986 and from 1986 to 1990 respectively. The first generation model was internally designated as the N12 series and was marketed in Japan at Nissan Cherry Store locations as the Pulsar EXA. The second generation EXA was designated as the N13 series.

Both generations were marketed in North America under the name Nissan Pulsar NX.

== Nissan Pulsar EXA (N12; 1982–1986) ==
Nissan Pulsar EXA (N12)
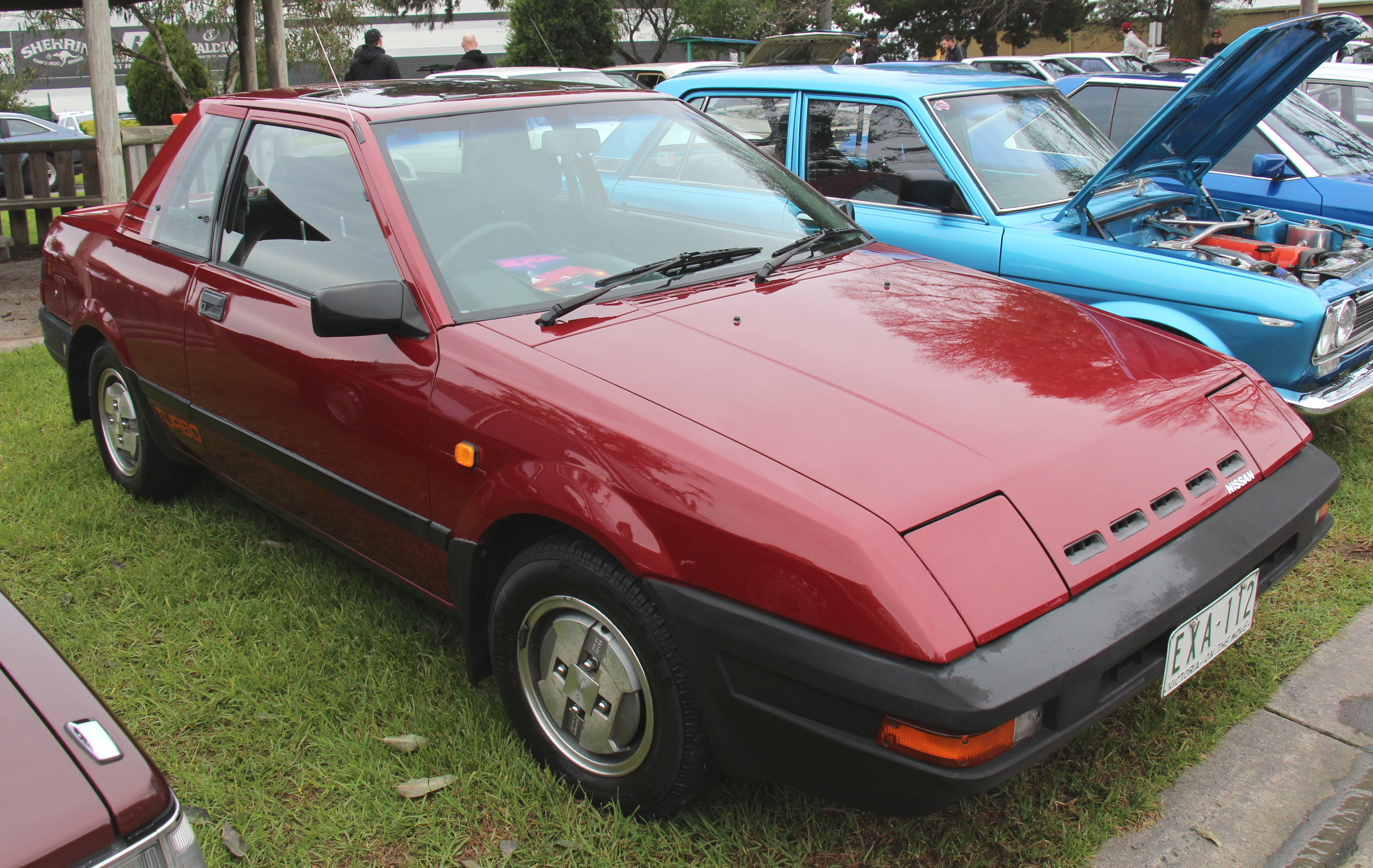
- Nissan Pulsar EXA Turbo (Australia)

Overview
- Also called: Nissan Pulsar NX (USA); Nissan Langley EXA (ZA)
- Production: 1982–1986
- Assembly: Japan

Body and chassis
- Body style: 2-door coupé 2-door convertible
- Layout: Transverse front-engine, front-wheel drive
- Related: Nissan Sunny (B11); Nissan Pulsar (N12)

Powertrain
- Engine: 1270 cc E13 I4; 1488 cc E15S/E I4; 1488 cc E15ET turbo I4; 1597 cc E16S I4

Dimensions
- Wheelbase: 2,415 mm (95.1 in)
- Length: 4,125 mm (162.4 in)
- Width: 1,620 mm (63.8 in)
- Height: 1,355 mm (53.3 in)
- Curb weight: 795–885 kg (1,753–1,951 lb)

The Pulsar EXA followed a successful strategy Nissan used in Japan of offering the economical Nissan Sunny in an affordable, youth-oriented two-door coupé, demonstrated by the Nissan Sunny fastback coupé, which had been offered since the Sunny's introduction in 1966. As the Pulsar was a companion to the Nissan Sunny, but offered at a different Japanese Nissan dealership called Nissan Cherry Store, the Pulsar EXA mirrored the tradition of the Sunny Coupé. The Pulsar/Cherry line was originally developed by Prince Motor Company previous to the 1966 merger of the two companies; by the early 1980s Prince still maintained a separate design center in Ogikubo, Tokyo and this is where the Pulsar EXA was developed. It was available from 1982 to 1986 and came with several of the engines also seen in the regular Pulsars. The Pulsar EXA was known in North America as the Pulsar NX and shared many of its parts with the Nissan Sentra.

The car's shape was determined using computer-aided design (CAD), with the body engineers working closely with the designers. The design brief was to make a distinctive, aerodynamic shape while utilizing as many standard Pulsar and Sunny components as possible. Early iterations featured a large, glass "bubble-back" rear end similar to the Renault Fuego, but since the contemporary Sunny/Sentra Coupé was to be a fastback, the Pulsar EXA was changed to a notchback profile with a near perpendicular rear windshield to set the two cars apart in the marketplace. The car's peculiar upright styling is also partially due to the decision to use the regular Pulsar's rather tall windshield and cowl. Instead of using the oval-themed dashboard from the Pulsar hatchback or sedan, the EXA/NX received a more angular design also used for the Pulsar's sister cars the Langley and the Liberta Villa.

When first introduced to the Japanese market in April 1982, the Pulsar EXA received two versions of the E15 engine, either carburetted or fuel injected. In May 1983 the turbocharged E15ET engine was introduced, producing 115 PS (85 kW; 113 hp) at 5600 rpm. The same spec was used on cars exported to Singapore, where the top speed was listed as 185 km/h (115 mph) with a 0-100 km/h acceleration time of 8.8 seconds. At this time, a door mirror became standard on the EXA rather than the traditional fender-mounted unit. Fender-mounted mirrors had been required by law until March 1983 and the Pulsar EXA was the first Japanese car to be equipped with door-mounted mirrors in the domestic market.

The Pulsar EXA convertible was a limited-edition model released to commemorate the 15th anniversary of the Nissan Cherry Japanese dealership chain, through which the Nissan Pulsar was marketed in Japan. It was launched in May 1985, and just 100 vehicles were made available for the whole of Japan. This version sports numerous special accessories, including a soft top made from a special insulating material to keep out the rain and heat, and a rear window made from organic glass to ensure high visibility.

=== Export markets ===
In North America, where it arrived for model year 1983, it received the carburetted, naturally aspirated E16S engine as also fitted to the Sentra. Not exactly a sporting proposition, the long-stroke E16S produces 69 hp (51 kW; 70 PS) at 5,200 rpm and was unwilling and noisy in the upper powerband. A fuel injected turbocharged E15ET engine was added later to give the car more sporting credentials; the turbo engine produces 100 hp (75 kW; 101 PS) at 5,600 rpm. Transmission options were a 5-speed manual or a three-speed automatic, both of them available with either engine.

In September 1983, Nissan Australia released the two-door Pulsar EXA coupé with the 1.5-liter turbocharged engine. This model develops 77 kW (105 PS; 103 hp) at 6500 rpm.

In South Africa, this model was sold as the Langley EXA, as the sedan version of the Pulsar went by that name. The Langley EXA was available with the 1.5-litre engine in South Africa as elsewhere, either turbocharged or naturally aspirated.

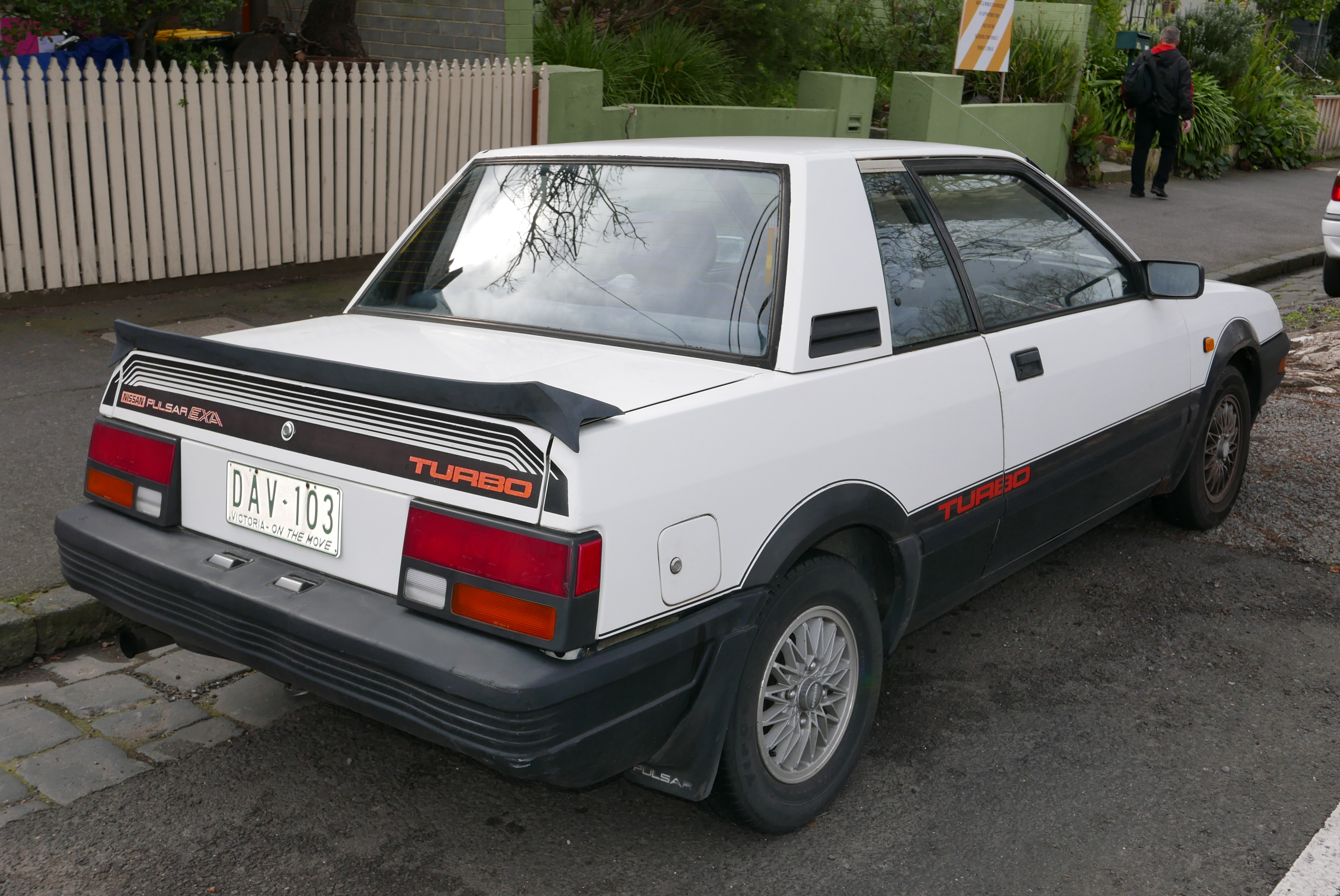
Nissan Pulsar EXA Turbo (Australia)

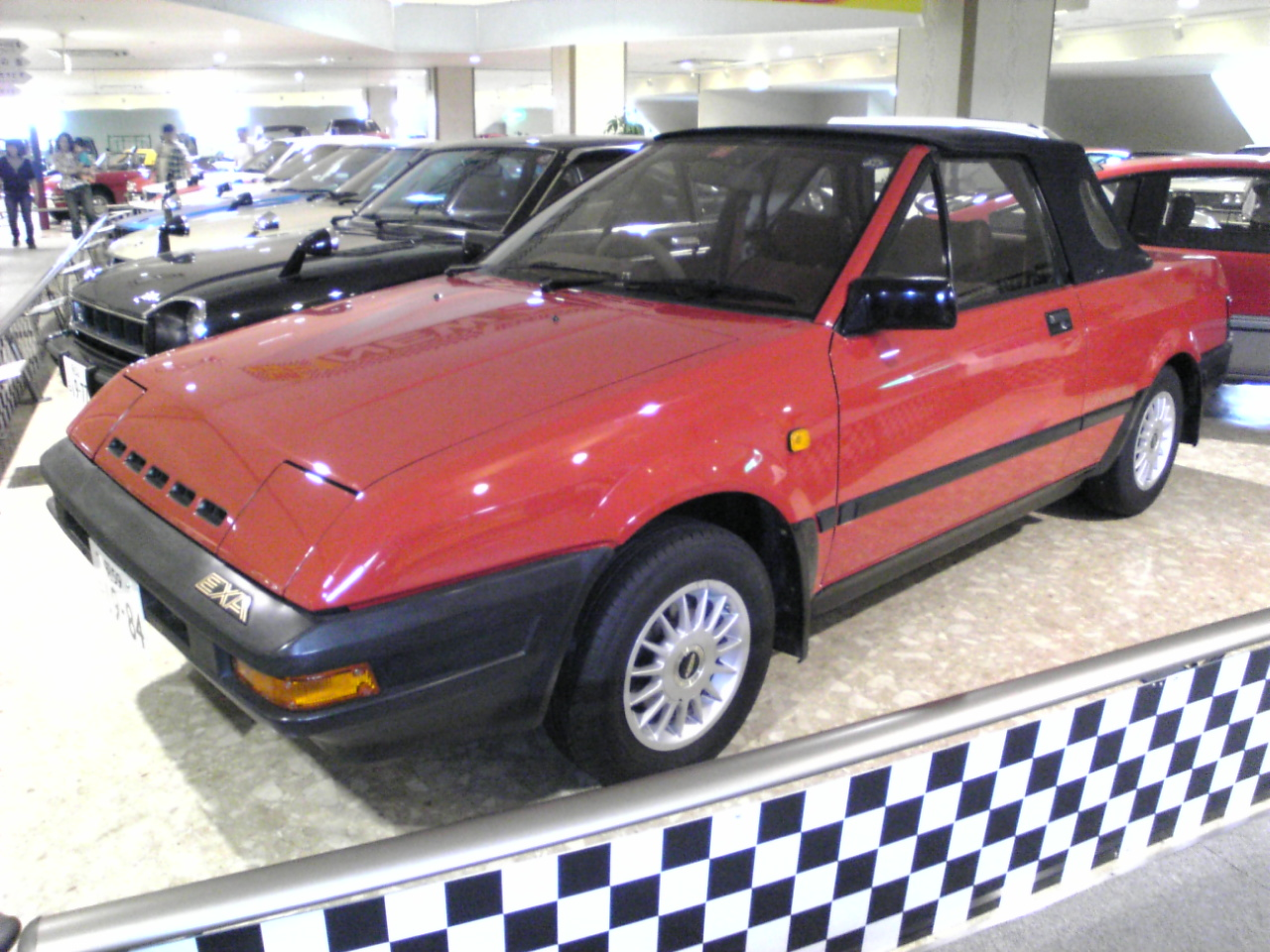
Nissan Pulsar EXA convertible (Japan)

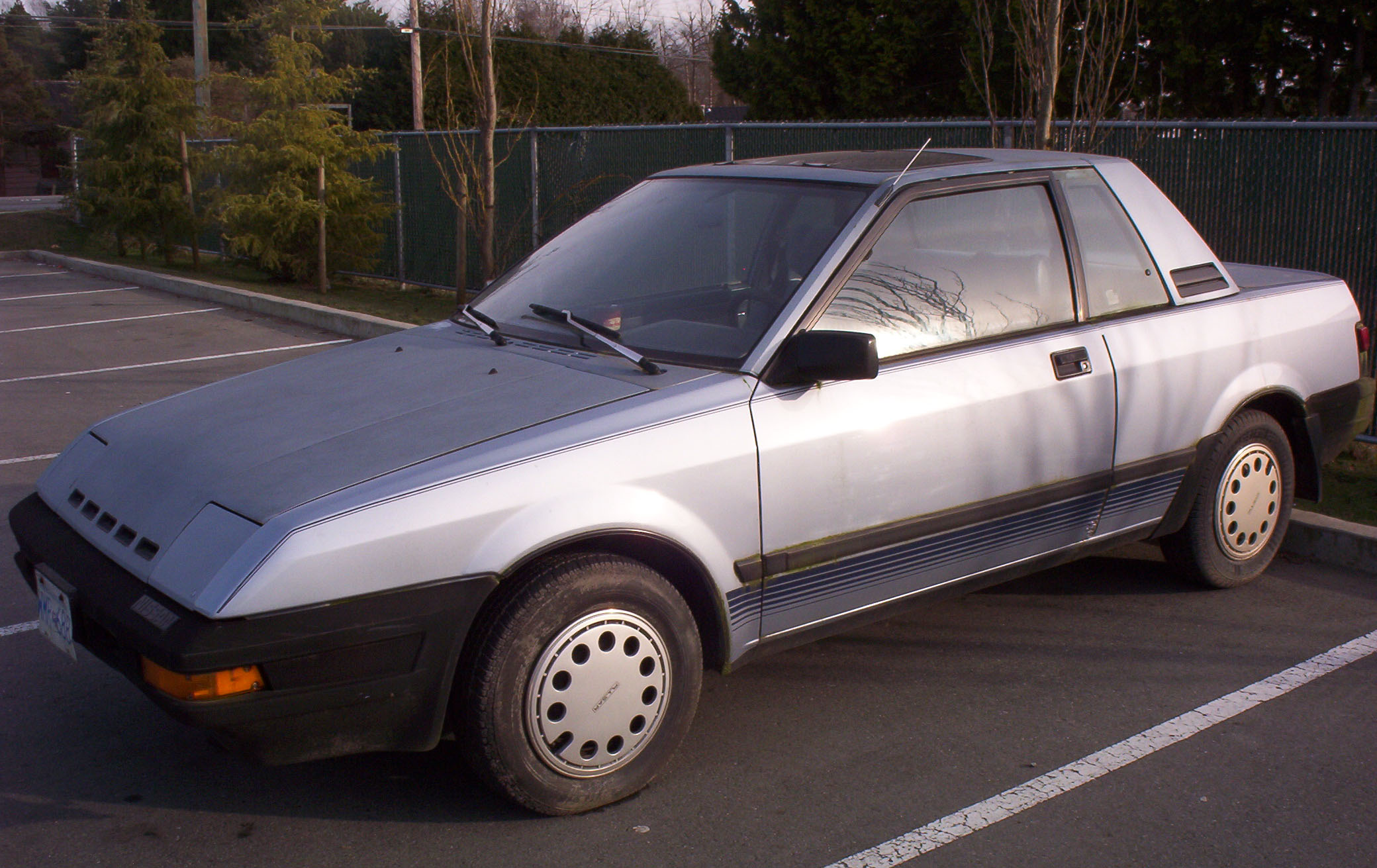
US-market Nissan Pulsar NX

== Nissan EXA (N13; 1986–1990) ==
Nissan EXA (N13)
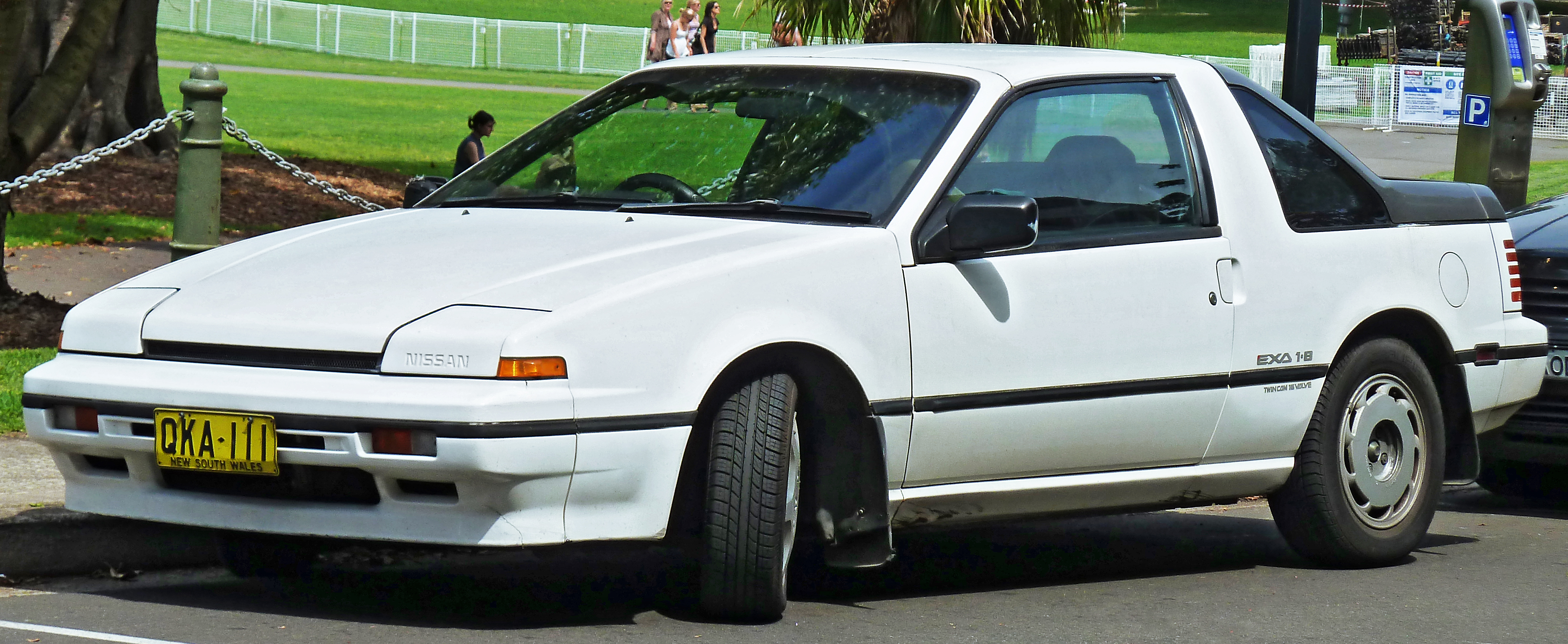
- 1988–1990 Nissan EXA coupe (Australia)

Overview
- Also called: Nissan Pulsar NX
- Production: 1986–1990
- Assembly: Japan
- Designer: Koichiro Kawamura

Body and chassis
- Body style: 3-door T-top coupé
- Layout: Transverse front-engine, front-wheel drive

Powertrain
- Engine: 1597 cc E16i SOHC I4; 1597 cc GA16i SOHC I4; 1598 cc CA16DE DOHC I4; 1809 cc CA18DE DOHC I4
- Transmission: 5-speed manual 4-speed automatic

Dimensions
- Wheelbase: 2,430 mm (95.7 in)
- Length: 4,230 mm (166.5 in)
- Width: 1,680 mm (66.1 in)
- Height: 1,295 mm (51.0 in)
- Curb weight: 1,070 kg (2,359 lb)

Chronology
- Successor: Nissan NX (B14)

Released in 1986, the N13 EXA was marketed in Japan as the Nissan EXA and in North America as the Nissan Pulsar NX. It was offered in only one bodystyle, but could be converted into a coupé, a targa, a cabriolet or a station wagon by removing or replacing panels. It featured a "T-bar removable hatch roof" and could accommodate either of two distinct removable rear hatch designs, a coupé-style hatch door or a station wagon / shooting brake style canopy, marketed as the Sportbak. The EXA / Pulsar NX could also be driven without either rear hatch. The design was conceived largely at the Nissan Design International (now Nissan Design America) studios in San Diego, CA and shared styling cues (prominently, the rear side window angle) with the contemporary two-door Nissan Pathfinder/Terrano (WD21) SUV. The design was done under the direction of NDI President Jerry Hirshberg, Blue Studio Chief Designer Allan Flowers and Doug Wilson. The EXA / Pulsar NX featured the CA16DE engine.

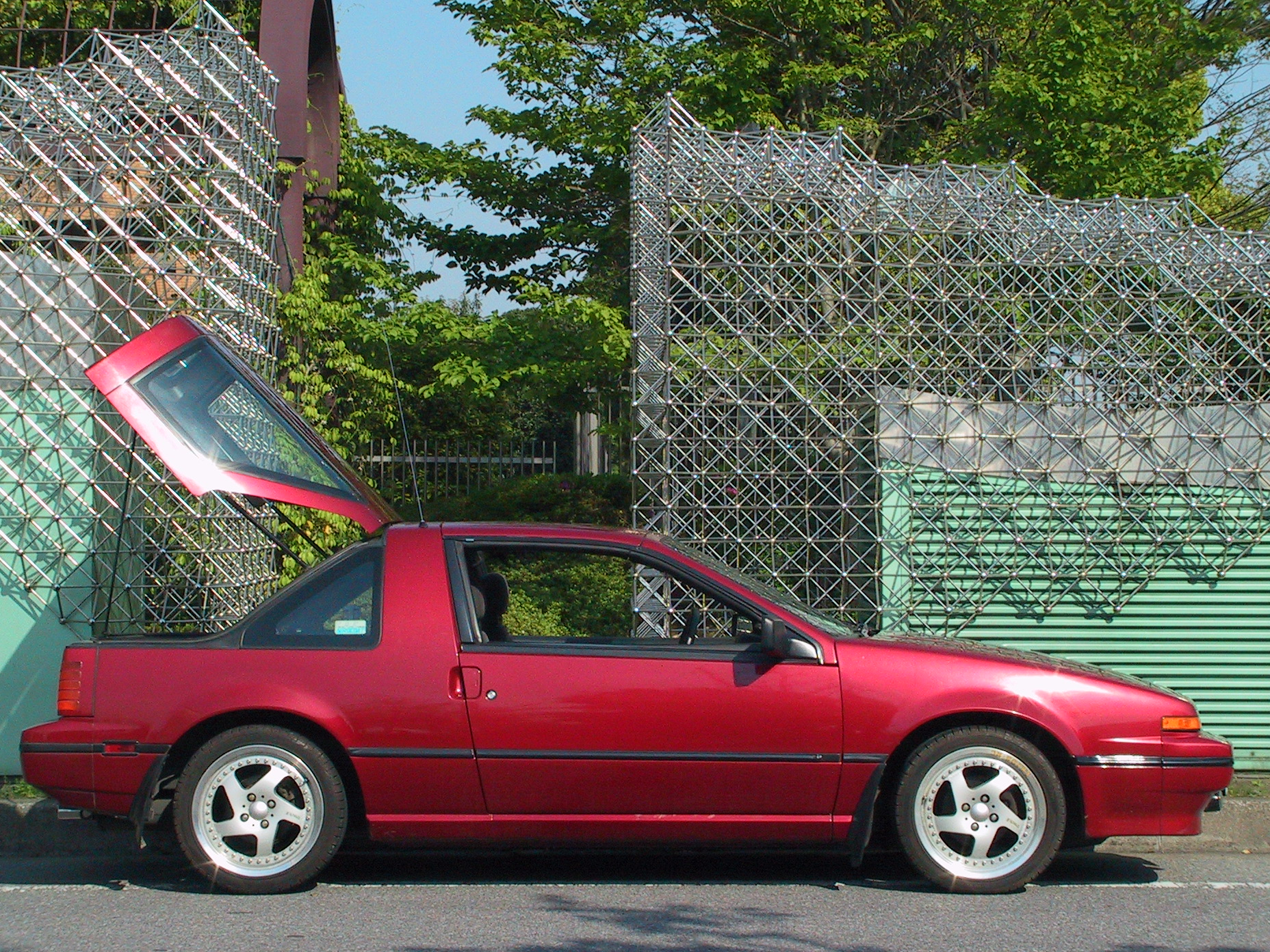
Nissan EXA N13 with Sportbak canopy open

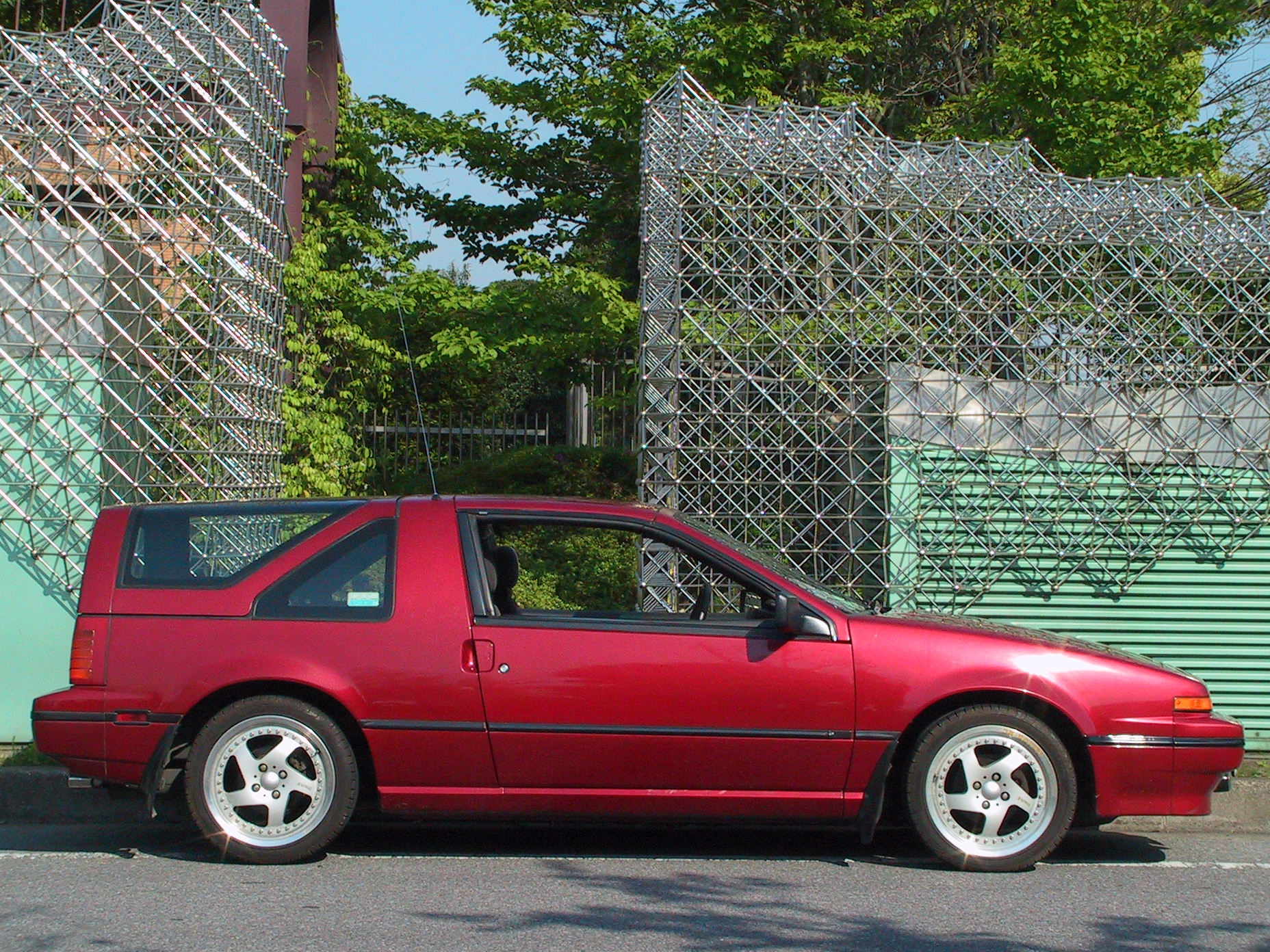
Nissan EXA N13 with Sportbak rear canopy

In Australia, the Series 1 EXA (1986–1987) came with the CA16DE, vinyl rear seats, front vented disk with rear drum brakes, and power steering. The Series 2 EXA (1988–1989) featured the CA18DE and cloth rear seats. There were also two GP versions of the S2 EXA made. 45 white GP edition vehicles were specially made for the celebrity race at the Adelaide Grand Prix in 1988. They had all the features of the Series 2, but also had Pulsar SSS wheels, build numbers on a badge in the dash and a factory roll cage which was removed after the race. The 1989 GP featured all the same features of the Series 2 EXA. They also had the Pulsar SSS wheels, a more aggressive front bumper, and build numbers on a badge in the dash. All 200 of the 1989 GPs made were painted red. The Series 3 (1990–91) EXA added rear disc brakes, improved seats and optional power windows.

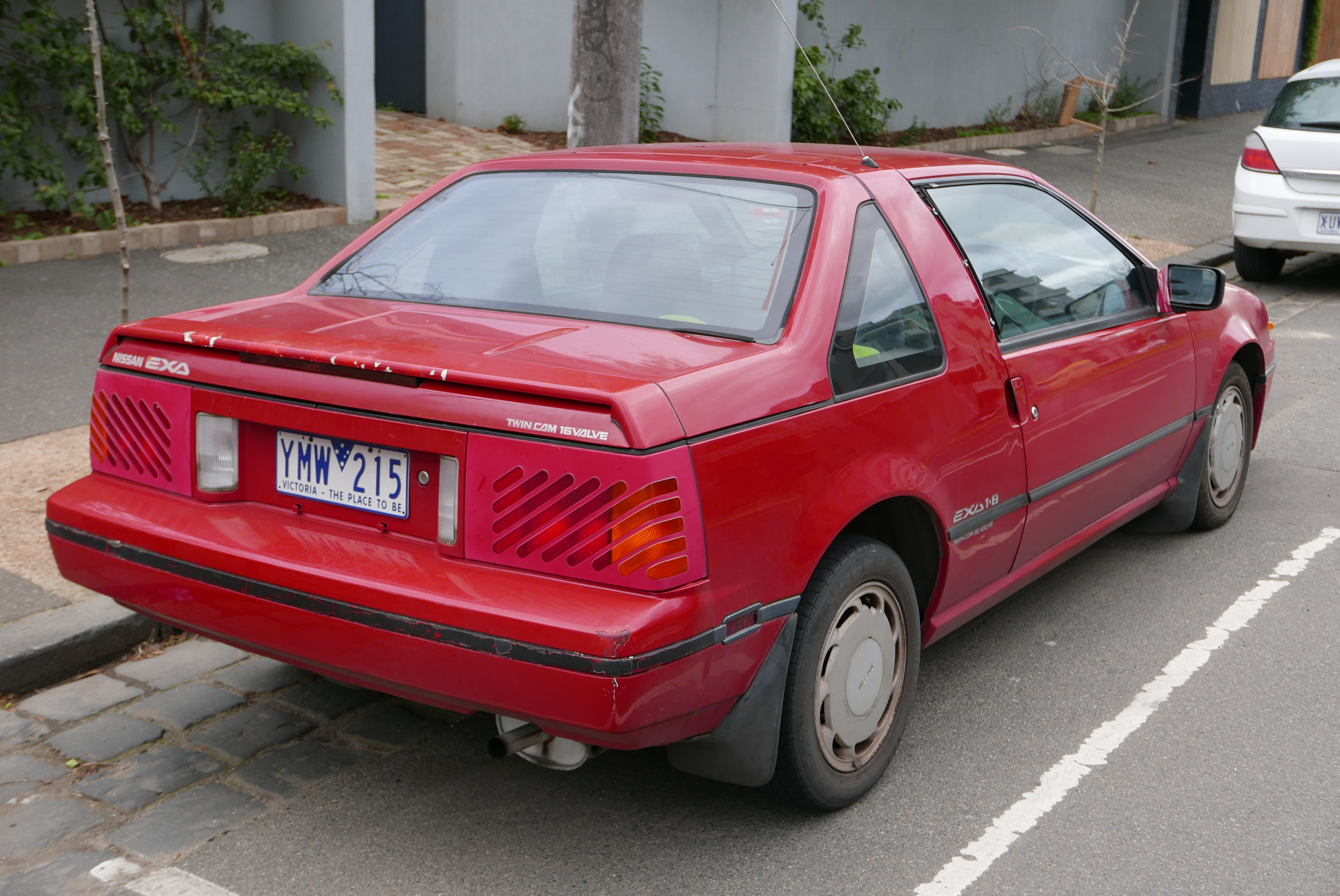
1988–1990 Nissan EXA coupé (Australia)

The North American Pulsar NX was offered in two trim levels: the XE (1.6-liter E16i in 1987–1988 and 1.6-liter GA16i in 1989–1990) and the twin-cam, SE (1.6-liter CA16DE in 1987 and 1.8-liter CA18DE in 1988–1990). The Nissan EXA Solaire was a luxury version of the base model that featured power windows, five-spoke alloy wheels, and a different front bumper. In 1991, Kodak had a competition for five fully optioned Series 3 Nissan EXAs. The Kodak EXAs featured an exclusive pearlescent yellow paint scheme.

The EXA/Pulsar NX was replaced in 1991 with the Nissan NX coupé.

Engines offered in the Pulsar NX:

1987

- 1.6 L E16i, 1,597 cc, single point TBI, SOHC
- 1.6 L CA16DE, 1,598 cc, multi point EFI, DOHC

1988

- 1.6 L E16i, 1,597 cc, single point TBI, SOHC
- 1.8 L CA18DE, 1,809 cc, multi point EFI, DOHC

1989

- 1.6 L GA16i, 1,597 cc, single point TBI, SOHC
- 1.8 L CA18DE, 1,809 cc, multi point EFI, DOHC

1990

- 1.6 L GA16i, 1,597 cc, single point TBI, SOHC
- 1.8 L CA18DE, 1,809 cc, multi point EFI, DOHC
