= Reliant Scimitar SS1 =

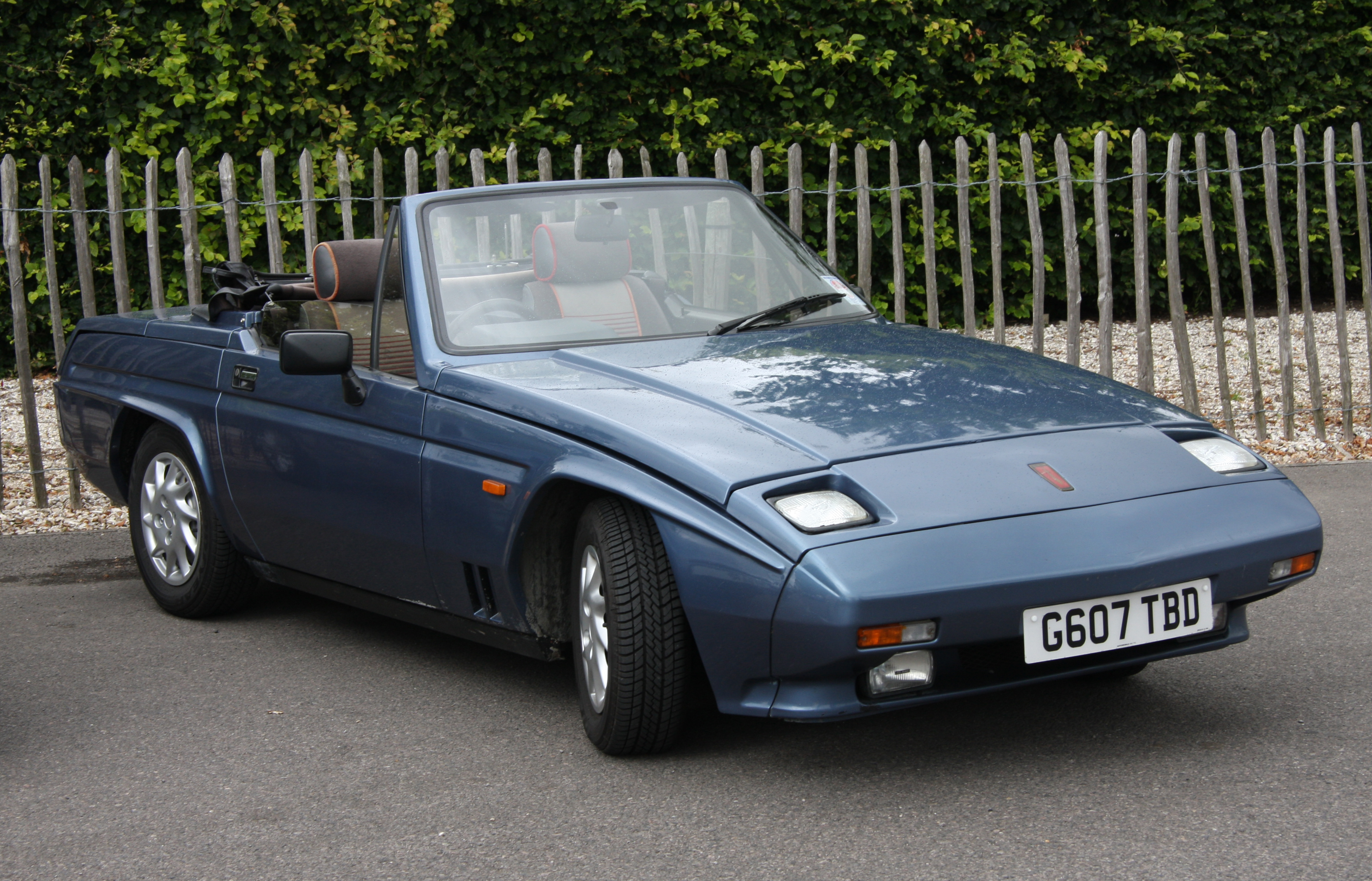

Overview
- Production: 1984–1990
- Assembly: United Kingdom: Tamworth, England
- Designer: Giovanni Michelotti

Powertrain
- Engine: 1296 cc Ford CVH I4; 1392 cc Ford CVH I4; 1597 cc Ford CVH I4; 1.8 L CA18ET turbo I4
- Transmission: 4- or 5-speed manual

Dimensions
- Wheelbase: 2,133 mm (84.0 in)
- Length: 3,886 mm (153.0 in)
- Width: 1,582 mm (62.3 in)
- Height: 1,240 mm (48.8 in)
- Kerb weight: 1,850 lb (839 kg)

Chronology
- Successor: Reliant Scimitar SST

The Reliant Scimitar SS1 is an automobile which was produced by British manufacturer Reliant from 1984 to 1995.

Aiming to fill a gap in the small sports car market, Scimitar SS1 was launched in 1984 at the British International Motor Show in Birmingham. It was Giovanni Michelotti's last design. The name was reported to stand for Small Sports 1. Despite plans for production of 2000 a year, only 1,507 models were produced in the ten years of overall production. In 1990, the SS1 was renamed as the Scimitar SST following a facelift and in 1992 was re-launched as the Scimitar Sabre. Sales of the Sabre ceased in 1995 with the collapse of Reliant.

== Scimitar SS1 (1984–1990) ==
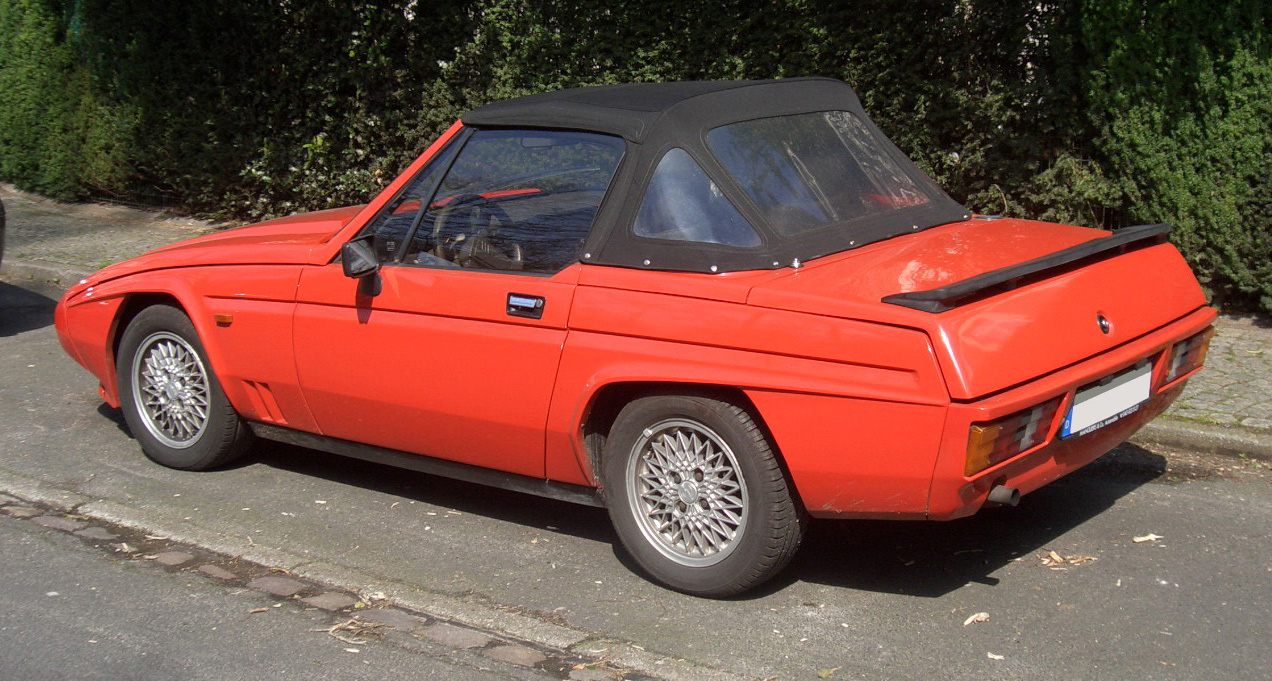
Scimitar SS1 1800Ti

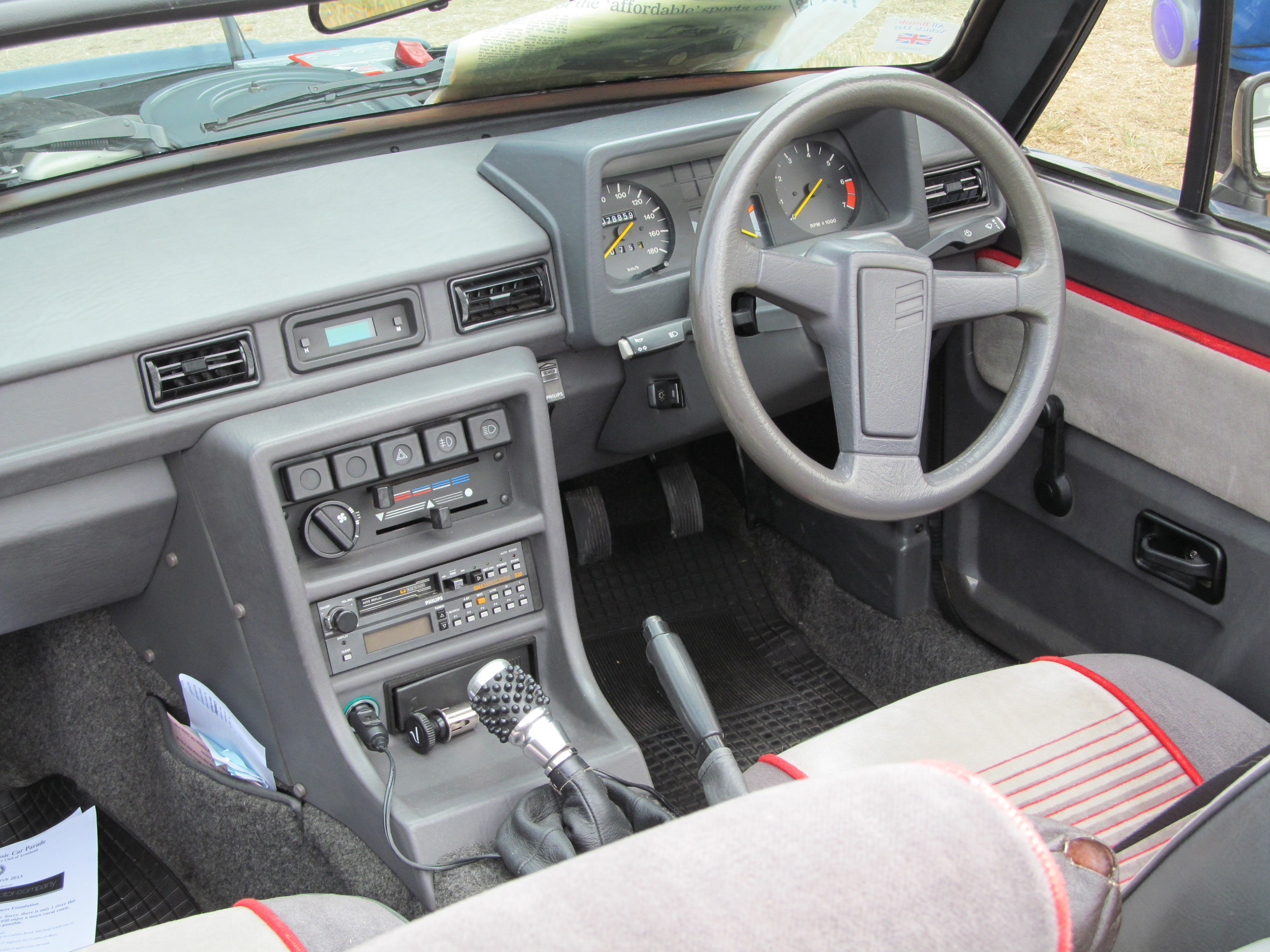
Scimitar SS1 interior

The chassis was inspired by that of the Lotus Elan. The 1.3 L (later replaced with a 1.4 L) and 1.6 L engines were Ford CVH units, front mounted driving the rear wheels through a four-speed gearbox on the 1300 and 1400, and a five-speed gearbox with the 1600. Originally, the car was planned to use the new EFI 1.6 L Ford engine introduced on the Escort XR3i, however, the lower hood line of the SS1 meant that it had to use the slightly shorter carbureted version to fit. The suspension was independent all round using coil springs with semi trailing arms at the rear. The body panels were made of polyurethane or glass reinforced polyester, fitted to a semi-space frame backbone chassis. The panels were designed to be easily removed and replaced to repair accident damage. A removable hard top was available as an option.

The SS1 1.6 L had an engine capacity of 1596 cc with a power output of 96 bhp (72 kW; 97 PS) at 6000 rpm and 98 lb⋅ft (133 N⋅m) at 4000 rpm of torque. It could reach a top speed of 110 mph (177.0 km/h) and accelerated from 0-60 mph in 9.6 seconds. In 1986, the range was joined by the CA18ET 1809 cc turbocharged engine from the Nissan Bluebird. The 1800Ti, as the Nissan-engined version was known, received standard alloy wheels and a small rear spoiler and gave the car a significant performance boost with a power output of 135 bhp (101 kW; 137 PS) at 6000 rpm and 143 lb⋅ft (194 N⋅m) of torque. This allowed for a top speed of 126 mph (202.8 km/h) and 0-60 mph in 6.8 seconds.

This car had unusual uncovered rectangular Porsche 928-style pop-up headlamps and shared many components with production cars of the day, such as Austin-Rover switchgear and gauges. The post 1986 models with a galvanised chassis can be identified by having a single windscreen wiper.

== Scimitar SS2 concept (1988) ==
The Scimitar SS2 concept car was based on the SS1 1800ti, restyled by William Towns. Intended for the United States market and powered by a V8 engine, it was commissioned by General Motors, but planned production of the car was dropped when GM funding was withdrawn.

== Scimitar SST (1990–1992) ==
Reliant Scimitar SST
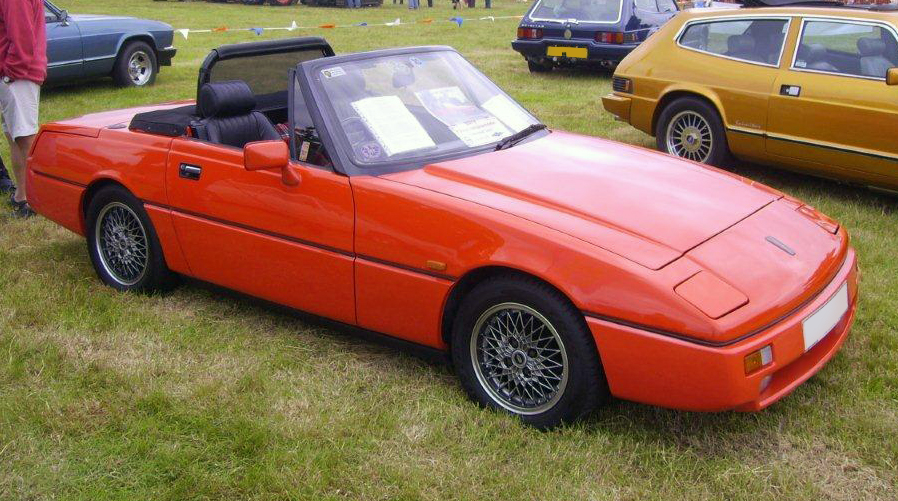

Overview
- Production: 1990–1992
- Assembly: United Kingdom: Tamworth, England

Powertrain
- Engine: Nissan CA18ET Ford CVH

Chronology
- Successor: Reliant Scimitar Sabre

Some of the styling features of the SS2 prototype were incorporated into a facelifted SS1 model, renamed Scimitar SST ("T" for "Towns"). The SST was launched in 1990. More than a mere facelift, the new body was also of a very different construction. The SS1's bodypanels were mounted on a steel framework, itself mounted to the chassis, while the SST's body was of a "semi-monocoque" design fixed directly to the chassis. The bodywork, consisting of two large pieces (front and rear), thus did not suffer the unsightly panel gaps that were so characteristic of the SS1.

The engines were Nissan's CA18ET (1800Ti) producing 135 bhp (101 kW; 137 PS) and Ford's CVH (1400) producing 75 bhp (56 kW; 76 PS). The only transmission available was a five-speed manual unit.

== Scimitar Sabre (1992–1995) ==
Reliant Scimitar Sabre
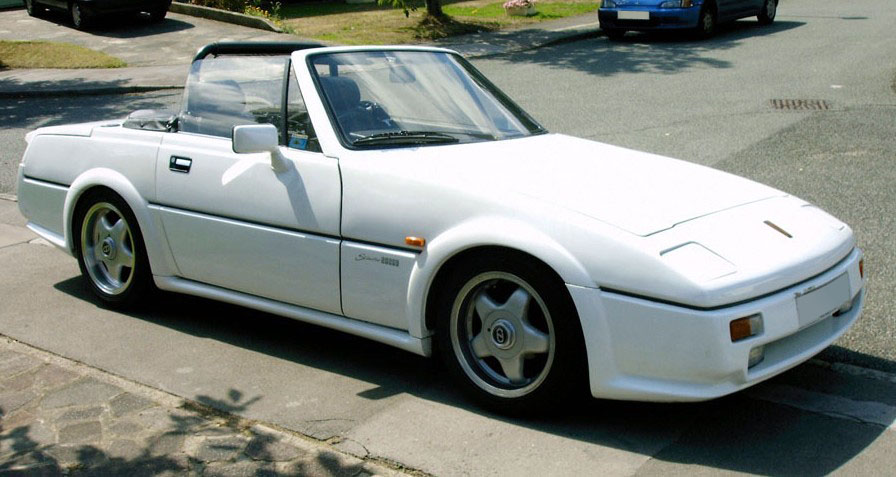

Overview
- Production: 1992–1995
- Assembly: United Kingdom: Tamworth, England
- Designer: William Towns

Powertrain
- Engine: 1.4 L Ford I4; 1.4 L Rover K I4; 1.8 L CA18ET turbo I4
- Transmission: 5 speed manual

Dimensions
- Wheelbase: 2,133 mm (84.0 in)
- Length: 3,886 mm (153.0 in)
- Width: 1,582 mm (62.3 in)
- Height: 1,240 mm (48.8 in)
- Kerb weight: 1,850 lb (839 kg)

The Scimitar Sabre was the last Scimitar model to be produced, re-using the name from the 1960s Reliant Sabre.

Based on the chassis of the SS1 and SST, it was announced in October 1991 and launched in 1992 with the same 1.4 Ford engine and 1.8 Nissan engines as before. A restyle followed in 1993 with the introduction of the new Rover K-series 1.4 L engine, with a top speed of 113 mph (181.9 km/h) and acceleration from 0-60 mph (97 km/h) in 9.4 seconds. The Sabre was visually different with larger 15 inch wheels and flared wheel arches.
