= Nissan CA engine =

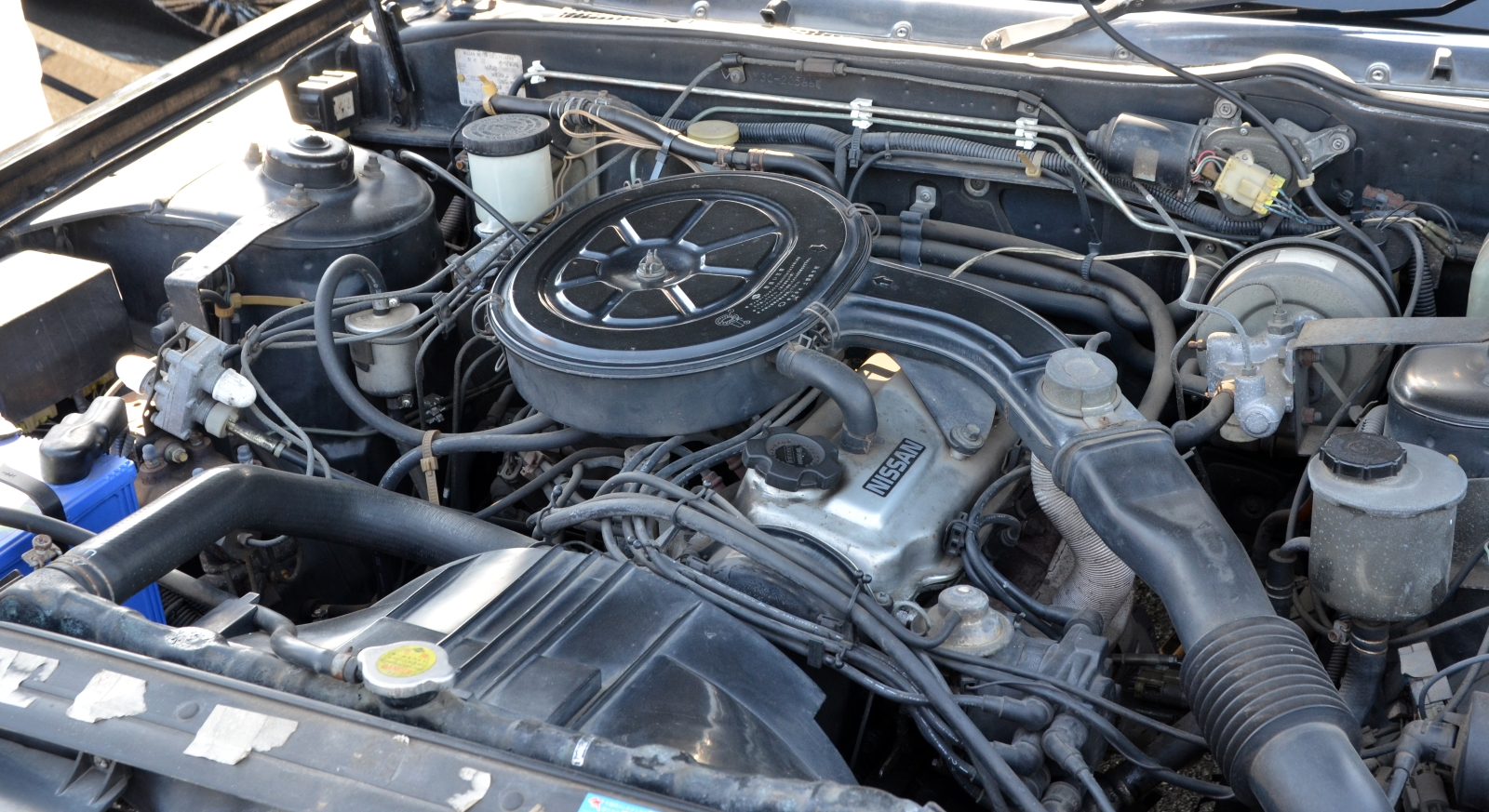
- Nissan CA20S engine

Overview
- Manufacturer: Nissan (Nissan Machinery)
- Production: 1982-1994

Layout
- Configuration: Inline-4
- Displacement: 1.6 L (1,598 cc); 1.8 L (1,809 cc); 2.0 L (1,974 cc)
- Cylinder bore: 78 mm (3.07 in); 83 mm (3.27 in); 84.5 mm (3.33 in)
- Piston stroke: 83.6 mm (3.29 in); 88 mm (3.46 in)
- Cylinder block material: Cast iron
- Cylinder head material: Aluminum
- Valvetrain: SOHC 2 valves x cyl. DOHC 4 valves x cyl.

Combustion
- Turbocharger: Single Garrett T2 or T25 (CA18ET, CA18DET)
- Fuel system: Carburetor (CA16S, CA18S, CA20S); Throttle-body fuel injection (CA18i); Multi-port fuel injection (CA16DE, CA18DE, CA18ET, CA18DET, CA20E)
- Fuel type: Gasoline
- Cooling system: Water-cooled

Output
- Power output: 81–166 PS (60–122 kW; 80–164 hp)
- Torque output: 123–228 N⋅m (91–168 lb⋅ft)

Chronology
- Predecessor: Nissan L engine & Nissan Z engine
- Successor: Nissan SR engine (all except CA16); Nissan GA engine (CA16)

The CA engine is a series of 1.6 to 2.0 L (1,598 to 1,974 cc) Inline-4 piston engines from Nissan. It is designed for a wide variety of smaller Nissan vehicles to replace the Z engine and some smaller, four-cylinder L series engines. The "CA" stands for Clean Air, due to the installation of Nissan emission reducing technology, called NAPS-X.

The CA is a cast iron block, aluminum head design with a timing belt, which was cheaper to make than the timing chain setup on the Z and L engines. Earlier versions featured SOHC and eight valves. The new CA block design was a scaled-up E series block with timing shaft and other ancillaries removed. The oil pump is fitted directly onto the crank nose and the distributor is driven by the end of the camshaft. Like the E series and the A block from which the E was derived, Nissan used a taller block for the largest stroked 2.0-litre engine. The CA was designed to be compact and light, with a CA16 requiring only 195 litres (52 US gal; 43 imp gal) of space (compared to 280 litres (74 US gal; 62 imp gal) for the earlier Z16), while weighing 23% less at 115 kg (254 lb).

Later versions featured DOHC with 16 valves for increased efficiency at high engine speeds and a smoother power delivery. The hydraulic lifters are interchangeable between all DOHC RB and VG series engines excepting those with solid lifters. The Nissan CA would also be developed into a diesel engine, known as the CD, which replaced the four-cylinder LD series.

The engine was deemed too expensive to produce due to its cast-iron block, and over the years it also no longer met the ever-changing Japanese emission standards that were emerging at the time. The 1.8 L and 2.0 L versions were replaced by the all-aluminum and chain-driven SR series as Nissan's primary four-cylinder engine while the smaller 1.6 L version was replaced by the GA series, both in 1987. Engines for the low volume European markets, such as the 200SX, were supplied by the overstock between Japanese and Australian markets. Production of the CA series ceased in 1994.

== CA16 ==
The CA16 series of engines is a 1.6 L (1,598 cc) engine produced from 1985 through 1990. Bore and stroke is 78 mm × 83.6 mm (3.07 in × 3.29 in) and it was built either with carburetors or fuel injection.

=== CA16S ===
The CA16S is a 1.6 L (1,598 cc) water cooling serial 4-cylinder OHC engine. It produces 81 PS (60 kW; 80 hp) at 5200 rpm and 123 N⋅m (91 lb⋅ft) at 3200 rpm.

Applications:

- 1989 Nissan Bluebird U11 - 90 PS (66 kW; 89 hp), 13.6 kg⋅m (133 N⋅m; 98 lb⋅ft)
- 1985-1990 Nissan Bluebird T12/T72
- 1986-1990 Nissan Auster T12 "1.6Vc", "1.6Mc"
- 1986-1990 JDM Nissan Stanza T12 "Supreme 1.6"
- Yue Loong Feeling 101, 102. 88 PS (65 kW; 87 hp), double-barrel carburetor

=== CA16DE ===
The CA16DE is a 1.6 L (1,598 cc) engine produced from 1987 through 1989. It produces 122 hp (91 kW; 124 PS) at 6400 rpm and 137 N⋅m (101 lb⋅ft) at 5200 rpm. Bore and stroke is 78 mm × 83.6 mm (3.07 in × 3.29 in). It was a 16-valve DOHC engine with multi-port fuel injection, for front wheel drive use. North American versions used Nissan's NICS (Nissan Induction Control System), which opened up the secondary intake ports to each cylinder via a butterfly valve in each port. Activated at 3,900 rpm, this improved flow and performance resultingly. Additionally, on activation of the secondaries under a heavy load the fuel injection also went from sequential mode to simultaneous-pulse mode. These features were also found on North American CA18DE engines.

Applications:

- Nissan Pulsar NX SE (United States and Canada)
- Nissan EXA (Australia and Japan)
- Nissan Sunny B12
- Nissan Sunny N13 (Europe)
- Nissan Pulsar N13 Twincam

== CA18 ==
=== CA18S ===
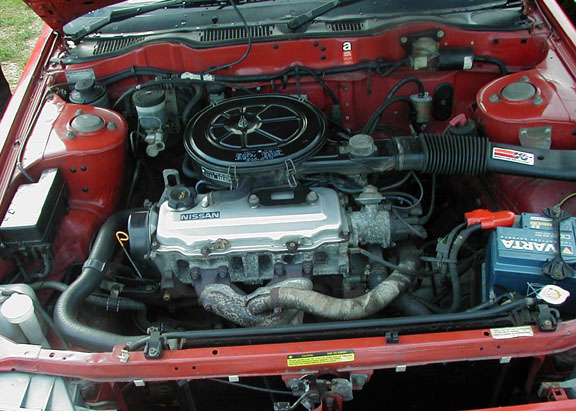
CA18S engine

The 1.8 L (1,809 cc) CA18(s) was a carbureted version of the CA engine available in Japan. It produces 66 kW (89 hp; 90 PS) and 149 N⋅m (110 lb⋅ft). Bore and stroke is 83 mm × 83.6 mm (3.27 in × 3.29 in).

It was used in the following vehicles:

- 1984 Nissan Laurel (C32)
- 1984 Nissan Skyline (R30)
- 1985-1987 Nissan Skyline (R31)
- 1988 Nissan Stanza (T12)
- 1987-1988 Nissan Auster (T12)
- 1985-1990 Nissan Bluebird (U11)
- 1988-199? Nissan Bluebird (U12; export only)
- 1985-1988 Nissan Prairie (M10)

=== CA18(i) ===
The CA18(i) is a naturally aspirated engine it delivers 91 hp (68 kW; 92 PS) at 5200 rpm. The fuel in this engine is not delivered via Multi Port Fuel Injection (E letter code on MPFI engines), it's instead delivered by Throttle Body Fuel Injection hence the (i) letter on the engine code. Bore and stroke is 83 mm × 83.6 mm (3.27 in × 3.29 in), for a total displacement of 1,809 cc (1.8 L).

Applications:

- Nissan Skyline R31, R32 GXi (100 hp (75 kW; 101 PS))
- Nissan Laurel C33
- Nissan Auster T12 series, "1.8Vi", 1.8Mi", 1.8Xi"
- Nissan Bluebird RNU12
- Yue Loong Feeling 101, 102, Arex With minor changes to lower engine displacement from original 1,809 to 1,796 cc (1.8 to 1.8 L) by decreasing bore down to 82.7 mm (3.26 in). CA18 for Arex was delivered with Lucas multi port Fuel Injection.

=== CA18E ===
The CA18E is a naturally aspirated, 1.8 L (1,809 cc), single-cam engine. It uses Multi Point Fuel Injection.

Applications:

- Nissan Bluebird 1.8 SSS-E (U11) - 115 PS (85 kW; 113 hp) at 5600 rpm, 16.5 kg⋅m (162 N⋅m; 119 lb⋅ft) at 2800 rpm
- 1983.08-1985.08 Nissan Skyline 1.8 TI (R30)

=== CA18DE ===
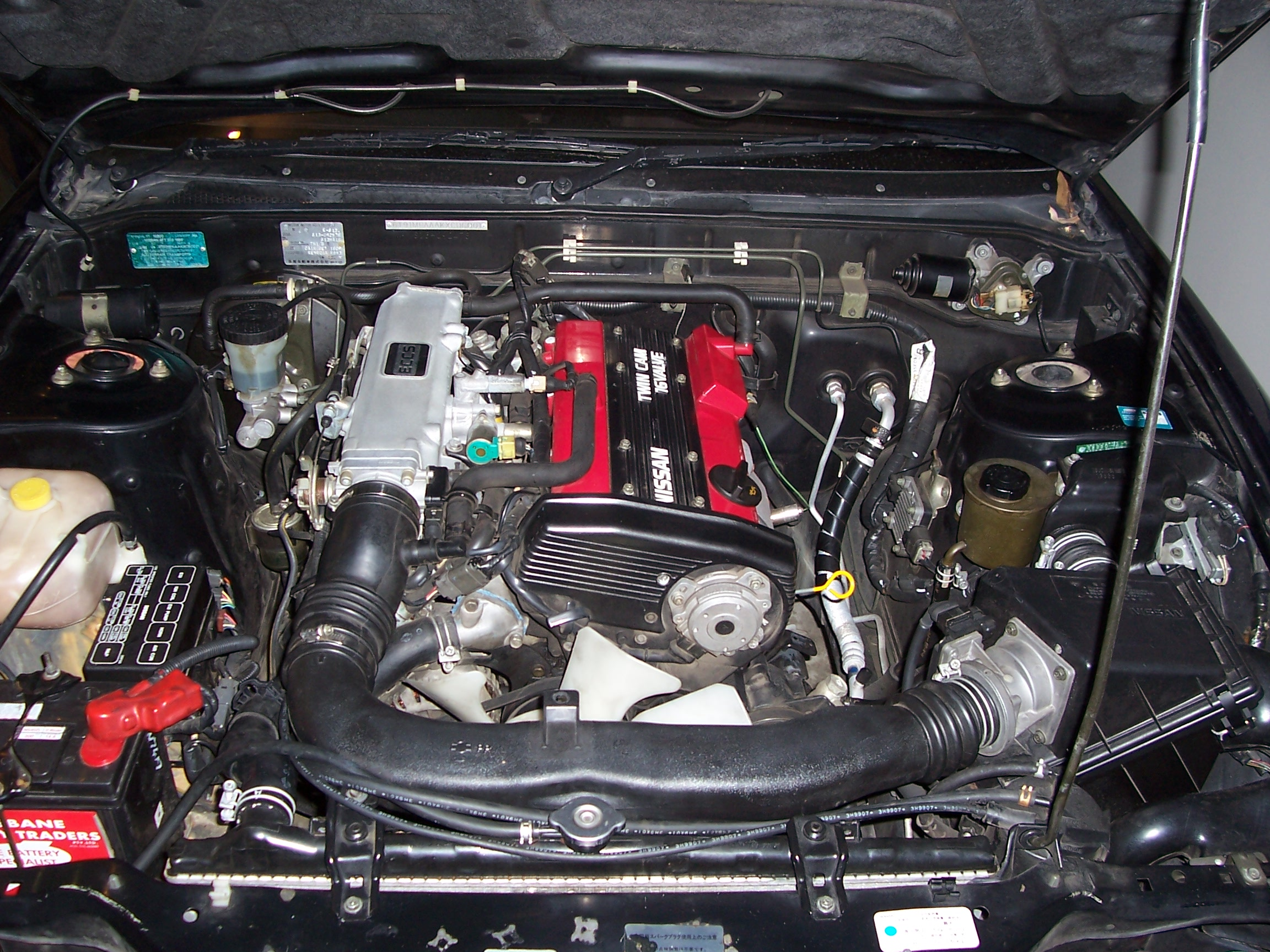
CA18DE engine

The CA18DE is a 1.8 L (1,809 cc) DOHC engine produced from 1985 through January 1991. It produces 131 hp (98 kW; 133 PS) at 6400 rpm and 159 N⋅m (117 lb⋅ft) at 5200 rpm. It uses the same aluminum 16-valve head as the CA18DET, but it did not use the piston oil squirters that are found on the CA18DET. A crank girdle as found on all CA18DETs is fitted into some versions of the engine in some markets; Nissan's parts data system "FAST" has to be consulted or the sump removed to determine if it can be fitted.

It was used in the following vehicles:

- Transversal (FWD/AWD):
  - Nissan Pulsar NX SE (United States and Canada)
  - Nissan EXA (Australia & Japan)
  - Mid 1980s Nissan Sunny N13 (UK) 129 hp (96 kW; 131 PS) (no girdle)
  - Mid 1980s Nissan Sunny B12 Coupe (UK) 129 hp (96 kW; 131 PS) (has girdle)
  - Late 1980s Nissan Bluebird T72 (UK) 129 hp (96 kW; 131 PS)
  - Nissan Bluebird (Sept'87 - Oct'89) RNU12 (FWD & AWD)
  - 1985-1990 Nissan Auster "1.8Xt TwinCam" (has girdle)
  - 1988-1991 KN13 Nissan EXA (Australian market)
- Longitudinal (RWD):
  - 1985-1991 Nissan Skyline HR31 1800I (Japan)
  - 1989-1990 Nissan Silvia/180SX P/S13

=== CA18ET ===
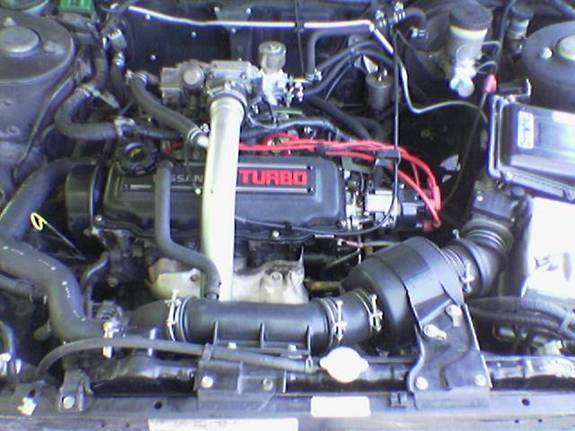
CA18ET engine

The 1.8 L (1,809 cc) CA18ET was produced from 1984 through 1992. It is a turbocharged version of the CA18E, which produces 99 kW (135 PS; 133 hp) and 183 N⋅m (135 lb⋅ft) from a single Garrett T2 turbocharger which did not feature an intercooler. The low-pressure turbo has a 0.6 bars (8.7 psi) overcharge. The engine has fuel and air delivered via ECCS Multiport Fuel Injection, a system developed together with Hitachi.

It was used in the following vehicles:

- 1984-1986 Nissan 200SX Turbo (US) (until 1988 in Canada)
- 1984-1986 Nissan Bluebird U11 Turbo (Europe)
- 1983-1985 Nissan Bluebird U11 SSS-X (Japanese Market) - 135 PS (99 kW; 133 hp) at 6000 rpm, 20 kg⋅m (196 N⋅m; 145 lb⋅ft) at 3600 rpm
- 1986-1988 Nissan Silvia (Japanese Market)
- 1986-1990 Nissan Bluebird T12/T72 Turbo (Europe)
- 1985-1990 Nissan Auster 1.8Xt
- Mid 1980s Nissan Silvia S12 (Europe)
- 1985-1993 Nissan Vanette C22 / Vanette Largo GC22 Model (2nd Gen), Japan
- 1986-1990 Reliant Scimitar SS1 1800Ti
- 1990-1992 Reliant Scimitar SST 1800Ti
- 1992-1995 Reliant Scimitar Sabre 1800Ti

=== CA18DET ===
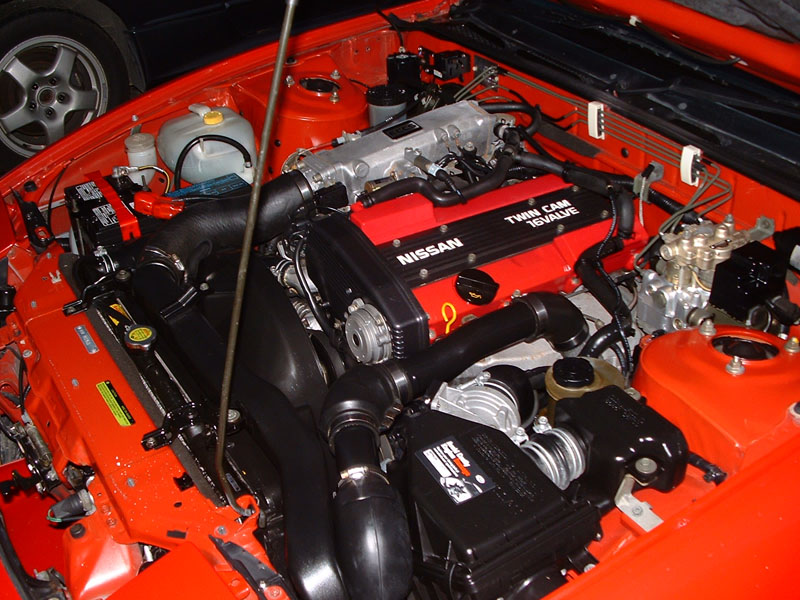
CA18DET engine

The 1.8 L (1,809 cc) CA18DET was the last version of the CA engine to be released, manufactured from 1985 to 1994. It is a turbocharged version of the CA18DE, producing 124 kW (169 PS; 166 hp) and 228 N⋅m (168 lb⋅ft). It has a brand new DOHC aluminum head with 16 valves. The turbocharger was also upgraded to a Garrett T25 (.48 A/R) unit for increased flow capacity, and as such, was fitted with an intercooler to help prevent the onset of pre-ignition and/or detonation. Fuel was delivered via Multiport Fuel Injection. Bore and stroke is 83 mm × 83.6 mm (3.27 in × 3.29 in). An electronically controlled fuel injection system was used with 370 cc (23 cu in) (flow capacity) injectors.

There were 2 versions of the CA18DET available, yet only one was produced for Japan. The late model Japanese CA18DETs received 8 port (low port) heads, with butterfly actuated auxiliary ports in the lower intake manifold which corresponded with 8 ports in the head.

Below c. 3,800 rpm, only one set (4 ports open, 1 per cylinder) of long, narrow ports would be open, accelerating the intake charge to the cylinder. This allowed for quick spool and good low-end tractability. At the 3800 rpm change over, not only would the ECCS shift into batch fire (as opposed to sequential) fuel injection, but it also opened the second set of short, wide ports (8 ports open, 2 per cylinder) which assisted in high RPM flow.

This engine is known for stronger torque characteristics, as well as faster spool at lower RPMs. However, due to displacement-based taxation and cost of emissions testing in Europe, the CA18DET was sold as the only available engine in the S13 chassis 200SX (Euro model) until replaced by the S14 in 1994. The Euro motors received the 4 port (high port) head and intake manifold, as well as revised ECCS ("Electronic Concentrated Control System") parameters.

It was used in the following vehicles:

- Transversal (FWD/AWD):
  - 1985-1990 Nissan Auster "1.8Xtt" and "Euroform Twincam Turbo"
  - 1987-1989 Nissan Bluebird RNU12 SSS ATTESA Limited (Japanese Market)
- Longitudinal (RWD):
  - 1987-1988 Silvia S12 RS-X
  - 1987-1989 Silvia S12 Grand Prix final edition in Europe
  - 1988-mid 1990 Nissan Silvia/180SX S13 (Japanese market)
  - 1989-1994 Nissan 200SX RS13-U Europe.

== CA20 ==
The CA20 is a series of SOHC 2.0 L (1,974 cc) engine produced from 1982 through 1991 (possibly longer for the CA20P). Bore and stroke is 84.5 mm × 88 mm (3.33 in × 3.46 in).

=== CA20P ===
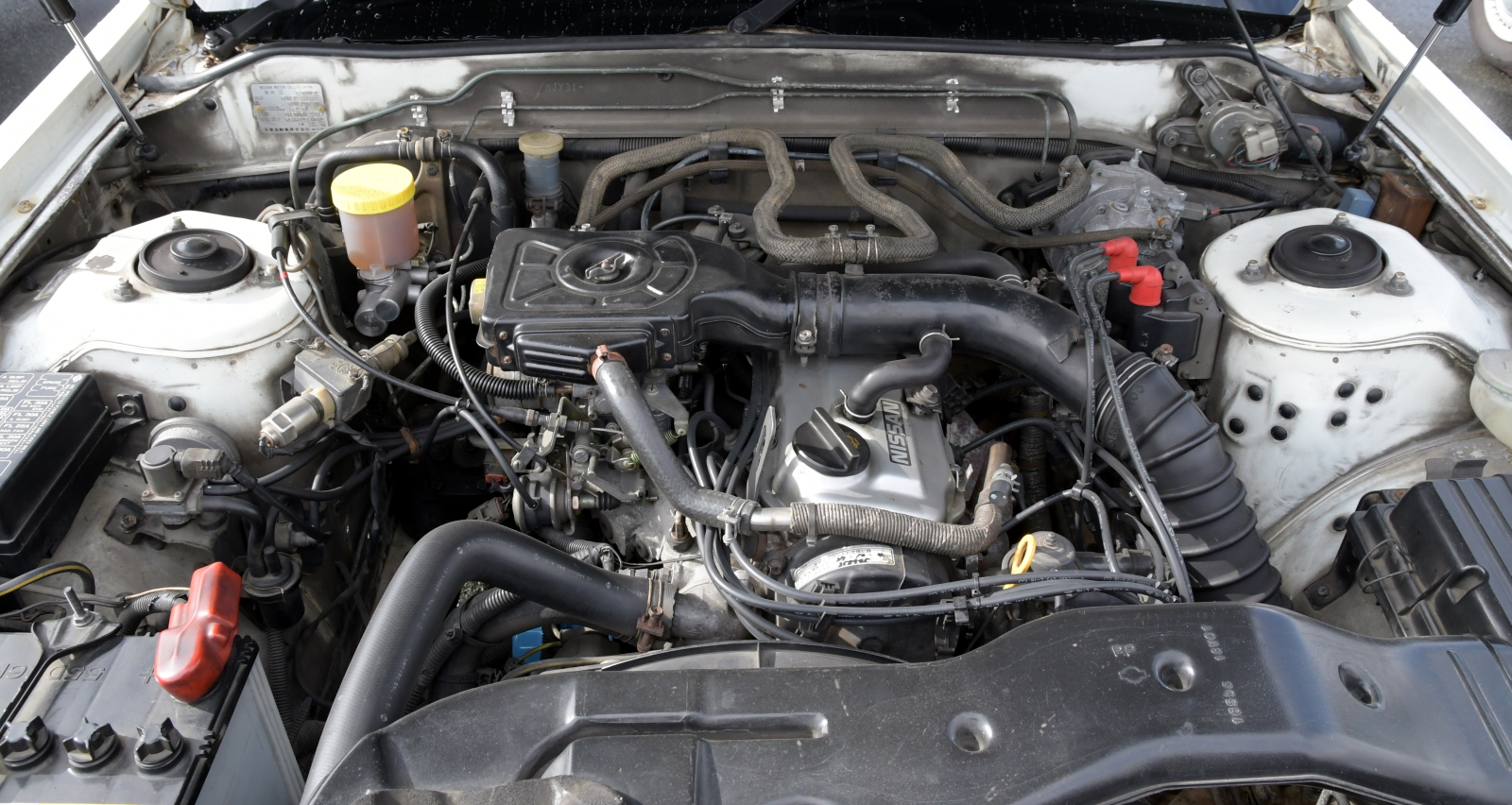
The LPG-powered CA20P engine

The CA20P is a carbureted, single overhead cam designed to run on LPG. It came in two claimed different power outputs, initially 90 PS (66 kW; 89 hp) JIS gross at 5,600 rpm and later 82 PS (60 kW; 81 hp) JIS net at 4,800 rpm. The respective torque figures are 15.5 kg⋅m (152 N⋅m; 112 lb⋅ft) at 2,800 rpm and 15.2 kg⋅m (149 N⋅m; 110 lb⋅ft) at 2,000 rpm. This engine was usually installed in professional cars and was not regularly available to private buyers. It was replaced by the NA20P engine in mid-1991.

Applications:

- Nissan Cedric NJY30 (1983.06-1987.06)
- Nissan Cedric NJY31 (1987.06-1991.06)
- Nissan Gloria NJY30 (1983.06-1987.06)
- Nissan Gloria NJY31 (1987.06-1991.06)

=== CA20S ===
The CA20S is an SOHC 2.0 L (1,974 cc) engine produced from 1982 through 1987, fed by a carburetor. It typically produces a peak power of 102 PS (75 kW; 101 hp) at 5,200 rpm and has a peak torque rating of 160 N⋅m (118 lb⋅ft) at 3,600 rpm.

Applications:

- Nissan Stanza
- Nissan Prairie M11/M12 Europe
- Nissan Auster
- Nissan Bluebird Series 3 1985-1986 (Australia)
- Nissan Bluebird U11 Estate 1985-1990 (Europe)
- Nissan Bluebird T12 1985-1988 (Europe)
- Nissan Laurel (C32) 1984-1990 (no twin spark)
- Nissan Skyline GL and GLE (R31) (106 hp (79 kW; 107 PS))
- 1983–1987 Nissan Cedric/Gloria Y30 (110 PS (81 kW; 108 hp) at 5,600 rpm)
- Nissan Vanette C22 / Vanette Largo GC22 Model, Japan

=== CA20E ===
The SOHC 2.0 L (1,974 cc) CA20E was produced from August 1981 to 1991. It produces 78 kW (106 PS; 105 hp) and 160 N⋅m (118 lb⋅ft). Fuel was delivered via Multiport Fuel Injection. Dual spark plugs per cylinder were used in some variants of this engine for enhanced combustion efficiency, called NAPS-X.

It was used in the following vehicles:

- 1984-1988 Nissan 200SX (US & Canada) / Nissan Gazelle (Australia)
- 1986-1992 Nissan Pintara R31/U12 (Australia)
- 1984-1990 Nissan Stanza
- 1982-1988 Stanza Wagon (US)/ Multi (Canada) M10
- 1987-1989 Nissan Bluebird / Bluebird ATTESA U12 (and was replaced by the SR20DE in the Series 2 U12 Bluebirds)
- 1988-1990 Nissan Bluebird T72
- 1986-1991 Nissan Pintara

=== CA20DE/CA20DET/CA20ET ===
There was never a factory-produced twin-cam 2.0 L CA engine, nor there was a turbo version. However, the blocks are similar, and it is possible to fit the DOHC CA18DE/CA18DET twin-cam head into the SOHC CA20 block. However, the DOHC/SOHC manifolds are different and the timing pulley/belts are not compatible. Despite this, however, several examples of a CA20DET engine have been built.

== Stroker kits ==
Tomei and JUN of Japan produced 2–litre stroker kits for the CA18. Also companies like Norris Designs and Spool Imports produces CA20 stroker kits as well as a CA20 engine.

== See also ==
- List of Nissan engines
