= NMPI =

NMPI may refer to:

- National Medicaid Pooling Initiative, a prescription drug purchasing pool in the US
- Nissan Motor Philippines, Inc., an automobile manufacturer
- Non-mainstream pooled investment vehicle, a form of investment fund in the UK
