= Datsun truck =

Compact pickup truck made by Nissan

Datsun Truck
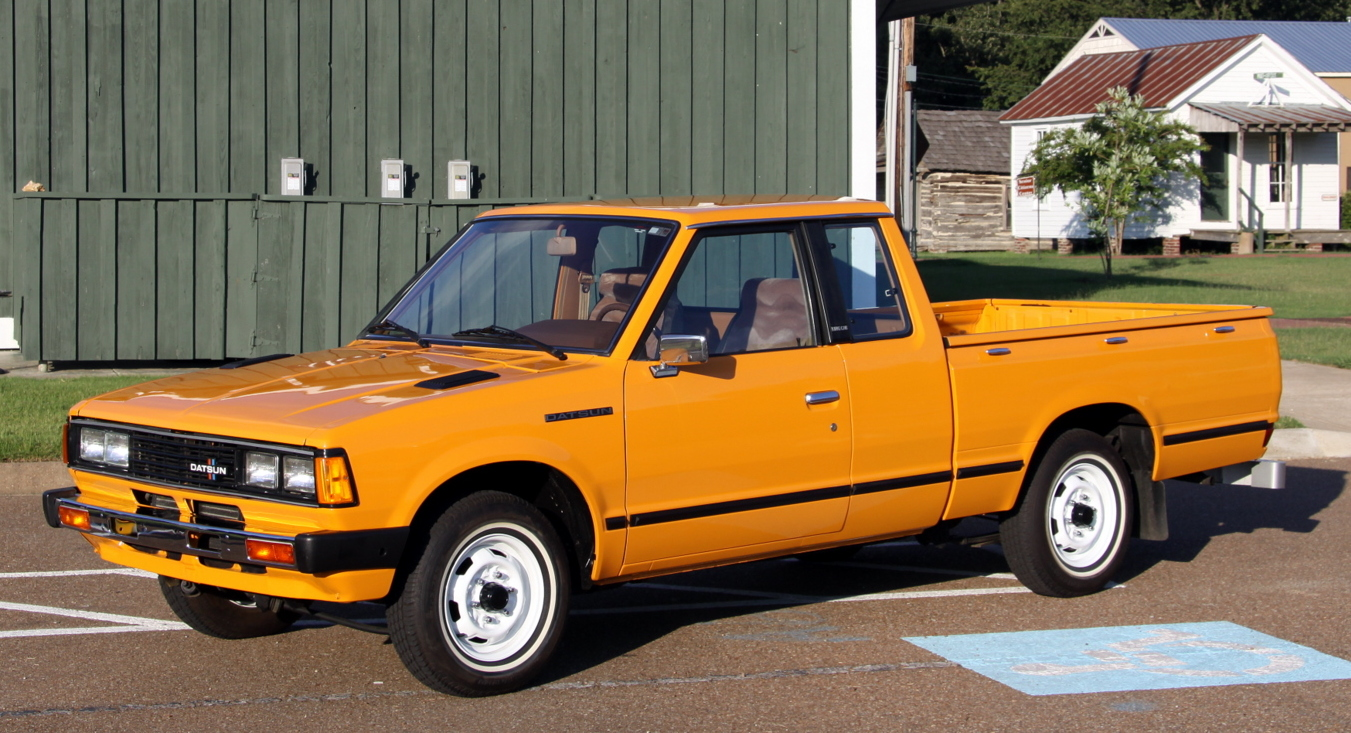

Overview
- Manufacturer: Nissan (Nissan Shatai)
- Production: 1955–1997; (predecessors since 1934)

Body and chassis
- Class: compact pickup truck
- Layout: FR layout

Chronology
- Predecessor: Datsun 6147
- Successor: Nissan Navara

The Datsun Truck is a compact pickup truck made by Nissan in Japan from 1955 to 1997. It was originally sold under the Datsun brand, but this was switched to Nissan in 1983. It was replaced in 1997 by the Frontier and Navara. In Japan, it was sold only in Nissan Bluebird Store locations.

== Predecessors ==
=== Pre-war ===
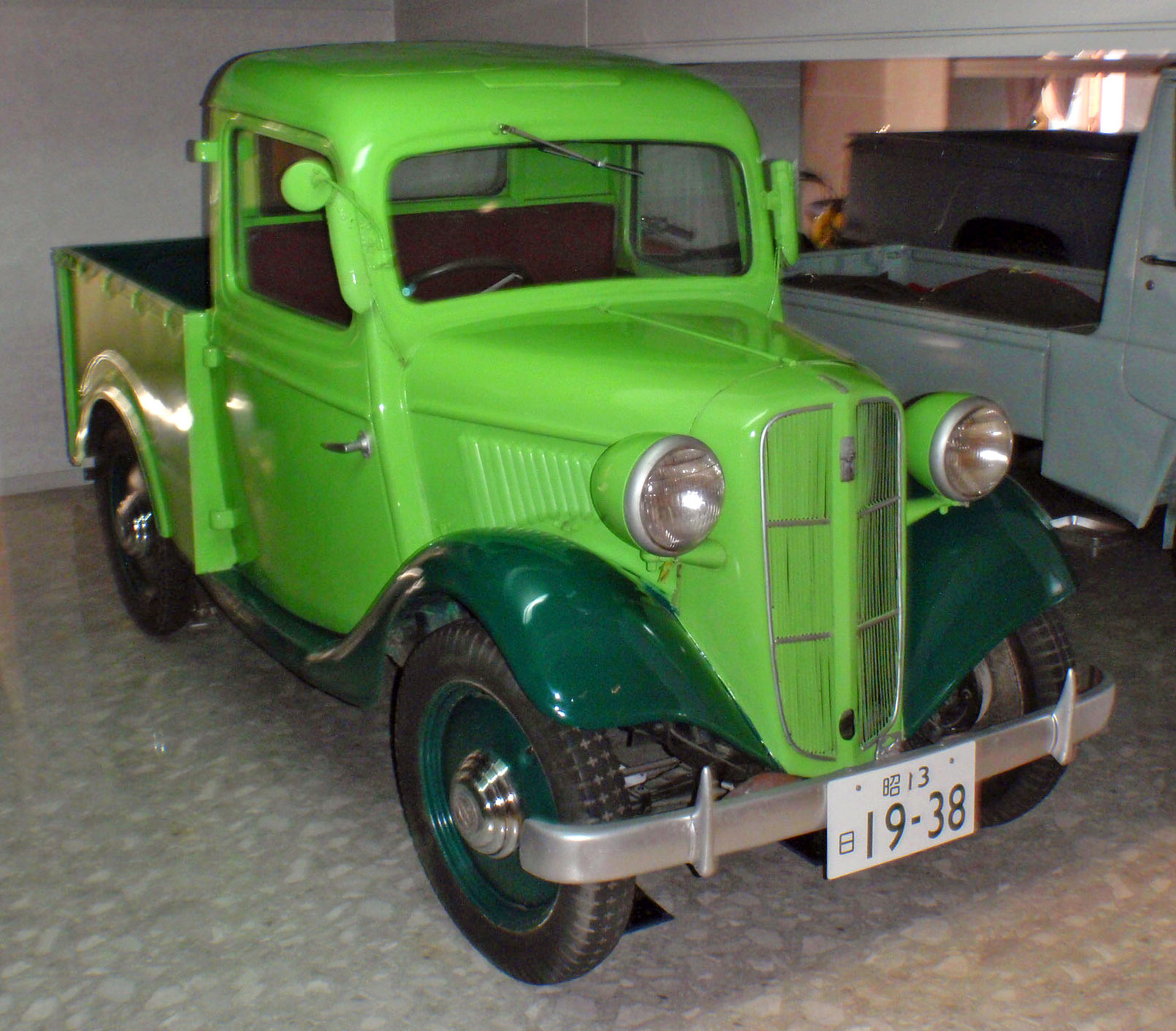
1938 Datsun 17T truck

The Datsun Truck line began with the Type 13 in April 1934, and was later used as the basis of the Datsun DC-3 Roadster. A series of small trucks based on their passenger car counterparts, the 14T, 15T, and 17T, continued to be built until early 1944.

=== Post-war ===
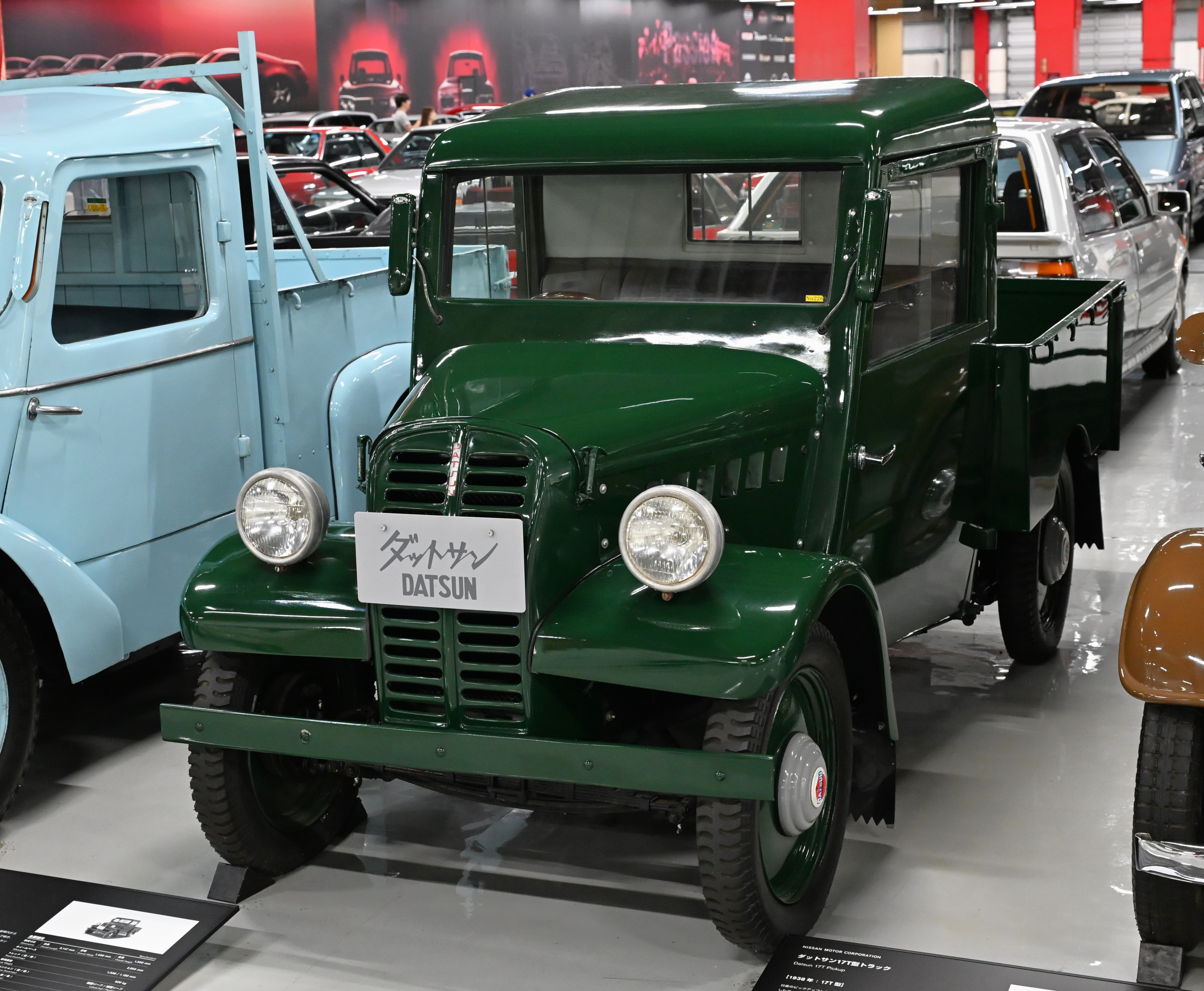
1947 Datsun 2225 Truck

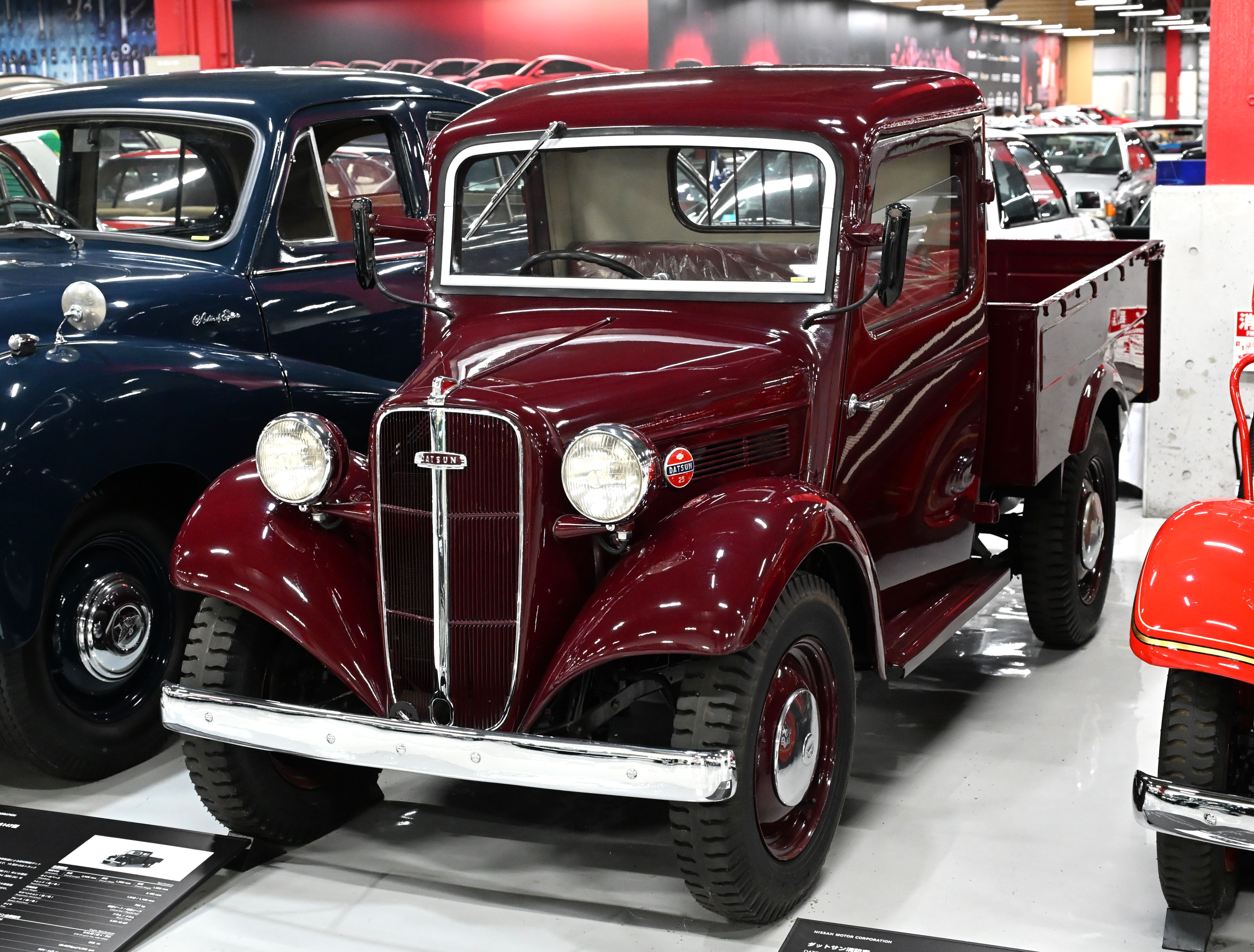
1953 Datsun 6147 Truck

The 17T was followed by the post-war Datsun 1121 in 1946, which was nearly identical technically but had an extremely simple body made out of simple pressed metal (with almost no chrome) and many body parts made from wood, to enable production in resource-starved early post-war Japan. Early trucks also depended on leftover stocks of pre-war parts. The engine was the 15 PS (11 kW) Type 7 unit. As the supply situation improved the new 2124 and then 2225 took over in July 1947 and at the end of November of the same year.

A rapid stream of changes and new model numbers followed in this early post-war area, as pre-war parts dried up and new designs were substituted. The naming followed a clear system: the first number represented the chassis/engine iteration, with "1" being the pre-war (17T) design. The second digit was for the bonnet and grille, the third digit for the cab, and the fourth and final digit for the rear body. 1121 thus had mostly pre-war parts, with a post-war design for the cab. The 2225 had post-war chassis and front end designs, with a fourth redesign of the rear bodywork. The grille was a plain, painted pressed steel piece. Some numbers were assigned but never used, such as rear body designs 2 and 3. The 2225 was succeeded by the 2125 at the end of July 1948; this seemingly retrograde step marked the return to the more ornate pre-war 17T grille.

In January 1949 the 3135 took over, followed by the January 1950 3145 model with a slightly different cabin. In August 1950 the Datsun 4146 arrived, introducing the 860 cc Type 10 engine with 15 kW (20 hp; 20 PS). The 4146 also had a bit more chrome trim included, as well as a stronger transmission. The power increase allowed for a somewhat bigger cargo area but top speed only crept up from 67 to 70 km/h (42 to 43 mph).

In 1951 the 5147 appeared, introducing a longer wheelbase of 2,150 mm (84.6 in) rather than the 2,005 mm (78.9 in) chassis which had been used for seventeen years. Most important was the introduction of hydraulic brakes, replacing the original mechanical units. The 5147 was succeeded two years later by the final 6147 model, which received the 25 PS (18 kW; 25 hp) D-10 version of the old sidevalve engine. The extra power output was made possible because of higher quality petrol allowing for higher compression rates. Although somewhat longer and with a bigger engine, the Datsun 6147 remained very similar to the prewar type 15 truck. Payload increased from 500 to 600 kg (1,100 to 1,300 lb) while overall length increased to 3,406 mm (134.1 in). A rare double-cab version, the DU-5, was introduced alongside the 6147. The 6147 was built until the 1955 introduction of the all new 120-series truck.

== Datsun 120 ==
Datsun 120/220
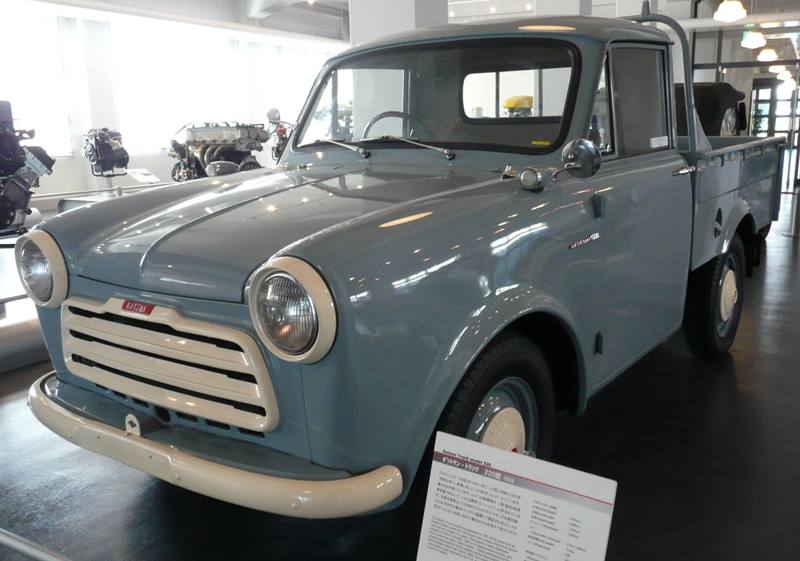
- Datsun 220

Overview
- Production: 1955–1961
- Assembly: Nissan Shatai, Hiratsuka, Kanagawa, Japan

Body and chassis
- Body style: 2-door pickup; 2-door double cab pickup; 3-door van/panel van
- Layout: FR layout
- Related: Datsun Bluebird 110; Datsun Bluebird 210

Powertrain
- Engine: 860 cc Type 10 I4 (120–124); 860 cc B-1 I4 (125, 126); 988 cc C I4 (220–222); 1189 cc E I4 (export); 1189 cc E-1 I4 (223)
- Transmission: 4-speed manual

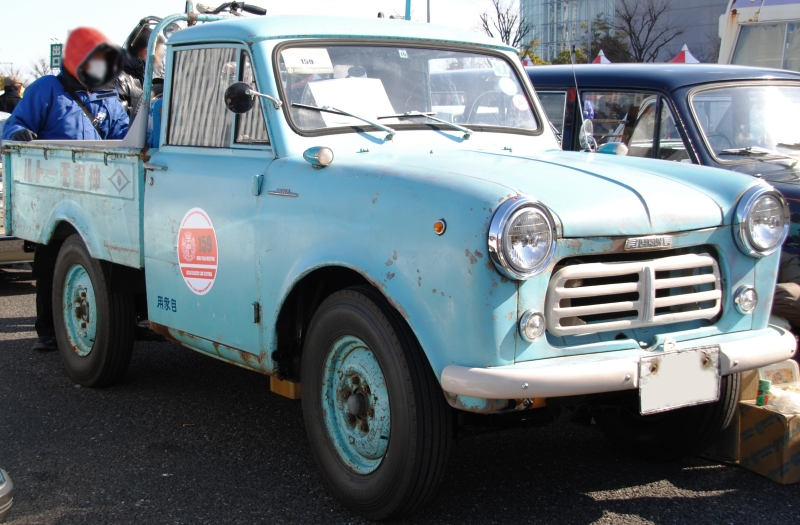
1955 Datsun 120 truck

The Datsun 120 was a load-carrying version of the Datsun 1000 sedan (110 series), and was introduced in January 1955 as the latest Datsun truck with up-to-date styling. Delivery van, panel van (120 only), and double cab versions were available. Until 1959 it used the 25 PS, 860 cc Datsun Type 10 engine with a four-speed floor shift (column shift for the 123 and later versions) manual transmission. It was joined with a larger commercially focused vehicle called the Nissan Junior. This was one of the first Nissan products to be sold in Europe, when an order of 200 units were shipped to Spain in 1956.

During its six years in production, six main models were built: 120 (Jan. to Dec. 1955), 122 (Dec. 1955 to May 1956) and 123 (Jun. 1956 to Sep. 1957). For reasons unknown, Nissan skipped the 121 designation. The L123 was the first left-hand drive version built by Nissan, in response to requests from importers in the Middle East. The L123 also received the new hydraulic clutch system developed for the upcoming 210/220 cars and trucks, as Nissan's engineers did not want to use a rod to transfer clutch pedal movements, fearing vibrations and noise.

After the introduction of the re-engined 220-series truck, the Datsun 124 was introduced in October 1957 as a modernized low-cost option. It continued to use the same bodywork and engine as the 123, although with less chrome trim. This was then followed by the re-engined Datsun 125 in 1959 and finally by the Datsun 126 in 1960. While the 124 was still powered by the Type 10 engine, the 125 and 126 received an improved version of this engine called the B-1, rated at 27 PS (20 kW).

=== Datsun 220 ===
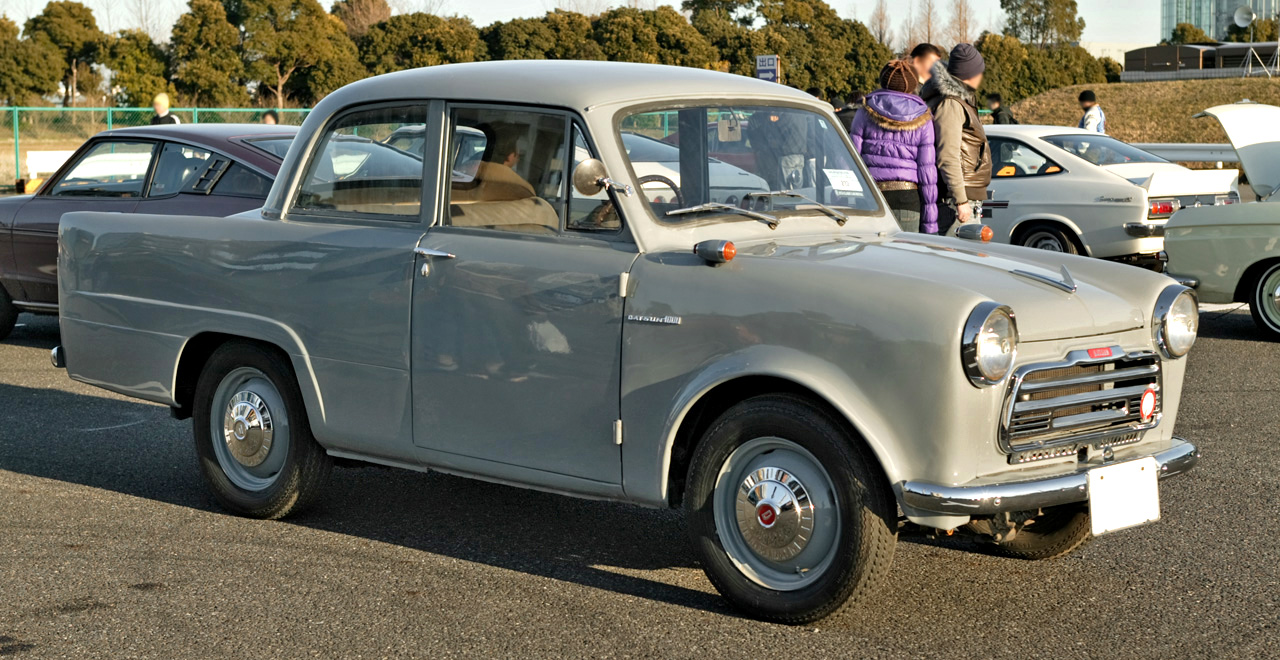
Datsun U220 Coupe utility

In November 1957, the Datsun 220 was introduced, which was capable to carry a 850 kg (1,874 lb) payload. Largely unchanged in appearance from the 120-series, which continued to be built as a cheaper version, it was produced from 1957 to 1961. It was the first Datsun truck to be exported to the United States. The 220 can be identified by its different grille, featuring a more pronounced frame. During this time four models were produced: 220 (1957–1958), 221 (1958–1959), 222 (1960), and 223 (introduced in July 1959). The chassis was based on the 210 series sedans with which it also shared the engines. Two engines were available: the 37 PS Nissan C engine, and the 48 PS Nissan E engine. Introduced in August 1958, the G220 had a 1,000 kg (2,200 lb) payload and a 300 mm (12 in) longer wheelbase; there were also updated G221 and G222 models offered. The E engine was originally only used in models sold on the export market. The 220 was the first Datsun truck to be equipped with a 12 volt electrical system. The clutch was now hydraulically operated, with a hanging pedal.

Double cab and delivery van versions were available. Side badges were "Datsun 1000" or "Datsun 1200". There was also a round badge on the dashboard that said "Datsun 1000" or "Datsun 1200", depending on the engine. A long bed version was introduced with the 222. As a low cost option, a lightly changed model of the D10 sidevalve-engined predecessor was introduced in October 1957 (the Datsun 124), followed by the Datsun 125 in 1959 and finally the Datsun 126 in 1960. The 125 and 126 were powered by the B-1, an improved version of the D10 with 27 PS (20 kW).

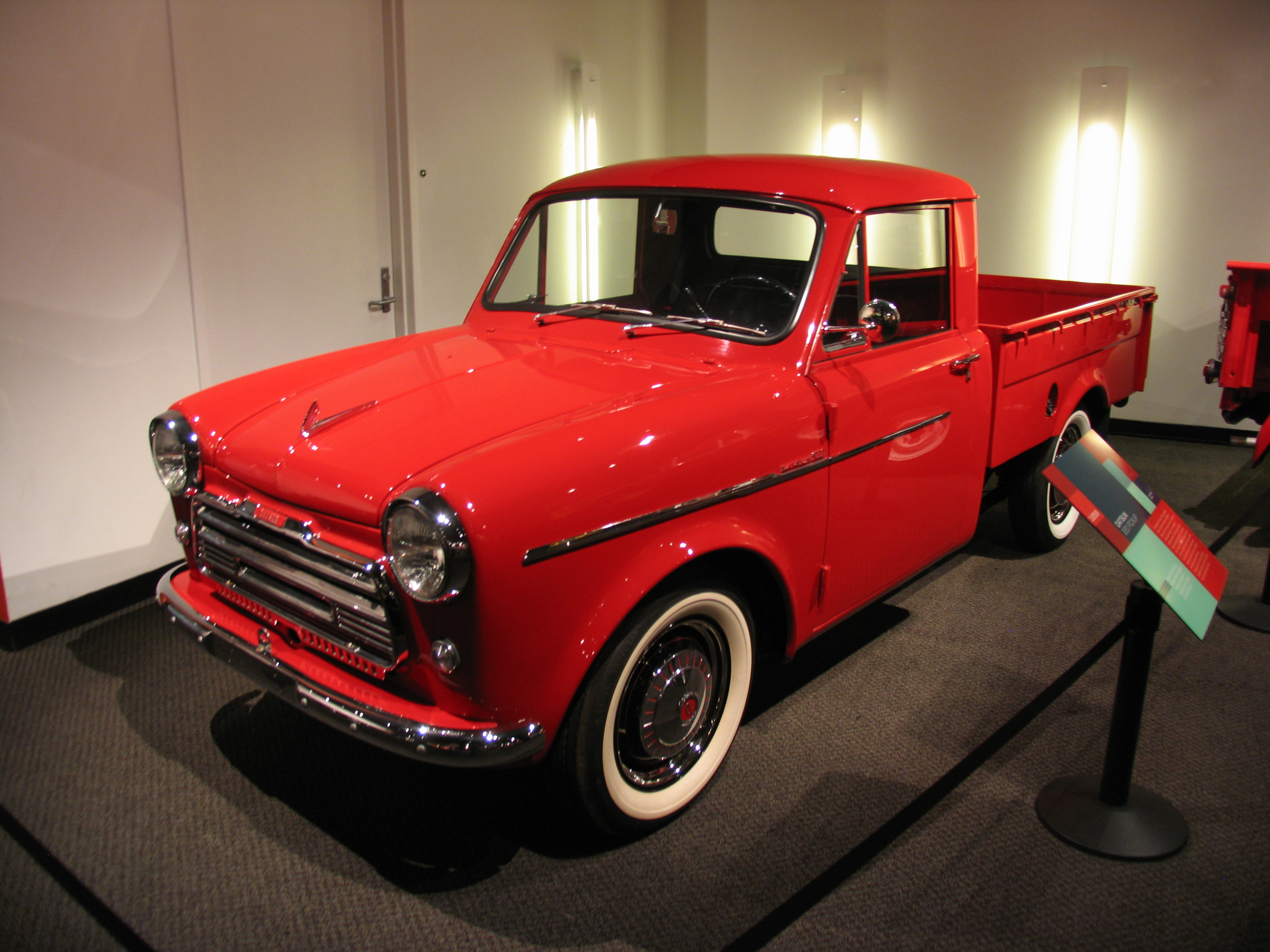
The 1959 Datsun 221 pickup, with more traditional turn signal locations next to the front grille

The original 220 had distinct front turn signals mounted atop the fenders, not far ahead of the windshield. On the improved 221 model (October 1958), these were replaced by more conventionally placed units next to the grille as US regulations did not permit the original layout. Another development which resulted from exposure to the American market was a strengthened rear axle which was also capable of prolonged highway speeds.

The 223 was powered by the new 1.2-liter E-1 engine, rated at 60 PS. The 223 received a round "60 HP" badge on the fenders. The 223 also had a revised chassis and suspension system. The front I-beam suspension used on the 220, 221 and 222 was replaced with an independent front suspension with torsion bars. The steering was updated to a worm-and-roller system while the brakes were now power assisted. These new systems took advantage of parts developed for the not-yet released Nissan Cedric sedan.

In 1958, the Datsun 220 (and the 210 sedan) was exhibited at the Los Angeles Auto Show, with American exports beginning soon after. It was the 220 Series that officially established Datsun in the American market.

== Datsun 320 ==
Datsun 320
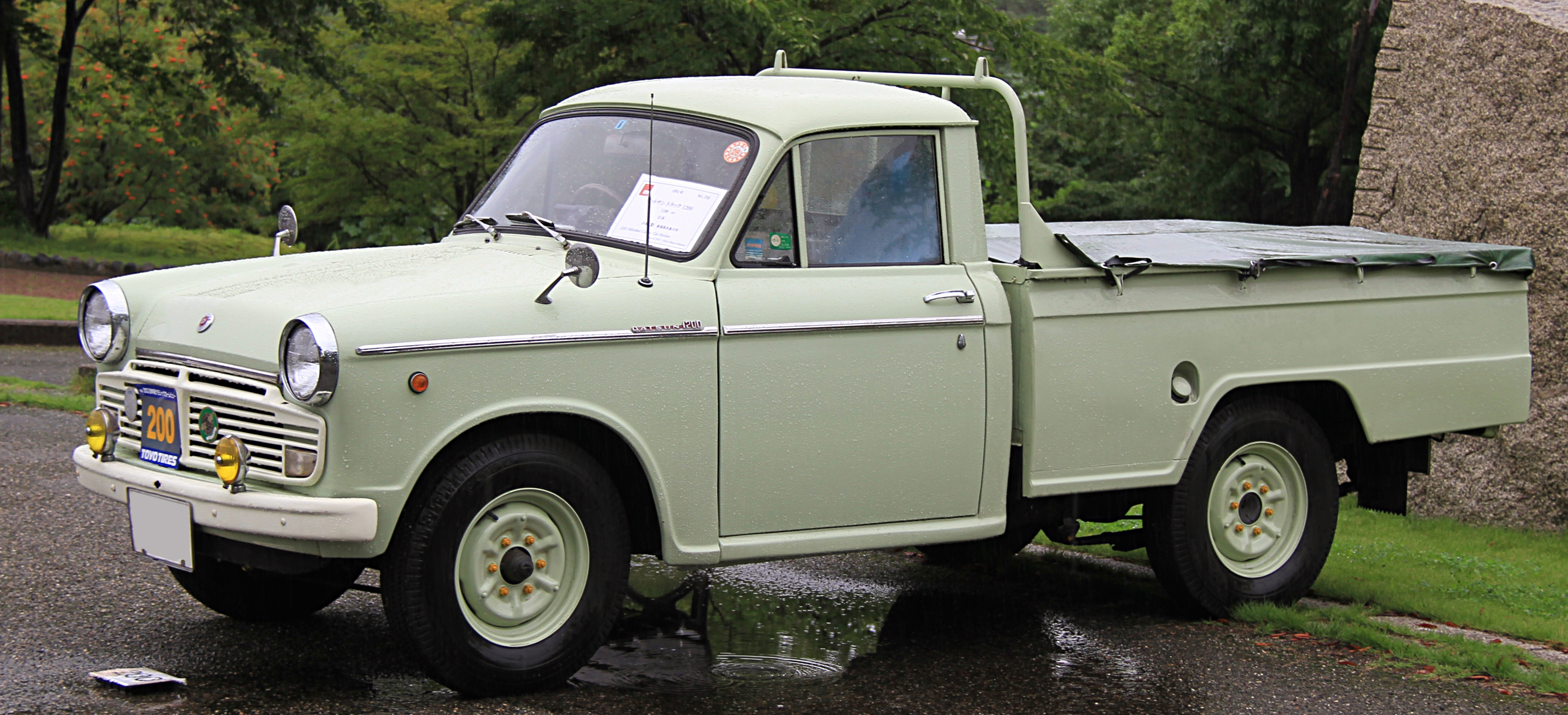
- 1964 Datsun 1200 (standard bed)

Overview
- Production: 1961–1965
- Assembly: Nissan Shatai, Hiratsuka, Kanagawa, Japan; Samut Prakan, Thailand

Body and chassis
- Body style: 2-door pickup; 2-door coupe utility; 2-door double cab pickup; 3-door van/panel van
- Layout: FR layout
- Related: Datsun Bluebird (310)

Powertrain
- Engine: 1.2 L E-1 I4

Dimensions
- Wheelbase: 2,470 mm (97.2 in)

In August 1961 the new 320 Series was released. It was produced until 1965 in three series (320–322). The 320 Series' underpinnings were largely inherited from the earlier 120/220, although with clear improvements and using body panels and overall design language of the new 310-series Bluebird. It used the Nissan E-1 engine which had already been seen in the earlier 223. This engine produced 60 PS. Nissan updated the larger commercially focused Nissan Junior in 1962.

All Datsun trucks kept the A-arm torsion bar front suspension with leaf-spring rear ends and had a 1/2 ton load capacity. Rear end gearing was a low 4.875:1 along with a four-speed transmission; as a result, the 320 was not freeway friendly above 60 mph. Fender emblems showed "Datsun 1200" and "60 HP" ("55ps" for models sold in Japan) with a "Datsun" emblem on the front nose of the hood.

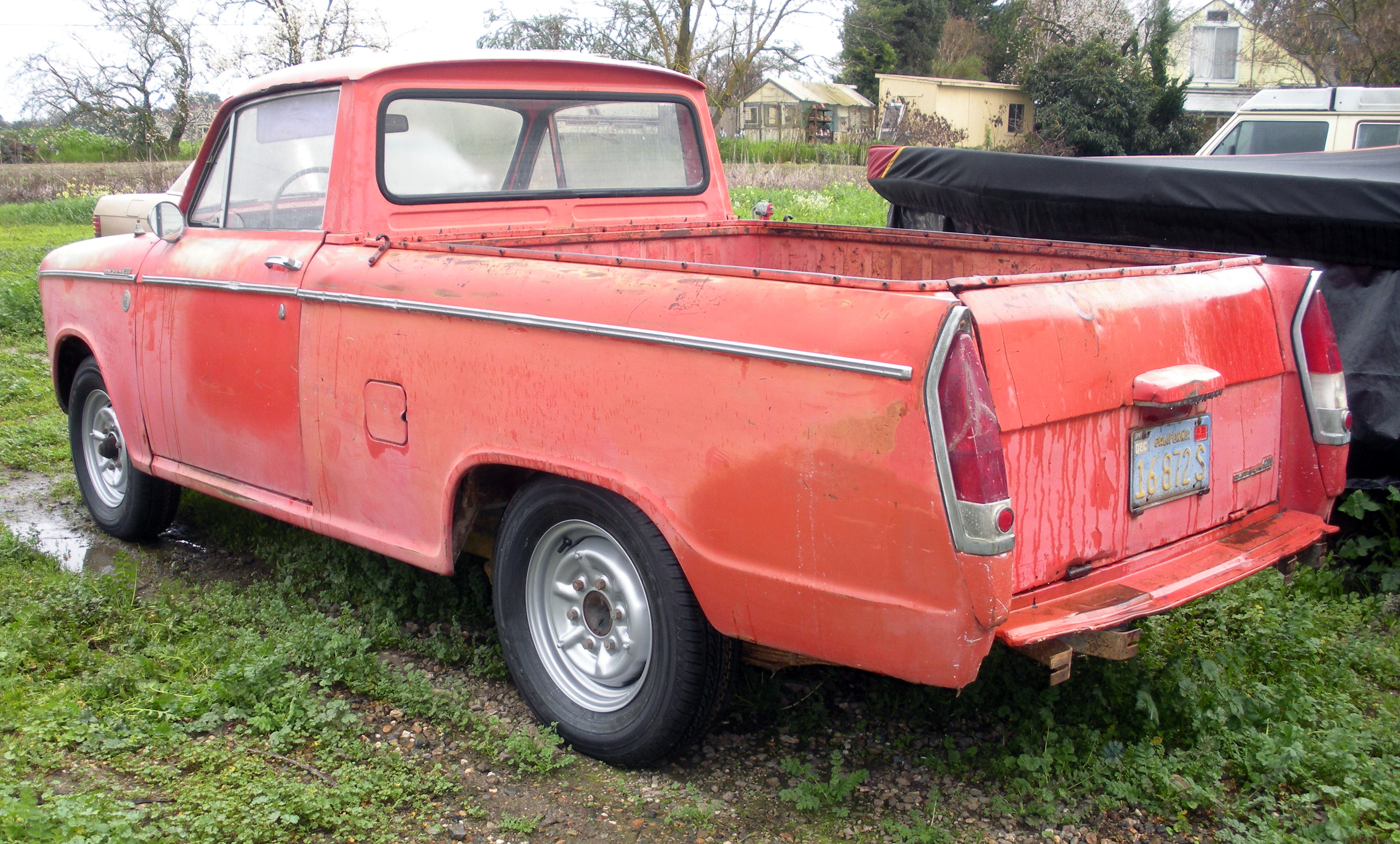
1964 Datsun 1200 (N320 "Sports Pick-Up" with integrated cab)

Available body styles included a single cab "truck" (320), a long wheelbase single cab truck (G320), a double cab "pickup" with flush sides (U320), and a three-door "van" (V320). Though described (and taxed) as a van in the Japanese market, the V320 is essentially a two-door station wagon. The 320 came in two cab and bed versions: Regular, and as the N320 "Sports Pick-Up" (1963–65) variation which is a rarer (around 1,000 produced) version with the cab and bed of a one-piece design. Its back half is greatly different from that of the standard, separate bed 320 pick-up; it uses much of the rear sheet metal and the taillights from the V320 Light Van.

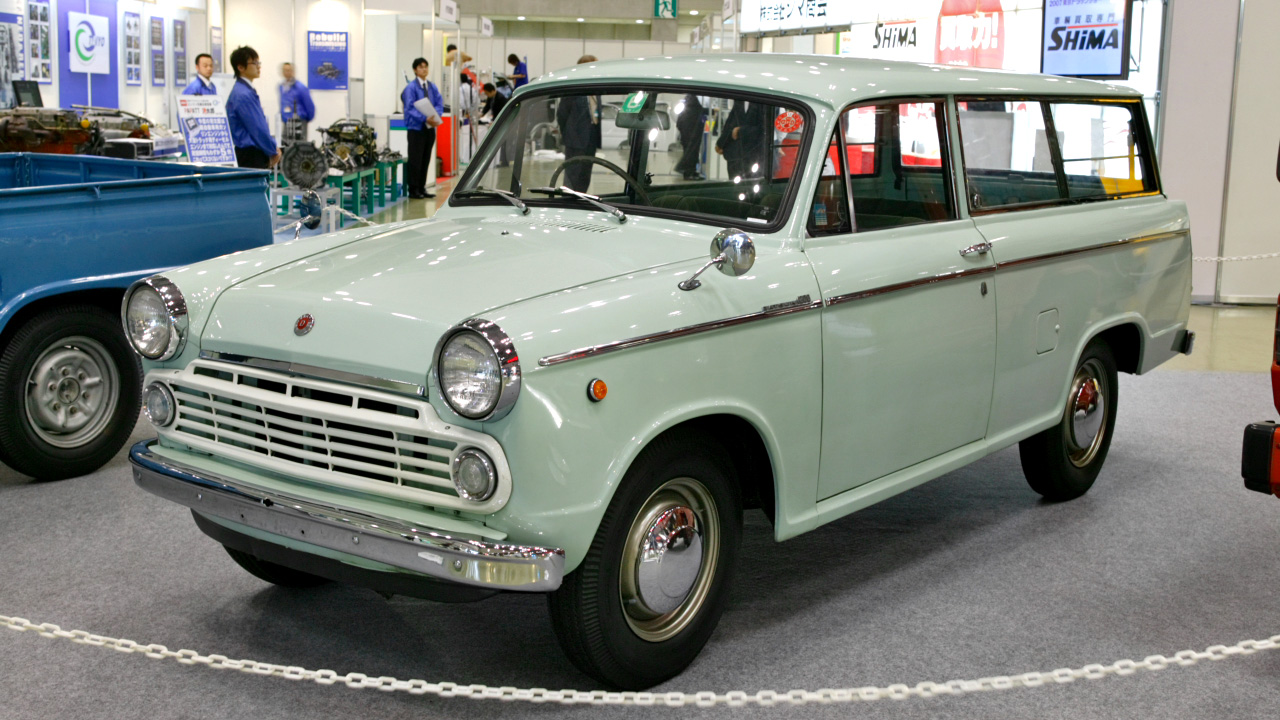
Datsun V320 Van

Bed and luggage space were in addition to the expansion, with the support of the market characteristics and the robust chassis engine was easy to handle, it was a best seller in the truck market segment.

The 310 chassis was also a sales hit with the reinforcement of the Datsun Bluebird 310, a variation of the same series, in which the X-members plus a reinforcement of the Fairlady Roadster of the S310-Type CSP311. It was also used for the new Nissan Silvia coupé.

In 1964, the 320 underwent minor changes. Having added the failed Light Stout, Toyota took over Hino's Briska and then continued with the Hilux. Mazda also competed in this segment with the Mazda B-Series. In 1960, Nissan assumed operations of the Minsei Diesel Industries, Ltd., renaming the company as Nissan Diesel Motor Co., Ltd (now UD Trucks).

== Datsun 520 ==
Datsun 520 & 521
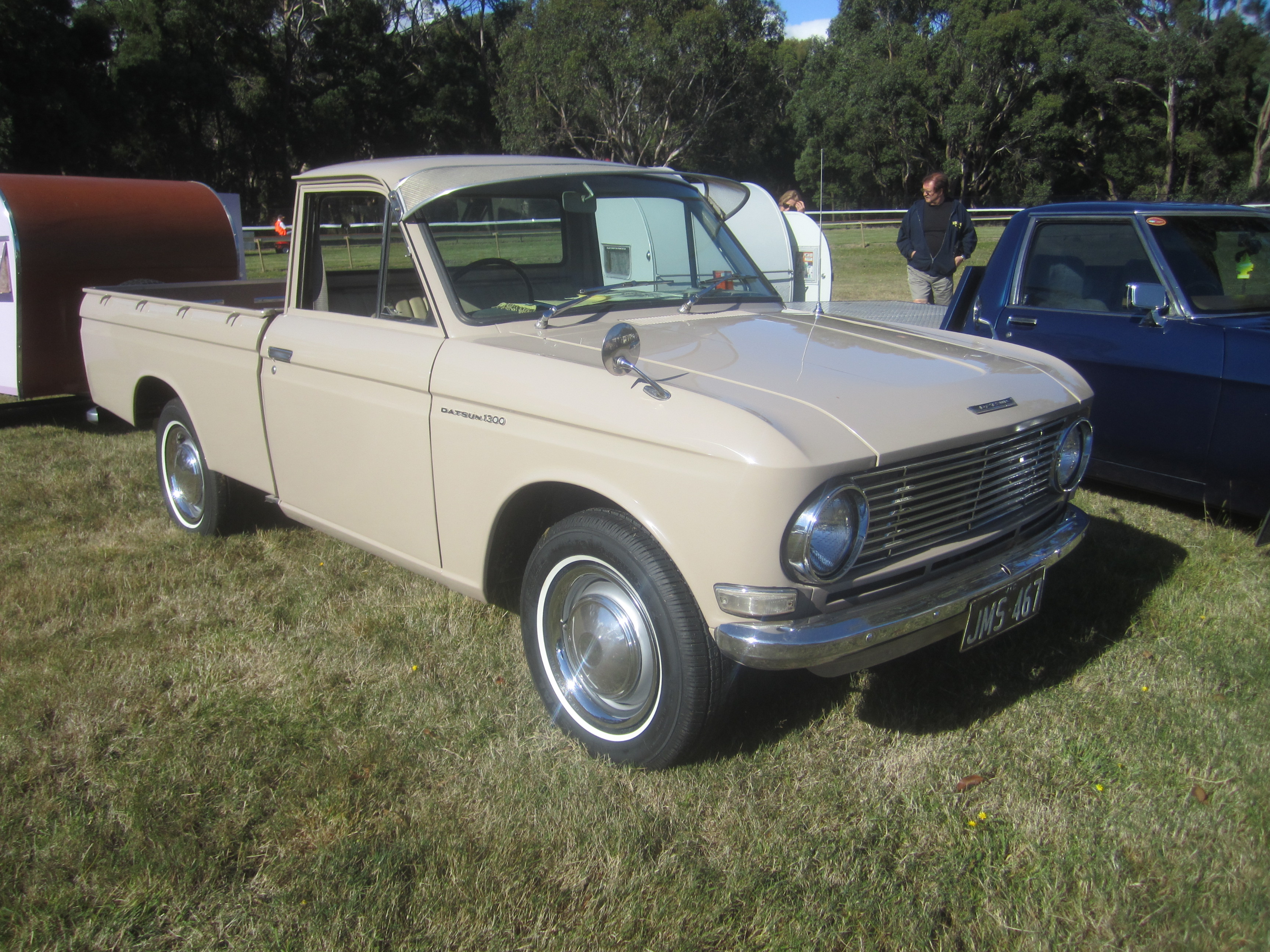
- 1965 Datsun 520

Overview
- Production: 1965–1972
- Assembly: Nissan Shatai, Hiratsuka, Kanagawa, Japan; Samut Prakan, Thailand; Auckland, New Zealand

Body and chassis
- Body style: 2-door pickup (separate/flush); 2-door double cab pickup; 3-door van/panel van
- Layout: FR layout
- Related: Nissan Bluebird 410

Powertrain
- Engine: 1.3 L J13 I4 (520/521); 1.5 L J15 I4 (521); 1.6 L L16 I4 (521)

Dimensions
- Wheelbase: 2,530 mm (99.6 in); 2,770 mm (109.1 in) (G520/521)

The Datsun 520 was built from May 1965 to May 1968, when it was facelifted and became the 521. The 420 designation, which was next in sequence, was skipped as it is a homophone for the Japanese word for "rudeness" or "impolite" (see Japanese wordplay). It used the new 1.3-litre, 67 hp Nissan J13. In 1965 and 1966, the 520 had two headlights (one per side). For 1967, the 520 was slightly redesigned and received quad headlights (two per side). This design was carried on until the end of 520 production. Single cab (520, and L520 for left-hand drive version), LWB Single cab (G520), Double cab (U520) and delivery van (V520) versions were available. "G" was used to identify the long wheelbase versions. The fender emblems said "Datsun 1300". A grille emblem was added in 1966 and simply said "D". In late 1967, a slightly altered model appeared, now with a slightly changed chrome grille with a distinct frame.

In 1967, Nissan added the Sunny Pickup Truck, which was exclusive to Nissan Saito Store locations, which closely shared the dimensions, engine displacement and load carrying duties of the 520 Series truck.

The 521 was the facelifted version of 520, with a so-called "flat-deck" style. This meant it featured a flattened bonnet and front fenders as well as a new grille design. It used the Nissan J engines (the previously mentioned J13 or the larger J15, rated at 77 hp) and later had a 70 kW (94 hp; 95 PS) Nissan L16 engine, always with a straight rear axle. The 520 strongly resembles a Datsun 410/411 from the front, since it shares most sheet metal with that car. The fender emblems said "Datsun 1300", "Datsun 1500" or "Datsun 1600" (depending on engine fitment). Van/delivery van (V521) and double cab (U521) versions were also available. It was manufactured from June 1968 until 1972, preceded by the 520 and followed by the 620. The 521 was the first compact half-ton pickup sold in the American market, in 1968.

In 1968, larger load carrying duties were now shared with the Datsun Cabstar, a cabover truck sharing a chassis with the third generation Nissan Junior.

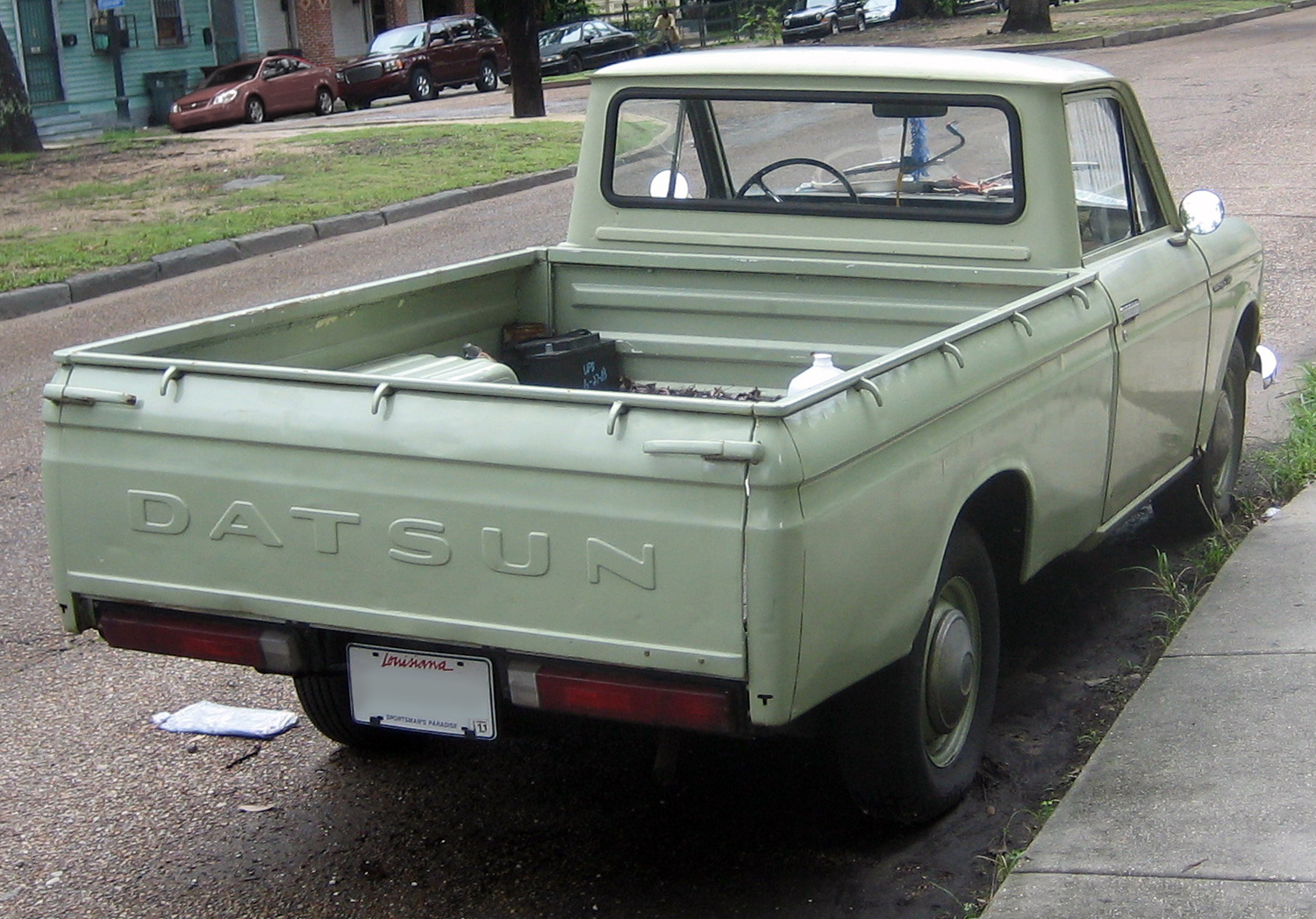
Rear view of Datsun 1300 (520, US)

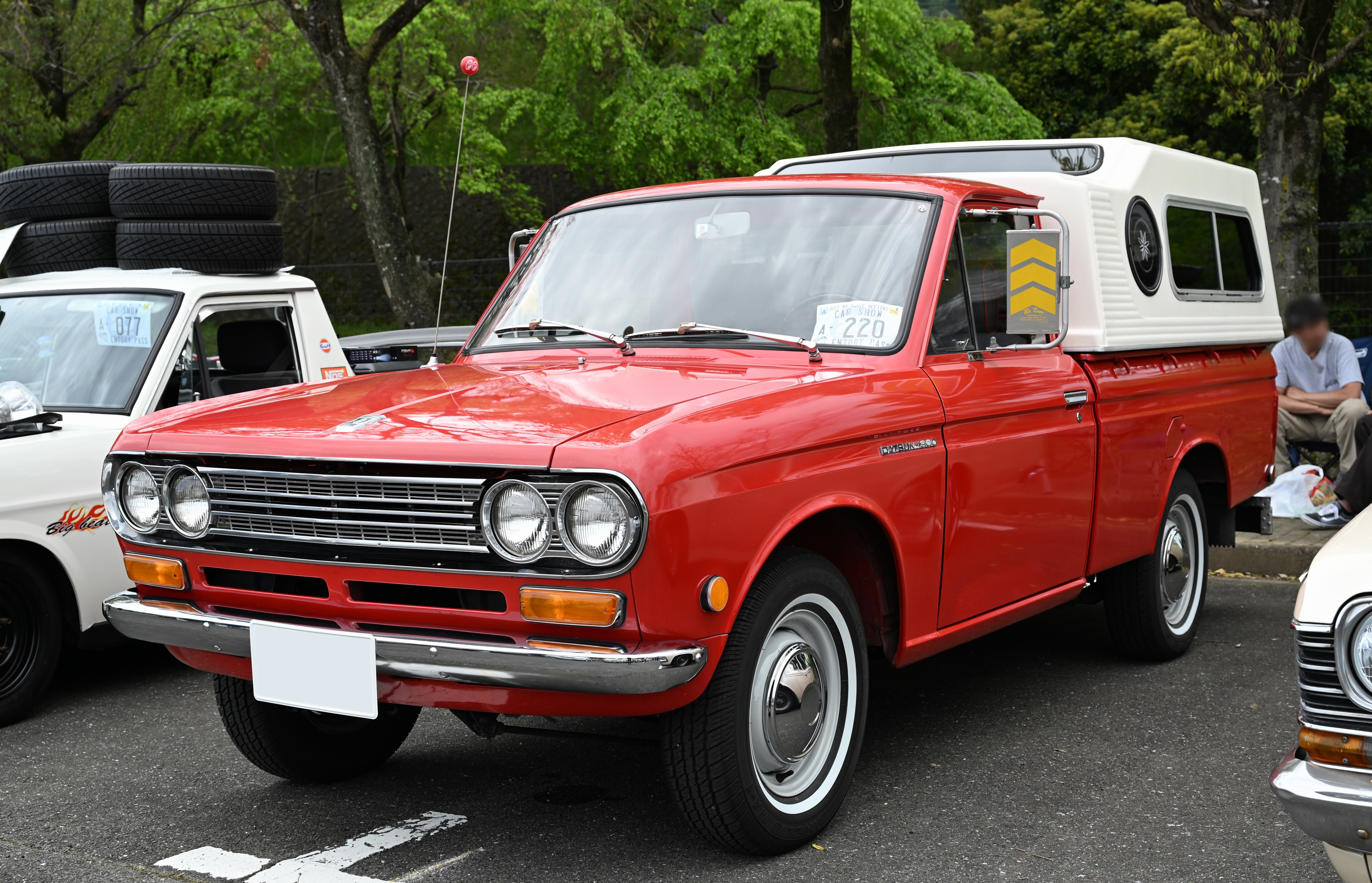
1968 Datsun 1300 single cab (521)

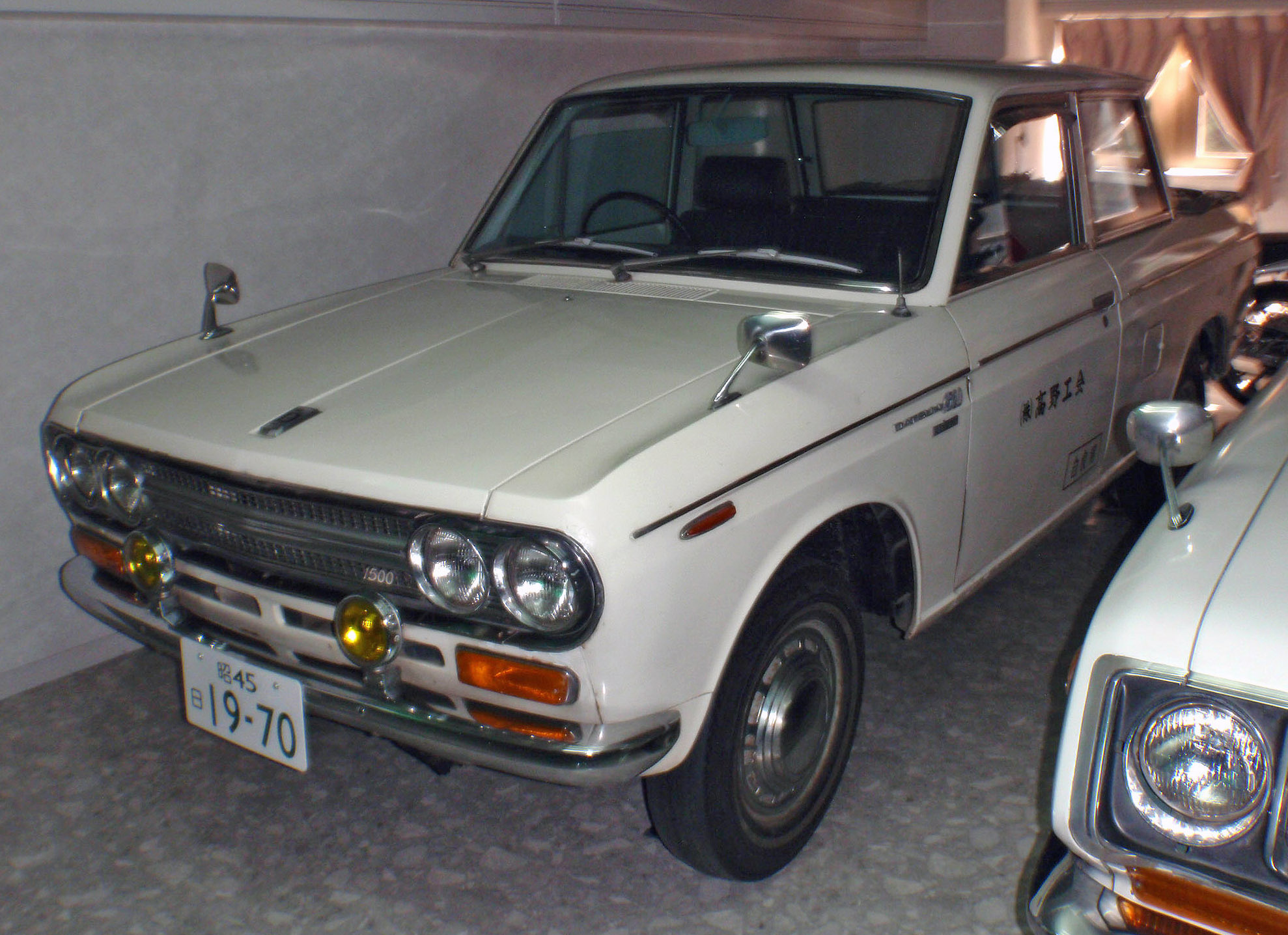
1970 Datsun 1500 double cab facelift (U521)

== Datsun 620 ==
Datsun 620
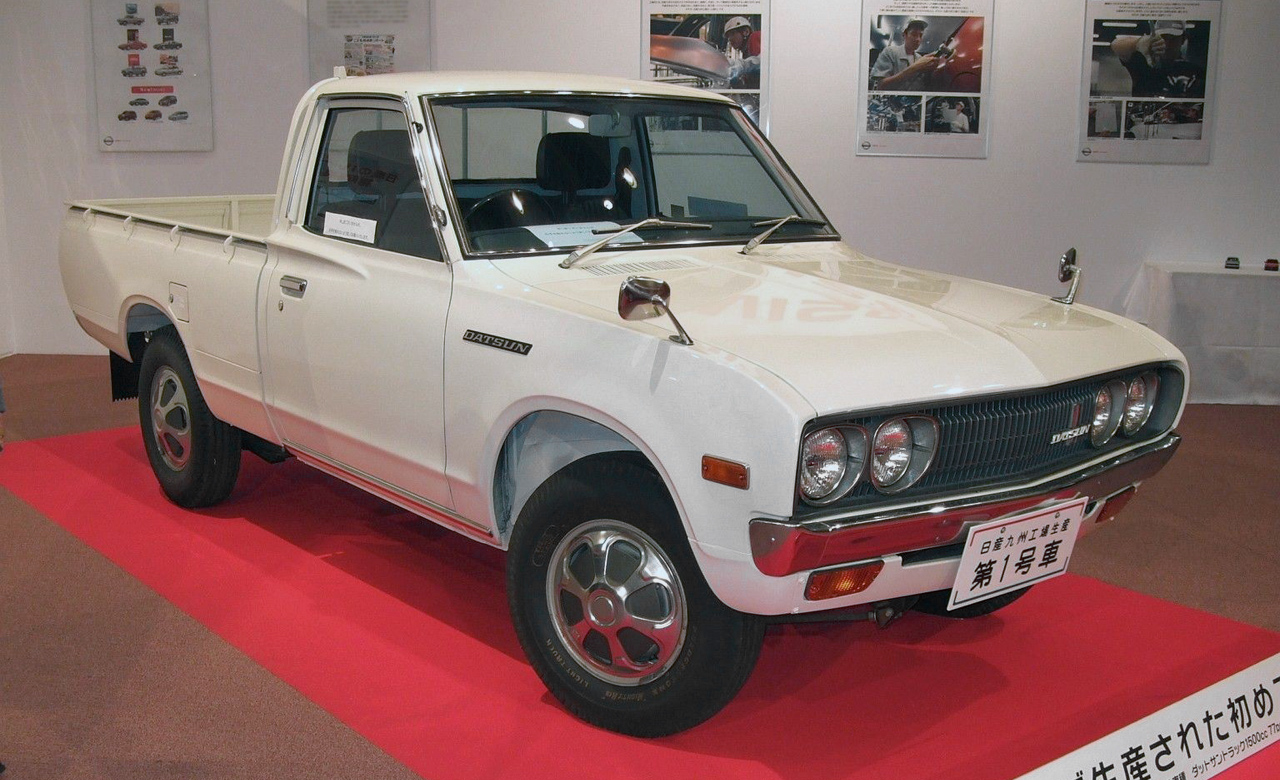
- Datsun 620

Overview
- Also called: Datsun 680 (South Africa); Datsun 1500 (Argentina, Costa Rica); Yue Loong 752/753 (Taiwan)
- Production: 1972–1979
- Model years: 1973–1979
- Assembly: Nissan Shatai, Hiratsuka, Kanagawa, Japan; Samut Prakan, Thailand; Makati, Philippines; Auckland, New Zealand

Body and chassis
- Class: Compact truck
- Body style: 2-door single cab; 2-door single cab long bed; 2-door extended cab (King Cab); 4-door double cab; 3-door delivery van; 2-door coupe utility (U620)
- Layout: FR layout
- Related: Nissan Bluebird 610

Powertrain
- Engine: 1.5 L J15 I4; 1.6 L L16 I4; 1.8 L L18 I4; 2.0 L L20B I4; 2.2 L SD22 diesel I4 (R620)
- Transmission: 3-speed 3N71 automatic; 4-speed F4W63 manual (1972–1973); 4-speed F4W71 manual (1974–1979); 5-speed FS5W71B manual (option from 1977)

Dimensions
- Wheelbase: 2,545 mm (100.2 in); 2,785 mm (109.6 in) (G/GN620)

In February 1972, the Datsun 620 was released and was in production until 1979. It was a regular cab truck (a longer "King Cab" [Nissan's trademark for their extended cab trucks] version was released in 1977) and two wheelbases were offered, for a total of six different models. There was also a delivery van version, offered only in Japan. Naturally, there were bare chassis models, and many importers installed locally made flat decks. There was also the U620, which is a crew cab "Utility" version. It uses a shorter, fully integrated bed for comfortably seating four people. The U620 was essentially a 620 pickup from the doors forward, with the bed and rear end being the only difference. Nissan continued the strong rhythms and styling of its previous vehicles, with a shoulder "wing line" or "Bullet Side" accent running alongside the vehicle. In most of the world the 620 was equipped with the J15, producing 57 kW (77 hp; 78 PS) and a claimed top speed of 135 km/h (84 mph). A 2.2 liter diesel engine with 49 kW (66 hp; 67 PS) was later made available in many markets.

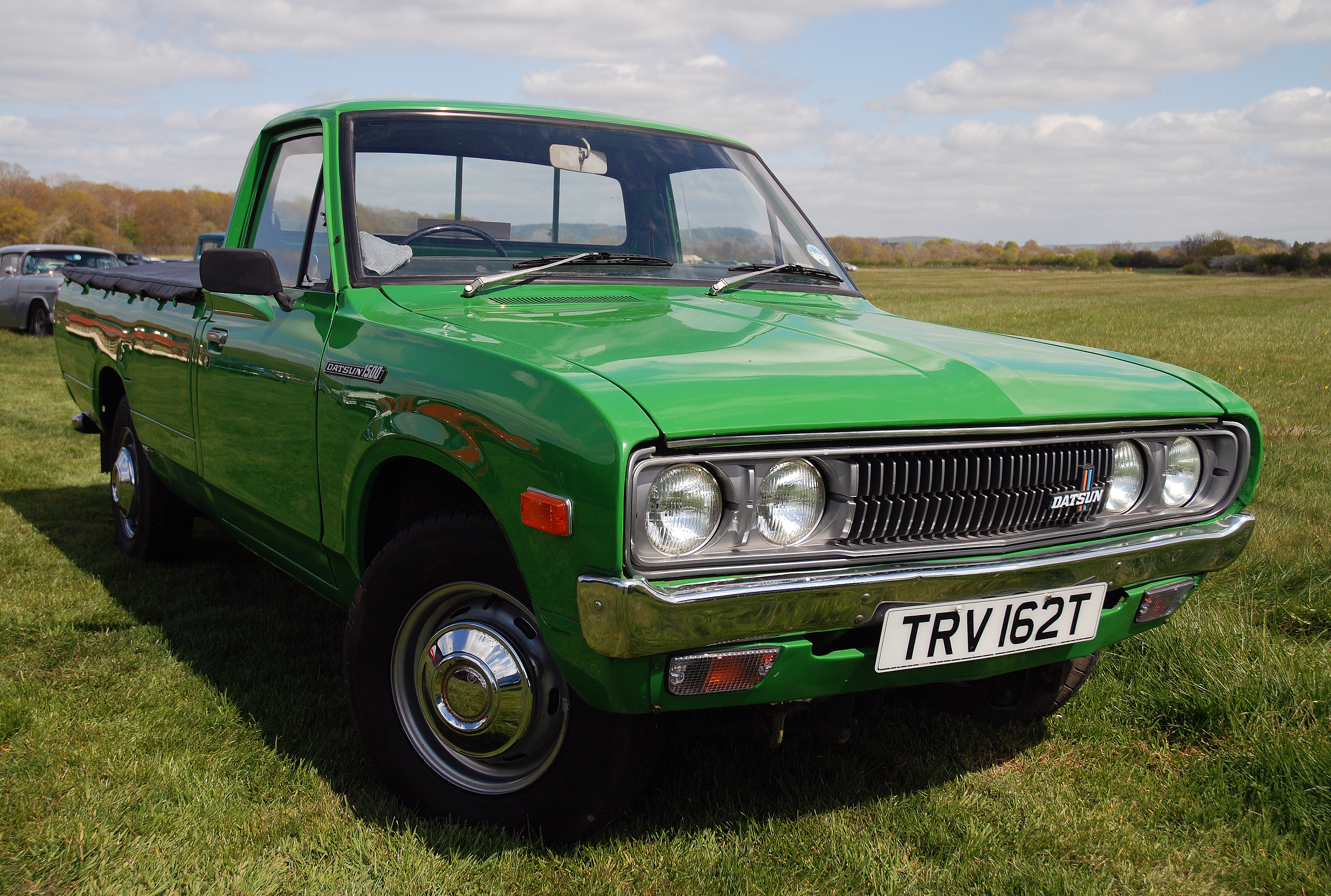
Datsun 620

The 620 was also the first Datsun pickup truck to be available with a longer "King Cab" passenger compartment (called "Custom" in Japan). This used the bed from the normal 620 truck, but has a cabin stretched by 24 cm (10 in), all placed on the longer wheelbase.

The 620 was redesigned slightly for 1978, with changes to grille and front bumper. The suspension was also revised, increasing track at both ends by 30 mm (1.2 in). This also marked a name change in South Africa, where it had been sold simply as the Datsun One-Ton Pick-Up, to "Datsun 680". A four-door crew cab variant was also offered in some markets.

=== North America ===
In North America, the 620 continued to use the Nissan L engine. The 1972 and 1973 models were powered by the L16 engine (96 hp), the 1974 model used the L18 engine (100 hp), and the 1975 through 1979 models used the L20B engine (110 hp SAE gross).) SAE net rating was 97 hp (72 kW). This was a "50-state car", with an EGR system for pollution control which sufficed to meet California's stringent emissions standards without a catalytic converter. The 620 was available with two wheelbases and also as the extended King Cab model from 1977. In Canada, Nissan marketed the 620 as the "Sportruck", and in the United States as the "Li'l Hustler". In North America it was generally treated as transportation, with 40% of buyers saying that they never used the truck for "work". The standard transmissions were the F4W63 four-speed (1972 and 1973) and F4W71 four-speed (1974 to 1979). In 1977, the optional FS5W71B five-speed manual transmission became available. The 3N71 three-speed automatic became available as an option in mid-1972. This was the first series to offer an automatic transmission as an option (all model series before the 620 only had manual transmissions). Final drive gearing was 4.375:1.

Side badges read "DATSUN 1600" or simply "DATSUN". The grille badge was two colored stripes (one red and one blue) behind the word "DATSUN". The 620 was known for its durability and weather resistance despite its small size, along with engines known for their reliability. As a result, the 620 was competing with the larger American pickup trucks, which in turn gave Datsun a strong reputation in the United States. A number of innovations were introduced with the 620: first long-bed (1975), first extended-cab (1977), front disc brakes (1978), and electronic ignition (1978).

Gallery

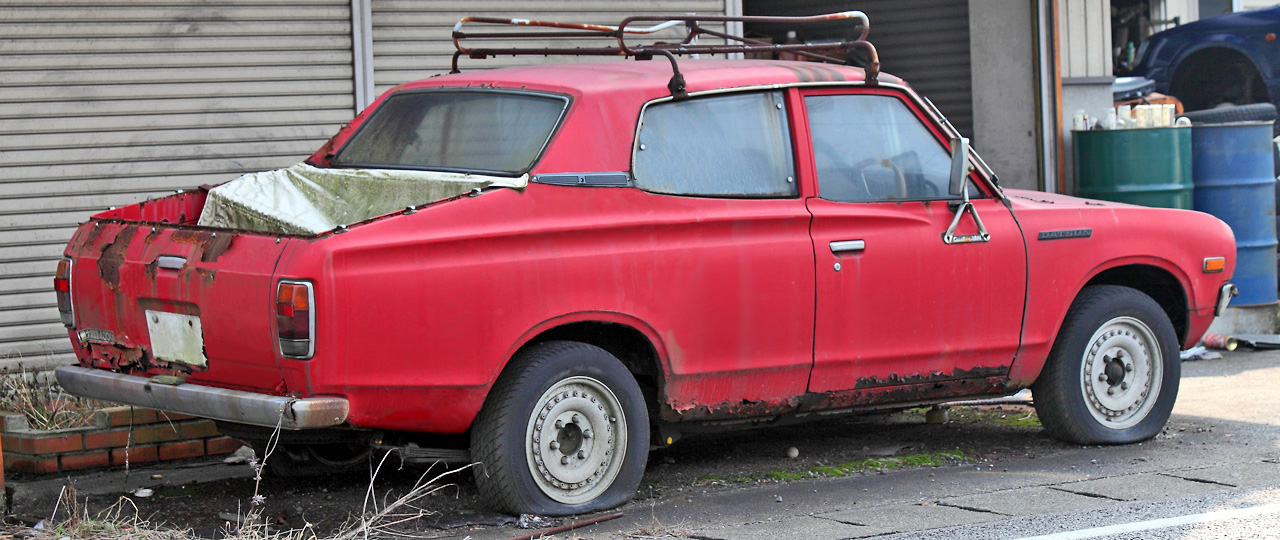
Datsun U620, a rare Japanese market "Utility" version

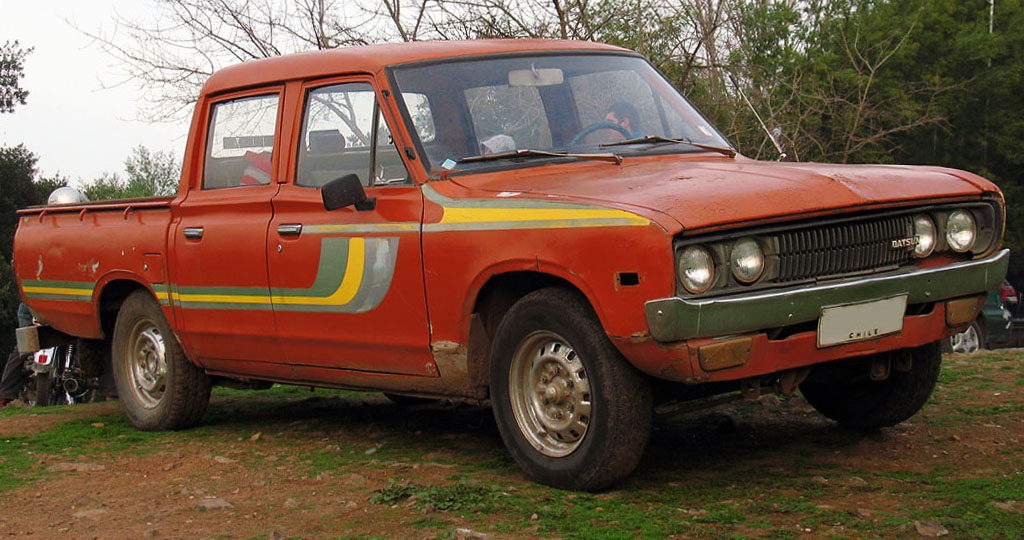
1978 Datsun 1500 Crew Cab

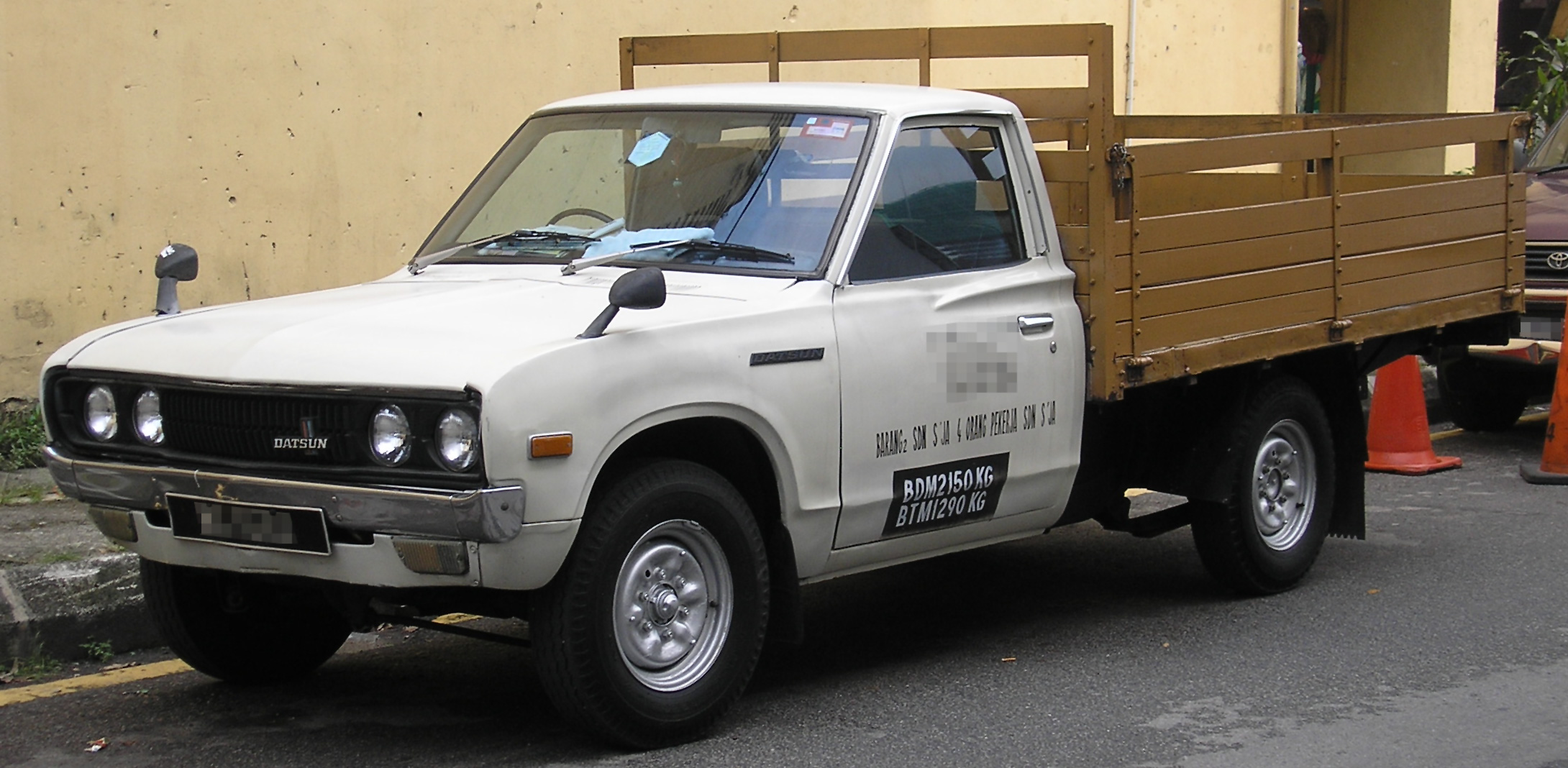
Datsun 620 "Bullet Side" pickup in Malaysia.

== Datsun/Nissan 720 ==
Datsun 720
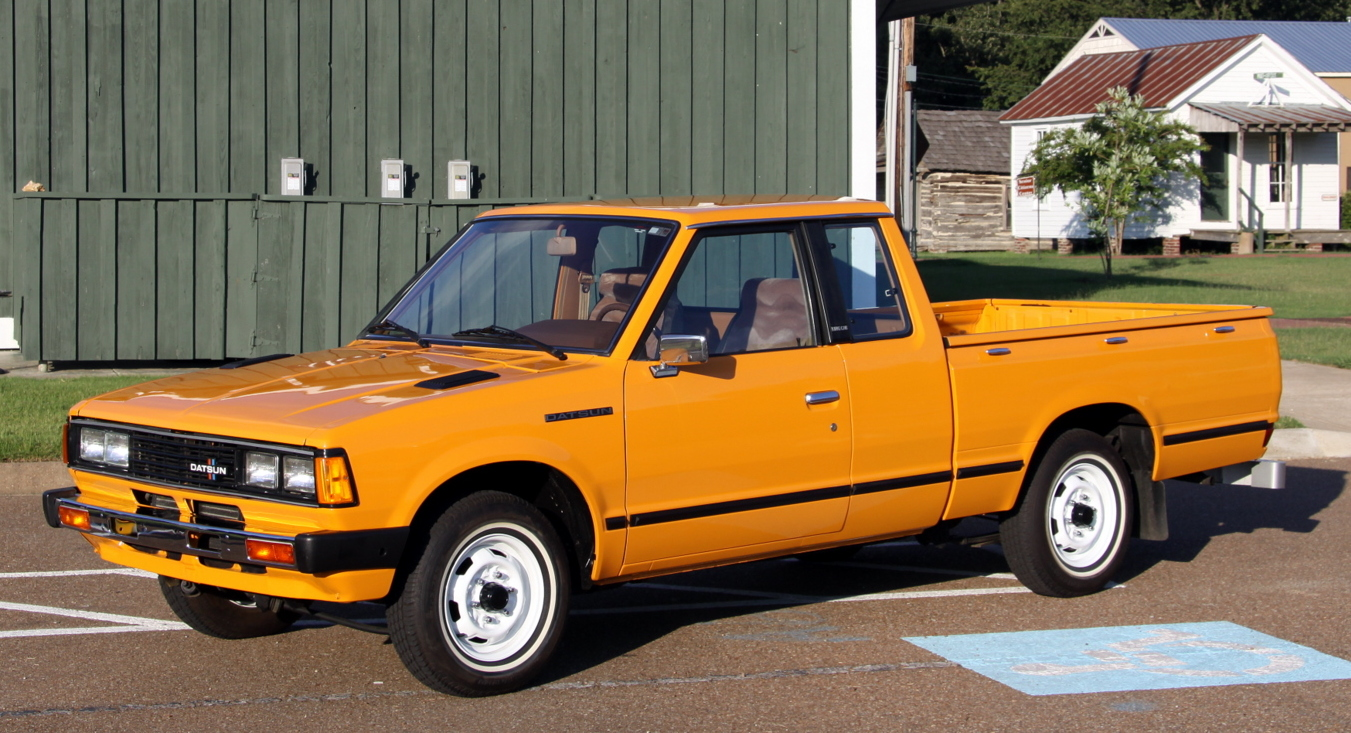
- 1980 Datsun 720 2-door "King Cab" (US)

Overview
- Also called: Yue Loong "Thunderbird" 755 (TW); Nissan 720 (1985–1986); Nissan 1800/J18 (Chile); Nissan Junior 720 (Colombia); Nissan Professional (Thailand); Nissan/Datsun Estaquitas (Mexico)
- Production: 1979–1986 (Japan); 1980–1986 (US); 1980–1993 (Mexico); 1980–1987 (Taiwan)
- Assembly: Nissan Shatai, Kanda, Fukuoka, Japan; Samut Prakan, Thailand; Makati, Philippines; Volos, Greece (TEOKAR); Smyrna, Tennessee, US; Sanyi, Miaoli, Taiwan; Auckland, New Zealand; South Africa: Rosslyn, Gauteng (NSA)

Body and chassis
- Body style: 2-door pickup; 4-door pickup
- Layout: FR layout / F4 layout
- Related: Nissan Violet 710

Powertrain
- Engine: petrol: 1.5 L J15 I4; 1.6 L J16 I4; 1.6 L Z16 I4; 1.75 L J18 I4 (Mexico and Chile); 1.8 L Z18 I4 (Chile 4WD 1980-1983); 1.8 L L18 I4; 2.0 L L20B I4 (1979.5-1980); 2.0 L Z20S I4 (1981); 2.2 L Z22S I4 (1981–1982); 2.4 L Z24 I4 (1983–1986); 2.4 L Z24i I4 (option, 1986); diesel: 2.2 L SD22 I4; 2.3 L SD23 I4; 2.5 L SD25 I4
- Transmission: 4-speed manual (up to 1983 USA); 5-speed manual; 3-speed automatic

Dimensions
- Wheelbase: 2,575 mm (101.4 in) (SWB); 2,815 mm (110.8 in) (LWB)
- Width: 1,610 mm (63.4 in) (2WD); 1,685 mm (66.3 in) (4WD)

In October 1979, Nissan introduced the Datsun 720 as successor to the 620. A four-door crew cab version of the 720 was available in most markets (excluding North America). In addition, some overseas models continued with the early style beds in the later model years as well as the lower cost round headlamps, and included various combinations of Datsun and Nissan badging while retaining the Datsun name throughout all model years. In Japan, round headlights were standard but higher-end models like the GL received square headlamps. In Japan, the standard engine was originally the J16 but in 1982 this was changed to the more modern Z16 derivative.

In 1983, the front end underwent a transformation with a larger grille, bumper, and corner lights. There was also a revised dashboard with round instead of square gauges. At the same time, the regular cab was lengthened slightly and the air extractor vents behind the cab doors changed from the high "flag" look to long, narrow ones that matched the height of the window opening. The cabs of the King Cab versions were unchanged.

=== Engine and Drivetrain ===
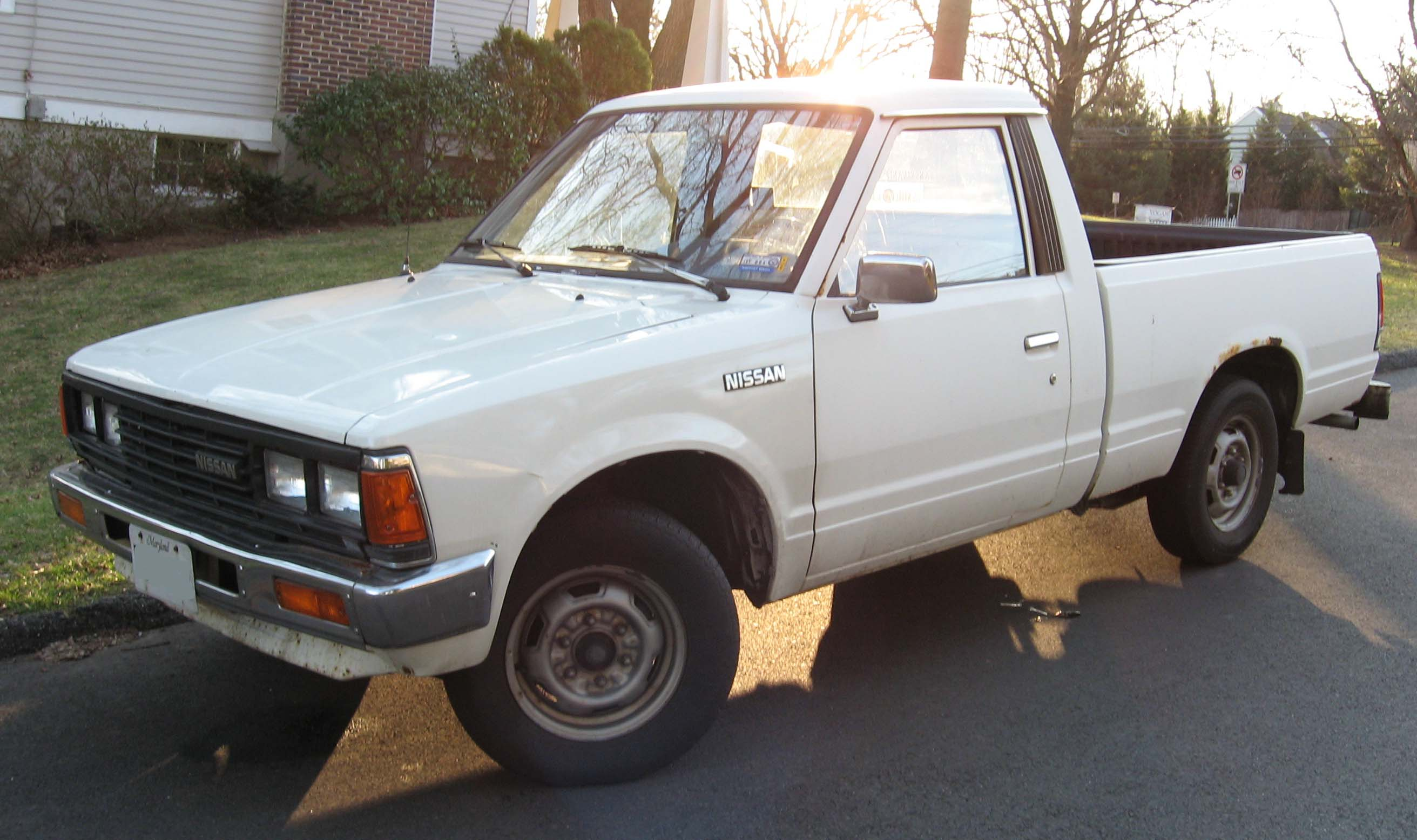
Nissan 720 2-door (US)

In 1980, US models were powered by Datsun's 2.0L carbureted L20B I4 engine, but soon after switched to the Nissan NAPS-Z engine line for 1981 (Z22S). "NAPS" was the terminology Nissan used to describe their pollution control technology as a result of emission regulation laws having been enacted in Japan, starting in 1975. In the Middle East, it was powered by Datsun's 1.8 L carbureted L18 engine. The 1981–1982 models used the Z22 carbureted 2.2 L engine and an optional SD22 diesel of the same displacement. In mid-1983, Nissan introduced the Z24 2.4 liter twin spark four-cylinder engine, producing 77 kW (103 hp; 104 PS), 2.3 L SD23 OHV diesel Inline-4, and the SD25 diesel.

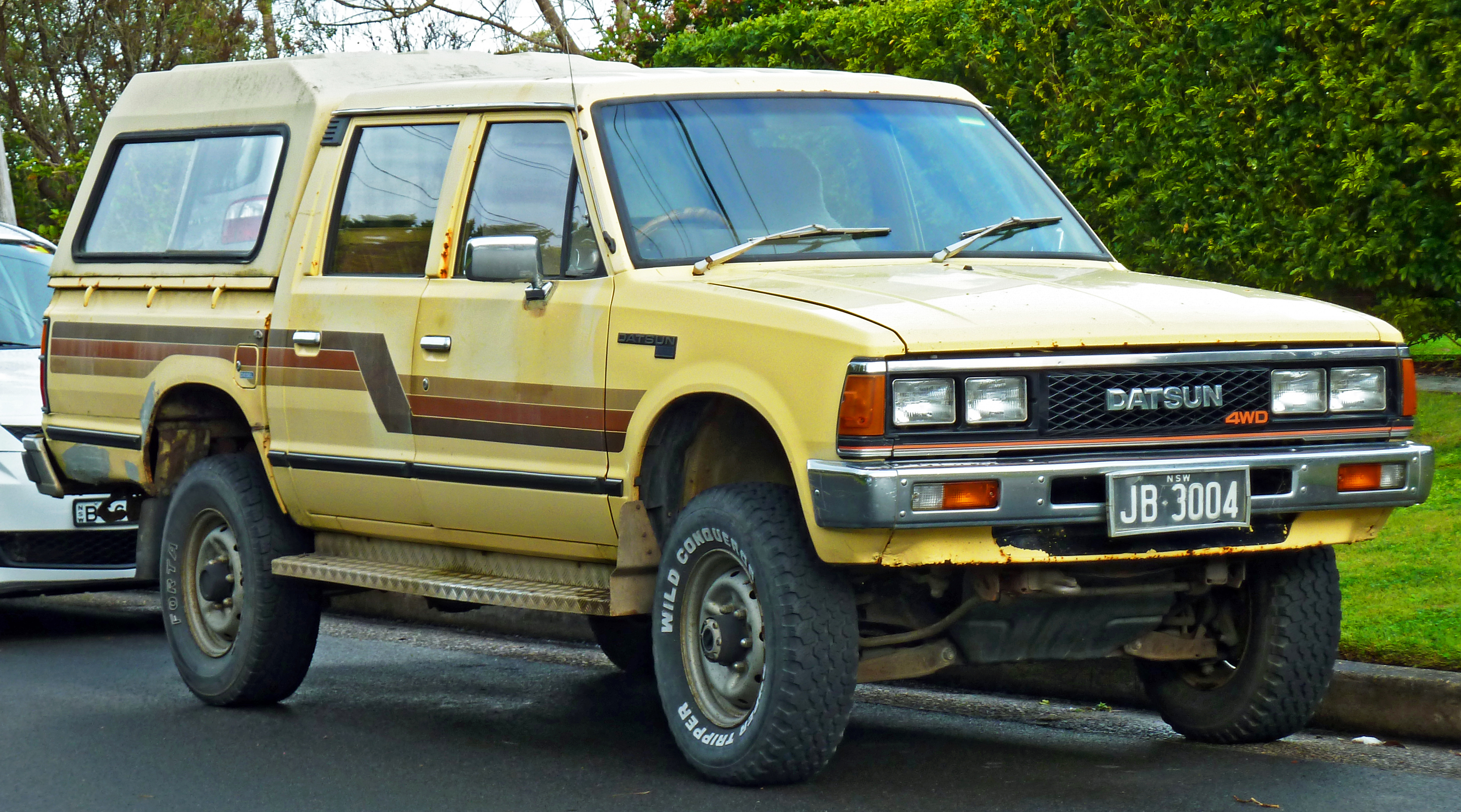
1983–84 Datsun 720 crew cab

The diesel engines were sourced from the Nissan Diesel division, which Nissan Motors acquired in 1960. This dominated 720 sales in many markets and was also available in combination with 4WD. In the American market, the diesel engine was only available in the 2WD 720 (from 1982 to 1985). The Z24 was upgraded to Z24i single-point fuel-injection for some 1986 ST models. The rest of the world had versions with the smaller 1.5 L J15, 1.6 L J16 or 1.8 L L18 carbureted engines. The 720 Series was never available with any of the Z22E or Z20E multi-port fuel injected engines.

=== North America ===
In the US, the 720 came in regular cab and "King Cab" models, with regular and long bed options with standard (GL), deluxe (DX), and "sport truck" (ST) trim packages, all of which had two doors. In addition, from 1984 to 1986 a covered utility body style like that of the first generation Toyota 4Runner was available as an aftermarket conversion by a company called Matrix3 called the Bushmaster. The Datsun 720 was available in both 2WD and 4WD configurations, the latter having a divorced transfer case. The long wheelbase 2WD trucks (King Cab, short bed, and regular cab, long bed) had a two-piece driveshaft with a center support bearing. The dome light could fold rearward, to provide illumination to the bed.

The 720 was assembled in the then newly built Smyrna, Tennessee, plant from the 1983.5 model year until 1986. However, Nissan of Mexico continued to build the pickup until 1991, 1992 being its last official model year. They were exported to the whole of Latin America.

The 1980 to 1983 models were called the "Datsun 720". They had single wall beds with outside rolled lips and rope ties, two faux hood vents (some had real vents), and tail lights on the lower rear valance (similar to the 620). These vehicles were badged with a small Datsun logo on the driver's side of the grille, a raised plastic Datsun badge on the front fenders, a large Datsun embossed on the rear tailgate, as well as Datsun stickers on the bottom left of the tailgate, and model designation on the right. The owner's manual and service manuals retained the Datsun name.

For a limited period, 1984 models built in the US had the single wall beds with rope ties, yet used tail lights on the rear bed corners with amber turn signals over the red stop/tail lights while the backup lights remained under the tailgate. These "in-between" models were a combination of Datsun and Nissan badging, with Nissan replacing Datsun in similar fashion to the earlier models, but incorporated a "Datsun by Nissan" plastic trim piece on the front fenders, and "Datsun by Nissan" stickers on the tailgate. The late model trucks produced from 1983.5 to 1986 used double wall, smooth sided beds, with revised tail lights on the corners which resembled those on Chevrolet/GMC S-Series trucks. The badging was exclusively Nissan (going along with Nissan's rebranding and conversion of 1,100 Datsun dealerships to Nissan dealerships), with the name officially being "Nissan 720", which is found in the owner's manual, service manual, and literature from the period.

==== Lil' Hustler ====
This was a continuation of the Lil' Hustler line from the 620 generation. It was a bare-bones truck that was only available as a regular cab with a 1.8 m (6 ft) bed, and was discontinued after 1982, although the 1983 model year did have the Hustler logo. Canadian models had a 3 spoke/3 horn button steering wheel with a round central "Datsun" horn button.

==== MPG ====
Unlike the GL, the MPG model of the Nissan 720 was a stripped-down version of the truck made to improve fuel economy. Unlike the others, it had only a driver side mirror, a single walled bed, a vinyl bench seat, and other bare bones accommodations. What really set this model apart was its drivetrain. It featured the 2.0L Z20 motor that was fed by a carburetor. Its compression ratio was at a high 9.4:1, and produced 95 hp (71 kW) and 112 lb⋅ft (152 N⋅m) of torque. It was able to do this because it featured a knock sensor that would retard the timing by about 10 degrees to prevent the engine from knocking. This resulted in excellent fuel economy but at the cost of emissions. For that reason this truck was not sold in the California market.

==== GL ====
The standard (GL) single cab Datsun 720 came with a front bench seat made of single color non-patterned cloth and leather in blue, black, or tan to match the interior trim color of the vehicle. It had optional factory air-conditioning and contained a simple gauge cluster with speedometer, fuel, and water temperature gauges (with blank faces in place of the tachometer and clock), as well as sliding glass rear window. A radio and cruise control were options installed by the dealership. These vehicles came in long bed, short bed, or cab-and-chassis styles with the later having a "heavy duty" option of dual rear wheels.

==== DX ====
The 2WD Deluxe model came with front bench seats of varying patterns to match the door trim and interior in blue, black or tan. 4WD models had two bucket-style seats, and incorporated a center console with voltmeter and oil pressure gauges. Both drivetrain options had single and King Cab variants. These models came with factory air conditioning, an AM-FM radio of two different types, a tachometer and/or a clock in the gauge cluster, an option of either rear sliding windows or single-pane window with defroster, as well as optional cruise control. Beds both long and short were available. In addition, there were roll-bar and bumper-brush guard options for the 4WD variant that were installed by the dealership with mounting points for off-road and fog lights. Switches for these were placed in the center console below (1980 to pre-1983.5) and above (Post 1983.5 to 1986) the voltmeter and oil pressure gauges.

==== XE ====
The 2WD Luxury model came only in king cab variants and featured several standard and unique features. For the exterior, it came with a two tone paint job, chrome bumpers, mirrors and grille. It also had Nissan brand hexagonal hubcaps, whitewall tires, and sun roof. For the interior, this top-of-the-line model came with full carpeting, bucket seats, tachometer, quartz clock, intermittent wipers, center console, and woodgrain accents on the dash and door. Like the other trucks, it was powered by the Z24 and offered both a 5-speed manual or 3-speed automatic.

==== ST ====
The 2WD and 4WD Sport Truck package came with factory air-conditioning as well as the clock and tachometer in the cluster as standard with exclusive gradient-patterned bucket seats for both drivetrains (with the 4WD versions offering the center console and gauges of the DX model, and the 2WD having center console storage in place of the transfer case lever), as well as King Cab variants. It had similar radio, back-glass, cruise control, and roll-bar/brush guard options as the DX trim. The sport truck package also was the only package with standard power windows and locks (all other packages only received manual locks and windows), as well as a tilting sunroof. ST stickers were placed on the end of the rear quarter panels. Ironically, the ST package had no performance modifications, however in the 1986 model year it had an optional Z24i single-port fuel injected engine.

==== Bushmaster ====
From 1984 to 1986 a covered utility body style was available in the US called the Bushmaster. The Bushmaster was an aftermarket/dealer conversion done by the Matrix3 company. It was created from the King Cab 4WD model, welding the cab and bed of the truck together along with a custom bed topper which increased the height of the whole vehicle. The interior was completely carpeted, and incorporated a rear folding bench seat similar to the first generation Toyota 4Runner. This option is exceedingly rare, and is considered a predecessor to the Nissan Pathfinder.

=== Europe ===
The United Kingdom only received the longer wheelbase, as a standard bed 1-Tonner with the L18 engine or as the four-wheel drive 2.2-litre King Cab with 96 hp (72 kW; 97 PS). Australia only received the SD25 and the Z22S.

In most European markets, the 720 was sold as the Datsun PickUp (regular cab) or Datsun King Cab. As elsewhere in the world, the "Nissan" name gradually replaced Datsun in 1983 and 1984. The SD22 diesel in European trim produces 64 PS (47 kW; 63 hp) while the 1.8-liter L18-engined versions offered 80 PS (59 kW; 79 hp).

Fitted with a 1.6-liter engine, this was the first vehicle to emerge from Nissan/TEOKAR's new assembly plant in Volos, Greece, in February 1980.

=== Model codes ===
Engine	1471 cc J15 I4	1567 cc J16 I4	1595 cc Z16 I4	1751 cc J18 I4	1770 cc L18 I4	1770 cc Z18 I4	1952 cc L20B I4	1952 cc Z20S I4	2188 cc Z22S I4	2389 cc Z24 I4 2389 cc Z24i I4	2164 cc SD22 I4	2289 cc SD23 I4	2488 cc SD25 I4
Power (JDM)	–	59 kW (79 hp; 80 PS)	82 PS (60 kW)	–	70 kW (94 hp; 95 PS)	66 kW (89 hp; 90 PS)	–	–	–	–	48 kW (64 hp; 65 PS)	54 kW (72 hp; 73 PS)	–
Power (US)	–	–	–	–	–	–	72 kW (97 hp; 98 PS)	72 kW (97 hp; 98 PS)	73 kW (98 hp; 99 PS)	77 kW (103 hp; 104 PS); 106 hp (79 kW)	45 kW (61 hp; 62 PS)	–	52 kW (70 hp; 71 PS)
Power (Europe)	–	51 kW (68 hp; 69 PS)	–	–	59 kW (79 hp; 80 PS)		–	–	71 kW (96 hp; 97 PS)	–	47 kW (63 hp; 64 PS)	50 kW (67 hp; 68 PS)	53 kW (71 hp; 72 PS)
Power (others)		47 kW (63 hp; 64 PS)		57 kW (77 hp; 78 PS)									
SWB		720	C720	T720	P720	D720	H720	F720	M720	N720	S720	A720	J720
SWB 4WD	–	–		–	PY720	DY720	HY720	–	MY720	NY720	SY720	–	JY720
LWB		G720/U720	CG720	TG720	PG720	DG720	HG720	FG720		NG720	SG720	AG720	JG720
LWB 4WD	–	–		–	PGY720	DGY720	HGY720	–	MGY720/UMY720	NGY720	SGY720	AGY720	JGY720/UJY720
Leading letter K is for King Cab, U for the Double Cab (on late models this replaced the "G" for long wheelbase), R for the refrigerated box truck version, and E for the twin-wheel version. L after the first letter signifies left-hand drive.

== Nissan D21 ==
Nissan D21
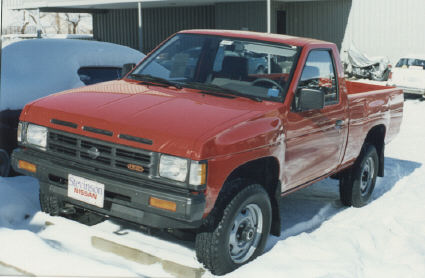
- 1990 Nissan Hardbody

Overview
- Manufacturer: Nissan
- Also called: Nissan Datsun (Japan); Nissan Big M (Thailand); Nissan Camiones (Mexico, 1993–2008); Nissan D21 (Chile); Nissan Fiera (Peru); Nissan Hardbody; Nissan King Cab; Nissan Navara; Nissan Pickup; Nissan Power Eagle (Philippines); Nissan Sani (South Africa); Sanyou CY1020 (China); Sanyou CY6500 (China); Zhengzhou-Nissan PickUp D21 (China)
- Production: US/CDN: November 1985 – 1997; MEX: 1993–2008; PRC: April 1995 – January 1999; THA: 1986–1998; PHL: 1987–1998
- Assembly: Nissan Shatai, Kanda, Fukuoka, Japan; Smyrna, Tennessee, U.S.; Volos, Greece (TEOKAR); Cuernavaca, Mexico; Zhengzhou, Henan, People's Republic of China; Changchun-Sammitr Motor Co, Changchun, People's Republic of China; Samut Prakan, Thailand; Makati, Philippines (UMC); Trentham, New Zealand (contract assembled by General Motors); Auckland New Zealand (by Nissan NZ Wiri); South Africa: Rosslyn, Gauteng (NSA)
- Designer: Tom Semple (1982)

Body and chassis
- Class: Compact pickup truck (1985–1997)
- Body style: 2-door truck; 2-door king cab truck
- Layout: FR layout / F4 layout
- Related: Nissan Pathfinder

Powertrain
- Engine: 1.6 L Z16 I4; 1.6 L NA16 I4; 1.8 L Z18 I4; 2.0 L NA20 I4; 2.0 L Z20 I4; 2.4 L Z24 I4; 2.4 L KA24E I4 (1990–1997); 3.0 L VG30i V6 (1986–1989); 3.0 L VG30E V6 (1990–1997); 2.5 L BD25 I4 diesel; 2.3 L TD23 I4 diesel (1987–1992); 2.5 L TD25 I4 diesel (1988–1996); 2.7 L TD27 I4 diesel (1988–1996); 2.2 L CA488 I4 (1992–2001) (China)
- Transmission: 3-speed automatic; 4-speed automatic; 4-speed manual; 5-speed manual

Dimensions
- Wheelbase: 104.3 in (2,649 mm); 116.1 in (2,949 mm)
- Length: 174.6 in (4,435 mm); 190 in (4,826.0 mm); 195.5 in (4,966 mm)
- Width: 65 in (1,651.0 mm); 1986–1992 & 1995–97: 66.5 in (1,689 mm); 1993–1997: 66.7 in (1,694 mm); 1993–1997: 67.1 in (1,704 mm)
- Height: 62.4 in (1,585 mm); 62 in (1,574.8 mm); 66.7 in (1,694 mm); 67.1 in (1,704 mm)
- Curb weight: 3,602 lb (1,634 kg)

Chronology
- Predecessor: Datsun truck
- Successor: Nissan Frontier

The D21 generation was the successor to the Datsun 720, sold as the Nissan Datsun truck in Japan. The name Navara was used in some markets such as Australia.

Unlike previous generations, this model was available worldwide in two body styles. The "A" body was designed in Japan, and was available in single or dual cab variants, while the "S" body King Cab was designed in the United States, at Nissan's styling studios in San Diego, California. Each version had unique front styling, with the American version having a different hood, and wider flared front guards. In a few countries, such as Australia, both versions were sold. This was also assembled in Greece for the local market, where it was marketed as the Nissan Pickup and King Cab.

In North America, the company used the name "Datsun" from model years 1980 to 1984 then renamed itself "Nissan" beginning with the 1985 model year line of trucks and cars alike. Nonetheless, the Nissan pickups continued to be marketed in the Japanese market as the "Nissan Datsun". The D21 series were called Nissan Hardbody in the United States. "Hardbody" refers to the truck's double-wall bed and overall styling. The Hardbody was produced for the US market from November 1985 until 1997, and were direct competition to the Toyota compact pickup. The move from the 720 to the D21 Nissan series body style changed in January 1986 for the 1986½ model year so the new D21 and later Hardbody can easily be distinguished from the earlier 720 body style by its two large headlights rather than four smaller lights and a less boxy, more aggressive appearance. The Nissan Pathfinder was derived from the hardbody truck and started in the same model year with chassis code WD21.

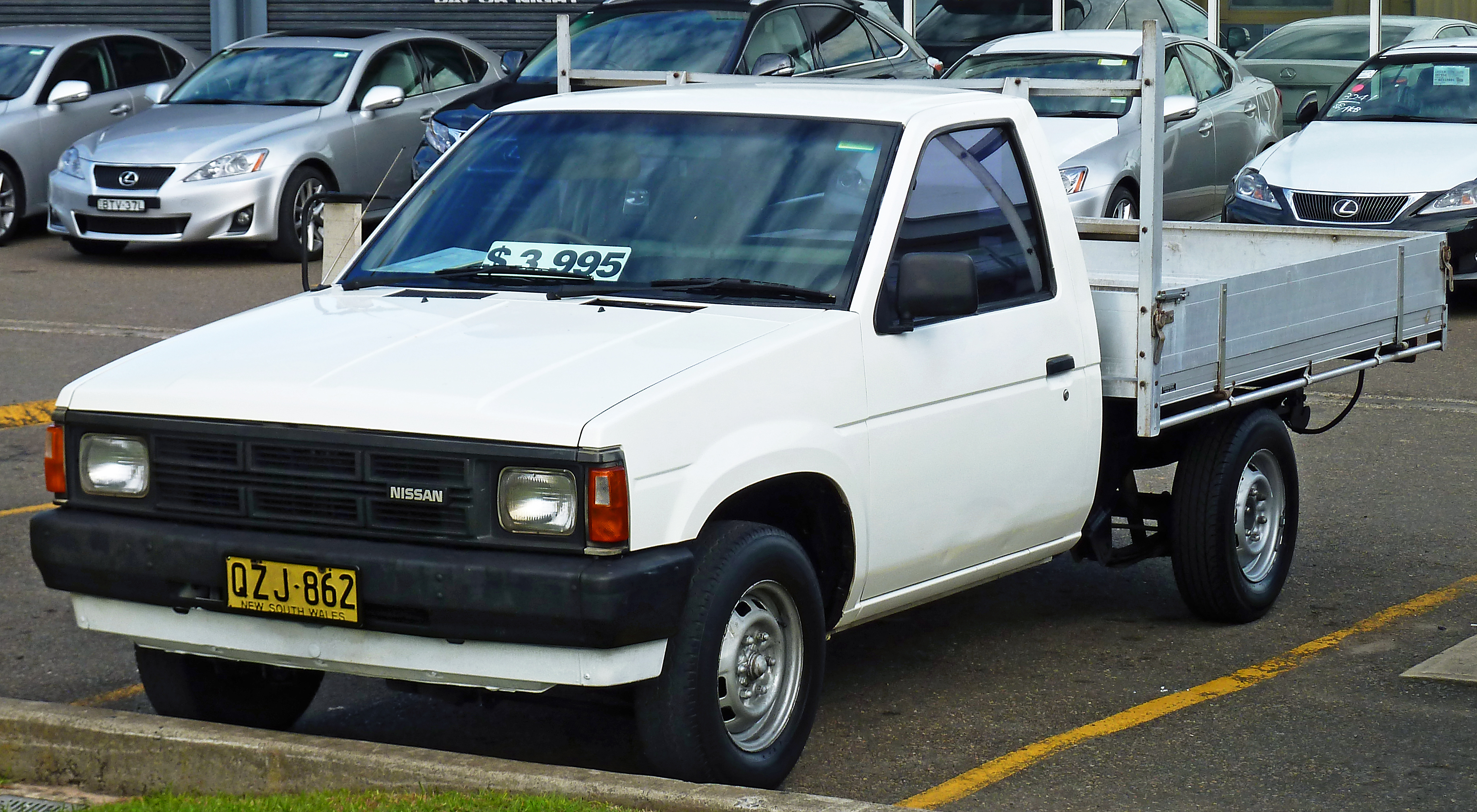
1989 Nissan Navara (D21) DX 2-door cab chassis (Australia)

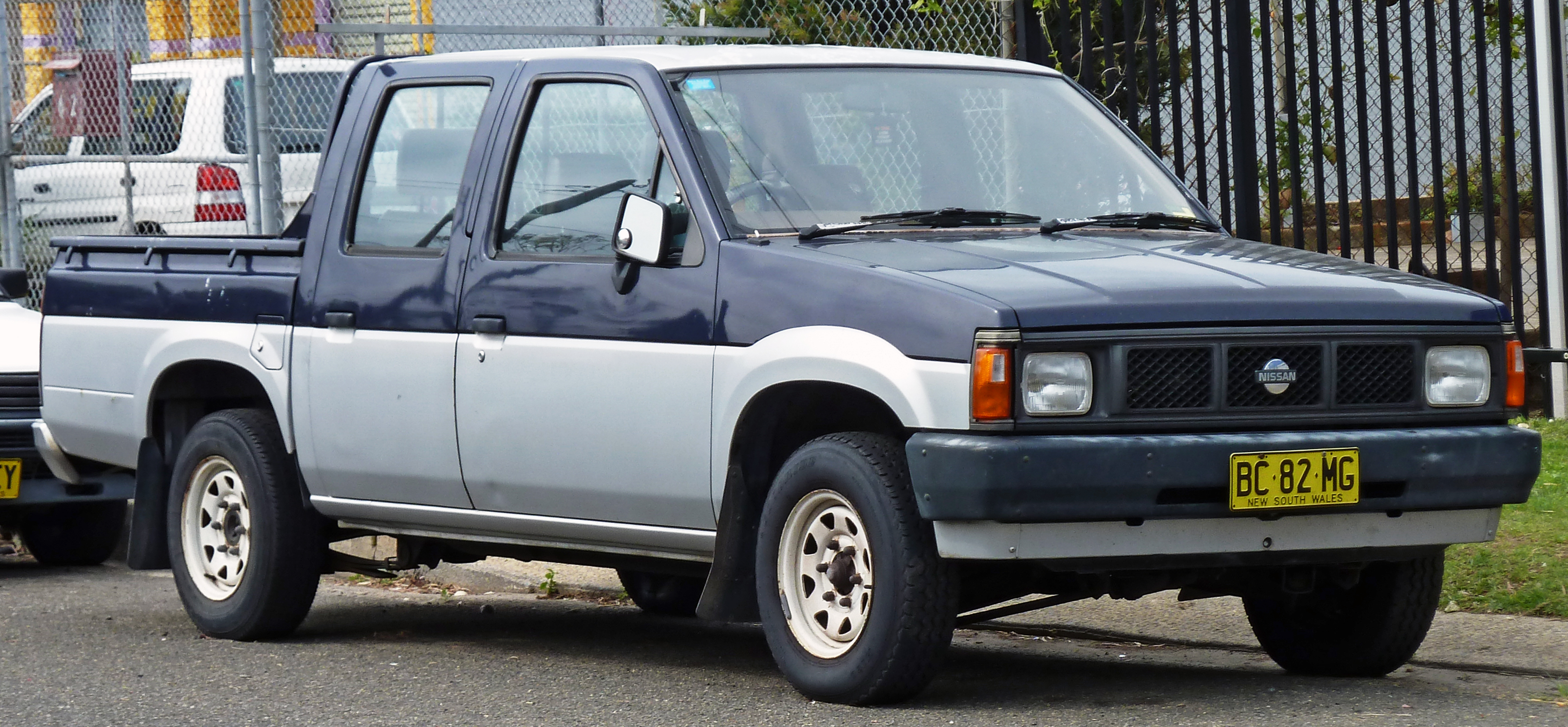
1989 Nissan Navara (D21) 4-door utility (Australia)

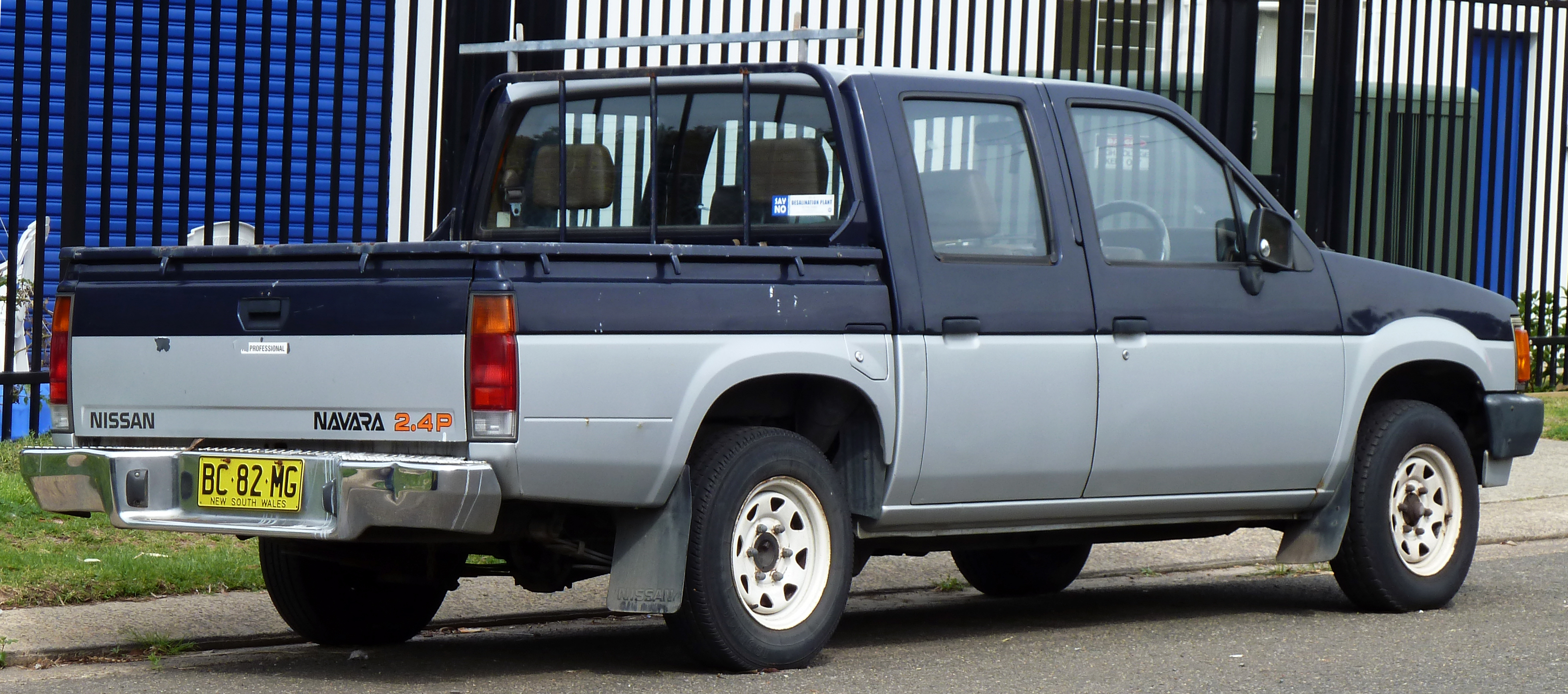
1989 Nissan Navara (D21) 4-door utility (Australia)

In the US, the Hardbody cab styles were 'Standard' and 'King' (also known as 'Extended'). Bed lengths were 'standard' 6-foot (2 m) and 'long' seven-foot. International markets also received the 'Crew Cab' (four-door) version with a short four and a half-foot bed.

Versions sold outside of North America came with a host of typically more economical engines, ranging from 1.6-litre gasoline fours up to a 2.7-litre diesel four-cylinder, including the SD25 and TD25 diesel engines. Four-cylinder and V6 engines were available.

In North America, the 2.4-litre four-cylinder Z24i engine was used until 1989 and produced 79 kW (106 hp; 107 PS) in US trim. For many markets a carburetted version of the Z24 was available, usually without much in the way of emissions controls. This model produces 74 kW (100 hp; 101 PS) at 4,800 rpm. For North America, the Z24 was replaced for the 1990 model year by the KA24E of similar displacement: a SOHC engine of respectable performance. Used in the 1990-1997 models, this engine featured a new three-valve-per-cylinder head and produces 100 kW (134 hp; 136 PS), receiving the same engine configuration as the 240SX of the same year, but with slightly less power. The six-cylinder 3.0-litre VG30i (early years) or VG30E (later years) engine increased power and torque figures modestly. This was the only engine option for the one-tonne long bed truck. The V6 was no longer available in the US starting with the 1996 model year because Nissan was unable to meet the requirements of the new OBD-II emissions law in time.

Five-speed, including overdrive, manual transmissions were the most common, but an automatic transmission was an available option. Both 2WD and 4WD versions were made in quantity. A limited slip differential was standard on the top 'SE' trim variants. Some automatic 2WD models had a column shifter.

Major options included air conditioning, larger wheels/tires, sliding rear window, stereo, and rear bumper. There were several trims available including base, XE, and top-of-the-line SE. The XE could be ordered with a 'value package' starting in 1994 which included air conditioning, power mirrors, alloy wheels, and chrome on body trim such as the mirrors and bumpers. The SE was better equipped and could be ordered with the "sport power package" with sunroof, power windows, locks, and mirrors, air conditioning and special 15x8 inch "Robot" alloy wheels.

In 1992, Nissan had a crossover year in which the 1993 model year (mid-1992 to mid-1993 calendar year) had the dashboard of the 1986½–1992 model years with a slightly refreshed body appearance as well as some small interior changes and a revised instrument panel. This model used the new R-134a air conditioning refrigerant.

In 1993, for the 1994 model year in North America, the D21 received its last major refresh which would last through 1997. Changes were a new ergonomic dashboard and much improved interior.

1995 was the first model year to comply with the new US Department of Transportation "high mount brake light" regulation requiring all trucks to have a brake light in the center of the rear at the top of the cab, though a temporary light had been added to the 1994 models.

In late 1995, a driver's side airbag was added as well as compliance with the new US safety rules. Rear wheel ABS came with both 2WD and 4WD models beginning in 1990.

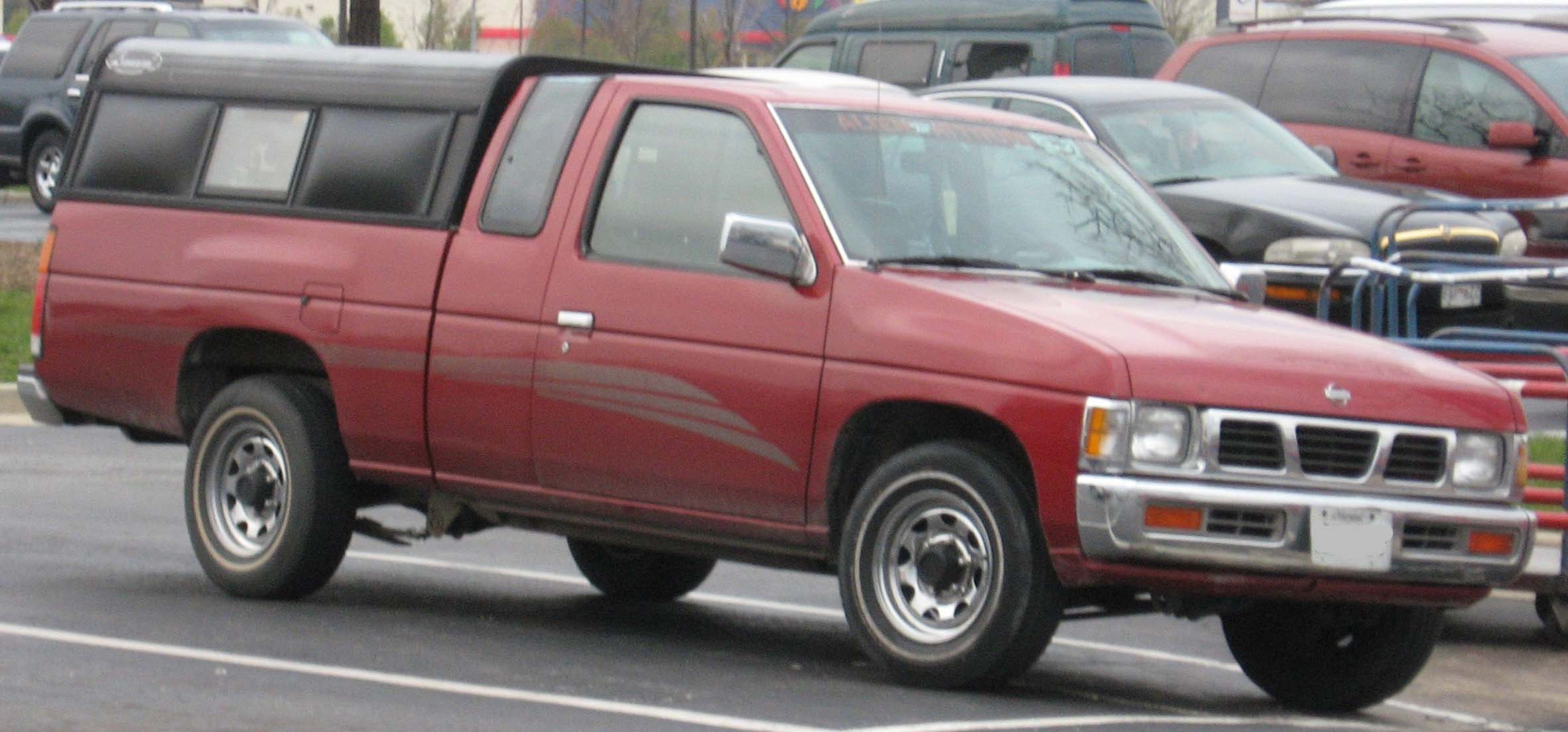
Nissan hardbody truck with updated interior, mild hood, bumper and grille refresh. (1993.5–1997)

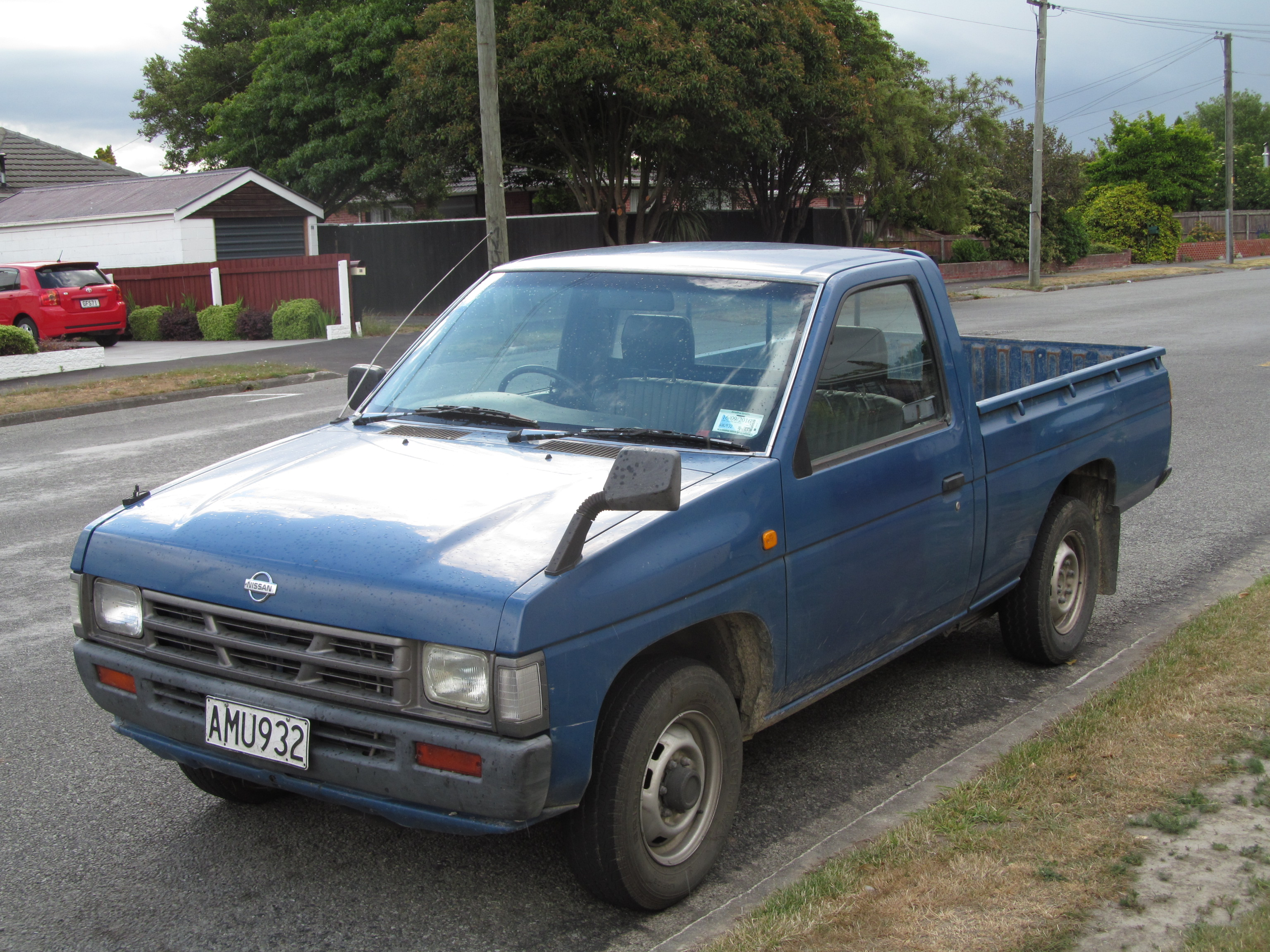
Nissan Datsun (Japan)

These Hardbody small pickup trucks sold very well worldwide, and are still often seen both on-road and off-road. The V6 engine had a timing belt that required replacement every 60,000 miles. In the US, beginning in 1997, the new "D22" was officially named, "Frontier" with the 4 cylinder engines keeping the same architecture. A newly modified "VG33" V6 was available in 1998 and ending production in the US in 2004. The new VG33E V6 had new, larger, 10 mm exhaust manifold studs in an attempt to decrease the risk of premature exhaust manifold stud failure, but still had limited success.

The D21 design was still available new in some Latin American countries, made in Mexico until the 2008 model year. In Mexico, a range of four basic variations of the D21 were sold together as the Nissan camiones (literally "Nissan trucks"). Nissan Mexicana ended production of the camiones on 15 March 2008 after 15 years of production in the Cuernavaca plant.

The Nissan D21 was sold in Venezuela until at least 2014.

Production of this model in China dates back to 1992, when Sammitr, a vehicle assembler of Thai origin, established a joint venture subsidiary in Changchun China: Changchun Sammitr (Sanyou in Chinese) Motor Co. Ltd., to produce parts and accessories. for motor vehicles, managing to produce under license the Pick-Up D21 under the name Sanyou CY1020 in Pick-Up version, and a van derived from it, the Sanyou CY6500. The CY1020 pickup was on sale for CN¥ 70,000, with a FAW CA488 engine, wheelbase 2950mm, dimensions 4750x 1650x 1560mm, and the CY6500 station wagon was on sale for CN¥ 72,000, had a 2210cc CA488 engine from the manufacturer local FAW. Its wheelbase is 2950 mm and measures (LxWxH) 5050 × 1 1650x 1670 mm. For both models, although Nissan bodies brought in CKD format from Thailand were used, the chassis was of the FAW CA1021U2 model. The manufacture of the Pick-Up extends from 1992 to 2001, and the van derived from it approximately from 1999 to 2001. The first purely local models of Nissan D21 series pickup trucks, manufactured by the joint venture established in 1993 between China's Dongfeng Motor Co., Ltd. and Japan's Nissan Motor Co, an alliance called Zhengzhou Nissan Automobile Co., Ltd. They first began leaving the Zhengzhou production line in April 1995, remaining in production for a period of six years.
