= Group purchasing organization =

Type of business consortium

In the United States, a group purchasing organization (GPO) is an entity that is created to leverage the purchasing power of a group of businesses to obtain discounts from vendors based on the collective buying power of the GPO members.

Many GPOs are funded by administrative fees which are paid by the vendors that GPOs oversee. Some GPOs are funded by fees paid by the buying members. Some GPOs are funded by a combination of both of these methods. These fees can be set as a percentage of the purchase or set as an annual flat rate. Some GPOs set mandatory participation levels for their members, while others are completely voluntary. Members participate based on their purchasing needs and their level of confidence in what should be competitive pricing negotiated by their GPOs.

Group purchasing is used in many industries to purchase raw materials and supplies, but it is especially common practice in the grocery industry, health care, electronics, industrial manufacturing and agricultural industries. In recent years, group purchasing has begun to take root in the nonprofit community. Group purchasing amongst nonprofits is still relatively new, but is quickly becoming common place as these also aim to find ways to reduce overhead expenses. In the healthcare field, GPOs have most commonly been accessed by acute care organizations, but non-profit Community Clinics and Health Centers throughout the U.S. have also been engaging in group purchasing.

== History ==
The first healthcare GPO was established in 1910 by the Hospital Bureau of New York. For many decades, healthcare GPOs grew slowly in number, to only 10 in 1962.

Medicare and Medicaid stimulated growth in the number of GPOs to 40 in 1974. That number tripled between 1974 and 1977. The institution of the Medicare Prospective Payment System (PPS) in 1983 focused greater scrutiny on costs and fostered further rapid GPO expansion. In 1986, Congress granted GPOs in healthcare "Safe Harbor" from federal anti-kickback statutes after successful lobbying efforts. By 2007, there were hundreds of healthcare GPOs, "affiliates" and cooperatives in the United States that were availing themselves of substantial revenues obtained from vendors in the form of administrative fees, or "remuneration". 96 percent of all acute-care hospitals and 98 percent of all community hospitals held at least one GPO membership. Importantly, 97 percent of all not-for-profit, non-governmental hospitals participated in some form of group purchasing.

With healthcare costs rising sharply in the early 1980s, the federal government revised Medicare from a system of fee-for-service (FFS) payments to PPS, under which hospitals receive a fixed amount for each patient with a given diagnosis. Other insurers also limited what hospitals could charge. The result was a financial squeeze on hospitals, compelling them to seek new ways to manage their costs.

In specifically exempting GPOs from the Federal Anti-Kickback Law, many healthcare providers interpreted the act as an encouragement to the expansion of GPOs. Congress did not specify any limit on contract administration fees, but required the United States Department of Health and Human Services (HHS) to monitor such fees for possible abuse – particularly with respect to fees in excess of 3.0 percent.

In 1991, HHS promulgated ten safe harbor regulations, effective 29 July 1991, reflecting Congress's intent to permit contract administration fees and creating the additional safeguard that GPOs inform members of administrative fees in excess of 3.0 percent. Despite these safeguards, the Government Accounting Office (now the Government Accountability Office, GAO) published a study in 2002 indicating that GPOs did not always in fact reduce the cost of supplies and equipment for hospitals, but in some cases increased these costs by as much as 37%. Further examining the practices of GPOs, the Federal Trade Commission (FTC) clarified that "safety zone thresholds do not prevent and should not be appropriately read as preventing antitrust challenges to any of the alleged anticompetitive contracting practices..." of GPOs.

In 2002, the Senate Judiciary Committee's Antitrust Subcommittee imposed stricter standards on GPOs in healthcare, requiring the adoption of a Code of Conduct to which GPOs must subscribe.

Critics of GPOs charge that, as long as GPOs receive fees from the vendors they are charged with policing, the industry has anti-competitive contracting potential that should be subjected to further scrutiny and/or regulation.

== Types and contexts ==
=== Vertical-market GPOs ===
A vertical GPO assists companies and organizations within a specific industry or market segment.

==== Healthcare GPOs ====
A healthcare group purchasing organization (GPO) assists in promoting quality healthcare relief and assists diverse providers in effectively managing expenses. A GPO aggregates the purchasing volume of its members for various goods and services and develops contracts with suppliers through which members may buy at group price and terms if they choose to. GPOs typically provide contracted discounts on medical supplies, nutrition, pharmacy and laboratory. Some of the large GPOs have expanded contract portfolios to also offer discounts on office supplies and non-medical related services.

A GPO's earnings come from an "Administrative" fee. GPOs may collect an "Administrative" fee up to 3.0% of all sales volumes from the vendors that they negotiate a contract from, upon selling products to their member hospitals. These fees do not influence the prices negotiated. They are used to cover the GPO's operating expenses. If there is a remainder it is distributed back to the GPO owners; thus, GPO owners achieve cost-savings on the goods they choose to buy through group contracts, and also receive distributions back from the GPO. General GPO members may also receive some fee share as part of their member agreement, though this practice is no longer typical; thus the primary benefit to a GPO member is the access to discounted pricing.

GPOs submit that their services allow for improved operating margins for healthcare providers, and that members enjoy value added benefits like clinical support, benchmarking data, supply chain support and comprehensive portfolios of products and services to address specific needs.

GPOs vary in their strategy for negotiating discounts with suppliers - from requiring that its members not join other GPOs (exclusivity) to requiring compliance to awarding single source contracts. As the healthcare industry becomes saturated with GPOs, pricing is one way for GPOs to bring in new members or convince members of another GPO to switch. A 2009 report suggested that US hospitals make about 72% of their purchases using GPO contracts.

==== Foodservice or grocery GPOs ====
A foodservice or grocery GPO focuses exclusively on the $600 billion foodservice marketplace, including food and food-related purchasing for multi-unit foodservice operators, contract negotiation and supply chain services. These negotiations are made with supplier/manufacturing agreements and purchasing contracts. Categories for grocery purchases include poultry, fresh produce, frozen food products, fresh and frozen meats, candy and snacks, dairy and bakery, dry goods, disposables and beverages.

==== Hospitality GPOs ====
A hospitality GPO focuses on solving procurement and sourcing concerns for hotels or vacation rentals by aggregating the demand for products and services used to furnish and stock guest units and operate hospitality businesses, delivering deep savings on furnishings, appliances, electronics, software, home goods, kitchen, and bed and bath products for its members. GPOs in the hospitality sector provide not only cost savings but also essential services like menu innovation and operational support, which are critical for enhancing guest satisfaction and efficiency.

==== Industrial manufacturing GPOs ====
A manufacturers' GPO succeeds in solving procurement and sourcing concerns by aggregating the demand for products and services used in the manufacturing and production process and delivering deep savings on raw materials, services and components by issuing rebates, discounts, and preferred pricing to its members. The combined buying power helps manufacturers save money on their purchases and more effectively compete against the largest global manufacturers. Savings can be delivered in two separate ways in GPOs. First, discounts and rebates are automatic savings, which are pre-negotiated. Then, manufacturers are also allowed to negotiate improved pricing privately with an endorsed list of suppliers.

==== Legal GPOs ====
A buying group for the law industry is dedicated to driving down costs for the legal community by assembling a grouping of best-in-class suppliers that are designed to address many of the key procurement needs of law firms of all sizes. Members enjoy automatic savings through discounts and rebates, which are pre-negotiated. Then, law firms are also allowed to negotiate improved pricing privately with an endorsed list of suppliers.

==== Non-profit GPOs ====
Non-profit GPOs are similar to regular GPOs, but they are typically made of up a board of non-profit, community based organizations working together to help lower their costs.

Many of the large health-care GPOs (often working with non-profit hospitals) are also expanding into the nonprofit market by creating divisions to service, for example, nonprofits in the human services sector.

=== Horizontal-market GPOs ===
Whereas a vertical GPO assists organizations in specific industries, such as health care, food service, legal, dairy, and industrial manufacturing, a horizontal GPO assists companies across a broad spectrum of industries. Horizontal market GPO members exist in many different industries, but they purchase a lot of the same goods and services to build their products and run their companies.

==== Non-strategic, or indirect spend horizontal market GPOs ====
A horizontal indirect spend GPO succeeds in reducing procurement costs by aggregating the demand for non-strategic, or indirect cost supplies and services used by a broad horizontal market spectrum of member client organizations by consolidating purchasing power and establishing contracts to achieve preferred pricing, terms, and service standards.

The resulting combined buying power helps the usually mid-size and larger member client organizations save money on their purchases of categories such as temporary labor services, office products, safety supplies, office equipment, packaging supplies, uniform and laundry services, pest control, and expedited parcel delivery. The consolidation of purchasing effort with the GPO also allows member clients savings from reduced staffing overhead costs. According to an analysis by SpendMatters, from an adoption perspective, 15-20% of the Fortune 1000 currently use buying consortiums and 85% of the time, they're seeing 10%+ of savings in the categories in which they put through a consortium model.

Most of the indirect spend buying groups in the UK are run by Independent Buyers Ltd who run schemes for several trade associations.

The suppliers to this type of GPO offer preferred pricing, terms, and service standards because they experience lower overall selling expenses and the increased volume usually associated with the addition of a single very large customer.

Savings provided by a horizontal GPO are delivered on the purchases each member client makes directly with the GPO contracted supplier due to best-in-class contracts in which all members receive the same price and service. Member client staff can focus on strategic sourcing activities while confidently knowing that the non-strategic sourcing is well managed within best-in-class contracts.

== See also ==
- Collective buying power
- Group buy
- Horizontal market
- Prescription drug purchasing pool
- Tuangou
- Vertical market
