= Non-mainstream pooled investment vehicle =

A non-mainstream pooled investment vehicle (NMPI) is a form of investment fund in the UK. It is typically used as a form of fund for alternative investments, which include illiquid assets such as forestry, property or loans. Often NMPIs will have less than £100M of assets under administration. NMPIs are not listed and may be closed-ended or open-ended.

== Regulatory status ==
An NMPI may be regulated or unregulated, but the fund manager itself must still be regulated to operate in the UK. Non-Mainstream Pooled Investment (NMPI) is a new term for Unregulated Collective Investment Schemes (UCIS), but NMPI is wider in definition.

In the cases where they are unregulated, they are not subject to the Financial Conduct Authority (FCA) rules on investment powers, the manner in which they are run, the type of assets that they can invest in, or what information they must disclose to the investors. In addition, investors are not protected by the Financial Services Compensation Scheme (FSCS) if things go wrong, and as such these are considered to be high-risk investments.

== Promotion and suitability ==
The promotion of an NMPI is restricted. NMPIs cannot be marketed in a way that is likely to be received by a retail client, although there are exemptions for High Net Worth individuals and Sophisticated Investors.

NMPIs can be popular for investors looking to invest in alternative assets, which may be uncorrelated due to the lack of a listing at the fund level.
