= Sammitr =

Thai manufacturing company

Sammitr Group Holding Co., Ltd.
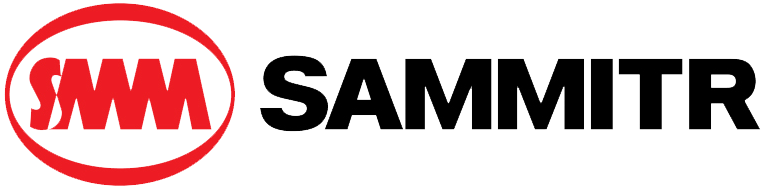
- Company type: Privately held company
- Industry: Car parts manufacturing; Automotive industry
- Founded: 1956
- Headquarters: Thailand
- Key people: Chao Posirisuk, CEO
- Products: Auto parts
- Subsidiaries: Sammitr Motors Manufacturing; Sammitr Green Power; Sammitr Autopart
- Website: https://www.sammitrgroup.com; https://www.sammitr.com

Sammitr Group (SMM) (stylized in all caps) (Thai: กลุ่มบริษัทสามมิตร) is a Thai manufacturing company. It is a manufacturer of leaf springs, passenger vehicles, truck body parts, molds, jigs and fixtures for auto makers. Additionally, it is also the manufacturer for dump trucks, trailers, semi-trailers, specially designed trucks, steel canopies, and accessories for pick-up trucks later on.

The company was founded in 1959. Its headquarters is located in Om Noi, Thailand. The company also have overseas manufacturing facilities in Changchun and Nanjing, China. Sammitr Group is a privately held, family-owned company, with the majority of shares held by the current CEO, Chao Posirisuk.
