= Nissan Motor Philippines =

Filipino subsidiary company

Nissan Philippines, Inc.
- Type: Subsidiary
- Founded: 2013; 13 years ago (as Nissan Philippines, Inc.)
- Headquarters: 9th Floor Ecoprime Building, 32nd Street corner 9th Avenue, Bonifacio Global City, Taguig, Philippines
- Key people: Yasuhisa Masuda (president)
- Products: Automobiles
- Parent: Nissan Motor Company
- Website: nissan.ph

The Nissan Philippines, Inc. is a joint venture between Nissan Motor Company, Universal Motors Corporation and Yulon Philippines Investment Co. Ltd. for the import and distribution of Nissan automobiles, multi-purpose vehicles (MPV) and sport utility vehicles (SUV) in the Philippines.

== History ==
Nissan Motor Company entered the Philippine market in 1969 with the appointment of Universal Motors Corporation (UMC) as the authorized assembler and distributor of Datsun cars and pickups. UMC started assembling vehicles in their Pasong Tamo, Makati facility. Included in the vehicles assembled were the Datsun 620 pick up with the 1.5 L J15 I4 engine. Later, it brought in the Datsun 720 Double Cab pick-up with the carbureted L20B I4. It also did pre-delivery inspection on the Nissan Cedric (Series 130, also called the Datsun 2400 Super Six), the Nissan Laurel and the Nissan Bluebird.

In 1983, Nissan Motor Company established Pilipinas Nissan, Inc. (PNI), a joint-venture with Marubeni, to assemble and distribute Nissan passenger cars. The company took over the former Volkswagen (DMG, Inc.) assembly plant in E. Rodriguez Sr. Ave., Quezon City and refitted it to meet the specifications required by Nissan Japan. The first models it assembled were the Nissan Pulsar (N12) and the Nissan Stanza (T11, known elsewhere as the Nissan Violet). By this time, UMC focused on the Nissan light commercial vehicles (SUVs and pickups). In November 1991, PNI was renamed Nissan Motor Philippines, Inc. (NMPI). In September 2000, the Yulon group acquired control of NMPI from Nissan Motor Company.

In September 2013, Nissan Motor Company reorganized its Philippine business with the establishment of Nissan Philippines, Inc. (NPI) as the sole national sales company for the Philippines, assuming direct control over the entire Philippine operations of Nissan. The new company is a joint-venture between Nissan Motor Company (51%), UMC (24.5%) and Yulon (24.5%). With the establishment of the new company, UMC and NMPI (renamed Univation Motor Philippines, Inc. in October 2014, after the Nissan reorganization) will continue as assemblers for NPI.

In January 2021, Nissan Philippines announced that it will shut down its plant in Santa Rosa, Laguna in March. Ceasing local production of the Nissan Almera in which it has been assembling in the Santa Rosa plant since 2013. Although its marketing and distribution network will still continue selling its vehicles produced in Thailand and Japan.

Nissan would be the third vehicle maker in Santa Rosa to cease operations, after Ford Motor Company in 2012 and Honda Motor Company in 2020.

Nissan has also plans for Mitsubishi Motors Philippines Corporation to produce the Navara and Terra at its plant in Santa Rosa, Laguna.

== Vehicles marketed ==
=== Current ===
- Nissan Almera (2000–2008, 2013–present) - Locally produced until 2021 then imported from Thailand
- Nissan Kicks e-Power (2022–present) - Imported from Thailand
- Nissan Livina (2008–2016, 2022–present) - Locally produced until 2016 then imported from Indonesia
- Nissan Navara (1998–present) - Locally produced until 2014 then imported from Thailand
- Nissan Navara Pro (2026–present) - Imported from China
- Nissan Patrol (1961–present) - Locally produced until 2018 then imported from Japan
- Nissan Primera (2026–present) - Imported from China
- Nissan Terra (2018–present) - Imported from China
- Nissan Urvan (1992–present) - Locally produced until 2015 then imported from Japan
- Nissan X-Trail (2003–2022, 2026–present) - Locally produced from 2003 to 2014 then imported from Japan
- Nissan Z (2019–present) - Imported from Japan

=== Former ===
- Nissan AD Max (1997–2000) - Locally produced
- Nissan Altima (1993–1998, 2014–2019) - Locally produced from 1993 to 1998 then imported from United States from 2014 to 2019
- Nissan Bluebird (1990–1993) - Imported from Japan
- Nissan Cefiro (1991–2007) - Locally produced
- Nissan GT-R (2009–2025) - Imported from Japan
- Nissan Juke (2016–2021) - Imported from Japan
- Nissan Leaf (2021–2026) - Imported from United Kingdom until 2024 then imported from Japan
- Nissan Maxima (1987–1990) - Imported from Japan
- Nissan Murano (2006–2016) - Imported from Japan
- Nissan Power Eagle (1987–1998) - Locally produced
- Nissan Serena (2002–2012) - Locally produced
- Nissan Sentra (1987–2014) - Locally produced
- Nissan Sylphy (2014–2022) - Imported from Thailand
- Nissan Teana (2006–2014) - Imported from Thailand
- Nissan Terrano (1996–2000) - Imported from Indonesia
- Nissan Vanette (1993–2001) - Locally produced
- Nissan Verita (2000–2007) - Imported from Taiwan
