= Prescription drug purchasing pool =

Prescription Drug Purchasing Pools are groups of individuals, businesses, and governments that pool their purchasing power to negotiate a lower price for prescription drugs.

== List of purchasing pools ==
=== United States ===
As of February 2010, there are five operating multi-state bulk buying pools, not counting several additional variations and single state-initiatives:

- National Medicaid Pooling Initiative (NMPI) was first announced in early 2003 with four states. As of 2009 the total number of pooled states is twelve and DC. The states are Alaska, Georgia, Hawaii, Kentucky, Michigan, Minnesota, Montana, Nevada, New Hampshire, Rhode Island, New York and Tennessee as well as the District of Columbia.
- Top Dollar Program (TOP$)SM is the State Medicaid Pharmaceutical Purchasing Pool started by Provider Synergies, for Louisiana and Maryland in 2005. Delaware, Idaho, Nebraska, Pennsylvania and Wisconsin joined more recently for a total of seven participants as of April 2009.
- Sovereign States Drug Consortium (SSDC) was founded as a non-profit structure by the states of Iowa, Maine, and Vermont for Medicaid in October 2005. Iowa, Maine, Oregon, Utah, Vermont, West Virginia and Wyoming are operational members.
- Northwest Prescription Drug Consortium (NPDC) combines non-Medicaid Rx programs in Oregon and Washington, effective 2007.
- Minnesota Multistate Contracting Alliance for Pharmacy (MMCAP)

== See also ==
- Prescription drug
- Prescription drug prices in the United States
