= Datsun 2000 =

Datsun 2000 may refer to one of the following Datsun cars:

- Datsun Sports - sold in some export markets as the Datsun 2000
- Nissan Cedric - sold in some export markets as the Datsun 2000
