= Datsun Roadster =

Datsun Roadster/Road Star/Coupe
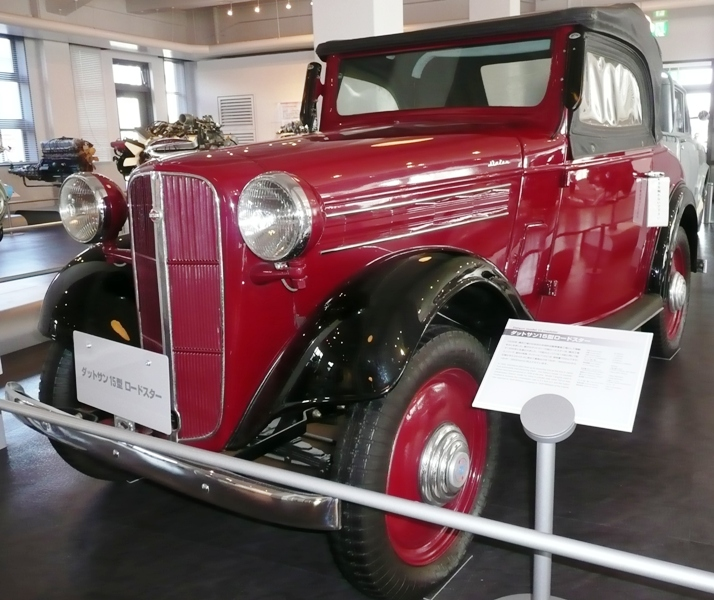

Overview
- Manufacturer: Nissan
- Production: 1932-1941
- Assembly: Yokohama Plant, Kanagawa-ku, Yokohama, Japan

Body and chassis
- Class: Sports car
- Body style: 2-door roadster 2-door coupe
- Layout: FR layout

Powertrain
- Engine: 495 cc DAT I4 (1932-1934); 722 cc Type 7 I4 (1935-1941)

Chronology
- Predecessor: Datsun Type 12
- Successor: Datsun DC-3

The Datsun Roadster was a lightweight automobile produced by Nissan in the 1930s. The series was a predecessor to the Fairlady sports cars, and was an example of the earliest passenger cars produced in Japan. It shows some similarities to the Kurogane Type 95 four-wheel-drive roadster used by the Japanese Army during World War II.

== Roadster ==
The first car to bear the Datsun name was the 1932 Type 11 Roadster. It was powered by a 495 cc straight-4 10 hp (7.5 kW) engine. The 1931 Type 11 had the same engine and was called a "Datson".

== Road Star ==
The Roadster was replaced for 1935 by the Road Star. It used a 14 hp (10.4 kW) 722 cc engine, and a Coupe model was also available. The engine's output was pushed to 16 hp (12 kW) for 1937. Production ended with Japan's entry into World War II in 1941.

== See also ==
- Kurogane Type 95
