= Yutaka Katayama =

Japanese businessman (1909–2015)

Yutaka Katayama 片山 豊
- Born: 15 September 1909; Hamamatsu, Shizuoka Prefecture, Japan
- Died: 19 February 2015 (aged 105); Tokyo, Japan
- Education: Keio University
- Occupation: President (1960–1977) of Nissan Motor Corporation U.S.A.
- Children: 4, including Hiroshi Katayama

Yutaka Katayama (片山 豊, Katayama Yutaka; born Yutaka Asoh; 15 September 1909 – 19 February 2015), also known as Mr. K, was a Japanese automotive executive who was employed by Nissan and served as the first president of Nissan Motor Corporation U.S.A. Katayama expanded Nissan's focus from economy vehicles towards sportier vehicles, and is regarded by Datsun/Nissan Z Car enthusiasts as the father of the Z-Car, as well as the Datsun 510.

== Early years ==
Asoh was born in Shizuoka Prefecture, Japan, the second of four children of a well-off businessman whose postings took the family to various places in Japan and also to Taiwan. While in Taiwan, the young Yutaka fell ill with malaria and was sent to the estate of his paternal grandfather, a wealthy landowner in Saitama Prefecture, to convalesce and attend school. He would gain his first exposure to the United States in mid-1929, while he was preparing to enter his father's alma mater of Keio University. At that time, he got a job as ship's clerk and assistant purser on the freighter London Maru, carrying a cargo of raw silk to Victoria, British Columbia and Vancouver, as well as 20 passengers to Seattle. By several reports, he spent the next four months traveling around the Pacific Northwest while the ship was being loaded with lumber for her return voyage.

In 1935, he graduated from Keio University and landed a job with Nissan. In 1937, he married Masako Katayama and took her family name, as there were no sons in her family and he had two other brothers to carry on the Asoh name.

== Career at Nissan ==
In 1939, during World War II, he was ordered to report to a Nissan plant in the Japanese puppet state of Manchukuo, but managed to obtain a transfer back to Japan in 1941. Near the end of the war in 1945, he refused orders to return to Manchukuo; Katayama later credited his survival of the war to this decision.

He returned to the U.S. in 1960, when Nissan sent him to do market research, after which he returned to Nissan in Japan and persuaded the company to start its own sales company in the United States.

Datsun started to import the first of the Fairlady models starting with the SPL212 in 1960 through to the Datsun Sports 2000, the precursor to the highly successful 240Z. 1968, the Datsun 510 was introduced. It cost $2,000 and carried independent rear suspension on sedans. He persuaded the Nissan corporate office in Japan to export the all new 510 with a larger 1.6 liter motor. This motor allowed the 510 to be viable on American roadways. In 1970, he introduced the Datsun 240Z, which Nissan had originally wanted to be named the Fairlady. However, his radical ideas for operations did not sit well with the executives of Nissan in Japan. Mr. K left America in 1977 for Japan and was forced into retirement. He was inducted into the Automotive Hall of Fame on October 13, 1998 for his lifetime contributions, among them the Datsun 510 and 240Z. He was inducted into the Japan Automotive Hall of Fame in 2008.

A 1997 advertisement campaign for the then-introduced Nissan Frontier featured actor Dale Ishimoto portraying Katayama with a Jack Russell Terrier, stating "Dogs Love Trucks!" The campaign was further expanded to the entire Nissan line in the United States with the tagline "Enjoy The Ride."

== Death and family ==
Katayama died at a hospital in Tokyo February 2015 and was survived by his wife, Masako, two sons and two daughters, 11 grandchildren and 18 great-grandchildren. His son Hiroshi was an Olympic bronze medalist in soccer in the 1968 Mexico City Summer Games.
