= Datsun DC-3 =

Datsun Sports DC-3
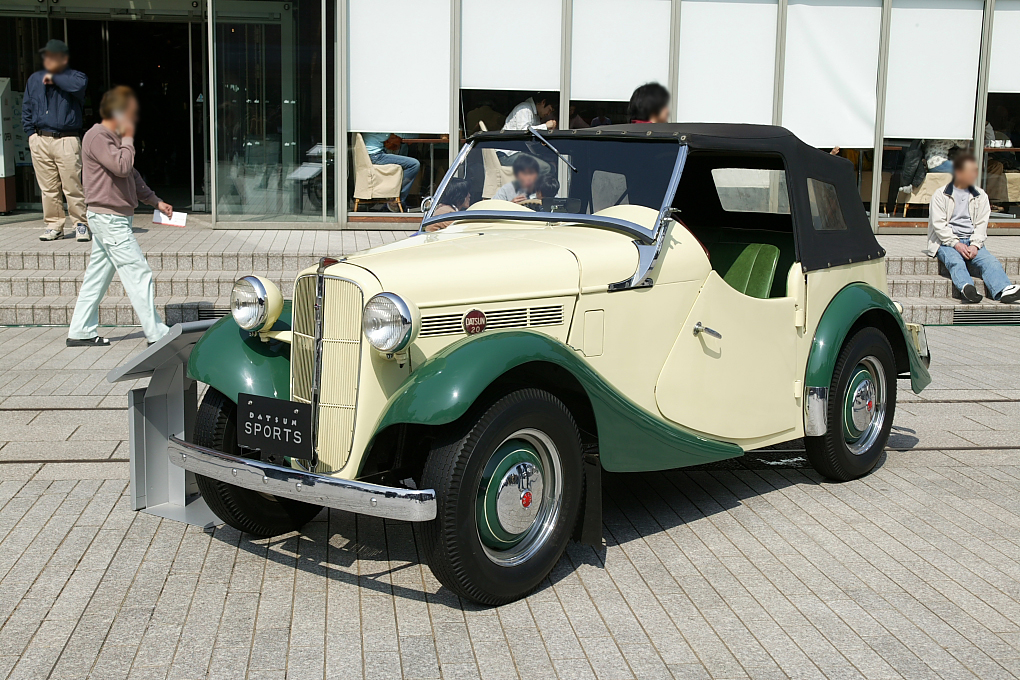

Overview
- Manufacturer: Nissan
- Production: 1952; 50 produced
- Assembly: Japan: Kanagawa-ku, Yokohama (Yokohama Plant)
- Designer: Yuichi Ōta

Body and chassis
- Class: Sports car
- Body style: 2-door roadster
- Layout: FR layout
- Related: Datsun 5147 Pickup

Powertrain
- Engine: 860 cc D10 I4
- Transmission: 3-speed manual

Dimensions
- Wheelbase: 2,150 mm (84.6 in)
- Length: 3,150 mm (124.0 in)
- Width: 1,360 mm (53.5 in)
- Height: 1,450 mm (57.1 in)
- Curb weight: 750 kg (1,653 lb)

Chronology
- Predecessor: Datsun Road Star
- Successor: Datsun S211

The Datsun DC-3 was a lightweight automobile produced by Nissan and sold under the Datsun brand in 1952.

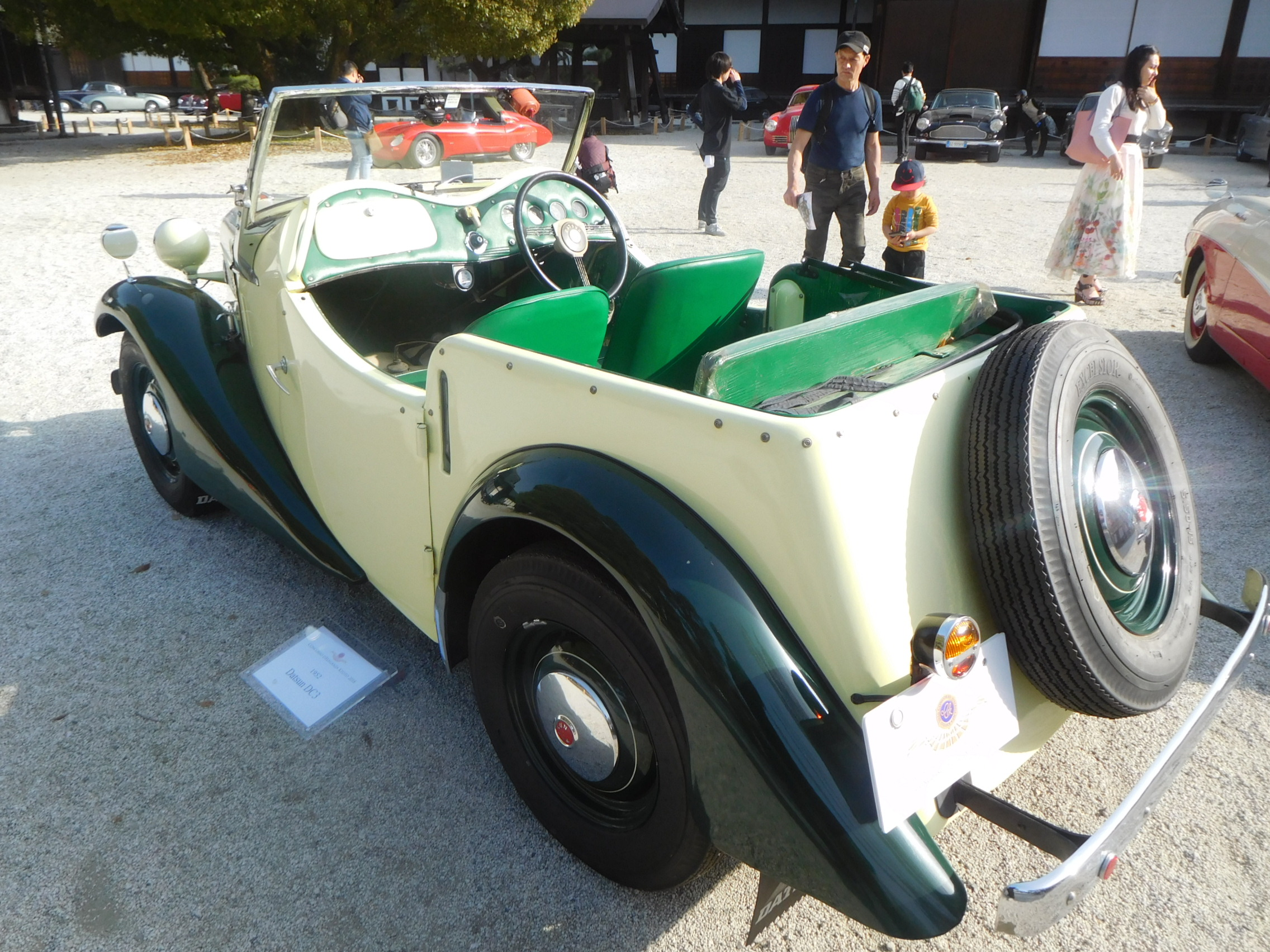
Rear view

The series was a predecessor to the Fairlady sports cars, and succeeded the pre-war Road Star. It was powered by the 860 cc Nissan D10 straight-four engine which produced 20 hp (15 kW) and could propel the DC-3 to 70 km/h (43 mph). The side badges read "Datsun 20" (20 meaning 20PS). Leaf springs were used in the suspension, and a three-speed manual transmission was specified. Four people could ride in the DC-3. Only 50 DC-3s were ever built; of these, 30 were sold (the remaining cars were converted back into trucks). A variant of the DC-3 was the Datsun 5147 pickup.

According to Masahiro Sekiguchi in their book, "Nissan engineers: The men who took on the Fairlady", the project was originally started by Yamagishi Mitsutake, who worked in Nissan's technical department at their Yoshiwara plant. It's said that Mitsutake had grown unsatisfied with the company's post war direction of only manufacturing trucks. As a result, he began quietly working on this project, taking inspiration from Britain's MG sports cars when designing the body. The frame came from a Datsun truck, as did the running gear. Yamagishi Mitsutake died in a traffic accident before the project was finished; soon afterwards, when the project was discovered, development was taken over by Nissan engineer Shoichi Shidei and designer Yuichi Ota. They made substantial changes to the prototype, such as flipping the frame upside down to lower the ride height, and using sandbags to calculate the cars weight distribution. Despite the engine's meager power output, the early prototype performed well, so much so that the team was given the approval to develop a handful of DC-3s. It is said that the DC-3 participated in Japan's first international sports car road race, held in January 1952 at the former Mobara Airfield in the Chiba prefecture.
