= Datsun 1600 =

Datsun 1600 may refer to one of the following Datsun cars:

- Datsun 1600 (510), sold as Datsun 1600 in Australia and Canada, and Datsun 510 in the U.S.
- Datsun Fairlady 1600 Roadster SP311/SPL311
- Nissan Silvia, which was marketed in Australia as the Datsun 1600 Coupe
