= Nissan Z-car =

Nissan Z
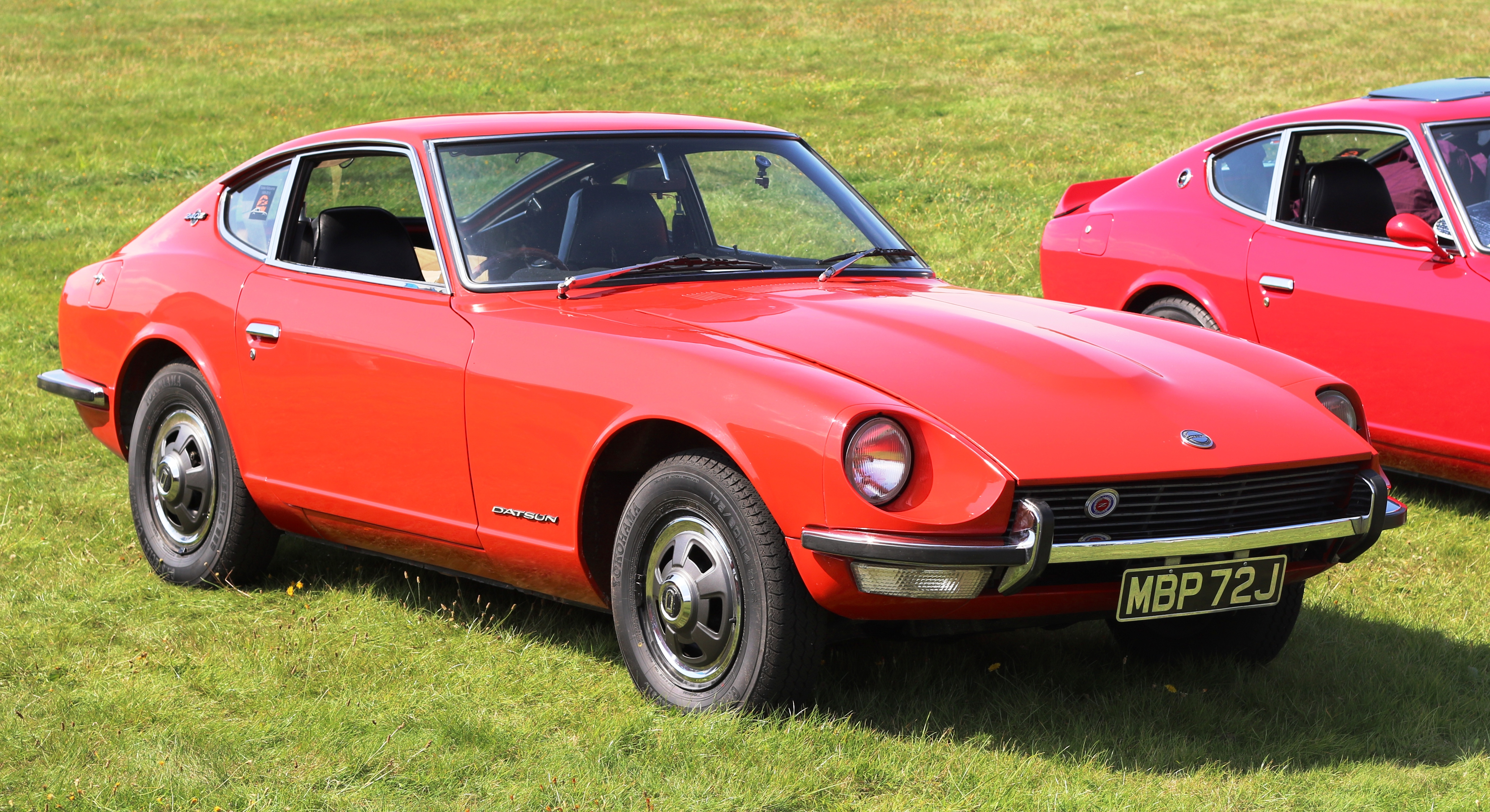
- 1970 Datsun 240Z (S30)

Overview
- Manufacturer: Nissan
- Also called: Nissan Fairlady Z (Japan)
- Production: October 1969–present
- Assembly: Japan: , Kanagawa (Nissan Shatai, 1969–2000); Oppama (2002–2004); Kaminokawa, Tochigi (2004–present); South Africa: Rosslyn, South Africa (1982 to 1985, 2nd generation Z-car.; 1992 to 1994, 4th generation Z-car)

Body and chassis
- Class: Sports car Grand tourer
- Layout: Front mid-engine, rear-wheel-drive (1969-1982, 2002–present); Front-engine, rear-wheel-drive (1983–2000)

Chronology
- Predecessor: Nissan Fairlady

The Nissan Z is a model series of sports cars manufactured by Nissan since 1969.

The original Z was first sold in October 1969 in Japan as the Nissan Fairlady Z (Japanese: 日産・フェアレディZ, Hepburn: Nissan Fearedi Zetto) at Nissan Exhibition dealerships that previously sold the Nissan Bluebird. It was initially marketed as the Datsun 240Z for international customers. Since then, Nissan has manufactured seven generations of Z-cars, with the most recent—simply known as the Nissan Z—in production since 2022.

Main rival cars in the Japanese market included the Toyota Celica, Toyota Supra, Mitsubishi 3000GT and Mazda RX-7.

The earlier models of the Nissan Z were built at the Nissan Shatai plant in Hiratsuka until 2000, while the later models (350Z and 370Z) are built at Oppama (2002–2004) and Tochigi (2004–present). Known for their looks, reliability, performance and affordability, every Z car has been sold in Japan as the Fairlady Z and elsewhere under the names Nissan Fairlady Z (S30), Nissan Fairlady Z (S130), Nissan 300ZX, Nissan 350Z, Nissan 370Z and Nissan Z.

== History ==
Wordmark for Z34 Fairlady Z/370Z..

Wordmark from RZ34 Fairlady Z/Nissan Z.

Nissan was a relatively small automobile manufacturer when it entered the international market in the 1960s and partnered with Yamaha to design a new sports car prototype as an update to the Nissan Fairlady. This effort resulted in the prototype Yamaha YX-30 in 1961. Nissan executives saw the prototype as a halo car that would improve their company's image in the minds of consumers. By 1964, Nissan had realized that Yamaha's DOHC 2.0-liter engine was not meeting Nissan's expectations and the project was scrapped. Yamaha later finished a prototype and took their design to Toyota, resulting in the Toyota 2000GT.

Yutaka Katayama, the president of Nissan USA at the time, realized the importance of making an affordable sports car available internationally. Nissan had already produced the successful series of Fairlady roadsters for many decades that competed mainly with English and Italian roadsters. The product planners envisioned a new line of GT cars that would be stylish, innovative, fast and relatively inexpensive through the use of interchangeable parts with other Nissan vehicles. Nissan also added the engineering background and product development experience of the recently acquired Prince Motor Company, which manufactured the Prince Skyline (renamed Nissan Skyline in 1966).

== First generation: Nissan 240Z/260Z/280Z (S30; 1969–1978) ==
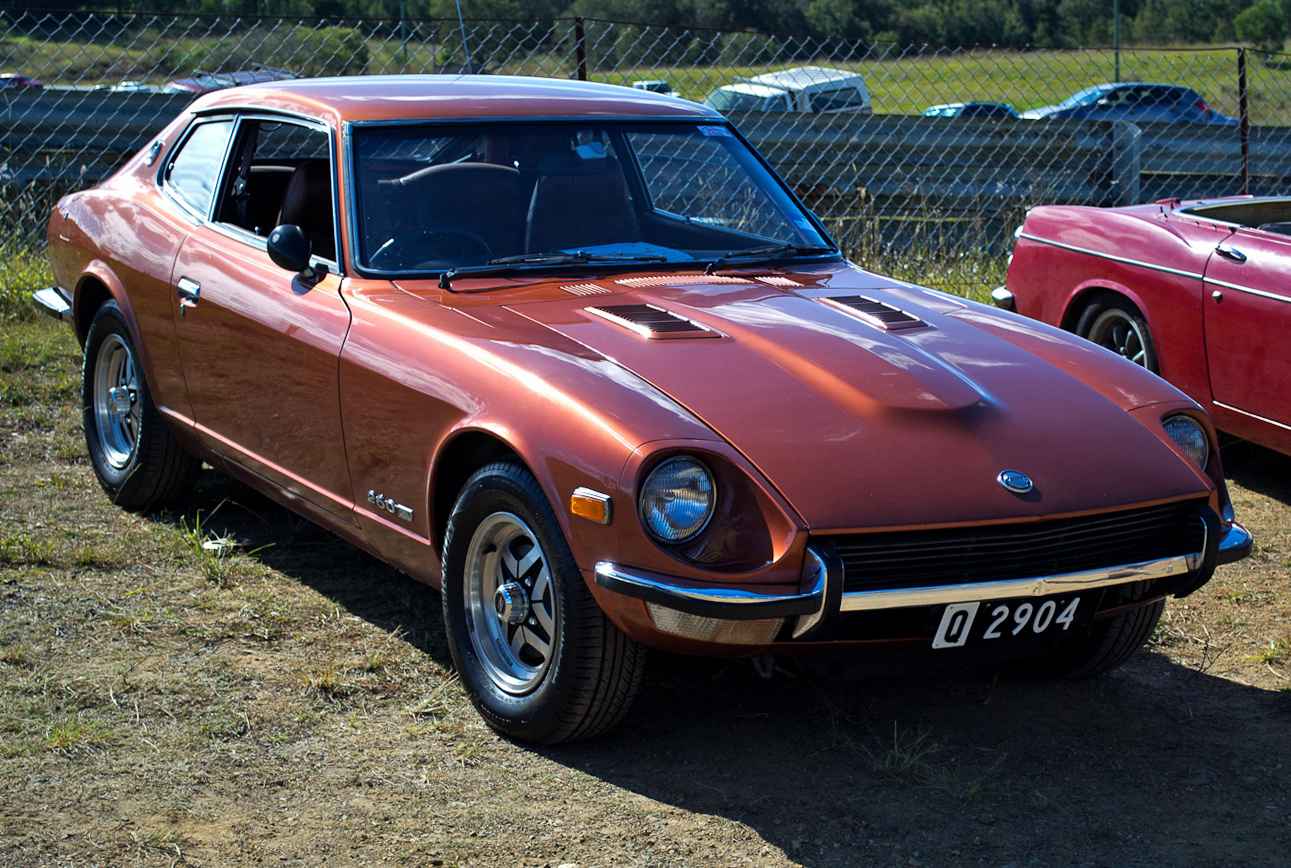
Datsun 260Z 2+2

Sales of the Nissan Z-cars (internally also called S30 or Z29) started in October 1969 (for the 1970 model year), with separate versions for the Japanese and U.S. markets. The Japanese Fairlady Z featured a 2.0L SOHC L20A straight-six engine producing 130 hp JIS (97 kW), while the US Datsun 240Z featured a 2.4L L24 inline-6 with twin Hitachi SU-type carburetors that produced 151 hp SAE gross (113 kW). A third Z, the Z432 (PS30) shared a performance version of the DOHC 2.0 L S20 engine with the Nissan Skyline 2000 GT-R.

In Japan, the Z was still known as the Fairlady to keep the car in line with the previous generation Datsun Sports roadster. Japanese domestic market (JDM) versions had the Fairlady Z badge on the lower fenders with the 432 badge above (the 432 designation was 4 valves, 3 carburetors, and 2 camshafts). However, Yutaka Katayama ensured the American version had all Nissan, Fairlady Z, and 432 badging replaced with "Datsun" and prevented all dealer shipments until they were replaced.

The 240Z was released in America on October 22, 1969. It sold over 45,000 units through the '71 model year and over 50,000 and 40,000 in 1972 and 1973, respectively.

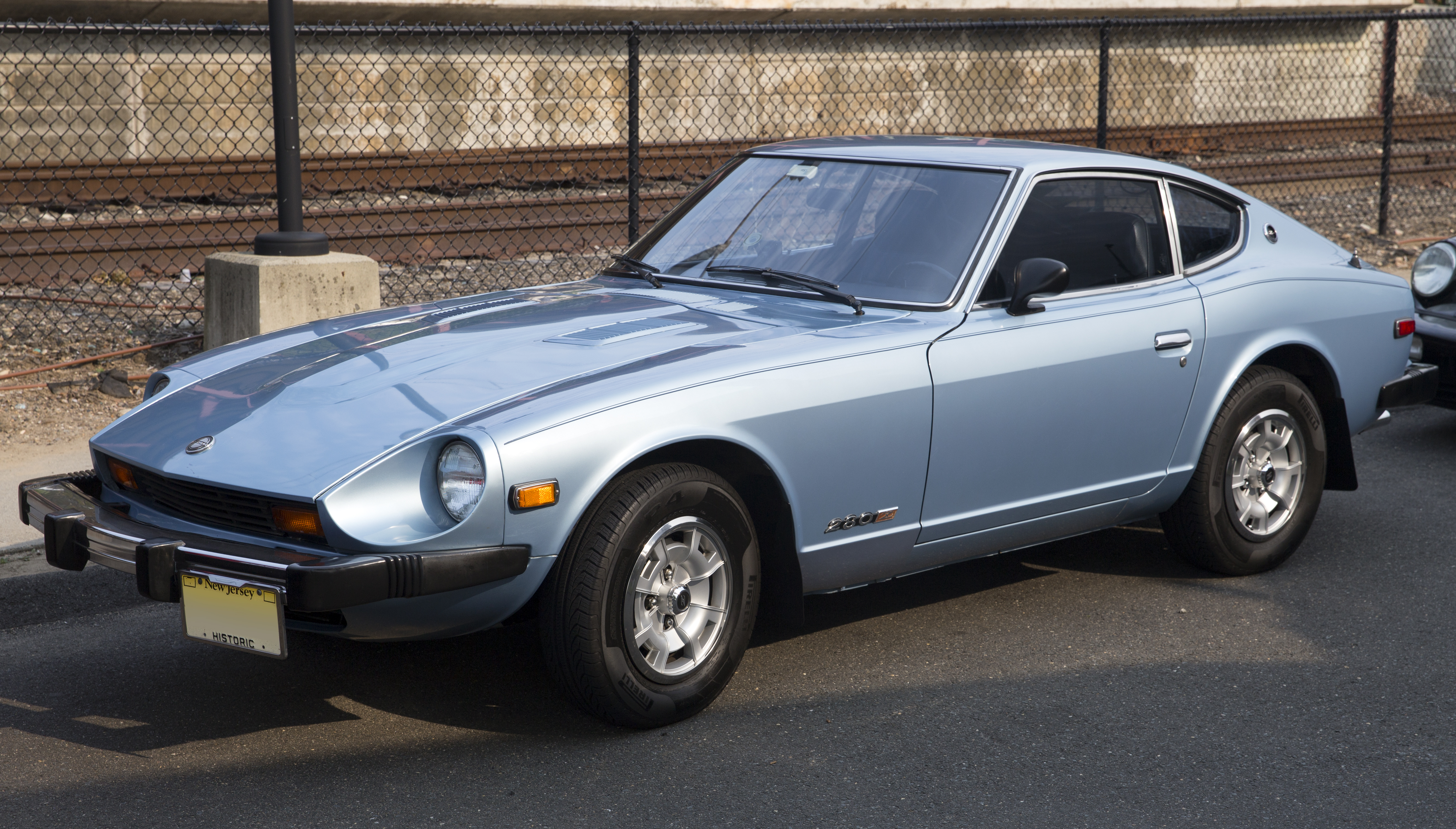
Datsun 280Z (S30)

The 260Z was released in 1974. Engine displacement increased to 2.6 L, and Nissan introduced a 2+2 model option with a 30 cm (1 foot) stretched wheelbase and length. Engine power increased to 154 hp (115 kW), except for most areas of the U.S., where power decreased to 139 hp SAE gross (104 kW) due to new camshafts, carburetors, and lower compression, that were introduced to comply with new US emissions regulations.

The 280Z was released in 1975 for North America only (not to be confused with the second-generation 280ZX) and featured a further engine displacement increase, to 2.8 liters. A major change was the introduction of Bosch fuel injection, replacing the previous SU carburetors. This resulted in a power increase to 170 hp SAE gross (127 kW), offsetting increased weight from added luxury features and an enlarged bumper that met US Federal regulations. Export markets outside North America however kept receiving the Datsun 260Z, until the introduction of the Datsun 280ZX in late 1978.

== Second generation: Nissan 280ZX (S130; 1978–1983) ==
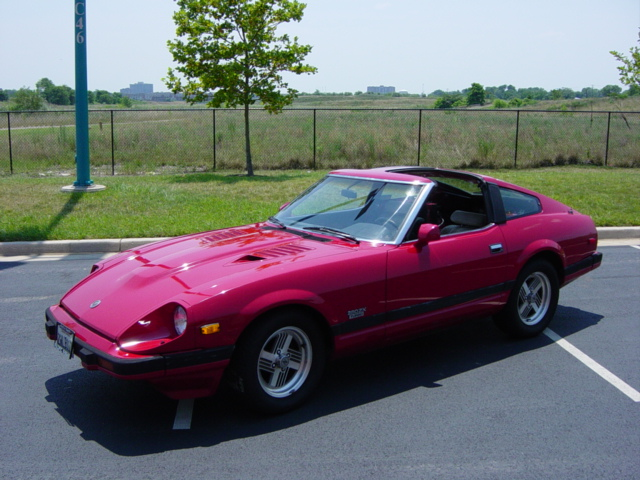
Nissan/Datsun 280ZX (S130)

Known as the Datsun/Nissan 280ZX in export markets, the car continued to use the "Fairlady" moniker in the Japanese domestic market where 2-litre inline-six engines were also available and were first introduced in 1978. That same year, main rival Toyota introduced the Supra as its answer to the new Fairlady, although it also continued to produce the Celica that it was based on.

The only thing left unchanged from the previous 280Z was the 5-speed manual transmission and 2.8-liter L28 inline-6 engine, while the entire car overall was made more luxurious to meet growing consumer demands. Major changes for this new generation of Z-cars include t-tops, introduced in 1980, and a turbocharged model introduced in 1981, complementing the naturally aspirated (NA) 2-seater and NA 2+2 models. Coupled with either a 3-speed automatic or 5-speed manual transmission, the turbocharged model was capable of 180 bhp (130 kW) and 203 lbf⋅ft (275 N⋅m) of torque, over the 135 bhp (101 kW) and 144 lbf⋅ft (195 N⋅m) of the NA engine.

Notable models include the 10th Anniversary Edition, featuring gold emblems, gold alloy wheels, and two-toned paint in either gold/red and black, with luxury features such as leather seats, headlamp washers, and automatic climate control.

The 280ZX was wildly popular, being hailed as Motor Trend's Import Car of the Year for 1979 and going on to set a Z-car sales record of 86,007 units in its first year. While on the one hand, it received praise for taking the Z-car to further levels of comfort and performance, many enthusiasts also lamented the further emphasis on luxury over driving fun. This would continue with the third generation of the Z-car, with a clean-sheet redesign.

== Third generation: Nissan 300ZX (Z31, 1983–1989) ==
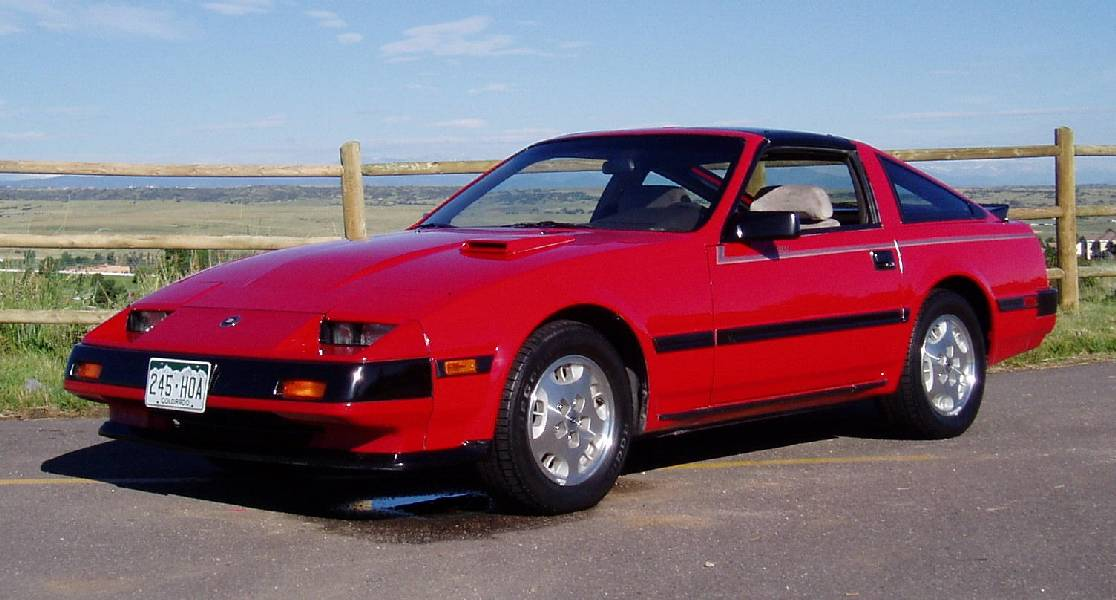
Early model Nissan 300ZX (Z31)

The Z-car was completely redesigned in 1984 and introduced Nissan's new series of 3.0-liter V6 engine, dubbed the VG series. The same engine was used in the electramotive (later to become NPTI) GTP ZX-Turbo that dominated the IMSA GTP races in 1988 and 1989. These were available in both VG30E naturally aspirated and VG30ET turbocharged forms producing 160 and 200 bhp (119 and 149 kW) respectively, although some VG30ET powered Z-cars exported outside of the U.S. produced 228 PS (168 kW) due to a longer cam duration and fewer emission restrictions. These were showcased in sleek new wedge-shaped styling and given a new name, the 300ZX. Like its predecessor, it proved to be wildly popular and was the second best-selling Z-car in history selling over 70,000 units due in part not only to its new styling but also to even more added luxury features and high performance. When the 300ZX Turbo was released in Japan, it offered the highest HP available in a Japanese standard production car at the time.

Much like the 280ZX that preceded it, the first gen 300ZX was thought by enthusiasts as more GT than a true sports car. It had improved handling, acceleration, and refinement than any previous model Z-car.

Nissan made various changes and claimed improvements to the Z31 model throughout its entire production. In 1983, Nissan first offered the 300ZX in Japan. It was introduced in the US one year later. All US-market 1984 model Nissan vehicles carried both Datsun and Nissan nameplates. Along with the arrival of their new flagship sports coupe, Nissan launched an aggressive marketing campaign to promote the brand name change from Datsun to Nissan. The 1984 Model can technically be considered the only year of the "Datsun 300ZX". The 1984 300ZX 50th Anniversary Edition was released in celebration of the company's 50th anniversary year. It was based on the standard 300ZX Turbo but was outfitted with every luxury feature available, a unique black interior with "body sonic" leather seats in addition to widened fender flares, requisite badging, rear quarter panel flares, and sixteen-inch (406 mm) wheels (400 mm).

For the 1985 model year, Nissan dropped the Datsun name brand for good, but the car dealers were still known as Datsun dealers. Paul Newman raced a Nissan 300ZX Turbo in the 1985 GT1 Challenge and won his fourth Sports Car Club of America national championship, his second SCCA title in GT-1 category, in the Valvoline Road Racing Classic at Road Atlanta in Braselton, Georgia. Minor changes were made to the 300ZX including a water-cooled turbocharger and smoked taillights.

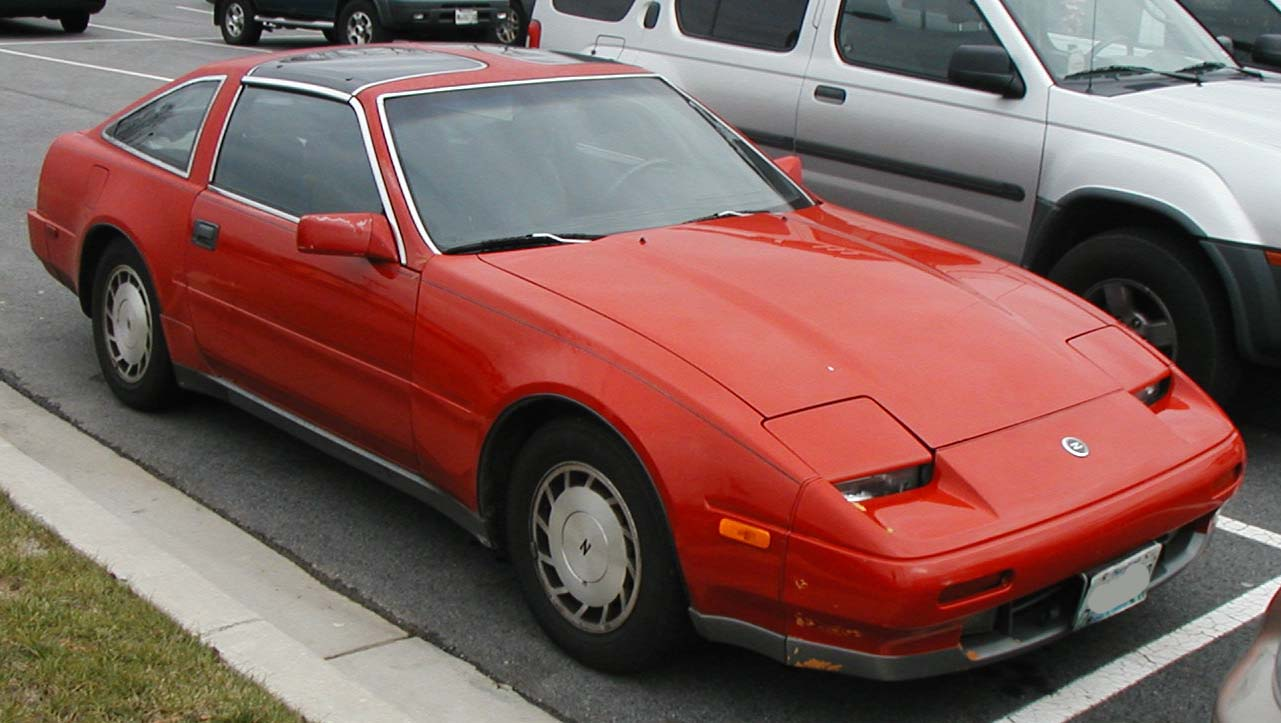
Facelift Nissan 300ZX (Z31, US)

The 1986 model saw wider flared wheel wells, as well as body-color bumpers, and the rear quarter panels, were designed specifically to accommodate factory ground effect style side skirts. 1986 turbo models were equipped with an ordinary hood, markedly losing the turbo "scoop" on the driver's side.

To keep up with quickly aging aesthetics, another slight redesign happened in 1987, consisting of new rounded, restyled, and longer front and rear bumpers, new headlights, and new taillights. The black trim on turbo models was now charcoal instead of gloss black, and 1987 Turbo models came with special "smoked" turbo-finned wheels. All 1987 model year turbo cars also received an upgraded manual transmission, and larger and more powerful brakes, and turbo cars produced from April 1987 and later came equipped with a clutch-type, limited-slip differential.

For the 1988 models, there were again a few small changes. The turbocharger was switched from the Garrett T3 turbo to a lower-inertia T25 turbo, and the engine was from 7.8:1 to an 8.3:1 compression ratio to reduce turbocharger spool time and provide an instant boost at any usable RPM. The interior aluminum accents and chrome door handles that adorned the earlier cars were dropped in favor of matching color parts. Another special edition, the "Shiro Special" (SS), was released in 1988. It was only available in pearl white (Shiro meaning "white" in Japanese). The SS package consisted of analog gauges and climate controls with a black interior, stiffer sway bars, stiffer springs, non-adjustable suspension, special seats (Recaro), a viscous-coupling limited slip differential, and a special front lower lip spoiler. This package had no options; all 88SS cars are identical.

The 1989 models are identical to 1988 models, though somewhat rare because Nissan winding-down production early in preparation for the second generation 300ZX.

== Fourth generation: Nissan 300ZX (Z32; 1989–2000) ==
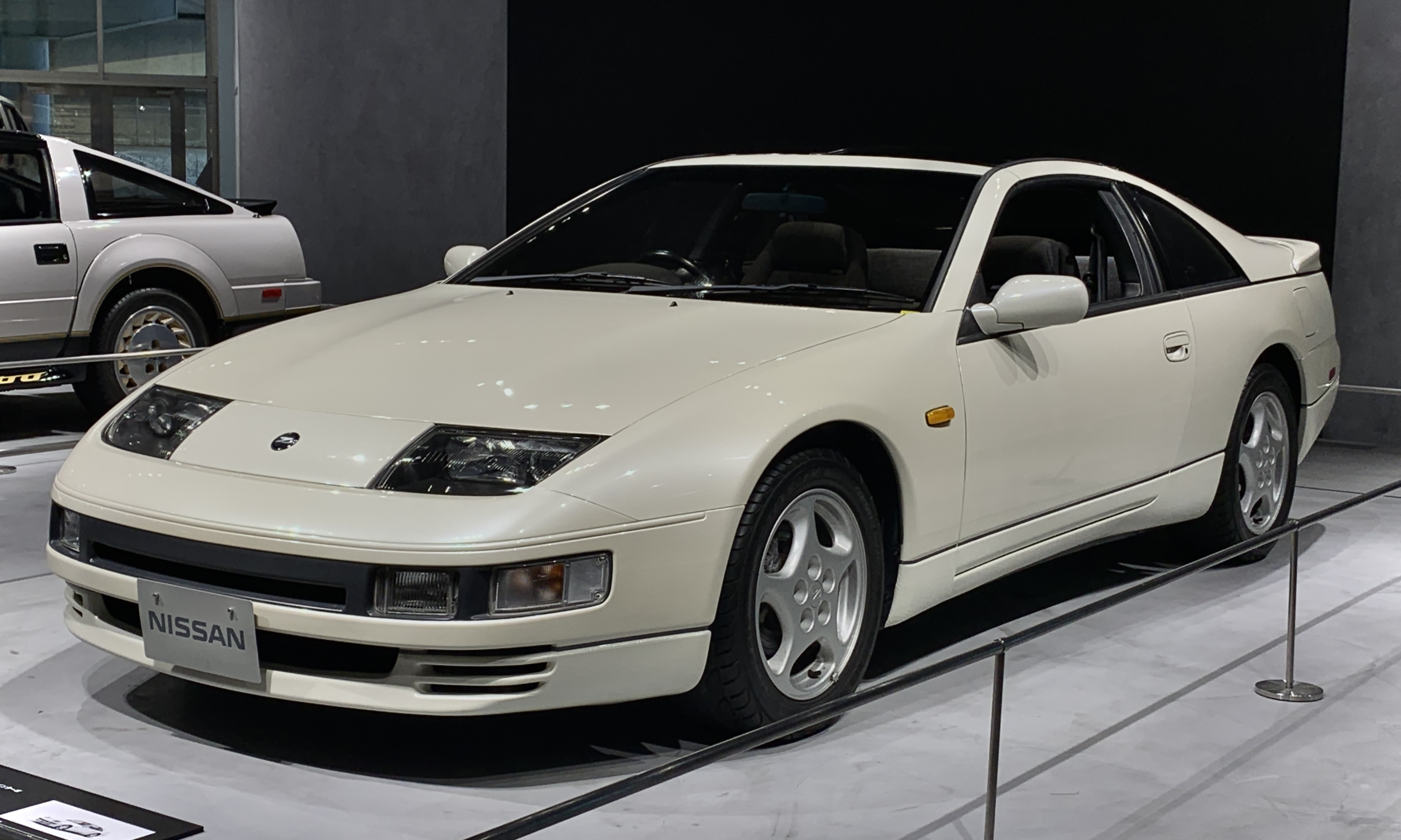
Nissan Fairlady Z (Z32)

The only thing unchanged from the previous generation 300ZX is the 3.0-liter V6 engine, now with dual overhead camshafts (DOHC), variable valve timing (VVT) and producing a rated 222 hp (166 kW) and 198 lb⋅ft (268 N⋅m) naturally aspirated. The turbo variant was upgraded with twin Garrett turbochargers and dual intercoolers. This produced 300 hp (220 kW) with 283 lb⋅ft (384 N⋅m) of torque. 0-60 times of 5.0-6.0 seconds were reported, and it had a governed top speed of 155 mph (249 km/h).

Upon its release, the 300ZX won Motor Trend's "Import Car of the Year" in 1990 as well as "One of the Top Ten Performance Cars". Automobile Magazine honored the 300ZX/300ZX Turbo as its "Design of the Year" and added it to their "All Stars" list. Road & Track named the 300ZX Turbo "One of the Ten Best Cars in the World", and Car and Driver added it to their 10Best for the seven years in which it was in production in America. American Z-car sales reached 1 million in 1990.

Nissan utilized the Cray-II supercomputer to completely design the new 300ZX with the form of CAD software. This made the 300ZX one of the first production cars to be developed in a CAD program. In return, it featured a whole host of technological advancements. On the twin turbo models, four-wheel steering was available under the name Super HICAS (High Capacity Actively Controlled Steering). The twin turbochargers, intercoolers, and requisite plumbing were left for a cramped engine bay; however, everything fit perfectly.

Like previous generations, Nissan offered a 2+2 model with the Z32. In 1993, a convertible version was introduced in the Z-car's history, as a response to aftermarket conversions. All 300ZXs now featured T-tops as standard, yet there were some rare hardtops (known as "slick tops") produced as well.

The 300ZX was doomed to the same fate as many Japanese sports cars of the time. The mid-'90s trend toward SUVs and the rising Yen:Dollar ratio were both influential in ending North American 300ZX sales in 1996 at over 80,000 units sold (production for other markets continued until 2000). Probably the biggest killer of the 300ZX was its ever-inflating price; at its release it was priced at about $30,000, but in its final year this price had increased to around $50,000. This left many people questioning its value, and despite a final Commemorative Edition of the final 300 units shipped to America (complete with decals and certificates of authenticity), the Z-Car was on hiatus. In Japan, however, the 300ZX lived on for a few more years with a face-lift including a new front fascia, tail lights, headlights, rear spoiler, and a few other minor changes.

=== Nissan 240Z Concept (1999) ===
1999 Nissan 240Z Concept

In the U.S., the Z-car went on hiatus from 1997 to 2002, as Nissan focused more on SUVs and was also in some financial trouble. To keep Z-car interest alive, Nissan launched a restoration program in 1998 for which they purchased original 240Zs, professionally restored them, and re-sold them at dealerships for about $24,000.

Nissan next launched a concept car at the 1999 North American International Auto Show, the 240Z Concept. A throwback to the original, it was a bright orange two-seater with classic swept-back styling. In addition, it was fully functional, with the 2.4-liter 4-cylinder KA24DE engine from the 240SX featuring 200 bhp (149 kW) and 180 lb⋅ft (244 N⋅m) of torque. The designers used an original 240Z as inspiration and the concept was created in 12 weeks.

The running concept, featuring a 4-cylinder engine compared to the Z-car's traditional 6-cylinder engine, was eventually thought less than a worthy successor to the line.

== Fifth generation: Nissan 350Z (Z33; 2002–2008) ==
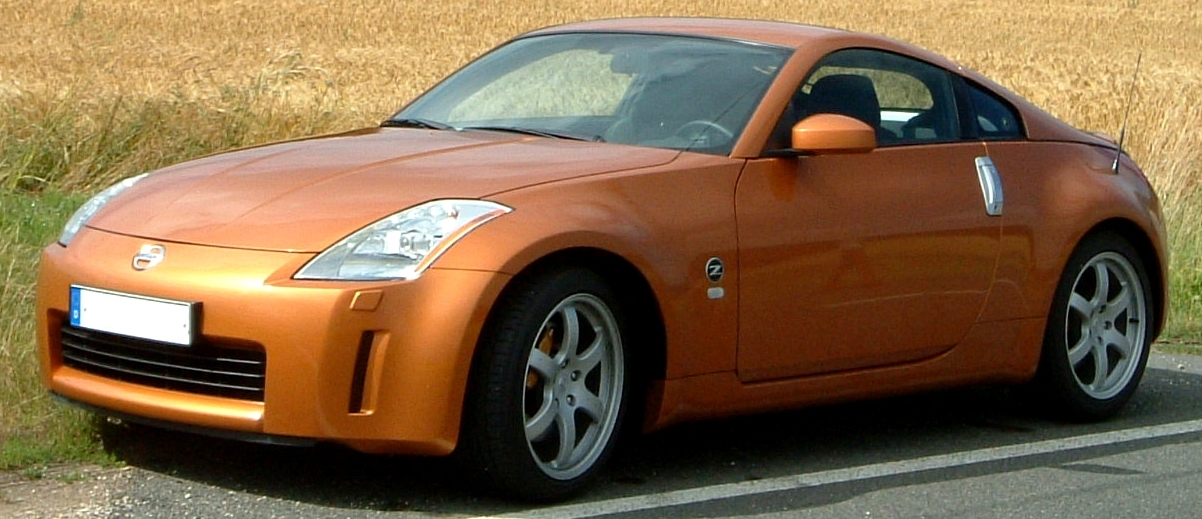
Nissan 350Z (Z33, Germany)

In 1999, the French company Renault bought 44.4% of Nissan and Carlos Ghosn became its chief operating officer, but it would not be until 2001 when Ghosn became CEO that he would tell reporters: "We will build the Z. And we will make it profitable."

On January 8, 2001, Nissan introduced the Z Concept. Much like the previous Z concept, it debuted at the 1999 North American International Auto Show and was painted bright orange. The squat, long-hood/short-deck styling resulted from a competition between Nissan's Japanese, European, and American design studios, with the La Jolla, California studio's design being chosen in March 2000. The product planners hoped to avoid the price problems that plagued the last few years of the 300ZX with a target MSRP of $30,000 while using the Porsche Boxster as a benchmark.

In the summer of 2002, the 350Z was released to wide acclaim. It employed a slightly improved version of the 3.5-liter VQ35DE DOHC V6 engine found in multiple Nissan cars at the time, including the Skyline and Pathfinder. Released in July 2002 in Japan at reorganized Nissan Japanese dealerships called Nissan Blue Stage, and on August 20, 2002, in the U.S., the 350Z coupé was available in 5 trim packages: '350Z' (Base), 'Enthusiast', 'Performance', 'Touring', and 'Track' editions. In Europe, only the 'Track' trim was available, although it was badged and marketed as '350Z'. This engine initially produced 287 bhp (214 kW) and 274 lb⋅ft (371 N⋅m) torque, but in 2005 was increased to 300 bhp (220 kW) and 260 lb⋅ft (353 N⋅m). Prices started at $26,000 US, well below the $30,000 mark initially set forth by Nissan. Coupled with either a 6-speed manual gearbox or a 5-speed automatic (the automatic lost 13 bhp (9.7 kW) in comparison), it was initially available only as a 2-seater hardtop. A convertible model was later introduced in 2004.

The 350Z was available in a selection of seven trim packages, depending on the year: "Base", "Enthusiast", "Performance", "Touring", "Grand Touring", "Track" and "Nismo". The base model 350Z, in comparison to the more expensive packages, did not have a limited-slip differential or a traction control system. Touring and Grand Touring models both featured leather seats, Bose entertainment systems, optional satellite navigation, VDC (vehicle dynamic control), and other user conveniences, while the Grand Touring models also added Rays Engineering forged wheels and the Brembo braking system found on the Track and Nismo models. In 2007, Nissan dropped the "Track" version in favor of the "Nismo" edition, but retained the Brembo brakes, Rays Engineering wheels, and simple interior, but added a larger exhaust and aggressive body kit. The second Nismo edition, released in 2007, included revised camshafts, a Nismo sport-tuned exhaust, custom Rays Engineering 18-inch (460 mm) wheels (19 in or 480 mm in rear), front and rear spoilers and rear diffuser, and a Brembo braking system with four-piston front and two-piston rear calipers (with 12.8 in or 330 mm front and 12.7 in or 320 mm rear rotors).

The 2005 35th Anniversary Edition and 2006 350Z were equipped with 6-speed manual transmissions and received a newly revised engine, which increased the redline to 6,400 rpm and increased power to 300 hp (224 kW).

2007-2008 models came with the 3.5L VQ35HR engine with dual intakes and a 7,500 rpm redline, which produced a power output of 306 hp (228 kW), and featured a more linear powerband in addition to the increased torque at lower revolutions. It is widely believed that this model year (2007–2008) is the most desired among enthusiasts due to the car featuring a revised transmission (CD009) which solved all previous issues and the new engine architecture (VQ35HR) which provided an overall faster car.

== Sixth generation: Nissan 370Z (Z34; 2008–2021) ==
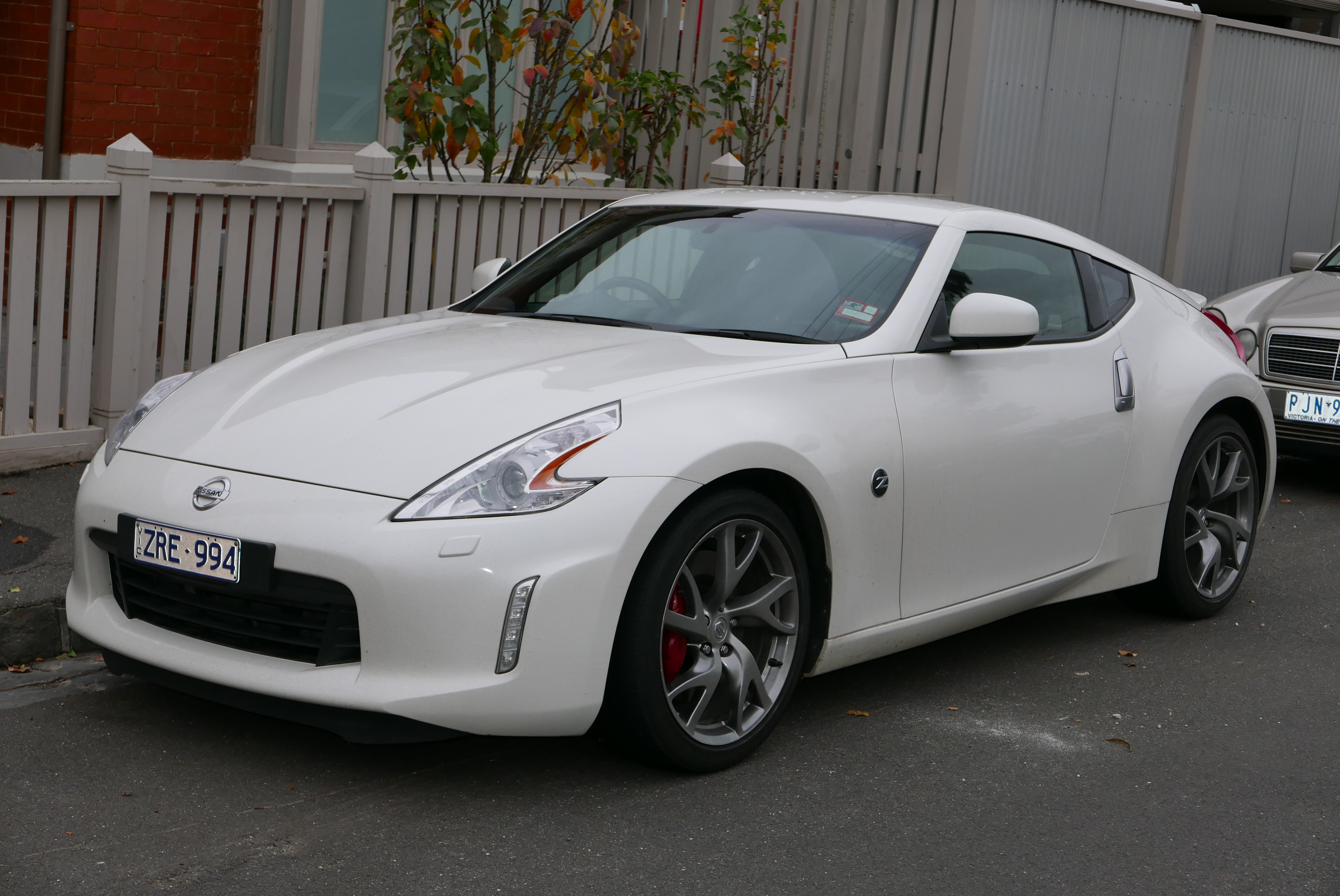
Nissan 370Z (Z34)

The Fairlady Z Z34 was launched on December 1, 2008 in Japan. Followed by the Nissan 370Z which was released on December 30, 2008, as a 2009 model year. In June 2009, the second generation 2009 Nismo 370Z debuted. This was followed by the introduction of the 2010 370Z Roadster in late summer of 2009.

The 370Z (Z34) is powered by Nissan's 3.7 liter V6 engine, the VQ37VHR. The power output ranges from 333 to 355 PS (245 to 261 kW; 328 to 350 hp), with peak torque of 37 to 38 kg⋅m (363 to 373 N⋅m; 268 to 275 lb⋅ft), depending on market and variant. The 370Z has an official 0–60 mph (97 km/h) time of 5.1 seconds. However, the car has also been tested by Motor Trend Magazine, which reported a 4.7 second 0–60 mph (97 km/h) with 1-foot (0.3 m) of rollout. Quarter mile times range from 13.1 and 13.6 seconds, thus making the 370Z the fastest production Z. The 370Z is available with either a six-speed manual gearbox or a seven-speed automatic with paddle shifters. The six-speed manual is the first production car manual gearbox to feature a system that Nissan refers to as SynchroRev Match, which automatically blips the throttle to match engine and transmission speed during downshifts, thus achieving the same effect as the heel-and-toe downshift technique.

A minor facelift was occurred in July 2012.

== Seventh generation: Nissan Z (RZ34) ==
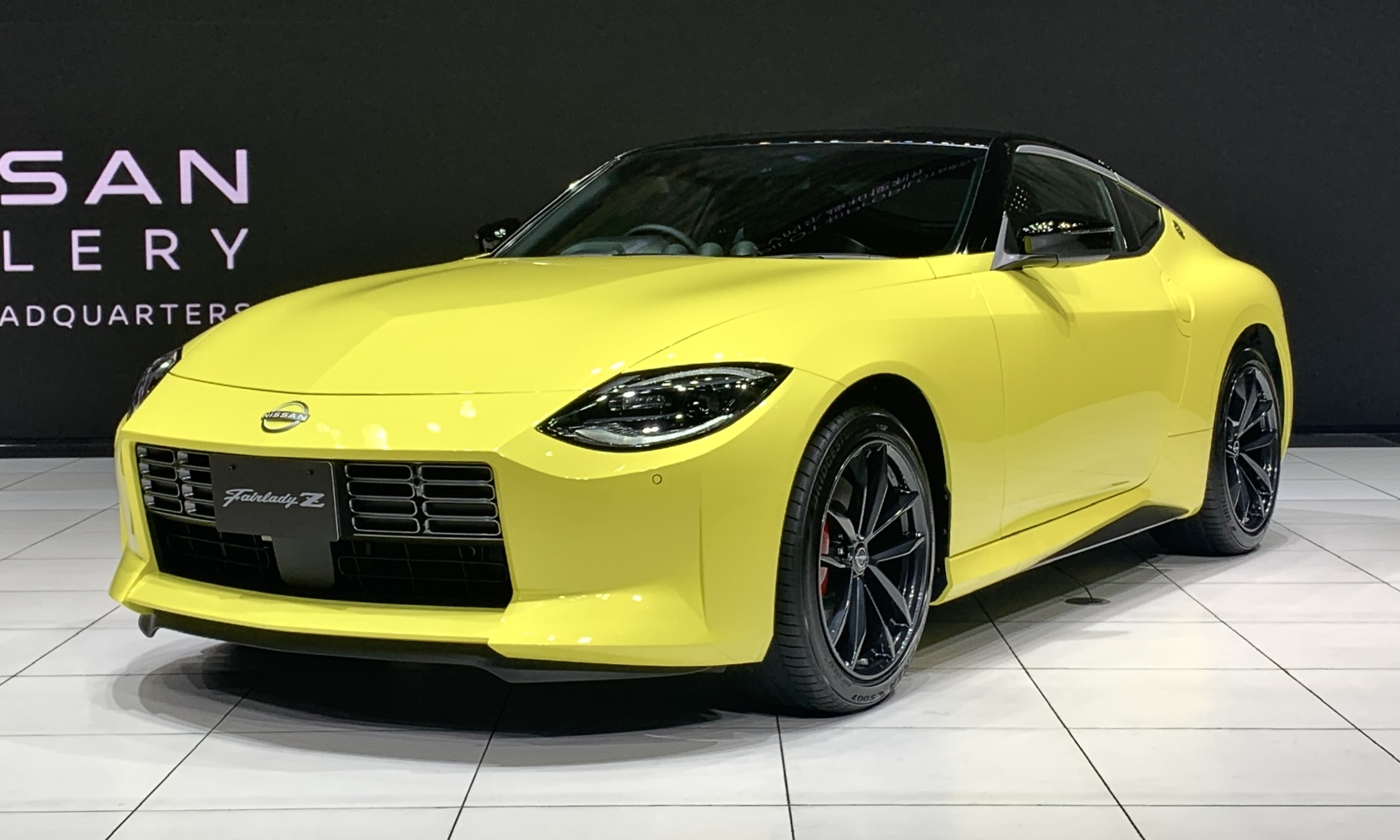
Nissan Z (RZ34)

The seventh-generation Nissan Z was first hinted at in 2018, when Alfonso Albaisa, senior vice president for global design at Nissan, confirmed to Australian automotive magazine WhichCar that a successor to the Nissan 370Z was being developed. On March 19, 2020, Nissan filed a trademark for two new logos: one was its new corporate logo, while the other was a new version of the Z-car logo, further confirming the existence of a new Z-car. Then, on May 28, 2020, as part of its global restructuring plan, named "Nissan Next", Nissan's official YouTube channel released a one-minute, twelve-second video showcasing its updated vehicle lineup, including the new Z-car; this video also confirmed the claim that the new Z-car would have retro styling, with its overall shape and circular running lights referencing the 240Z. On September 15, 2020, Nissan revealed the prototype version called the "Nissan Z Proto". The prototype was 4,382 mm (172.5 in) long, which was 142 mm (5.6 in) longer than the 370Z, and no wider. The production 2023 model Nissan Z was revealed on August 17, 2021, in New York City. Debuting as a 2023 model, the Nissan Z was the brand's first Z car without a number in the model name (which in the past had reflected the displacement of the engine). On August 18, 2021, Nissan confirmed that the new Z would not carry the Z35 chassis code but instead the RZ34 chassis code.

== Engines ==
The first two generations, S30 (240Z/260Z/280Z) and S130 (280ZX) of Z-car were powered by a straight-six engine, (part of the L-series of Nissan engines, which powered most of their vehicles until the early 1980s) with a displacement of 2.4 L in the first incarnation, and increasing to 2.6 L and 2.8 L in the 260Z, and the 280Z and ZX, respectively. The Nissan S130 Model was capable of a top speed of 130 mph (210 km/h), and the S30, despite having the same engine, boasted a lesser top speed of 125 mph (201 km/h).

The second generation S130, introduced in 1979 was a complete redesign, retaining only the L28 engine and other driveline components. A turbo option was introduced in 1981, bringing performance surpassing that of the original 240Z.

The third generation, the 300ZX, switched to a 3.0 L V6. There were two generations of the 300ZX: the Z31 from 1984 to 1989, and the Z32 from 1990 to 1996. Both the Z31 and Z32 came in either non-turbo or turbo trims. During the '90s, the car's price continued to elevate and sales continued to fall. Even a major design change in 1998 couldn't save it, and production finally ended in 1999. This generation had a top speed of 155 mph (249 km/h).

While the model names were based on the engine capacity for the US markets, with the 240Z having a 2.4-liter L24 engine and the 260Z having a 2.6-liter L26 engine and so on to the 300ZX 3.0-litre V6, due to Japanese taxation laws relating to engine capacity, some second and third generation (S130 and Z31) Fairlady Z cars were produced for the Japanese domestic market fitted with 2.0L engines. The S130 was available with an L20ET inline 6, while the Z31 had either a RB20DET inline 6 or a VG30DET V6.

In the 2003 model year, Nissan reentered the US sports-car market with the 350Z, powered by the 3.5 L VQ35DE V6 producing 291 PS (214 kW; 287 hp), and styled in an attempt to create a more modern interpretation of the 240Z's lines. It had a new six-speed manual gearbox, and is capable of over 155 mph (249 km/h). The 350Z's engine was updated twice; in 2005 to the VQ35DE RevUp, producing 304 PS (224 kW; 300 hp), and in 2007 to the VQ35HR, producing 315 PS (232 kW; 311 hp).

The 370Z features a 3.7L VQ37VHR V6 producing 333–355 PS (245–261 kW; 328–350 hp). This engine shares much of its architecture with the VQ35HR, the primary differences being the introduction of Nissan's VVEL (Variable Valve Event and Lift) and an increase in overall displacement. Due to the similarities between the two engines, many OEM and aftermarket parts are interchangeable. The new 370Z, like the previous two generations, is electronically limited to 155 mph (249 km/h).

The seventh generation Z is powered by a twin-turbocharged 3.0L VR30DDTT V6 producing 406 PS (299 kW; 400 hp) and 350 lb-ft of torque mated to a six speed manual transmission complete with an Exedy clutch or a nine-speed automatic Jatco transmission.

== Racing ==
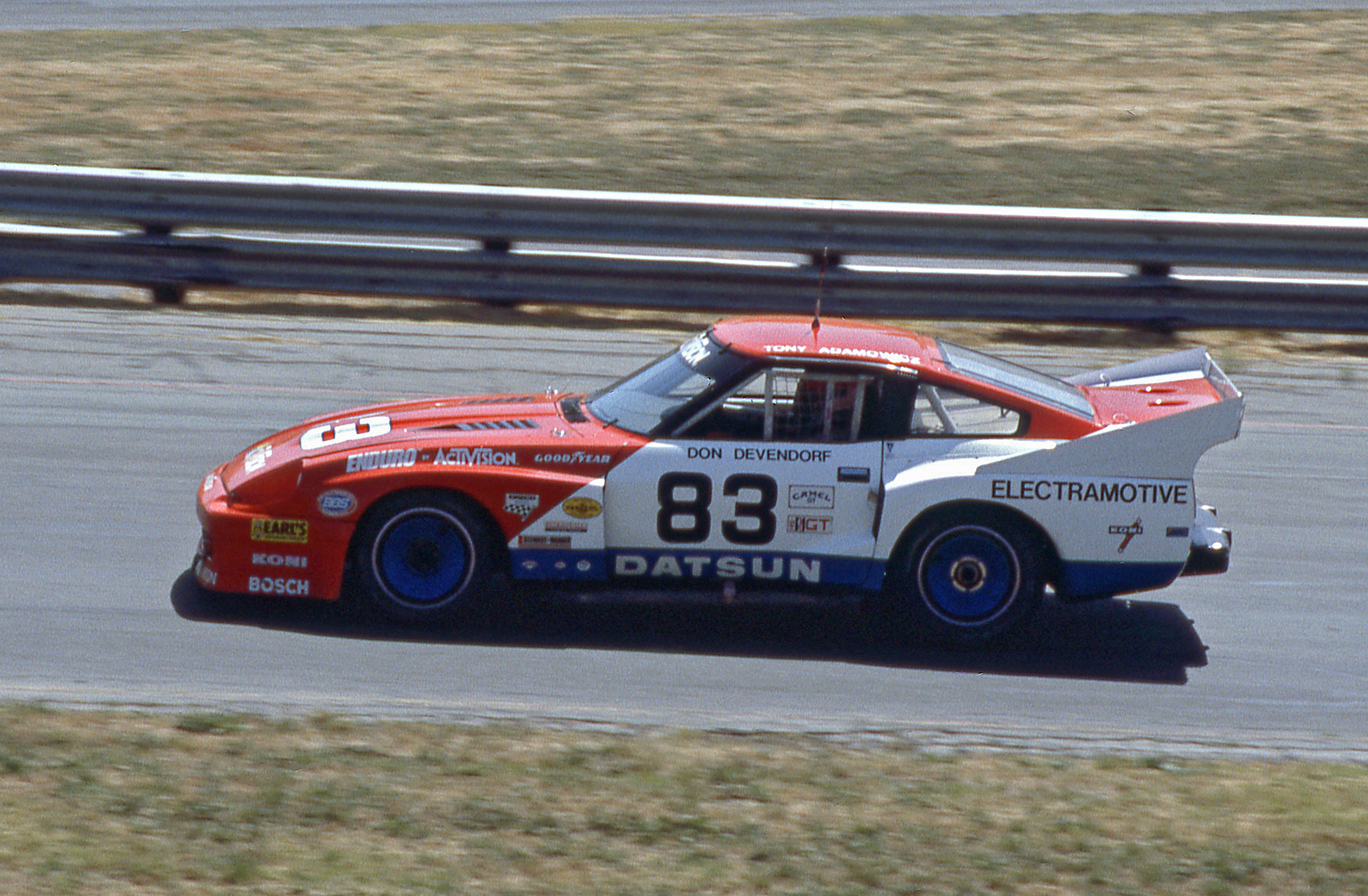
Don Devendorf and Tony Adamowicz drove a 280ZX Turbo to the 1983 IMSA GTO Championship.

The 280ZX proved successful in various classes of racing, particularly in the US. Significant results include:

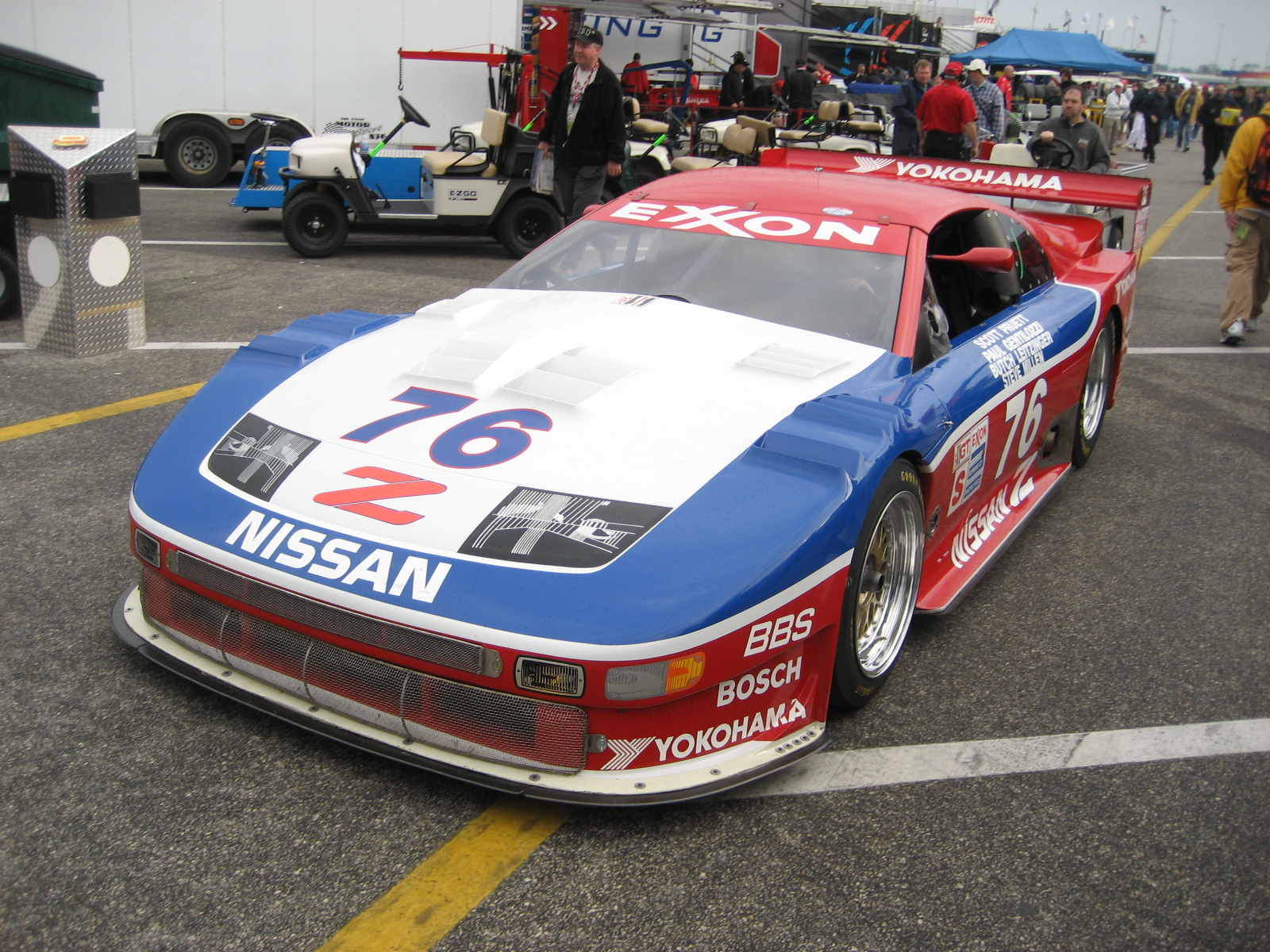
The Clayton Cunningham Racing 300ZX which won the 1994 24 Hours of Daytona.

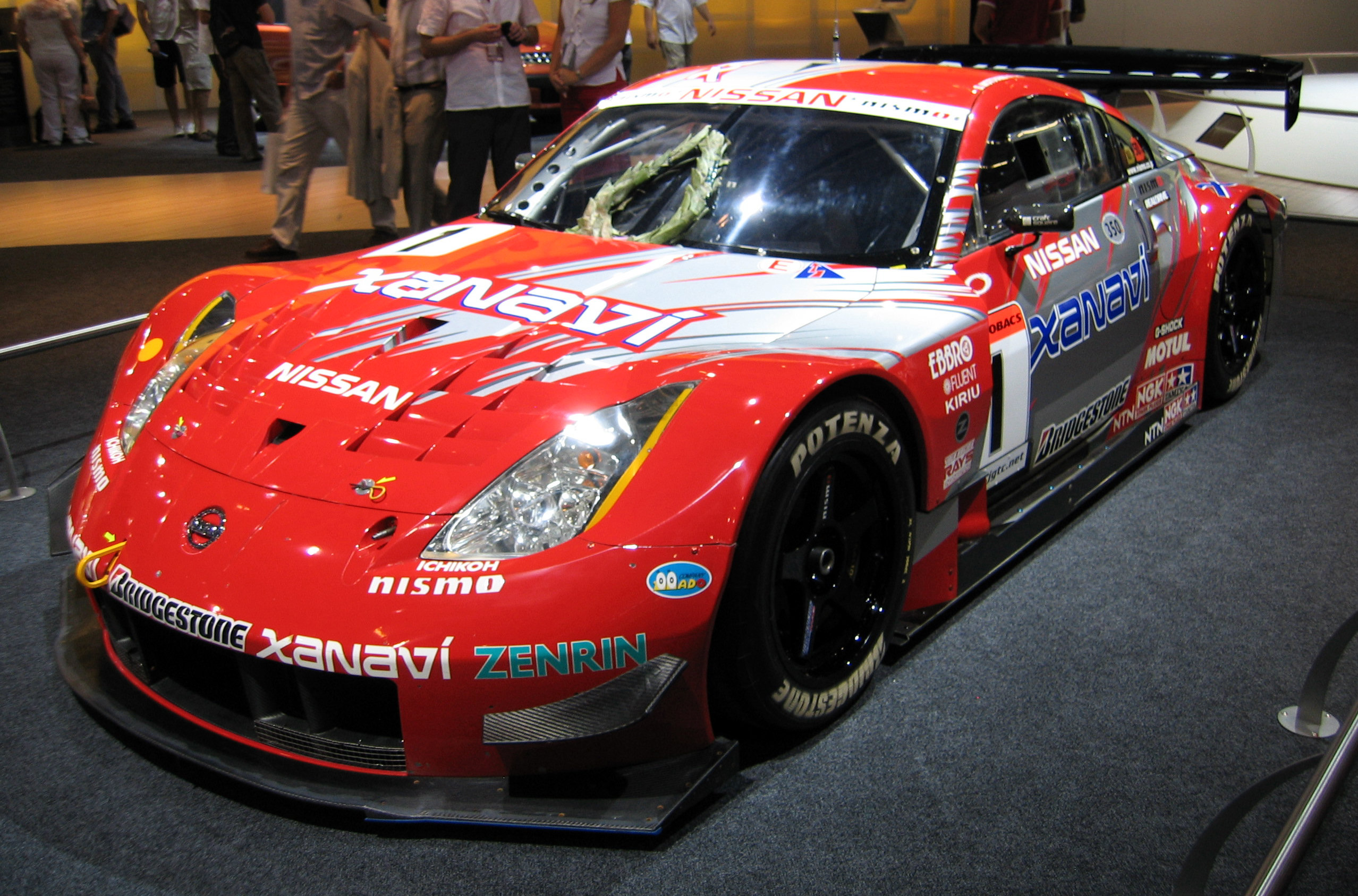
Xanavi Nissan 350Z GT at the 2006 British International Motor Show

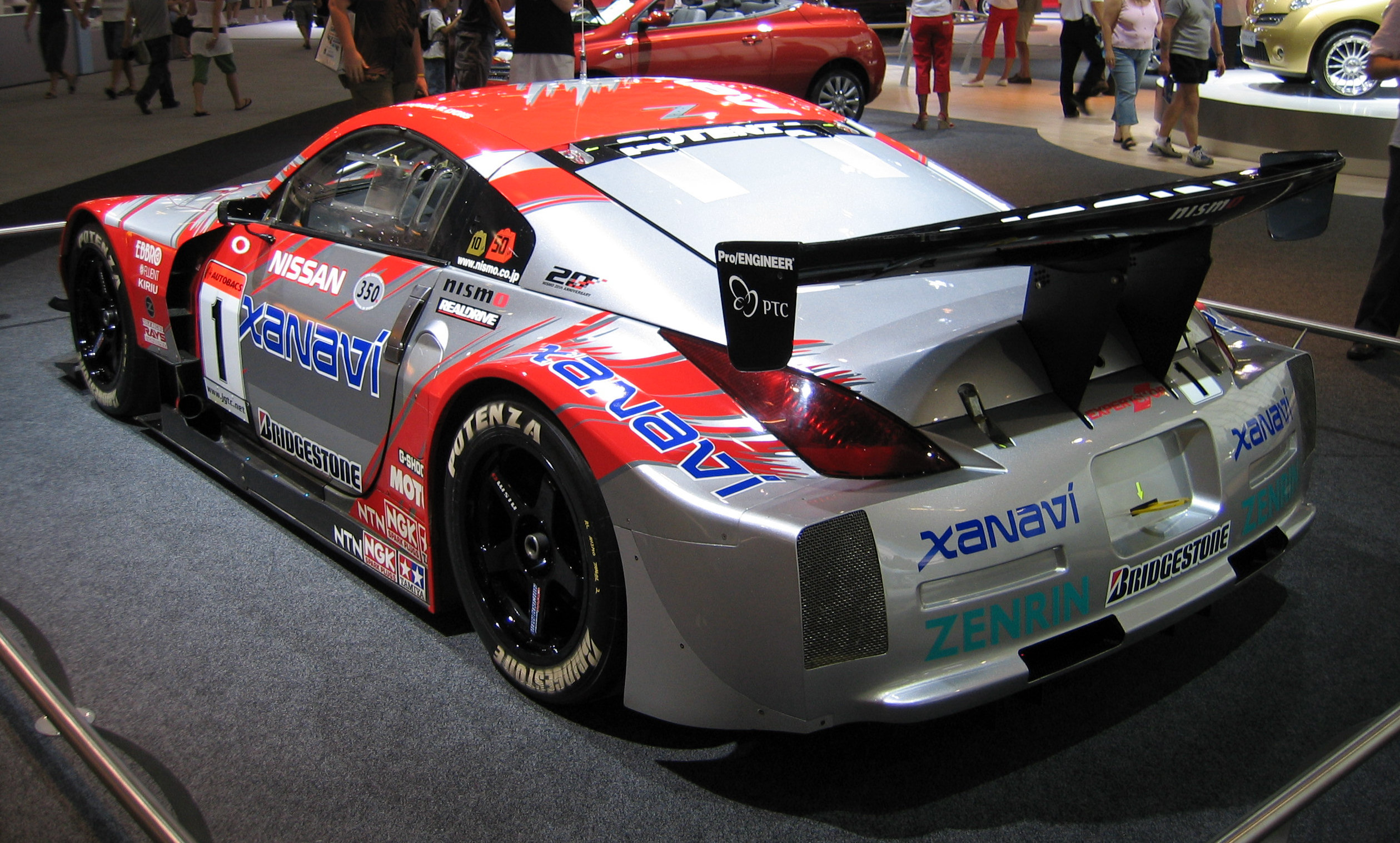
Xanavi 350Z, rear

The first generation Zs (240Z/260Z/280Z) proved to be very successful in many forms of racing. The S30s won many SCCA/IMSA championships and even became quite successful in rally and baja races.

- 1979 SCCA C Production Category (Bob Sharp Racing 280ZX)
- 1979 and 1980 IMSA GTU Championship (Electramotive Datsun 280ZX)
- 1982 and 1983 IMSA GTO Championship (Electramotive Datsun 280ZX Turbo)

The 1983 Electramotive 280ZX Turbo produced over 700 hp (522 kW), and reached a terminal speed of 140 mph (230 km/h) in the standing quarter mile.

The most notable driver to be associated with the car was actor Paul Newman, who raced with the Bob Sharp Racing team. He also helped to promote the car, even by starring in a series of commercials.

In 1984 to 1985 showroom stock racing, the 300ZX captured wins on numerous occasions. The car scored its only Trans Am win in 1986 at Lime Rock by Paul Newman for Bob Sharp Racing.

From 1985 to 1987, the Electromotive-developed GTP ZX-Turbo was raced in the IMSA GT Championship's GTP class and also the All Japan Sports Prototype Championship, badged as a Fairlady Z, using a Lola T810 chassis and a VG30ET engine. Following development through 1987, the car would become dominant in IMSA GT in 1988. Additional factory endorsement, combined with a new chassis, transmission and more reliable Goodyear tires contributed to the team's success. The SOHC VG30ET was making upwards of 1,000 hp (700 kW), with a power band that extended from 4000 to 9000 rpm on a single turbo. From 1990 to 1995, Steve Millen drove the twin-turbo 300ZX for Clayton Cunningham Racing. The car dominated the IMSA in its GTO, then later GTS categories due to its newly designed chassis and engine. Millen would rank as the #1 Factory Driver for Nissan for 7 years and earn two IMSA GTS Driving Championships and two IMSA GTS Manufacturer's Championships. Among enthusiasts and the team themselves, the biggest triumph for the race Z32 was the victory in the 24 Hours of Daytona. In the same year at the 24 Hours of Le Mans, the 300ZX ranked first in the GTS-1 class and 5th overall. In an attempt to level the playing field in the GTS-1 class by reducing the allowable horsepower, the IMSA declared the twin turbo VG engine ineligible. The 1995 GTS 300ZX car would debut with the V8 Nissan VH engine at Daytona and would place first in the GTS-1 class at the 12 Hours of Sebring and Mosehead Grand Prix in Halifax.

The JUN-BLITZ Bonneville Z32 holds the E/BMS class land speed record of 419.84 km/h (260.88 mph) set at the 1995 Bonneville Speed Trial. The vehicle was built as a partnership between JUN Auto and BLITZ. This record remains unbroken. In 1990, JUN's first Z32 went 339.2 km/h at their Yatabe test course and hit 373 km/h after some tuning at Bonneville.

The 350Z replaced the Skyline GT-R and Silvia as the car for Nissan's factory and customer teams in the JGTC/Super GT's GT500 class and GT300 class respectively. The GT500 cars used were heavily modified and featured a longer nose and tail (requiring the production of the Type-E homologation special), carbon fiber bodywork, and a tube chassis. In 2004, Nismo won the GT500 championship. Until the 2007 season, the car was powered by a VQ30DETT V6. In order to increase competitiveness, however, a new 4.5L V8 powerplant has been developed. The 350Z, with slightly more pedestrian modifications also competes in the GT300 class (having started there even before the Skyline GT-Rs were replaced) by teams such as Endless Sports and Mola. In 2003 Hasemi Sports won the GT300 championship with the 350Z. In 2008 season, the 350Zs were all replaced by Nissan GT-Rs in the GT500 class, but they have continued to be used in the GT300 class as the GT-Rs exceed the horsepower limits which make it impossible to participate. Thus, two 350Zs competed in the series and MOLA won both Drivers' and Teams' championships in the GT300 class. Two years later, Hasemi Sports won the 2010 GT300 title again before its team's withdrawal of the series in the following season, as another 350Z team MOLA also moved up to GT500 class earlier in the preseason time, it marked the first full absence of Nissan vehicles in GT300 class since the establishment of JGTC in 1994.

The Z33 is also popular in import drag racing; one fielded by Performance Motorsport in the NHRA Sports Compact series, with twin turbo claims to put out over 1,700 bhp (1,268 kW; 1,724 PS) and achieved 8.33 quarter mile time with its best speed of 176.72 mph (284.40 km/h). Another Z33 built by Injected Performance holds the record as the highest horsepower, street legal Z33 and highest horsepower single turbo VQ35DE with a quarter mile time of 8.80 with a speed of 163 mph (262 km/h). This car was also featured on the March 2008 cover of Turbo Magazine. Lazcano Racing's 370Z is powered by a Nissan VG30DETT engine and has recorded a 1/4 mile time of 6.0 at over 226 MPH.

== ZCON ==
ZCON is an annual Z-Car convention that is held around the United States of America each year (since 1988). It is considered the largest annual gathering of Z car clubs and enthusiasts in America, sponsored by Nissan. The convention is put together each year by a host club and supported by the ZCCA (Z Car Club Association).
