= Bob Sharp (racing driver) =

American racing driver (1939–2025)

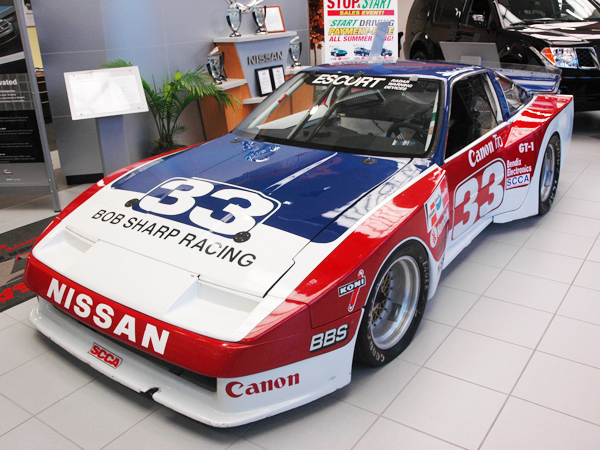
a Bob Sharp Racing car

Bob Sharp (March 11, 1939 – February 28, 2025) was an American racing driver and owner of Bob Sharp Racing. Bob was the father of Scott Sharp, an American professional racing driver, who is best known for his years as a competitor in the Indy Racing League.

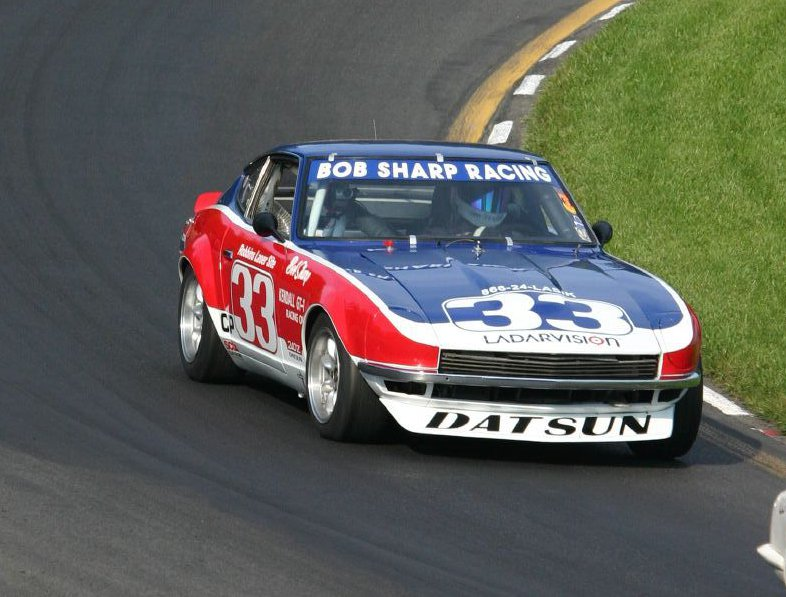
Sharp's Datsun

Between 1967 and 1975, Sharp won the Sports Car Club of America national championships six times, (in B-Sedan, F-Production and C-Production) and the IMSA GTU title, racing for Datsun, whose cars he also sold. One of his main motivations to campaign Datsuns was, he said, "You race cars to sell cars." His success with racing drove his Connecticut dealership to go from selling 200 Datsuns per year to selling 2000.

In 1960, after serving in the Army and while attending college, Sharp began racing his 1960 Austin-Healey "bug-eye" Sprite, in spite of it being his "daily driver" used to go back and forth to school. While his time at Nichols College was wrapping up, his racing and Datsun owner's club started earning him customers from Boston to Philadelphia, with the dealership becoming known for its racing-inspired attention to detail.

Bob, who was the premier Datsun racer on the East Coast, introduced Paul Newman to competitive driving in 1971. By the following year, Newman joined Bob Sharp Racing, driving one of Bob's 510 B-sedans, and they spent many weekdays at Lime Rock Park discussing racing, while Paul got comfortable with the new Datsun car. Sharp died on February 28, 2025, at the age of 85.

== SCCA National Championship Runoffs ==
Year	Track	Car	Engine	Class	Finish	Start	Status
1964	Riverside	Nissan	Nissan	G Production	10		Retired
1965	Daytona	Nissan	Nissan	G Production	3	4	Running
1966	Riverside	Nissan SRL311	Nissan	F Production	14	1	Retired
1966	Riverside	Nissan	Nissan	G Production	5		Running
1967	Daytona	Nissan	Nissan	F Production	1	3	Running
1967	Daytona	Nissan	Nissan	C Production	12	3	Running
1968	Riverside	Nissan SPL311	Nissan	F Production	2	3	Running
1968	Riverside	Nissan SPL311	Nissan	C Production	16	4	Retired
1969	Daytona	Nissan SRL311U	Nissan	D Production	4	4	Running
1969	Daytona	Nissan SRL311U	Nissan	F Production	5	9	Running
1970	Road Atlanta	Nissan 240Z	Nissan	C Production	2	4	Running
1971	Road Atlanta	Nissan 510	Nissan	B Sedan	1	1	Running
1971	Road Atlanta	Nissan 240Z	Nissan	C Production	2	2	Running
1972	Road Atlanta	Nissan 240Z	Nissan	C Production	1	1	Running
1972	Road Atlanta	Nissan 510	Nissan	B Sedan	1	1	Running
1973	Road Atlanta	Nissan 610	Nissan	B Sedan	21	1	Retired
1973	Road Atlanta	Nissan 240Z	Nissan	C Production	1	1	Running
1974	Road Atlanta	Nissan 260Z	Nissan	C Production	3	5	Running
1974	Road Atlanta	Nissan 610	Nissan	B Sedan	2	2	Running
1975	Road Atlanta	Nissan 280Z	Nissan	C Production	1	1	Running
1975	Road Atlanta	Nissan 610	Nissan	B Sedan	2	3	Running
