= Nissan D engine =

D engine

Overview
- Manufacturer: Nissan Machinery
- Production: 1964-

Layout
- Configuration: Naturally aspirated Inline-4
- Displacement: 1.0–1.2 L; 63.8–72.6 cu in (1,046–1,189 cc)
- Cylinder bore: 70 mm (2.76 in); 73 mm (2.87 in)
- Piston stroke: 68 mm (2.68 in)
- Valvetrain: Pushrod
- Compression ratio: 8.0:1

Combustion
- Fuel system: Single Carburetor
- Fuel type: Petrol
- Cooling system: Water-cooled

Output
- Power output: 40–56 PS (29–41 kW)
- Torque output: 48 N⋅m (35 lb⋅ft)

Dimensions
- Dry weight: 137.5 kg (303 lb)

The Nissan D-series is a series of overhead valve engines produced by Nissan, starting in 1964 with the 1.05-liter D engine. Similar to a number of British and other Datsun engines, it may have been derived from an Ohta design which also found its way into some Kurogane vehicles - both of these companies were acquired by Nissan in the early 1960s.

== D (D10) ==
The D type engine was introduced for the 1964 update of the Datsun Cablight (A122). This engine displaces 1.0 L; 63.8 cu in (1,046 cc). Its internal dimensions are unknown, but the displacement is the same as the E-10 engine made by Tokyu Kogyo Kurogane from 1959 until 1962; this engine was originally developed by Ohta. The E-10 engine has a bore and stroke of 70 mm × 68 mm (2.76 in × 2.68 in); sharing the same stroke as in the latter D11 engine. The D engine, unlike other Nissan engines of the period, also has its distributor mounted between the second and third cylinders rather than towards the back of the engine. Kurogane was taken over by Nissan in 1962 and the Datsun Cablight was a continuation of the Kurogane Mighty, which had already used the E-10 engine in the Mighty NC model.

=== Applications ===
- 1964 Datsun Cablight A122, A220

== D11 ==
The D11 is a 1.1 L; 69.4 cu in (1,138 cc) pushrod, three main bearing, inline-four with wedge combustion chambers, a bore and stroke of 73 mm × 68 mm (2.87 in × 2.68 in), a compression ratio of 8.0:1, and was rated at 29 PS (21 kW) at 2800 rpm (D11-PU 41-U model). It weighed 137.5 kg (303 lb). Similar to the E & J series, and Austin A series in layout, it had a gear-driven cam drive similar to the larger SD series diesels; it was used in Datsun FG003 forklifts in the 1960s and then in the NFG101C-103C forklifts in the 1970s. These later industrial applications produce 27 PS (20 kW) at 2800 rpm.

=== Applications ===
- 1964–1968 Datsun Cablight A220 & A221

== D12 ==
The D12 is a 1.2 L; 72.6 cu in (1,189 cc) version of Nissan/Datsun's D-series inline-four. It produces 56 PS (41 kW) at 4800 rpm.

=== Applications ===
- 1968–1970 Datsun Cabstar A320

== See also ==
- List of Nissan engines
