= Datsun Sports =

1960s roadster made by Nissan

Datsun Fairlady/Sports
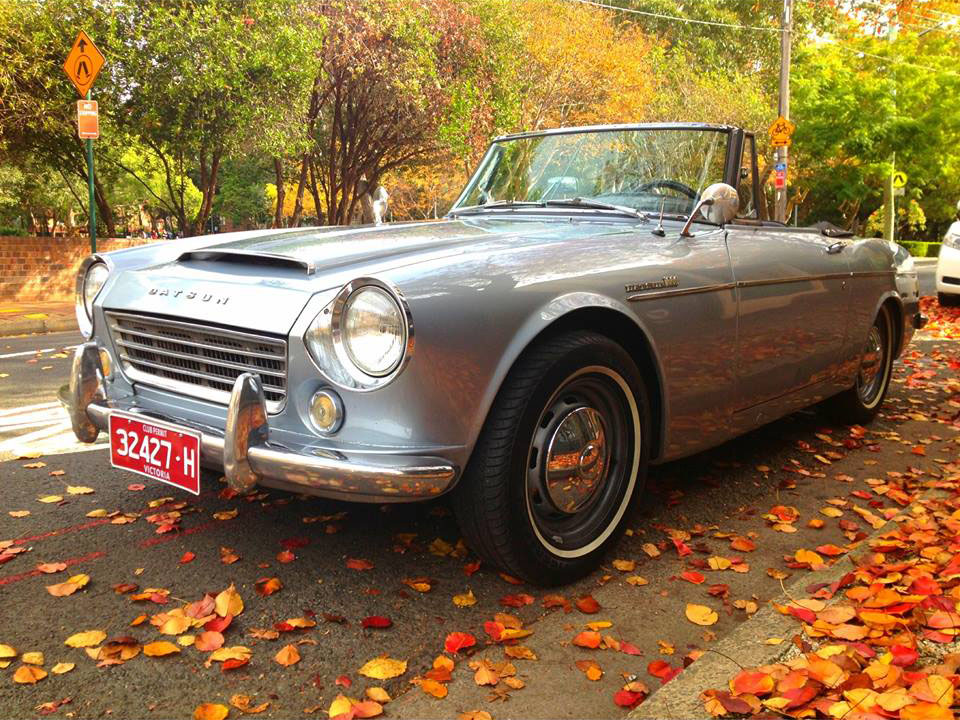
- Datsun Fairlady 1600

Overview
- Manufacturer: Nissan
- Production: 1959–April 1970 circa 40,000 produced
- Assembly: Yokohama Plant, Kanagawa-ku, Yokohama, Japan (Tonouchi Industrial: 1958–1960); Hiratsuka, Kanagawa (Nissan Shatai Plant: 1960–1970)
- Designer: Yuichi Ōta

Body and chassis
- Class: Sports car
- Body style: 2-door Roadster
- Layout: FR layout

Chronology
- Predecessor: Datsun DC-3
- Successor: Nissan Z-car

The Datsun Sports (called Datsun Fairlady in the Japanese and Australian markets and simply given a numerical designation alone in other export markets), was a series of roadsters produced by Nissan in the 1960s. The series was a predecessor to the Z-car in the Fairlady line, and offered a competitor to the European MG, Triumph, Fiat and Alfa Romeo sports cars. Beginning with the 1959 S211, the line was built in two generations: the first generation was largely handbuilt in small numbers, while the second generation (310 series) was series produced. The second generation first appeared in 1961 and continued through 1970 with the SP311 and SR311 lines.

In Japan, it represented one of three core products offered by Nissan at Japanese Nissan dealerships, called Nissan Shop, alongside the Datsun Truck and the Bluebird (1000). The second generation Fairlady, called the Datsun 2000 in export, was the two-seat roadster that made their name, fitted with a potent 1,982 cc overhead cam engine with dual SU type side draft carbs and a five-speed transmission. Actor Paul Newman started his racing career in one.

== First generation ==
=== S211 ===
Sports 1000 S211
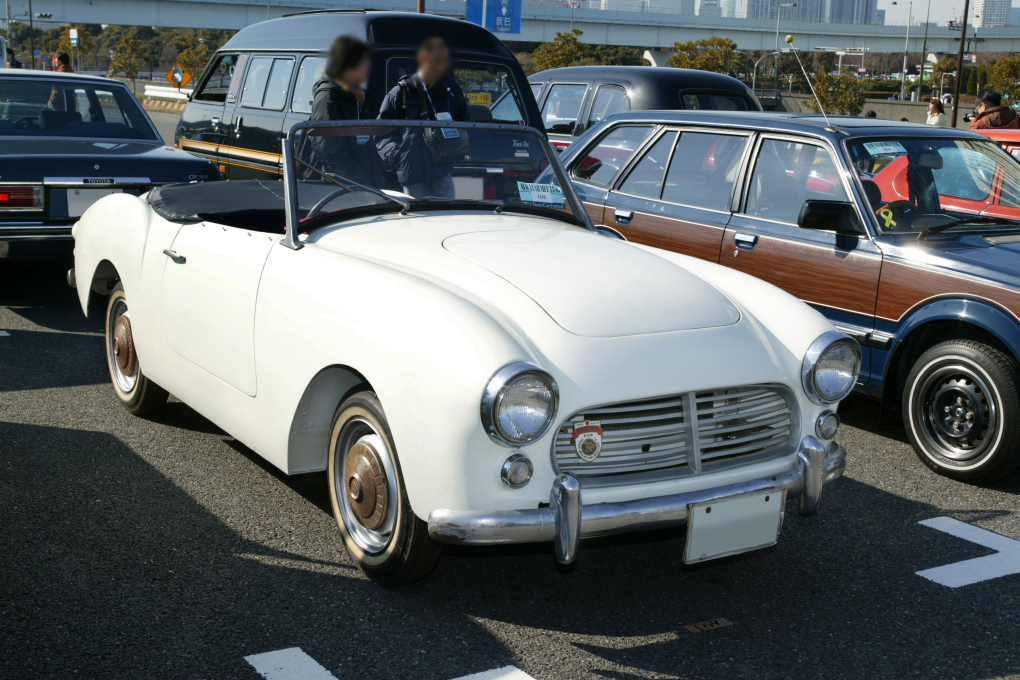

Overview
- Production: 1959–1960; 20 produced
- Designer: Yuichi Ohta

Body and chassis
- Related: Datsun Bluebird 211; Datsun Truck 220

Powertrain
- Engine: 988 cc C I4
- Transmission: 4 speed manual

Dimensions
- Wheelbase: 2,220 mm (87.4 in)
- Length: 3,895 mm (153.3 in)
- Width: 1,455 mm (57.3 in)
- Height: 1,350 mm (53.1 in)

The first Datsun Sports model was the 1959 S211. It used a 988 cc C-series straight-4 producing 37 PS (27 kW; 36 hp). The S211 was based on the Datsun 211 sedan. Incorporated into the side trim were the side badges, which said "Datsun 1000". It was designed by Yuichi Ohta, who had previously designed the Datsun DC-3 and the prototype to the S211, the A80X. Both the A80X and S211 featured fiberglass bodywork, influenced by the Chevrolet Corvette. Only 20 examples of the S211 were built, making the S211 the rarest of all Datsun Sports models.

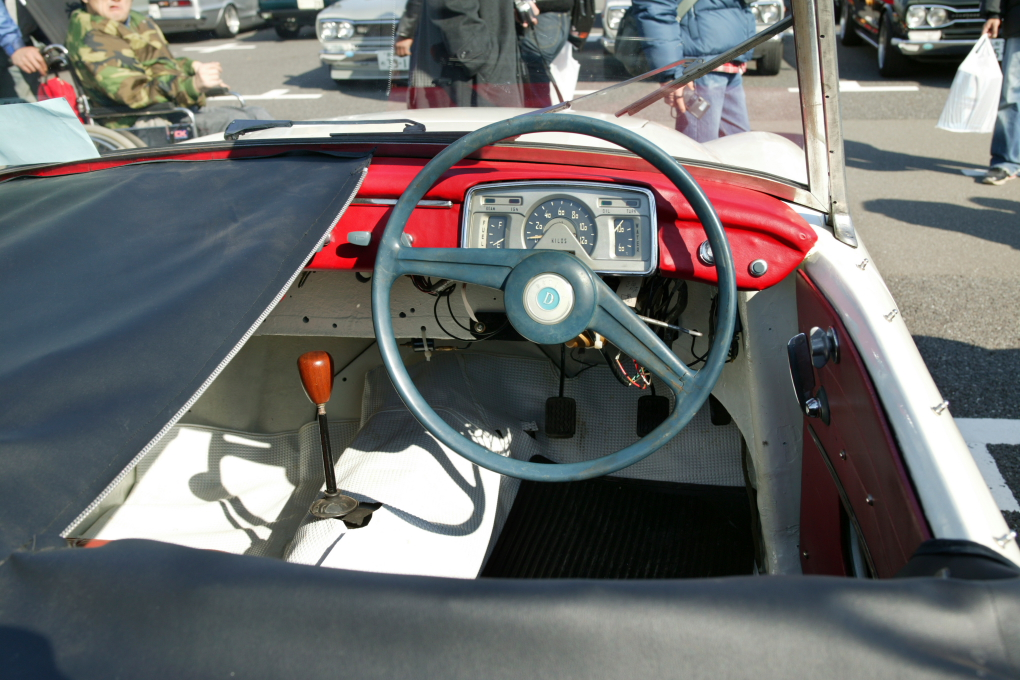
Datsun S211, with provision for side curtains

=== SPL212/SPL213 ===
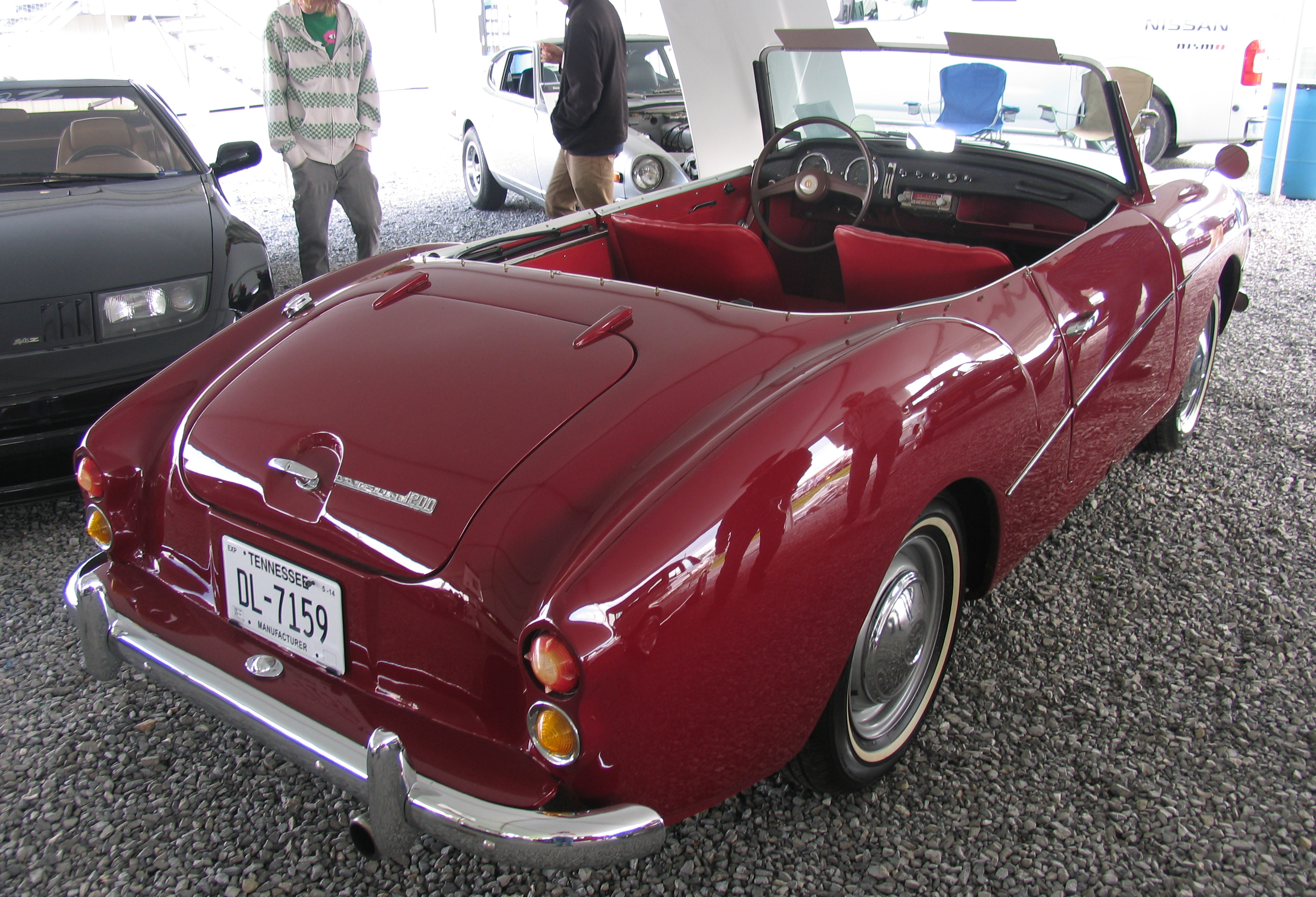
Datsun Fairlady 1200 rear

Fairlady / Sports 1200 SPL212/SPL213
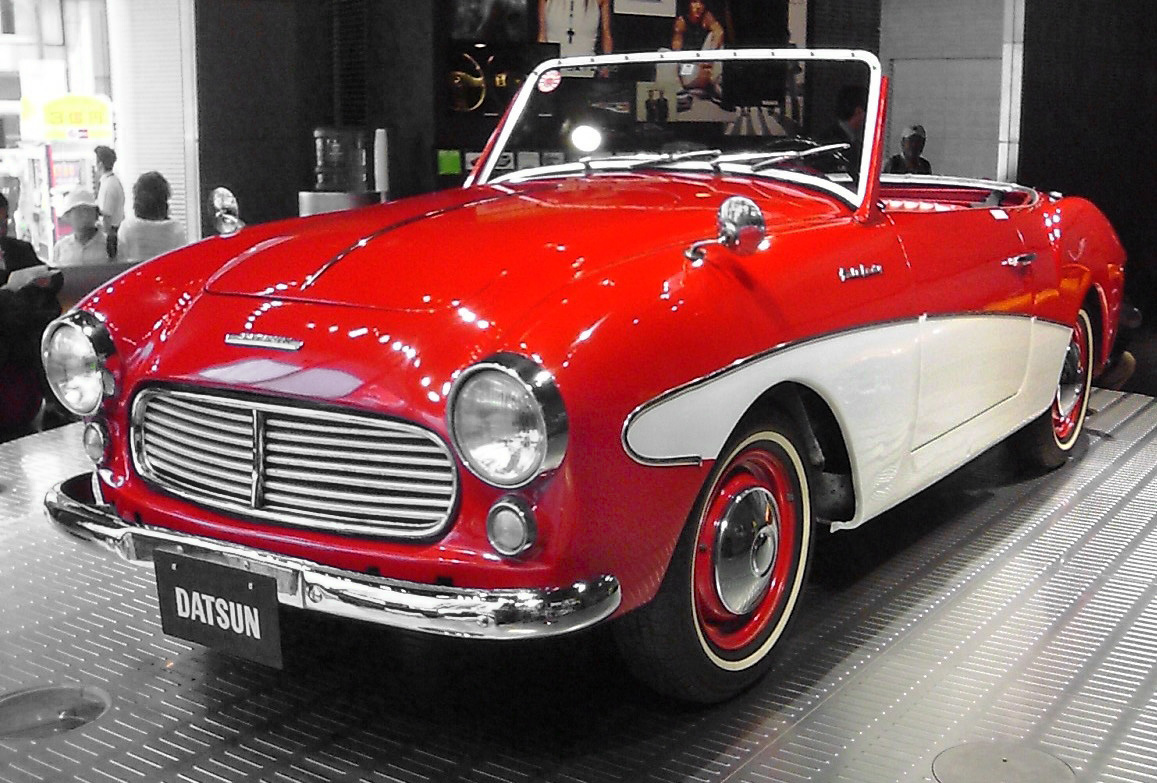

Overview
- Production: 1960–1962; 495 produced

Body and chassis
- Related: Datsun 223 Pickup; Datsun 1000

Powertrain
- Engine: 1.2 L E I4 (SPL212); 1.2 L E-1 I4 (SPL213)
- Transmission: 4-speed manual

Dimensions
- Wheelbase: 2,220 mm (87.4 in)
- Length: 4,025 mm (158.5 in)
- Width: 1,475 mm (58.1 in)
- Height: 1,380 mm (54.3 in)

The SPL212 was introduced in 1960. This was the first Datsun sports car imported to the US. The letter L means "left hand drive". Now with steel bodywork, it was built in slightly higher volume than the S211, with 288 produced through 1961. The SPL212 was based on the Datsun 223 truck. It had a 1.2 L (1189 cc) E-series straight-4 engine producing 48 PS (35 kW; 47 hp). A 4-speed manual transmission was specified, and an a-arm suspension with torsion bars was used in front. Drum brakes were used all around. This was the first vehicle to bear the "Fairlady" name. The badge on the trunk lid was the same badge that was used on the Datsun 223 truck. It was named in reference to the Broadway musical My Fair Lady. The SPL212 and later SPL213 were sold only on the export market; they were named for their engine displacement. In 1960, production of the Fairlady was moved from Yokohama to the Nissan Shatai plant in Hiratsuka.

These cars are quite valuable. In 1996 a set of unrestored cars (SPL212) sold for US$100,000.

The SPL213, produced in 1961 and 1962, is very similar to the SPL212. The main difference is the dual-carburetor "E-1" engine which pumped out 60 PS (44 kW; 59 hp), a large increase in such a small and light car. Like the SPL212, the SPL213 was based on the Datsun 223 truck. 217 examples were built.

== Second generation ==
The second generation Fairlady made its debut at the Tokyo Motor show in 1961, several months before the roll-out of the similar looking MGB. The second generation was designed for mass production, unlike the mostly handbuilt original model. It was sold as the Datsun 1500/1600/2000 Roadster in most export markets. Particularly the 1600 and 2000 Roadsters became regular winners on the Sports Car Club of America (SCCA) circuit, winning 10 national SCCA championships. The 1600 and 2000 were produced until 1970 when they were superseded by the 240Z.

=== SP310/SPL310 ===
Fairlady/Sports 1500 SPL310/SP310
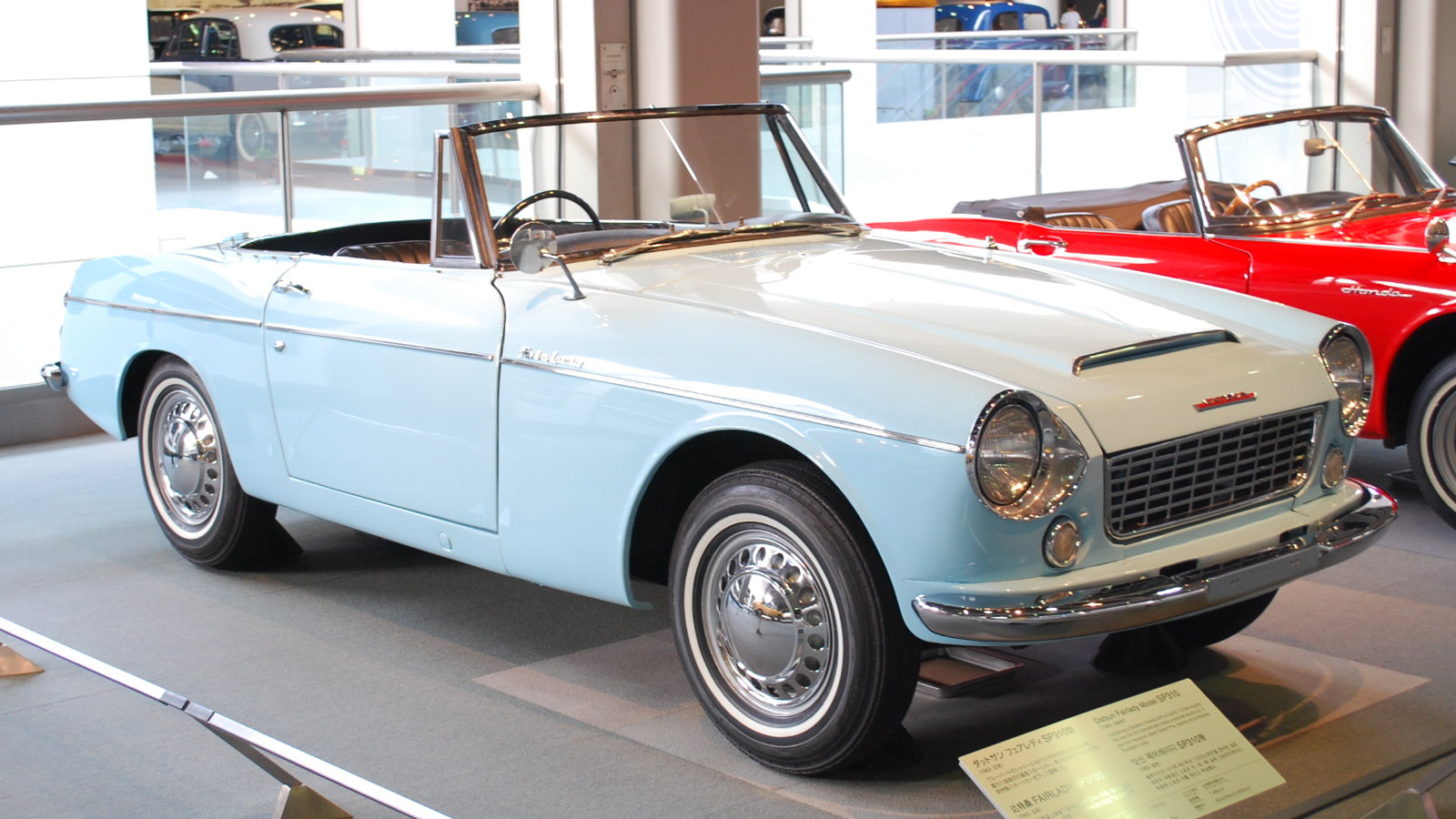

Overview
- Also called: Datsun 1500
- Production: August 1963–January 1965

Body and chassis
- Body style: convertible
- Related: Datsun Bluebird 310; Nissan Cedric 30; Datsun Truck 320

Powertrain
- Engine: 1.5 L G15 I4
- Transmission: 4-speed manual

Dimensions
- Wheelbase: 2,280 mm (89.8 in)
- Length: 3,953 mm (155.6 in)
- Width: 1,495 mm (58.9 in)
- Height: 1,275 mm (50.2 in)

The first true Datsun sports car was the 1963 SP310 "Fairlady 1500" model (right hand drive), and the SPL310 (left hand drive). In America it was known as the Datsun 1500. The SP310 was based on a modified Bluebird 310 sedan platform instead of the truck platform of earlier models. It featured a 1.5 L (1,497 cc) G15 OHV engine (from the Cedric) but with a single SU carburettor and 77 PS (57 kW). After the first 300 SPL310's had been built, a dual SU carb models with 85 PS (63 kW) was introduced for 1964 and 1965. A four-speed manual transmission was the only shifting option and has a non-syncro'd first gear. The rear axle used the shafts and differential also from the Cedric. It was a well-equipped car with a transistor radio, tonneau cover, map lights, and a clock. The first SP310s (1963–1964) were three-seaters, with a unique transverse single seat in the rear and buckets in front. The final revision of the 1500 model occurred in 1965 with a completely redesigned interior which eliminated the back seat and introduced a more sporty dash layout.

Marketing

To coincide with the 1964 Summer Olympics, Nissan established the gallery on the second and third floors of the San-ai building, located in Ginza, Tokyo. To attract visitors, Nissan started using beautiful female showroom attendants where Nissan held a competition to choose five candidates as the first class of Nissan Miss Fairladys, modeled after "Datsun Demonstrators" from the 1930s who introduced cars. The Fairlady name was used as a link to the popular Broadway play of the era My Fair Lady. Miss Fairladys became the marketers of Datsun Fair Lady 1500.

=== SP311/SPL311 ===
Fairlady/Sports 1600 SPL311/SP311
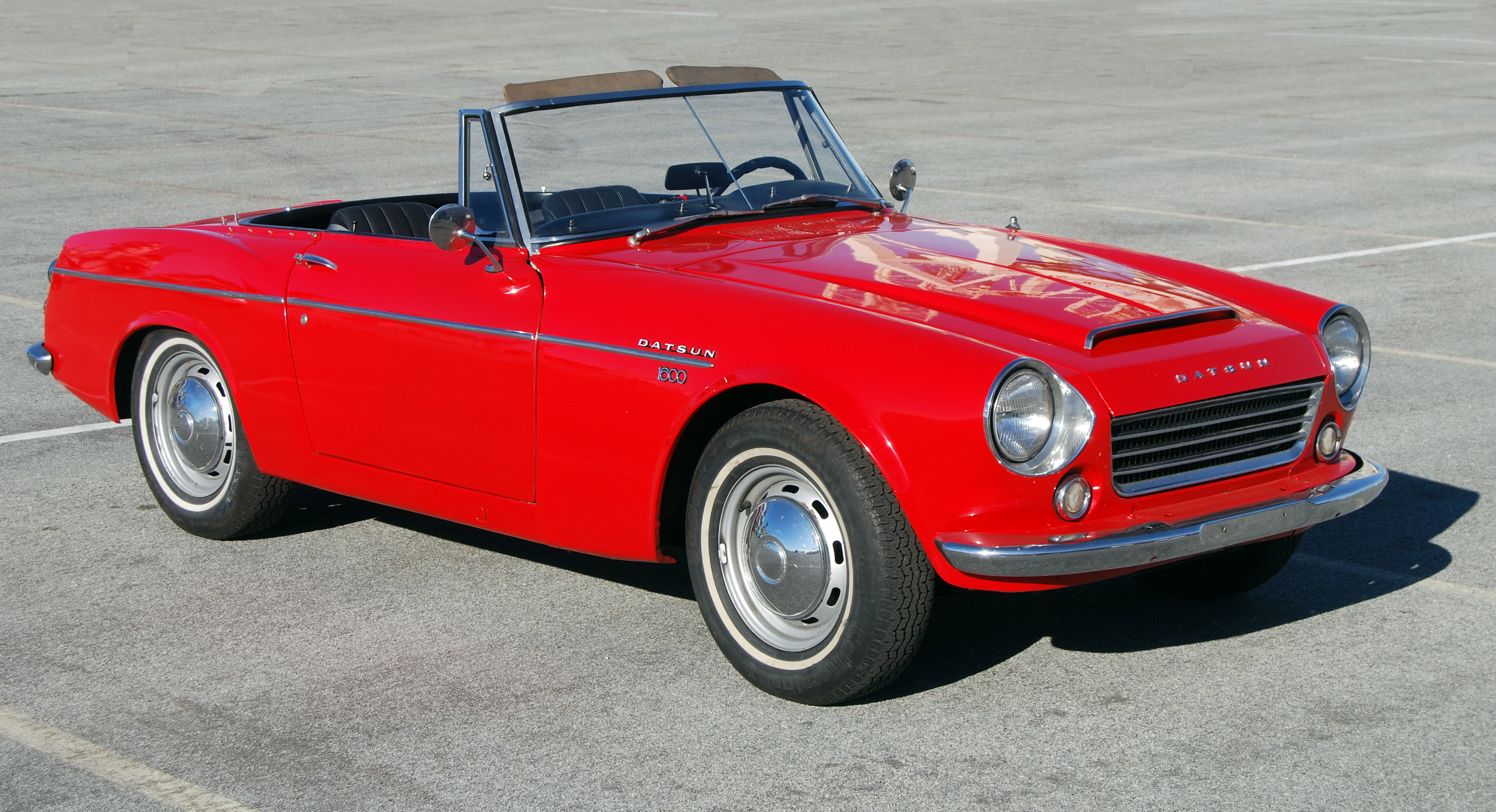
- Pre-facelift model

Overview
- Also called: Datsun 1600
- Production: January 1965–April 1970

Body and chassis
- Body style: 2-door convertible
- Related: Nissan Silvia CSP311

Powertrain
- Engine: 1.6 L R16 I4
- Transmission: 4-speed synchromesh manual

Dimensions
- Wheelbase: 2,280 mm (89.8 in)
- Length: 3,955 mm (155.7 in)
- Width: 1,495 mm (58.9 in)
- Height: 1,300 mm (51.2 in)

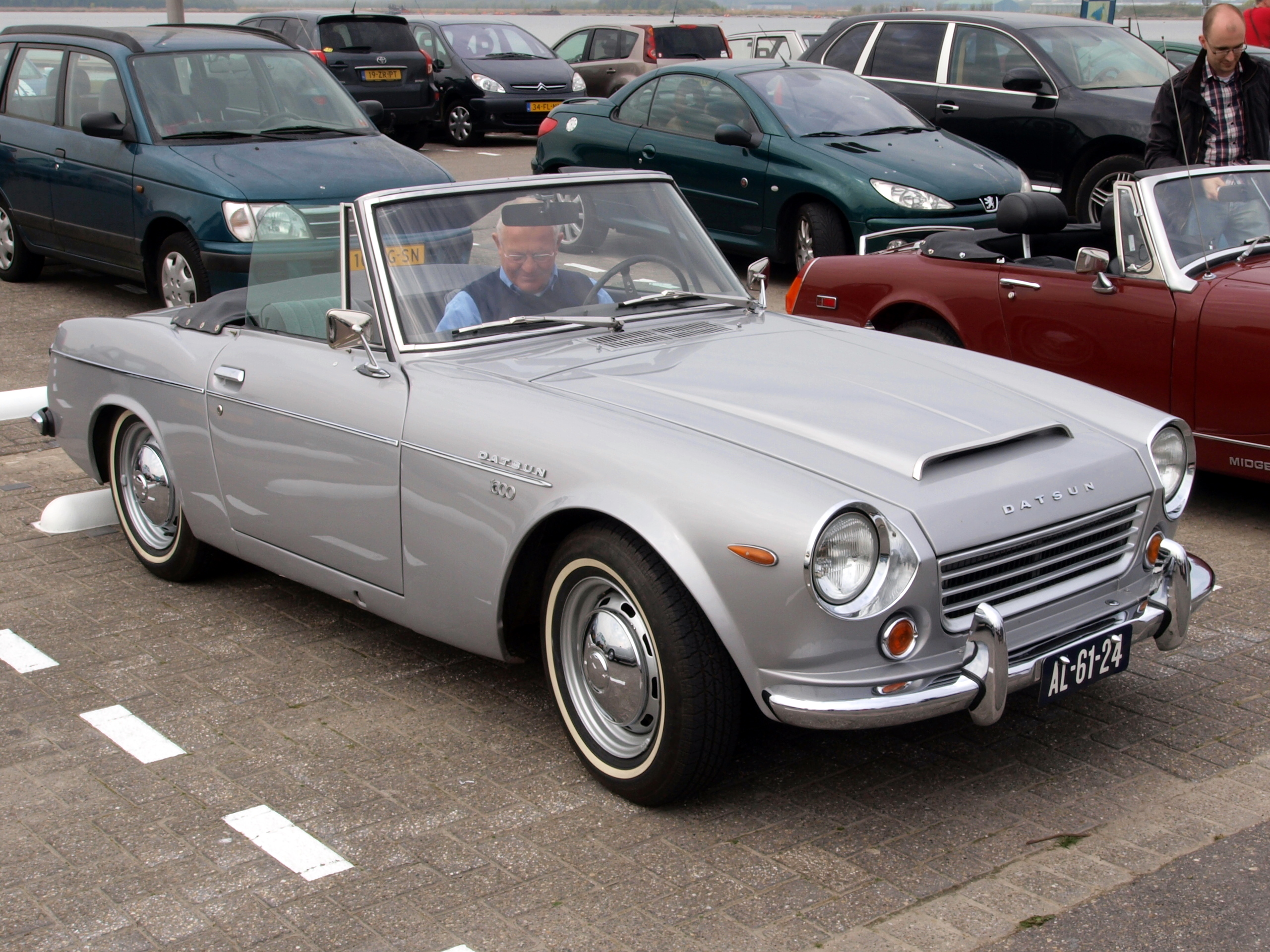
Facelifted Datsun 1600 roadster (1969)

Many changes were made in 1965. Though the 1.5 L SP310 continued in production through January, a new 1.6 L R16-powered SP311 and SPL311 (left-hand drive) replaced it. The new model was first shown at the 1964 Tokyo Motor Show, but did not enter production until March 1965. The restyling was executed in part by Count Albrecht Goertz, who would later be involved with designing the first Fairlady Z. Marketed as the Fairlady 1600, or the Datsun Sports 1600 in many export markets including North America, it featured 14 inch wheels and minor exterior changes. The SPL311 was also known as the "Roadster" on the West Coast of the United States. The front suspension was independent, using coil springs over hydraulic shocks. Rear suspension was a common leaf springs design, damped with hydraulic shocks. The 1600 SPL311 came with a pair of SU carburettors. The engine produced 96 PS (71 kW; 95 hp). The R16 is an in-line four cylinder OHV engine. Early SPL311 came with a high compression engine that had three main bearings, hydraulic lifters, a cast iron block and cast iron head. Timing of the distributor could be easily adjusted to reduce pre-ignition knock and thereby tune for questionable quality gasoline. Engines in later SPL311 had 5 main bearings and this addressed a design weakness. Top speed for the SPL311 with approximately 91 octane gasoline was approximately 105 mph. The axle gearing suffered from design limitations and Datsun performance parts offered a cooling system as a retrofit. Steering used a worm gear design. The hood badge said "Datsun" in individual letters, the rear badge said "Datsun 1600", and the side badges said "Fairlady" (Japanese market) or "Datsun 1600" (export market). The SP311 continued in production alongside the later 2000 model through April 1970.

The first Nissan Silvia coupe shared the SP311's platform. The CSP311 Silvia had an R16 engine developing 96 hp and used a modified Fairlady chassis. The Silvia was the first car fitted with Nissan's new R engine. The R engine was a further development of the 1,488 cc G engine.

Early in 1968 the 1600, just as the bigger 2000, was updated to meet new safety legislation. Toggle switches, a padded dashboard and padded center of the steering wheel were new inside. The door handles were changed to flush fit lifting units, while the windshield was taller with a top mounted internal rear view mirror.

=== SR311/SRL311 ===
Fairlady/Sports 2000 SRL311/SR311
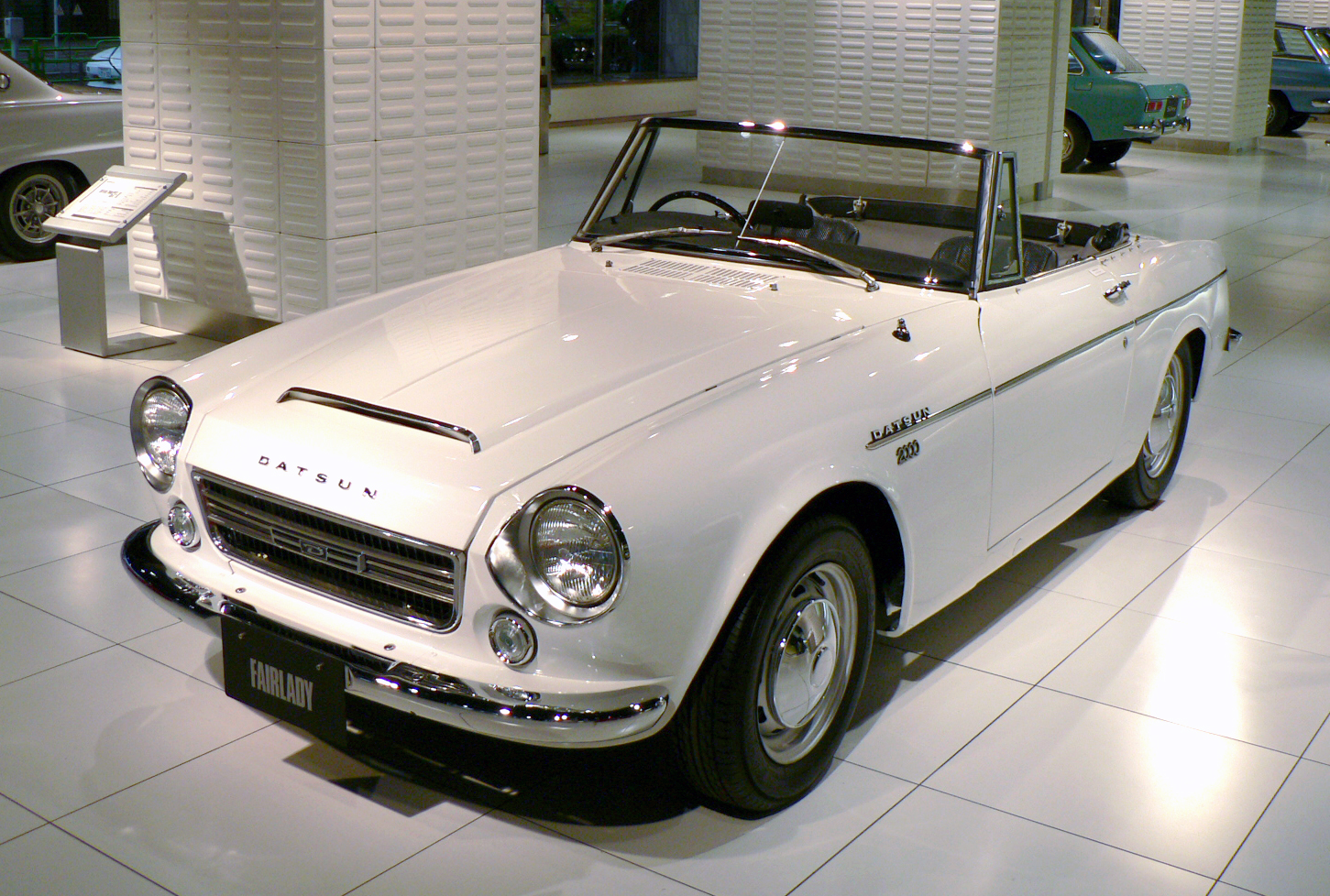

Overview
- Also called: Datsun 2000
- Production: March 1967–April 1970

Powertrain
- Engine: 2.0 L U20 SOHC I4
- Transmission: 5-speed manual

Dimensions
- Wheelbase: 2,280 mm (89.8 in)
- Length: 3,955 mm (155.7 in)
- Width: 1,495 mm (58.9 in)
- Height: 1,325 mm (52.2 in)
- Curb weight: 950 kg (2,094 lb)

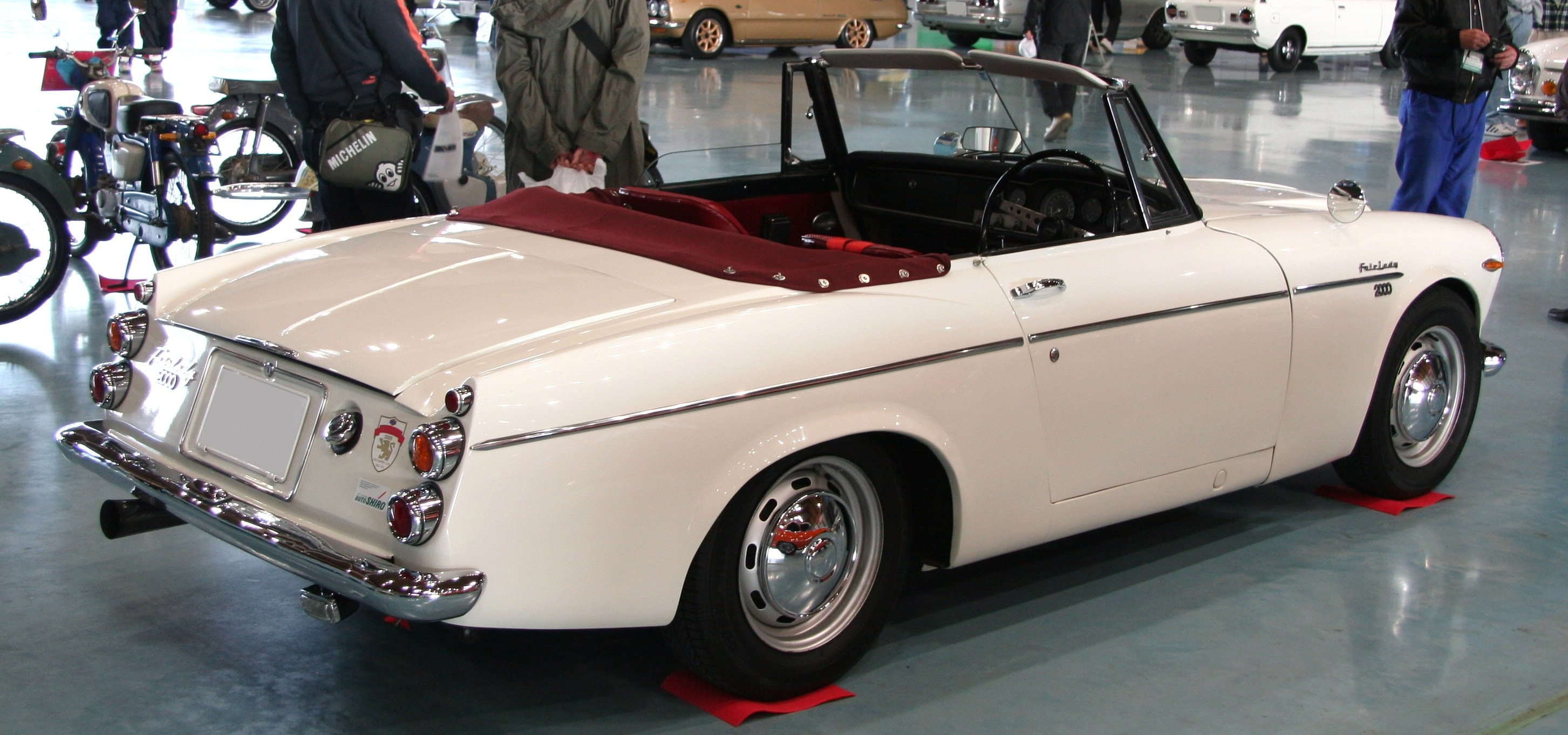
Datsun Fairlady 2000 rear

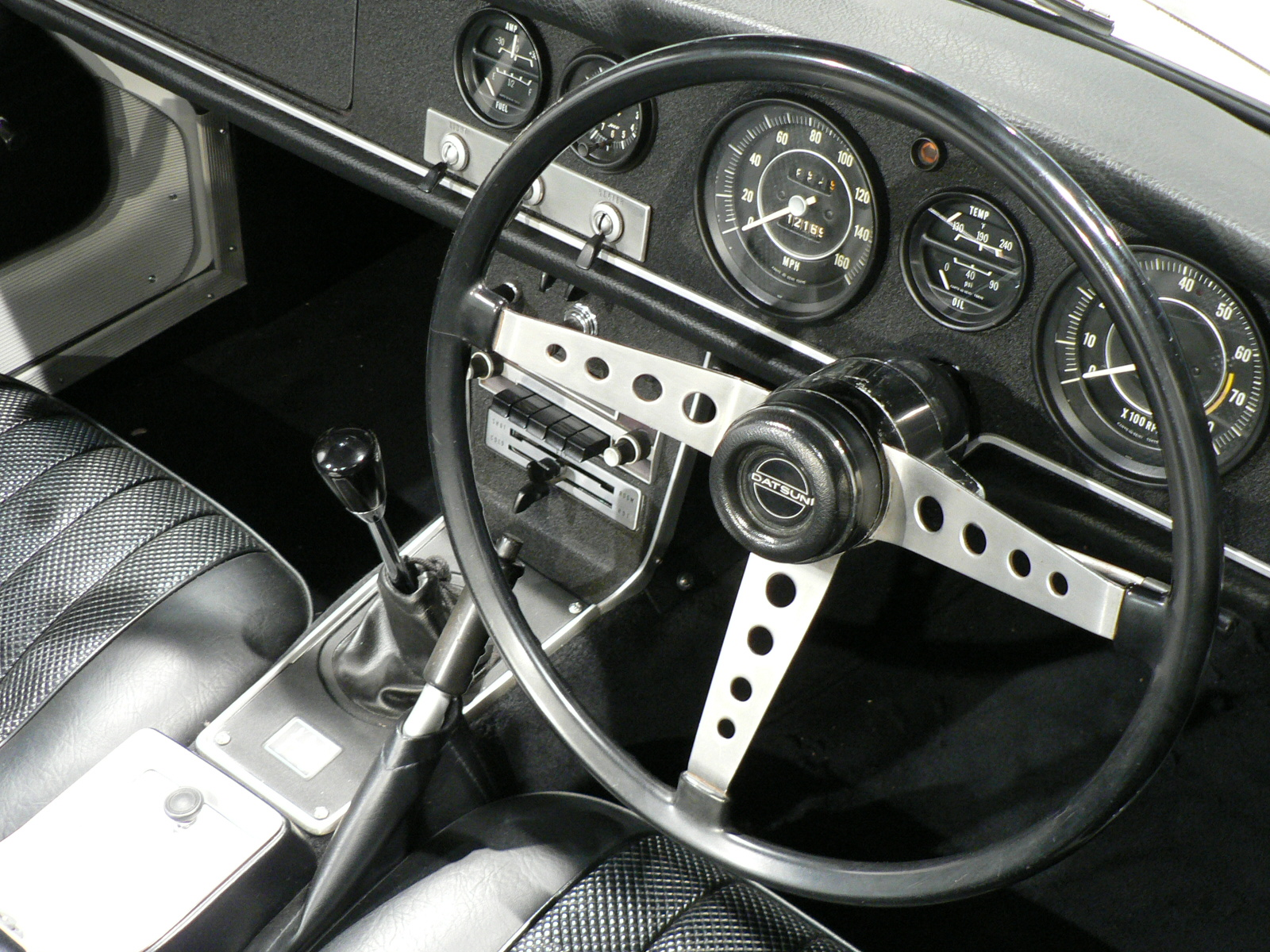
Datsun Fairlady 2000 interior

The introduction of the 1967 SR311 and SRL311 saw a major update. Produced from March 1967 until April 1970, the SR311 used a 2.0 L (1,982 cc) U20 engine and offered a five-speed manual transmission, somewhat unexpected for a production car at the time. The first-year cars (known as "half year" cars) are sought as there were fewer than 1,000 produced which are unencumbered with the 1968 model year emissions and safety changes. The inline, four-cylinder U20 engine had a cast iron block and aluminum alloy head. This new SOHC engine produced, for 1968 to 1970, 135 hp (101 kW; 137 PS) SAE gross in original trim. An optional Competition package included dual Mikuni/Solex carburetors and a special "B" model camshaft for 150 hp (112 kW; 152 PS) SAE gross; the package also provided higher limit gauges and a license plate surround. In Australia there were no emission restrictions at the time and all 2.0-litre cars were fitted with the Competition package as standard.

Cars with the 2.0 litre engine in Japan were regarded as expensive, specialized, sports cars due to the annual road tax obligation.

The Datsun 2000 was lauded as a bargain sports car. It was raced by John Morton, Bob Sharp and others. Its sticker price was lowest in its class, but it won its class in C Production (Mikuni-Solex carburetors) and D-Production (Hitachi-SU carburetors) in SCCA racing on a consistent basis even after production stopped.

==== 1968 facelift ====
For the 1968 model year the entire line was updated with a new body featuring a taller integrated windshield with an integrated rear-view mirror, a padded dashboard with non-toggle switches, built-in headrests, and lifting door handles. This version was first shown at the 14th Tokyo Motor Show in October 1967 and was developed to meet the new Federal Motor Vehicle Safety Standards. In the US the engines were also fitted with new emissions controls, and the lesser 1600 continued as a companion model through the end of production. Australia had no such emission controls. On the TV Program Wheeler Dealers, Mike Brewer bought one from Gene Winfield. Ant Anstead repaired and improved the car.
