= Step test =

Step test can refer to:

- STEP Eiken: Japan's national English exam, the Eiken Test in Practical English Proficiency, produced by the Society for Testing English Proficiency (STEP), Inc.
- Sixth Term Examination Paper, an examination set by the University of Cambridge to assess potential undergraduate mathematics applicants.
- The step test was a cardiac fitness test formerly administered by the U.S. Forest Service as a physical fitness test for wildland firefighters. It has been replaced by the Work Capacity Test (WCT), also known as the pack test.
- Harvard step test, a type of cardiac stress test for detecting and/or diagnosing cardiovascular disease and measure fitness.
