= S130 =

S130 may refer to:

- S130 road or Yuandong avenue, a road in Shanghai, China connected to the A1 expressway
- Nissan 280ZX
- S-130: Firefighter Training, a training course in the field of wildland fire suppression in the United States
- German fast attack craft UW10, a former Kriegsmarine S130 commissioned 1957 to 1993, a Schnellboot. See List of German Federal Navy ships
- Renfe Class 130 Serie 130 de RENFE, a high speed train in Spain
