= MSFT =

MSFT may refer to:

- Microsoft, NASDAQ stock symbol
- Multi-stage fitness test, used to estimate maximum oxygen uptake
- Tricolour Flame (Italian: Movimento Sociale Fiamma Tricolore or MS-FT), a neo-fascist Italian political party
