= Nissan Leopard =

Line of upscale cars

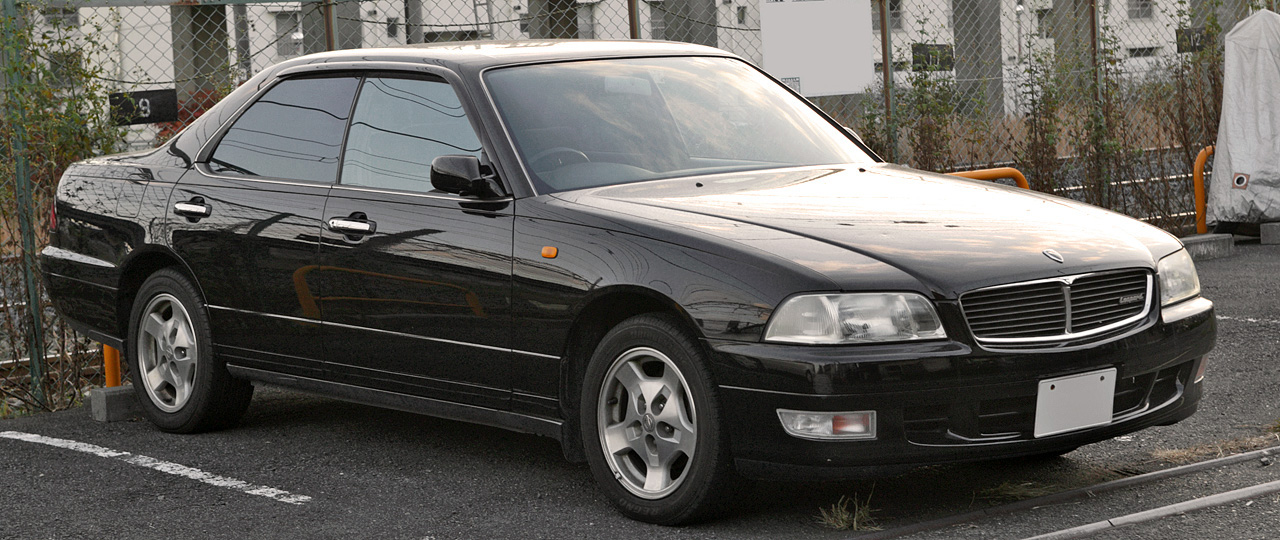
- Nissan Leopard (Y33) in Japan

Overview
- Manufacturer: Nissan
- Production: 1980–2000

Body and chassis
- Class: Executive car Personal luxury car

Chronology
- Successor: Nissan Fuga

The Nissan Leopard is a line of sport/luxury cars built by Japanese carmaker Nissan from 1980 to 2000. The Leopard were initially based on the Japanese market Nissan Skyline and Nissan Laurel, then later based on the chassis of their Nissan Cedric and Nissan Gloria contemporaries and were rear wheel drive. The final versions contributed to Nissan's Infiniti M and J products.

The Leopard coupe and sedan were sold exclusively in Japan at Nissan Satio Store locations, allowing Nissan to sell a badge engineered version of the Skyline and Laurel. The Leopard was cancelled as a result of the Nissan Revival Plan, a casualty of overproduction. It was succeeded by the Nissan Fuga.

== First generation (F30; 1980–1986) ==
Nissan Leopard (F30)
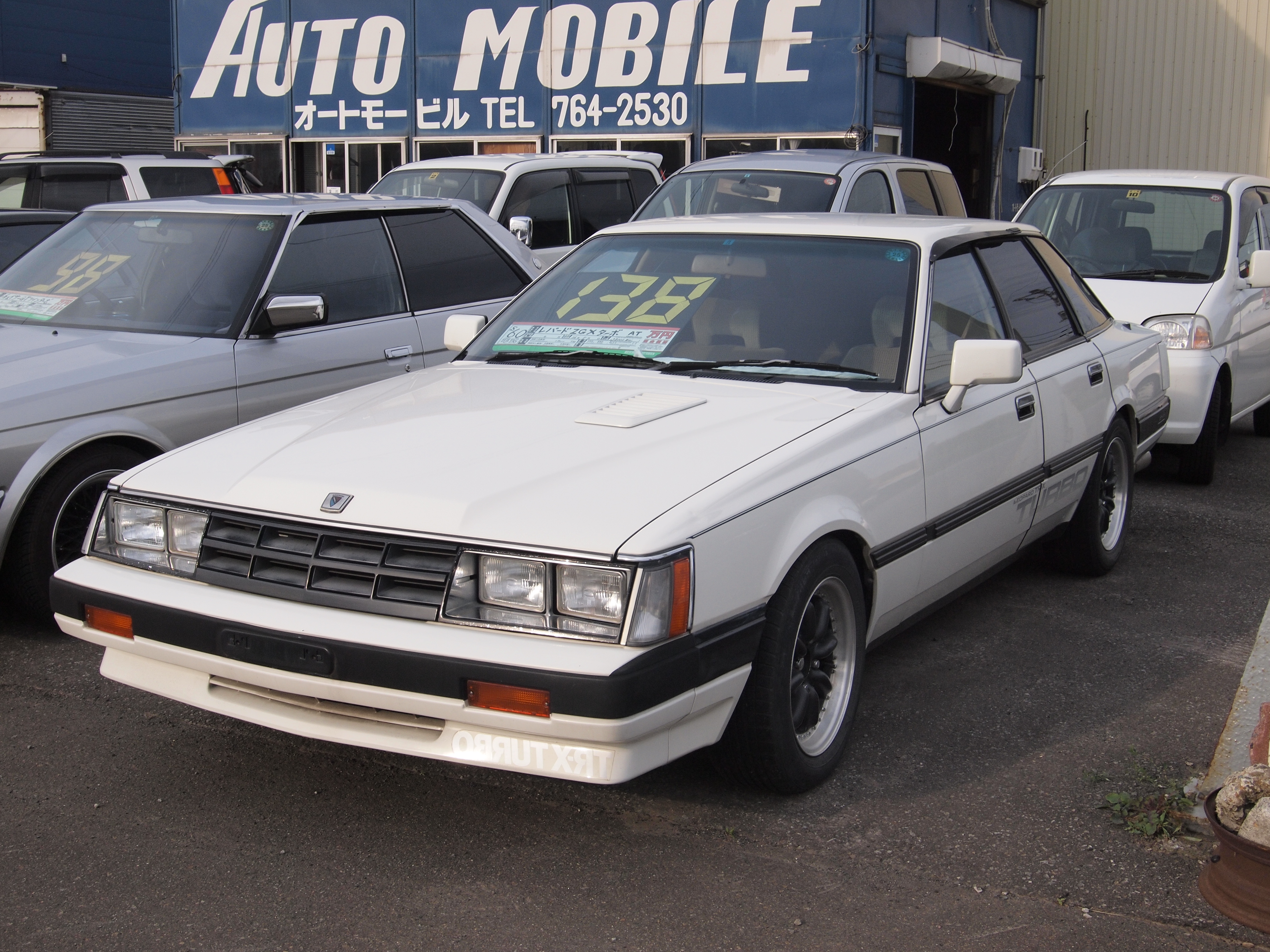
- Nissan Leopard TR-X Turbo ZGX (facelifted version)

Overview
- Production: September 1980 – January 1986
- Assembly: Japan: Musashimurayama
- Designer: Shinichiro Sakurai

Body and chassis
- Body style: 2-door hardtop coupé 4-door hardtop sedan
- Layout: FR layout
- Related: Nissan Skyline R30; Nissan Laurel C31

Powertrain
- Engine: 1.8 L Z18 I4; 2.0 L L20E I6; 2.0 L L20ET turbo I6; 2.8 L L28E I6; 3.0 L VG30ET turbo V6
- Transmission: 4-/5-speed manual 3-speed 3N71 automatic 4-speed E4N71B automatic

Dimensions
- Wheelbase: 2,625 mm (103.3 in)
- Length: 4,630 mm (182.3 in)
- Width: 1,690 mm (66.5 in)
- Height: 1,335–1,355 mm (52.6–53.3 in)
- Curb weight: 1,095–1,315 kg (2,414–2,899 lb)

The first Leopard (also known as Leopard TR-X) was introduced in September 1980 as an all-new contender in the upper medium-class segment. The Leopard was positioned as a larger coupé and sedan above the traditional Nissan Bluebird 810 with the six-cylinder engine. The Leopard coupé was introduced after the Toyota Chaser but before the Toyota Soarer. The angular body was offered as a two-door hardtop coupé in the personal luxury car category and as a four-door hardtop sedan. Both had very slim C- and D-pillars and large glass surfaces. The coupé also featured a "glass-to-glass" rear window. The angular styling was shared with the Fairlady Z, and both body styles were exclusive to Nissan Satio Store. The coupé replaced the Nissan Cedric coupé and Nissan Laurel coupé, while the sedan replaced the Nissan Stanza at Nissan Satio Store. The wind resistance drag coefficient of the two-door version is 0.37. At the time of introduction, the two body styles both carried the same price tags. The Leopard featured some industry firsts, including a fuel consumption gauge on the dashboard.

Originally, the Leopard was available with naturally aspirated inline four- and six-cylinder engines of 1,800, 2,000, and 2,800 cc displacement; the largest engine received an electronic engine management system developed together with Hitachi, and was called NAPS-Z. The 1.8 liter fours were also originally available with a four-speed manual transmission, all others received five-speeds as standard (or an optional three-speed automatic). In July 1981 a two-liter turbocharged engine was added. Available as a GX, SGX, and ZGX, it had the same maximum output 145 PS (143 hp; 107 kW) as did the more expensive and heavier 2.8.

In September 1982, the Leopard received a mild facelift and with it, the under-performing 2.8 was dropped from the lineup. In June 1984 a limited Turbo Grand Edition with the 300ZX's 230 PS (227 hp; 169 kW) 3 litre VG30ET turbo V6 engine joined the line-up.

The car shared many components with the six-cylinder version of the Nissan Bluebird (910), sold in North America as the Datsun 810 (and later renamed the Nissan Maxima), but used a platform based on the Nissan Skyline R30. The Japanese version had side view mirrors mounted on the front fenders and (uniquely) had small wipers attached to the top of the mirrors to remove accumulated rain and dirt from the surface of the mirrors.

A list of the various trim levels and engines that the Leopard was available with at its introduction. The 2-liter engine gave Japanese buyers the option of paying less annual road tax:

model	engine	displ.	output			weight		notes
model	engine	displ.	PS	kW	at (rpm)	kg	lb	notes
180X F	Z18 I4, twin-carb	1,770 cc	105	77	6,000	1,095	2,414	
180X CF	Z18 I4, twin-carb	1,770 cc	105	77	6,000	1,110	2,447	
200X F	L20E I6, Nissan ECCS fuel injection	1,998 cc	125	92	6,000	1,190	2,624	four-door only
200X CF	L20E I6, Nissan ECCS fuel injection	1,998 cc	125	92	6,000	1,200	2,646	
200X SF	L20E I6, Nissan ECCS fuel injection	1,998 cc	125	92	6,000	1,255	2,767	
200X SF-L	L20E I6, Nissan ECCS fuel injection	1,998 cc	125	92	6,000	1,265	2,789	
280X CF	L28E I6, Nissan ECCS fuel injection	2,753 cc	145	107	5,200	1,230	2,712	
280X SF-L	L28E I6, Nissan ECCS fuel injection	2,753 cc	145	107	5,200	1,290	2,844	
four-door bodywork adds 10 kg (22 lb)

After a mild styling update in late 1982, the car was offered in the following variations:
180X GX, SGX
200X SGX, ZGX
200 Turbo SGX, ZGX, ZGX Super Edition
300 Turbo Grand Edition

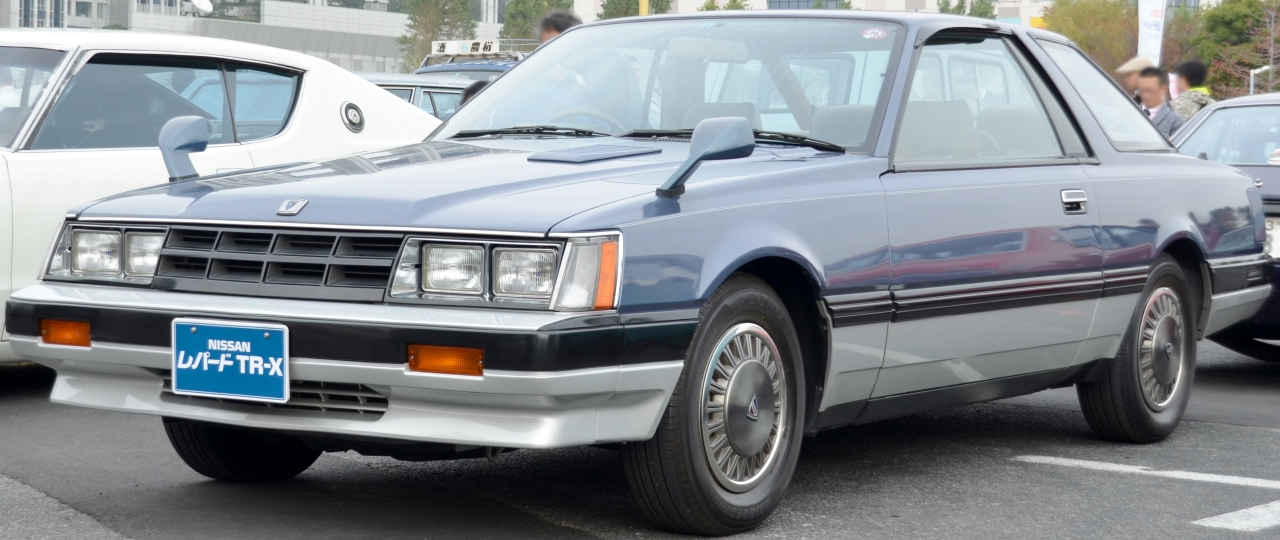
Nissan Leopard TR-X Turbo SGX coupé

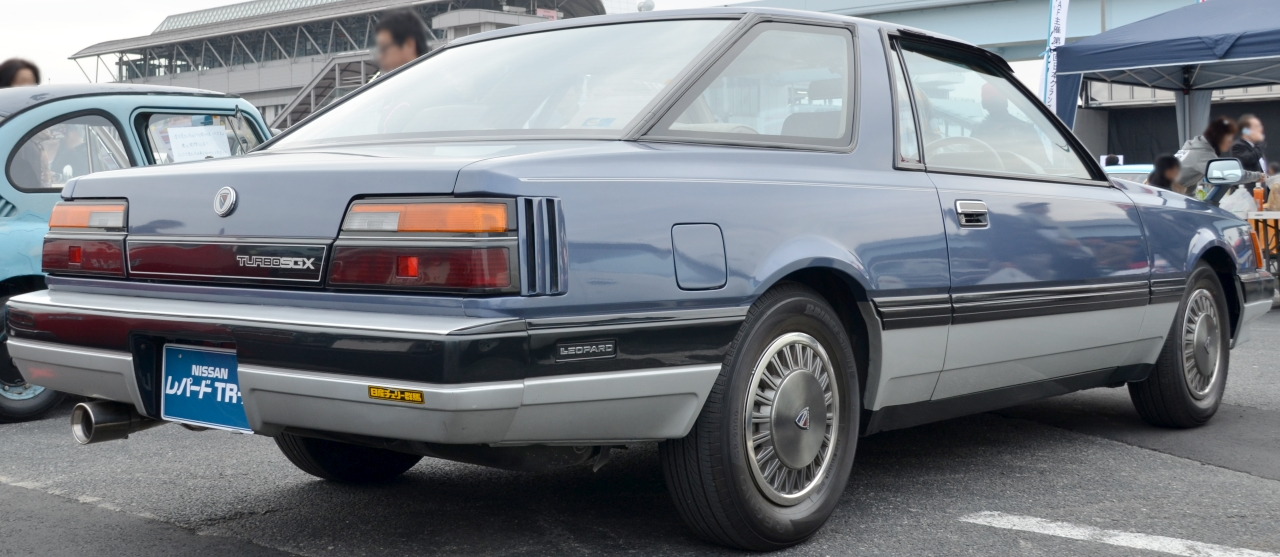
Nissan Leopard TR-X Turbo SGX coupé, rear

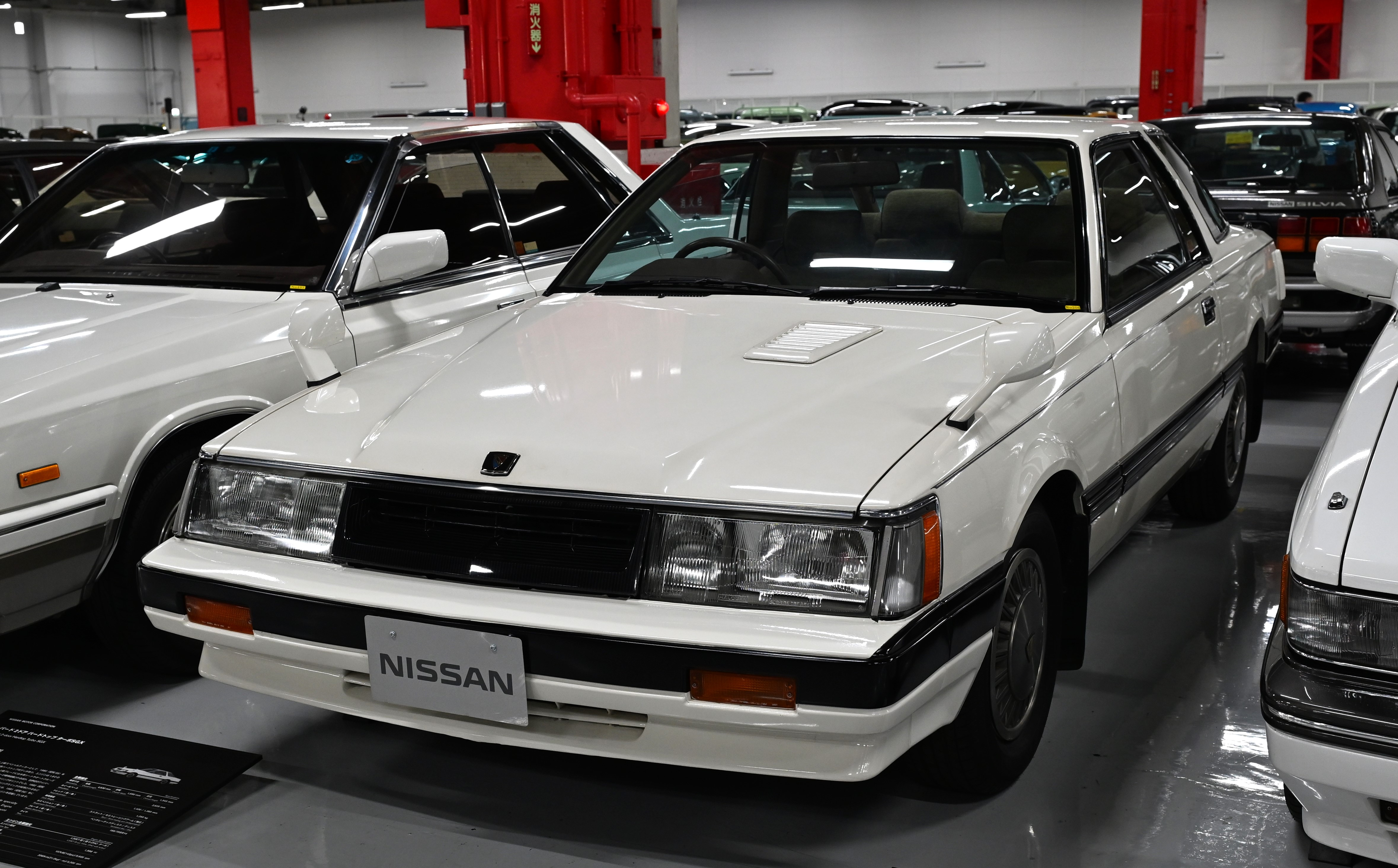
Facelifted Nissan Leopard Turbo SGX coupé

== Second generation (F31; 1986–1992) ==
Most of the information in this article was translated from the Nissan Leopard article on Japanese Wikipedia at ja:日産・レパード.

Nissan Leopard (F31)
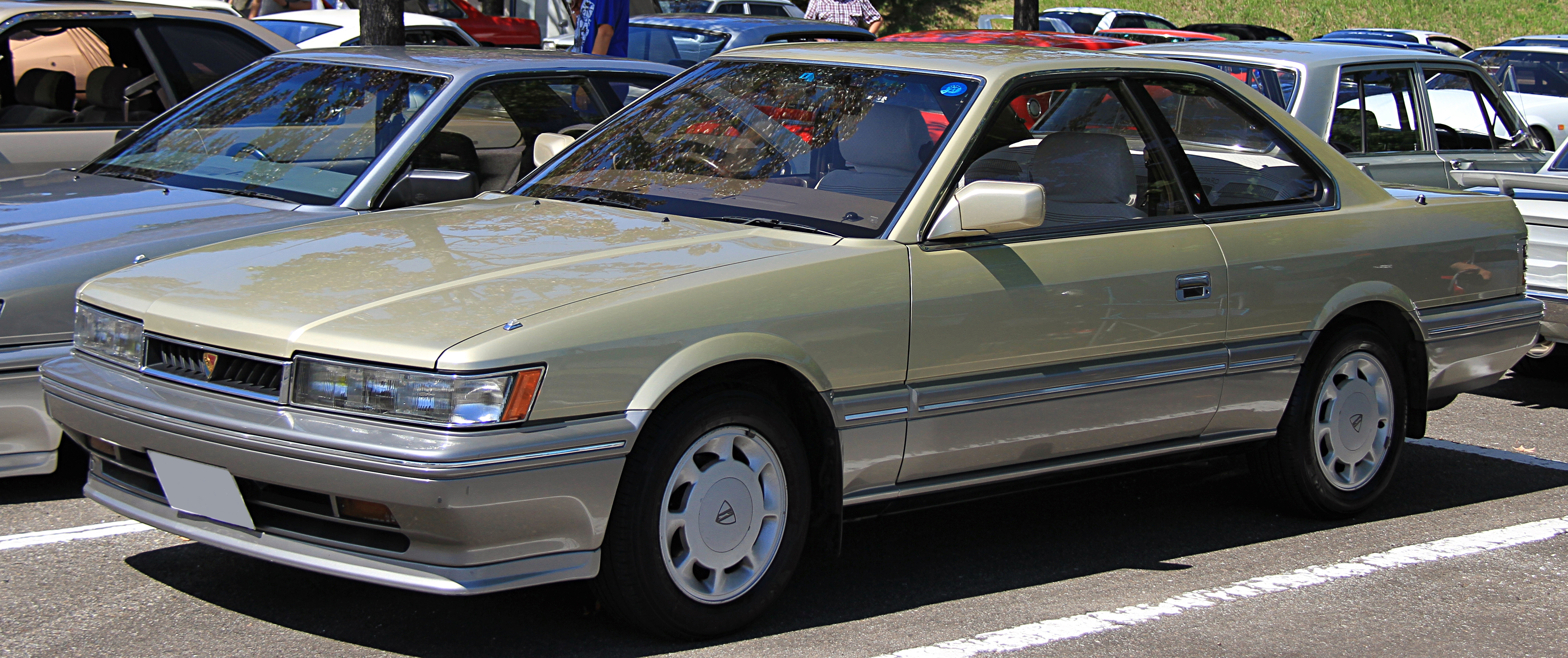
- Nissan Leopard XJ-II

Overview
- Also called: Infiniti M30
- Production: February 1986 – May 1992
- Assembly: Japan: Musashimurayama

Body and chassis
- Body style: 2-door coupé
- Layout: FR layout
- Related: Nissan Skyline R31; Nissan Laurel C32; Nissan Cefiro A31; Autech Zagato Stelvio AZ1

Powertrain
- Engine: 2.0 L VG20E V6; 2.0 L VG20ET turbo V6; 2.0 L VG20DET DOHC turbo V6; 3.0 L VG30DE DOHC V6; 3.0 L VG30DET DOHC turbo V6
- Transmission: 5-speed manual 4-speed RE4R01A automatic

Dimensions
- Wheelbase: 2,615 mm (103.0 in)
- Length: 4,680 mm (184.3 in); 4,805 mm (189.2 in) (1988-1992 with 3.0 L)
- Width: 1,690 mm (66.5 in)
- Height: 1,370 mm (53.9 in)
- Curb weight: 1,310–1,470 kg (2,888–3,241 lb)

The F31 Leopard appeared in February 1986 and was available only as a GT, a luxury version of the Skyline coupé. This vehicle shared a platform with the Nissan Skyline R31, Nissan Cefiro A31, and the Nissan Laurel C32 to share development costs, benefiting from Project 901. The Leopard sedan was replaced by the platform-sharing Cefiro in 1988.

The F31 Leopard was directly competing mainly with the Toyota Soarer, Mazda Cosmo, and the Honda Legend coupé in 1986. Whereas Toyota offered the Soarer several iterations of its straight six in 2.0, 2.8, and 3.0 liters' displacement, Nissan offered the all-new V6 either naturally aspirated or with a turbo in its Leopard. The displacements of the engines were of either 2.0 or 3.0 liters. The engines offered were the VG30DET, VG30DE, VG20DET, VG20ET, and VG20E. Early 2.0 turbo versions had the single-cam (per bank) VG20ET, but from August 1988, the quad-cam version appeared.

The bodywork was also facelifted in August 1988 and now featured a smoother front appearance, achieving a wind resistance coefficient of 0.32. It was the facelifted version that was exported to the USA, and approximately 12,000 Leopards were sold (with around 6,000 of those being converted to convertibles by ASC). In the USA, the F31 was called the Infiniti M30. Output of the VG30DE engine also increased marginally at the time of the facelift. The new turbocharged 3.0 liter VG30DET engine was available in top-spec form, which produces 255 PS (252 hp; 188 kW). Only the smaller VG20ET and VG20DET engines had intercoolers installed.

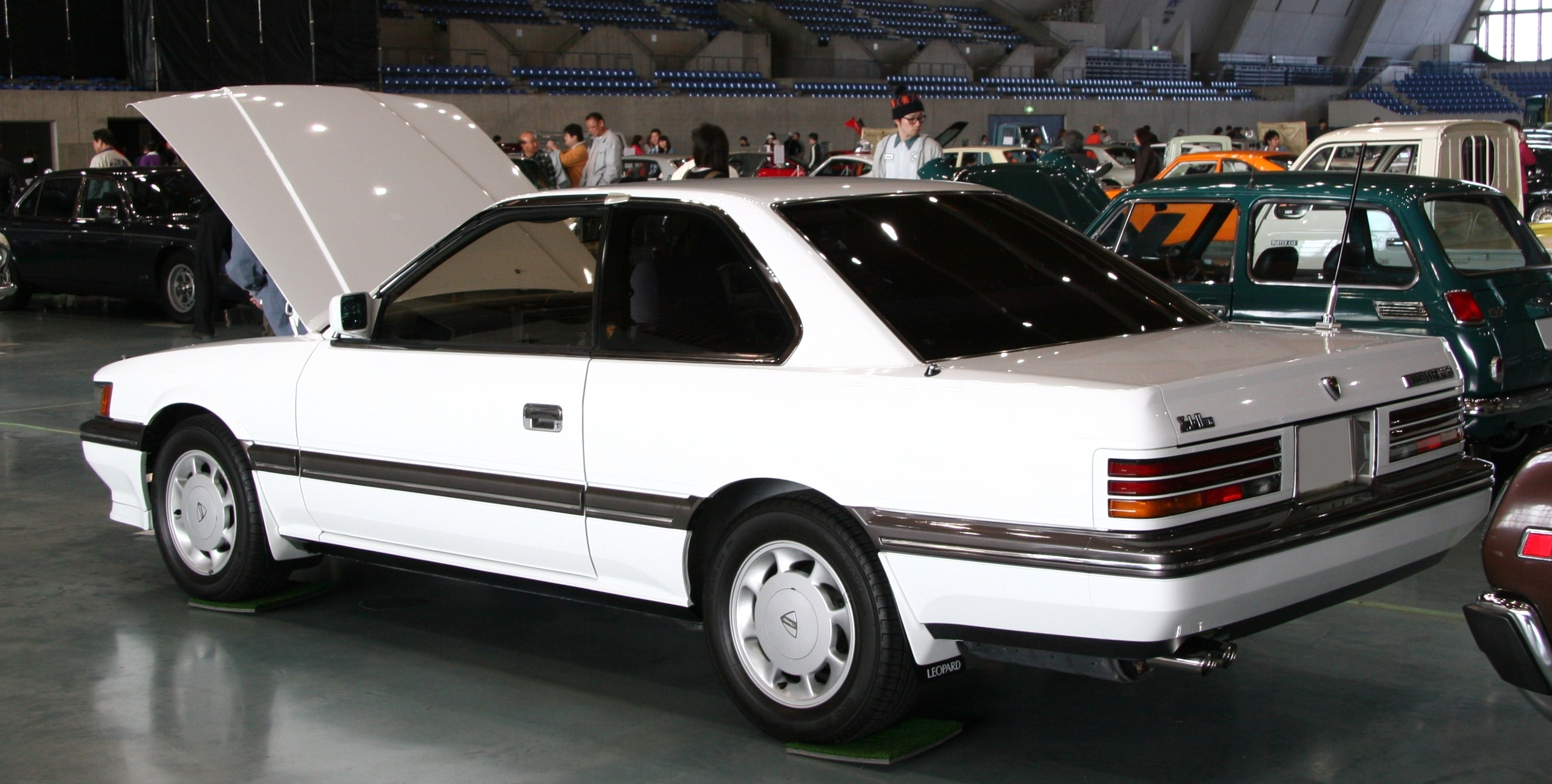
1986-1988 Nissan Leopard XJ-II rear

The Fairlady ZX, echoed the angular bodywork. However, the coupé was sold only at Nissan Satio Store locations in Japan. The Leopard offered a more traditional coupé style as an alternative to the Fairlady ZX's fastback design.

Trim packages started with the top-level Ultima Grand Selection with the 3.0 V6 engine, the Ultima with the 3.0 V6 (later the Ultima received the 3.0 V6 turbo), the XS-II Grand Selection with the 2.0 V6 Turbo, the XS-II with the 2.0 V6 Turbo, the XS with the V6 Turbo, the XJ-II with a 2.0 V6 and the base model called the XJ with the 2.0 V6. All models came with a digital instrument cluster, all models except the XS and the XJ came with stereo and cruise control buttons installed in the steering wheel center pad, and both Grand Selection models were installed with a 6-inch CRT TV screen installed in the dashboard below the A/C controls that allowed passengers to watch broadcast TV if the transmission was in Park and the parking brake applied. The screen was not touch-sensitive and didn't offer a CD-ROM-based navigation system. The display also showed AM/FM stereo settings. The video entertainment system also had RCA connections to attach a camcorder and watch recorded video. Sony supplied the stereo and video equipment. On top of that, the Ultima models featured a keyless entry card.

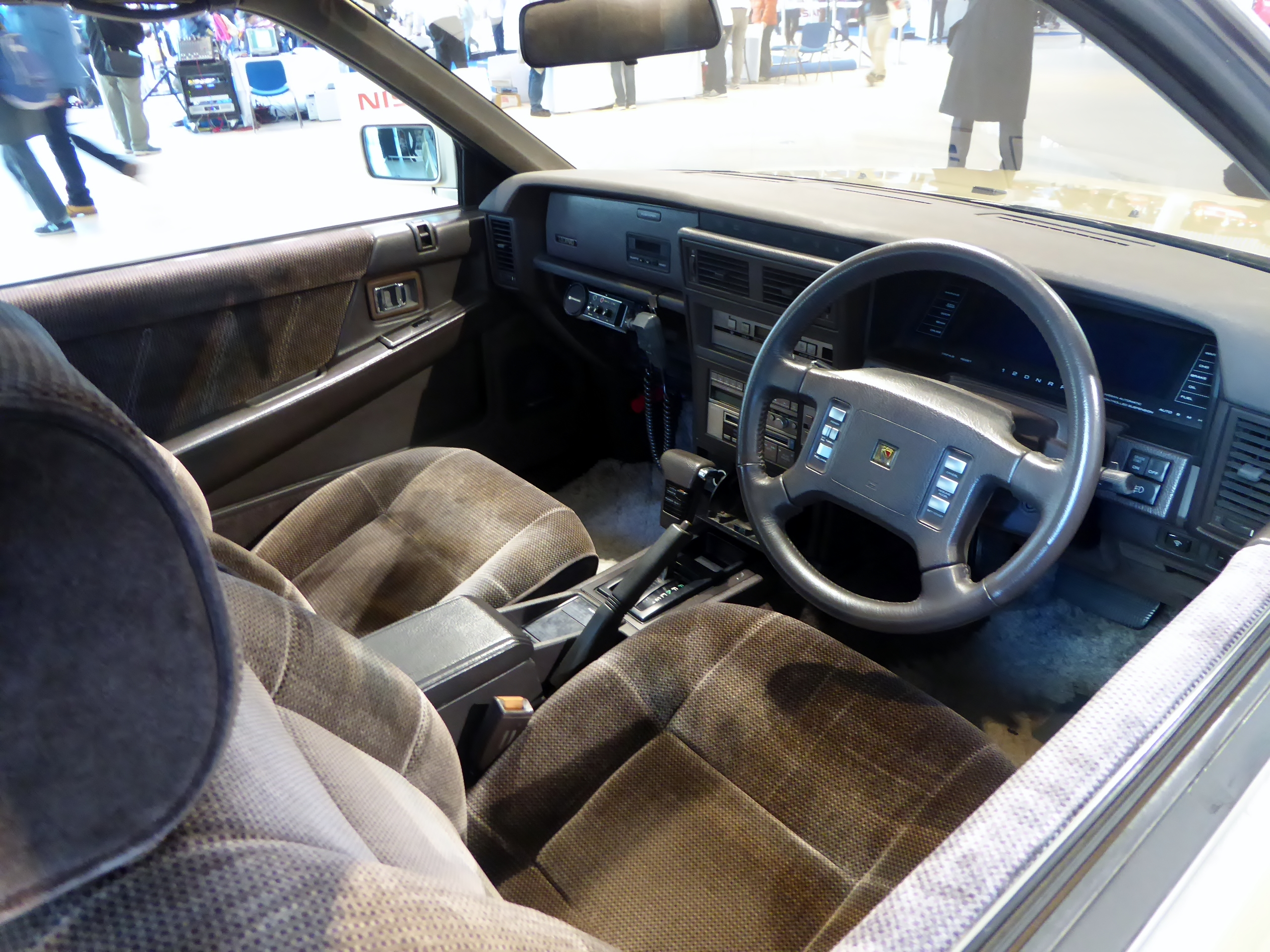
1987 Nissan Leopard 3.0 Ultima interior

The Leopard F31 had few factory options, but dealers offered the addition of a cellular phone installed in a dedicated compartment in the dashboard above the glove compartment, where a modern passenger-side airbag would now be located. They also offered a choice of a cassette tape changer installed in the center armrest compartment, with a separate single-disc CD player in the dashboard. A CD changer was later upgraded to the center armrest compartment.

Catering to Japanese tastes for luxury, the Leopard wasn't available in leather for all trim packages, with a wool interior offered on the top three trim packages. The front passenger seat was also equipped with what Nissan called the "Partner Comfort Seat," where the top portion of the front passenger seat was further articulated to tilt forward, supporting the passenger's shoulders while allowing the seatback structure to recline. The front edge of the passenger seat cushion was also adjustable. This was created by Dr. Yoshiyuki Matsuoka, who worked for Nissan from 1982.

Like the Skyline and Fairlady ZX, the Leopard coupé was a front-engined and rear-wheel drive vehicle. The RE4R01A four-speed automatic with electronic overdrive was used, as well as a five-speed manual transmission, which was only available in the domestic Japanese market on the lower trim level XJ-II and the XJ 2.0 V6 without a turbo. The differential was a Nissan R200-type open differential.

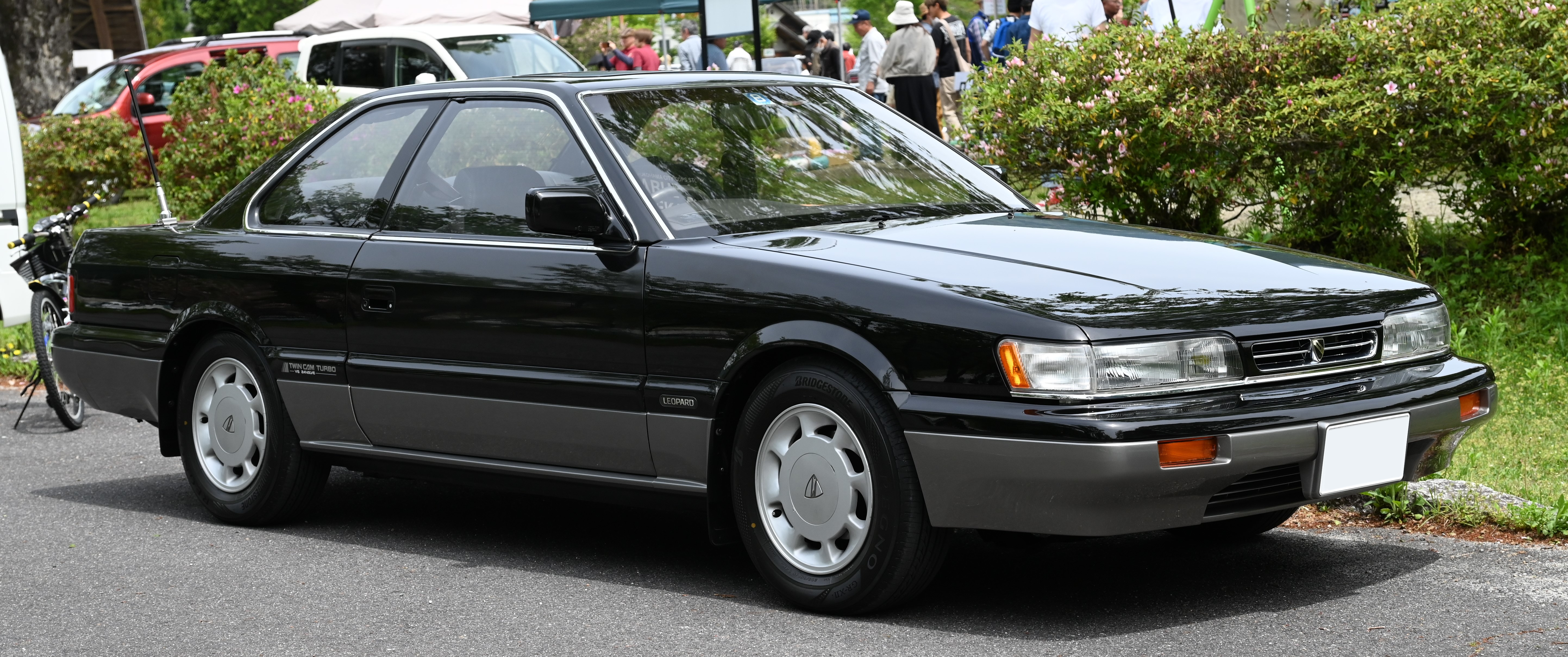
Facelift model Nissan Leopard Ultima Turbo in Japan

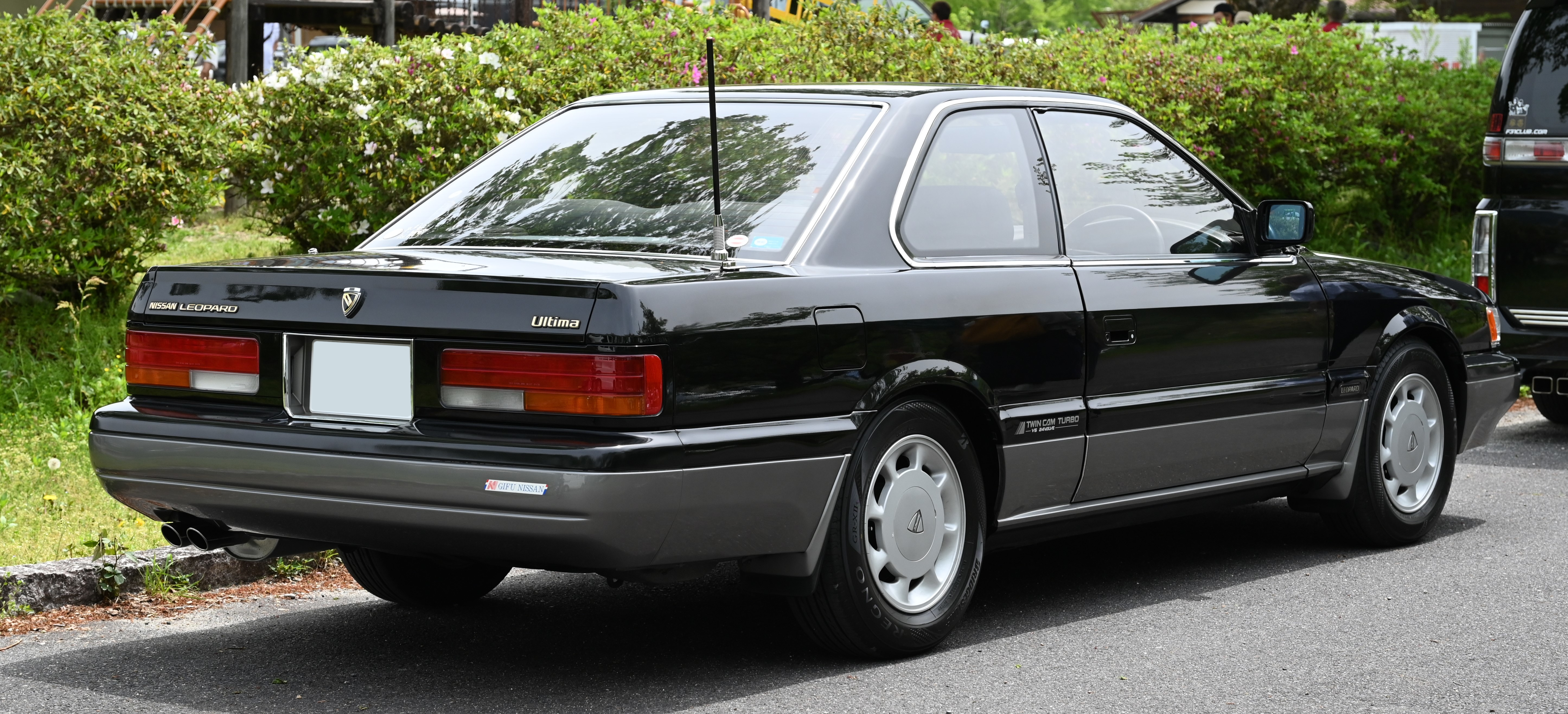
Rear view of the facelift model Nissan Leopard Ultima Turbo

The suspension was shared with the Skyline and Laurel, using MacPherson struts for the front wheels and a semi-trailing arm rear suspension with coil springs for the rear. If the Leopard was optionally equipped with the "Super Sonic Suspension" system, a sonar module mounted under the front bumper scanned the road surface and adjusted the suspension accordingly via actuators mounted on all four coil over shock absorbers. There was also a switch on the center console that allowed the driver to change between "Auto," "Soft," "Medium," and "Hard" settings on all models except the XS model, which removed the "Auto" selection. The speed-sensitive rack-and-pinion power steering could also be separately reduced for a sporting feeling, and the suspension setting would modify both the steering feel and the shift points on the automatic transmission. A multi-link suspension was installed on the front wheels to accommodate the adjustable ride height shock absorbers.

The Leopard F31's production run lasted seven years, ending in June 1992 due to lagging sales. Seven years was very long by period Japanese standards, nearly equaling the runs of two generations of most Japanese cars. Nobody knows exactly how many Infiniti M30 were produced for the US market, but it has been said that just over 17,000 were made. It is unknown how many were coupés and how many were convertibles; the convertible was only available in 1991 and 1992. 38,000 F31 Leopards were sold in Japan during its seven-year production span.

Second generation engines
type	layout	displ.	output			dates
type	layout	displ.	PS	kW	at (rpm)	dates
VG20E	V6, EFi	1,998 cc	115	85	6,000	1986.02–1992.05
VG20ET	V6 turbo EFi	1,998 cc	155	114	5,600	1986.0 / 2–1988.08
VG20DET	DOHC V6 turbo EFi	1,998 cc	210	154	6,800	1988.0 / 8–1992.05
VG30DE	DOHC V6 EFi	2,960 cc	185	136	6,000	1986.0 / 2–1988.08
VG30DE	DOHC V6 EFi	2,960 cc	200	147	6,000	1988.0 / 8–1992.05
VG30DET	DOHC V6 turbo EFi	2,960 cc	255	188	6,000	1988.0 / 8–1992.05

== Third generation (Y32; 1992–1996) ==
Nissan Leopard J Ferie (Y32)
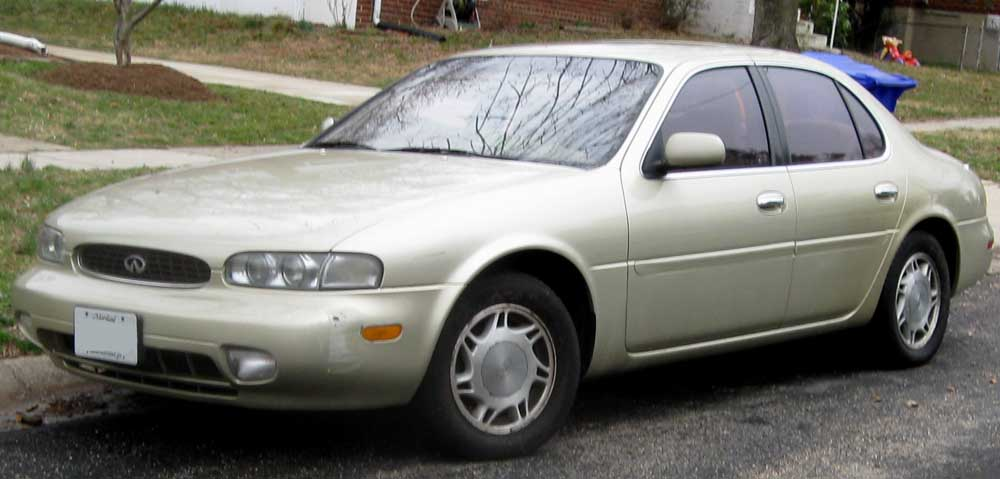

Overview
- Also called: Infiniti J30
- Production: June 1992 – February 1996
- Assembly: Japan: Kaminokawa, Tochigi

Body and chassis
- Class: executive car
- Body style: 4-door sedan
- Layout: FR layout
- Related: Nissan Cima Y32; Nissan Cedric Y32; Nissan Gloria Y32

Powertrain
- Engine: 3.0 L VG30DE V6; 4.1 L VH41DE V8
- Transmission: 4-speed RE4R01A automatic

Dimensions
- Wheelbase: 2,760 mm (108.7 in)
- Length: 4,880 mm (192.1 in)
- Width: 1,770 mm (69.7 in)
- Height: 1,390 mm (54.7 in)
- Curb weight: 1,650 kg (3,640 lb)

The third generation (internally the Y32 Leopard) was designed by Jerry Hirshberg, president of Nissan Design International (NDI) and marketed as the Leopard J Ferie, beginning in June 1992 — as a four-door, five-passenger rear-drive sedan. Production began on April 7, 1992 as a 1993 model, and production ended on June 18, 1997. This was the second and last generation of Leopard to be sold in North America, where it was sold as the Infiniti J30.

The Leopard abandoned the coupé and changed platforms from the Skyline and Laurel to the longer Cedric and Gloria. The sedan was the only body style offered, and was exclusive to Nissan Satio Store. Its appearance at introduction was distinctive, and its small interior resulted from its rounded styling, uncharacteristic of the crowded executive car class at the time; it is now considered an early variant of a four-door coupé.

All J30s/Leopard J Feries were manufactured in Tochigi, Tochigi, Japan. The series used a MacPherson strut front suspension, a multi-link suspension rear suspension, and Nissan's upgraded proprietary four-wheel steering technology, Super HICAS.

The nameplate J Férié derives from the French jour férié, for holiday. The word Ferie was (almost) shared with the Honda Civic Ferio marketed at the same time.

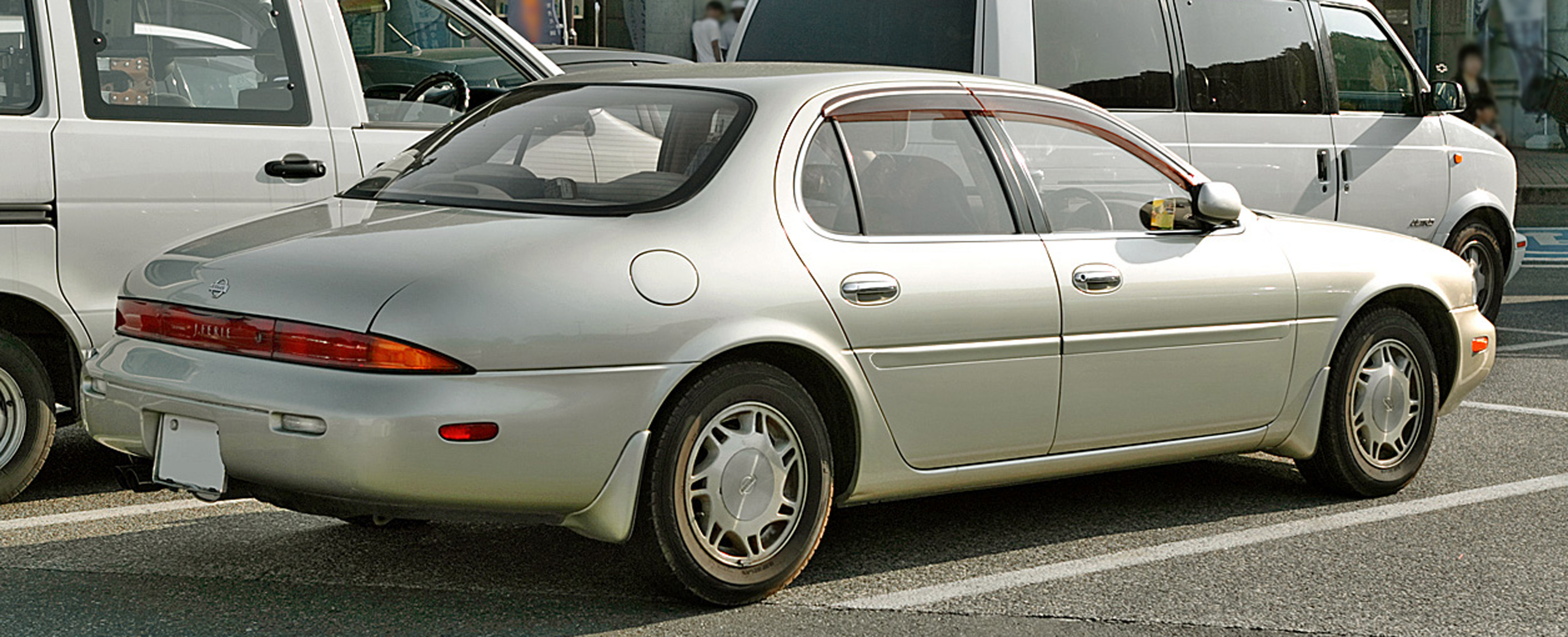
Nissan Leopard J Ferie in Japan

Power came from a 3.0 L VG30DE V6 (shared with the 300ZX) which produced 210 PS (154 kW) and 192 lb⋅ft (260 N⋅m) of torque. While it shares the Y32 Chassis with the Nissan Cedric/Gloria, it was offered the engines used in the Nissan Cima Y32 where it was offered with both the VG30DE and VH41DE V8.

In Japan, three trim levels were offered, the Type X with VH41DE V8, the Type L which had the same equipment level as the Type X with the smaller VG30DE V6 engine, and the Type F offered with the V6 but more modestly equipped. Later updates offered the Type X-S V6 sharing the equivalent content level with the North American V6 equipped J30, and the Type L-S V6 sharing the equipment package with the Type X-S. The V8 claimed 270 PS (199 kW) in Japanese specifications. This generation was the first time an engine with a displacement under 2.0 L wasn't offered in Japan, and resulted in Japanese buyers being liable for a higher annual road tax bill which affected sales.

The previous generation 6-inch CRT TV screen was upgraded to a color LCD screen, that was installed in the dashboard below the A/C controls that allowed passengers to watch broadcast TV if the transmission was in Park and the parking brake applied. As before, the screen was not touch sensitive, and didn't offer a CD-ROM based navigation system. The display also showed AM/FM stereo settings. The video entertainment system also had RCA connections to attach a camcorder and watch recorded video. The stereo and video equipment was supplied by Sony.

The leather interior was designed with assistance from Poltrona Frau of Italy. The seats were made by Poltrona Frau at a rate of five per day. The interior treatment continued to use the contrasting arrangement used in the larger Nissan Infiniti Q45 with a dark color used for the dashboard, and center console, with a lighter shade color used inside for the seats, interior door panels, headliner, carpet, and carpeted floor mats. The drivers window switch was both one-touch express down and double-sized, i.e., the same width as two conventional window switches, with the front and rear passenger window switches further down and the window lockout switch installed next to the front passenger switch. The front passenger and rear passenger window switches were thumb activated, installed at the top of the interior door pull handle. The Y32 was the first car sold in Japan to include a passenger-side airbag as standard equipment.

One of the numerous reasons the Y32 Leopard did not meet projected sales goals was that its most distinguishing feature was a lack of interior room. It had the distinction of being a mid-size car with the space of a subcompact (less than a Sunny) due to its sloping roofline and rounded down trunk. The styling of the vehicle was more favorably regarded in Japan than it was in the USA.

All were built in Tochigi, Tochigi, Japan. Over its lifetime, approximately 70,000 were sold in the United States (more than 20,000 per year for 1993 and 1994; 17,899 in 1995; 7,564 in 1996; and 4,594 in 1997) and less than 8,000 were sold in Japan.

Information for this section of the article was translated from Leopard J Ferie.com

== Fourth generation (Y33; 1996–2000) ==
Most of the information in this article was translated from the Nissan Leopard article on Japanese Wikipedia at ja:日産・レパード.

Nissan Leopard (Y33)
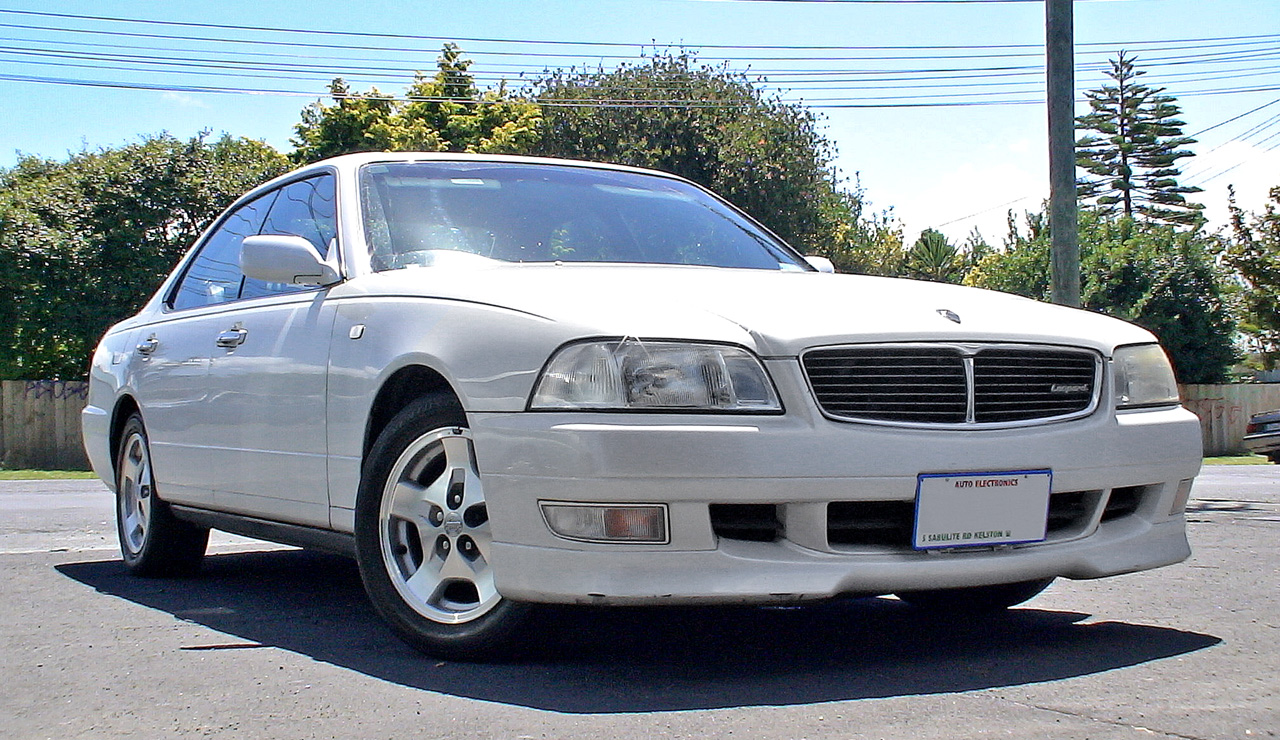

Overview
- Production: March 1996 – December 2000
- Assembly: Japan: Kaminokawa, Tochigi

Body and chassis
- Body style: 4-door sedan
- Layout: FR layout / AWD
- Related: Y33 Nissan Cima; Y33 Nissan Cedric Gran Turismo; Y33 Nissan Gloria Gran Turismo; Y33 Infiniti Q45

Powertrain
- Engine: 2.0 L VG20E SOHC V6; 2.5 L RB25DET turbo DOHC I6; 2.5 L VQ25DE DOHC V6; 3.0 L VG30E SOHC V6; 3.0 L VQ30DE DOHC V6; 3.0 L VQ30DD DI DOHC V6; 3.0 L VQ30DET turbo DOHC V6
- Transmission: 4-speed RE4R01A automatic

Dimensions
- Wheelbase: 2,800 mm (110.2 in)
- Length: 4,895 mm (192.7 in)
- Width: 1,765 mm (69.5 in)
- Height: 1,425 mm (56.1 in)
- Curb weight: 1,610 kg (3,550 lb)

The fourth and last generation of the Leopard, introduced in March 1996, was offered as a hardtop sedan again, using frameless side windows with a "B" pillar. The controversial "J Ferie" appearance and the model name were canceled, and the Leopard shared its chassis, suspension, powertrain, and interior with the Cedric Gran Turismo and Gloria Gran Turismo to save on manufacturing and production costs. There were four available trim packages, starting with the XV-G, equipped with rear seat passenger comfort and convenience features, followed by XV, XR, and XJ. Because this version was essentially a reskinned Cedric and Gloria, the all-new telematics in-car navigation system called Compass Link was installed as an extra cost option in all trim packages beginning with this generation using a 7-inch color LCD screen while continuing the multi-AV functionality of previous generations.

A V8 engine was deleted, and at the time of introduction, only three V6 engines were available. The XV-G and XV came with the VQ30DET turbo, the XR with the VQ30DE, and the XJ with the VG30E. In January 1997, the XJ-Limited, based on the XJ, was offered the VG20E engine. Super HICAS was also installed on the XV-G and XV, with internal model code JHBY33.

For the 1998 mid-model refresh, the XJ-4 was installed with ATTESA E-TS AWD and the RB25DET turbocharged straight-six engine, borrowed from the Skyline and Laurel. The straight six was installed because ATTESA-ETS was either mated to the VH41DE V8 from the Cima, or the RB25DET from the Skyline and Laurel, which would've made the Leopard too expensive. The VG-based V6 engines were replaced with the VQ series that utilized Nissan's direct fuel injection engine configuration, which supplied fuel directly inside the engine cylinder instead of inside the intake manifold just before entering the cylinders.

As the economic downturn of the post-"Japanese bubble economy" began to take effect, the Leopard's sales declined, continuing at Nissan Saito Store locations. As it directly competed with other Nissan large sedans and performance cars, it was discontinued in December 2000.

It wasn't available in North America, where the Infiniti J30 mid-range had been replaced by the Nissan Cefiro/Infiniti I30.

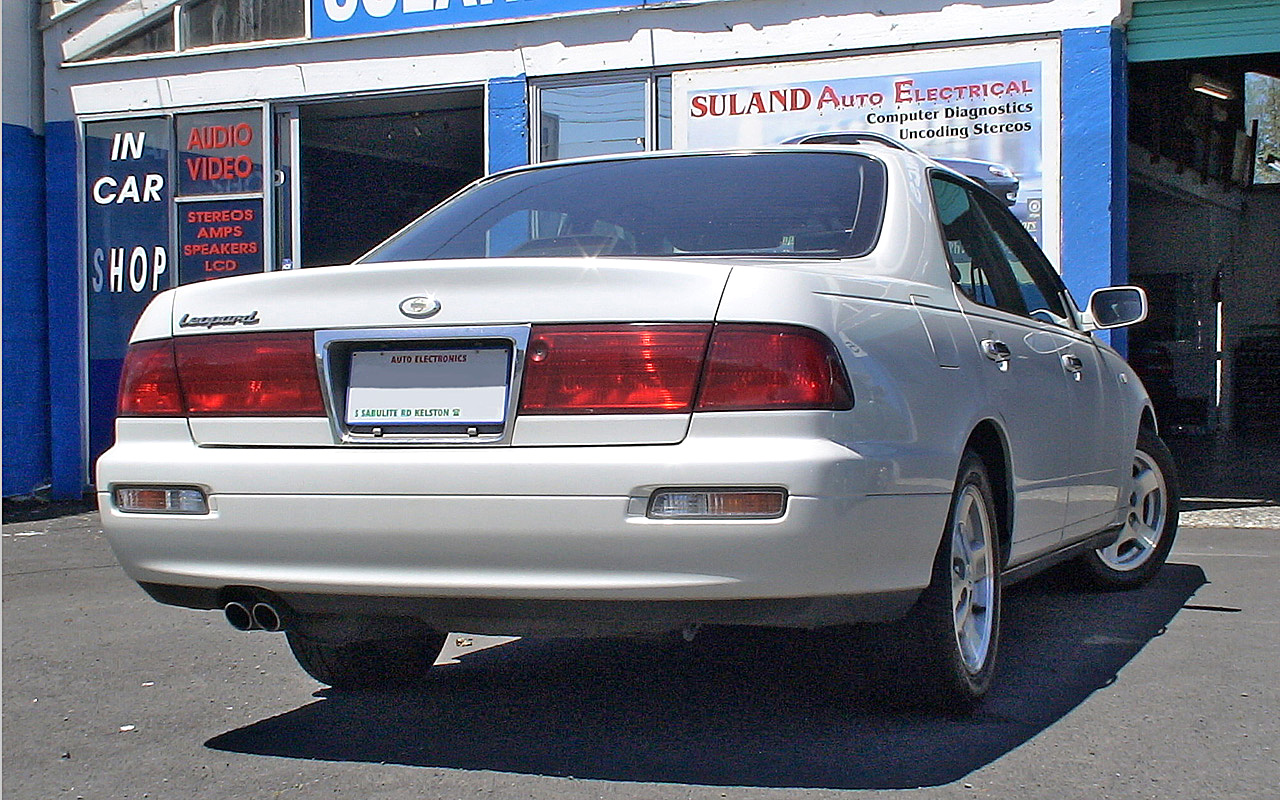
A 1996 Nissan Leopard

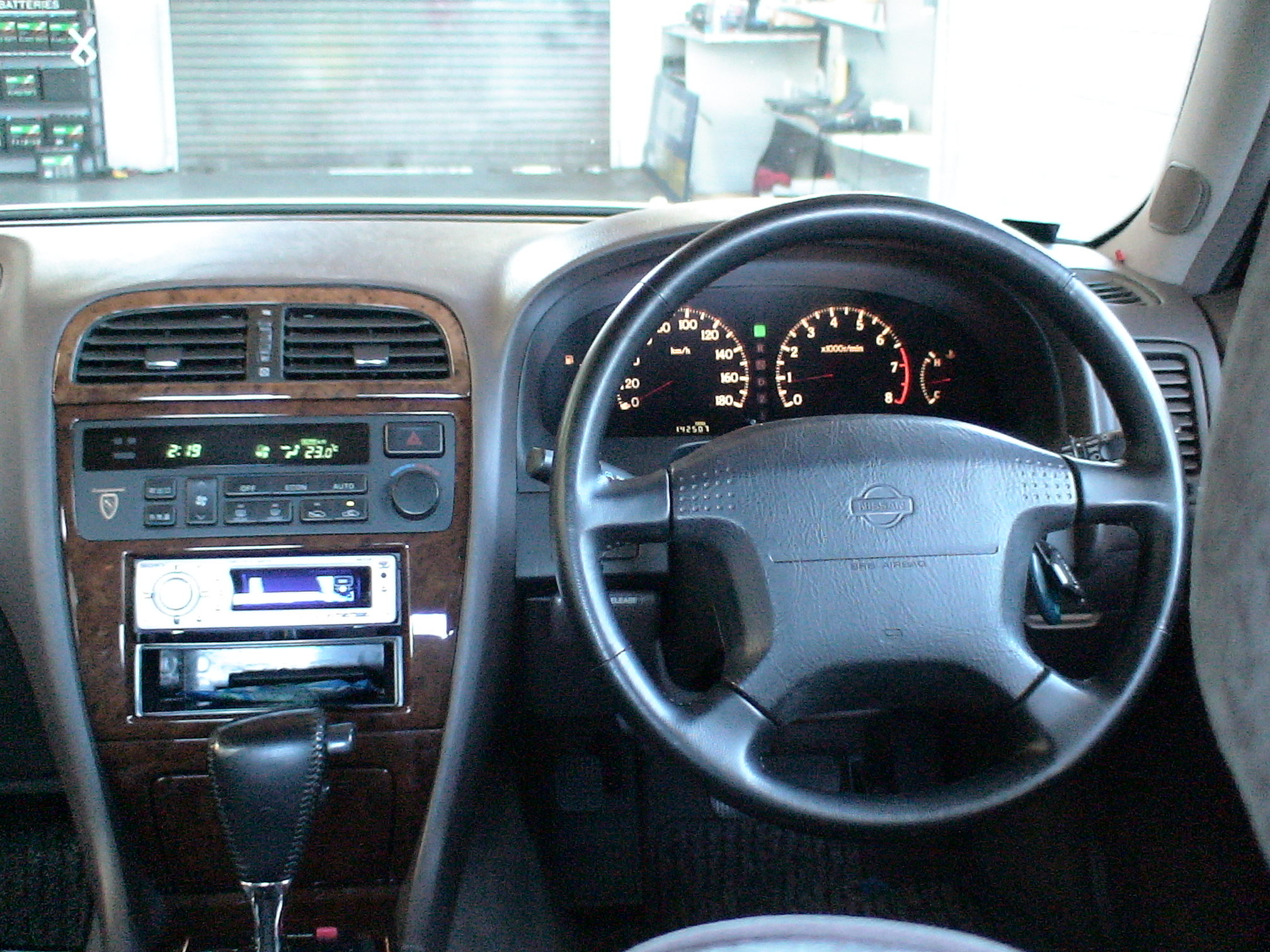
A view of the interior
