= Yo-Yo intermittent test =

Fitness performance estimate

The Yo-Yo intermittent test is aimed at estimating performance in stop-and-go sports like football (soccer), cricket, basketball and the like. It was conceived around the early 1990s by Jens Bangsbo, a Danish soccer physiologist, then described in a 2008 paper, "The Yo-Yo Intermittent Recovery Test". Like many other tests of fitness, it involves running at ever-increasing speeds, to exhaustion. However, a crucial difference is that the Yo-Yo Intermittent test has periodic rest intervals, thus simulating the nature of exertion in stop-and-go sports.

== The four tests ==
There are four versions of the Yo-Yo Intermittent test:

- Recovery Level 1 (Yo-Yo IR1). This is the most popular version focusing "on the capacity to carry out intermittent exercise leading to a maximal activation of the aerobic system".
- Recovery Level 2 (Yo-Yo IR2). This is a tougher version of "Recovery Level 1". It "determines an individual's ability to recover from repeated exercise with a high contribution from the anaerobic system."
- Endurance Level 1 (Yo-Yo IE1). This may be used to test participants in less vigorous sports that usually last longer.
- Endurance Level 2 (Yo-Yo IE2). This is a tougher version of "Endurance Level 1".

The tests, described below, are largely similar to each other in principle. Coaches and individuals are free to select the one that best suits their sport and the individuals they are training.

== Basic features ==
=== Set-up ===
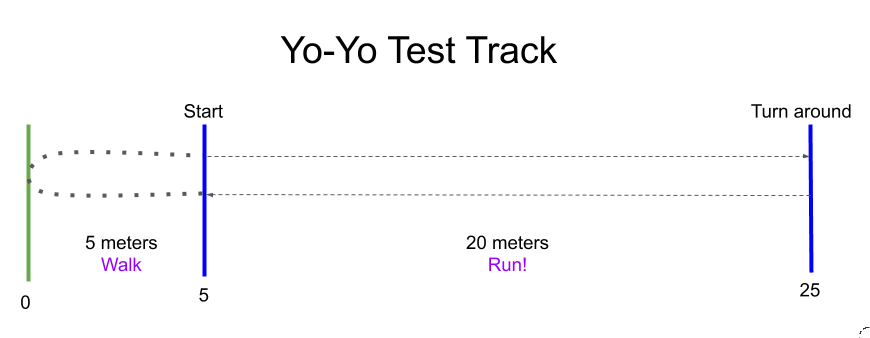

All tests use the same 25-meter track (shown). Markers are placed at 0, 5 and 25 meters on a flat surface that has suitable traction to allow for significant acceleration and deceleration.

=== Procedure ===
The set-up for all four versions is identical. Prior to the test commencing, runners line up at the 5 m marker, facing the 25 m marker. Following a countdown, a double beep signals the start.

1. Runners commence running towards the 25 m marker
2. At or before the following beep, runners must reach the 25 m marker. Touching with a single foot is acceptable
3. At or after, but not before, the same beep, runners commence running back to the 5 m marker
4. At or before the next beep, runners must reach back to the 5 m marker
5. The rest period now commences: 10 seconds in the Recovery tests, 5 seconds in the Endurance tests. Runners stroll to the 0 m marker, then return to the 5 m marker
6. A beep indicates the end of the rest period and the start of the next circuit (back to Step 1)

After a predetermined number of circuits at a speed level (which varies with each version of the test), the speed level changes. This is signaled, usually, by a double beep or, possibly, a voice cue. The required speed at the new speed level will be faster.

==== Scoring ====
A runner who fails to reach the relevant marker in time is cautioned; if they want to continue, they must touch the marker before turning back. Two consecutive failures terminates their attempt. Their most recent successful circuit is marked as their score.

Scoring is usually done using "Speed Level.Circuits" terminology; for example, 15.2, which means "completed 2 circuits at level 15". Alternatively, scores may be recorded as distance; for example, 840 m. The two methods correlate exactly, meaning that given one, it is possible to determine the other (see the tables below).

Note that scores in one version of the test do not correlate with scores in other versions. That is, a score of 15.2 in Yo-Yo IR1 is not the same as 15.2 in Yo-Yo IR2.

== Yo-Yo tests and VO_{2} max ==
VO_{2} max, or milliliters of oxygen per kilogram of body mass per minute (e.g., mL/(kg·min)), is considered an excellent proxy for aerobic fitness. Consequently, attempts have been made to correlate Yo-Yo test scores with VO_{2} max. There are conflicting reports about such a correlation. Two studies reported only a weak correlation. Another study reported strong correlation (R^{2}=0.89) but the author acknowledged that most previous studies showed weak correlation.

=== Formula ===
There are sources that have published formulae for the relationship:

Yo-Yo IR1: VO2max = (Final distance (in meters) × 0.0084) + 36.4

Yo-Yo IR2: VO2max = (Final distance (in meters) × 0.0136) + 45.3

However, an eyeball review indicates minimum scores for Yo-Yo IR1 and Yo-Yo IR2 of 36.4 and 45.3 respectively—that is, the score if the runner does not complete a single circuit. Both scores are reasonably respectable VO_{2} max scores; clearly, the formulae apply with additional caveats (which are not mentioned).

== Yo-Yo IR1 standards ==
A selection of standards, across sports, from around the world. Note that these may be affected by selection bias. An open-access publication on reference values for different sports and activity levels for individuals > 16 years of age has been published in 2018. A reference list for children is also available

=== Women ===
Country	Sport	Organization	Level	Distance (m)
Canada	Field Hockey	FHBC (British Columbia)	15.8	1080
(United Nations) International	Basketball – Referees – Elite	FIBA	15.4	920

=== Men ===
Country	Sport	Organization	Level	Distance (m)
Canada	Field Hockey	FHBC (British Columbia)	18.0	2040
Canada	Rugby Union(Scrum Half, Centre, Stand Off, Back Three)	Canadian Rugby	19.1	2080
(United Nations) International	Basketball; Elite Referees	FIBA	16.3	1200
India	Cricket	National Team	17.1	1440
New Zealand	Cricket	National Team	20.1	2400
Pakistan	Cricket	National Team	17.4	1580
United Kingdom	Rugby League; Elite Referees	Rugby Football League	18.5	2240
United Kingdom	Rugby League; National Referees	Rugby Football League	15.1-17.1	2040
United States	Rugby Union; Elite Referees	USA Rugby	18.5	2240
United States	Rugby Union; National Referees	USA Rugby	18.0	2040
(Cricket West Indies) West Indies	Cricket	National Team	19.0	2080

== See also ==
- Multi-stage fitness test
- Harvard step test, a cardiovascular test
