= S190 =

S190 may refer to:

- German submarine U-11 (S190), a 1968 Bundesmarine Type 205 submarine

S-190 may refer to:

- S-190: Introduction to Wildland Fire Behavior, a training course on the field of wildland fire suppression in the United States
