= WCT =

WCT may refer to:

== Sports ==
- West Coast Trojans, a British American Football team from Scotland
- World Championship Tennis, a tour for professional male players from 1967–1989
- World Championship Tour surfing, a professional competitive surfing league administered by the Association of Surfing Professionals
- World Chase Tag, a type of professional tag played in an obstacle course arena
- World Curling Tour, an international tour for Curling

== Other uses ==
- Wall-clock time, or elapsed real time, the actual time taken from the start of a computer program to the end
- Washington County Transit, a transit system in Washington County, Maryland
- WIPO Copyright Treaty, an international treaty on copyright law
- West Coast Trail, a backpacking trail on Vancouver Island
- Wilson's central terminal, a virtual electrode used in electrocardiography
- Wonderful Christmas Time, a 1979 song by Paul McCartney
- Work Capacity Test, a U.S. Forest Service physical test for wildland firefighters, also known as the "pack test"
- World Confederation of Teachers, a former global union federation
