= Tecumseh step test =

- Purpose: test cardiovascular fitness

The Tecumseh step test is an exercise test that researchers use to determine a person's cardiovascular fitness level.

The Tecumseh step test is a modified version of the Harvard Step Test, and was developed by Professor Henry J. Montoye at the Department of Epidemiology, School of Public Health, University of Michigan. The main differences from the original Harvard protocol were the lower step height (8 inches instead of 20 inches), the more moderate stepping rate (24 steps/minute instead of 30 steps/minute) and the shorter duration (3 minutes instead of 5 minutes). These alterations made this test easier to perform in people across a wide range of ages and physical capacities, and therefore was more suitable for epidemiological studies. The rate of energy expenditure during the test corresponds to approximately five time the basal metabolic rate. The number of heart beats from 30 seconds to 1 minute after the end of the 3-minute step test is used to assess cardiovascular fitness level. The results of the test can also be used to estimate maximum oxygen consumption during exercise (VO2 max).

The Tecumseh step test was originally employed in the Tecumseh Community Health Study run between the 1950s and 60s. During this study, 2696 men and 2568 women aged between 10 and 69 years old performed the Tecumseh step test. It has also been used in more recent studies.
