= Nissan Fairlady Z (S130) =

Nissan S130
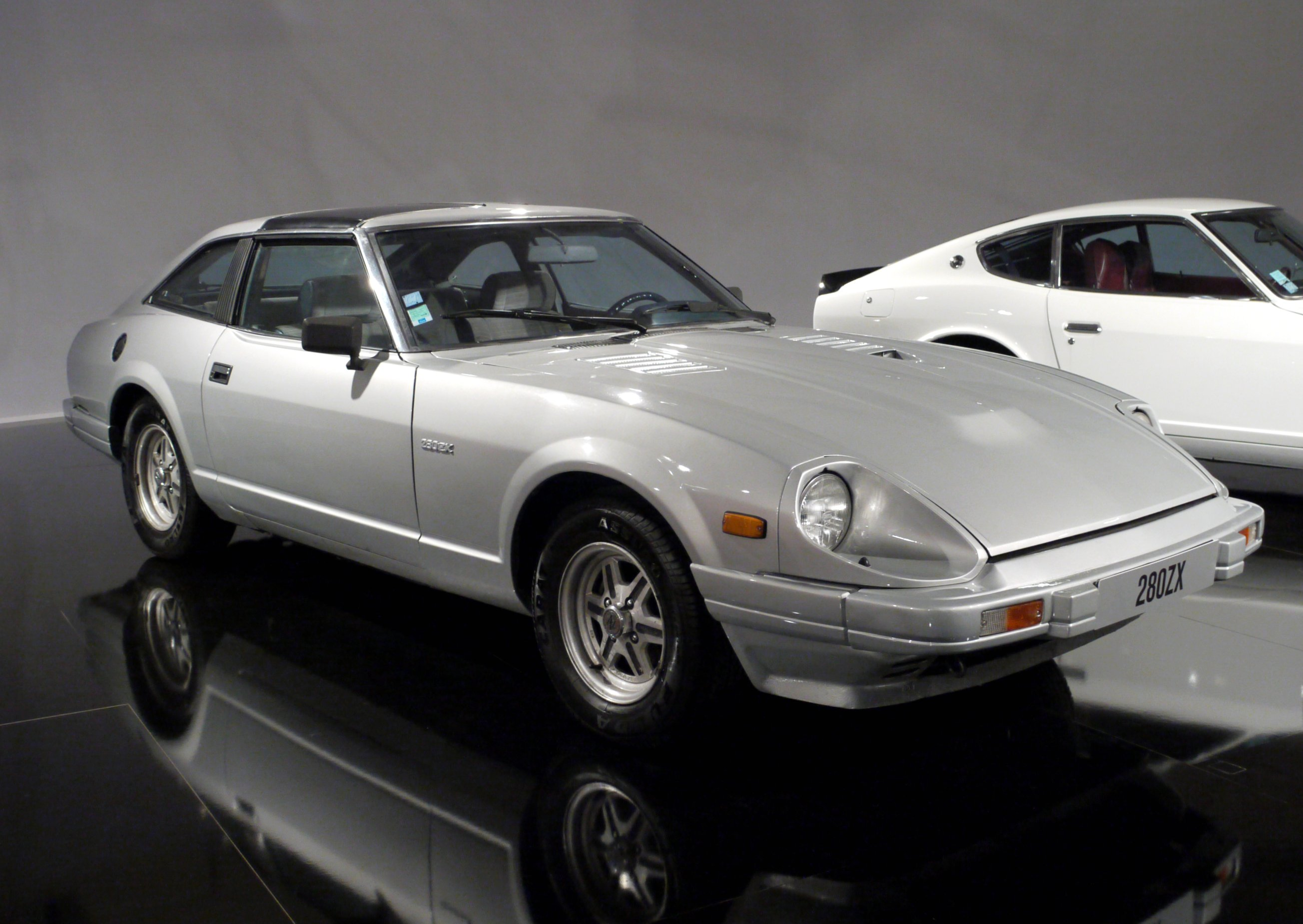
- 1982 Datsun 280ZX 2+2 (Europe)

Overview
- Manufacturer: Nissan
- Also called: Datsun 280ZX; Nissan Fairlady Z
- Production: June 1978–1983
- Assembly: Japan: Hiratsuka, Kanagawa (Nissan Shatai Plant)

Body and chassis
- Class: Sports car/Grand tourer
- Body style: 3-door fastback
- Layout: Front mid-engine, rear-wheel-drive

Powertrain
- Engine: 2.0 L L20E I6; 2.0 L L20ET turbo I6; 2.8 L L28E I6; 2.8 L L28ET turbo I6
- Transmission: 4-speed manual 5-speed manual 5-speed Borg-Warner T-5 manual 3-speed Jatco 3N71B automatic

Dimensions
- Wheelbase: 2,320 mm (91.3 in) 2-seater 2,520 mm (99.2 in) 2+2
- Length: 4,420 mm (174.0 in) 2-seater 4,620 mm (181.9 in) 2+2
- Width: 1,690 mm (66.5 in)
- Height: 1,295 mm (51.0 in) 2-seater 1,305 mm (51.4 in) 2+2
- Curb weight: 1,281 kg (2,824 lb) 2-seater 1,356 kg (2,989 lb) 2+2

Chronology
- Predecessor: Nissan Fairlady Z (S30)
- Successor: Nissan 300ZX (Z31)

The Nissan S130 is a sports coupé produced by Nissan in Japan from 1978 until 1983. It was sold as the Datsun 280ZX, Nissan Fairlady Z and Nissan Fairlady 280Z, depending on the market. In Japan, it was exclusive to Nissan Bluebird Store locations. It was the second generation Z-car, replacing the Nissan Fairlady Z (S30) in late 1978. The 280ZX was the first time the "by Nissan" subscript was badged alongside the Datsun logo, along with Nissan trucks. The 280ZX was Motor Trend's import car of the year for 1979. The 280ZX was replaced by the Nissan 300ZX in 1984.

== Design goals ==
The 280ZX was a complete redesign, retaining only the L28 inline-six engine and other driveline components from the 280Z. Both two-seat and four-seat (2+2) designs were offered. Compared to the more overtly sporting earlier models, the 280ZX was a much softer, heavier car, with less focus on driving and more on driver comfort and refinement. Softer suspension, better sound insulation, more comfortable seats, and ample equipment including high-end audio systems defined the new ZX. In the spirit of the times, emissions controls and aerodynamics were markedly improved over the first generation Z-cars, while weight was down somewhat as long as the buyer did not pick much from the very long options list. The exterior design was evolutionary, less rounded and with better integrated safety bumpers. Many parts, including the rear-axle and the power steering came from the Datsun 810 luxury sedan. Most of the design effort went into the entirely different and much more modern interior. The car became a grand tourer rather than a sports car, particularly in the plush Grand Luxury versions.

== Engineering ==
The 280ZX adopted a suspension similar to that of the concurrent Bluebird 910, with MacPherson struts in front and semi-trailing arm independent suspension in the rear. The wheelbase was up from its predecessor (90.7 in or 2,304 mm) to 91.3 in (2,319 mm) for the two-seater.

The 280ZX's body was redesigned with aerodynamics in mind. By closing in the open grille of the first generation Z-car and through other improvements taken from wind-tunnel testing, the drag coefficient was reduced from 0.467 to 0.385, and the lift coefficient from 0.41 to 0.14. The new design had a lower center-of-gravity and nearly 50/50 weight distribution in both the two-seater and 2+2 designs. The rear of the car was stretched to accommodate a larger 80 L (21.133 US liquid gallons) fuel tank. Overall, the new body design gave better fuel economy and high-speed stability (one of the known issues from the first generation Z-car).

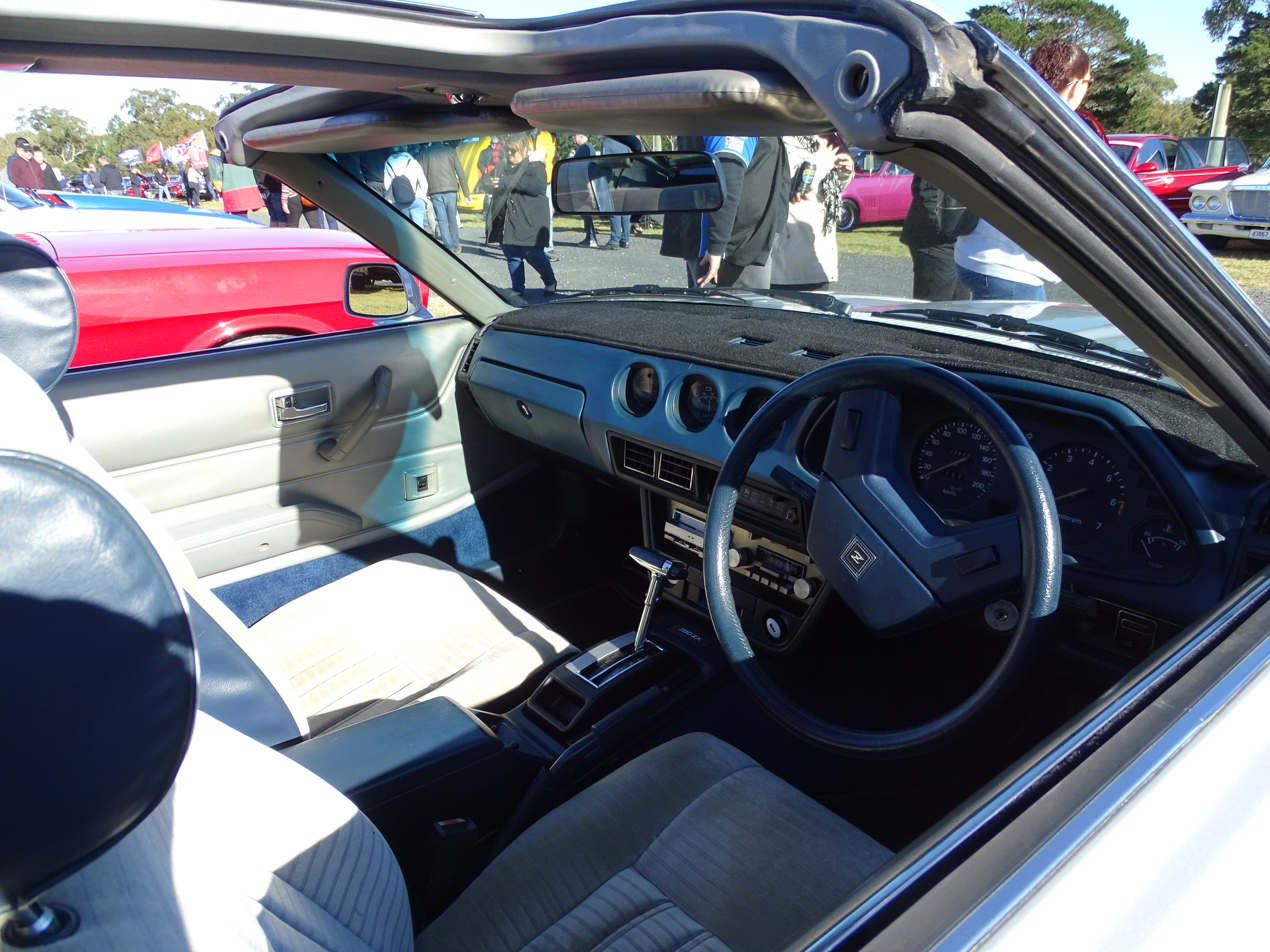
Interior view with the T-tops removed

The 280ZX initially offered either unassisted rack-and-pinion steering or a Datsun 810-derived recirculating-ball with power assistance. Neither came in for much appreciation in period road tests. A new power-assisted rack-and-pinion steering replaced the recirculating-ball steering system for the 1981 turbo, becoming available on the naturally aspirated models the following year.

It is a common misconception that the 280ZX's L28 engine is less powerful than the L24 engine of the 1970 240Z or the L26 engine of the 260Z; the difference is due to Nissan adopting the SAE net standard of power measurement, which resulted in lower power ratings than the earlier gross figures and added emissions. However, Nissan designers deliberately sacrificed raw acceleration for improved fuel economy in the 280ZX, so the early 1979 models rated at 135 hp (101 kW) actually had slower acceleration than the 240Z, largely due to increases in weight and taller gearing, as well as power losses to emissions controls. This overall performance deficit was not addressed until the release of the 280ZX Turbo in 1981.

| | Net HP | Gross HP |
|---|---|---|
| 240Z (70–73) | 121 | 151 |
| 260Z (74) | 130 | 162 |
| 280Z (75–78) | 136 | 170 |
| 280ZX (79–80) | 135 | N/A |
| 280ZX NA (81–83) | 145 | N/A |
| 280ZX T (81–83) | 180 | N/A |

== Marketing and sales ==
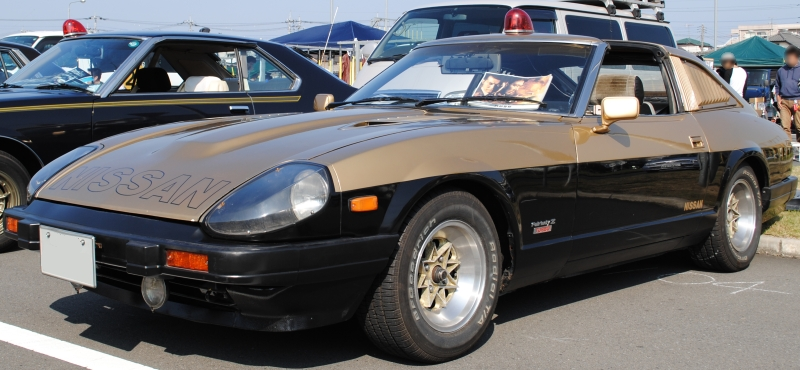
A Nissan Fairlady Z 200Z-T, replica of Super Z from the Japanese TV show Seibu Keisatsu

The 280ZX was branded in the North American and Australian markets as the "Datsun 280ZX"; and in the local Japanese market as the "Fairlady Z". For the 1979 model year, in the American market, it was co-branded "Datsun by Nissan" through the 1983 model year. These were considered transitional years, as Nissan began to phase in their new global brand under the Nissan name.

The Japanese market got both 2.0 L and 2.8 L engines. The 2.0 L-engined Fairlady 200Z used the L20 engine common in Nissan family cars of the same era. The smaller engine was offered so that it would comply with Japanese government dimension regulations, while models with the larger engine were regarded as the top-level luxury model in Japan. Export markets all got the L28-powered version. In Japan the Fairlady was joined by a Nissan Skyline-derived sedan and coupé, called the Nissan Leopard TR-X, available at Nissan Japanese dealerships called "Nissan Bluebird Stores".

Two trim levels were offered in North America, with a no-frills two-seater and a fully equipped 2+2 GL. The GL package was also available for the two-seater, carrying the full equipment list. Leather seats were optional, and an optional digital instrument cluster was introduced in 1982. The T-bar roof was available on both bodystyles, but only in combination with the GL package. A "Blackout" package, without most of the chrome brightwork, was available for the standard two-seater.

South Africa

CAR magazine in South Africa ran an article on the 280 ZX in October 1981 to introduce the model. At the time, there was an expectation that the local Nissan plant (then known as Nissan Datsun South Africa) would produce about 500 units. South African models used an L28-E six-cylinder motor similar to international specifications. However, it retained the "Datsun" branding on the cylinder cover. The reason was that the South African models used the same engine that powered the locally built Datsun Laurel 2.8 SGL, Nissan's then flagship model in South Africa, and South African-built engines hadn't yet transitioned to the "Nissan" branding. South African production between 1982 and 1988 was as follows:

- 1982–217 units
- 1983–139 units
- 1984–98 units
- 1985–5 units

== Changes ==
=== 1979–1980 ===
Early reviews of the 280ZX were mixed. Some lamented the transformation the Z-car had made to a grand tourer, while others appreciated the improvements in refinement, comfort, and overall market appeal. The sales figures soon proved the Nissan designers right, with the 280ZX becoming a sales success.

In 1979 Datsun homologated a high-downforce "whale-tail" type spoiler for the Datsun 280ZX by producing 1,001 280ZX-R cars; this allowed for use of this aerodynamic aid in IMSA and SCCA racing. These cars also had distinctive body decals and ZX-R logos. These cars were identical to the other cars of this year with the exception of the spoiler and decal package. Successful IMSA racer Don Devendorf was involved in the development of the spoiler.

From 1980 onwards, the 280ZX was available with a T-bar roof (on both the two-seater and 2+2 body styles). The T-bar roof panels could be removed and stored in bags in the rear of the car. The 280 ZX Turbo, adding an Airesearch turbocharger to the L28E engine, was first presented in late 1979, producing 200 PS DIN (147 kW; 197 hp). This was the first turbocharged, production Japanese automobile.

In 1980, a limited edition "10th anniversary" car was released. Available in either black and gold or black and red two-tone paint, these cars came with leather seating, and other special trim features. A total of 3,000 of these cars were built - - 2,500 in black and gold, and 500 in red and black.

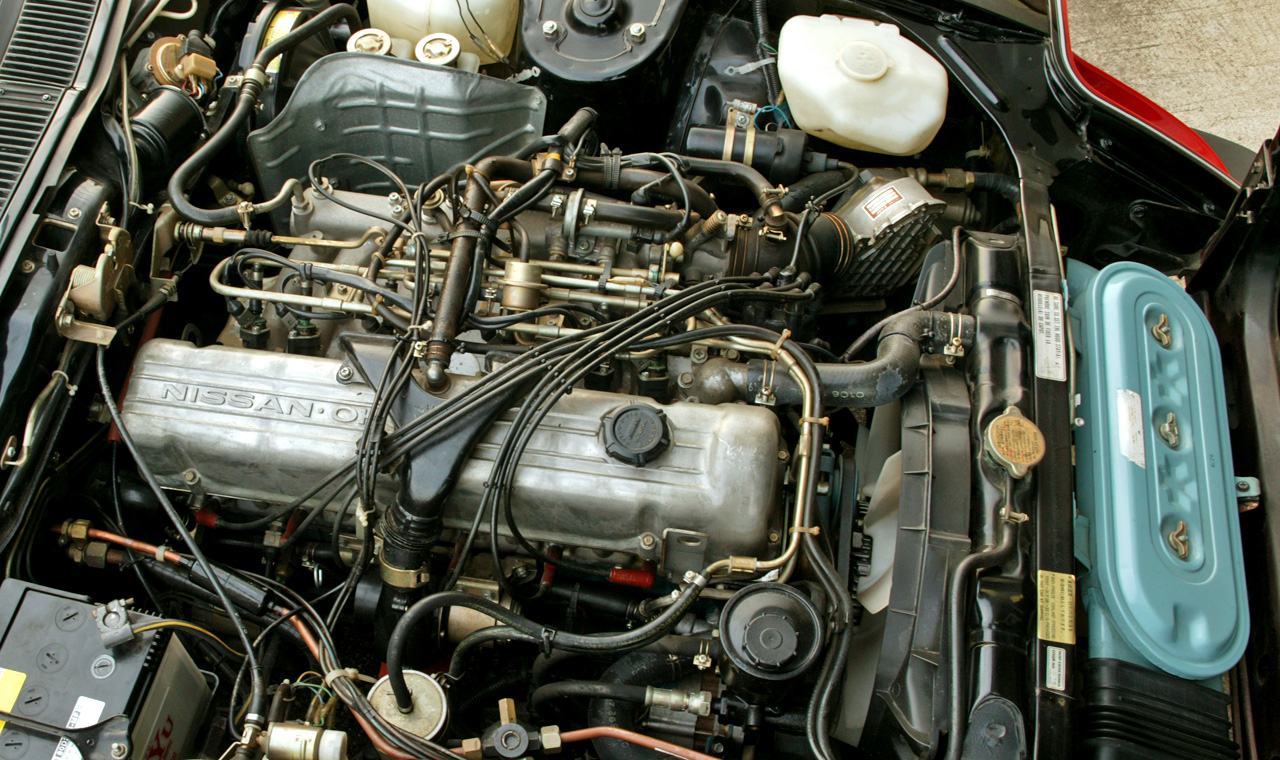
Nissan L28ET engine in a Datsun 280ZX

=== 1981 ===
A turbocharged model, using the L28ET engine rated at 180 bhp (134 kW; 182 PS) at 5,600 rpm and 203 lb⋅ft (275 N⋅m) of torque at 2,800 rpm, was introduced to the US export market in 1981. At the same time the Japanese domestic market received L20ET (2 L turbo) in both manual and automatic transmissions. Nissan's concerns about the reliability of their own five-speed transmission when combined with the additional torque of the 2.8 L turbo engine, meant that no manual transmission was offered with the L28ET engine for the 1981 model year. Other export markets (Europe and Australia) continued to receive only the normally aspirated 2.8 L engine with manual or automatic transmission. This engine was considered too powerful to receive type approval by Japan's Ministry of Transportation, who would only allow turbochargers to be installed in sub 2 litre-engined cars, and it was therefore never sold in its homeland.

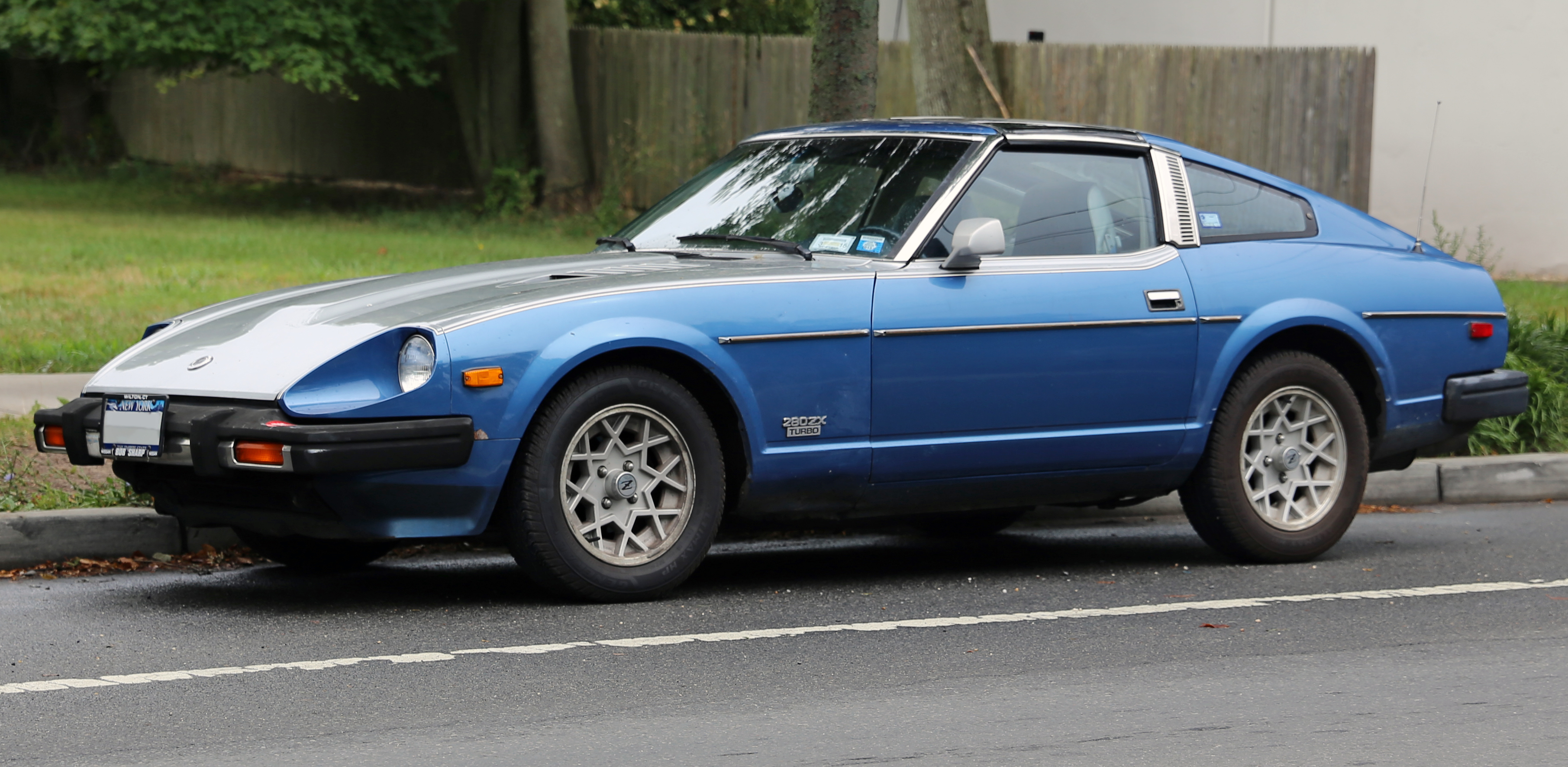
Datsun 280ZX Turbo

The turbocharged 280ZX used a single Garrett AiResearch TB03 turbocharger with an internal wastegate, and no intercooler. Nissan's design philosophy at the time led to boost being limited to 6.8 psi (0.47 bar), despite the lowered compression of the turbo engine (7.4:1 with dished, cast aluminum pistons). Additional changes over the naturally aspirated engine included a higher volume oil pump, an oil cooler on automatic models, and Nissan's Electronic Concentrated Control System (ECCS).

Series II (above) and Series I (below)

At the time of its release into the US market, the 280ZX turbo was the fastest Japanese import on the American market. The turbocharged 280ZX with a three-speed automatic delivered 0–60 mph (97 km/h) times of 7.4 seconds and a very respectable quarter mile time of 16.6 seconds, at a top speed of 130 mph (209 km/h).

One criticism of the early 280ZX was a reduction in spring rates, giving a softer ride and making the car rather difficult to drive hard through corners without transient oversteer, which was a feature of trailing-arm rear suspensions. The release of the turbocharged model in 1981 saw the introduction of a revised rear suspension, which Nissan continued to use in the 1982 and 1983 turbos, as well as the non-turbo from mid-1982 onward. Car and Driver had another complaint of the 280ZX turbo: in a 1981 comparison of several performance cars, they decided that while the acceleration was on par with other sports cars of the era, the braking system was prone to fading away completely before a lap could be completed on their test track.

=== 1982–1983 ===
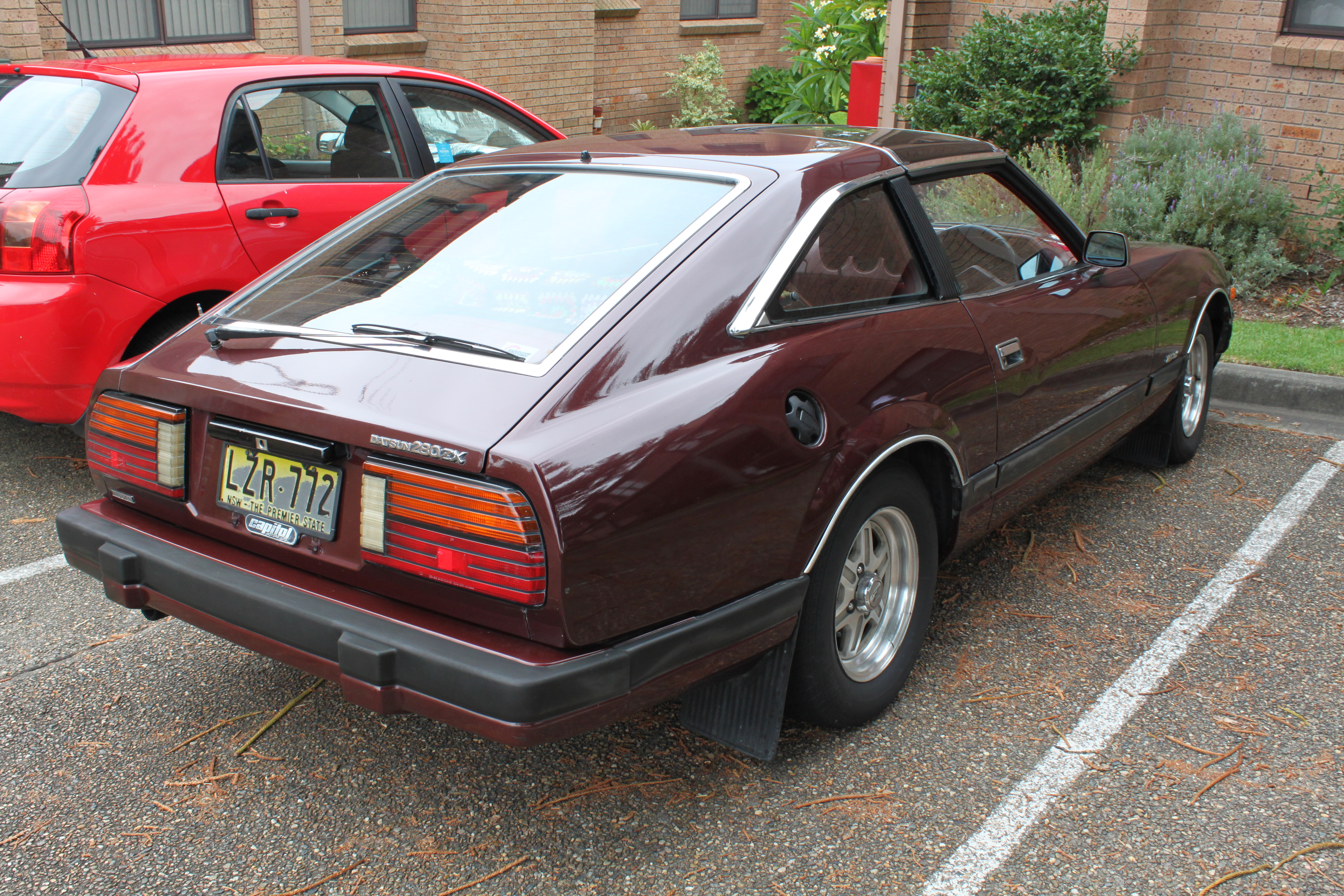
Rear view of facelifted model

Nissan gave the 280ZX a facelift in 1982, with revised NACA ducting in the hood, new alloy wheels (14-inch six-spoke alloys for non-turbo models, and 15-inch four-spoke alloys for turbo models), a revised B-pillar garnish, new pin-stripe style tail-lights, and rubber bumper over-riders replaced the earlier model's chrome and rubber items. The bumpers were now also body coloured and wrapped around further. Interior changes were minor but included new seat trim styling. The 1982 model also was the first to offer the popular voice warning system, which warned the driver when the headlights were left on after the vehicle was turned off, if the parking brake was on while the vehicle was in motion, and many others.

This facelifted model has since come to be called the "Series II" 280ZX.

Power steering became standard equipment with a new rack-and-pinion system, rather than recirculating ball. Changes were made to the rear suspension layout, which also meant the exhaust pipe now exited from the left, rather than right-hand side. The rear brake calipers and rotors were also changed and the drive shafts (half shafts) were upgraded from universal joints to constant velocity joints on certain models.

As in 1981, both turbo and naturally aspirated engines were offered, but non-turbo cars now used the uprated L20E for the Japanese market or the L28E for the export market, which on the 2.8 L version, due to increased compression, were rated at 145 hp (108 kW) rather than the earlier engine's 135 hp (101 kW). The naturally aspirated 1982 Datsun 280ZX had a 0-60 mph time of 9.1 seconds, 1.2 seconds slower than the Corvette of the same year. The 280ZX Turbo manual had a 0-60 mph time of 7.4 seconds, while the automatic managed to turn out 7.1 seconds. That compares to the Aston Martin Volante, which had a 0-60 mph time of 8.9 seconds at almost seven times the cost, and the Ferrari 308GTSi, which had a 0-60 mph time of 7.9 seconds. The only US-market car in 1982 to beat the Turbo ZX' acceleration figures was the Porsche 911SC. This information can be referenced in the R&T Guide to Sports & GT Cars (1982).

The (US market only) 280ZX Turbo was offered with a Borg-Warner T-5 5-speed manual transmission. This was one of the first Nissan and Japanese car in general which used a non-Japanese transmission; the T-5 was also used in the GM F-bodies and Ford Mustang in addition to numerous other American domestic vehicles. The T-5 was only available in 1982 and 1983 after which Nissan USA phased in the use of local automotive components - the 1981 Turbo had only been available with an automatic. Hitherto mainly sold in the US, in the second half of 1983 the 280ZXT Turbo also became available in Germany. It was the fastest, most expensive, and most powerful Japanese car offered to that point in Germany, with 200 PS DIN (147 kW; 197 hp).

Spring rates and sway bars were revised, which largely addressed the handling nervousness of the early 280ZX Turbo, and reviews confirmed that the 1982 280ZX Turbo was the most sporting Z-car since the original 240Z of 1970.

== Racing ==
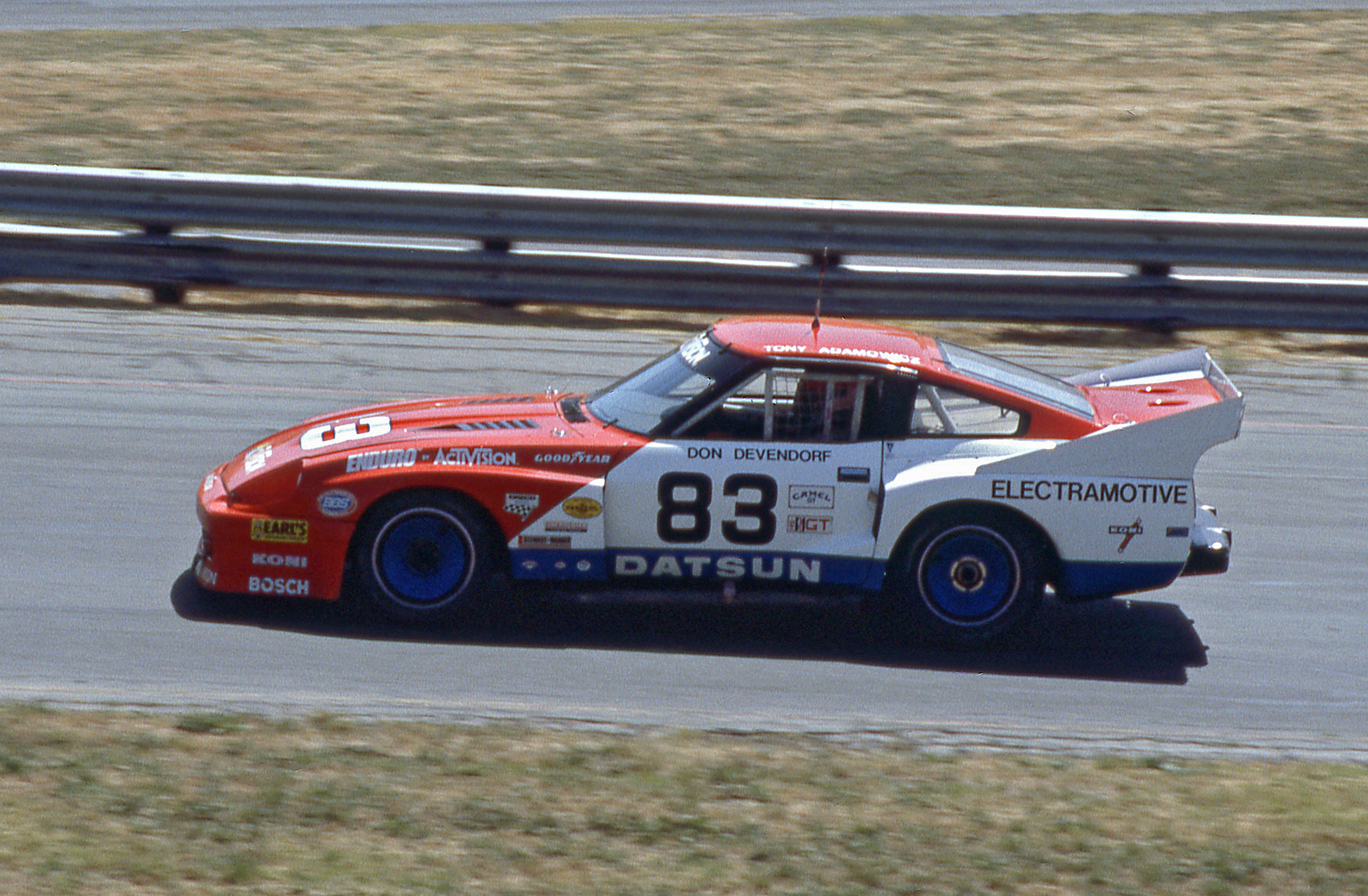
Don Devendorf and Tony Adamowicz drove a Datsun 280ZX Turbo to the 1983 IMSA GTO Championship.

The 280ZX proved successful in various classes of racing, particularly in the US. Significant results include:

- 1979 SCCA C Production Category (Bob Sharp Racing 280ZX)
- 1979 and 1980 IMSA GTU Championship (Electramotive Datsun 280ZX)
- 1982 and 1983 IMSA GTO Championship (Electramotive Datsun 280ZX Turbo)

The 1983 Electramotive 280ZX Turbo produced over 700 hp (522 kW), and reached a terminal speed of 140 mph (230 km/h) in the standing quarter mile.

The most notable driver to be associated with the car was actor Paul Newman, who raced with the Bob Sharp Racing team. He also helped to promote the car and starred in a series of commercials.

== See also ==
- Nissan Z-car
- Nissan L engine
