= Multi-stage fitness test =

Aerobic capacity test

The multi-stage fitness test (MSFT), also known as the beep test, bleep test, PACER test (progressive aerobic cardiovascular endurance run), or the 20m shuttle run test, is a multi-stage running test used to estimate an athlete's aerobic capacity (VO_{2} max). The test gets progressively more difficult as it continues.

The test requires participants to run 20 meters back and forth across a marked track keeping time with beeps. Every minute, the time between beeps gets shorter, and participants must run faster. If a participant fails to reach the relevant marker in time, they are cautioned. A second caution ends the test for that runner. The number of shuttles completed is recorded as the score of that runner. The score is recorded in "Level.Shuttles" format (e.g. 9.5). The maximum number of laps on the 20-meter PACER test is 247.

The test is used by sporting organizations around the world along with schools, the military, and others interested in gauging cardiovascular endurance, an important component of overall physical fitness. The multi-stage fitness test is also part of most health-related fitness test batteries for children and adolescents, such as Eurofit, Alpha-fit, FitnessGram and ASSOFTB.

A voice track is often included, with various tones to represent the end of laps and levels. The most known one was recorded by Roger Francisco in Champaign, Illinois in 1982.

The multi-stage fitness test was first described by Canadian kinesiologist Luc Léger with the original 1-minute protocol, which starts at a speed of 8.5 km/h, and increases by 0.5 km/h each minute. Other variations of the test have also been developed, where the protocol starts at a speed of 8.0 km/h and with either 1 or 2-minute stages, but the original protocol is nevertheless recommended. The test appears to encourage maximal effort by most children. Additionally, the test's prediction of aerobic capacity is valid for most individuals, including those who are overweight or obese.

== Procedure ==
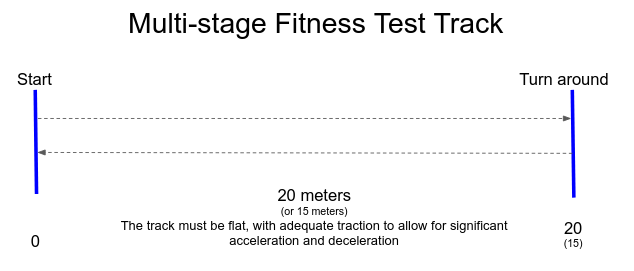

Prior to the test commencing, runners line up at the 0m marker, facing the 20m marker. Following a countdown, a double beep or voice cue signals the start.

1. Runners commence running towards the 20m marker
2. At or before the following beep, runners must reach the 20m marker. Touching with a single foot is acceptable
3. At or after, but not before, the same beep, runners commence running back to the 0m marker
4. At or before the next beep, runners must reach the 0m marker
5. At or after, but not before, the same beep, runners start the next circuit (i.e. back to Step 1)

Every minute or so, the level changes. This is signaled, usually, by a double beep or, possibly, a voice cue. The required speed at the new speed level will be 0.5 km/h faster.

Notes: The distance between the "start" and "turn around" markers is usually 20m; however, the test can also be carried out using a 15m track. Shuttle completion times are modified in proportion.

Léger specified a 1-minute protocol: that is, each level was meant to last approximately 1 minute. However, because speed changes mid-shuttle confuses matters, the algorithm for a change in level is as follows: "the next level commences on completion of the current shuttle when the absolute difference between the time spent at the level and 60 seconds is the least".

=== Scoring ===
A runner who fails to reach the relevant marker in time is cautioned; if they want to continue, they must touch the marker before turning back. Two consecutive failures terminates their attempt. Their most recent completed shuttle is marked as their score.

Scoring is usually done using "Level.Shuttle" terminology; for example, 10.2, which means "completed 2 shuttles at level 10".

== Estimating VO2 max ==
VO_{2} max, or milliliters of oxygen per kilogram of body mass per minute (e.g., mL/(kg·min)), is considered an excellent proxy for aerobic fitness. Attempts have been made to correlate MSFT scores with VO_{2} max. Do note that such estimations are fraught with difficulty as test scores, while substantially dependent on VO_{2} max, also depend on running efficiency, test familiarity, anaerobic capacity, personal drive, ambient temperature, running equipment (floor, shoes) and other factors.

A paper by Flouris, et al. (2005) determined the following:

$VO_2 \max = (\text{maximal attained speed}_{\text{in} \ \text{km/h}} \times 6.55 - 35.8)$

An earlier paper by Ramsbottom, et al. (1988) suggested the following:

$VO_2 \max = 14.4 + (\text{Level} \times 3.48)$

== Variations ==
Luc Léger, the originator of the multi-stage fitness test, never did patent it. Consequently, organizations around the world have been able to incorporate subtle variations into the test. The most common variations are:

=== First level at 8.0 km/h ===
The Léger test requires the first level to be run at 8.5 km/h. Some organizations require it to be run at 8.0 km/h. Note that the second level is always run at 9.0 km/h. Also, speeds at subsequent levels always increment by 0.5 km/h. The impact of this variation is insignificant as almost all runners' scores easily exceed level 1.

=== Time spent at each level ===
All versions of the test evaluate for a change of level only on completion of shuttles. The Léger test's algorithm requires that each level lasts approximately 60 seconds. This means the next level commences when the absolute difference between the time spent at the level and 60 seconds is least. Put simply, some levels may run for a trifle less than 60 seconds, others a little more than 60 seconds and the odd one exactly 60 seconds. On the other hand, a few non-Léger versions of the test trigger a level change only when the time spent at a level first exceeds 60 seconds. This variation results in one extra shuttle being run at some levels.

In practice, since the speed change at a new level (rather than an extra lap) is most likely to trigger "failure", this variation also has an insignificant change on one's achievable score.

=== Scoring starts from zero ===
Scoring of the Léger test starts from 1. That is, at the end of the very first shuttle, the participant has scored 1.1. A variation has scoring starting from 0; at the end of the first shuttle, the runner has achieved 0.1. The impact of this variation is purely administrative: just add or subtract 1 level to convert scores.

== World record ==
=== Participation ===
The Guinness World Record for the largest group beep test is held by Army Foundation College, in Harrogate, North Yorkshire; 941 people took part.

== In popular culture ==
The introductory explanation of one multi-stage fitness test, the FitnessGram PACER test, has been widely spread as a copypasta, meme, and through other comedic ways due to the test's modern use in schools, primarily in physical education classes.

== See also ==
- Harvard step test, a cardiovascular test
- Physical fitness test
- Yo-Yo intermittent test
