= Harvard step test =

Fitness test

- Purpose: cardiac stress test

The Harvard step test, in scientific literature sometimes referred to as the Brouha Test, is a type of cardiac stress test for detecting and diagnosing cardiovascular disease. It is also a good measurement of fitness and a person's ability to recover after a strenuous exercise by checking the recovery rate. The test was developed by Lucien Brouha and his associates in 1942.

== Procedure ==
The test subject repeatedly steps onto and off of a platform every two seconds. The height of the platform is 20 inches or 51 centimetres for men and 16 inches or 41 centimetres for women. The rate of 30 steps per minute must be sustained for five minutes or until exhaustion. To ensure the right speed, a metronome is used. Exhaustion is the point at which the subject cannot maintain the stepping rate for 15 seconds. The subject immediately sits down on completion of the test, and the heartbeats are counted for 1 to 1.5, 2 to 2.5, and 3 to 3.5 minutes.

The results are written down as time until exhaustion in seconds ($t_e$) and total heartbeats counted ($h_b$). It is plotted into a simple fitness index equation:

$$\frac{t_e * 100}{h_b * 2}$$

The outcome of the equation is rated as follows:

Rating	Fitness index
Excellent	> 96
Good	83–96
Average	68–82
Low average	54–67
Poor	< 54

== Modified versions ==
The test was developed at Harvard University in 1942. Several modified versions of the original Harvard step test exist; examples include the Tecumseh step test and the Kasch step test. Another modified version, the Sharkey step test, was developed in the 1970s for use by the United States Forest Service at the University of Montana in Missoula.

== See also ==
- Multi-stage fitness
- Cardiology
- Cardiology diagnostic tests and procedures
- Electrocardiogram
- Physical fitness
- Work Capacity Test
