= Datsun 810 =

The Datsun 810 is a mid-size car that was sold in North America by the Japanese automobile manufacturer Datsun between February 1977 and 1981. Datsun based the first generation—sold for model years 1977 to 1980—on the four-cylinder Datsun Bluebird (810), but with a longer engine bay to accommodate larger straight-six engines. These original 810s were available as a sedan and station wagon initially, with a hardtop coupe introduced in January 1979 for the 1979 model year.

Second generation models were sold between 1980 and 1981 for the 1981 model year only. Derived from the Datsun Bluebird (910), both sedan and wagon body types were offered. These second generation cars were renamed in 1981 for the 1982 model year as Datsun Maxima.

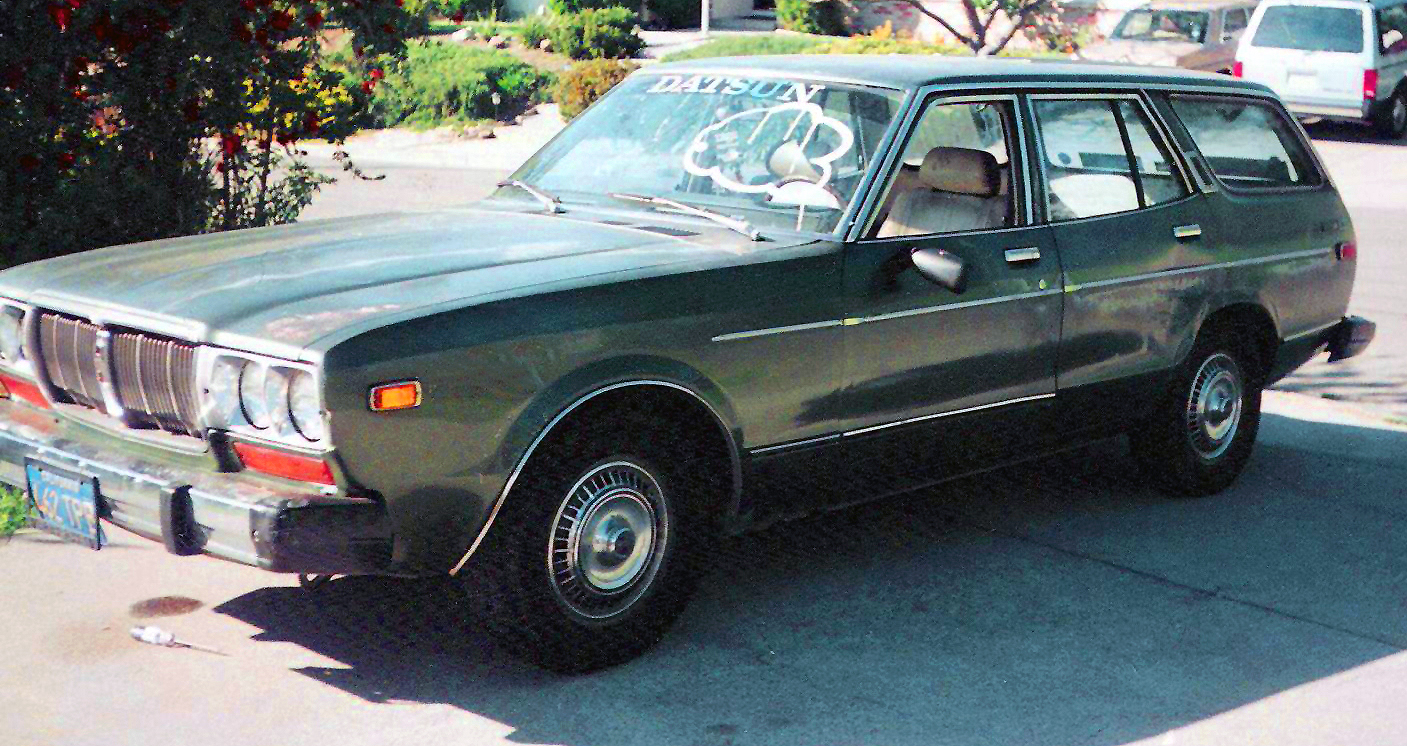
First generation (1977–1980)

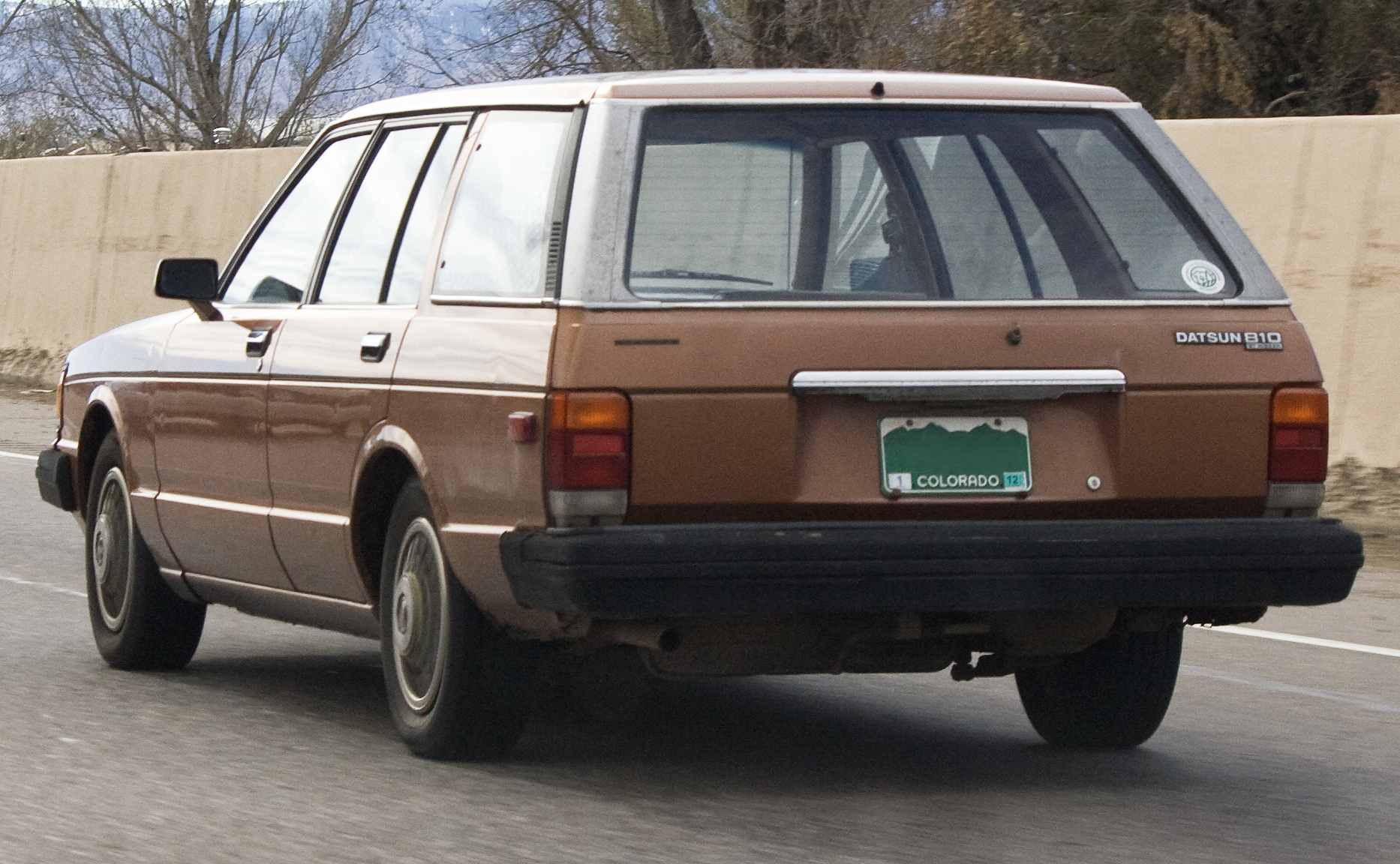
Second generation (1980–1981)
