= Work Capacity Test =

U.S. Forest Service physical test for wildland firefighters

The Work Capacity Test (WCT), known informally as the pack test, is a U.S. Forest Service physical test for wildland firefighters. The pack test is intentionally stressful as it tests the capacity of muscular strength and aerobic endurance of the firefighter. There are three tests known as arduous, moderate, and light. The pack test may be given as part of the S-130/S-190 basic wildland firefighter course.

The pack test replaced as of the late 1990s an earlier physical fitness test called the step test, which measured physical fitness based on beginning and ending heart rate after a short workout on a set of stairs. It was believed that the pack test more accurately measures the ability to perform arduous labor for a sustained period of time (e.g. 45 minutes) than the step test. Besides the U.S. Forest Service, all other federal and most other state and private agencies also use the pack test although there are a few state and private agencies which still use the step test.

== Pre-test training ==
Before a firefighter can begin training for the test, they must fill out a Health Screening Questionnaire (HSQ). This must be done prior to conditioning for, or taking, any level of the Work Capacity Tests (WCT). The HSQ is reviewed by a Human Resource Office and they will determine whether a person is cleared to start conditioning. This is very important because heart attacks due to stressful physical activity are a leading cause of firefighter deaths on the firelines.

Once cleared for training, the firefighter will need to train a minimum of 4 weeks before the test with the boots and gear needed for the job. It is recommended that the firefighter train for the arduous test by building up their aerobic fitness, first by hiking 3 miles with no pack, then by jogging on a flat course without a pack, then later add the pack and hike hills to build leg strength. Increase weight slowly until the firefighter can hike 3 miles in 45 minutes while carrying 45 pounds.

== Arduous pack test ==
Arduous: involves field work calling for above-average endurance and superior conditioning. All firefighters are required to perform arduous duty. This test level is required by the U.S. Forest Service and most other agencies to fight fire in the United States. Also in the Australian States of NSW, Vic, SA and Tas for Arduous Duty and Remote Area Firefighters.

Requirements: 3-mile hike with 45 lb pack in 45 minutes. No jogging or running.

== Moderate field test ==
Moderate: involves field work requiring complete control of physical faculties and may include considerable walking, standing, and lifting 25-50 lbs. Safety officers and fire behavior analysts are examples of moderate duty positions. This test level is accepted by most states and by the U.S. Forest Service under some cooperative agreements.

Requirements: 2-mile walk with 25 lb pack in 30 minutes. No jogging or running.

== Light walk test ==
Light: involves mainly office-type work with occasional field activity. Examples include staging area and helibase managers. Although it is part of the pack test, there is no pack for the light test.

Requirements: 1-mile hike with no pack in 16 minutes. No jogging or running.

== Warning ==
The USFS warns that "before you begin to train for testing or substantially increase your level of activity, consult your physician. This is especially important if you are over 40 and have been inactive, have a history of a heart condition or chest pain or loss of balance, or have a joint or bone problem that could be made worse by a change in physical activity."
