= S-130/S-190 training courses =

Firefighter training courses

In wildland fire suppression in the United States, S-130/S-190 refers to the basic wildland fire training course required of all firefighters before they can work on the firelines.

Wildland fire training in the U.S. has been standardized by the National Wildfire Coordinating Group since the 1970s. The same basic courses are given across all agencies involved in wildland firefighting and controlled burning, including:

- Federal agencies such as the United States Forest Service, the National Park Service and the Bureau of Land Management
- State agencies such as the California Department of Forestry and Fire Protection and New Jersey Forest Fire Service
- Private organizations such as The Nature Conservancy which conduct prescribed burns
- Youth conservation corps type programs such as Americorps involved in wildfire suppression and prescribed burning
- Municipal and rural fire departments which fight brush fires and wildland/urban interface fires
- Private contractors who contract with government agencies to help fight fires

A recent trend in some states is to hold an annual statewide wildfire academy in which students from different agencies, from federal agencies to local volunteer fire departments, can take these courses. This is now done, for example, in Virginia, Utah, Arizona, Pennsylvania, and Nebraska among other states. Colorado Firecamp is the only wildfire academy to teach the S-130/S-190 course year round.

S-130 and S-190 are actually two different courses. But since they are usually taken together the basic wildland fire training is called "S-130/S-190" or "S-130/190" for short. Basic wildland fire training also includes some other courses. The full list of courses usually included in "S-130/S-190" is:

- S-130: Firefighter Training
- S-190: Introduction to Wildland Fire Behavior
- I-100: Introduction to the Incident Command System
- L-180: Human Factors in the Wildland Fire Service (a recent addition to basic wildland fire training)

Training manuals for these courses are published by the National Wildfire Coordinating Group. There are also more advanced and specialized courses not covered in the basic wildland fire training.

The work capacity test ("pack test") is also usually given during the course. Passing S-130/190 and the pack test are both required to fight wildfires. After successful completion of both, you are able to receive a qualification card known as a "red card". Holding a current "red card" indicates that you are qualified to work on the firelines, as well as other disasters, as determined by the Federal Government. This "Red Card" is not included, and if you are a member of a VFD, must be obtained separately.

S-130/190 is also increasingly being offered at a handful of colleges as part of their fire science or forestry degree programs. At a few 4-year colleges those in the class will actually be part of a working hand crew chartered by the college for the rest of the semester or quarter, after completing the basic course and the pack test. At most (2-year community colleges) it is just a short, 1 credit hour course.
