= List of Nissan vehicles =

Nissan has designed, assembled and/or sold the following vehicles.

The main markets column are meant to roughly show which region the vehicle is targeted to, and where roughly the car is currently being on sale. It might not accurately show the countries where the vehicle is on sale.

== Current models ==
=== Passenger vehicles ===
Body style	Model			Current model		Current main markets	Vehicle description
Body style	Image	Name(s)	Introduction (cal. year)	Introduction (model code)	Update (facelift)	Current main markets	Vehicle description
Hatchback		March	1982	2010 (K13)	2021	Latin America	Subcompact car (B-segment) Previous generation, continued production in various markets.
Hatchback		Micra	1982	2025 (K15)	—	Europe	Battery electric supermini / subcompact car (B-segment). Based on Renault 5 E-Tech.
Hatchback		Note	2004	2020 (E13)	2024	Japan, Hong Kong and Singapore	Subcompact car (B-segment) oriented for the Japanese market. E-Power powertrain available in Japan. Only produced in right hand drive.
Hatchback		Pixo	2009 (Pixo nameplate); 2026 (as a battery electric vehicle)	2026 (EV)	—	Europe	Battery electric city car (A-segment) oriented for the European market. Rebadged Renault Twingo E-Tech. Nameplate previously used for rebadged Suzuki A-Star between 2009 and 2013.
Sedan		Almera/ Versa/ Sunny	1995	2011 (N17)	2016	Egypt	Subcompact car (B-segment). Previous generation, continued production in Latin America as the V-Drive. Previously sold in Japan as the Latio.
Sedan		Almera/ Versa/ Sunny/ V-Drive	1995	2019 (N18)	2026 (N19)	Americas and Southeast Asia	Long range Subcompact car (B-segment).
Sedan		Altima	1992	2018 (L34)	2022	Americas, China and Middle East	Mid-size car (D-segment). Altima and Teana models were merged as one model in 2013.
Sedan		Teana	2003	2025 (L34)	—	China	Mid-size car (D-segment). Altima and Teana models were merged as one model in 2013.
Sedan		N6	2025	2025	—	China	Plug-in hybrid mid-size car (D-segment).
Sedan		N7/ Primera	2025; 1990 (Primera nameplate)	2025	—	China and Philippines	Battery electric mid-size car (D-segment).
Sedan		Sentra	1982	2026 (B19)	—	North America and Taiwan	Compact car (C-segment). Sylphy and Sentra models were merged as one model in 2012. Availability of the current generation is limited to few regions. E-Power powertrain available in China.
Sedan		Sylphy	2000	2026 (B19)	—	China	Compact car (C-segment). Sylphy and Sentra models were merged as one model in 2012. Availability of the current generation is limited to few regions. E-Power powertrain available in China.
Sedan		Skyline	1957	2014 (V37)	2019	Japan	Compact executive car, rebadged Infiniti Q50 for the Japanese market. The second oldest continuing Nissan nameplate.
SUV		Ariya	2020	2020 (FE0)	2026	Global developed markets	Battery electric two-row compact crossover SUV (C-segment).
SUV		Juke	2010	2019 (F16)	2022	Europe, Australasia, etc.	Subcompact crossover SUV (B-segment). Phased out in most markets, new generation introduced for Europe and Australia.
SUV		Juke	2010	2027 (F17)	—	Europe	Battery electric subcompact crossover SUV (B-segment).
SUV		Kait/ Kicks e-Power	2026	2026	—	South America, and Thailand	Subcompact crossover SUV (B-segment). Produced in Brazil and Thailand. Based on P15 Kicks.
SUV		Kicks	2016	2016 (P15)	2020	Americas, Japan, and Southeast Asia	Subcompact crossover SUV (B-segment). E-Power powertrain available in several markets.
SUV		Kicks	2016	2024 (P16)	—	Americas, Japan and Middle East	Subcompact crossover SUV (B-segment). E-Power powertrain available in Japan markets.
SUV		Leaf	2010	2025 (ZE2)	—	Global developed markets	Battery electric subcompact crossover SUV. Replaces the ZE1 Leaf Hatchback.
SUV		Magnite	2020	2020 (DD0)	2024	Global emerging markets	Entry-level subcompact crossover SUV (B-segment), smaller than Juke.
SUV		Murano	2002	2024 (Z53)	—	Japan and North America	Two-row mid-size crossover SUV (D-segment) which sits between the Rogue/X-Trail and Pathfinder.
SUV		NX7	2026	2026	—	China	Plug-in hybrid mid-size crossover SUV (D-segment).
SUV		NX8	2026	2026	—	China	Battery electric and plug-in hybrid mid-size crossover SUV (D-segment).
SUV		Pathfinder	1985	2021 (R53) 2023 (R53 Chinese Version)	2026 —	North America, Australasia, etc. China	Three-row mid-size crossover SUV (D-segment).
SUV		Patrol	1951	2024 (Y63)	—	Middle East, Australasia, etc.	Full-size body-on-frame SUV. The oldest continuing Nissan nameplate. To be sold in Japan from 2027.
SUV		Armada	2003	2024 (Y63)	—	North America	Full-size body-on-frame SUV. The oldest continuing Nissan nameplate. To be sold in Japan from 2027.
SUV		Qashqai	2007	2021 (J12)	2024	Europe, Australasia, etc.	Two-row compact crossover SUV (C-segment) slots between the Kicks or Juke and Rogue/X-Trail. E-Power powertrain available in Europe.
SUV		Rogue Plug-In Hybrid	2025	2025	—	North America	Three-row compact crossover SUV, Plug-in Hybrid option. Rebadged and restyled Mitsubishi Outlander Plug-In Hybrid.
SUV		Rogue	2007	2027 (T34)	—	Global	Two-row compact crossover SUV (C-segment). Three-row available in several markets. Rogue and X-Trail models were merged as one model in 2014. E-Power powertrain also available in Europe, Australasia, Türkiye, Israel and Morocco and the only one available in Japan.
SUV		X-Trail	2001	2021 (T33)	2025	Global	Two-row compact crossover SUV (C-segment). Three-row available in several markets. Rogue and X-Trail models were merged as one model in 2014. E-Power powertrain also available in Europe, Australasia, Türkiye, Israel and Morocco and the only one available in Japan.
SUV		Tekton	2026	2026	—	India and others	Subcompact crossover SUV initially for the Indian market, a rebadged and restyled Dacia Duster.
SUV		Terra/ X-Terra	2018	2018 (D23)	2020	Southeast Asia, China and Middle East	Mid-size body-on-frame SUV based on the Navara (D23).
MPV/ minivan		Elgrand	1997	2026 (E53)	—	Japan	Large MPV/minivan with sliding doors for the Japanese market and other Asian markets.
MPV/ minivan		Gravite	2026	2026 (T15)	—	India	Three-row mini MPV for the Indian market, a rebadged and restyled Renault Triber.
MPV/ minivan		Livina	2006	2019 (ND)	—	Southeast Asia	Three-row compact MPV, a rebadged and restyled Mitsubishi Xpander.
MPV/ minivan		Primastar	2021	2021	—	Europe	MPV version of the Primastar, also sold as the Renault Trafic.
MPV/ minivan	Facelift version	Serena	1991	2022 (C28)	2025	Japan, Hong Kong and Southeast Asia	Compact/medium MPV/minivan for the Japanese market. Hybrid and e-Power available.
MPV/ minivan		Townstar	2021	2021	—	Europe	LAV version of the Townstar, also sold as the Renault Kangoo.
Kei car		Dayz	2013	2019 (AA1)	2023	Japan	Semi-tall height wagon kei car with hinged rear doors. Developed by NMKV joint venture, also sold as the Mitsubishi eK.
Kei car		Roox	2009	2025 (BA2)	—	Japan	Tall-height wagon kei car with rear sliding doors. Developed by NMKV joint venture, also sold as the Mitsubishi eK Space.
Kei car		Sakura	2022	2022 (B6A)	—	Japan	Battery electric derivative of the Dayz.
Sports car		Z	1969	2022 (RZ34)	—	Japan, Americas, etc.	Two-seat sports car.

=== Light commercial vehicles ===
Body style	Model			Current model		Current main markets	Vehicle description
Body style	Image	Name(s)	Introduction (cal. year)	Introduction (model code)	Update (facelift)	Current main markets	Vehicle description
Pickup truck		Navara	1985	2014 (D23)	2020	Global (except U.S. and Canada)	Pickup truck with single cabin and double cabin options.
Pickup truck		Navara	1985	2026 (D27)	—	Australia	Latest generation of the Navara mid-size pickup truck, a rebadged and restyled Mitsubishi Triton.
Pickup truck		Frontier	1997	2021 (D41)	2024	North America	Originally a renamed Navara, since the D41 model the North American-market Frontier is a standalone model.
Pickup truck		Frontier Pro/Navara Pro	2025	2025	—	China, Mexico and Middle East	Plug-in hybrid pickup truck, rebadged Dongfeng Z9.
Pickup truck		Clipper Truck	2003	2013	2026	Japan	Kei truck, rebadged Suzuki Carry. Formerly as NT100 Clipper until 2024.
Van		Caravan/ Urvan	1973	2012 (E26)	2021	Asia, Africa and Latin America	Medium van.
Van		Interstar	2003	2024	—	Europe	Large van. Rebadged Renault Master. Renamed from Nissan NV400 since 2021.
Van		Clipper Van	2003	2013	2015	Japan	Kei van, rebadged Suzuki Every. Formerly as NV100 Clipper until 2024.
Van		Clipper EV	2024	–	–	Japan	Kei van, rebadged Mitsubishi Minicab EV.
Van		NV200	2009	2009 (M20)	—	Global	Small/compact van.
Van		Primastar	2014	2014	2021	Europe	Medium van. Rebadged Renault Trafic. Renamed from Nissan NV300 since 2021.
Van		Townstar	2021	2021	—	Europe	Small van. Rebadged Renault Kangoo, successor to the Nissan NV250.

=== Heavy commercial vehicles ===
Model	Calendar year introduced	Current model
Model	Calendar year introduced	Introduction
Cabstar	1968	2007
Atlas	1982	2023

== Former Datsun models ==
- 1914 Dat Type 31
- 1921 Dat Lila
- 1930 Dat Type 91
- 1931 Datsun Type 10
- 1932 Datsun Type 11
- 1932–1941 Datsun Roadster
- 1933 Datsun Type 12
- 1934–1935 Datsun Type 13
- 1934–1935 Datsun 13T Pickup
- 1935–1936 Datsun Type 14
- 1935–1936 Datsun 14T Pickup
- 1936 Datsun NL-75
- 1936 Datsun NL-76
- 1936–1937 Datsun Type 15
- 1936–1938 Datsun 15T Pickup
- 1937–1938 Datsun Type 16
- 1937–1944 Datsun 17T Pickup
- 1938–1940 Datsun Type 17
- 1946–1947 Datsun 1121 Pickup
- 1946–1949 Datsun 2124 Pickup
- 1947–1948 Datsun DA
- 1948–1954 Datsun DB series
  - 1948 Datsun DB
  - 1949–1950 Datsun DB-2
  - 1951–1952 Datsun DB-4
  - 1953 Datsun DB-5
  - 1954 Datsun DB-6
- 1949–1950 Datsun 3135 Pickup
- 1950–1951 Datsun DW Series
  - 1950 Datsun DW-2
  - 1951 Datsun DW-4
- 1950–1951 Datsun 4146 Pickup
- 1950–1954 Datsun DS series
  - 1950–1951 Datsun DS
  - 1951 Datsun DS-2
  - 1951–1952 Datsun DS-4
  - 1953 Datsun DS-5
  - 1954 Datsun DS-6 Convar
- 1950–1986 Datsun Patrol
- 1951–1953 Datsun 5147 Pickup
- 1952 Datsun DC-3
- 1953–1954 Datsun 6147 Pickup
- 1955–1957 Datsun 120 Pickup
- 1955–1986 Datsun Truck
- 1957–1961 Datsun 220 Pickup
- 1959–1970 Datsun Sports
- 1961–1965 Datsun 320 Pickup
- 1962–1970 Datsun 1500, 1600, 2000 Roadster
- 1962–1986 Datsun Bluebird
  - 1979–1986 Nissan Bluebird (910)
- 1965–1972 Datsun 520 Pickup
- 1965–1985 Datsun Sunny
  - 1965–1969 Datsun Sunny/1000/B10
  - 1971–1973 Datsun Sunny/1200/B110
  - 1974–1977 Datsun Sunny/120Y/B210
  - 1978–1982 Datsun Sunny/120Y/140Y/B310
  - 1982–1985 Datsun/Nissan Sunny/B11
- 1968–1973, 1978–1981 Datsun 510 Sedan
- 1970–1973 Datsun 240Z
- 1970–1974 Datsun 100A
- 1970–1976 Datsun 1200 Sedan
- 1970–1982 Datsun Cherry
- 1971–1975 Datsun 610
- 1971–1979 Datsun 240C
- 1971–1979 Datsun 260C
- 1972–1977 Datsun 200L
- 1973–1977 Datsun 140J
- 1973–1977 Datsun 710
- 1973–1979 Datsun 620 "Bulletside" pickup
- 1973–1979 Datsun 23J Special
- 1974 Datsun 260Z
- 1974–1978 Datsun F-10
- 1974–1983 Datsun B-210
- 1974–1983 Datsun 200SX
- 1975–1978 Datsun 280Z
- 1976–1978 Datsun 180B/180B SSS
- 1977–1981 Datsun 810
- 1977–1981 Datsun 200B/200B SSS
- 1978–1982 Datsun 210
- 1978–1982 Datsun 310
- 1978–1983 Datsun 280C
- 1973–1983 Datsun Urvan
- 1979–1983 Datsun 280ZX
- 1979–1984 Datsun 720 Pickup
- 2014–2020 Datsun on-Do
- 2014–2022 Datsun Go
- 2014–2022 Datsun Go+
- 2015–2020 Datsun mi-Do
- 2016–2022 Datsun redi-Go
- 2018–2020 Datsun Cross

== Former Nissan models ==
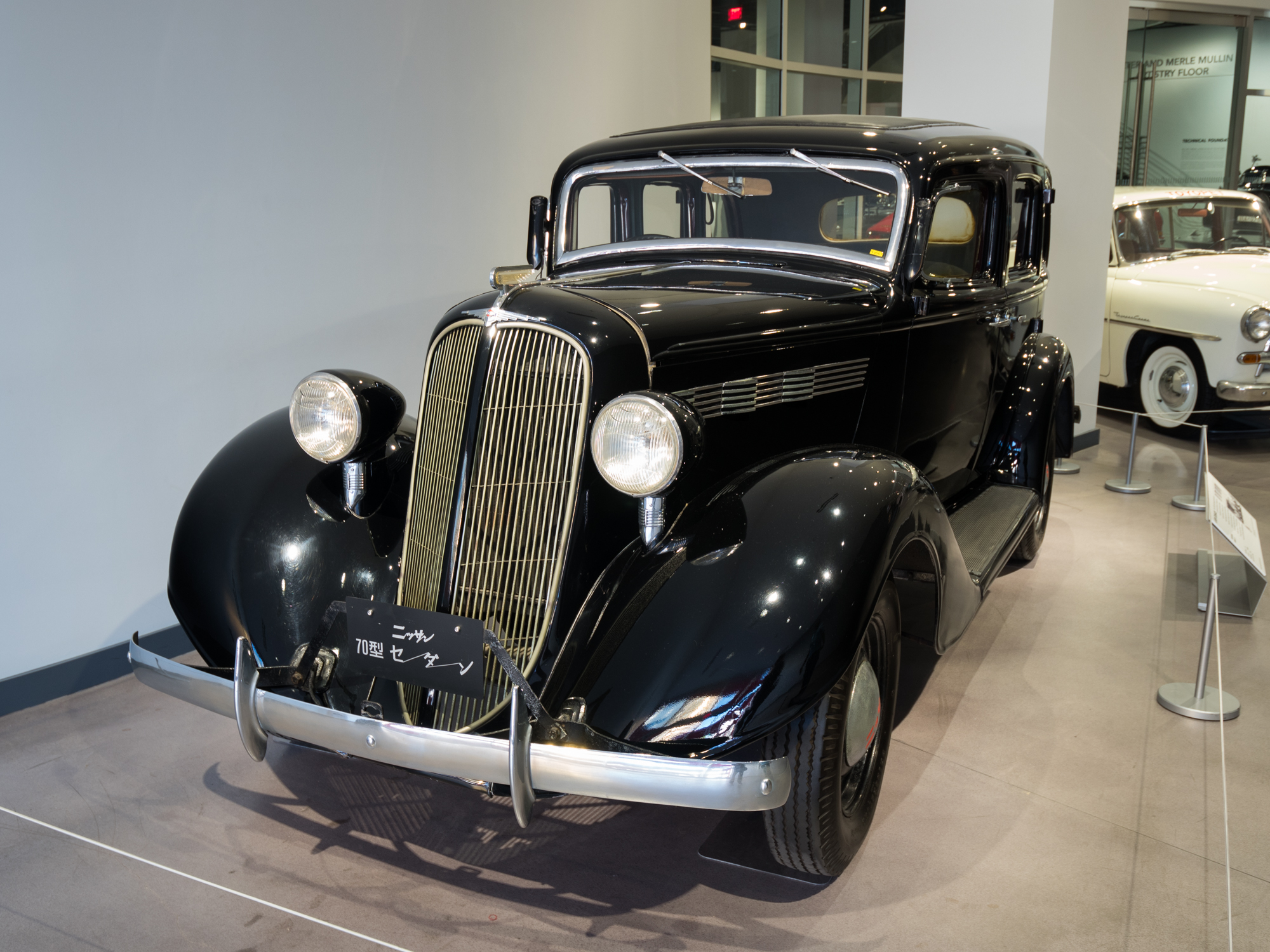
1938 Nissan Model 70 sedan

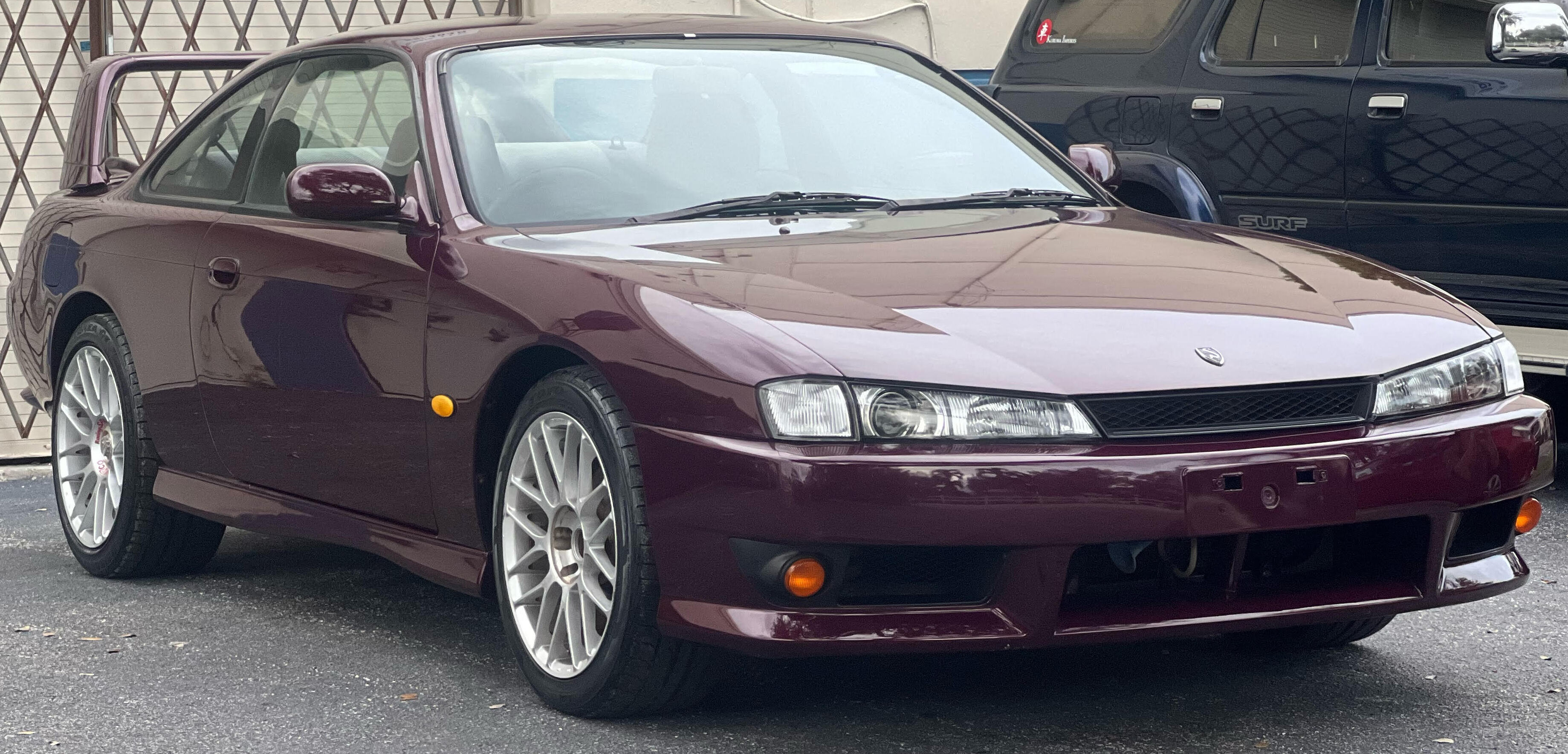
Nissan Silvia (S14)

- 1937–1943 Nissan Type 70 (based on the Graham Paige Crusader)
- 1937–1941 Nissan 80 Truck (based on the Graham Paige truck)
  - 1937–1941 Nissan 90 Bus
- 1939–1941 Nissan Type 50
- 1941 Nissan Type 30
- 1941 Nissan Type 53
- 1941–1952 Nissan 180 Truck (based on the 1937–1941 Chevrolet 133/158 trucks)
  - 1941–1949 Nissan 190 Bus
- 1949–1951 Nissan 290 Bus
- 1952–1953 Nissan 380 Truck
  - 1952–1953 Nissan 390 Bus
- 1953–1955 Nissan 480 Truck
  - 1955 Nissan 482 Truck
- 1953–1955 Nissan 490 Bus
  - 1955 Nissan 492 Bus
- 1955–1958 Nissan 580 Truck
  - 1958–1959 Nissan 582 Truck
- 1955–1958 Nissan 590 Bus
  - 1958–1959 Nissan 592 Bus
- 1956–1982 Nissan Junior Pickup
- 1957–1981 Nissan Caball
- 1957–2001 Nissan Bluebird
- 1958–1964 Nissan Cablight
- 1959–1970 Nissan U-R Bus
- 1959–1968 Nissan 680 Truck
  - 1959–1972 Nissan 690 Bus
- 1959–1970 Nissan Fairlady
- 1960–2004 Nissan Cedric/Gloria
- 1965–1968, 1974–2002 Nissan Silvia/180SX/200SX/240SX
- 1965–1997 Nissan Homy
- 1965–2010 Nissan President
  - 1986–1991 Nissan Sunny/B12
- 1965–2006 Nissan Sunny
- 1966–1967 Nissan Prince Royal
- 1966–1976 Nissan C80
- 1968 Nissan R380
- 1968–1969 Nissan 681 Truck
- 1968–1975 Nissan Cabstar
- 1968–2002, 2014 Nissan Laurel
- 1968–2002 Nissan Skyline GT-R
- 1969–1976 Nissan 780 Truck
- 1969 Nissan R381
- 1970 Nissan R382
- 1970 Nissan R383
- 1970–1986 Nissan Cherry
- 1971–2008 Nissan 1400
- 1971–2021 Nissan Civilian
- 1977–1992 Nissan Stanza
  - 1986–1988 Nissan Stanza Wagon
  - 1982–1986 Nissan Violet
- 1977–2002 Nissan 200SX (Silvia)
- 1978–2010 Nissan Vanette
  - 1987–1990 Nissan Vanette#Second generation
- 1979–1988 Nissan Gazelle
- 1980–1999 Nissan Leopard (also sold as the Infiniti J30)
- 1980–2023 Nissan Maxima
- 1982–2026 Nissan AD
- 1982–2004 Nissan Prairie
- 1984–1987 Nissan 300C
- 1984–1989 Nissan 300ZX Z31 (Fairlady Z in Japan)
- 1984–1989 Nissan Auster
- 1985 Nissan GTP ZX-Turbo
- 1985–1986 Nissan 720 Pickup
- 1986–1990 Nissan T12/T72
- 1986–1992 Nissan Pintara
- 1986.5–1997 Nissan Hardbody Truck
- 1986–2004 Nissan Trade
- 1986–2002 Nissan Terrano
- 1987–2015 Nissan Cedric Y31
- 1988 Nissan R88C
- 1988–1992 Nissan Ute (rebadged Ford XF Falcon)
- 1988–1998 Nissan Largo
- 1988–2003 Nissan Cefiro (also sold as the Infiniti I)
- 1988–2010, 2012–2022 Nissan Cima
- 1989 Nissan Be-1
- 1989 Nissan Pao
- 1989 Nissan R89C
- 1989–1992 Nissan S-Cargo
- 1989–1998 Nissan 180SX (branded as 200SX in Europe)
- 1989–1998 Nissan 240SX (JPN S13 and S14)
- 1990 Nissan Axxess
- 1990 Nissan NPT-90
- 1990 Nissan R90C
- 1990–1992 Nissan Presea R10
- 1990–1999 Nissan 300ZX Z32 (Fairlady Z in Japan)
- 1990–2003 Nissan Avenir (Expert)
- 1990–2008 Nissan Primera
- 1991 Nissan Figaro
- 1991 R91CP
- 1991 Nissan Saurus Jr.
- 1991–1996 Nissan NX
- 1991–1996 Nissan 100NX
- 1992 R92CP
- 1993–2002, 2004–2009, 2011–2016 Nissan Quest
- 1993–2006 Nissan Terrano II
- 1993–2009 Nissan Crew
- 1994–1996 Nissan Presea R11
- 1994–2000 Nissan Rasheen
- 1995–1998 Nissan 200SX (US 2-door Sentra coupe)
- 1996–2007 Nissan Stagea
- 1996–2018 Nissan Wingroad
- 1997–1998 Nissan R390 GT1
- 1997–2001 Nissan R'nessa
- 1997–2013 Nissan Atleon
- 1998–2006 Nissan Almera Tino
- 1998–2009 Nissan Presage
- 1998–2019 Nissan Cube
- 1999 Nissan R391
- 1999–2001 Nissan Hypermini
- 1999–2003 Nissan Bassara
- 1999–2015 Nissan Xterra
- 2002–2009 Nissan Platina (rebadged Renault Symbol)
- 2002–2016 Nissan Moco (rebadged Suzuki MR Wagon, a Keicar)
- 2003–2008 Nissan 350Z Z33 (Fairlady Z in Japan)
- 2003–2024 Nissan Titan
- 2003–2009 Nissan Kubistar (rebadged Renault Kangoo)
- 2004–2017 Nissan Lafesta (Only B35 rebadged Mazda Premacy/Mazda5)
- 2004–2022 Nissan Fuga
- 2004–2026 Nissan Tiida
- 2005–2013 Nissan Otti (rebadged Mitsubishi eK)
- 2007–2010 Nissan Aprio (rebadged Dacia Logan)
- 2007–2010 Nissan Pino (rebadged Suzuki Alto)
- 2007–2011 Nissan Clipper Rio (rebadged Mitsubishi Town Box)
- 2007–2015 Nissan Skyline Crossover
- 2007–2025 Nissan GT-R
- 2008–2012 Nissan Kix (rebadged Mitsubishi Pajero Mini)
- 2008–2024 Nissan NP200 (rebadged Dacia Logan Pick-Up)
- 2009–2013 Nissan Pixo (rebadged Suzuki Alto/Celerio)
- 2009–2020 Nissan 370Z
- 2010–2022 Nissan NV400 (rebadged Renault Master)
- 2011–2021 Nissan NV
- 2012–2022 Nissan Terrano (rebadged Dacia Duster)
- 2015–2022 Nissan Lannia
- 2018–2021 Nissan NV250 (rebadged Renault Kangoo)
