= Datsun sidevalve engine =

Datsun Type 7/10 engine
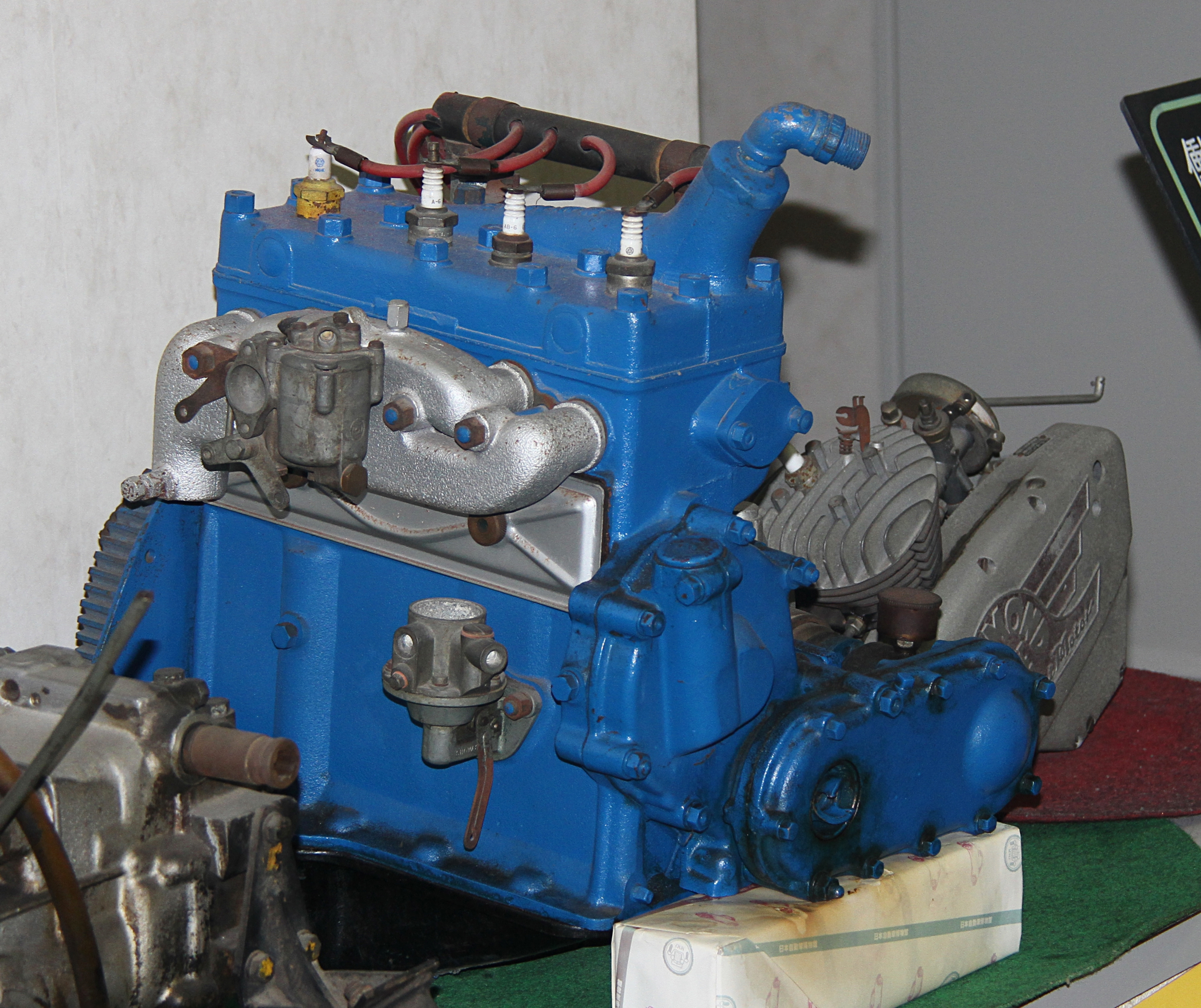
- Type 7 engine from a 1939 Datsun Type 17

Overview
- Manufacturer: DAT Automobile Manufacturing Co., Ltd.; Nissan Machinery

Layout
- Configuration: Naturally aspirated Inline-4
- Displacement: 0.5–0.9 L; 30.2–52.5 cu in (495–860 cc)
- Cylinder bore: 54 mm (2.13 in); 55 mm (2.17 in); 56 mm (2.20 in); 60 mm (2.36 in)
- Piston stroke: 54 mm (2.13 in); 76 mm (2.99 in)
- Valvetrain: Side valve
- Compression ratio: 8.0:1

Combustion
- Fuel system: Single Carburetor
- Fuel type: Petrol
- Cooling system: Water-cooled

Output
- Power output: 10–27 PS (7–20 kW)
- Torque output: 48 N⋅m (35 lb⋅ft) (Type 10)

Dimensions
- Dry weight: 137.5 kg (303 lb)

Chronology
- Successor: Nissan C engine OHV

Nissan's sidevalve engines were internal combustion automotive engines used in a variety of vehicles. They were based on the Austin 7 engine, with which they shared the 76 mm (2.99 in) stroke. The series began with a 495 cc iteration for the 1930 Datson Type 10 and ended with the 860 cc Type 10 engine that was used until 1964 for light commercial vehicles. Later versions were called the B-1. It was replaced in 1957 by the OHV Nissan C engine that was essentially a de-stroked version of another Austin design, the BMC B-Series.

== DAT 495 cc ==
The displacement of the original version was kept beneath a half litre, since driver's licenses were not required for such cars after a ministerial decision of 1930. The engine was a square design, with a bore and stroke of 54 mm × 54 mm (2.13 in × 2.13 in). Maximum power was 10 PS (7.4 kW) at 3700 rpm.

=== Applications ===
- 1930-1931 Datson Type 10
- 1932 Datsun Type 11

== DAT 747 cc ==
For 1933, the rule regarding drivers' licenses was changed so that cars of up to 750 cc could be driven without a license. Accordingly, Datsun enlarged their engine to displace 747 cc (0.7 L; 45.6 cu in) from a bore and stroke of 56 mm × 76 mm (2.20 in × 2.99 in). These dimensions are the same as those of the Austin 7. It produced 12 PS (9 kW) at 3000 rpm, later increased to 14 PS (10 kW).

=== Applications ===
- 1933-1934 Datsun Type 12
- 1934-1935 Datsun Type 13/13T

== Type 7 ==
This 722 cc (0.7 L; 44.1 cu in) engine is a flat-head side valve automobile engine, a supposedly new design that was slightly smaller but also slightly more powerful than the earlier DAT engine. Bore and stroke were nearly the same as for the earlier version, at 55 mm × 76 mm (2.17 in × 2.99 in). Power is 15 PS (11.0 kW); in 1936 the engine was upgraded to produce 16 PS (11.8 kW). Postwar cars again claimed 15 PS (11.0 kW), at 3600 rpm. In 1950, power was increased again to 20 PS (14.7 kW).

=== Applications ===
- 1935-1936 Datsun Type 14/14T
- 1936-1937 Datsun Type 15
- 1936-1938 Datsun Type 15T
- 1937-1938 Datsun Type 16
- 1938 Datsun Type 17
- 1938 Datsun Type 17T
- 1946 Datsun 1121
- 1947-1949 Datsun 2124
- 1947-1948 Datsun DA
- 1949 Datsun 3135
- 1949-1950 Datsun DB-2/DW-2
- 1950 Datsun DS
- 1950-1951 Datsun 4146 Truck
- 1951-1952 Datsun DS-2 Thrift
- 1951-1953 Datsun DB-4/DW-4/DV-4
- 1951-1953 Datsun 5147 Truck
- 1952-1953 Datsun DS-4 Thrift

== Type 10 ==
The Datsun Type 10 engine was a 860 cc (0.9 L; 52.5 cu in) engine flat-head side valve automobile engine produced from 1952 through 1964. Bore and stroke were 60 mm × 76 mm (2.36 in × 2.99 in) in the undersquare British style. Later on, the engine's name was shortened to D-10.

Its original output was 20 PS (14.7 kW) for the DC-3, but this increased to 25 PS (18.4 kW) at 4000 rpm and 5.1 kg⋅m (50 N⋅m; 37 lb⋅ft) at 2400 rpm in 1953 thanks to an increased compression ratio of 6.5:1. The engine used a single carburetor. This engine was called the B-1 when installed in the 1958-1964 Datsun Cabstar; this version produces 27 PS (19.9 kW) at 5200 rpm.

=== Applications ===
- 1952 Datsun DC-3
- 1953–1954 Datsun 6147 Truck
- 1953–1954 Datsun DB-5/DV-5
- 1953–1954 Datsun DS-5 Thrift
- 1954 Datsun DB-6
- 1954 Datsun DS-6 Convar
- 1955 Datsun 110
- 1955 Datsun 120
- 1956 Datsun 112
- 1956 Datsun 122
- 1956–1957 Datsun 113
- 1956-1957 Datsun 123
- 1957-1958 Datsun 124 Truck
- 1958 Datsun 114
- 1958–1959 Datsun 115
- 1958-1961 Datsun Cabstar A20 (B-1)
- 1959-1960 Datsun 125 Truck (B-1)
- 1960- Datsun 126 Truck (B-1)
- 1961-1964 Datsun Cabstar A120 & A121 (B-1)

== See also ==
- List of Nissan engines
