= Datsun Type 13 =

Overview
- Manufacturer: Datsun/Nissan
- Production: 1934–1935; 880 produced
- Assembly: Yanase Motor/Nihon Jidosha Corp. (body); Tobata Casting (chassis)

Body and chassis
- Body style: phaeton, roadster, sedan, van, truck
- Layout: FR layout

Powertrain
- Engine: 747 cc DAT SV I4
- Transmission: 3-speed manual

Dimensions
- Length: 2,710 mm (106.7 in)
- Width: 1,175 mm (46.3 in)
- Height: 1,880 mm (74.0 in)
- Curb weight: 400 kg (882 lb)

Chronology
- Predecessor: Datsun Type 12
- Successor: Datsun Type 14

The Datsun Type 13 was a small car produced by Nissan Motor Co., Ltd. Introduced in July 1934, it remained in production until March 1935 after its replacement, the Type 14, was introduced in February 1935. The Type 13 was basically similar to the earlier 1933 Type 12, but was more stylish in appearance. For the first time, a truck version was also available; the Datsun Type 13T.

== Design ==
The fully chromed, heart-shaped grille was entirely new and tilted backwards by about ten degrees, unlike the upright design used on earlier Datsuns. The vents on the sides of the bonnet were installed at the same angle as the grille and the earlier cast spoked wheels were replaced with flush, pressed steel items. Aside from the truck and a panel van, there was also a range of two-door passenger car bodies available: a Phaeton, a roadster, and a sedan with suicide doors.

Popular as a taxi in Japan, the Type 13 was the first Datsun to be exported, with 44 cars sent mainly to South Africa and Australia. Some cars were sold directly from a ship, touring the world and promoting Japanese-made goods. An attempt to clothe Type 13 bodies with locally made Australian bodywork ended in bankruptcy after a succession of logistical and engineering failures. 880 Type 13s were built in 1934 alone; the total production overall is uncertain.

== Production ==
As with the Type 12, the chassis was built by Tobata Casting's Automotive Division in Osaka. Tobata Castings merged with the Nihon Sangyo Co. ("Japan Industries") in December 1933. Nihon Sangyo was abbreviated "Ni-San" in the Tokyo stock exchange. After the merger, the new company traded as Jidosha Seizo ("Automobile Manufacturing"), but in 1934 it was decided to use the stock market abbreviation for the new company and Nissan was formed. The car retained the 12 PS (8.8 kW) 747 cc engine as used on the Type 12, coupled to the same three-speed manual gearbox.

The Type 13 was the last Datsun to be built mainly by subcontractors, before proper integrated series production began in 1935. There are thus large variations in the bodywork and details of any remaining Type 13s.
