= Nissan 300 =

Nissan 300 is a badge applied to different Nissan models available with a 3.0 L V6 engine:

- Nissan 300C, a luxury car produced from 1984 to 1987
- Nissan 300ZX, a sports car of the Z-car series produced from 1983 to 2000

== See also ==
- List of Nissan vehicles
