= Datsun DA =

Overview
- Manufacturer: Nissan
- Production: 1947–1950
- Assembly: Japan: Yokohama

Body and chassis
- Body style: 2-door sedan
- Layout: FR layout
- Related: Datsun 1121 truck

Powertrain
- Engine: 722 cc Type 7 SV I4
- Transmission: 3-speed manual

Dimensions
- Wheelbase: 2,006 mm (79.0 in)
- Length: 3,150 mm (124.0 in)
- Width: 1,330 mm (52.4 in)
- Height: 1,570 mm (61.8 in)
- Curb weight: 520 kg (1,146 lb)

Chronology
- Predecessor: Datsun Type 17
- Successor: Datsun DS series

The Datsun DA was a small automobile produced by Nissan and sold under the Datsun brand as Nissan's first post-war passenger car. The DA was introduced in November 1947, a direct result of the occupying Allied command once again allowing production of passenger cars. As the tooling for the pre-war Datsun Type 17 was no longer available, the DA was based on the Datsun 1121 truck (which itself was based on the pre-war 17T truck); it used the 722 cc Type 7 side valve engine from the 17T as well as its floor-shifted 3-speed manual transmission and front clip, including a pressed steel grille and nearly no brightwork.

Datsun also offered the Deluxe Sedan (DB) with more modern ponton bodywork alongside the lower cost DA Standard Sedan. The DA had a simple pressed metal grille when first introduced; by 1949 this had been replaced by a more ornate chromed unit. The DA also received a redesigned, less boxy rear section in 1948. The DA was in production until 1950 when it was replaced by the Datsun DS Series (later also marketed as the "Thrift").
