= Datsun 17T =

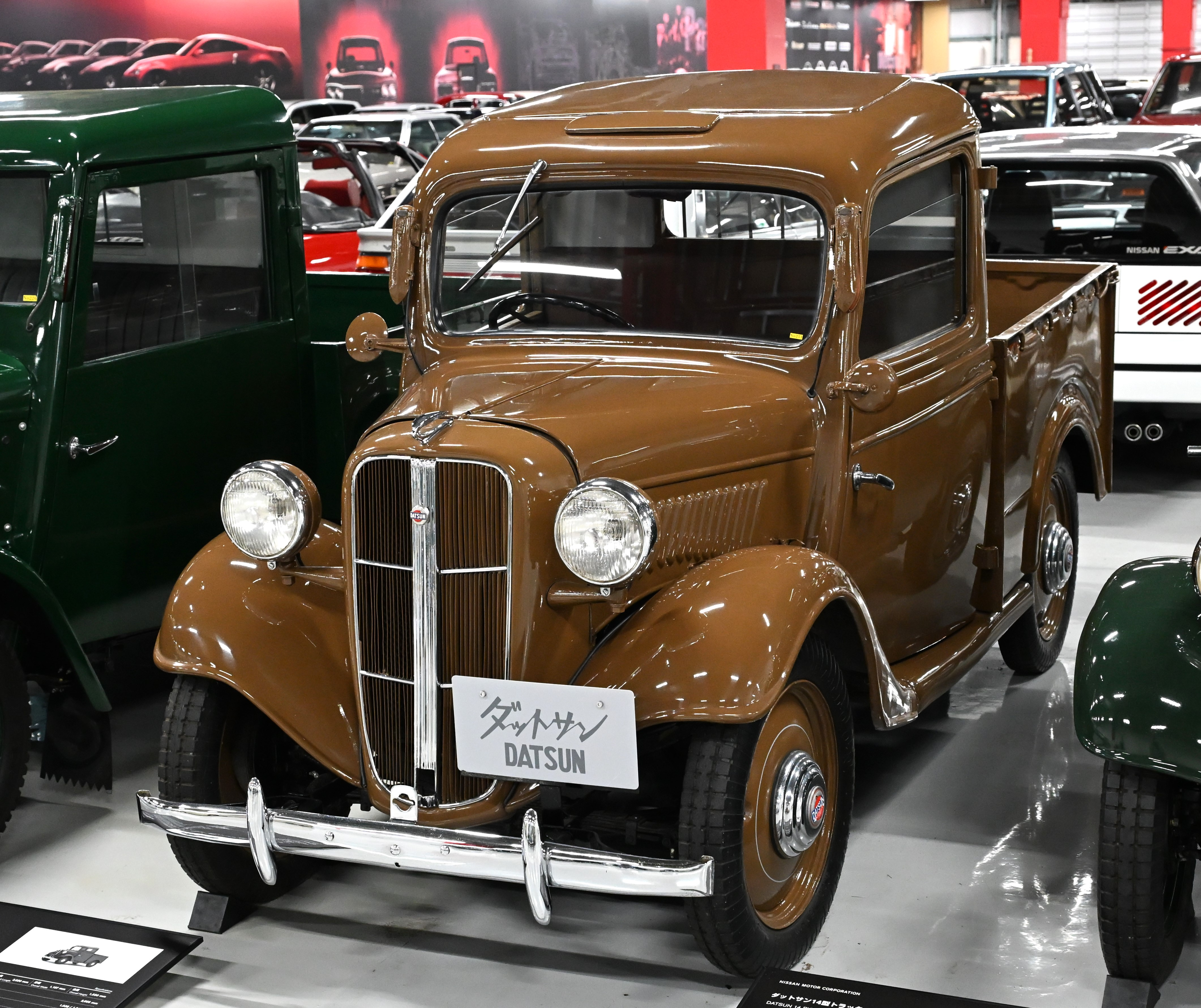
- Datsun 17T

Overview
- Manufacturer: Datsun/Nissan
- Production: 1938–1944
- Assembly: Japan: Yokohama

Body and chassis
- Body style: Truck
- Layout: FR layout

Powertrain
- Engine: 722 cc (44.1 cu in) Type 7 I4
- Transmission: 3 speed manual

Dimensions
- Wheelbase: 2,005 mm (78.9 in)
- Length: 3,187 mm (125.5 in)
- Width: 1,190 mm (46.9 in)

Chronology
- Predecessor: Datsun 15T
- Successor: Datsun 1121

The Datsun 17T was a small truck produced in Japan from 1938 until 1944. It was also used by the Japanese armed forces in the Second Sino-Japanese War and in World War II.

== Design ==
The Datsun 17T was almost identical to the preceding Datsun 15T but distinguished by a wider vertical bar in middle of the front grille.

== Drivetrain ==
The Datsun 17T was mechanically identical to the Datsun 17 with a 16 PS (12 kW) engine drove the rear wheels through a 3-speed gearbox to give the car a top speed of 80 km/h (50 mph).

== Production ==
The Datsun 17T was produced in Yokohama from April 1938 to January 1944 and then resumed after the Second World War in 1949 with a different grille as the Datsun 3135 and with an almost identical grille in 1950 as the Datsun 4146.
