= Datsun DB series =

Overview
- Manufacturer: Nissan
- Also called: Datsun Deluxe
- Production: 1948-1954

Body and chassis
- Layout: FR layout
- Related: Datsun DS series

Chronology
- Successor: Datsun 110

The Datsun DB series was introduced in 1948 as a more modern, ponton-bodied complement to the Datsun DA. It was based on pre-war Datsun designs, themselves closely based on the Austin Seven. A lower-cost range with the same underpinnings, called the DS series, took over from the DA and was sold in parallel. The cars shared their chassis with the contemporary small Datsun trucks, which sold in considerably larger numbers.

== Datsun DB ==
Datsun DB

Overview
- Production: 1948-1949

Body and chassis
- Body style: 2-door sedan
- Layout: FR layout
- Related: Datsun 2124 Pickup

Powertrain
- Engine: 722 cc Type 7 SV I4
- Transmission: 3-speed manual

Dimensions
- Wheelbase: 2,005 mm (78.9 in)
- Length: 3,150 mm (124.0 in)
- Width: 1,330 mm (52.4 in)
- Height: 1,570 mm (61.8 in)
- Curb weight: 520 kg (1,146 lb)

Chronology
- Successor: Datsun DB-2

The Datsun DB was introduced in March 1948 as the first postwar Japanese vehicle with modern styling. After a trial production period, series production commenced in August 1948. The DB (based on the same pre-war chassis as used on the Datsun 2124 truck and most other Datsuns since the early 1930s) resembled the 1947 Crosley, with some minor differences: the front end was longer, windshield shape was rectangular, grille design was different. The engine was the pre-war 722 cc Type 7 sidevalve four-cylinder (rated at 15 horsepower) with a floor-shift 3-speed manual. The DB was in production until 1949, when it was replaced by the Datsun DB-2.

== Datsun DB-2 ==
Datsun DB-2

Overview
- Production: 1949-1951

Body and chassis
- Body style: 2-door sedan; 2-door station wagon
- Layout: FR layout

Powertrain
- Engine: 722 cc Type 7 SV I4
- Transmission: 3-speed manual

Dimensions
- Wheelbase: 2,005 mm (78.9 in)

Chronology
- Predecessor: Datsun DB
- Successor: Datsun DB-4

The Datsun DB-2 was introduced in 1949 and was redesigned to look less like the 1947 Crosley; the dorsal fin that ran down the hood and front end was removed and replaced by a crease and the front end was almost completely flat. The grille became a single piece (it was changed in 1950), above the grille was where the license plate attached. The engine and transmission were carried over from the DB. A station wagon version called the DW-2 was also available; it was Nissan's first and only "woody" wagon. The DB-2 was in production until 1951, when it was replaced by the four door Datsun DB-4.

== Datsun DB-4 ==
Datsun DB-4
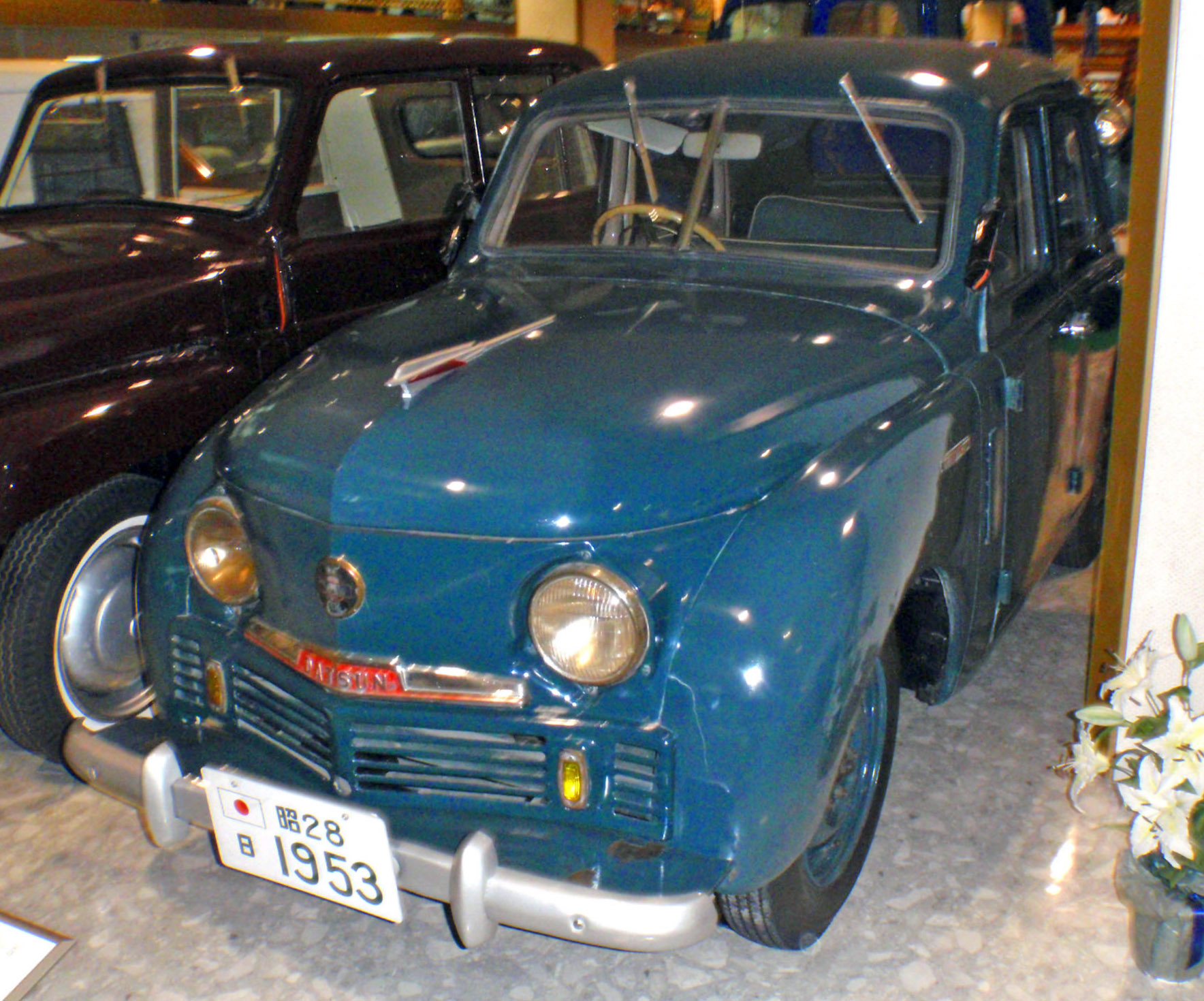

Overview
- Production: 1951-1953

Body and chassis
- Body style: 4-door sedan; 4-door station wagon; 3-door van
- Layout: FR layout

Powertrain
- Engine: 722 cc Type 7 SV I4
- Transmission: 3-speed manual

Dimensions
- Wheelbase: 2,150 mm (84.6 in)
- Length: 3,850 mm (151.6 in)
- Width: 1,480 mm (58.3 in)
- Height: 1,560 mm (61.4 in)
- Curb weight: 890 kg (1,962 lb)

Chronology
- Predecessor: Datsun DB-2
- Successor: Datsun DB-5

In 1951, the four-door Datsun DB-4 was introduced (the DB-3 designation was skipped, but this designation may or may not have anything to do with the number of doors, as the later DB-5 and DB-6 also have four doors). The DB-4 was based on a lengthened DB-2 chassis to allow room for the new body. The front end remained the same, but everything from the firewall back was all new. The windshield now had curved edges instead of the straight edged class on the DB-2. The front end was changed; the chrome-plated grille was replaced with a pressed steel unit that was painted the same color as rest of the car; it also featured a pair of turn signals. Above the grille was a wide red and chrome badge with the Datsun name in the middle; above this was a round badge. The engine and transmission were carried over from the DB-2. Like the DB-2, a station wagon version (called DW-4) was available, but this one did not have wooden panels. A three-door van called the DV-4 (with or without side windows) was also available. The DB-4 was in production until January 1953, when it was replaced by the Datsun DB-5.

== Datsun DB-5 ==
Datsun DB-5

Overview
- Production: 1953-1954

Body and chassis
- Body style: 4-door sedan
- Layout: FR layout

Powertrain
- Engine: 860 cc D10 SV I4
- Transmission: 3-speed manual

Dimensions
- Wheelbase: 2,150 mm (84.6 in)
- Length: 3,805 mm (149.8 in)
- Width: 1,480 mm (58.3 in)
- Height: 1,560 mm (61.4 in)
- Curb weight: 890 kg (1,962 lb)

Chronology
- Predecessor: Datsun DB-4
- Successor: Datsun DB-6

The Datsun DB-5 was introduced in February 1953. The DB-5's body remained the same except for intakes added (with two chrome horizontal bars) between the headlights. The engine was the new 860 cc Datsun D10 side valve four-cylinder (essentially a stroked version of the Type 7 engine), producing 25 horsepower. The DB-5 was slightly redesigned in late 1953; the side indicators were changed and it now had a larger, wrap-around rear window with the glass cast in three pieces. The DV-5 Light Van (a commercial vehicle with side windows) received the same updates in 1954 as did the DB-5, with the layout of the side windows changed rather than getting a new rear wind screen. On the original design there were two equally spaced rear side windows, while on the facelift model the C-pillar migrated backwards so as to not obstruct the view from the (folding) rear seat. The DB-5 was produced until June 1954, when it was replaced by the Datsun DB-6.

== Datsun DB-6 ==
Datsun DB-6

Overview
- Production: 1954.07 - 1954.12

Body and chassis
- Body style: 4-door sedan
- Layout: FR layout

Powertrain
- Engine: 860 cc D10 SV I4
- Transmission: 4-speed manual

Dimensions
- Wheelbase: 2,150 mm (84.6 in)
- Length: 3,805 mm (149.8 in)
- Width: 1,480 mm (58.3 in)
- Height: 1,560 mm (61.4 in)
- Curb weight: 890 kg (1,962 lb)

Chronology
- Predecessor: Datsun DB-5

The Datsun DB-6 was introduced in July 1954 as the final model in the DB series. The DB-6's body was carried over from the DB-5, as well as the D10 engine. The only change to the DB-6 was a 4-speed manual transmission. There was no direct replacement for the DB series; Nissan marketed the Nissan-built Austin A40 Somerset and A50 Cambridge as their upmarket cars until 1960, when the Nissan Cedric was released.
