= Datsun Type 14 =

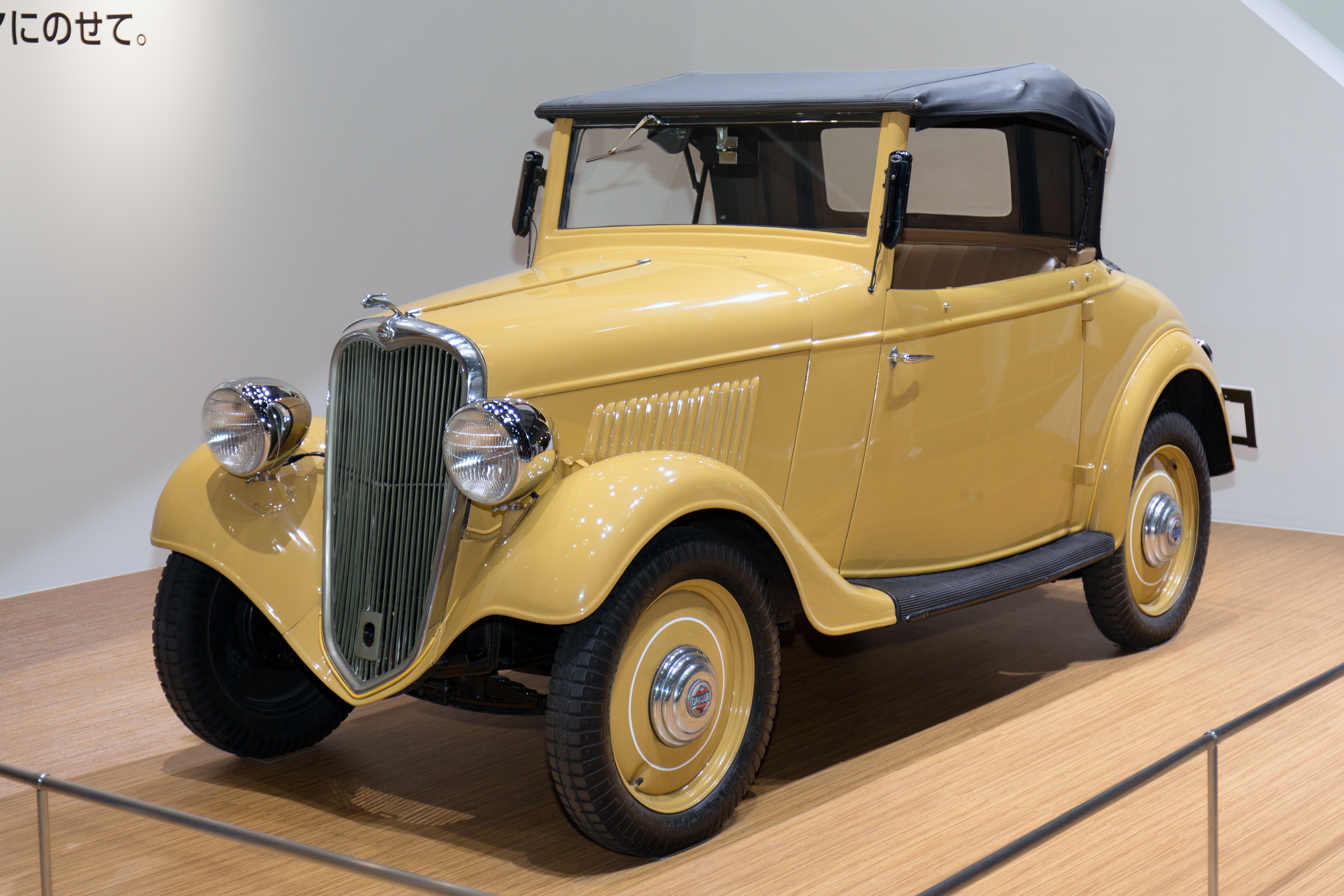
- 1935 Datsun 14 roadster

Overview
- Manufacturer: Datsun/Nissan
- Production: 1935–1936; 3,800 produced
- Assembly: Japan: Yokohama
- Designer: Noriyoshi Gotoh

Body and chassis
- Body style: phaeton, roadster, sedan, van
- Layout: FR layout

Powertrain
- Engine: 722 cc Type 7 side-valve I4
- Transmission: 3 speed manual

Dimensions
- Wheelbase: 1,980 mm (78.0 in)
- Length: 2,800 mm (110.2 in)
- Width: 1,200 mm (47.2 in)
- Height: 1,600 mm (63.0 in)

Chronology
- Predecessor: Datsun Type 13
- Successor: Datsun Type 15

The Datsun Type 14 was a small car produced by Japanese manufacturer Nissan Motor Co., Ltd. from February 1935 to 1936. It had a 15 PS (11 kW) sidevalve engine and was offered in several body styles. According to Britain's National Motor Museum at Beaulieu, the Type 14 "marked the birth of the Japanese car industry."

== Design ==
The Datsun 14 was externally very similar to the preceding Datsun Type 13. The only notable difference was the addition of a leaping rabbit emblem. The brand Datsun is derived from the DAT car of 1914. The car's name was an acronym of the surnames of the following partners of Kaishinsha Motor Car Works (快進社自働車工場, Kaishinsha jidōsha kōjō), the company that produced it:

- Kenjirō Den (田 健次郎, Den Kenjirō)
- Rokurō Aoyama (青山 禄朗, Aoyama Rokurō)
- Meitarō Takeuchi (竹内 明太郎, Takeuchi Meitarō).

Fortuitously, Dat (脱兎) also means to "dash off like a startled rabbit or hare". Nissan decided to use this association to incorporate a rabbit into the design of the Datsun Type 14 and therefore Ryuichi Tomiya designed the leaping rabbit radiator mascot which became a defining characteristic of the type.

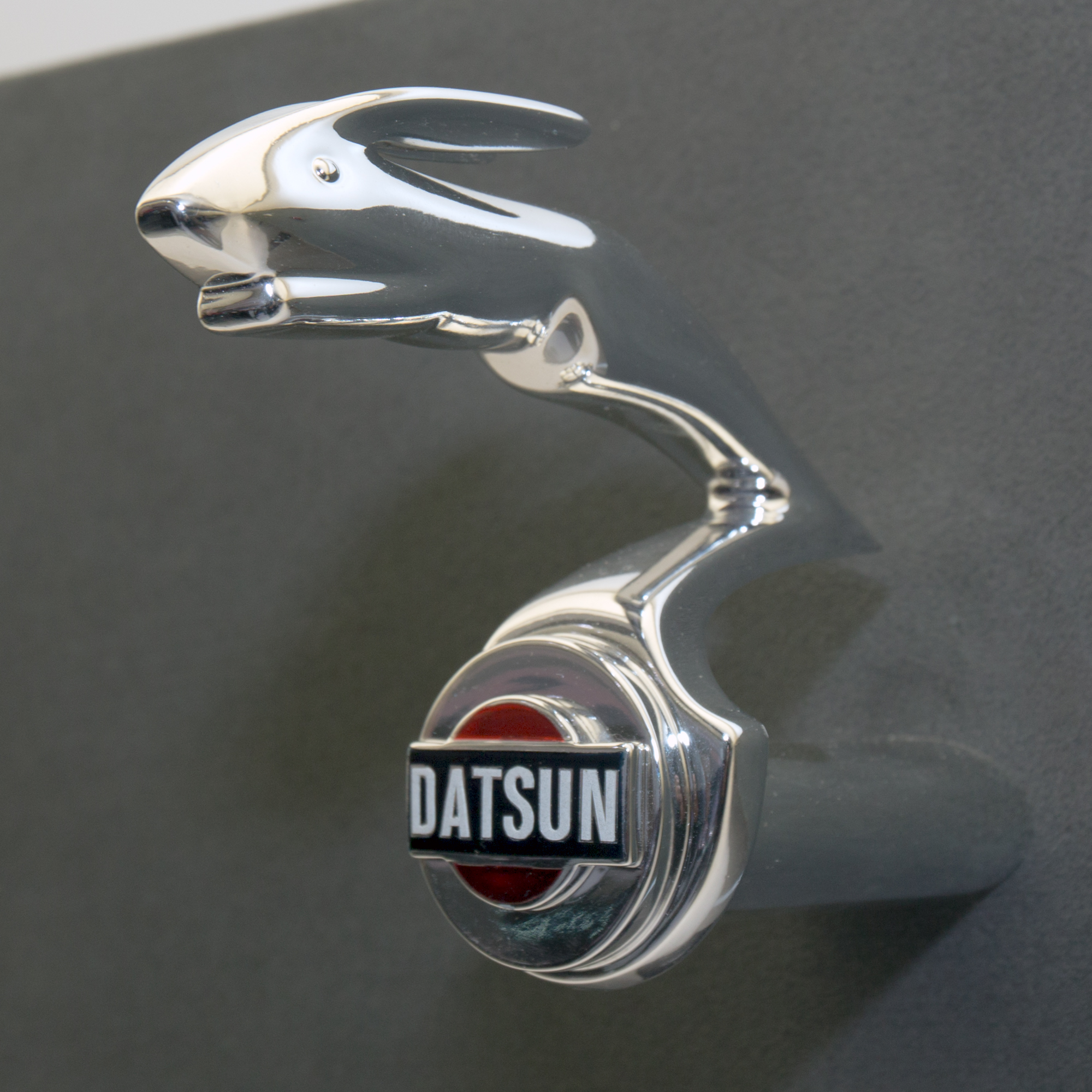
The leaping rabbit emblem on a 1935 Datsun 14

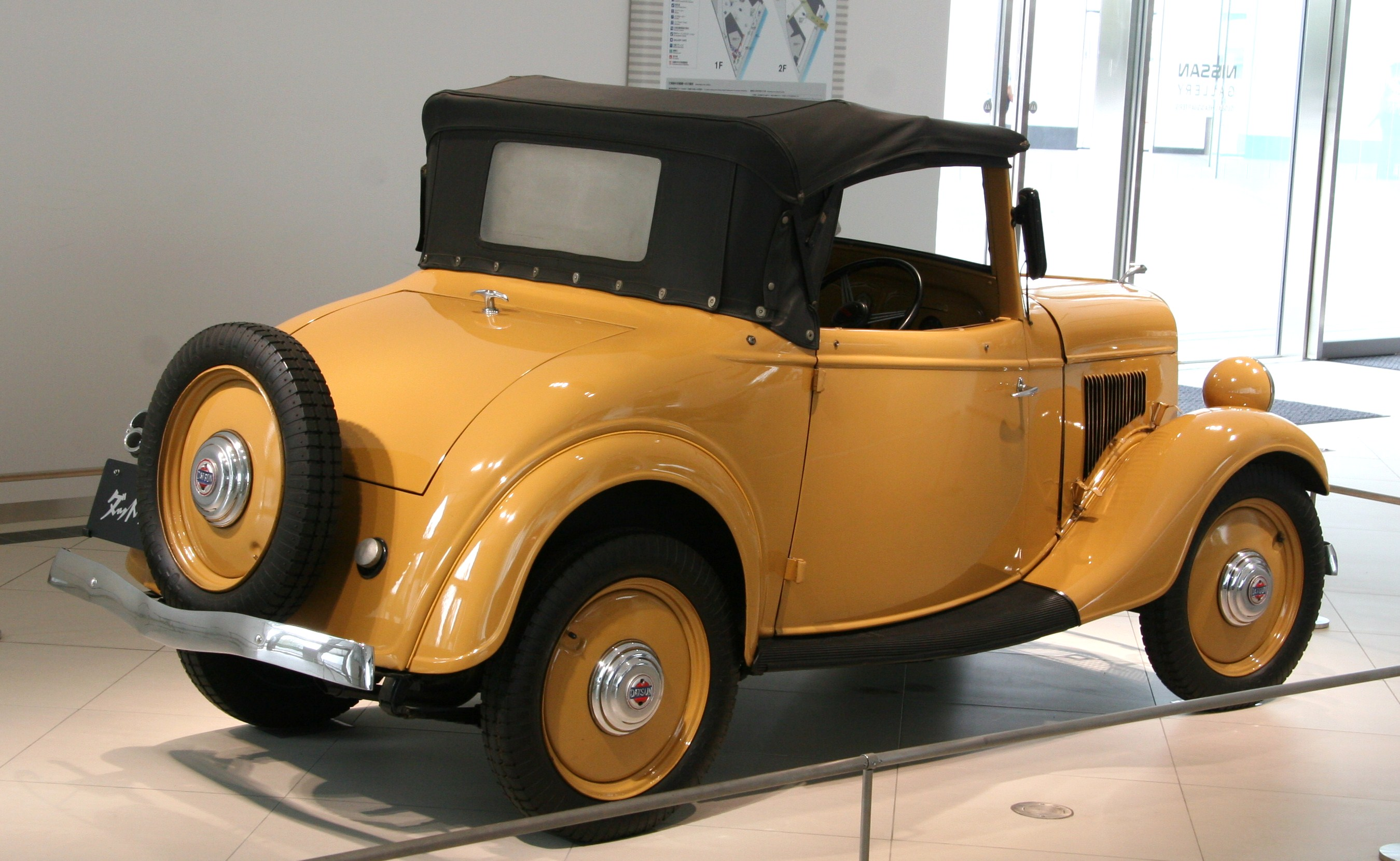
1935 Datsun 14 roadster at 2013 Tokyo Motor Show

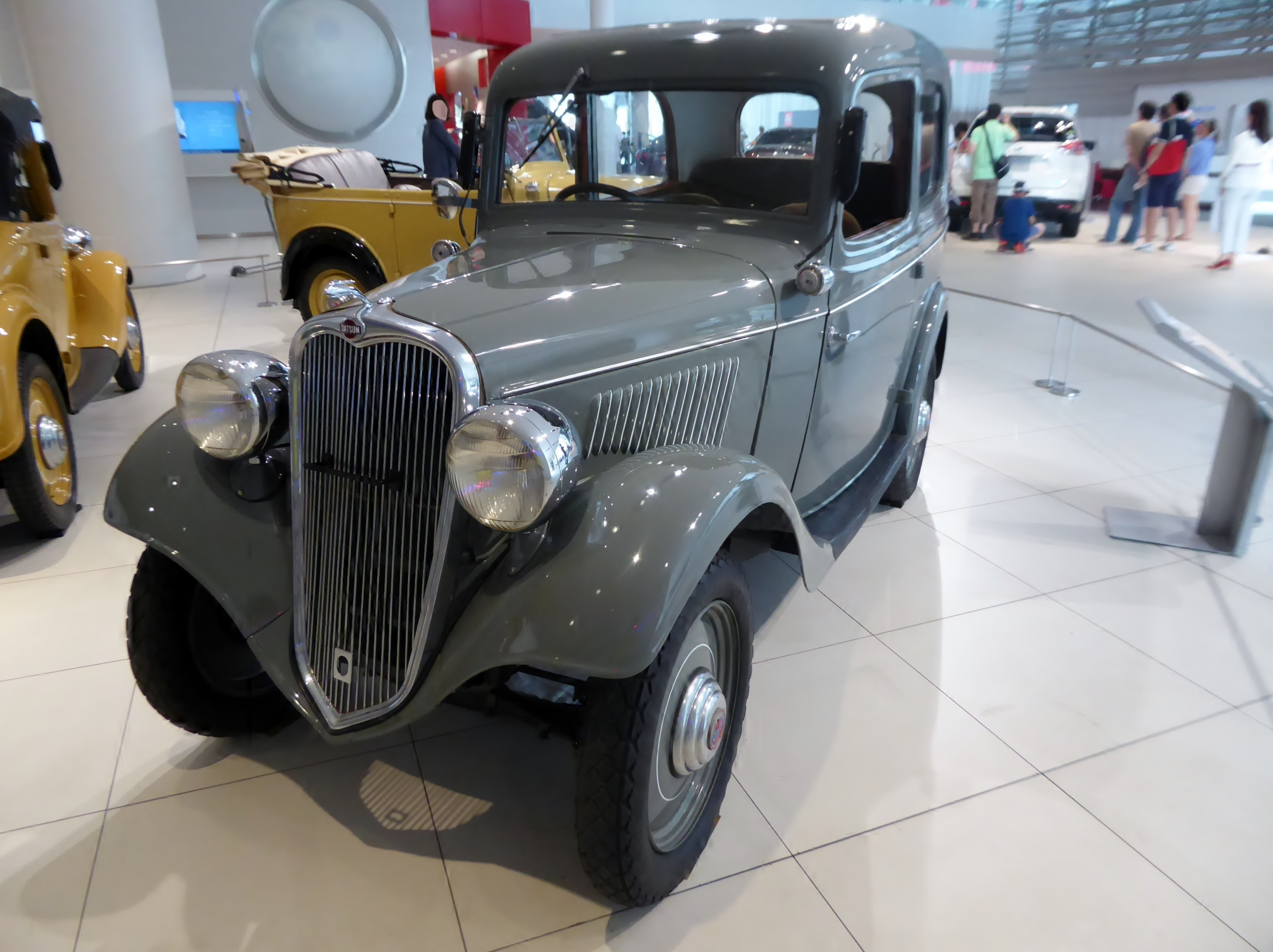
1935 Datsun 14 sedan in 2016

Mechanically, the old DAT engine of the Datsun Type 13 was replaced with the new Datsun Type 7 engine, a side valve four-cylinder engine with a displacement of 722 cc (44.1 cu in). The new engine was smaller, but more powerful, at 15 hp (11 kW). The engine drove the rear wheels through a three-speed gearbox to give the car a top speed of 80 km/h (50 mph).

== Production ==
The Datsun 14 was the first car that Nissan produced at their new plant in Yokohama. The factory utilised many tools and techniques imported from the United States and enabled the company to assemble both bodies and chassis in the same factory for the first time. The first vehicle rolled off the production line on 12 April 1935.

== Production numbers ==
A total of 3,800 Datsun 14 were produced between April 1935 and April 1936, of which 53 were exported. The car was similar in styling to the Austin 7, which greatly helped exports, initially to Australia and, in 1936, to New Zealand.

== Datsun 14T ==
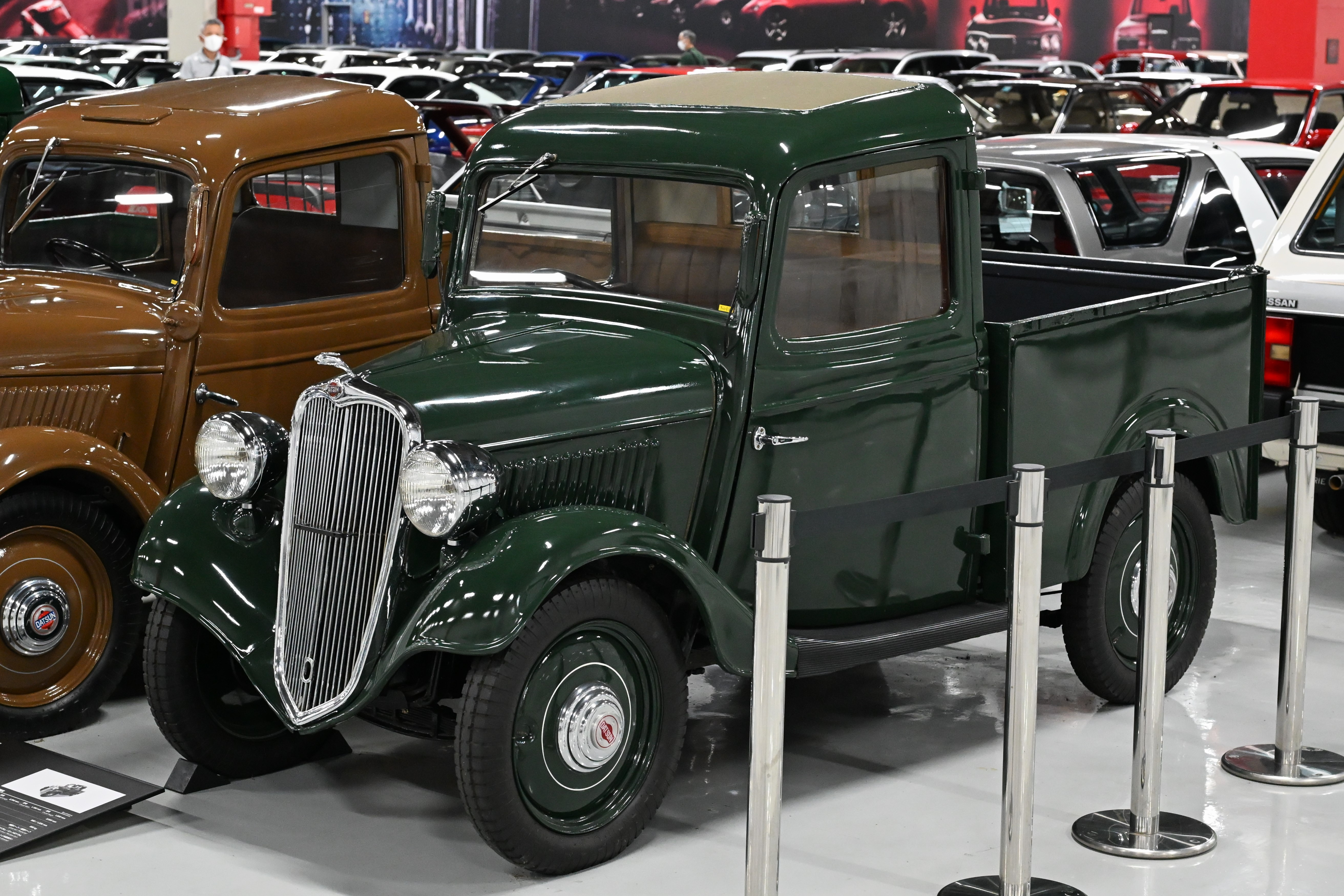
1935 Datsun 14T

Nissan produced the Datsun 14T commercial vehicle based on the Datsun 14 at the same factory during the same period. The truck had a front section identical to the 14, including the rabbit radiator mascot and chrome plated grille.
