= Datsun DS series =

Overview
- Manufacturer: Nissan; Suminoe Seisakusho
- Also called: Datsun Thrift (DS-2/DS-4/DS-5); Datsun Convar (DS-6)
- Production: 1950–1954
- Assembly: Japan: Yokohama

Body and chassis
- Layout: FR layout
- Related: Datsun DB series

Chronology
- Predecessor: Datsun DA
- Successor: Datsun 110

The Datsun DS series was introduced in 1950 as the replacement for the Datsun DA. It used Datsun's truck chassis, itself based on pre-war Datsun designs closely based on the Austin Seven. A more luxurious range with the same truck underpinnings, called the DB series, was sold in parallel. With Datsun's own manufacturing resources being limited, they built the chassis and outsourced the manufacture of the bodies: the sparser "Thrift" (DS) series received bodies built by Suminoe Manufacturing, while the ponton-bodied Deluxe models were bodied by Central Japan Heavy-Industries' Ryowa Body subsidiary (this company later became Shin-Mitsubishi Heavy Industries).

== Datsun DS ==
Datsun DS

Overview
- Production: 1950

Body and chassis
- Body style: 2-door sedan
- Related: Datsun 4146 Pickup

Powertrain
- Engine: 722 cc Type 7 SV I4
- Transmission: 3-speed manual

Dimensions
- Wheelbase: 2,005 mm (78.9 in)
- Length: 3,185 mm (125.4 in)
- Width: 1,380 mm (54.3 in)

The Datsun DS (Datsun DS-1) was introduced in late 1949 or 1950 as the replacement for the Datsun DA. It was essentially a 4146 truck, but with more comfortable bodywork and a chrome grille similar to that of the Datsun 17T truck except the center strip was chromed instead of painted. The same engine was used, but was modified to produce 20 PS (15 kW). The DS was short-lived as the last one was produced in early 1951.

== Datsun DS-2 ==
Datsun DS-2
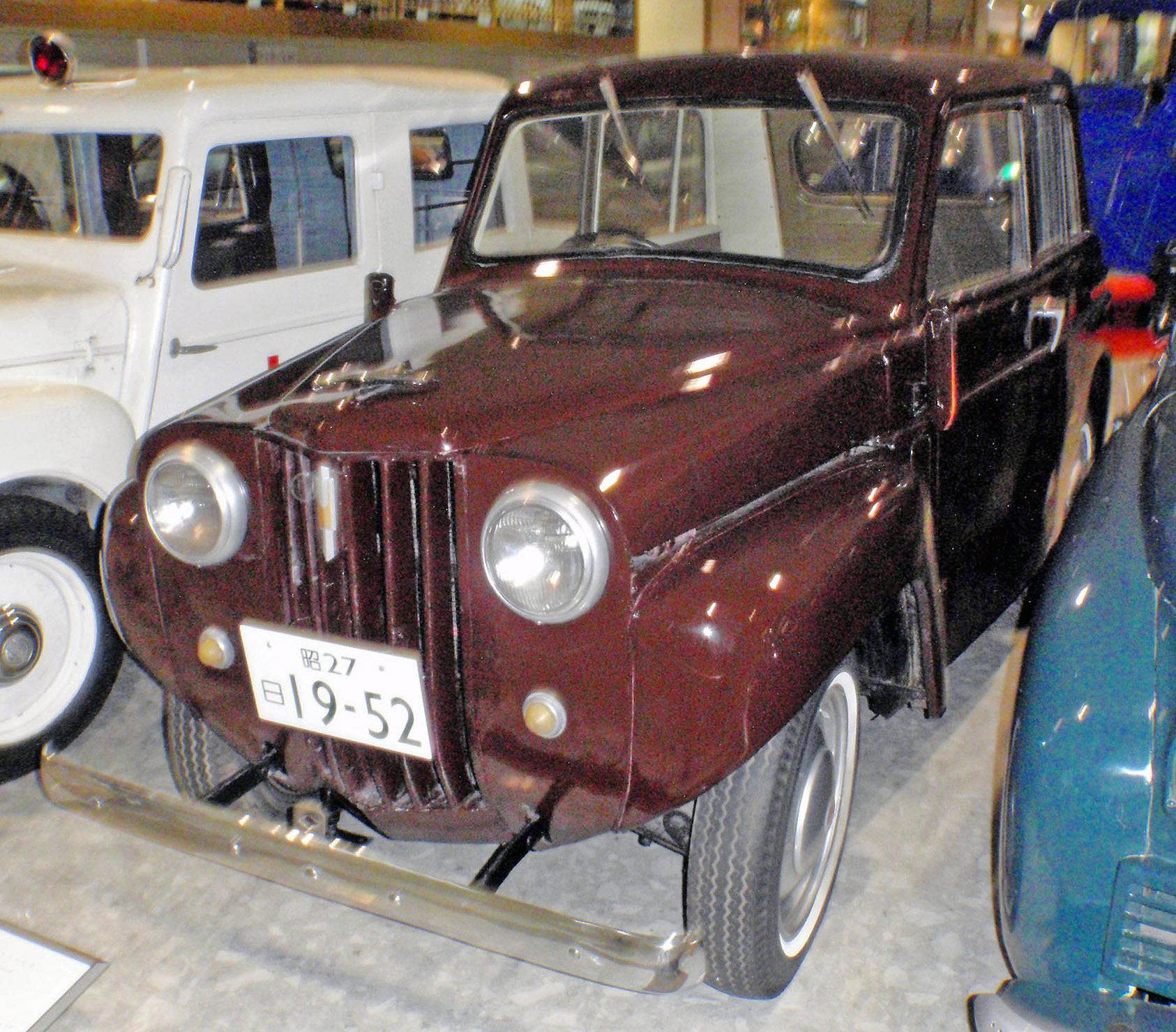

Overview
- Production: 1951–1952

Body and chassis
- Body style: 2-door sedan
- Related: Datsun DB-2; Datsun 5147 Pickup

Powertrain
- Engine: 722 cc Type 7 SV I4
- Transmission: 3-speed manual

Dimensions
- Wheelbase: 2,005 mm (78.9 in)
- Length: 3,500 mm (137.8 in)
- Width: 1,400 mm (55.1 in)
- Height: 1,550 mm (61.0 in)
- Curb weight: 770 kg (1,698 lb)

The Datsun DS-2 was released in 1951 and was completely redesigned with modern styling (the front end resembled a scaled-down Willys Jeep). The DS-2 was based on the Datsun 5147 truck and the drivetrain was the same new 860 cc engine as used in the DB-2. The DS-2 and later DS models were marketed as a less expensive (and basic) alternative to the more upscale DB. The DS-2 was known in Japan as the "Square Dandy" thanks to its square and boxy Jeeplike styling; the DS-2 was replaced by the Datsun DS-4 in 1952.

== Datsun DS-4 ==
Datsun DS-4

Overview
- Production: 1952–1953

Body and chassis
- Body style: 4-door sedan

Powertrain
- Engine: 722 cc Type 7 SV I4
- Transmission: 3-speed manual

Dimensions
- Wheelbase: 2,150 mm (84.6 in)
- Length: 3,750 mm (147.6 in)
- Width: 1,458 mm (57.4 in)
- Height: 1,535 mm (60.4 in)
- Curb weight: 930 kg (2,050 lb)

The Datsun DS-4 (the DS-3 designation was skipped) was released in 1952 and was the first four-door car (along with the DB-4) to have the Datsun name. The styling was a nightmare (it looked like five different cars put together). The drivetrain carried over from the DS-2, although the chassis was lengthened to enable a larger passenger compartment. The front doors were rear-hinged while the rear doors were front-hinged. The front end was similar to the DS-2 but with a different grille; the front of the hood spelled out "DATSUN" in individual chrome letters. The DS-4 was in production until late 1953, when it was replaced by the Datsun DS-5.

== Datsun DS-5 ==
Datsun DS-5

Overview
- Production: 1953–1954

Body and chassis
- Body style: 4-door sedan

Powertrain
- Engine: 860 cc Type 10 SV I4
- Transmission: 3-speed manual

Dimensions
- Wheelbase: 2,150 mm (84.6 in)
- Length: 3,815 mm (150.2 in)
- Width: 1,458 mm (57.4 in)
- Height: 1,545 mm (60.8 in)
- Curb weight: 930 kg (2,050 lb)

The Datsun DS-5 entered production in February 1953 and was largely the same as the DS-4, with a new grille design and powered by the new 860cc Type 10 engine producing 25 PS (18 kW). The DS-5 was in production until mid-1954, when it was replaced by the completely redesigned Datsun DS-6.

== Datsun DS-6 ==
Datsun DS-6 Convar

Overview
- Production: June 1954 – November 1954

Body and chassis
- Body style: 4-door sedan

Powertrain
- Engine: 860 cc D-10 SV I4
- Transmission: 3-speed manual

The Datsun DS-6 Convar (a portmanteau of "Convenient Car") was released in July 1954 and was more modern than the DS-4 and DS-5. The DS-6 was based on the DS-5 and used its drivetrain. The front-end was unique with a flat panel (with "DATSUN" in individual letters) between the hood opening and the grille, which was oval in shape and divided horizontally by the bumper bar. The trunk lid lifted up rather than folded down, while the earlier DS-series' front suicide doors were replaced with conventionally hinged units.

Hurried in development, the DS-6 was only in production until the end of the year, when it was replaced by the all new Datsun 110 which went on sale in January 1955. Aside from its unusual looks, the Convar was also rather heavy. The car underwent very little testing before going on sale: the bodywork was weak, particularly at the rear, while cast door hinges failed at a high rate, leading to a multitude of customer complaints. Nissan, already far along with development of the all-new 110, did not have the resources to remedy the Convar's problems and in the end only about 500 cars were built.
