= Datsun Type 12 =

Car model

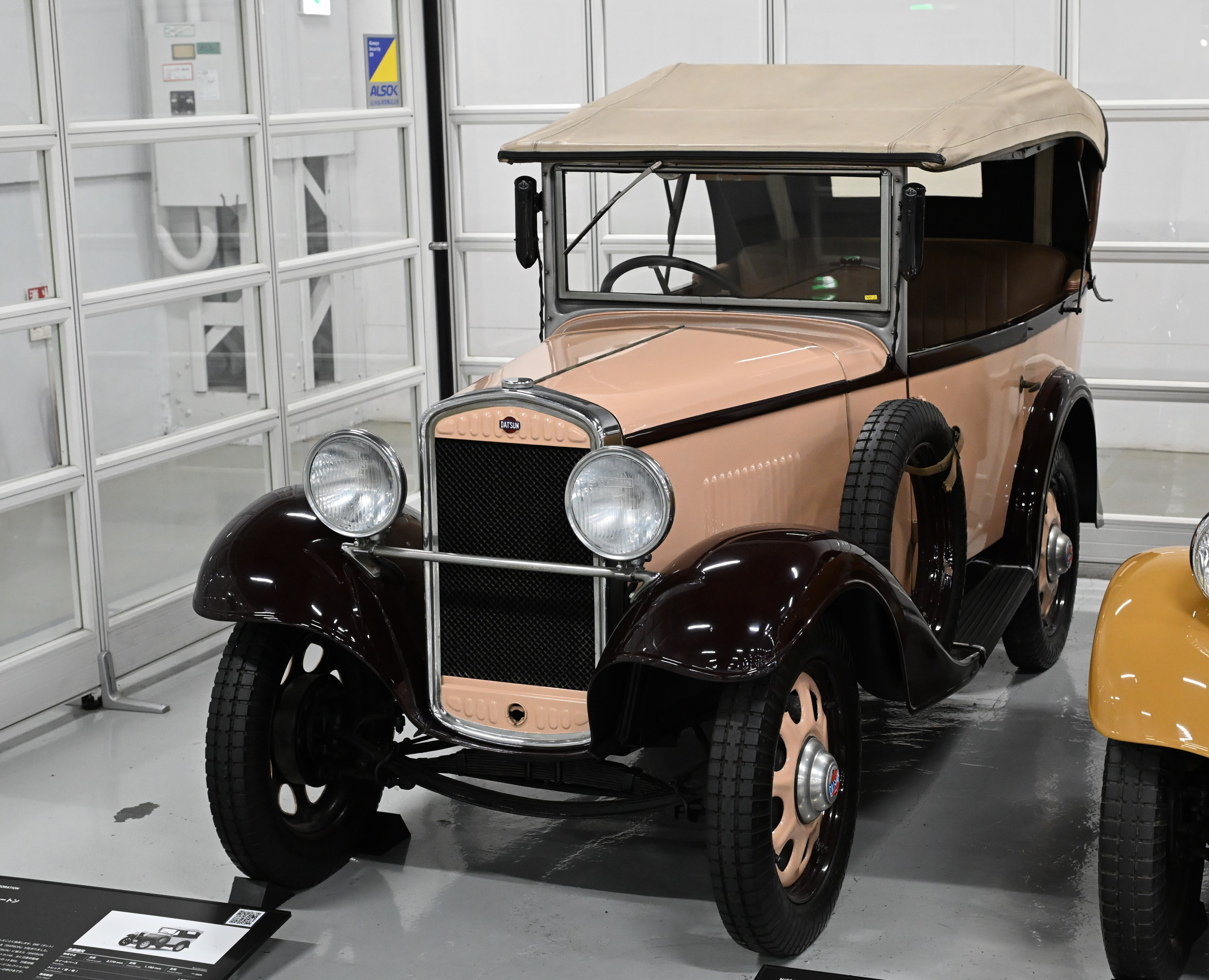

Overview
- Manufacturer: Datsun/Nissan
- Production: 1933; 150 produced
- Assembly: Yanase Motor/Nihon Jidosha Corp. (body); Tobata Casting (chassis)

Body and chassis
- Body style: phaeton, roadster, sedan
- Layout: FR layout

Powertrain
- Engine: 747 cc DAT SV I4
- Transmission: 3-speed manual

Dimensions
- Wheelbase: 1,880 mm (74.0 in)
- Length: 2,710 mm (106.7 in)
- Width: 1,175 mm (46.3 in)
- Curb weight: 400 kg (882 lb)

Chronology
- Predecessor: Datsun Type 11
- Successor: Datsun Type 13

The Datsun Type 12 was a small car produced by Nissan Motor Co., Ltd. in 1933.

== Description ==
The 1933 Datsun Type 12 was a small car produced by Nissan under Datsun marque (which was used by DAT for their line of small cars). After the DAT corporation was absorbed into Nissan, these cars continued to be produced, and the original model name was maintained. The Type 12 was basically similar to the earlier 1932 Datsun Type 11, but had a larger engine.

Japanese laws at that time did not require a license to drive automobiles with small-displacement engines. DAT/Nissan produced the Type 11 as their entry into this market. The original limitation for this class of vehicles was 500 cc displacement engines, but that was changed to 750 cc in 1933. Nissan responded to this change by producing a larger engine, and gave the more powerful car a new name, the Type 12. The Type 12 was superseded by the Datsun Type 13 in July 1934.
