= Nissan U-R =

Overview
- Manufacturer: Nissan Motors/Datsun
- Production: 1959-???

Body and chassis
- Doors: 1 (behind front axle)
- Floor type: Step entrance
- Related: Nissan 680 Truck

Powertrain
- Engine: 3.7L UD3 I3 diesel
- Capacity: 64 passengers (NUR-690); 69 passengers (UR-690)
- Power output: 125 hp @ 2200 rpm
- Transmission: 5-speed manual

Dimensions
- Wheelbase: 4,300 mm (169.3 in)
- Length: 8,680 mm (341.7 in) (NUR-690); 9,130 mm (359.4 in) (UR-690)
- Width: 2,460 mm (96.9 in)
- Curb weight: 6,190 kg (13,647 lb) (NUR-690); 6,320 kg (13,933 lb) (UR-690)

The Nissan U-R was a full-sized single-decker bus made by Nissan Motors/Datsun in the 1960s, available in two models: the UR-690 and NUR-690. The range was only available in a public bus configuration, can be either built as an integral bus or a bus chassis.

== Specifications ==
=== Engines ===
The UR-690 and NUR-690 buses were rear engine models, powered by a UD3 3-cylinder diesel unit with 3706cc, giving 125 bhp at 2200rpm, and 45.5 kg-m torque at 1400rpm.

=== Capacity ===
The UR-690 is a 69-passenger vehicle, while the NUR-690 carries 64.

=== Suspension ===
Suspension on both models is by leaf springs front and rear, with shock absorbers on the front only.
