= Datsun Type 16 =

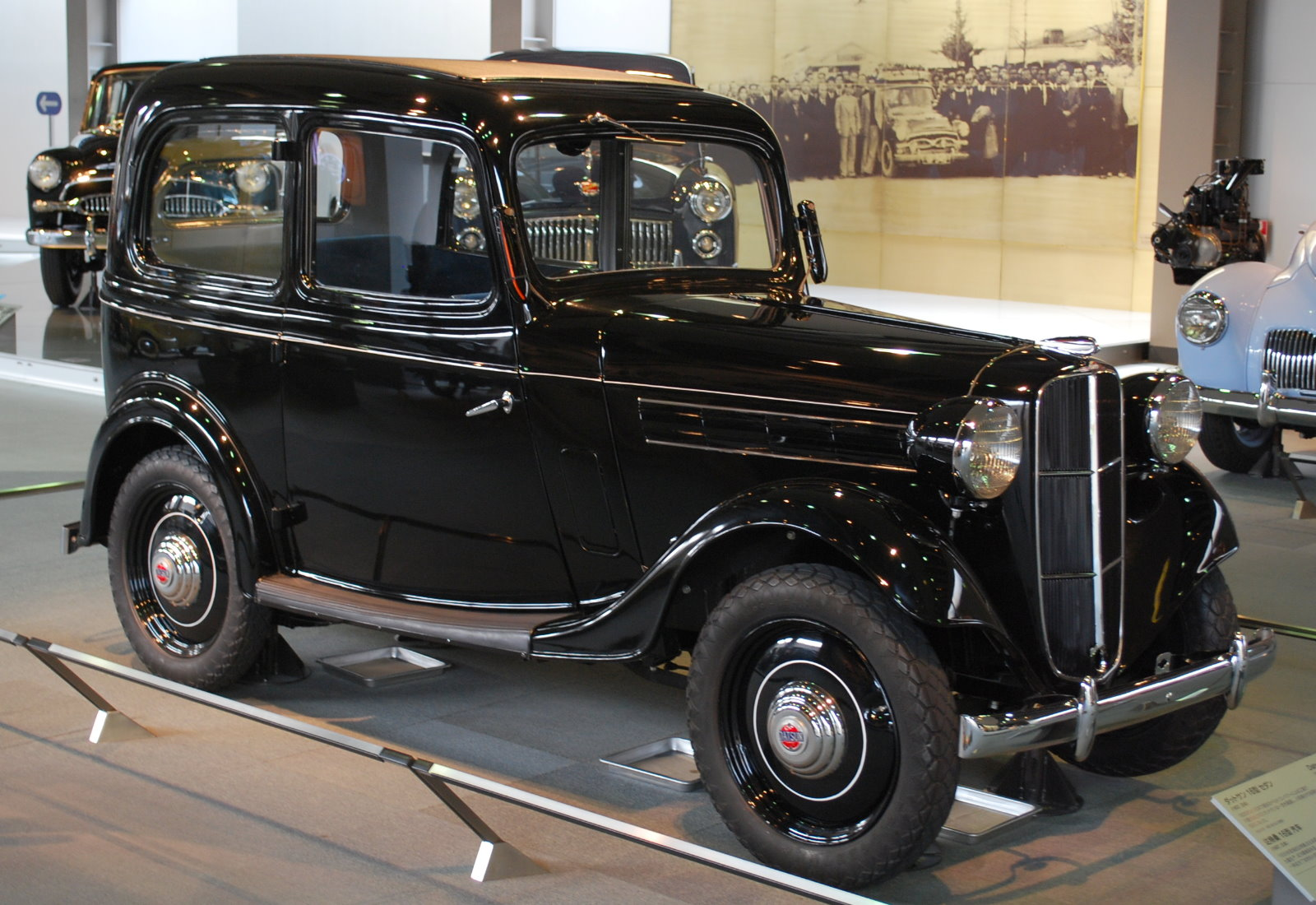
- Datsun Model 16 Sedan

Overview
- Manufacturer: Datsun/Nissan
- Production: 1937–1938
- Assembly: Japan: Yokohama

Body and chassis
- Body style: Phaeton; Roadster; Coupe; Sedan
- Layout: Front-engine, rear-wheel-drive

Powertrain
- Engine: 722 cc (44.1 in^{3}) Type 7 I4
- Transmission: 3-speed manual

Dimensions
- Wheelbase: 2,005 mm (78.9 in)
- Length: 3,120 mm (122.8 in)
- Width: 1,190 mm (46.9 in)
- Curb weight: 610 kg (1,340 lb)

Chronology
- Predecessor: Datsun Type 15
- Successor: Datsun Type 17

The Datsun Type 16 was a small car produced by Datsun in Japan in 1937 and 1938. It had a 16 PS (12 kW) side valve engine and was offered in several body styles.

== Design ==
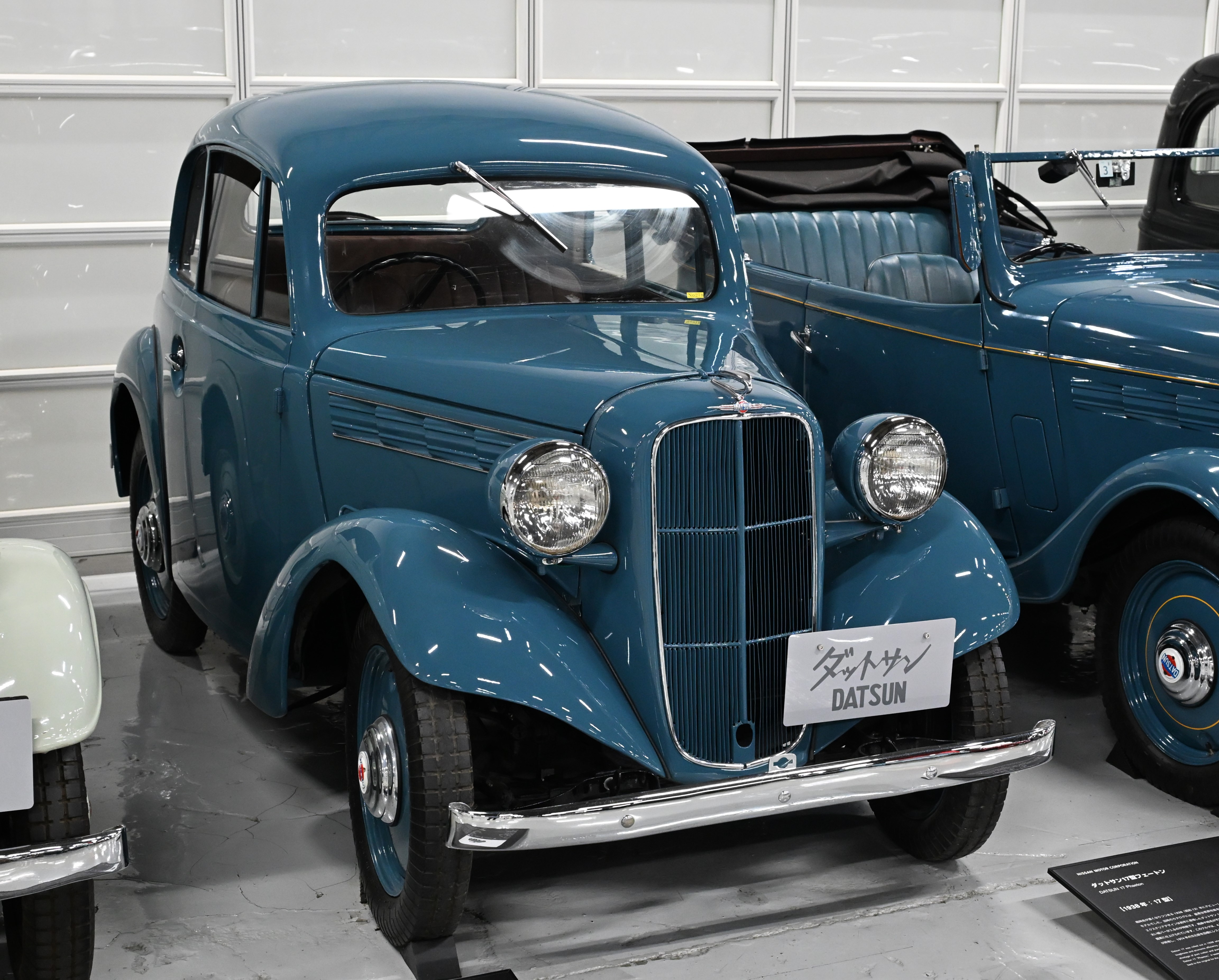
Datsun Model 16 Coupe

The Datsun 16 was almost identical to the preceding Datsun Type 15 and could only be differentiated externally by detailing on the bonnet and changes in the bonnet mascot and Datsun logo. The interior was more sparse than the Type 15.

== Drivetrain ==
The Datsun 16 was mechanically identical to the preceding Datsun Type 15. The 16 PS (12 kW) engine drove the rear wheels through a three-speed gearbox to give the car a top speed of 80 km/h (50 mph).

== Production ==
The first Datsun 16 rolled off the production line in Yokohama in April 1937 and production continued until the Datsun 17 was released in April 1938.
