= Datsun Type 11 =

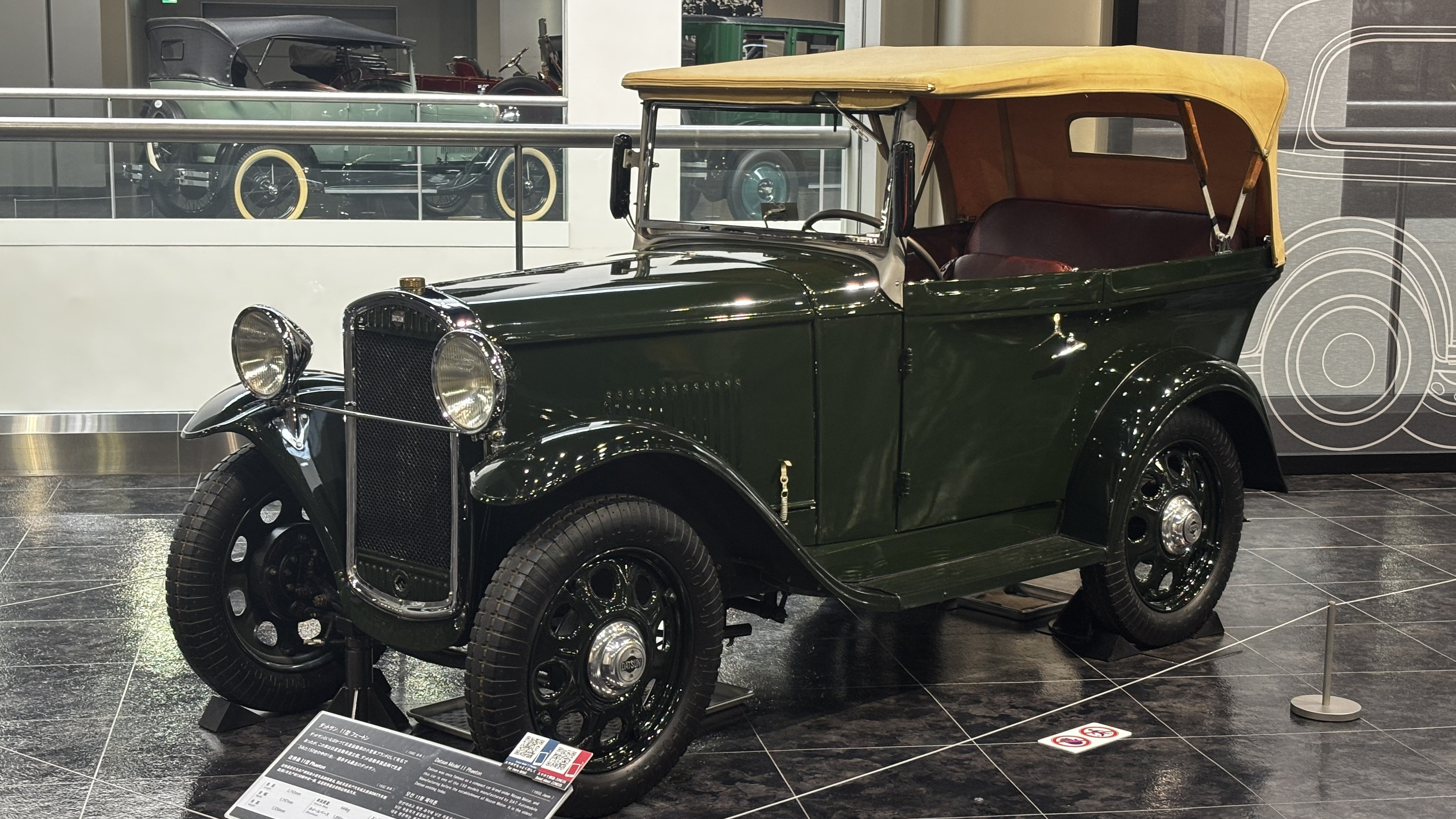

Overview
- Manufacturer: Datsun/Nissan
- Also called: Austin 7
- Production: 1932; 150 produced
- Assembly: Japan
- Designer: Noriyoshi Gotoh

Body and chassis
- Body style: phaeton, roadster, coupe, sedan, van
- Layout: FR layout

Powertrain
- Engine: 495 cc DAT side-valve I4
- Transmission: 3 speed manual

Dimensions
- Wheelbase: 1,880 mm (74.0 in)
- Length: 2,710 mm (106.7 in)
- Width: 1,175 mm (46.3 in)
- Curb weight: 400 kg (880 lb)

Chronology
- Predecessor: Datsun Type 10
- Successor: Datsun Type 12

The Datsun Type 11 was a small car with a 495 cc, 10 HP side valve engine and a three speed transmission. It was offered in several body styles, and DAT/Nissan sold 150 of the Type 11 in 1932. The Type 11 was only produced during the year 1932, as changes in the law allowed Nissan to sell a new model with a larger engine in 1933.

== History ==
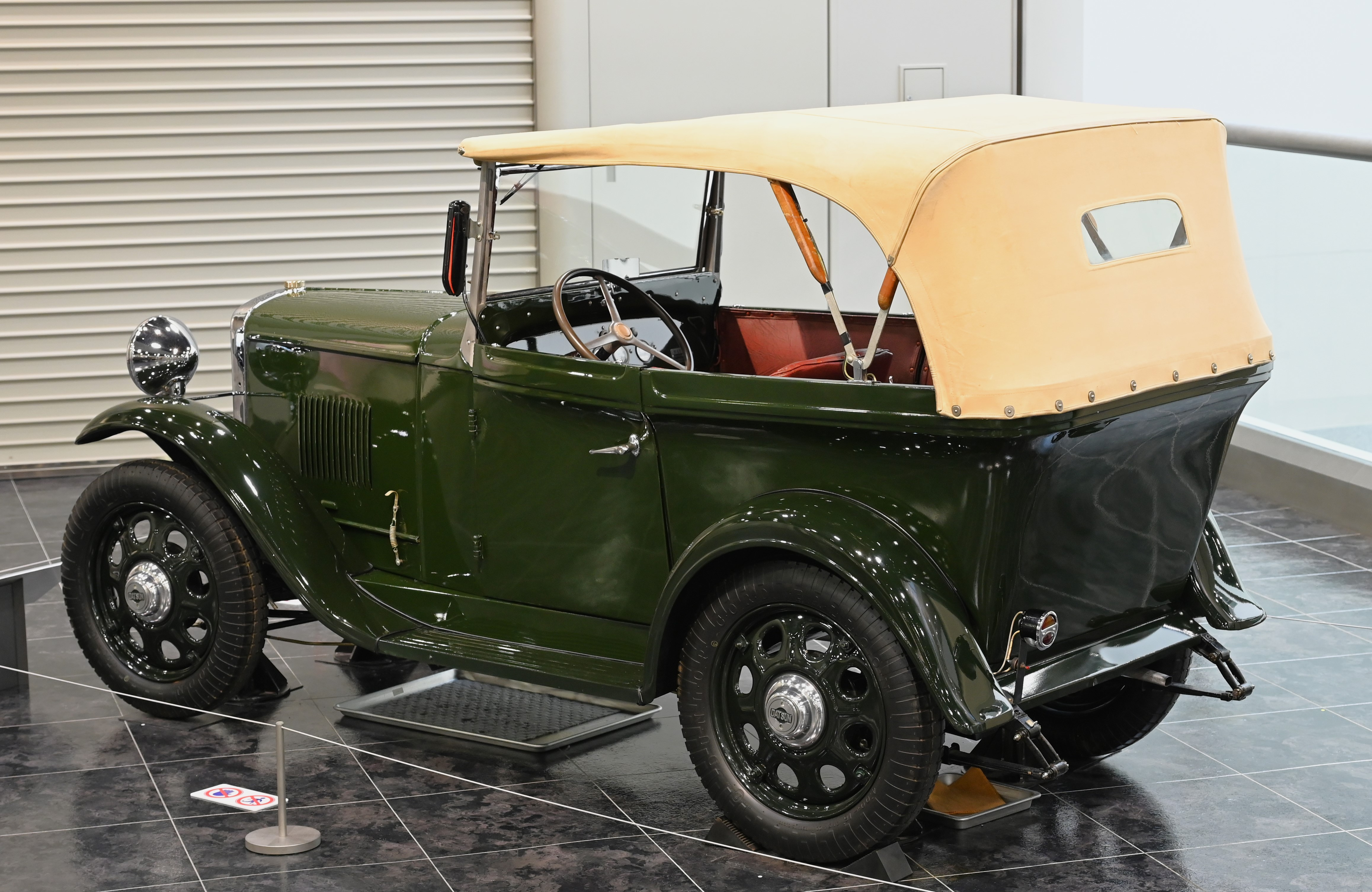
1932 Datsun Model 11 Phaeton rear

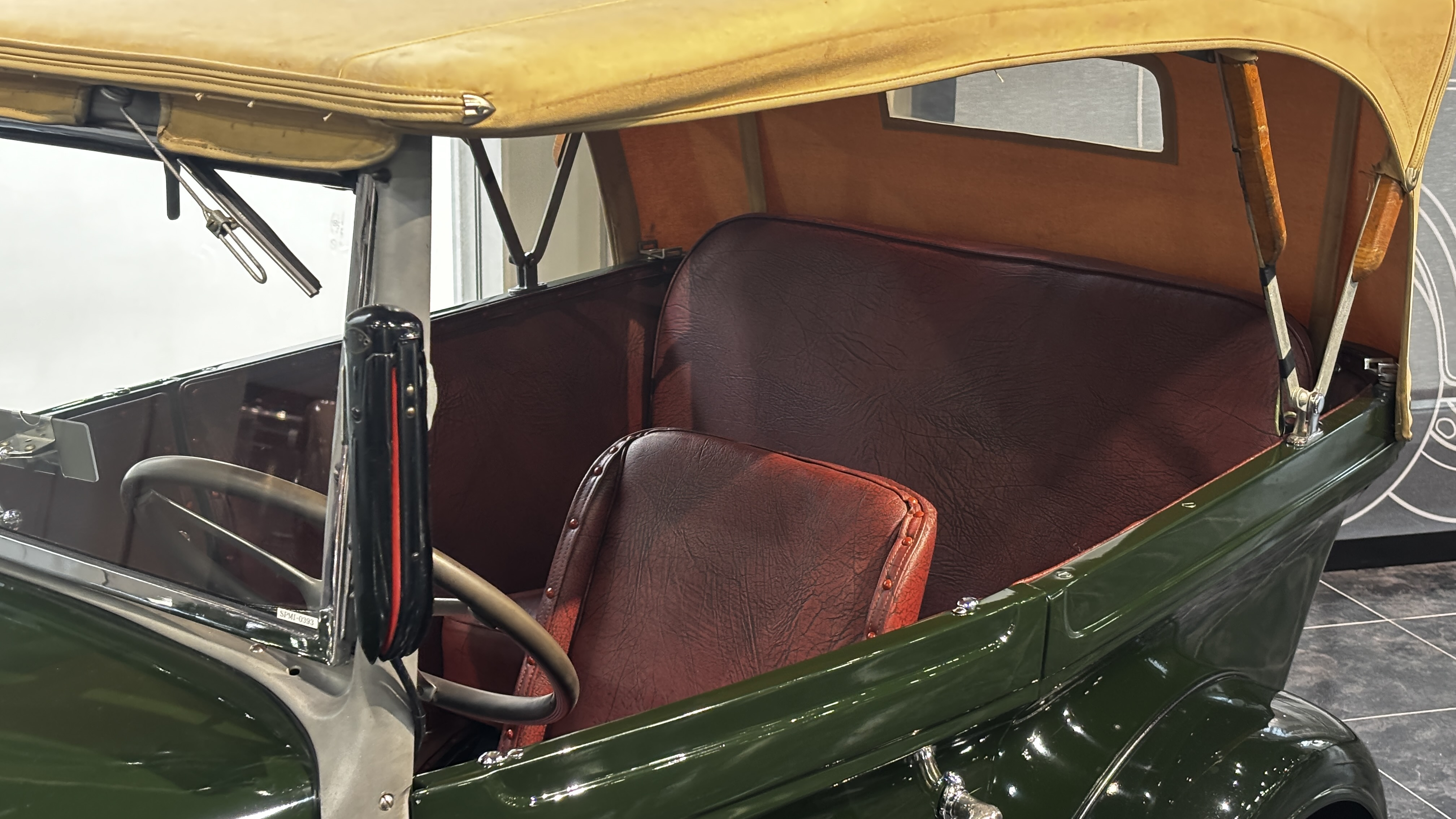
1932 Datsun Model 11 Phaeton interior

The DAT corporation had been producing cars since 1914, but through the 1920s, much of their profitability depended on government subsidies of their large trucks. A 1930 ministerial ordinance by the Japanese government declared that drivers' licenses would not be required for cars with engines up to 500 cc displacement, and that the purchase of these vehicles would be taxed at a lower road tax rate. DAT began to produce a small car for this market. The new car was called "Datson" (i.e. "Son of DAT") and later "Datsun" to distinguish it from the full sized trucks and cars the company had produced in the past.

== Relationship to Austin 7 ==
The Datsun Type 11 had the same engine displacement and external dimensions as an Austin 7, and information about the British car was widely available within Japan. In October and November 1929, the chief engineer of Austin presented a paper in Tokyo called "The British Light Car". This paper is supposed to have provided detailed explanations and illustrations of many of the mechanical components of the Austin Seven. The exact relationship between the two cars is, however, in dispute.

Some authors say that it was a licensed copy of the Seven. Others say it was a copy, but not an authorized one. Herbert Austin was definitely concerned about the possibility of Datsun infringing on his patents; he imported a Datsun car in 1935 in order to examine it, but decided to not file a complaint. Some websites have pointed to this as evidence supporting the hypothesis that the Datsun was not a copy of the Austin. Other websites have pointed out that the decision to not press charges might have been because by then, the Datsun designs had begun to differ from the Austin.

== See also ==
- Datsun
- Nissan
- Kei Car
- Austin Seven
