= Datsun Type 15 =

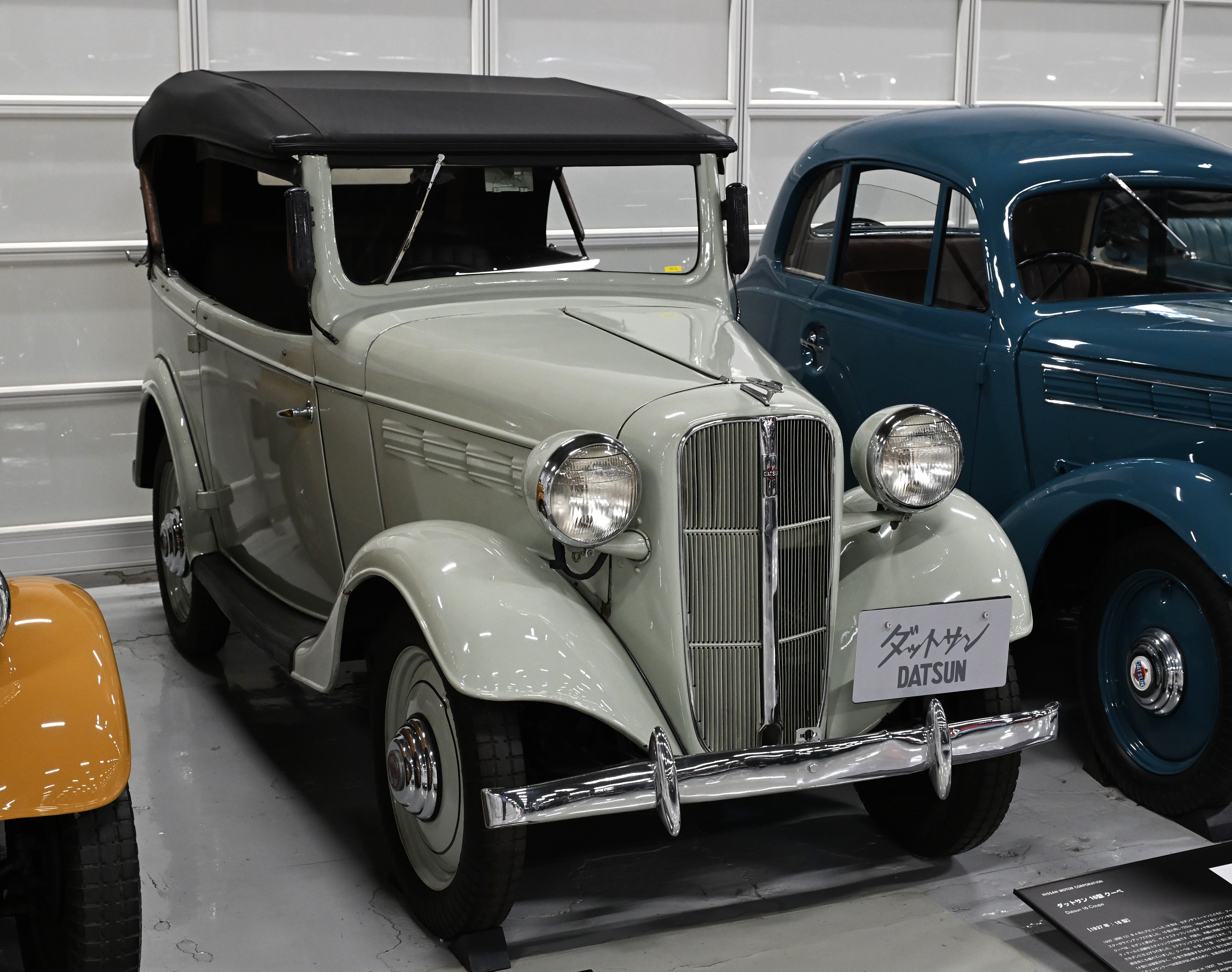
- Datsun Model 15 Phaeton

Overview
- Manufacturer: Datsun/Nissan
- Model years: 1936–1937
- Assembly: Japan: Yokohama

Body and chassis
- Body style: Phaeton; Roadster; Coupe; Sedan; Van
- Layout: FR layout

Powertrain
- Engine: 722 cc (44.1 in^{3}) Type 7 I4
- Transmission: 3-speed manual

Dimensions
- Wheelbase: 2,005 mm (78.9 in)
- Length: 3,187 mm (125.5 in)
- Width: 1,190 mm (46.9 in)

Chronology
- Predecessor: Datsun Type 14
- Successor: Datsun Type 16

The Datsun Type 15 was a small car produced in Japan from 1936 to 1937. Derived from the Datsun Type 14, it succeeded the earlier vehicle in production in 1936. It was larger than its predecessor but had less chrome detail due to shortages caused by the conflict in Manchuria. It had a 16 PS (12 kW) side valve engine and was offered in several body styles. The front recalled American designs of the time, but on a smaller scale.

== Design ==
The Datsun 15 was mechanically very similar to the preceding Datsun Type 14 from which it was derived. The Type 7 engine was retained, by with a higher compression ratio, increased from 5.2 to 5.4, which increased power by 1 hp (0.75 kW). The engine drove the rear wheels through a three speed gearbox to give the car a top speed of 80 km/h (50 mph). Externally, the car was larger than its predecessor, with a wheelbase of 2,005 mm (78.9 in), length of 3,187 mm (125.5 in) and width of 1,190 mm (46.9 in). However, it had less chrome detail as material was becoming harder to find because of the war in Manchuria; similarly, the interior was larger but more sparse. The front end resembled American cars of the period, but on a smaller scale. All Datsun 15 models had bumpers.

== Production ==
The first Datsun 15 rolled off the production line in Yokohama in May 1936 and production continued until the Datsun 16 was released in April 1937. The majority were for home use, but 87 were exported.

== Datsun 15T ==
Between May 1936 and April 1938 Nissan produced the Datsun 15T truck based on the Datsun 15. The engine cover was different, with near vertical vents instead of the cars horizontal vents.
