= Datsun Type 17 =

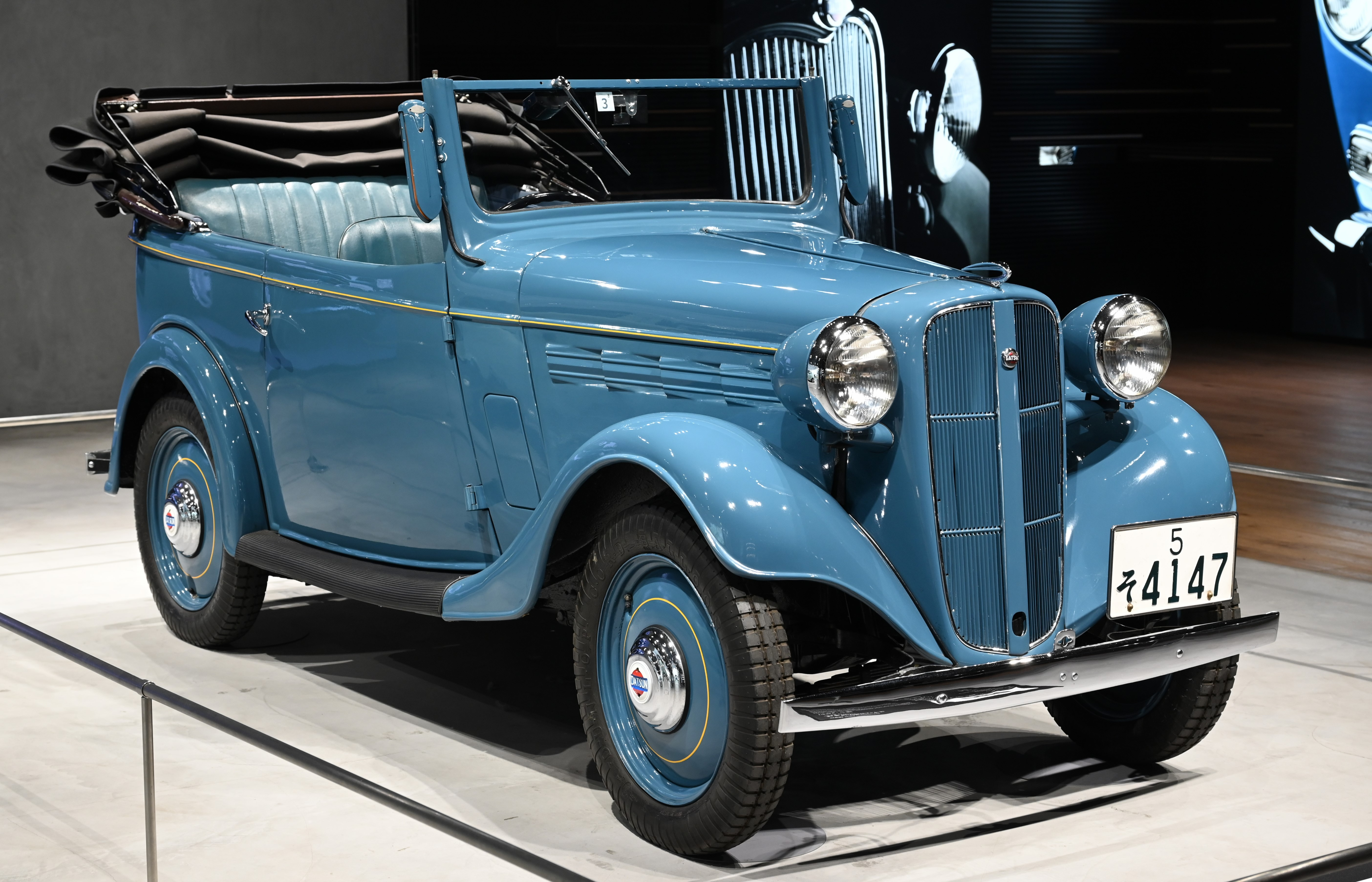
- Datsun Model 17 Phaeton

Overview
- Manufacturer: Datsun/Nissan
- Production: 1938 (Note: Nissan claims that production continued until January 1944.)
- Assembly: Japan: Yokohama

Body and chassis
- Body style: Phaeton; Roadster; Coupe; Sedan
- Layout: Front-engine, rear-wheel-drive

Powertrain
- Engine: 722 cc (44.1 cu in) Type 7 I4
- Transmission: 3-speed manual

Dimensions
- Wheelbase: 2,005 mm (78.9 in)
- Length: 3,187 mm (125.5 in)
- Width: 1,190 mm (46.9 in)
- Curb weight: 630 kg (1,390 lb)

Chronology
- Predecessor: Datsun Type 16
- Successor: Datsun DA

The Datsun Type 17 is a small car produced by Datsun in Japan either in 1938 exclusively or from 1938 to 1944. It was the last in a line of Datsun small cars produced before Nissan's resources were diverted to military materials for the Second Sino-Japanese War.

== Design ==
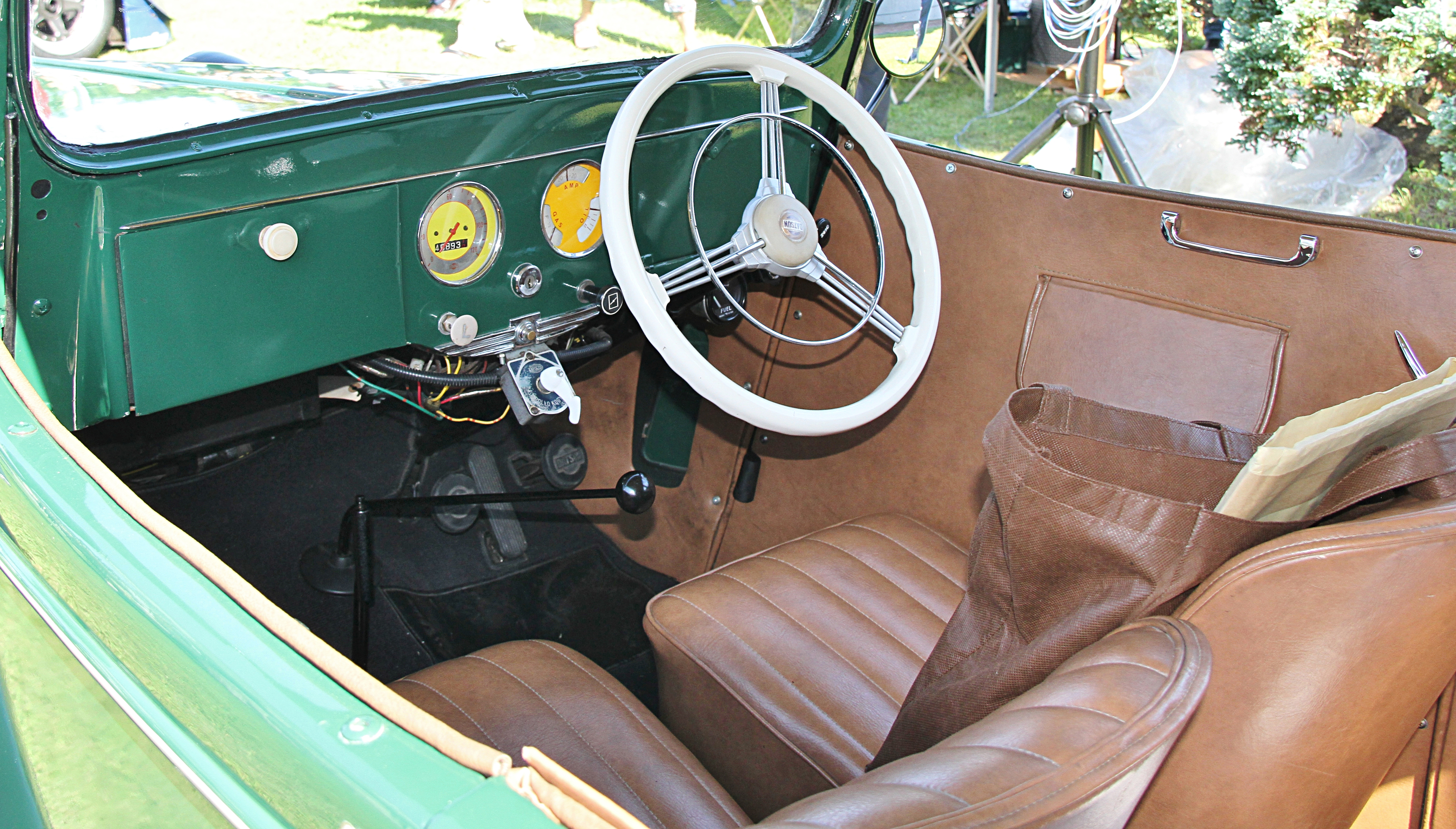
Interior

The Datsun 17 was almost identical to the preceding Datsun 16 but distinguished by a wide vertical bar in middle of the front grille and a simpler interior.

== Drivetrain ==
The Datsun 17 was mechanically identical to the preceding Datsun 16. The 16 PS (11.8 kW) engine drove the rear wheels through a 3-speed gearbox to give the car a top speed of 80 km/h (50 mph).

== Production ==
Production of the Datsun 17 started in Yokohama in April 1938 and, according to Nissan, continued until January 1944, although Alan Bent claims that it finished in late 1938 as part of the cessation civilian car production that followed the Japanese decision to focus on military vehicles.

== See also ==
- Datsun 17T
