= Nissan Almera =

Car model and nameplate by Nissan

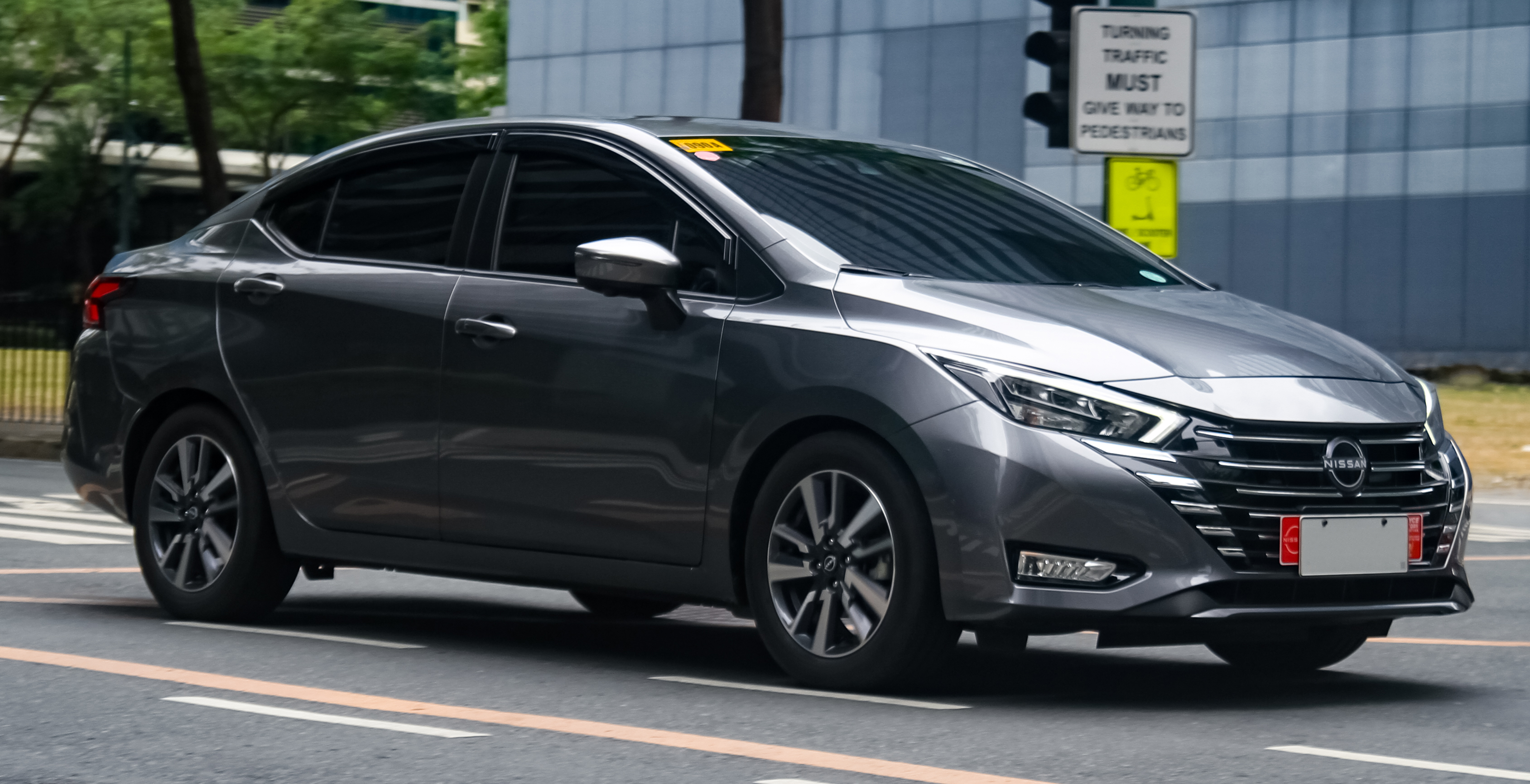
- 2023 Nissan Almera (N18)

Overview
- Manufacturer: Nissan
- Also called: Nissan Pulsar (1995–2008); Nissan Sentra (1995–2000); Nissan Bluebird Sylphy (2000–2008); Nissan Latio (2011–2019); Nissan Sunny (2011–present); Nissan Versa (2011–present); Nissan V-Drive (2019–present)
- Production: 1995–2008; 2011–present

Body and chassis
- Class: Compact car (C) (1995–2008); Subcompact car (B) (2011–present)
- Layout: Front-engine, front-wheel-drive

Chronology
- Predecessor: Nissan Pulsar/Sunny (N14)

The Nissan Almera is a line of sedans produced by Japanese manufacturer Nissan since 1995. The early generations, including the first-generation N15 and second-generation N16, were classified as compact cars (C-segment) and were essentially the European export versions of the Nissan Pulsar.

Starting with the third-generation N17, the Almera was reclassified as a subcompact sedan (B-segment), built on the Nissan V platform. This version has been marketed under five different nameplates in various international markets.

== First generation (N15; 1995) ==
First generation
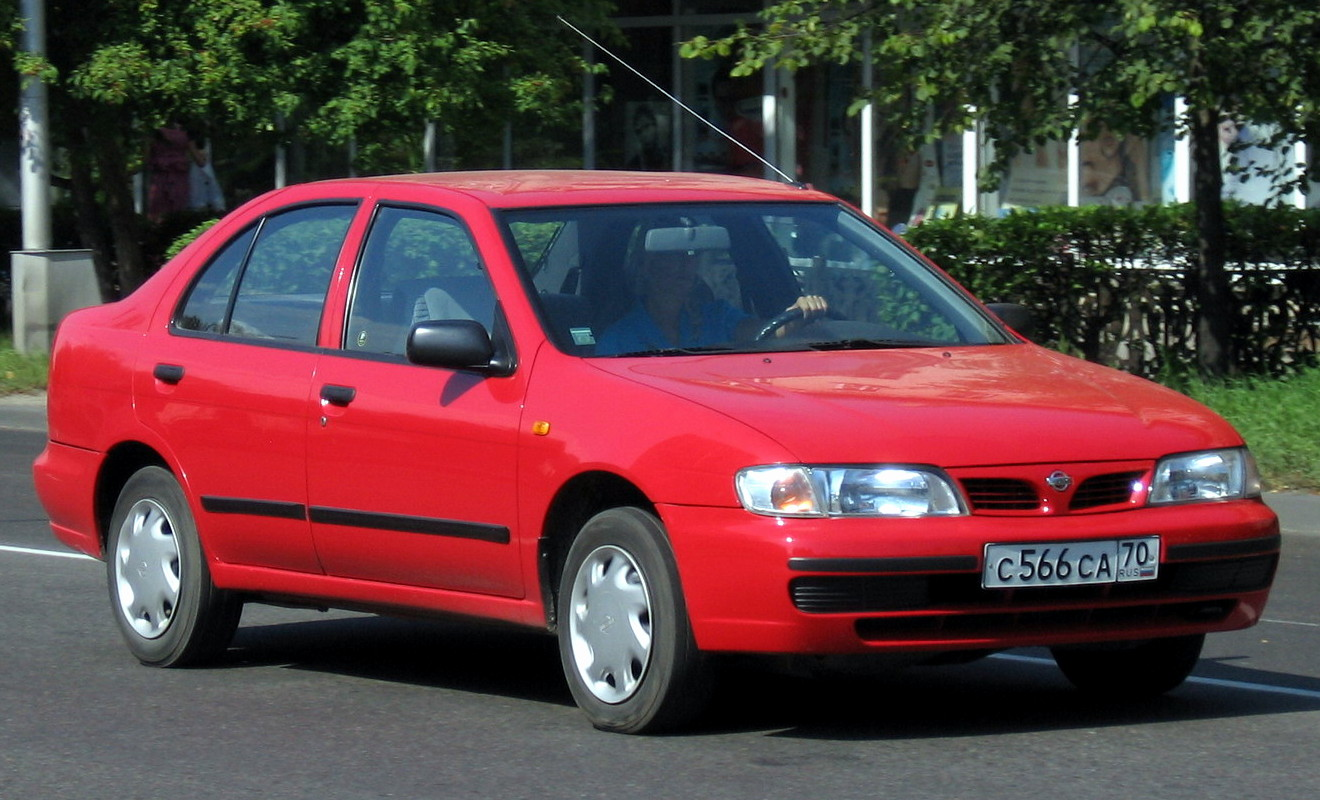

Overview
- Model code: N15
- Also called: Nissan Pulsar (Japan, Australia); Nissan Sentra (New Zealand); Nissan Lucino (Japan)
- Production: 1995–2000
- Assembly: Japan: Oppama

Body and chassis
- Body style: 3/5-door hatchback 4-door saloon/sedan

Powertrain
- Engine: Petrol: 1.4 L GA14DE I4; 1.6 L GA16DE I4; 2.0 L SR20DE I4; Diesel: 2.0 L CD20 I4
- Transmission: 5-speed manual 4-speed automatic

Dimensions
- Wheelbase: 2,535 mm (99.8 in)
- Length: 4,120 mm (162.2 in)
- Width: 1,690 mm (66.5 in)
- Height: 1,395 mm (54.9 in)
- Kerb weight: 1,035 kg (2,282 lb)

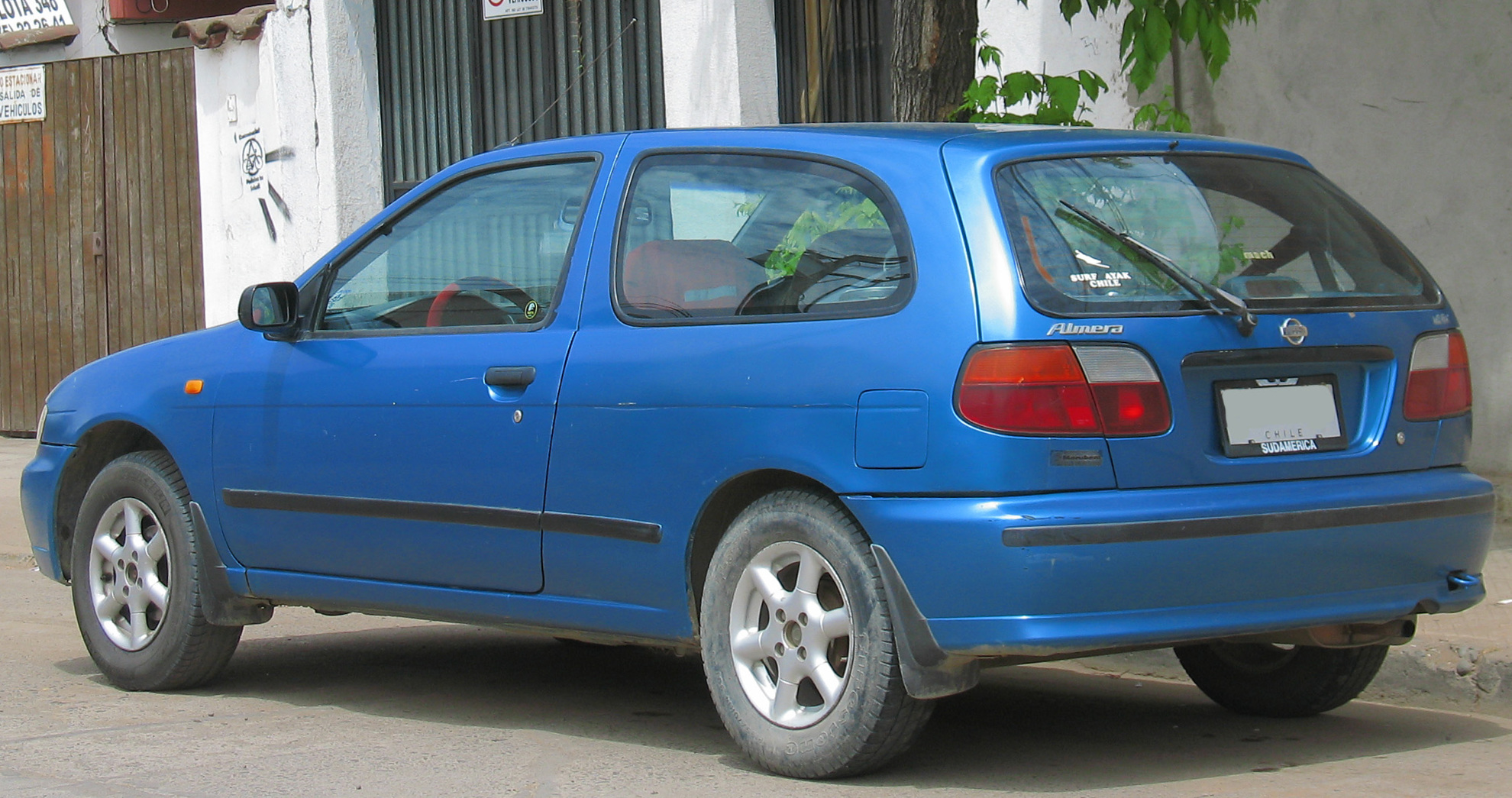
Nissan Almera 1.6 GX 3-door hatchback (Chile)

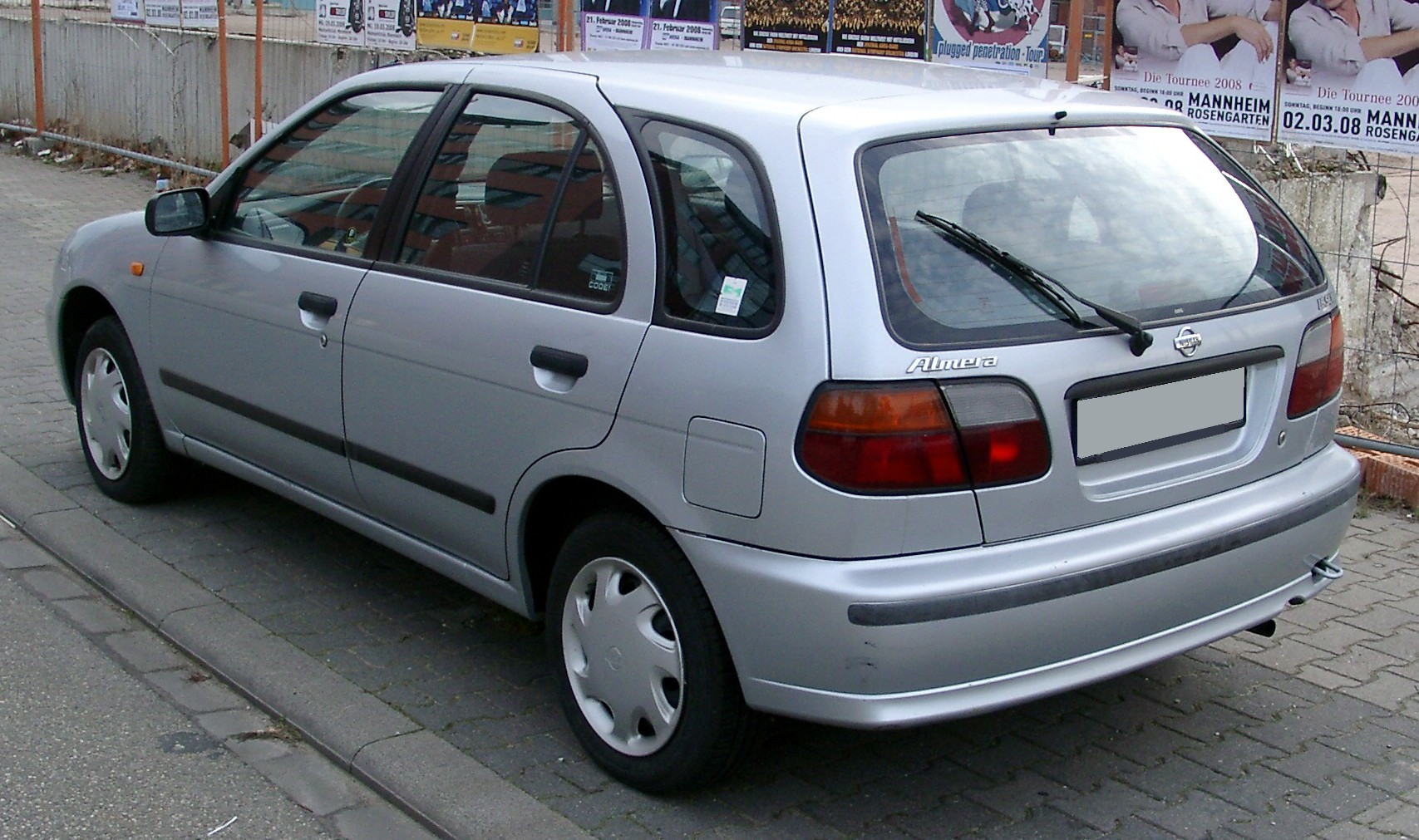
Nissan Almera 5-door hatchback (Germany)

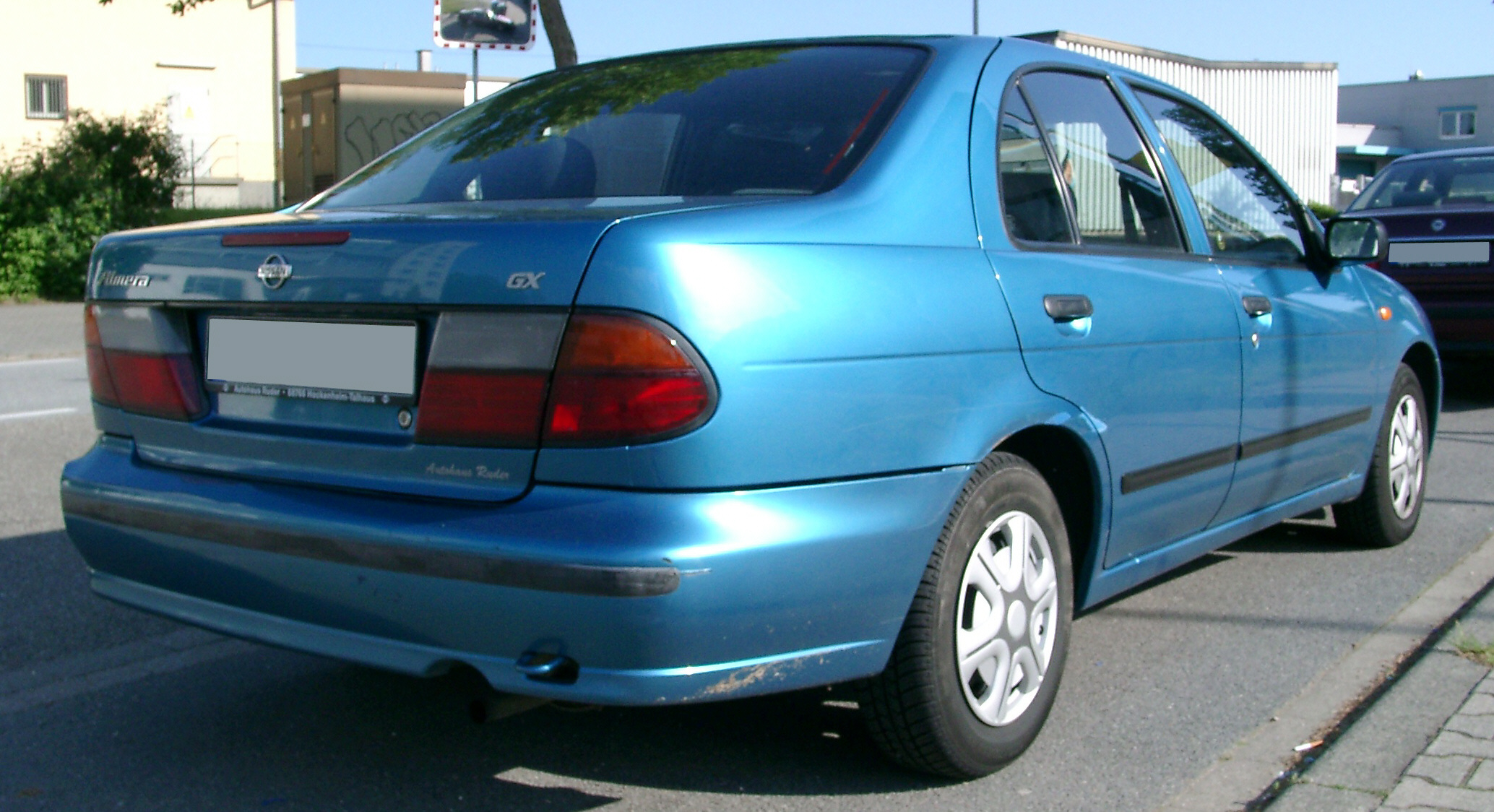
Nissan Almera GX saloon (Germany)

The first Almera model was manufactured in late 1995 as a replacement for the Nissan Sunny (N14), a nameplate which had been in use for nearly 30 years. The Almera was almost identical to the Nissan Pulsar (N15) sold in Japan, apart from different trim options and petrol engine range.

Early production models were equipped with either a 1.4L GA14DE and 1.6L GA16DE petrol engine or a 2.0L CD20 diesel engine. Approximately one year into production, a 2.0L SR20DE GTi was added to the range. The three non-sporting engine options were available in either a three- or five-door hatchback or as a four-door saloon variant. In contrast, the GTi version was only available in the three-door hatchback variant.

In the United Kingdom, the Almera was originally marketed by Nissan as "The car they don't want you to drive". Almost all Almeras sold in the UK were hatchbacks, in contrast to regions such as Ireland, where the saloon proved more popular. The line's high specification made it notable at the time, with all models including power steering, airbags, electric mirrors, and a stereo.

=== Pre-facelift ===
Typical models offered were as follows, with each market differing in detail:

- 1.4 S, LX, GX, Si GA14DE
- 1.6 SLX, SR/SRi GA16DE
- 2.0 GTi SR20DE
- 2.0D GX, SLX CD20

The top versions included 'high spec' bumpers with fog lights (optional on the Si model), alloy wheels from 1996 onward (Size and design differed between the Si/SRi 14" and GTi 15").

GTi models sported a roof spoiler with an integrated brake light as standard, which was also available as an option on the Si model. In later model years, there were a number of special models and market-specific equipment levels such as the Comfort, Ambiente, Esteem, Precision, and many others.

The 2.0-litre GTi had an optional, aggressive-looking factory body kit which included BMW M3-style side skirts and front and rear splitters. Models without the body kit came with a simpler plastic front splitter. The GTi also featured uprated suspension, front and rear strut braces, and a quicker steering rack along with the 143 PS (105 kW; 141 hp) 2-litre engine.

=== Facelift ===
The Almera received a facelift for the 1998 model year. For phase 2, the front bumpers were redesigned, front splitters were added on the Si/SRi, and the GTi had an all-round body kit as standard (although there was also a delete option available). From this point, all of the lip spoilers came with an integrated brake light. The original telescopic radio aerial was relocated from the driver's A-pillar to the rear of the roof and modified to a "bee-sting" type. On the GTi, the phase 2 headlights and front indicators featured a black surround.

Towards the end of production around the start of 1999, the GTi models came as standard from the factory with all items which has previously been optional extras, for example ABS, Air Conditioning, updated interior trim, and front seat pockets.

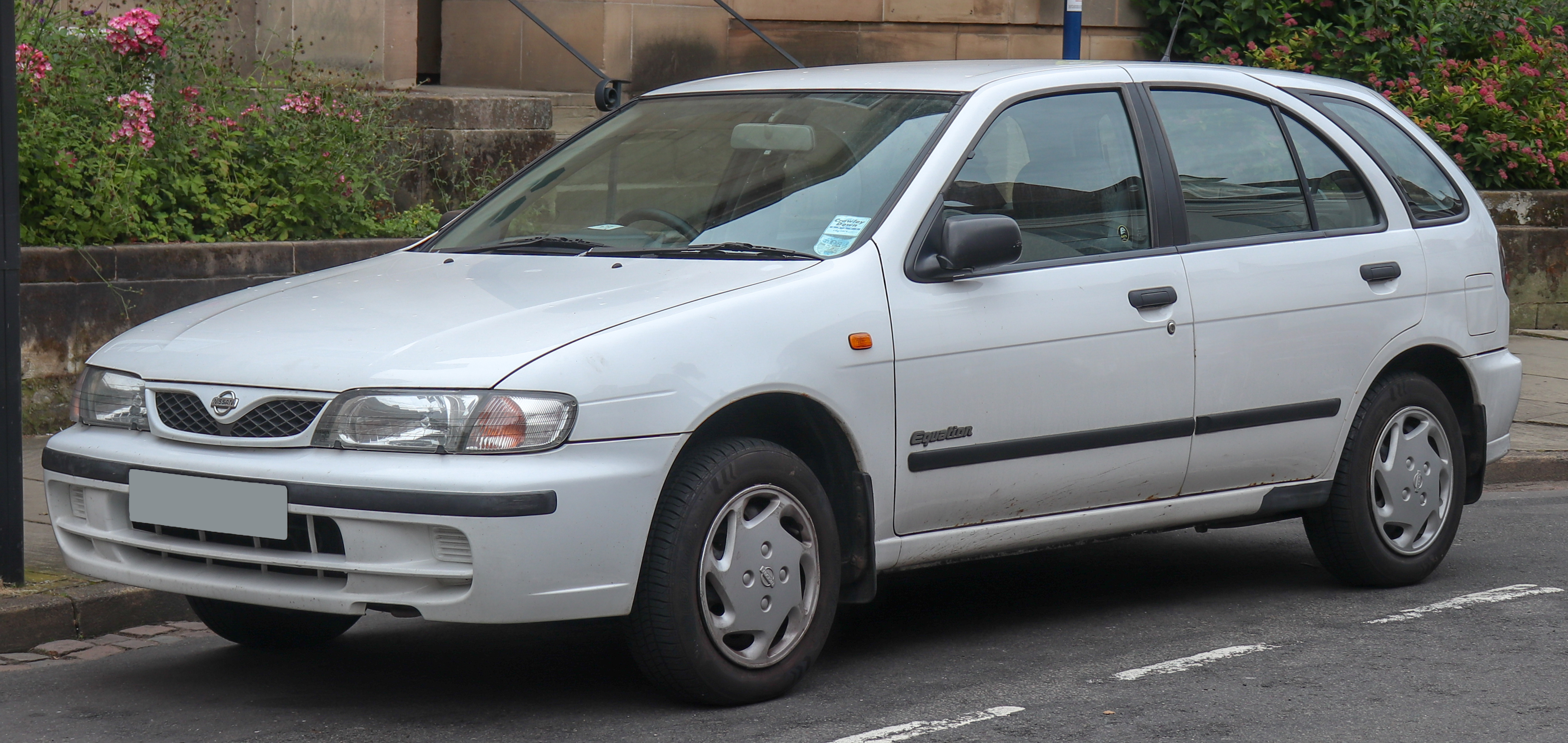
1998 Nissan Almera Equation 1.4 (UK; facelift)

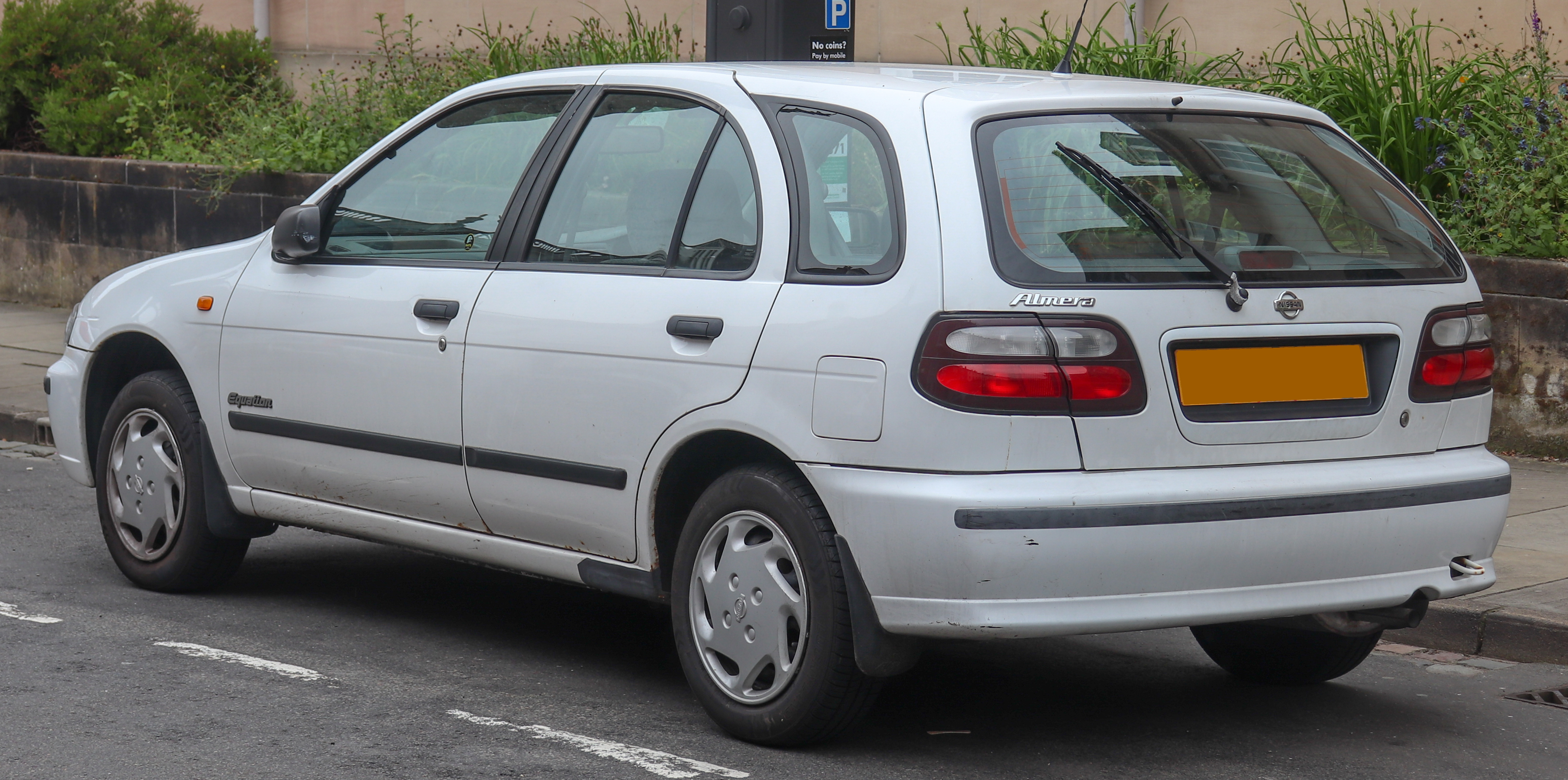
1998 Nissan Almera Equation 1.4 (UK; facelift)

== Second generation (N16; 2000) ==
Second generation
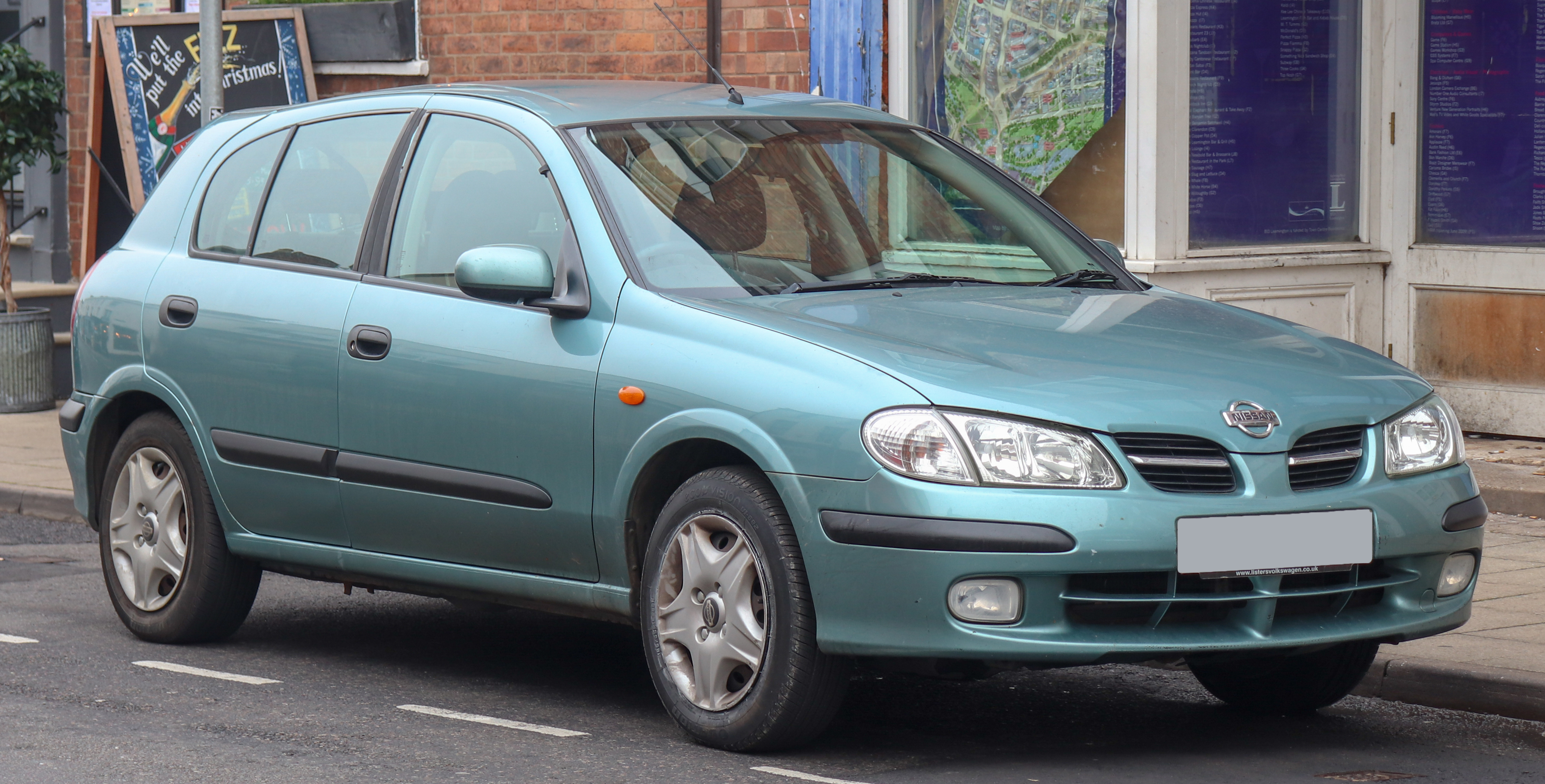
- 2003 Nissan Almera E 5-door (UK; pre-facelift)

Overview
- Model code: N16
- Also called: Nissan Bluebird Sylphy; Nissan Pulsar
- Production: 2000–2008
- Assembly: Japan: Oppama Plant, Yokosuka, Kanagawa; China: Guangzhou (DMCL); Malaysia: Kuala Lumpur; Philippines: Santa Rosa City; Thailand: Samut Prakan: South Africa: Rosslyn, Gauteng (National Car Corporation) United Kingdom: Sunderland (NMUK)
- Designer: Yusuke Kojima (1997)

Body and chassis
- Body style: 3/5-door hatchback 4-door saloon/sedan
- Platform: Nissan MS platform

Powertrain
- Engine: Petrol: 1.5 L QG15DE I4; 1.6 L QG16DE I4; 1.8 L QG18DE I4; Diesel: 1.5 L K9K I4; 2.2 L YD22DDTi I4
- Transmission: 5-speed manual 6-speed manual 4-speed automatic

Dimensions
- Wheelbase: 2,535 mm (99.8 in)
- Length: 4,184 mm (164.7 in)
- Width: 1,706 mm (67.2 in)
- Height: 1,448 mm (57.0 in)
- Kerb weight: 1,285 kg (2,833 lb)

Chronology
- Successor: Nissan Tiida (C11)

Launched in January 2000, the second-generation Almera differed from its predecessor with smoother and more curved lines. For Europe, this generation of Almera was produced at the Sunderland factory, which had opened in 1986 and produced the Micra, Primera, and originally the Bluebird.

The N16 Almera is based on Nissan's global MS platform, which was Nissan's first new platform to be developed after the partnership with Renault. The MS platform is also the base for the P12 Primera and Almera Tino.

The second-generation Almera was available in three different body styles, a three- or five-door hatch and a four-door saloon/sedan with 1.5, 1.6, and 1.8 Nissan QG engine series petrol engines as well as a 2.2 direct injection turbo-diesel (110 bhp) (YD22DDT) or common-rail turbo-diesel (136 bhp) (YD22DDTi).

Almeras can be also equipped with 1.5 common-rail turbo-diesel (dCi) from the Renault Mégane II – Nissan had recently ventured with Renault, and the Almera's diesel engine was one of the first instances of Nissan and Renault's sharing of mechanical underpinnings. Early versions of the 1.5-litre engine were fitted with a mechanical throttle, which was later replaced by a drive-by-wire electronic throttle.

The Almera five-door hatchback was exported from the UK to Australia and New Zealand and sold as part of the Nissan Pulsar (N16) lineup in these countries. The Almera sedan is based on the Bluebird Sylphy, but has a different front end.

The Almera was also exported to the Mexican market. It was later replaced by the Tiida.

While the previous generation Almera was considered spacious for its class, the N16 Almera was noted to be lacking in rear passenger legroom due to a slightly shorter than category average 2.53 metres (99.6 in) wheelbase.

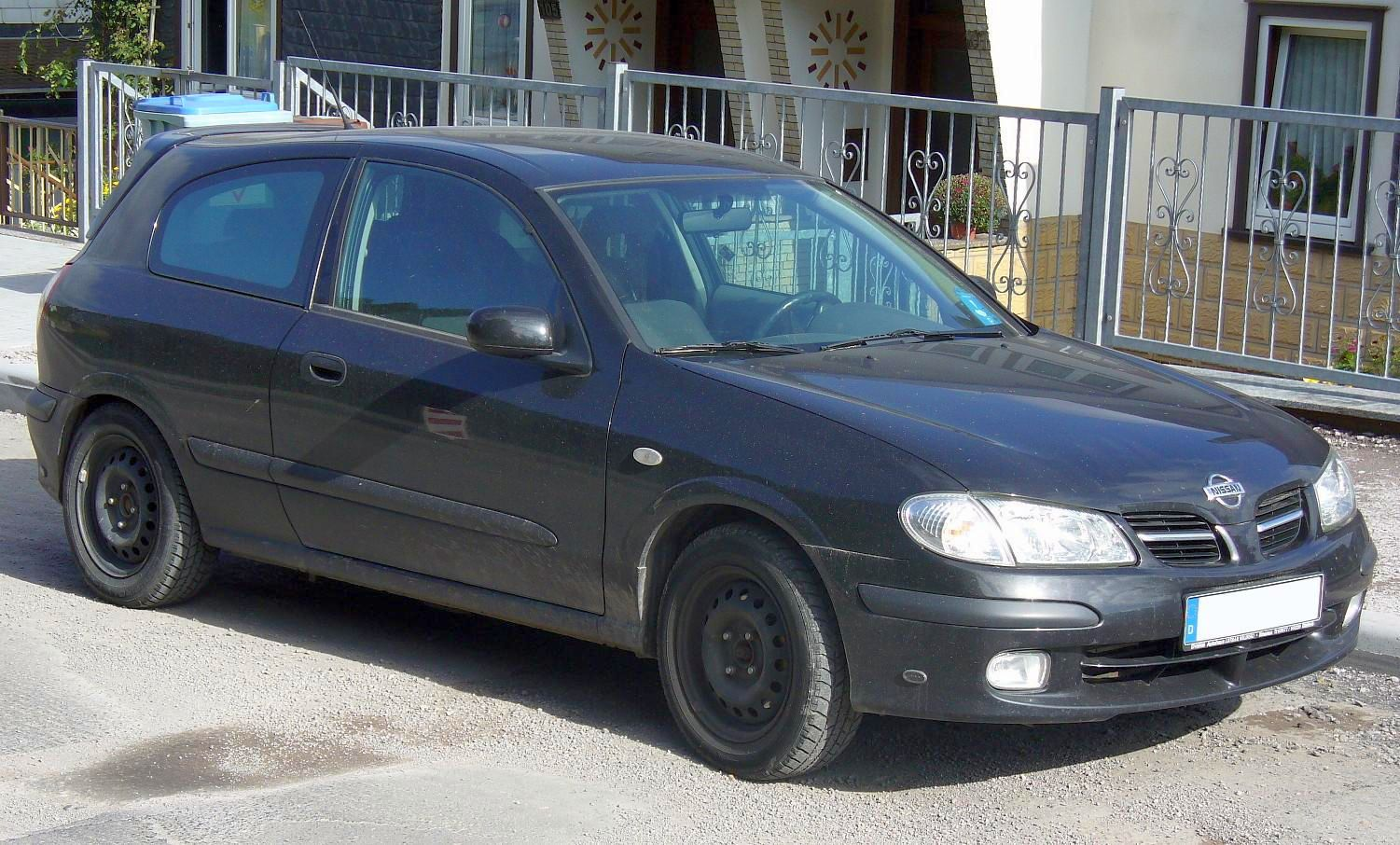
Nissan Almera 3-door (Germany; pre-facelift)

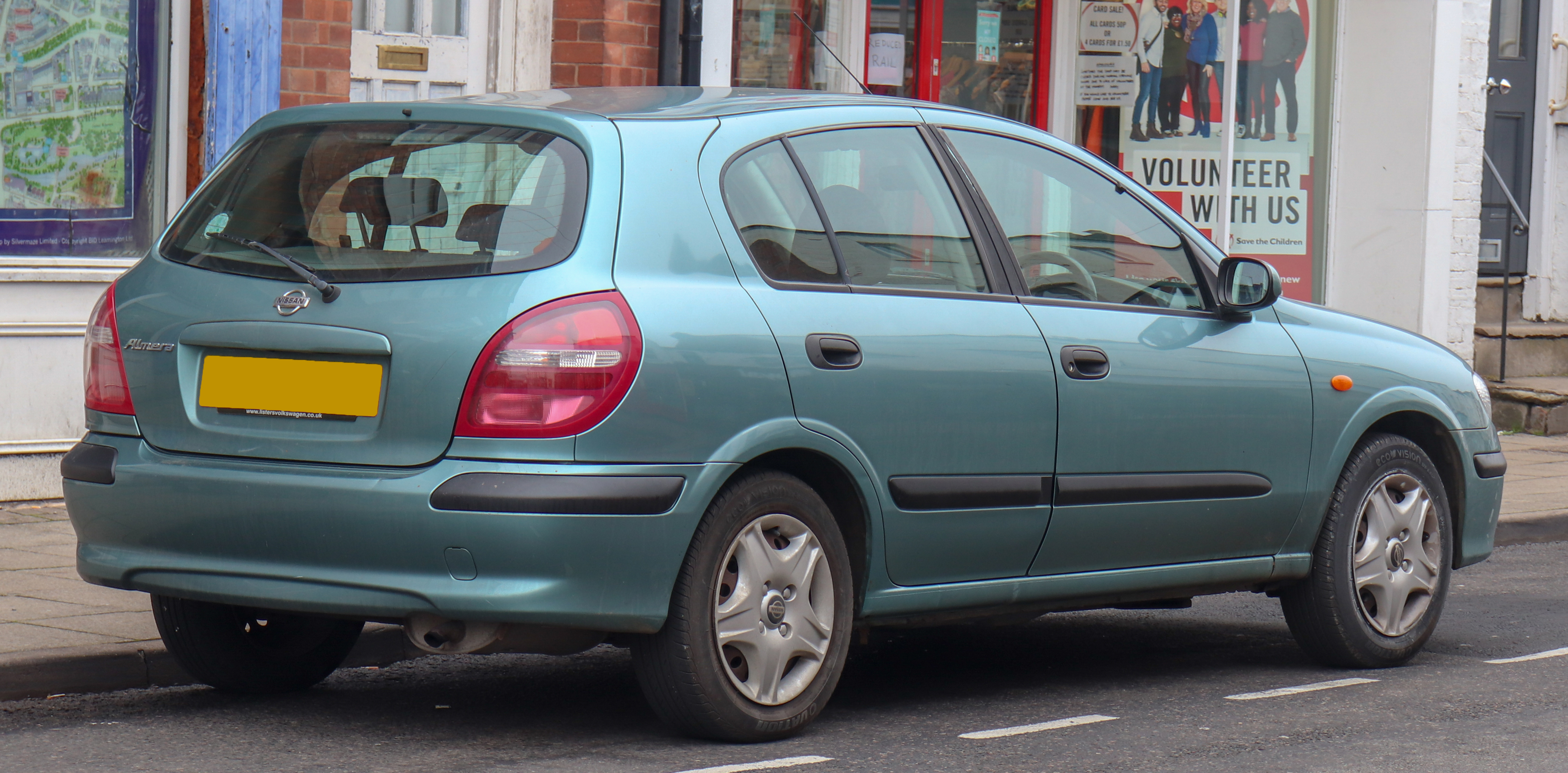
2003 Nissan Almera E 5-door (UK; pre-facelift)

=== Facelift ===
In 2003, the Almera received a facelift, which included updated styling, retuned suspension, new engines, and an upgraded interior.

First, the Almera's MacPherson strut front suspension and multi-link rear suspension (Nissan's name for its double lateral link twist beam suspension) had been retuned. This resulted in a quieter ride and a reduction in the amount of rear bump-through experienced when heavily laden, improving high-speed stability, driving dynamics, and making the car more controllable after an emergency maneuver. The new suspension tuning also proved to produce almost no body roll on tight turns. Overall, Nissan said, the Almera had slightly firmer damper settings and marginally stiffer spring ratings; though there had been no loss of ride comfort or increase in noise levels in normal motoring. The suspension revisions had been executed in such a way as to only become effective at the upper edge of the dynamic envelope.

The facelift also included new chrome, projector-style headlights that were set in a titanium-coloured surround with separate lights for main and low beams set behind an enlarged translucent cover. The front bumper had an integrated engine air intake that ran almost the full width of the car, while a honeycomb mesh grille added visual benefits to the frontal look. Some models also received small circular fog lights.

The interior of the facelifted Almera was redesigned with improved materials and featured a large centre display, available in colour or monochrome, which controlled various functions including climate control, the CD player, and the trip computer. This display was standard on most models, but excluded the S and Pulse trims. Higher-specification variants also offered Nissan's Birdview GPS navigation system. Electronic Stability Program (ESP) was fitted as standard on SE, SVE, and the range-topping SXE models, with the SXE also featuring a switch to manually enable or disable the system.

Additionally, there was a change to the diesel model lineup. Nissan introduced a new version of common rail 2.2 diesel with six-speed gearbox.

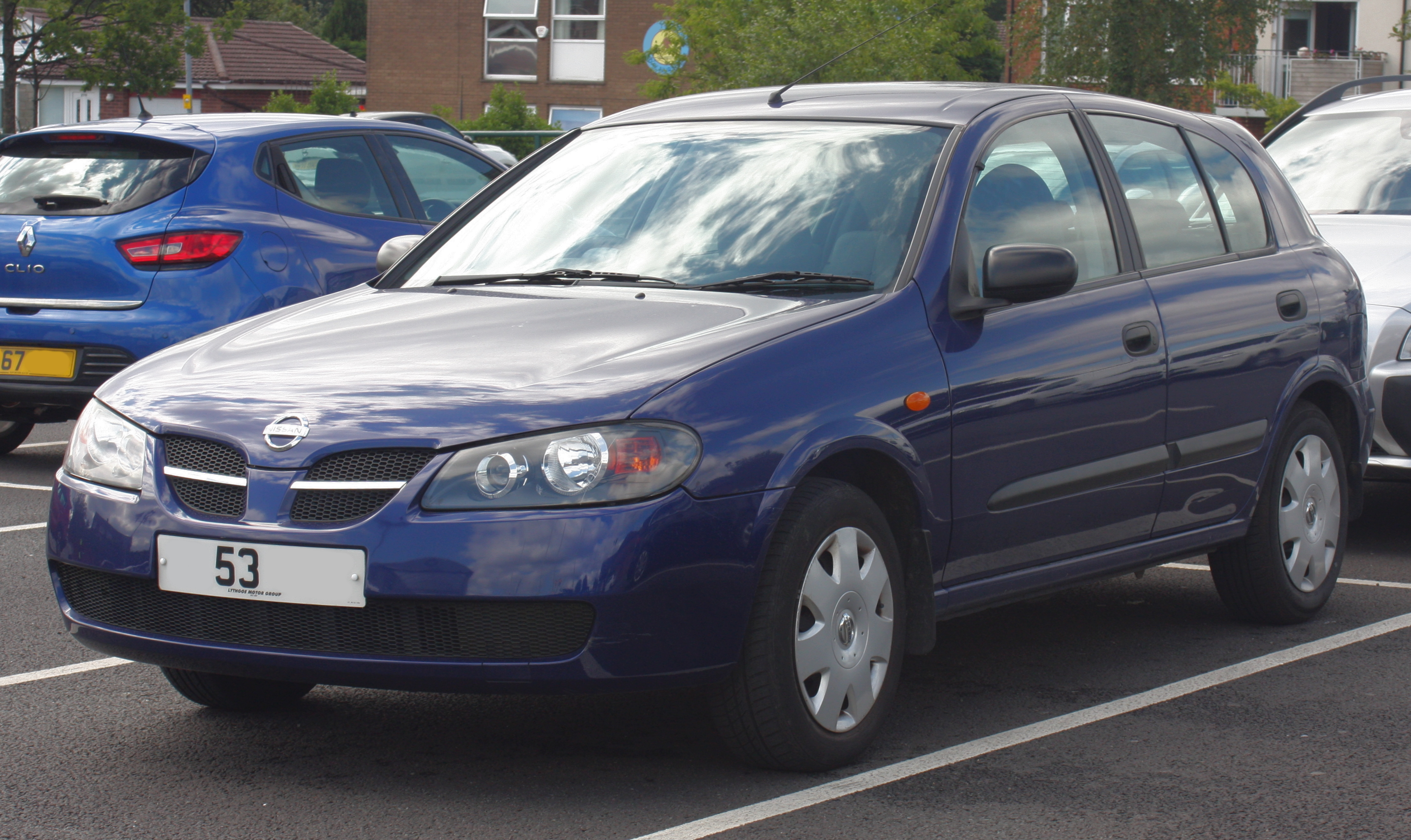
2003 Nissan Almera S 5-door (UK; facelift)

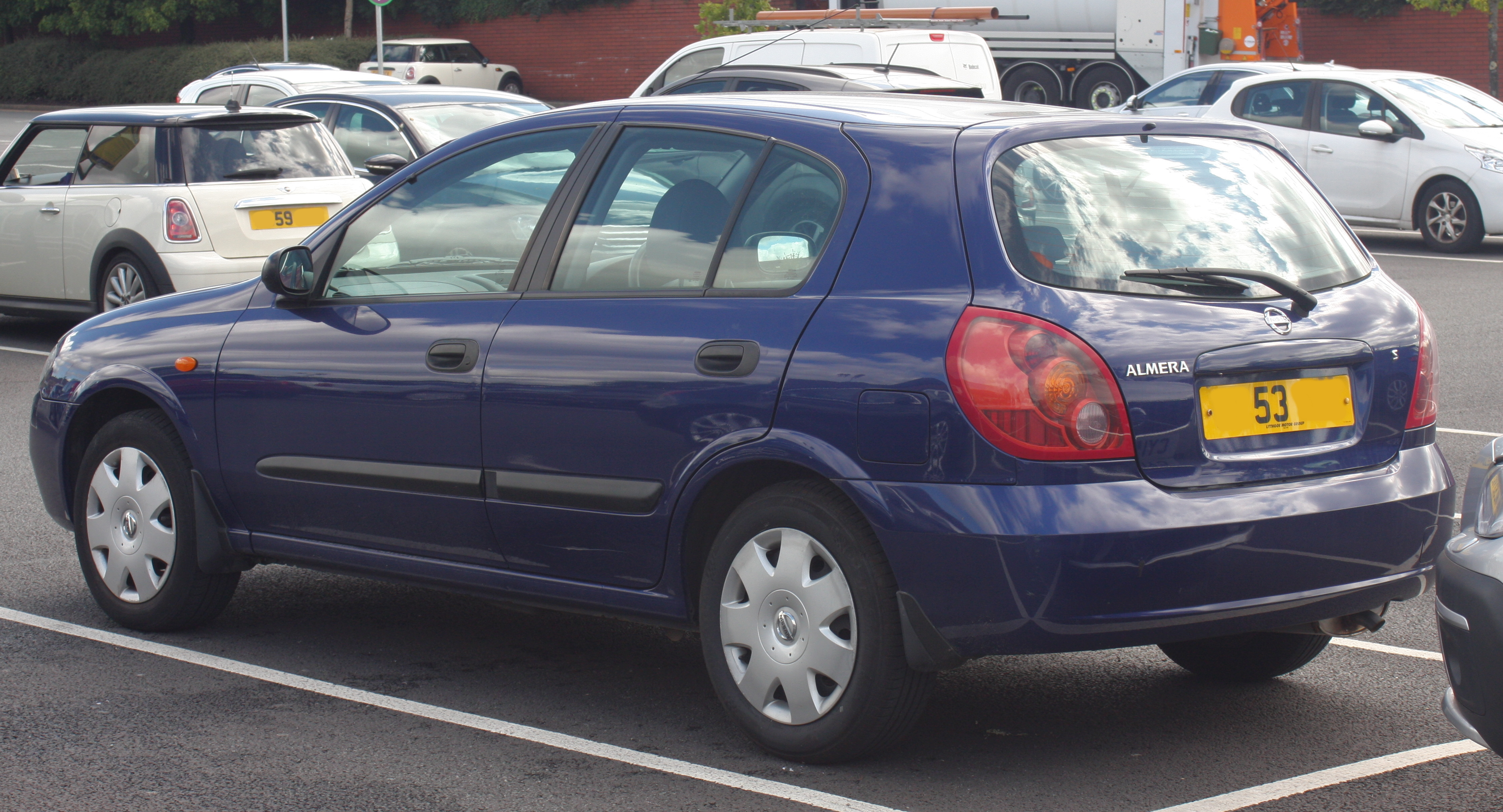
2003 Nissan Almera S 5-door (UK; facelift)

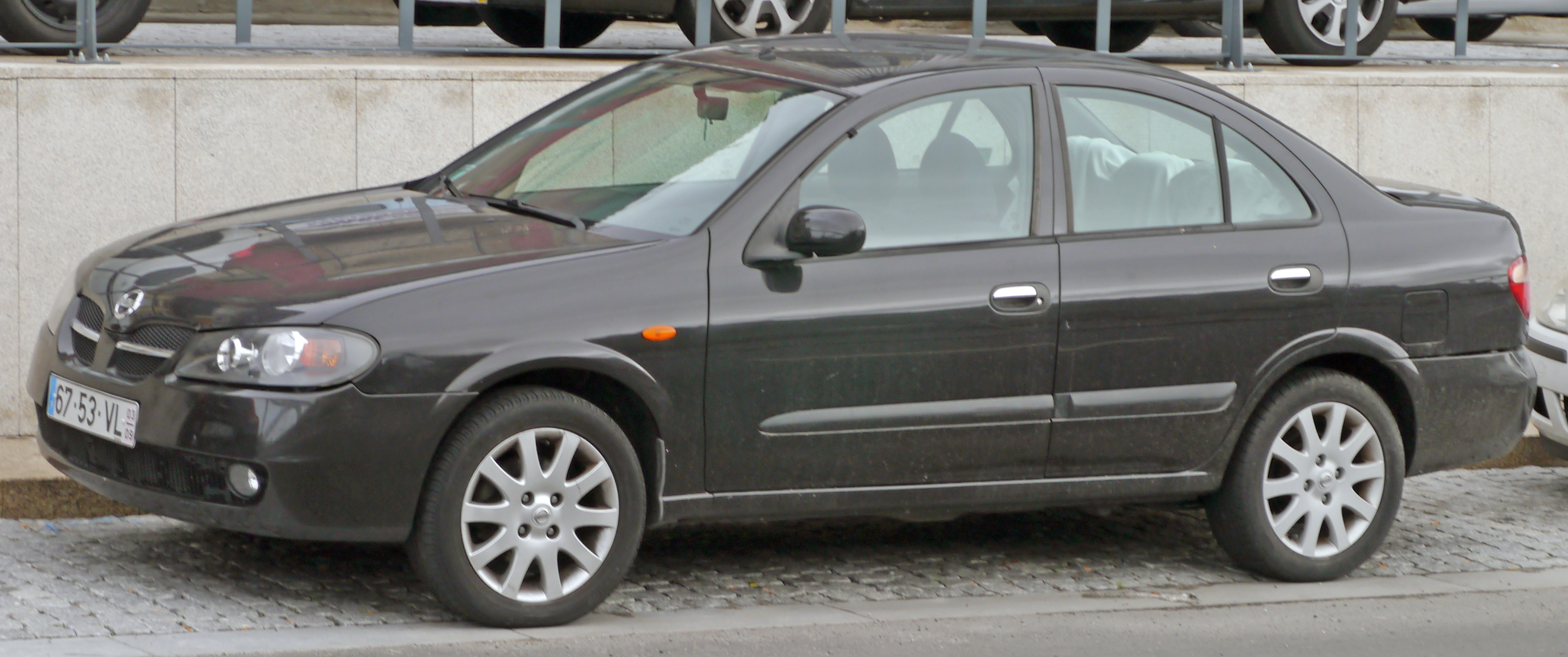
Nissan Almera saloon (France, facelift)

=== Production ===
The facelifted Almera was built in Sunderland, Tyne and Wear, UK, and exported to parts of the Asia-Pacific where it was sold as the Nissan Pulsar. In 2006, the second-generation Almera reached its sixth year of production but was still selling strongly worldwide.

The Almera finished production on 28 November 2007, but it was not instantly replaced. The Tiida was introduced in several countries as a replacement model throughout 2007 and 2008; although it wasn't officially imported to the United Kingdom, where the Qashqai crossover is the model generally considered to be its successor. It was available there through the Arnold Clark dealership network from March 2009 with models sourced from the Republic of Ireland. Several Almeras were registered in Ireland in 2008, despite production ending in 2007.

== Third generation (N17; 2011) ==
Third generation
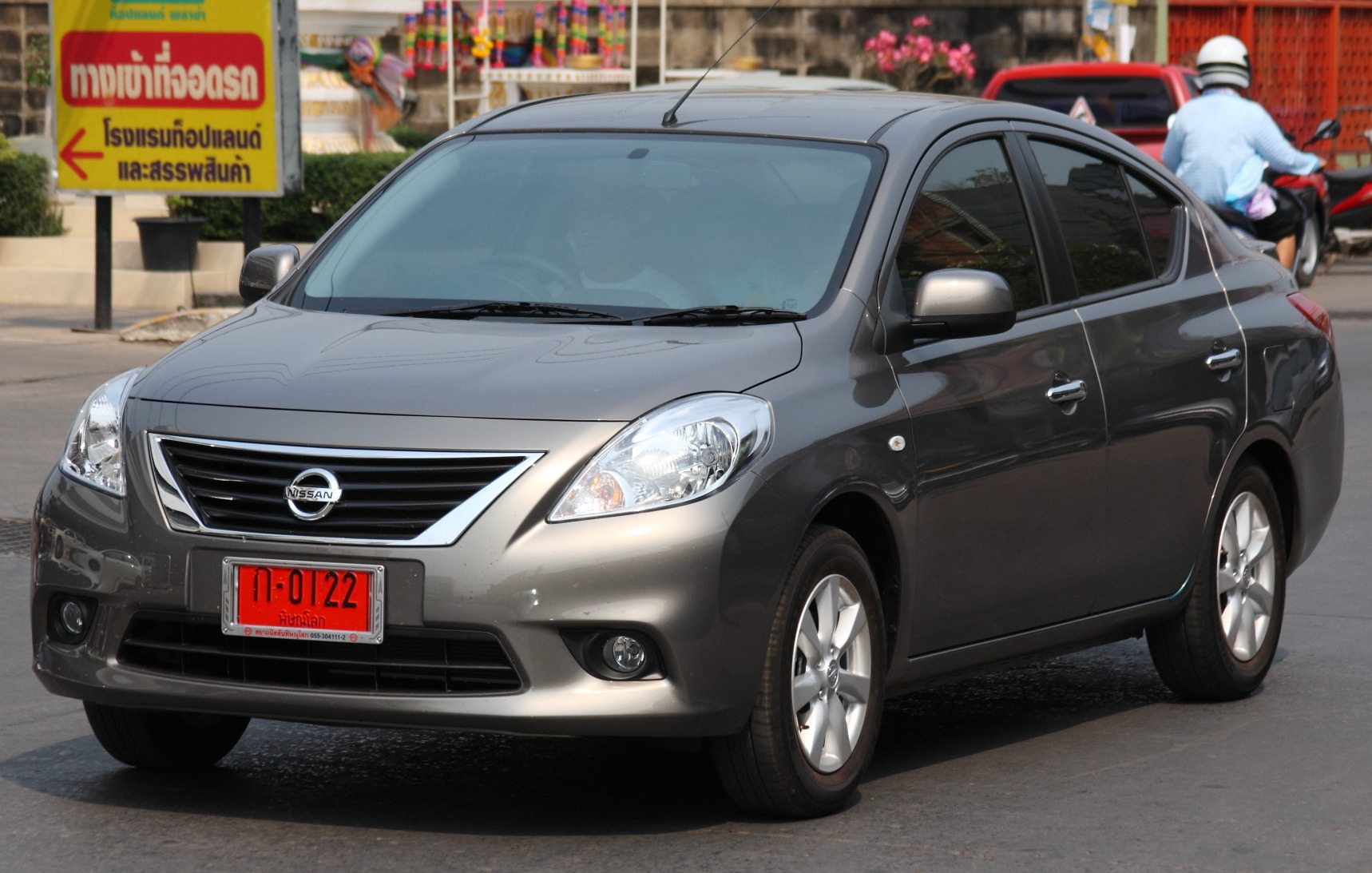
- 2012 Nissan Almera (Thailand, pre-facelift)

Overview
- Model code: N17
- Also called: Nissan Latio (Japan); Nissan Sunny; Nissan Versa (Americas); Nissan V-Drive (Latin America, 2019–2026); Renault Scala (India)
- Production: 2011–2025 (Mexico); 2011–2026; 2011–2019 (Thailand, China); 2011–2020 (India); 2013–2021 (Philippines, Vietnam); 2015–2021 (Brazil); 2012–present (Egypt); 2017–present (Myanmar); 2012–2017 (Renault Scala)
- Model years: 2012–2019 (North America); 2012-2025 (Mexico)
- Assembly: Thailand: Samut Prakan (Nissan Motor Thailand); China: Guangzhou (Dongfeng Nissan); India: Chennai (Renault Nissan India); Malaysia: Serendah (TCMA); Philippines: Santa Rosa, Laguna; Vietnam: Da Nang (TCIEV); Mexico: Cuernavaca, Aguascalientes (Nissan Mexicana, A1); Brazil: Resende, Rio de Janeiro; Myanmar: Bago (TCMM); Egypt: 6th of October

Body and chassis
- Body style: 4-door sedan
- Platform: Nissan V platform
- Related: Nissan Micra/March (K13); Nissan Note (E12)

Powertrain
- Engine: Gasoline/Petrol: 1.0 L HR10DE I3; 1.2 L HR12DE I3; 1.5 L HR15DE I4; 1.6 L HR16DE I4; Diesel: 1.5 L K9K I4
- Transmission: 4-speed RE4F03C automatic; 5-speed RS5F91R manual; RE0F11A Xtronic CVT

Dimensions
- Wheelbase: 2,600 mm (102.4 in)
- Length: 4,425 mm (174.2 in)
- Width: 1,695 mm (66.7 in)
- Height: 1,500 mm (59.1 in)
- Curb weight: 1,020 kg (2,249 lb)

Chronology
- Predecessor: Nissan Tiida (C11); Nissan Tsuru (Mexico); Nissan Aprio (Mexico)

The N17 Almera was first introduced in China at the Guangzhou Auto Show in December 2010, where it was marketed as the Nissan Sunny. It went on sale in January 2011. Based on the company's global V platform, the model was touted as a sedan for the global market, as it was gradually marketed across 170 countries with assemblies conducted in numerous American, African, and Asian countries.

In October 2011, Nissan debuted the model in Thailand as the Almera. It was positioned as an entry-level sedan for the Eco Car program in Thailand, which required a 1.2-litre engine to be adopted. The Almera name is also used for the model in Malaysia, the Philippines, Indonesia, Singapore, Australia, Ghana, Kenya, Mauritius, South Africa, and Nigeria.

In the Americas, it is badged as the Nissan Versa. It went on sale in North America in July 2011, and in Brazil in October 2011.

The Sunny nameplate is also used in India, Vietnam, and various Middle Eastern countries. The N17 Almera was also exported from Thailand to Japan since October 2012 until December 2016, where it was marketed as the Nissan Latio (Japanese: 日産・ラティオ, Hepburn: Nissan Ratio). Under the joint venture established with Renault, the model was also marketed as the Renault Scala in India between 2012 and 2017, featuring minor redesigns.

After the release of the succeeding N18 model, the N17 sedan continued to be produced in several countries. In India, since 2020 the vehicle is no longer sold in the country, instead it is solely produced for export to GCC countries as the Sunny Classic. The model is also continued to be produced in Mexico where it is marketed as the Nissan V-Drive since 2019 to distinguish it with the N18 Versa. The V-Drive nameplate was also used in Brazil for the same purpose until its end of production in the country in September 2021. In Malaysia, the model is also sold alongside its successor as the Almera Black Series. Production of the N17 Sunny ended in China since 2019 without any direct replacement.

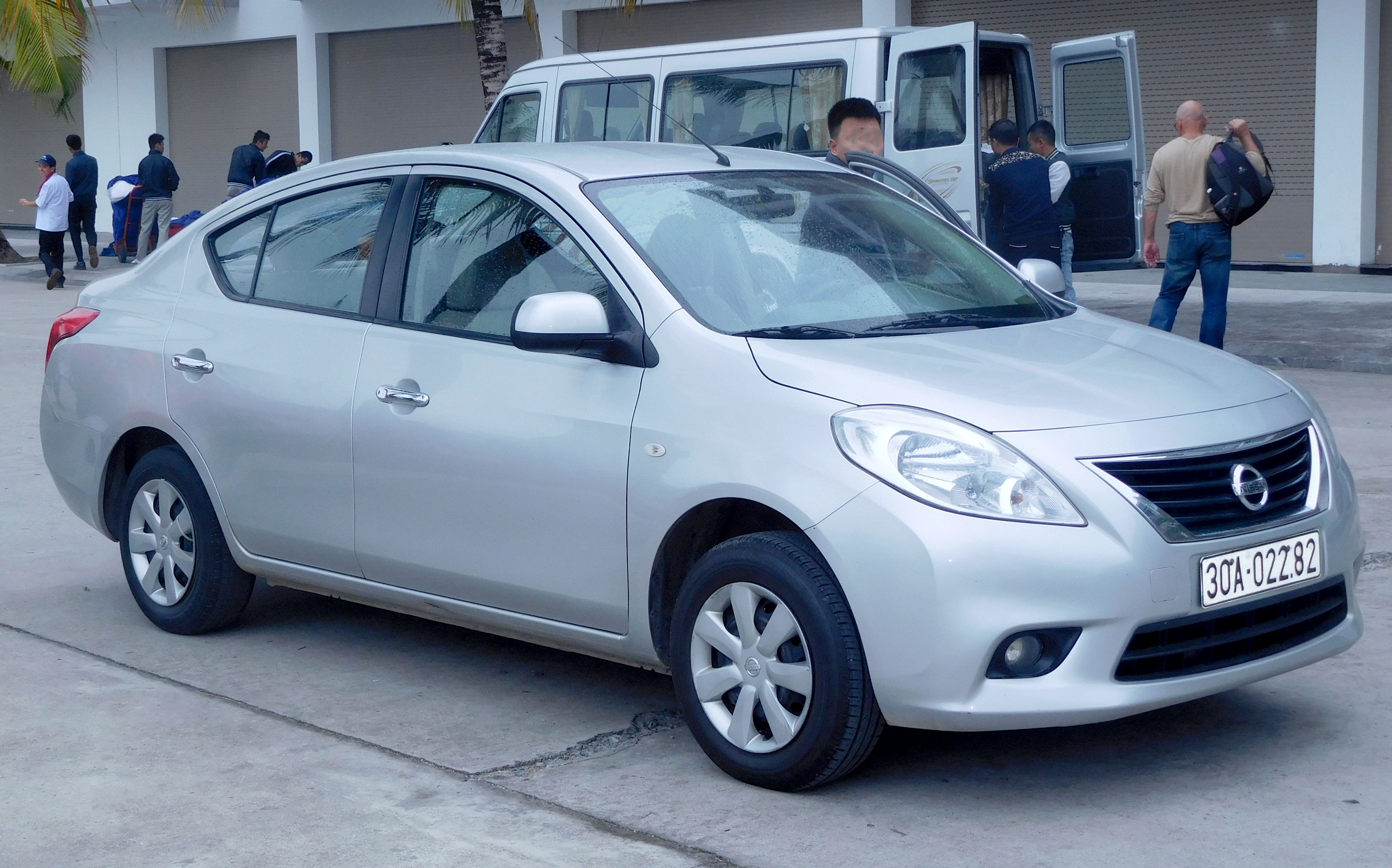
Nissan Sunny XL (Vietnam; pre-facelift)

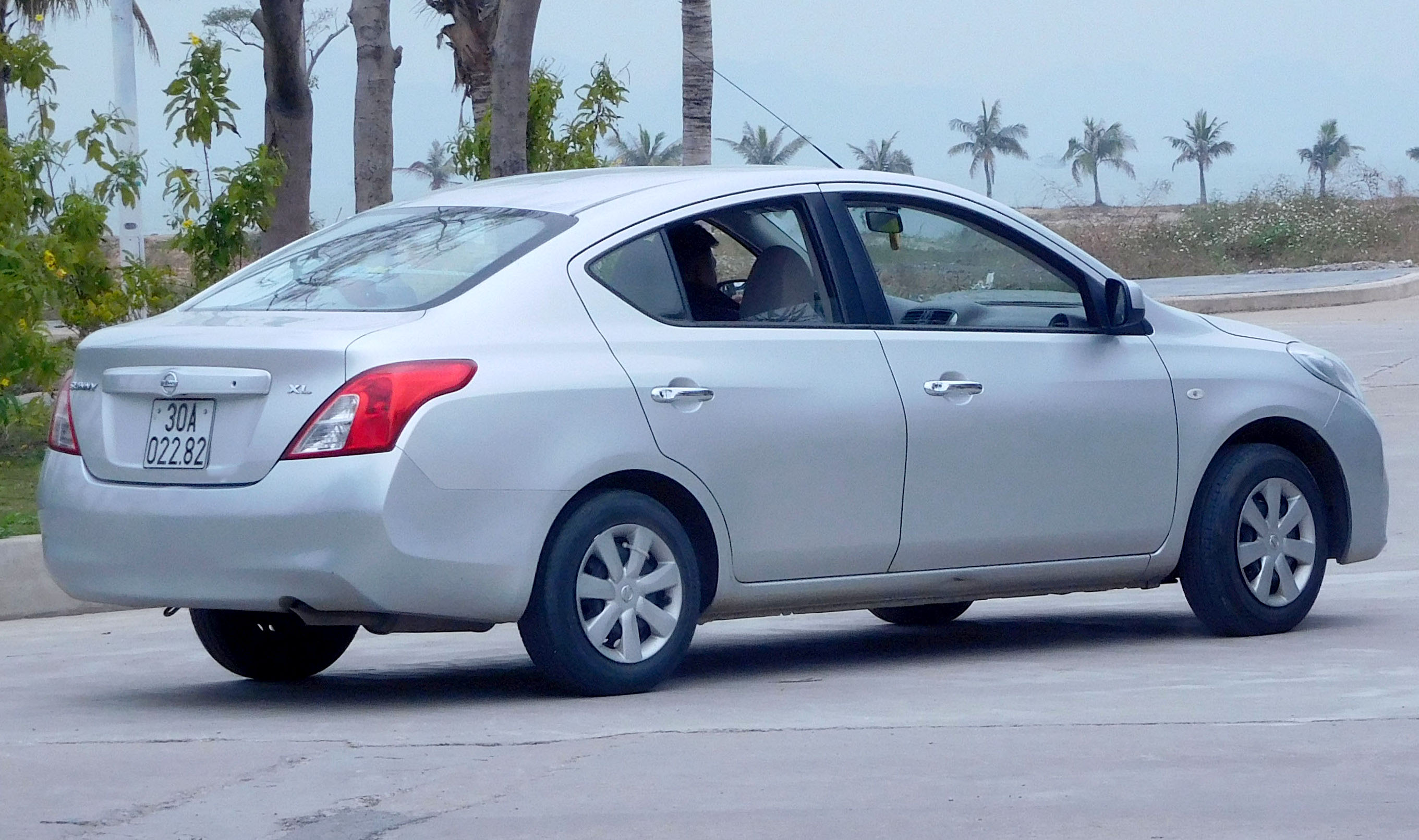
Nissan Sunny XL (Vietnam; pre-facelift)

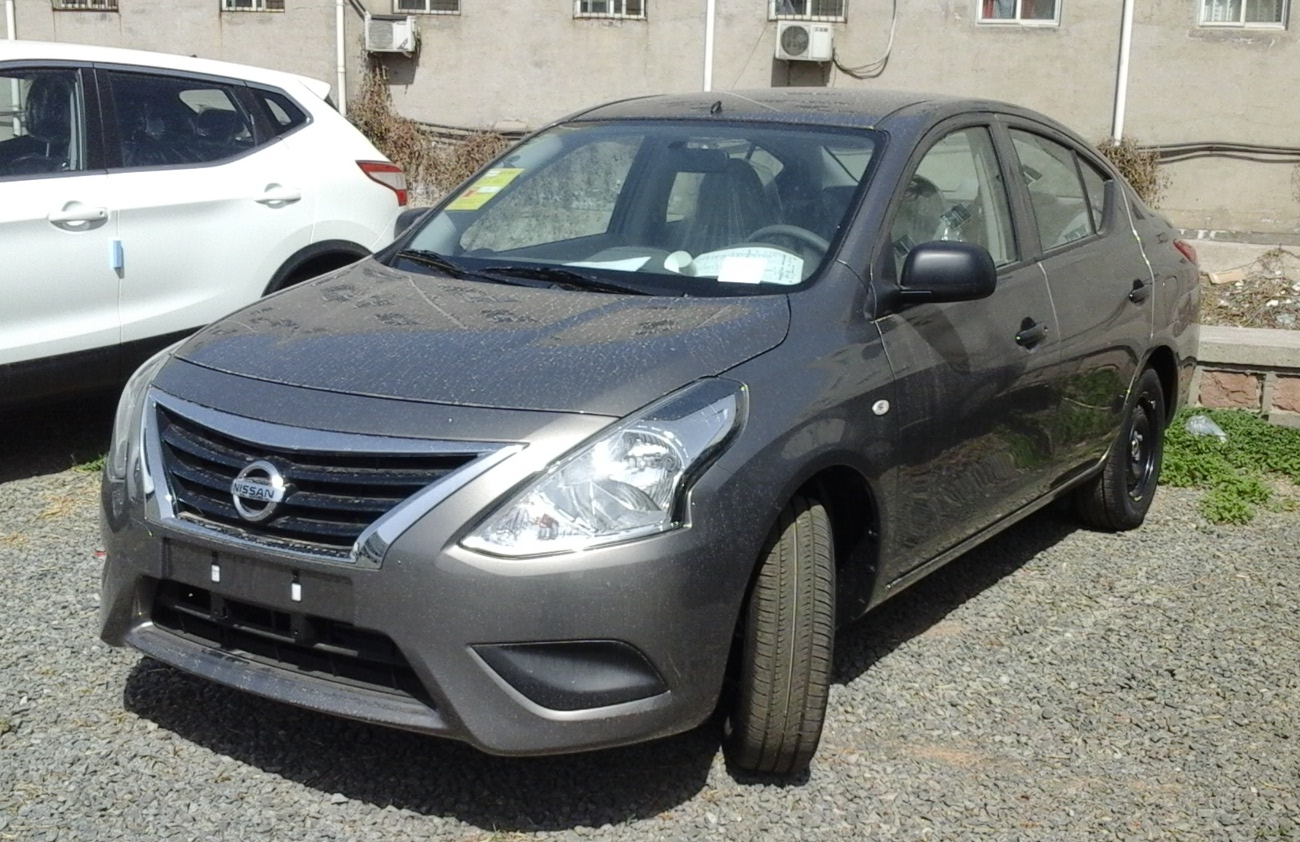
Nissan Sunny (China; facelift)

=== Markets ===
==== Japan ====
The Japanese-market model was released as the Nissan Latio on 5 October 2012. Its release was delayed due to power shortages in Japan caused by the 2011 Tōhoku earthquake and tsunami. Imported from Thailand, the Latio is equipped with a 1.2-litre engine producing 79 PS (58 kW) and 106 N⋅m (78 lb⋅ft). It was offered with three trim levels. The Latio was discontinued in Japan on 26 December 2016 due to poor sales.

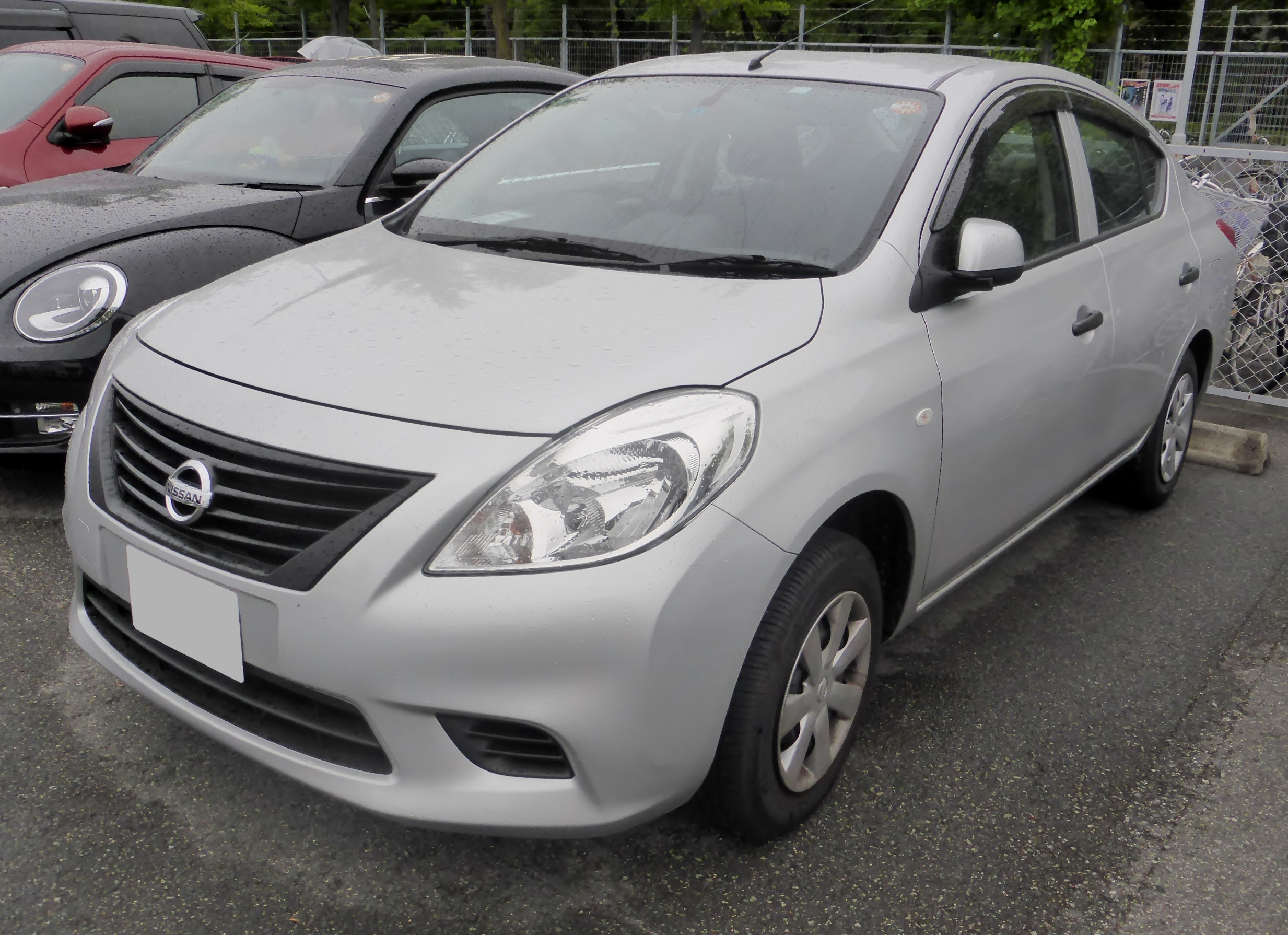
Nissan Latio B (Japan; pre-facelift)

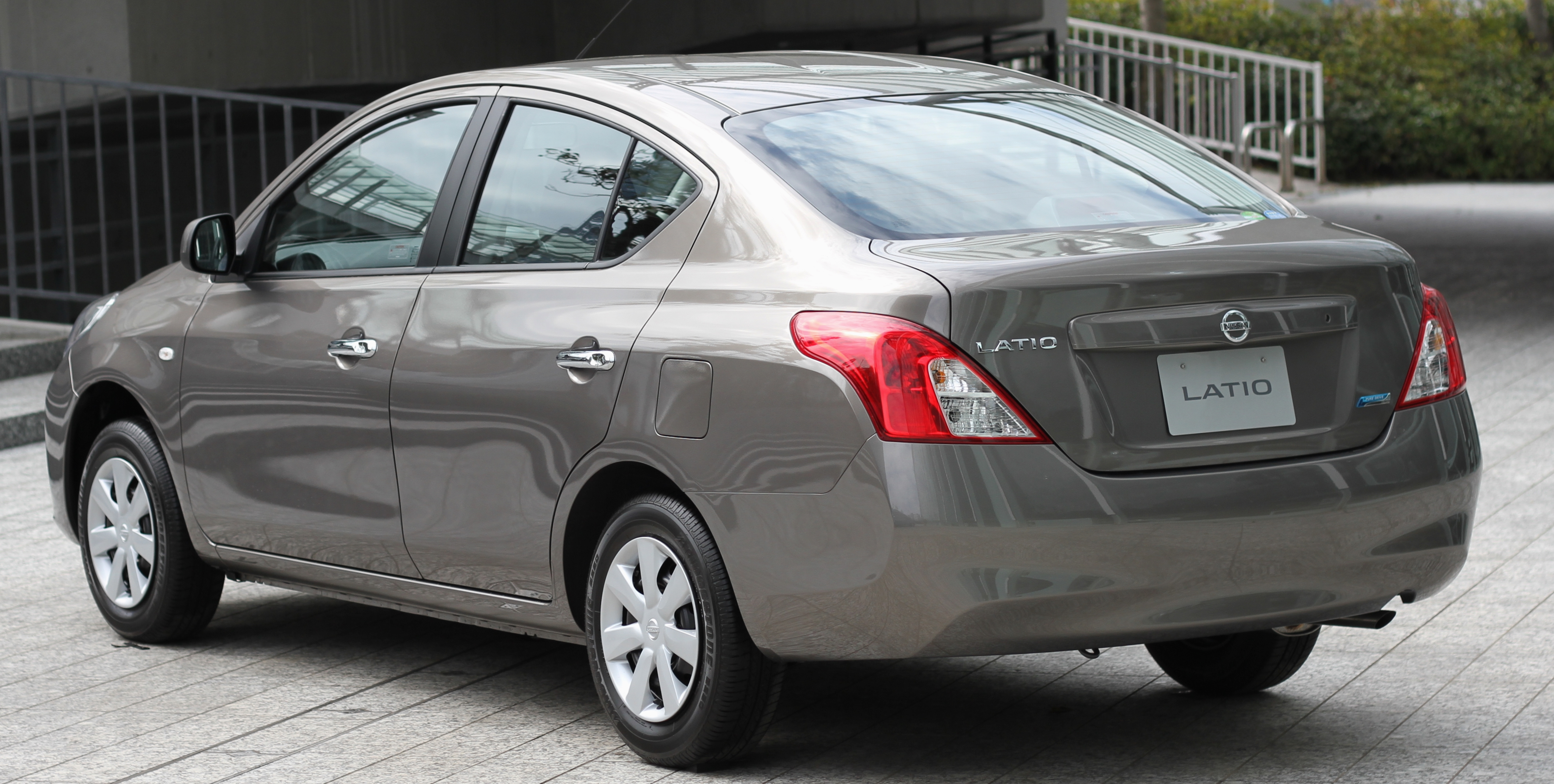
Nissan Latio X (Japan; pre-facelift)

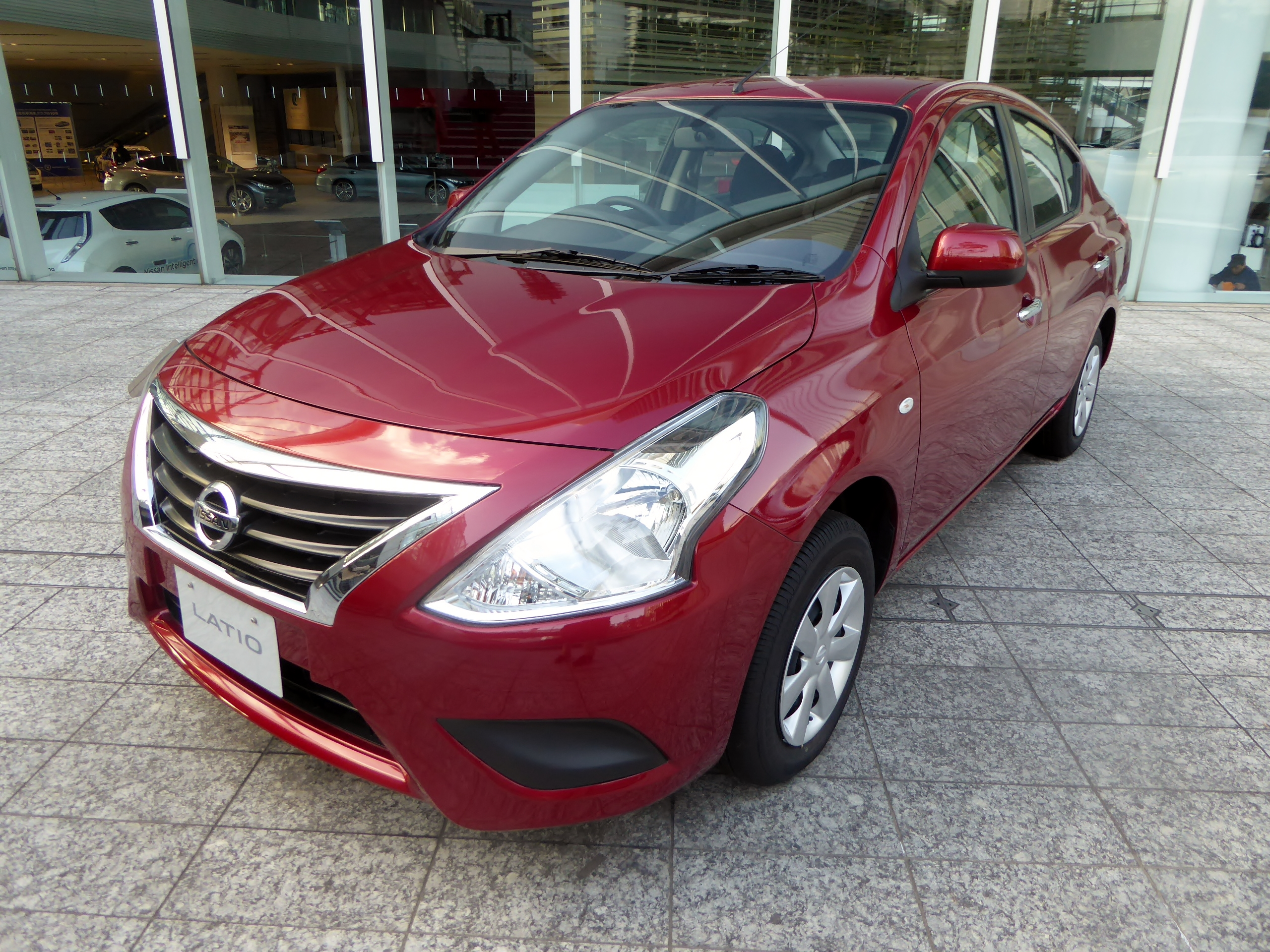
Nissan Latio X (Japan; facelift)

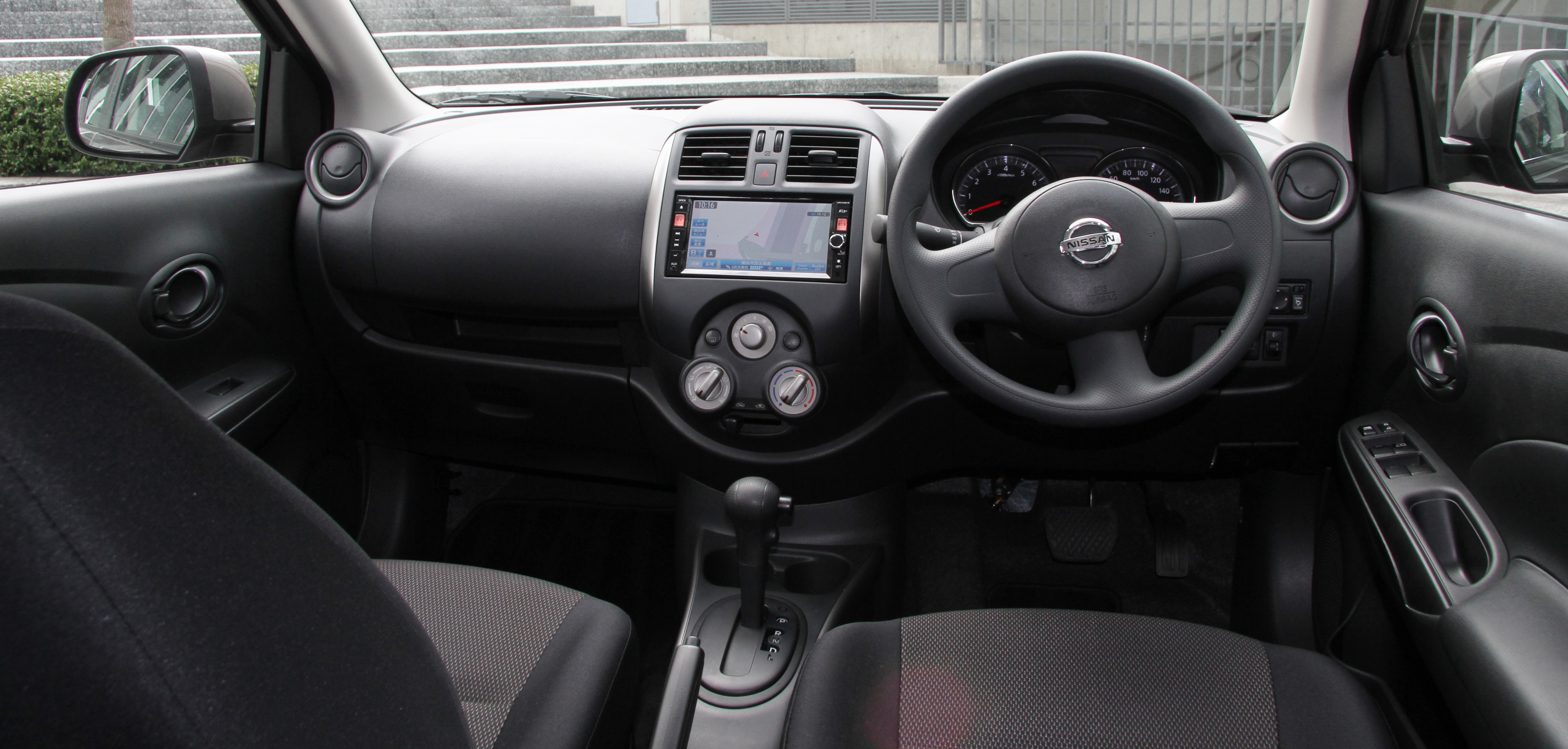
Nissan Latio X interior (pre-facelift)

==== Southeast Asia ====
The Thai-specification model was released as the Almera on 7 October 2011, as part of the Eco Car programme. It uses the same 1.2-litre HR12DE engine as the Nissan March, with a fuel consumption of 20 km/L (56 mpg_{‑imp}; 47 mpg_{‑US}), and either a five-speed manual or a continuously variable transmission (CVT).

In 2014, Nissan introduced a minor update for the Thai-market Almera, adding circular fog lights to the Model 2 variant to match specifications in other regions. Thailand also received the Sportech trim, which featured LED fog lights, a rear spoiler (shared with the base model), and a modified HR12DE engine with a "SPORTECH" mode for improved acceleration.

=== Regional variations ===
==== Philippines ====
The Almera was assembled in Santa Rosa, Laguna, for the Philippine market, from 2013 to 2021.

==== Malaysia and Singapore ====
These markets received the Almera with a 1.5-litre HR15DE engine, paired with either a four-speed automatic or a five-speed manual transmission.

==== Indonesia ====
In Indonesia, the Almera was used exclusively as a taxi fleet vehicle and was not sold to private buyers, due to low demand for supermini sedans in the country.

==== Malaysia-specific details ====
The Almera was launched in Malaysia in October 2012, with three variants: E (manual or automatic), V (automatic only), VL (automatic only). All variants were powered by the 1.5-litre HR15DE engine.

A facelifted N17 Almera was launched in Malaysia in January 2015, featuring styling updates and an optional Nismo performance package.

==== India ====
In India, the vehicle was marketed as the Sunny and was introduced in September 2011. Renault marketed a modified version as the Renault Scala, which was launched in August 2012. It was discontinued in May 2020, alongside the Micra supermini due to both cars not being compliant with India's Bharat Stage VI emissions standards. Production continues for exports, mostly to GCC markets.

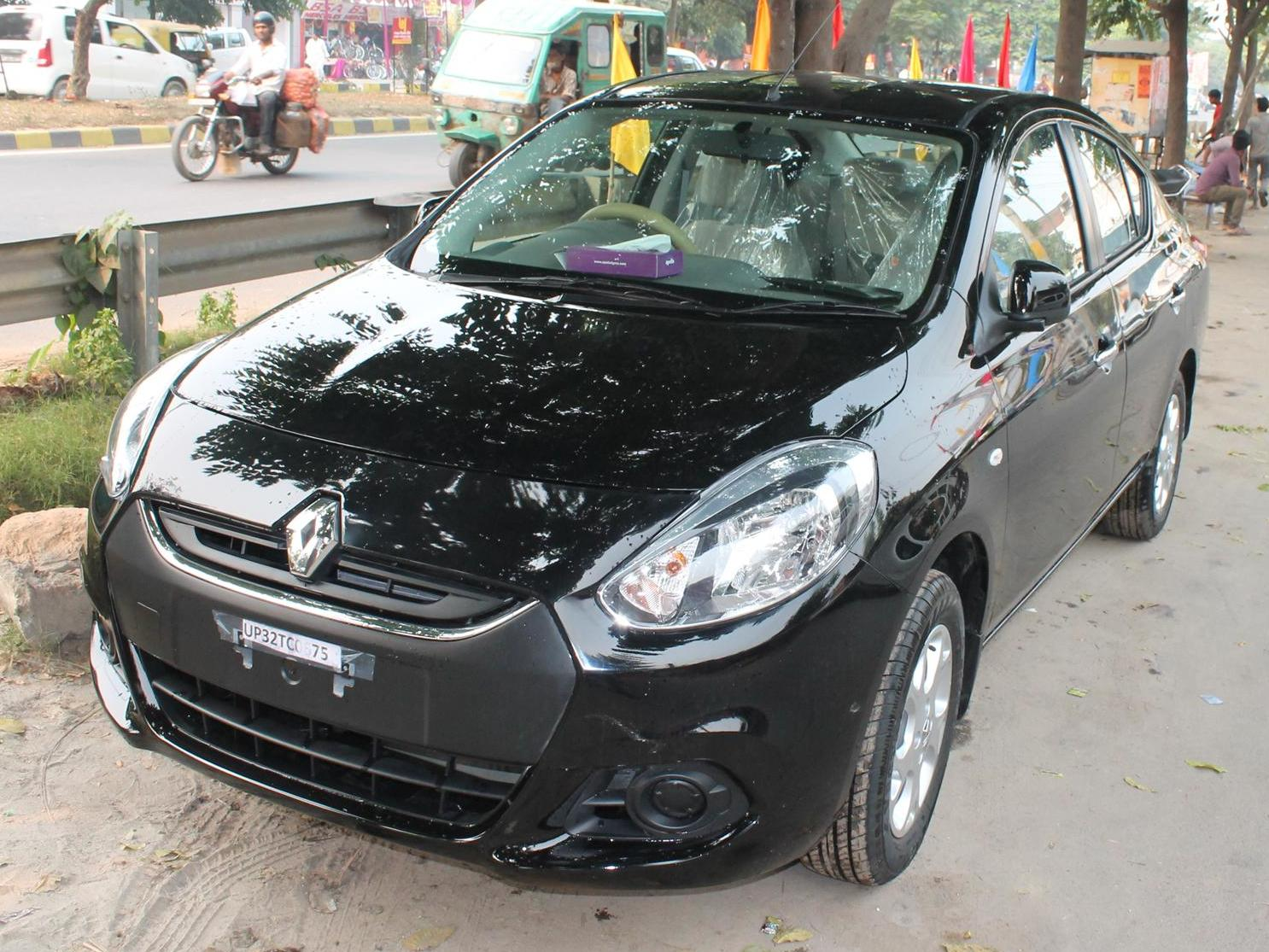
Renault Scala (India)

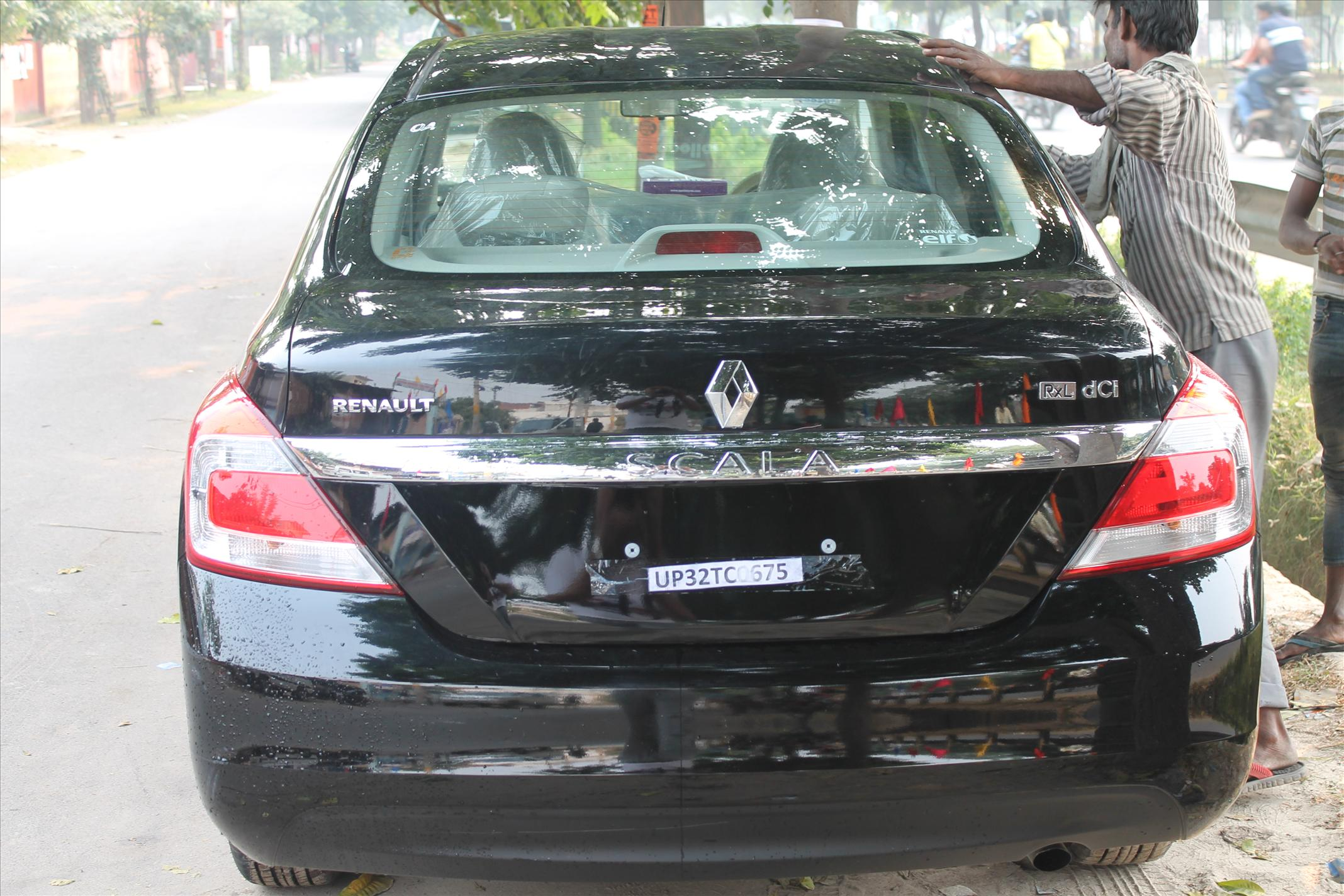
Rear view

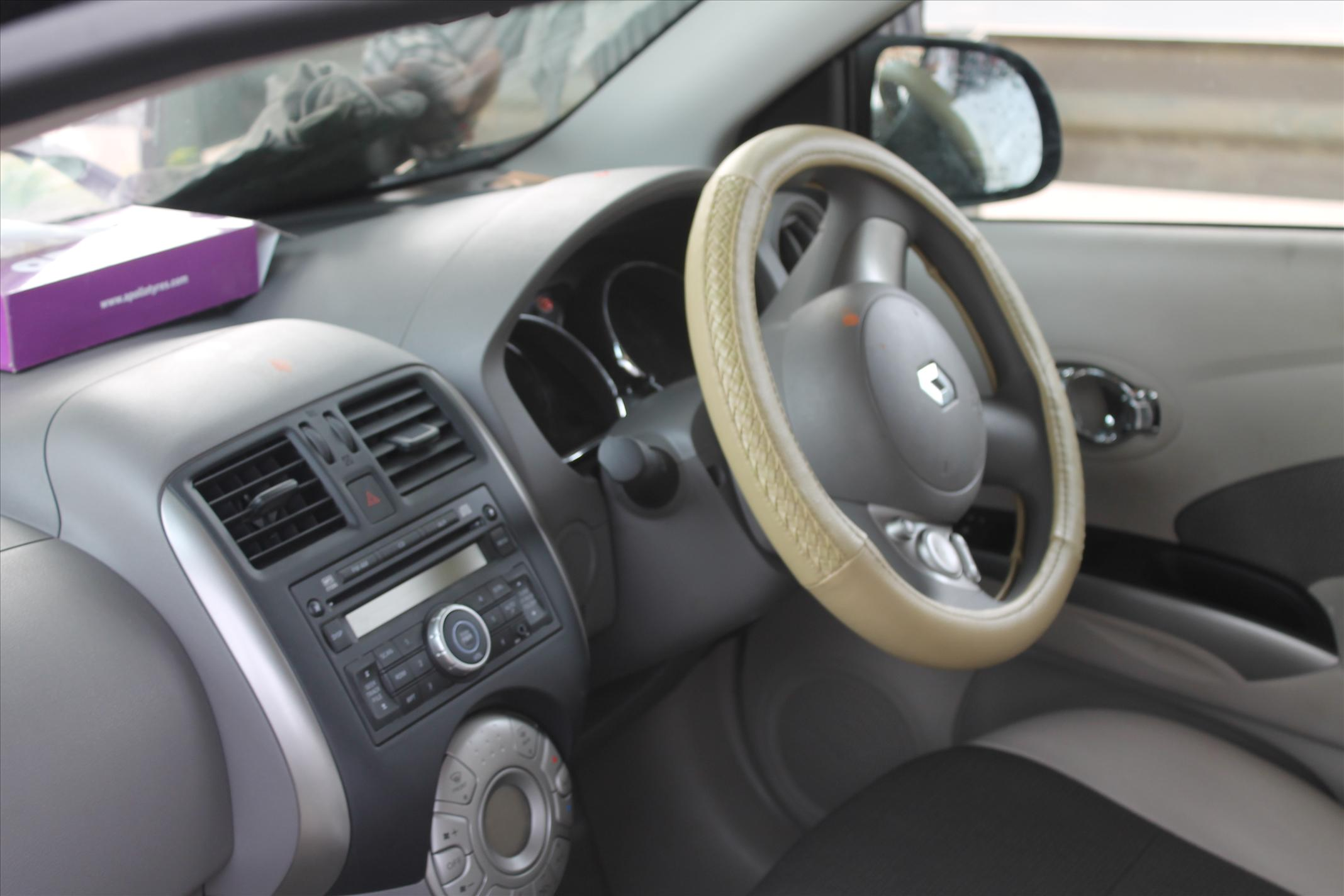
Interior

==== Australia ====
The Australian model was released as the Almera in August 2012. The model range is powered by a 1.5-litre petrol straight-four engine. Overall sales were low, with a high proportion of those sales belonging to fleet and rental car buyers. Nissan Australia discontinued the Almera in July 2014. Trim levels available were the entry-level ST with a five-speed manual or optional four-speed automatic and the automatic-only TI specification.

==== South Africa ====
The Almera was launched in South Africa in August 2013. The car was sold only in Acenta trim and powered by a 1.5-litre petrol straight-four engine, with either a 5 speed manual or 4 speed automatic gearbox, priced at R165 000 and R175 000 respectively. The Almera was imported from India and replaced the domestically-built Grand Livina and Tiida models. The car was face lifted in September 2014, with prices increasing to R177 600 for the manual version and R189 100 for the automatic. The Almera continued to be sold in South Africa until 2023 when imports from India ended, leaving only run-out units on sale and Nissan without a sedan in its South African line-up. The final units were priced at R291 900 for the manual and R310 000 for the automatic.

==== Americas ====
The US-spec model was unveiled at the 2011 New York International Auto Show as the second generation Nissan Versa. It is powered by a 1.6-liter gasoline engine that delivers around 80 kW (107 bhp) of power and 145 newton-metres (107 lb⋅ft) of torque. The fuel economy is estimated to be 30 mpg_{‑US} (8 L/100 km; 36 mpg_{‑imp}) city and 38 mpg_{‑US} (6 L/100 km; 46 mpg_{‑imp}) highway with the CVT-equipped model. In the US, the Versa sedan went on sale in August 2011. It was considered to be the least-expensive new car in the US market in 2013.

For the 2015 model year, the Versa received its facelift, with redesigned tail lights and larger headlights. The model was also sold in Latin America as the Versa, also with a 1.6-litre gasoline engine.

It was succeeded by the Nissan Micra K13 in 2014 for the Canadian market; the Versa was discontinued there due to slow sales.

In 2016, the Versa was positioned as the replacement of the discontinued Nissan Sunny B13 (known locally as Tsuru). As the result, the Versa became in 2017 the best-selling car in Mexico. In Mexico and Latin America, the N17 Versa was renamed as V-Drive since 2019 to avoid confusion with the new generation Versa launched in October 2019, dropping the Sense and Advance trim lines.

On 25 August 2021, the V-Drive was updated for the Mexican market, incorporating six airbags and stability control as standard. Later models used American specification headlights and taillights.

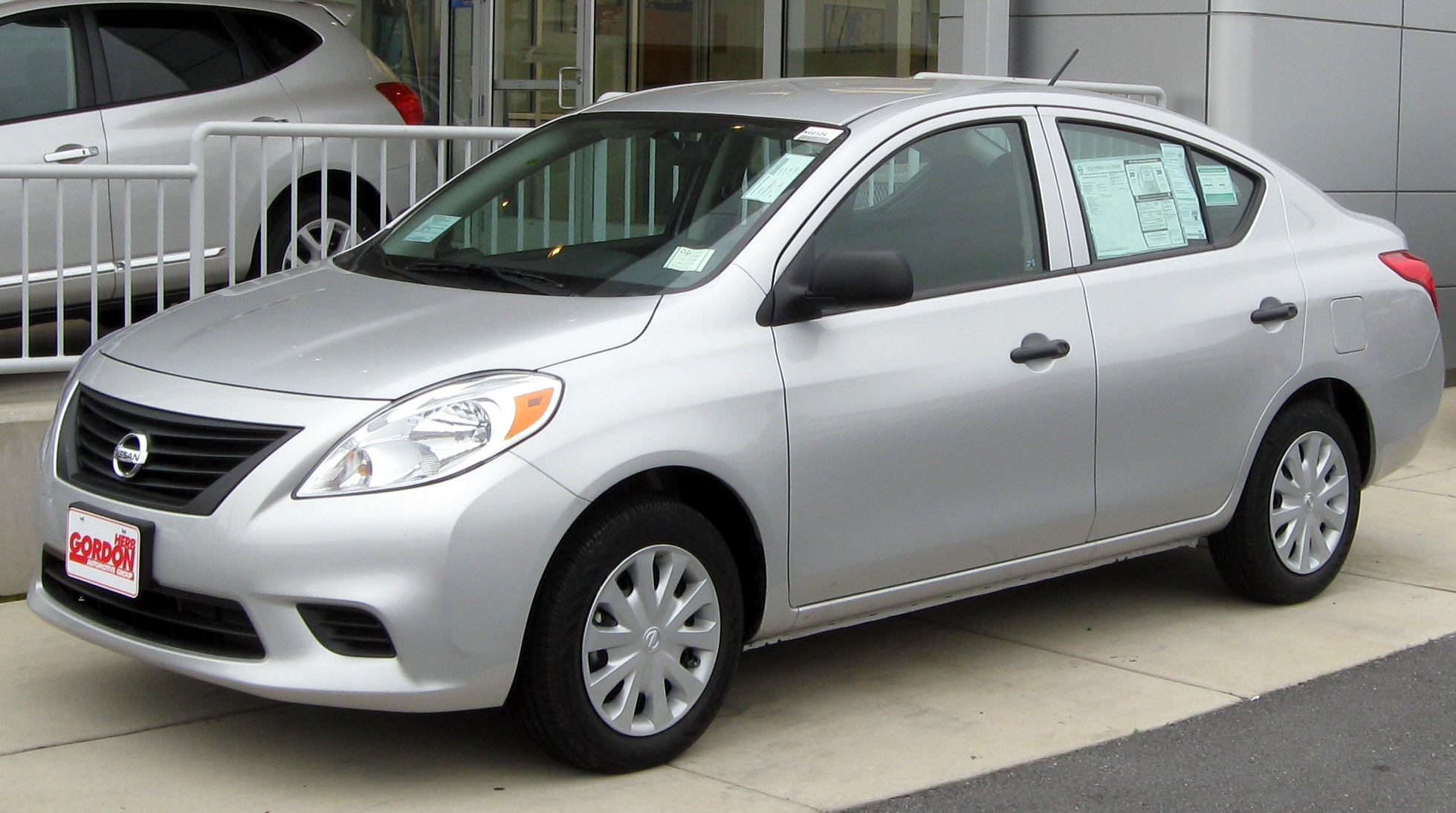
2012 Nissan Versa S (US; pre-facelift)

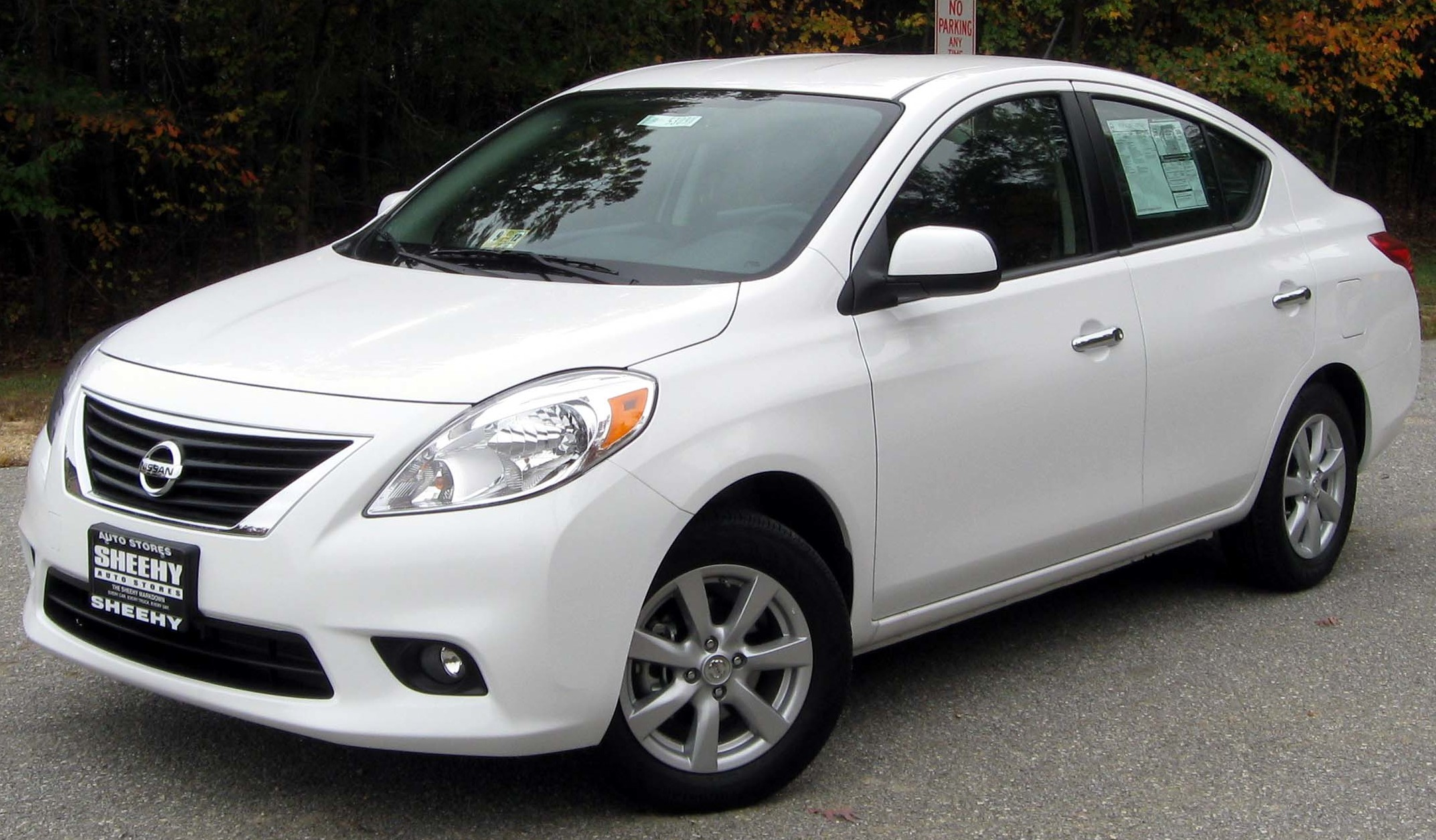
2012 Nissan Versa SL (US; pre-facelift)

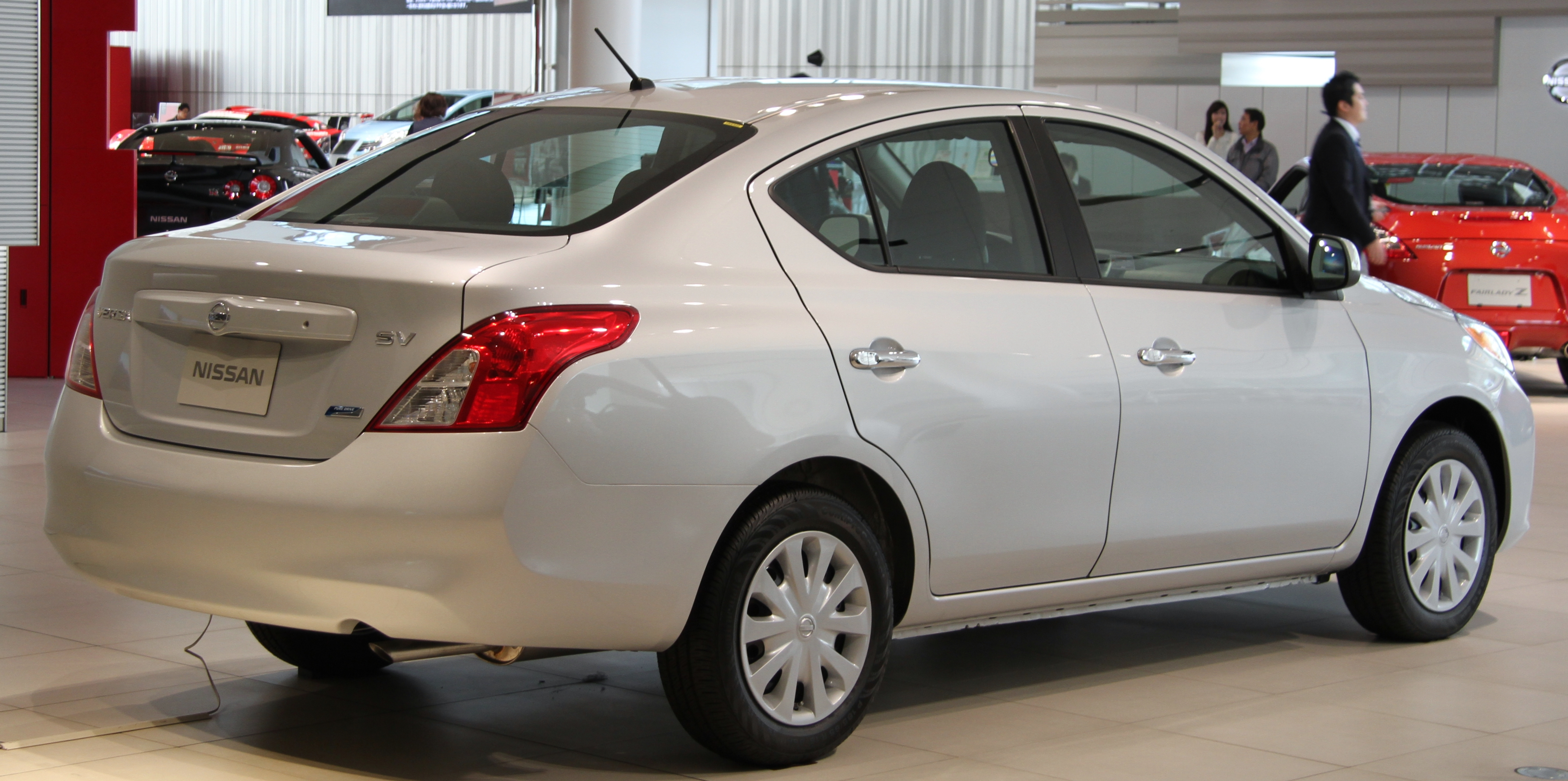
Rear view (US; pre-facelift)

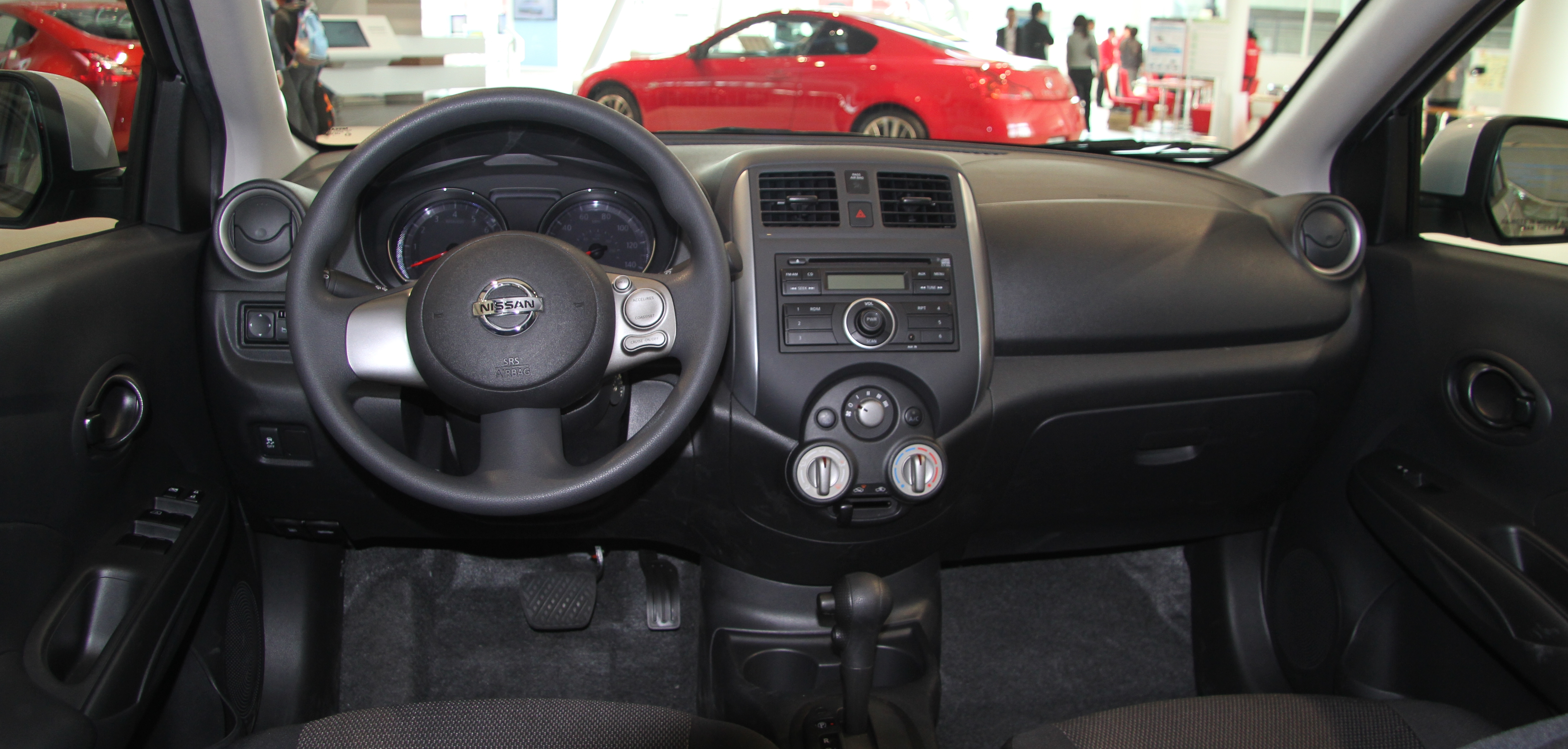
Nissan Versa interior (US; pre-facelift)

===== U.S. Versa annual changes, 2012–2019 =====
====== 2012 ======
Models available are the S (five-speed manual or CVT transmission offered), SV (CVT only) and SL (CVT only). All are powered by the HR16DE 1.6 engine. For this first year, only the SL can be had with a split-folding rear seat. Calendar-year sales in the U.S. reached 113,327 units.

====== 2013 ======
Enhancements are made to CVT-equipped models (low-rolling resistance tires, air intake guide, rear spoiler and air deflectors) allowing cars so equipped to reach 40 miles per gallon in highway driving. A four-speed automatic transmission became available for the base S sedan; the previous S with CVT is renamed the S Plus, and adds standard cruise control. New features are added to SV and SL models. Billed as America's best-selling entry sedan, Nissan sold 117,352 Versas for calendar 2013.

====== 2014 ======
Trim upgrades for SV and SL models are made for the 2014 model year. Several new features are added to those models as well.

====== 2015 ======
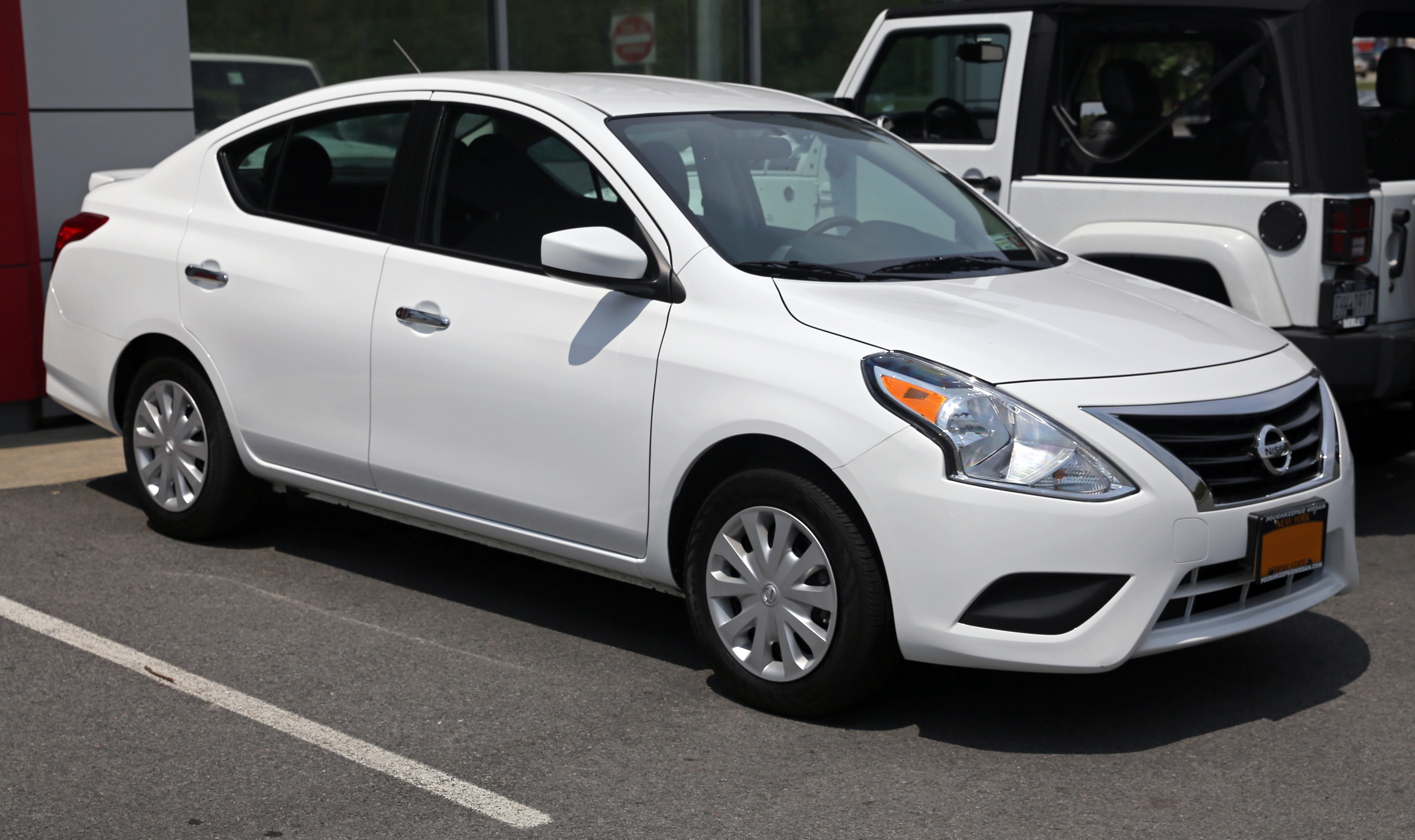
2015 Nissan Versa SV (US; facelift)

The 2015 model featured an updated exterior appearance and interior enhancements, along with more new features. Bluetooth phone connectivity became standard across the board. Nissan sold 144,528 Versas in the U.S. for calendar year 2015, a 3.4% increase over 2014.

====== 2016 ======
S sedans receive rear stereo speakers, having previously only had front door speakers. Additionally, body-colored exterior mirrors became standard on all models, and the SL gained a leather-wrapped steering wheel. For calendar year 2016, Nissan sold 132,214 Versas in the U.S., down 8.5% from 2015.

====== 2017 ======
The SV Special Edition package was made available, and adds 15-inch alloy wheels, fog lights, leather-wrapped steering wheel, upgraded audio system with five-inch colour display, SiriusXM satellite radio, Bluetooth streaming audio, hands-free text messaging assistant and backup camera, among other features. After the beginning of the model year, the 4-speed automatic transmission option was removed from the S (base) sedan. For the first time since its 2012 introduction, Versa U.S. sales fell in 2017, to 106,772 units; a 19.2% decrease from 2016 levels.

====== 2018 ======
The SL model, pushbutton start and Sandstone interior color are discontinued. Only minor changes are made to the remaining S, S Plus and SV. The SV Special Edition package becomes the top-of-the-line. All trims became equipped with adjustable front seat head restraints and variable-speed intermittent windshield wipers. In mid-model-year, the "2018.5" Versas – all models - added a 7-inch touchscreen stereo head unit and rear-view monitor as standard equipment. The new system included streaming Bluetooth audio, Siri Eyes Free, and USB/Aux inputs on S and S Plus models. Through August 2018, U.S. Versa sales had reached 54,301, a 23.8% drop from 2017.

====== 2019 ======
Nissan's Intelligent Key (pushbutton starting) system returns, became as part of the SV Special Edition package, which also added to its stereo system NissanConnect, Apple CarPlay and Android Auto, SiriusXM Satellite Radio, Bluetooth hands-free phone and text messaging.

=== Safety ===
Depending on regions, the N17 model can be equipped with up to six airbags.

==== ASEAN NCAP ====
ASEAN NCAP test results Nissan Almera (2013)
Test	Points	Stars
Adult occupant:	12.74	4 /5 stars
Child occupant:	52%	0 /5 stars
Safety assist:	NA	

==== IIHS ====
The Versa was tested by the IIHS using 2012 (winning a Top Safety Pick award), 2014, 2016 and 2019 models:

IIHS scores
Small overlap front (Driver)	Poor
Moderate overlap front	Good
Side (original test)	Good
Roof strength	Good
Head restraints and seats	Good
Child seat anchors (LATCH) ease of use	Acceptable

==== Latin NCAP ====
The Versa in its most basic Latin American market configuration with 2 airbags and no ESC received 3 stars for adult occupants and 2 stars for toddlers from Latin NCAP 1.0 in 2016.

Latin NCAP 2.0 test results Nissan Versa + 2 Airbags (2016, based on Euro NCAP 2008)
Test	Points	Stars
Adult occupant:	8.64/34.0	3 /5 stars
Child occupant:	18.22/49.00	2 /5 stars

==== National Highway Traffic Safety Administration ====
The 2014 model US Versa model received an overall 4 star safety rating from the National Highway Traffic Safety Administration.

==== Global NCAP ====
The South African version of the Almera with 2 airbags was tested in 2021 and received 3 stars for adults and 3 stars for children from Global NCAP 1.0 (based on Latin NCAP 2013).

Global NCAP 1.0 test results (South Africa) Nissan Almera – 2 Airbags (2021, similar to Latin NCAP 2013)
Test	Score	Stars
Adult occupant protection	8.06/17.00	3 /5 stars
Child occupant protection	35.34/49.00	3 /5 stars

== Fourth generation (N18; 2019, N19; 2026) ==
Fourth generation
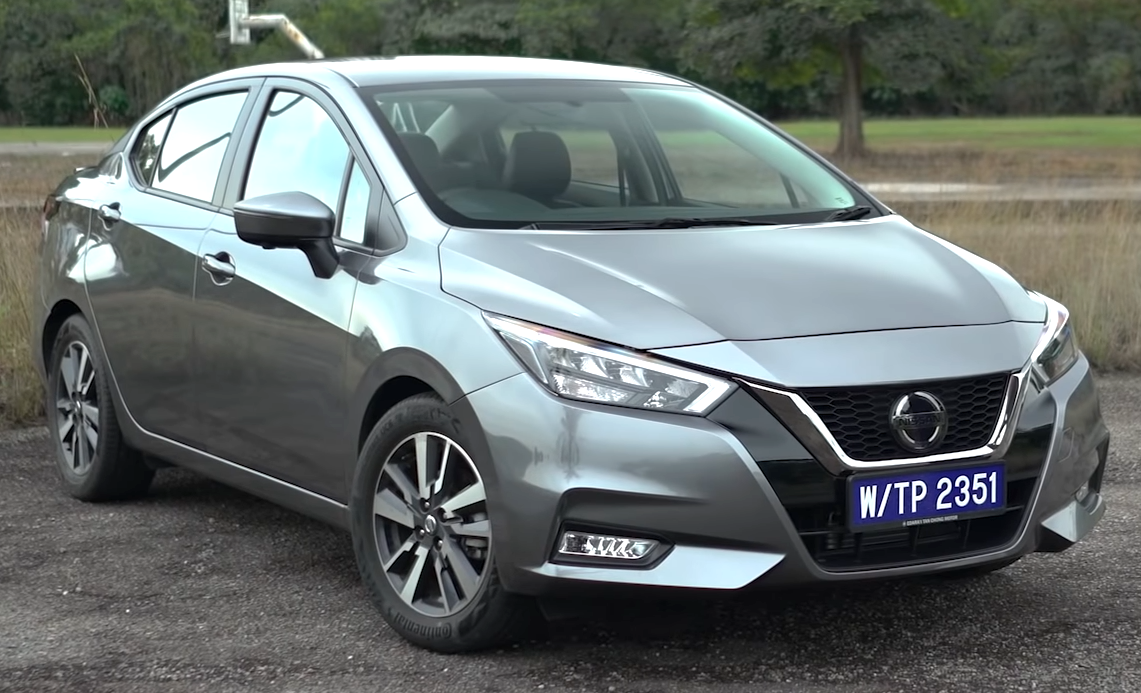
- Nissan Almera 1.0 VLT Turbo (N18, Malaysia)

Overview
- Model code: N18; N19
- Also called: Nissan Versa (Americas); Nissan Sunny; Nissan V-Drive (Latin America, 2026–present)
- Production: 2019–present
- Model years: 2020–2025 (North America); 2020-present (Mexico)
- Assembly: Mexico: Cuernavaca (until 2026), Aguascalientes (Nissan Mexicana, A1, since 2026); Thailand: Samut Prakan (Nissan Motor Thailand); Malaysia: Serendah (TCMA)
- Designer: Hideyuki Fuchigami, Tadashi Katou and Akihiro Higurashi

Body and chassis
- Body style: 4-door sedan
- Platform: Renault-Nissan CMF-B platform
- Related: Nissan Micra (K14); Nissan Kicks (P15)

Powertrain
- Engine: Gasoline/Petrol: 999 cc HRA0DET turbo I3; 1498 cc HR15DE I4; 1598 cc HR16DE I4
- Transmission: 5-speed RS5F91R manual Jatco CVT7 WR JF020E Xtronic CVT

Dimensions
- Wheelbase: 2,620 mm (103.1 in)
- Length: 4,495 mm (177.0 in)
- Width: 1,740 mm (68.5 in)
- Height: 1,460 mm (57.5 in)
- Curb weight: 1,070–1,180 kg (2,359–2,601 lb)

The fourth generation (N18) sedan was unveiled on 12 April 2019 at the Rock the Ocean's Tortuga Music Festival in Fort Lauderdale, Florida, United States, where it was marketed as the third-generation Versa sedan, one week before its public debut at the 2019 New York International Auto Show. It is based on the Renault–Nissan CMF-B, which is shared with the Renault Clio V, Renault Captur, fifth-generation Micra (which shares parts with, including the dashboard), and the Kicks.

A facelifted version was first unveiled on 10 October 2022 for the US market, later spreading to other markets. It features a redesigned front fascia and V-motion grille.

Asian models feature different taillights.

=== Markets ===
==== Americas ====
===== Canada =====
In the Canadian market, the Versa has been on sale since November 2020. It was unveiled at the 2020 Canadian International Motor Show in Toronto. It replaces the Micra when Nissan discontinued it after the 2019 model year. It also marks the return of the Versa sedan in Canada since it was discontinued in 2014. In Canada, it is offered in four variants: S MT, S CVT, SV CVT, and SR CVT. All variants come with a 1.6-litre, naturally aspirated engine. The manual transmission was discontinued for the 2025 model year, one year before the United States.

===== Mexico =====
The third generation Versa sedan came to the Mexican market on 1 October 2019 for the 2020 model year. It comes in four trim lines: Sense, Advance, Exclusive, and Platinum. The previous generation Versa, albeit with fewer trim lines, continued to be sold in Mexico and in Latin America under the name of V-Drive until 2026, when the V-Drive name was transferred to the first facelift N18 Versa sold alongside the second facelift.

The facelifted Versa was launched to the Mexican market on 10 February 2023. Similar to the pre-facelift model, it is powered by the HR16DE naturally-aspirated 1.6-litre engine as standard on four trim levels: Sense, Advance, Exclusive and SR. The Sense and Advance trim levels are paired with 5-speed Manual, while the Advance, Exclusive and SR trim levels are paired with CVT. The sport-oriented SR replaced the luxury-oriented Platinum from the lineup.

The N18 sedan received another update in the form of a heavy facelift. Although it reuses the main structure and chassis of the outgoing model, the front fascia receives a major update resembling the Murano, while the taillights and rear bumpers are also redesigned. It debuted in Mexico alongside the B19 Sentra on 4 March 2026 for the 2027 model year, the codename is N19.

===== United States =====
In the United States, sales began in August 2019, for the 2020 model year. The third-generation Versa is available in three trim levels: S, SV and SR. The new Versa includes the Nissan Safety Shield driver assistance technologies as standard equipment, as well as push-button ignition, 7-inch touchscreen audio system, cruise control, power windows, and power door locks. Higher trim levels offer features such as aluminium-alloy wheels, Apple CarPlay and Android Auto smartphone integration, SiriusXM Satellite Radio, a LCD instrument cluster display, LED daytime running accent lamps, Nissan Intelligent Key system, and combination Primatex (leatherette) and cloth seating surfaces.

The facelifted Versa was unveiled on October 10, 2022 for the 2023 model year. It features a new S Plus package, which adds Apple CarPlay and Android Auto to the S trim.

In June 2025, Nissan announced that it would discontinue the base, 5-speed manual model of the Versa in the United States due to both United States tariffs on auto manufacturing in Mexico and a lack of sales; it was the last car sold in the U.S. to still offer a 5-speed manual option.

Nissan has discontinued the Versa for the U.S. market after the 2025 model year, with production ending in December 2025. No 2026 model will be available stateside, ending its run as America's cheapest new car under $20,000. Nissan cites its product strategy shift toward higher-margin vehicles like the Sentra and Kicks.

==== Middle East ====
The Sunny was also launched for Middle Eastern markets at the Dubai International Motor Show on 13 November 2019. It is powered by a 1.6-litre petrol engine. It is offered in three trim levels; S, SV, SV+, SL and SL+, the S trim is paired with a 5-speed manual and CVT, and the SV and SL trim levels are paired with CVT only.

The facelifted Sunny was launched on 30 October 2023.

In June 2025, the manual transmission was discontinued due to declining sales.

==== Southeast Asia ====
===== Brunei =====
The fourth-generation Almera was launched in Brunei on 27 February 2020. The car is only available with the 1.0-litre turbocharger engine and Xtronic CVT in this market, in two trim levels: Turbo Standard and the Turbo Premium. The Almera for Bruneian market received a facelift on 28 February 2024.

===== Malaysia =====
The fourth-generation Nissan Almera went on sale in Malaysia in November 2020. At launch, it was available in three trim levels: VL, VL Premium and VL Tech. All trim levels comes with Autonomous Emergency Braking as standard which includes Intelligent Forward Collision Warning (IFCW) and Intelligent Forward Emergency Braking (IFEB). All trim levels are powered by the HRA0 turbocharged 1.0 L engine. According to Edaran Tan Chong Malaysia (TCMA), the Almera on sale in Malaysia has the highest specification in the ASEAN market.

===== Philippines =====
The fourth-generation Almera was launched in the Philippines on 8 October 2021 and was initially offered in three trim levels: EL Turbo (5-speed manual), VE Turbo (5-speed manual and CVT) and VL N-Sport Turbo (CVT only). All models are offered with the 1.0-litre turbocharged engine. The new Almera became imported from Thailand instead of being built locally at the former Nissan Santa Rosa plant.

In January 2023, the VL N-Sport Turbo trim was removed from the lineup. This was replaced by the lower priced VE N-Sport trim. Nissan further decontented the Almera by removing four of the six airbags that it had been fitted with before.

The facelifted Almera was launched in the Philippine market on 10 July 2023, still with the same turbocharged 1.0-litre engine. It is available in three trim levels: EL Turbo, VE Turbo and VL Turbo, the EL Turbo trim is paired with 5-speed manual, while the VE Turbo and VL Turbo trim levels are paired with CVT. The manual variant of the VE Turbo and VE Turbo N-Sport CVT trim were removed from the lineup.

On 30 July 2024, the VL Sport Turbo trim was added to the lineup.

===== Thailand =====
The fourth generation Almera was launched in Thailand on 14 November 2019. In Thailand, the Almera is offered in five trim levels: S Turbo, E Turbo, EL Turbo, V Turbo and VL Turbo. All models are powered by the HRA0 turbocharged 1.0-litre engine.

The Almera Sportech was launched on 2 June 2021. It is available in V Turbo and VL Turbo trim levels.

The limited-edition Almera Sportech-X was launched on 8 August 2022 and is available in VL trim. Over 300 units were made.

The facelifted Almera was launched on 11 May 2023. Similar to the pre-facelift model, it is powered by the HRA0 turbocharged 1.0-litre engine as standard on 4 trim levels: E Turbo, EL Turbo, V Turbo and VL Turbo. The S Turbo trim was removed from the lineup due to slow sales.

===== Vietnam =====
The fourth-generation Almera was launched in Vietnam on 4 August 2021 and it was sold in three trim levels; E Turbo MT, EL Turbo CVT, and VL Turbo CVT. The Almera in Vietnam is fully imported from Thailand.

The facelifted Almera was launched on 28 November 2024 and it was sold in three trim levels; EL Turbo, V Turbo, and VL Turbo.

=== Gallery ===
==== Nissan Almera ====
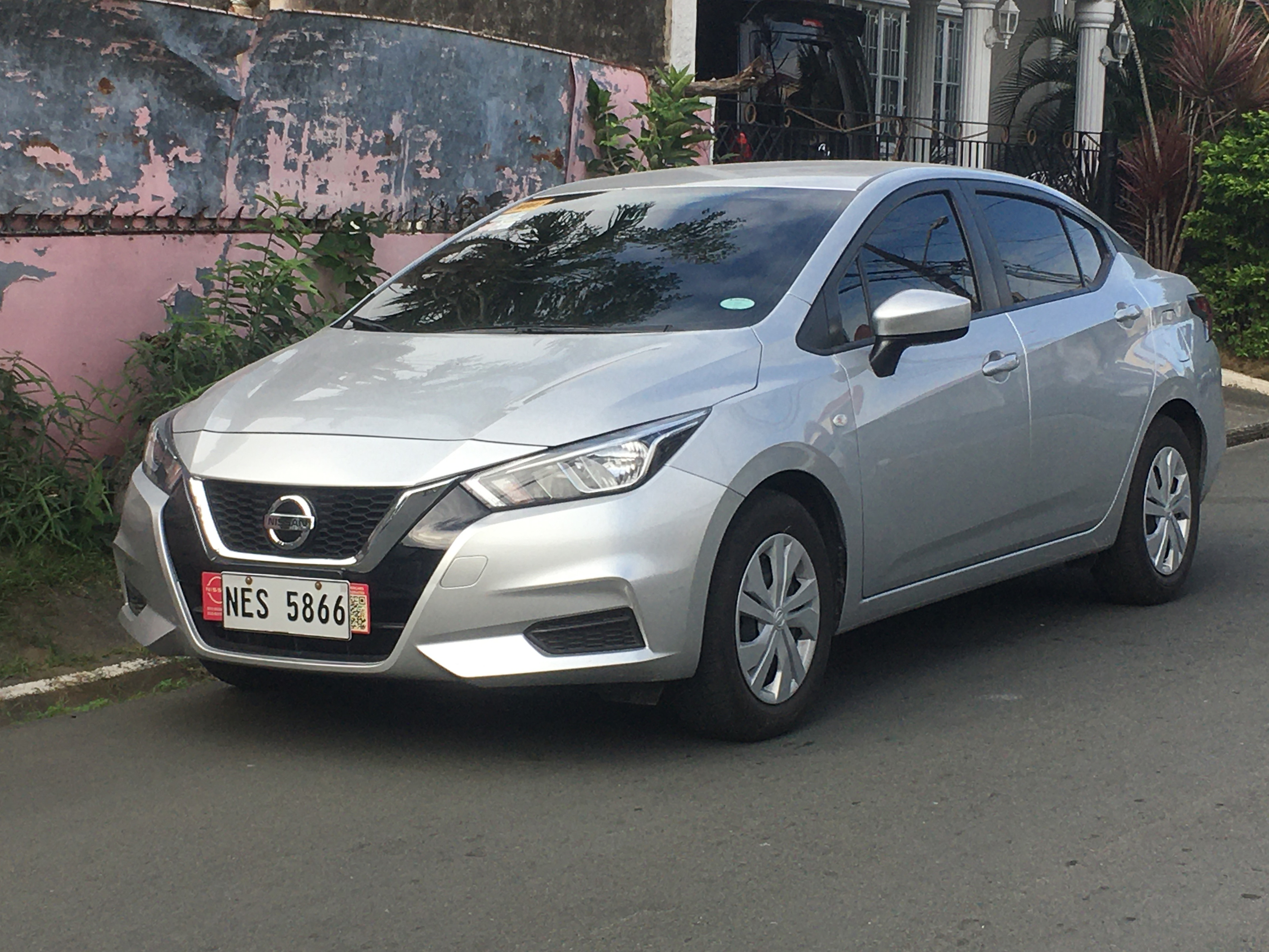
2022 Almera 1.0 Turbo EL (Philippines; pre-facelift)

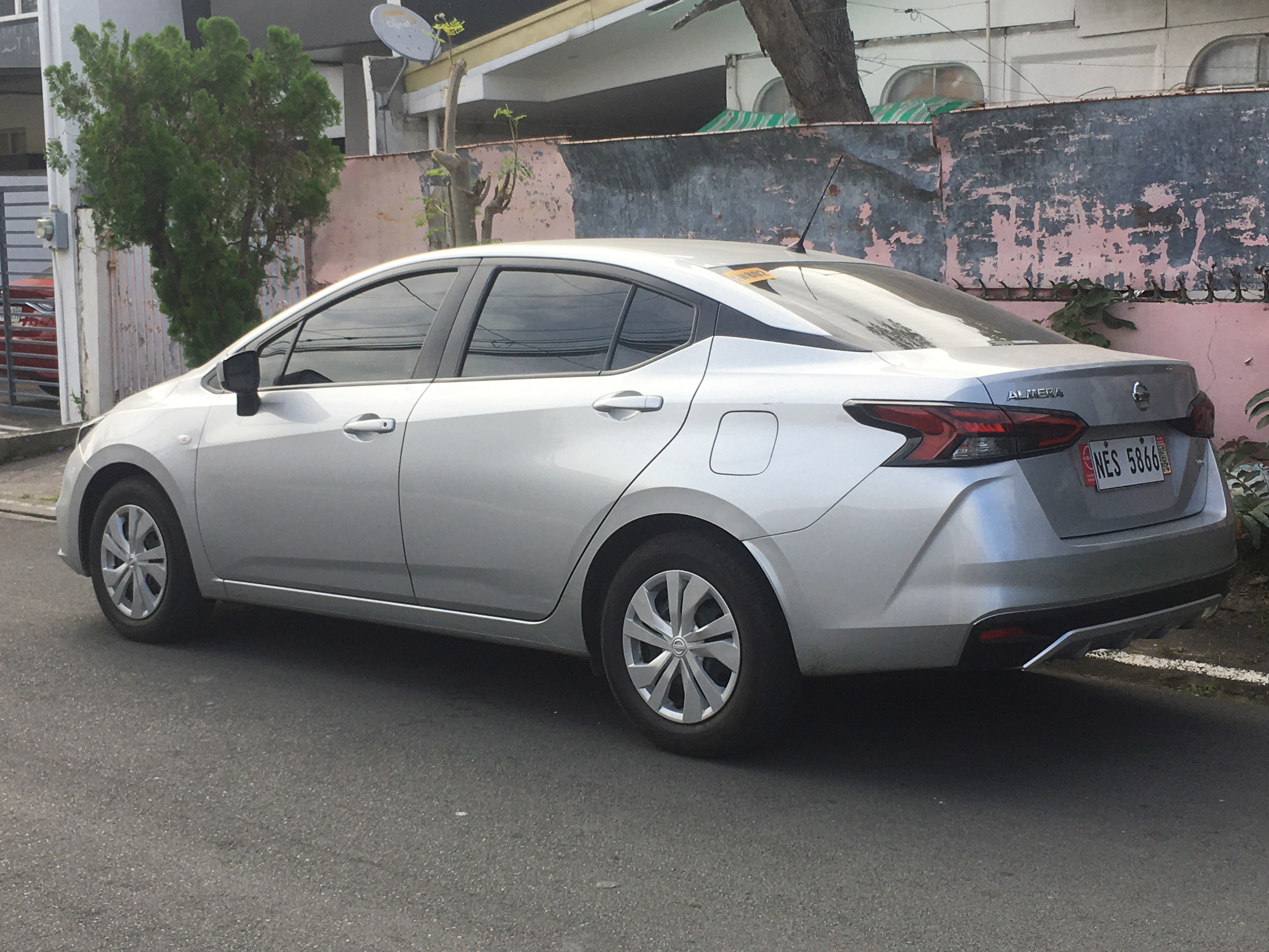
2022 Almera 1.0 Turbo EL (Philippines; pre-facelift)

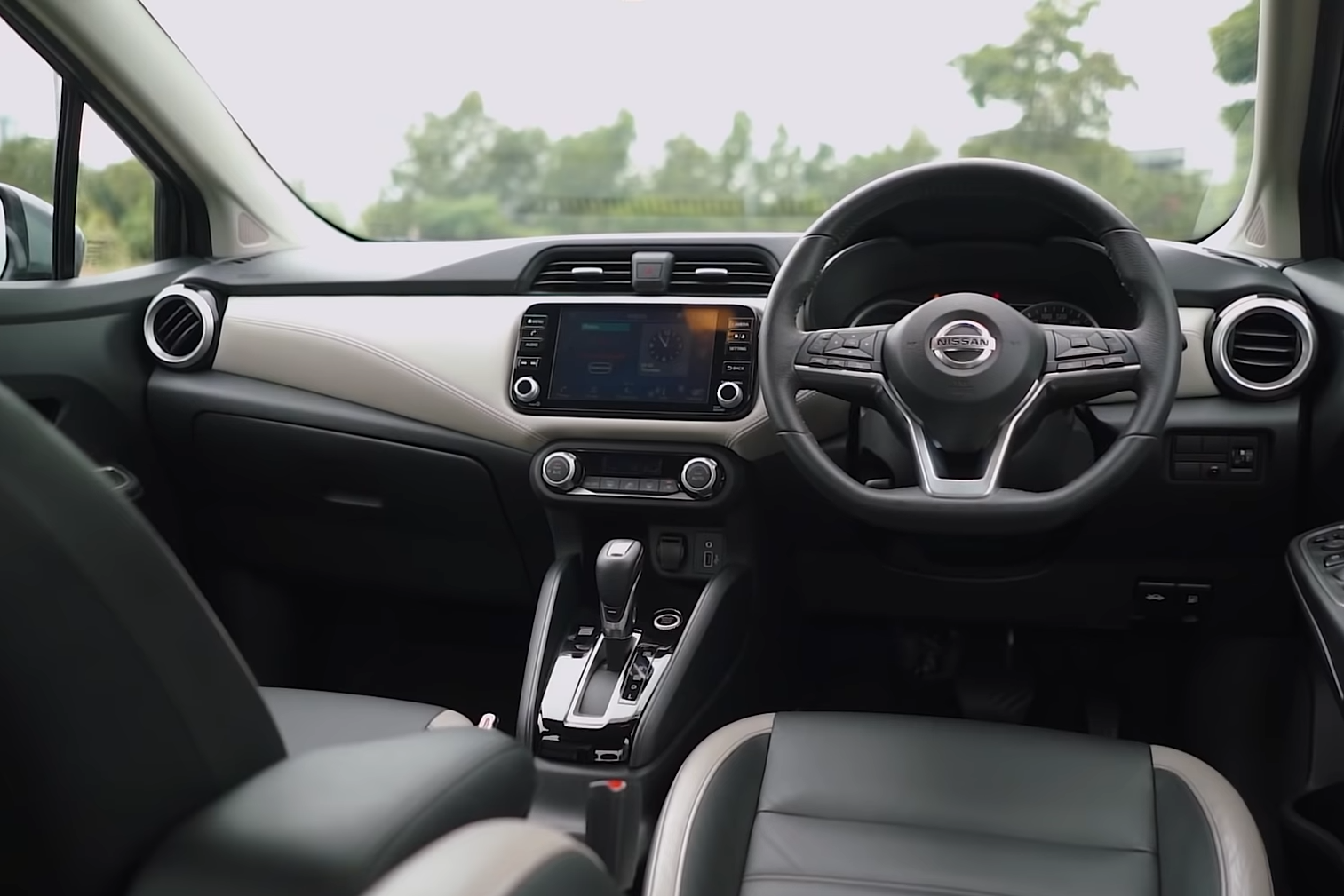
2020 Nissan Almera 1.0 VLT Turbo interior (Malaysia)

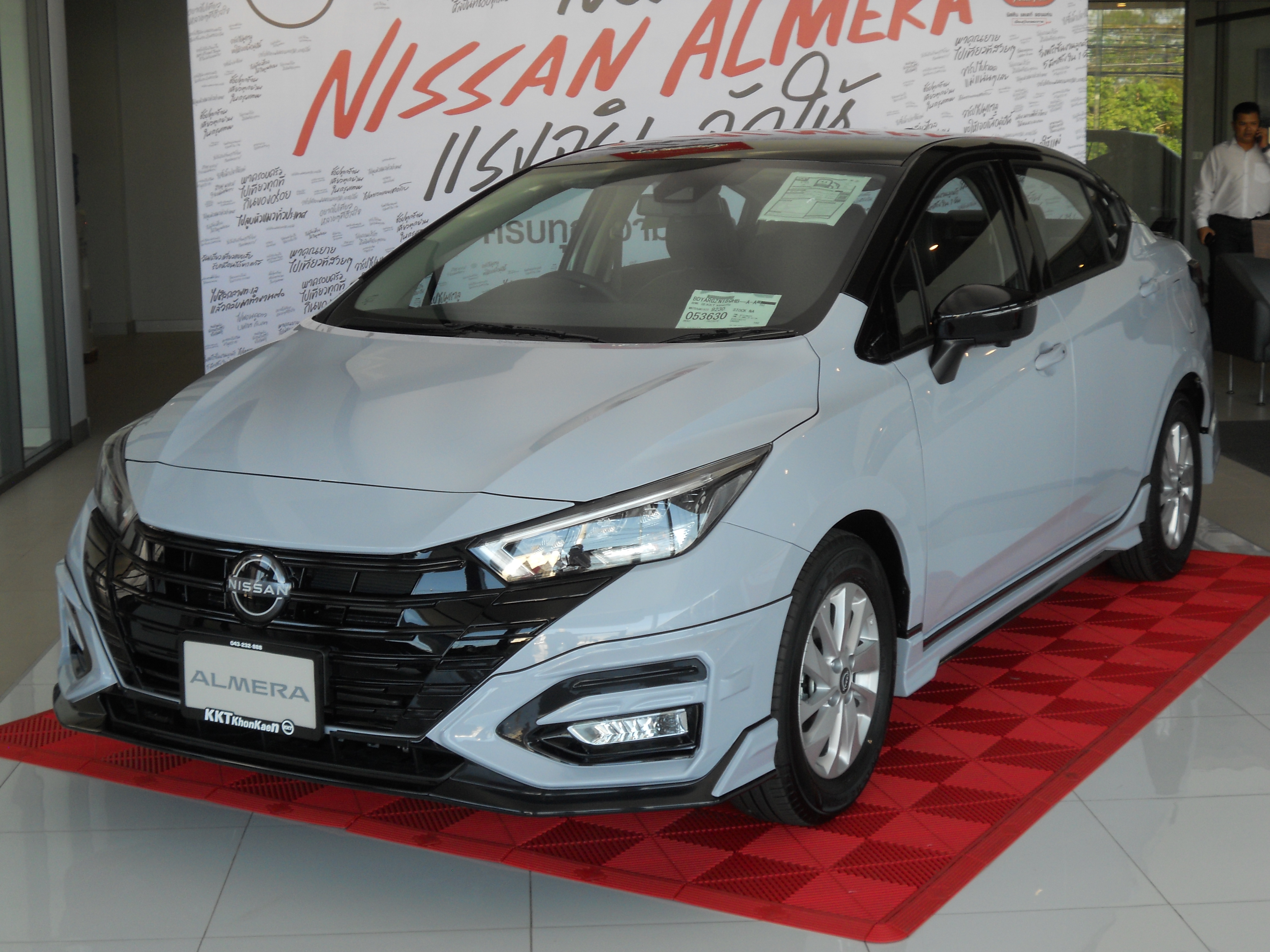
2023 Nissan Almera 1.0 VL Turbo (Thailand; facelift)

==== Nissan Versa ====
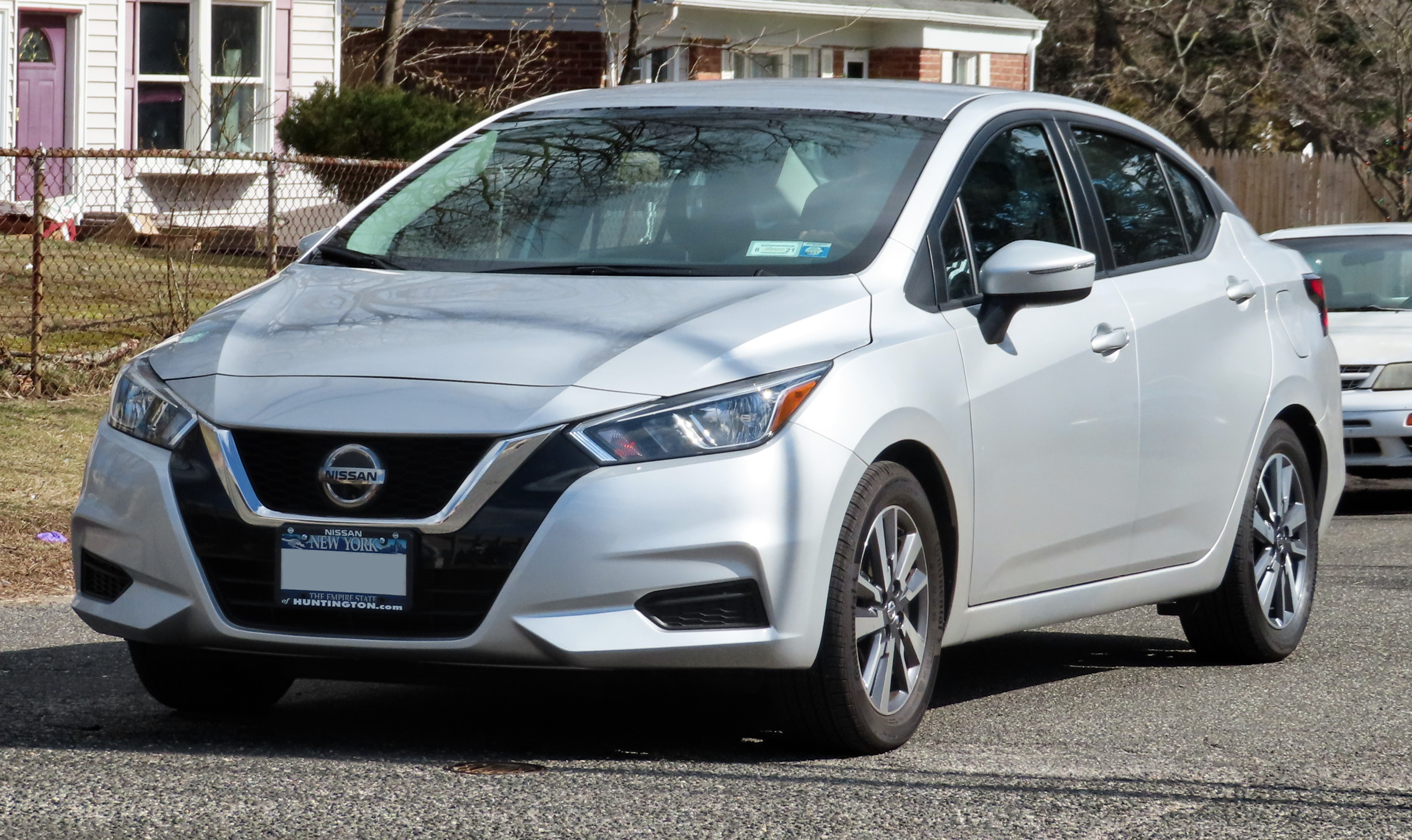
2020 Versa SV (US; pre-facelift)

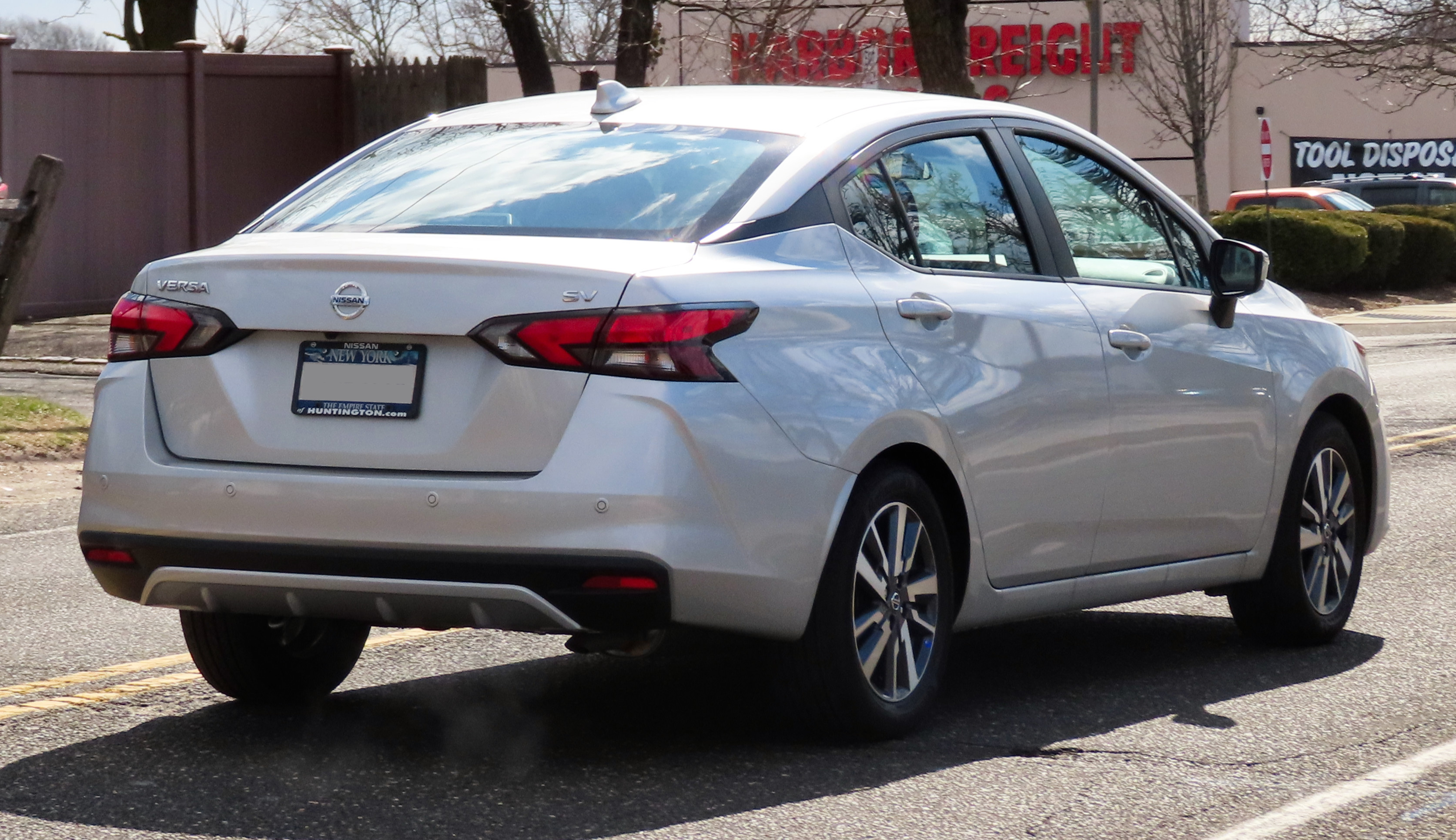
2020 Versa SV (US; pre-facelift)

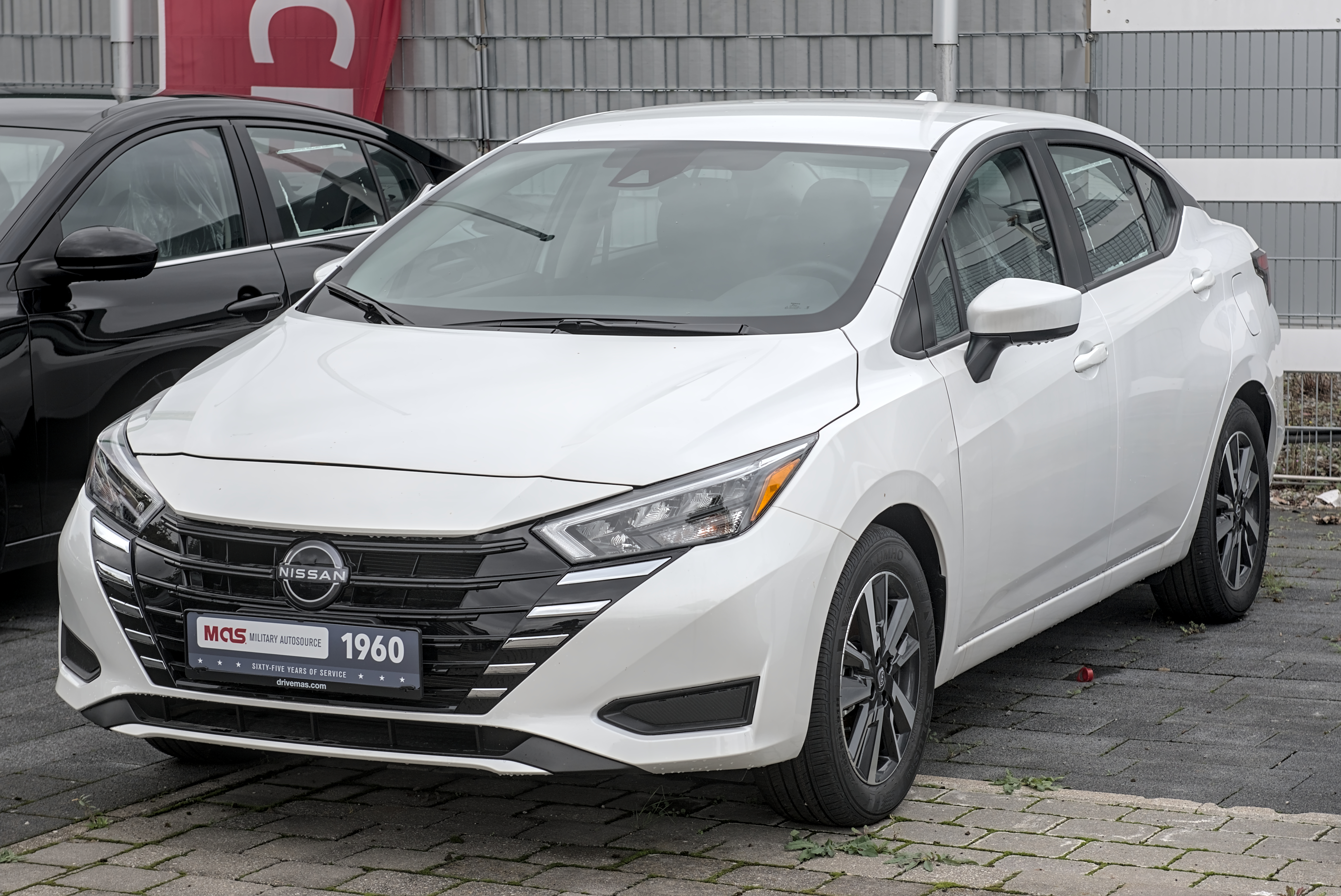
2023 Versa (US, facelift; German import)

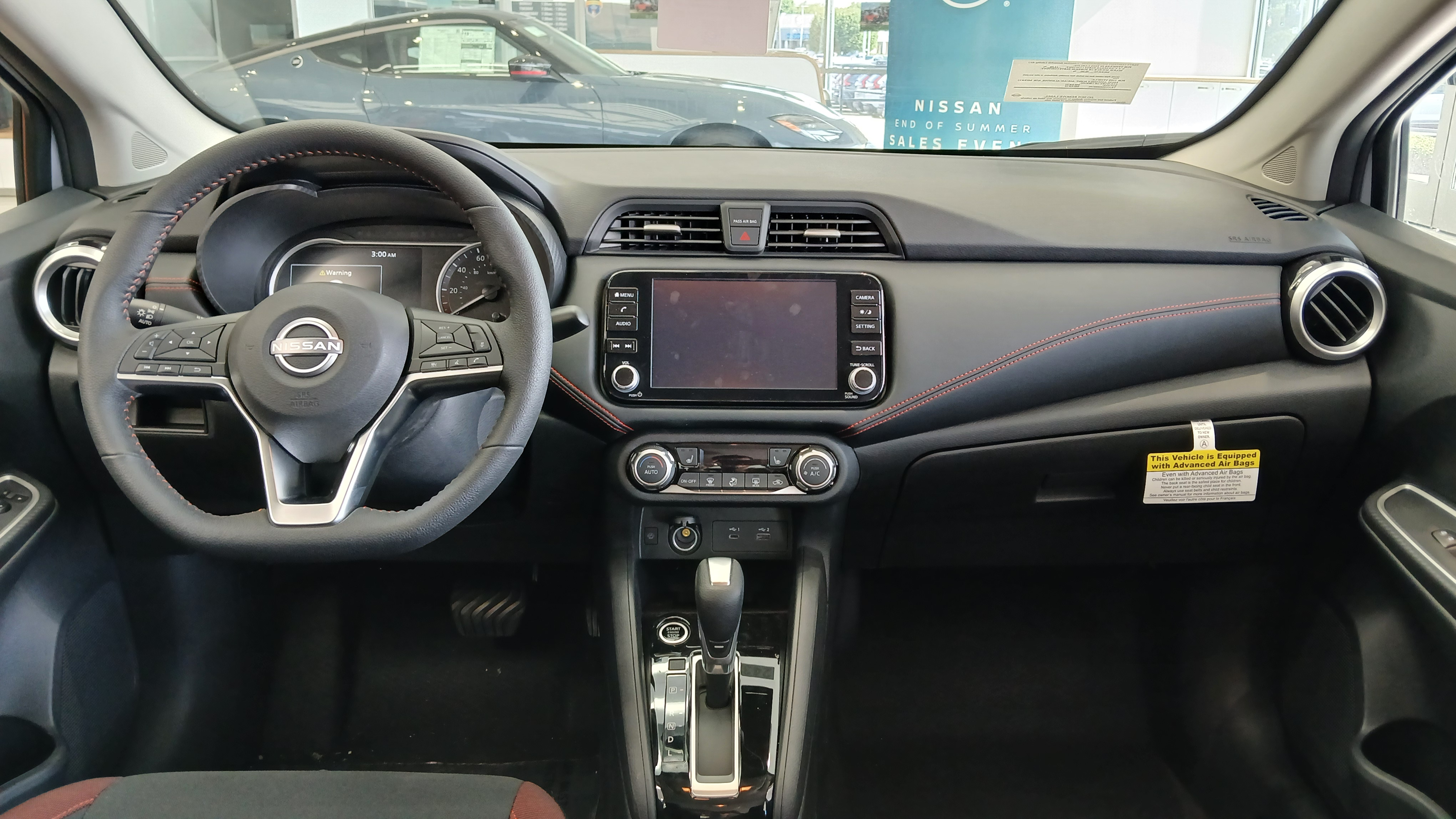
Interior (US)

=== Safety ===
==== ASEAN NCAP ====
ASEAN NCAP test results Nissan Almera (2025)
Test	Points
Overall:	4 /5 stars
Adult occupant:	36.34
Child occupant:	16.35
Safety assist:	13.74
Motorcyclist Safety:	8.30

==== IIHS ====
The 2021 Versa was tested by the IIHS:

IIHS scores
Moderate overlap front	Good
Side (original test)	Good

== Other versions ==
=== G10 (2006–2010) ===
In 2002, Renault Samsung Motors in South Korea started manufacturing the Renault Samsung SM3, sharing the Nissan Bluebird Sylphy N16 basis used for the Almera. It was facelifted in 2005, and from April 2006 it started selling as the Almera Classic in Ukraine and Russia, as the Almera B10 in Central America, Venezuela and Ecuador, and as the Sunny B10 in the Middle East. In Colombia, Mexico, Libya and Egypt, the car was sold as the Renault Scala and in Chile as the Renault Samsung SM3.

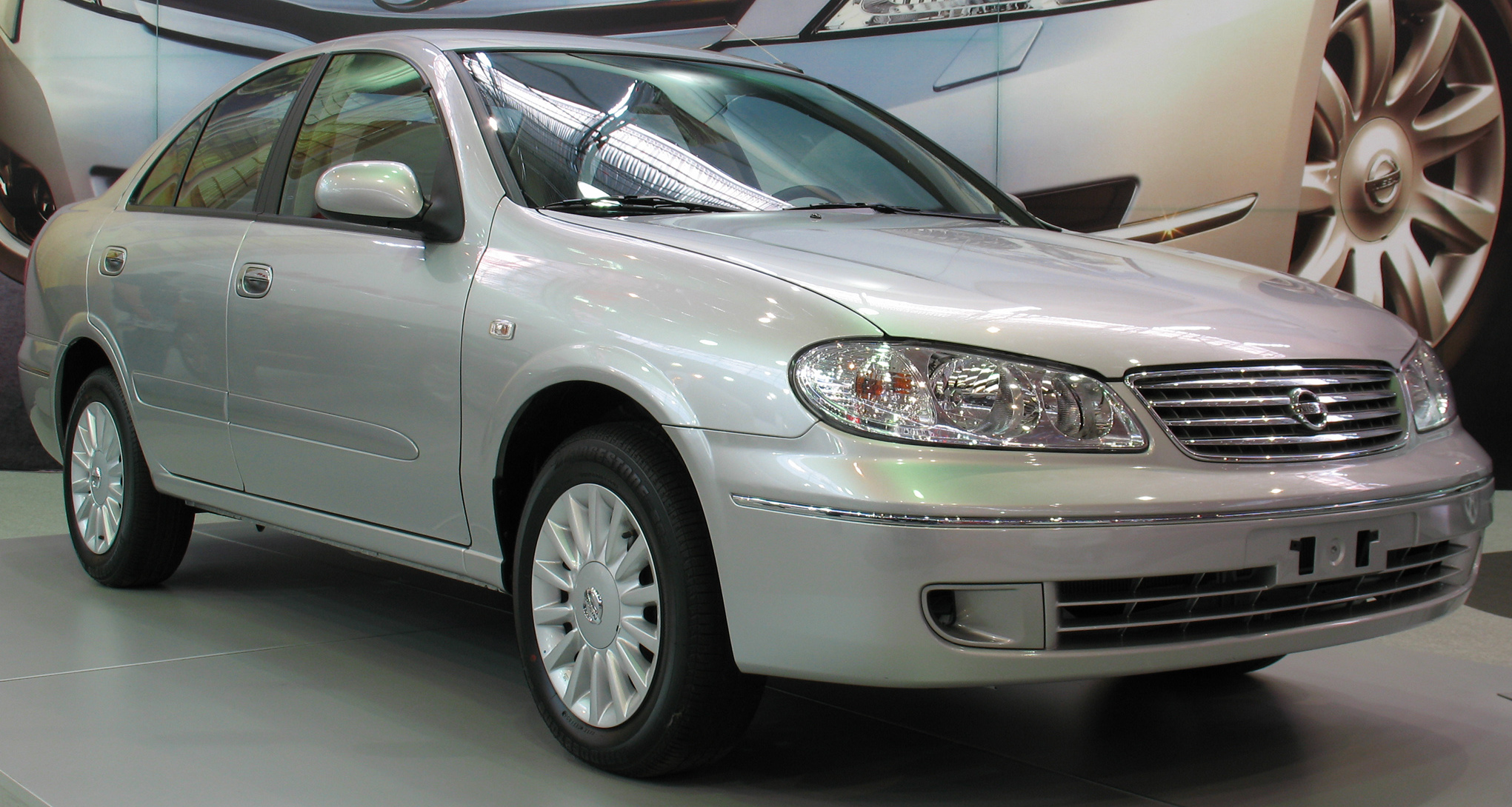
2008 Nissan Almera SG (Chile)

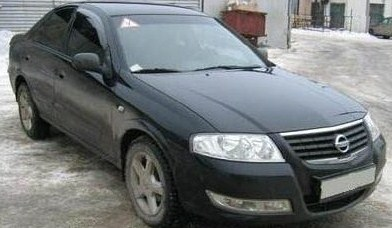
Nissan Almera Classic (B10, 2006–2010) (Russia, front)

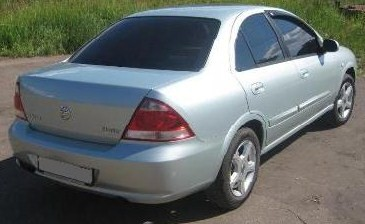
Nissan Almera Classic (B10, 2006–2010) (Russia, rear)

=== G15 (2012–2018) ===
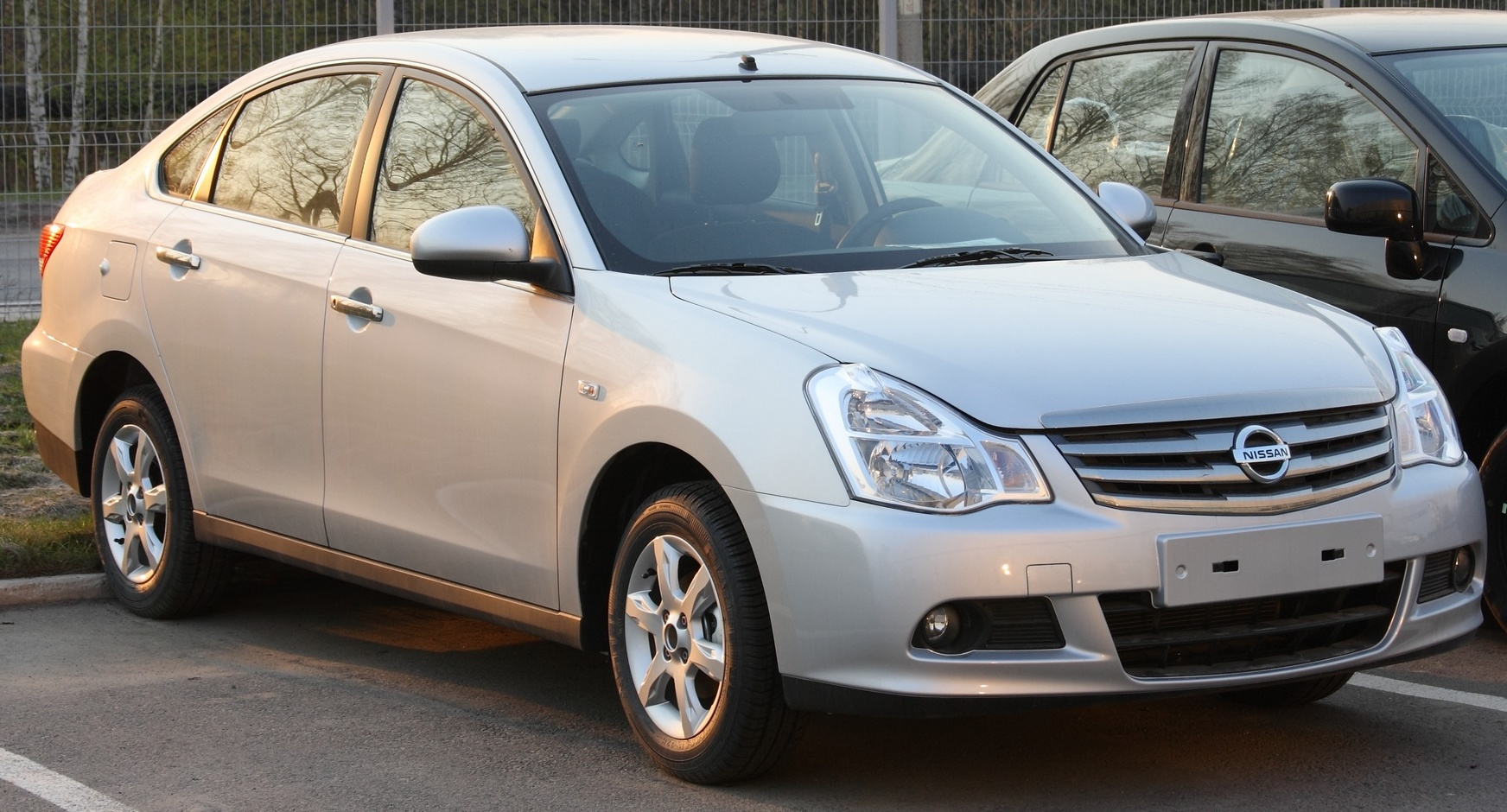
Nissan Almera (G11; 2012–2018)

In Russia, the Nissan Bluebird Sylphy was marketed as the Nissan Almera (G15). It received its world premiere at the 2012 Moscow International Automobile Salon on 29 August 2012, and uses the same design as the Bluebird Sylphy but a redesigned dashboard interior, adapted from the first-generation Renault Logan. It has a 1.6-litre petrol engine (75 kW), with a five-speed manual or a four-speed automatic transmission, and was manufactured locally at the AvtoVAZ plant since December 2012. Sales began in April 2013 and stopped in October 2018.
