= Nissan Sylphy =

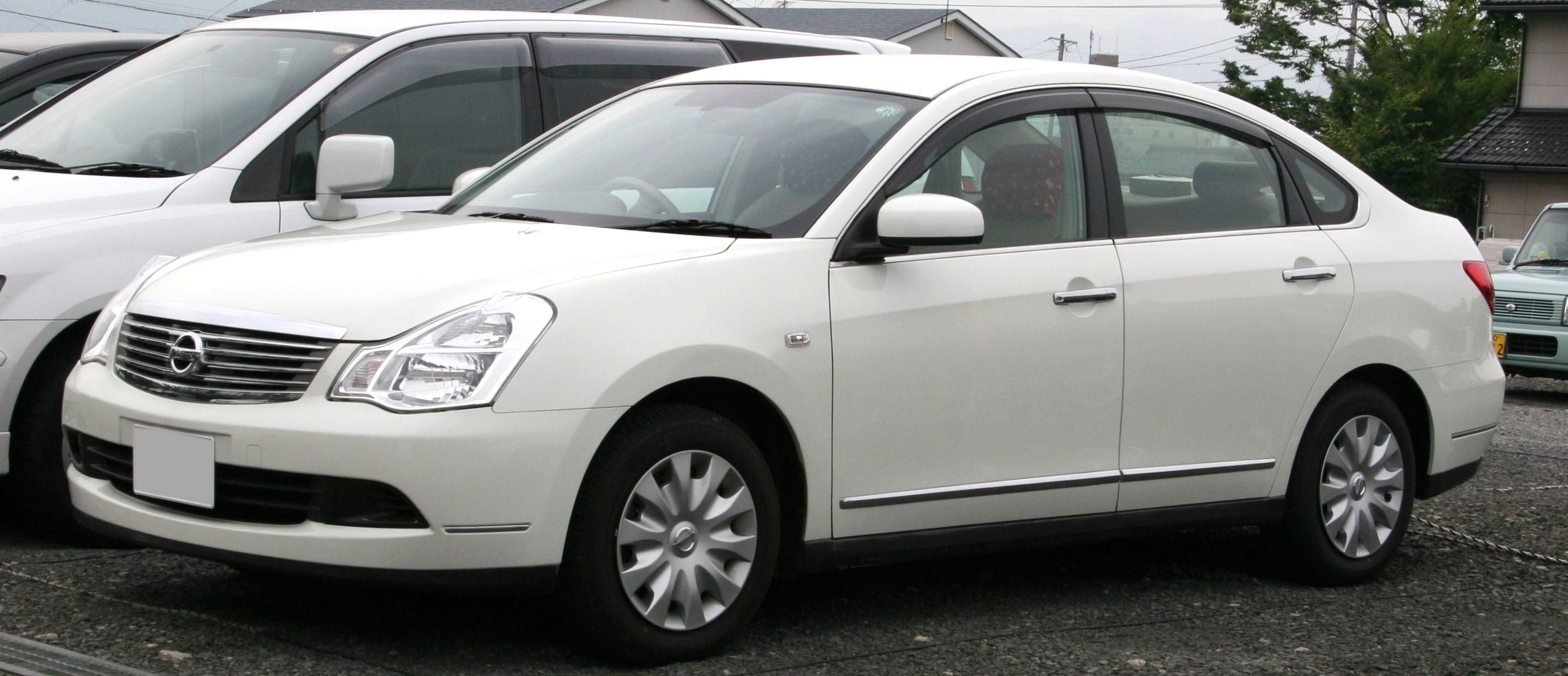
- Nissan Bluebird Sylphy (G11)

Overview
- Manufacturer: Nissan
- Production: 2000–present

Body and chassis
- Class: Compact car (C)

Chronology
- Predecessor: Nissan Bluebird

The Nissan Sylphy (Japanese: 日産・シルフィ, Hepburn: Nissan Shirufi) is a compact car produced by the Japanese car maker Nissan since 2000 as the successor to the Nissan Pulsar. The Sylphy has also been marketed in export markets under several other nameplates, including Pulsar, Almera, Sunny and Sentra. For the third-generation model (B17) introduced in 2012, the Sylphy model was merged with the B17 Sentra, meaning it is no longer a standalone model.

Until 2012, it is known as the Nissan Bluebird Sylphy (Japanese: 日産・ブルーバードシルフィ, Hepburn: Nissan Burūbādo Shirufi) in Japan. The initial Bluebird Sylphy nameplate was a continuation for the larger Bluebird which was phased out in 2001. It was renamed the Sylphy for the third-generation model in 2012.

== First generation (G10/N16; 2000) ==
First generation (G10/N16)
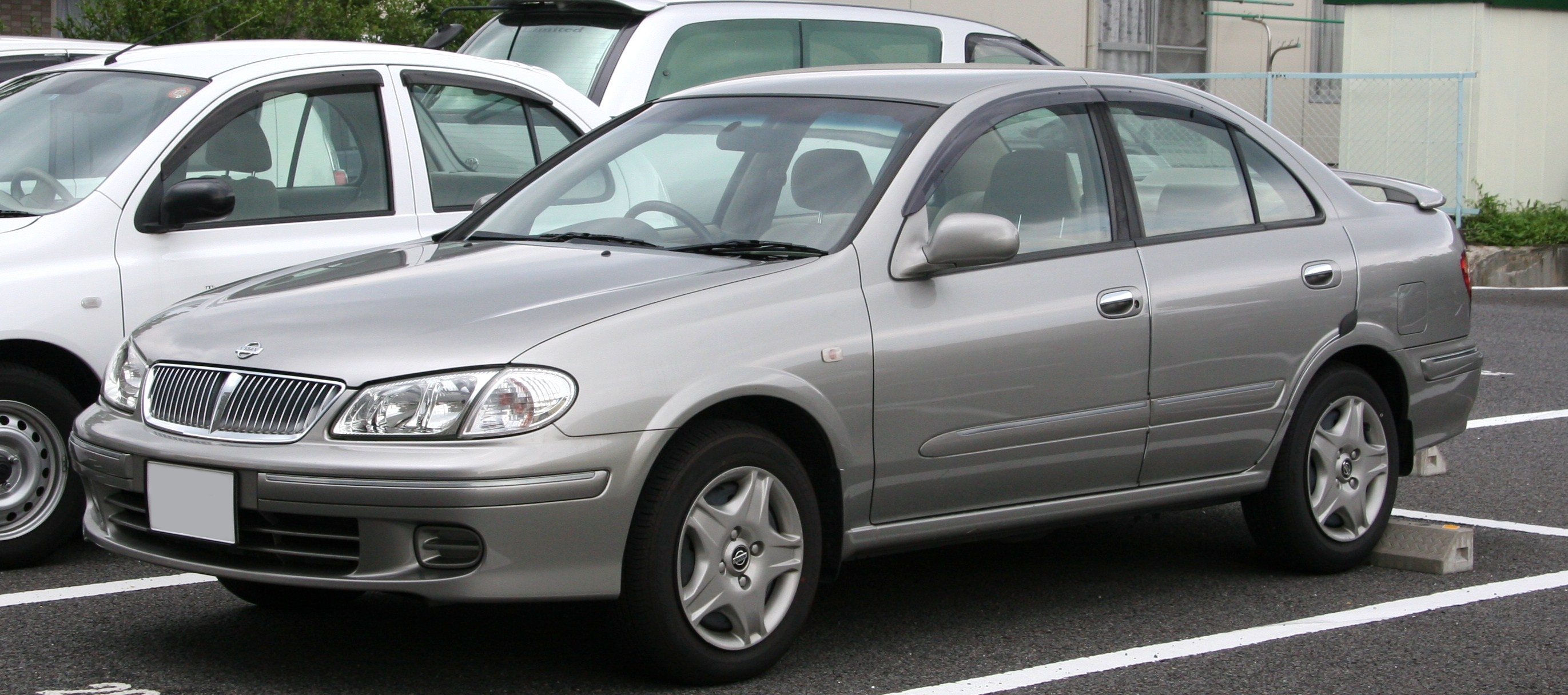
- 2000–2003 Nissan Bluebird Sylphy sedan (Japan)

Overview
- Also called: Nissan Bluebird Sylphy; Nissan Almera; Nissan Pulsar; Nissan Sentra (Malaysia/Brunei/Taiwan/Philippines); Nissan Sunny/Sunny Neo (Middle East, Southeast Asia and Egypt); Renault Samsung SM3; Renault Scala
- Production: 2000–2005 (G10); 2000–2012 (N16)
- Assembly: Japan: Yokosuka, Kanagawa (Oppama Plant); China: Guangzhou (Dongfeng Nissan); Malaysia: Kuala Lumpur; Philippines: Santa Rosa City; Taiwan: Miaoli; Thailand: Samut Prakan; United Kingdom: Washington, Tyne and Wear (Almera/Pulsar); Egypt: 2006-2015

Body and chassis
- Body style: 4-door sedan 5-door hatchback (Pulsar)
- Layout: Front-engine, front-wheel-drive Front-engine, four-wheel-drive
- Platform: Nissan MS platform
- Related: Nissan Sentra (B15) (North America); Nissan Sunny (B15) (Japan)

Powertrain
- Engine: Petrol: 1.3 L QG13DE I4; 1.5 L QG15DE I4; 1.6 L QG16DE I4; 1.8 L QG18DE I4; 2.0 L QR20DD I4; 2.0 L SR20DE I4 （China Only); Diesel: 2.2 L YD22DDT turbo I4; 2.2 L YD22DDTi Common rail turbo I4
- Transmission: 5-speed manual 4-speed automatic

Dimensions
- Wheelbase: 2,550 mm (100.4 in)
- Length: 4,495 mm (177.0 in)
- Width: 1,695 mm (66.7 in)
- Height: 1,445 mm (56.9 in)
- Curb weight: 1,130–1,220 kg (2,490–2,690 lb)

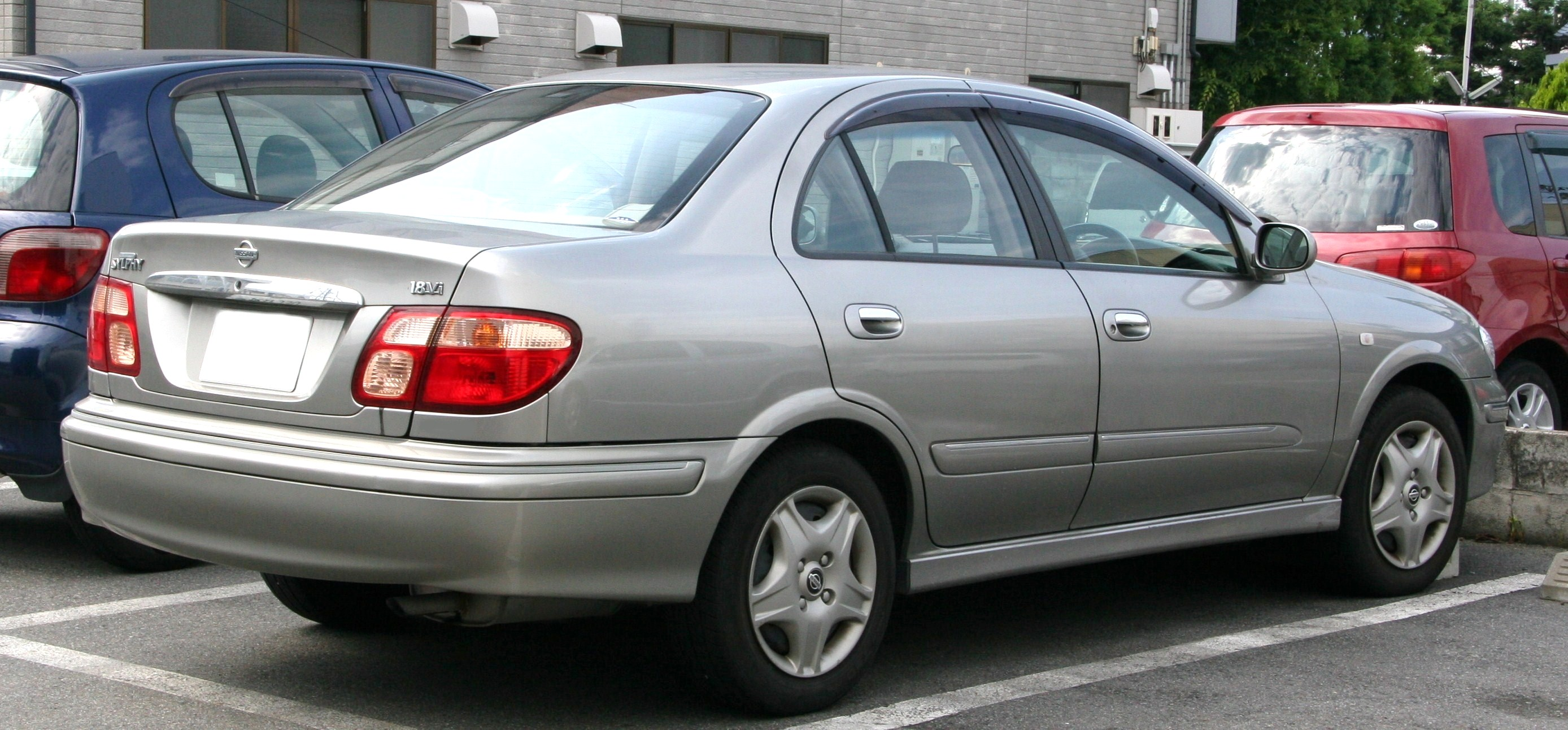
2000–2003 Nissan Bluebird Sylphy sedan (Japan)

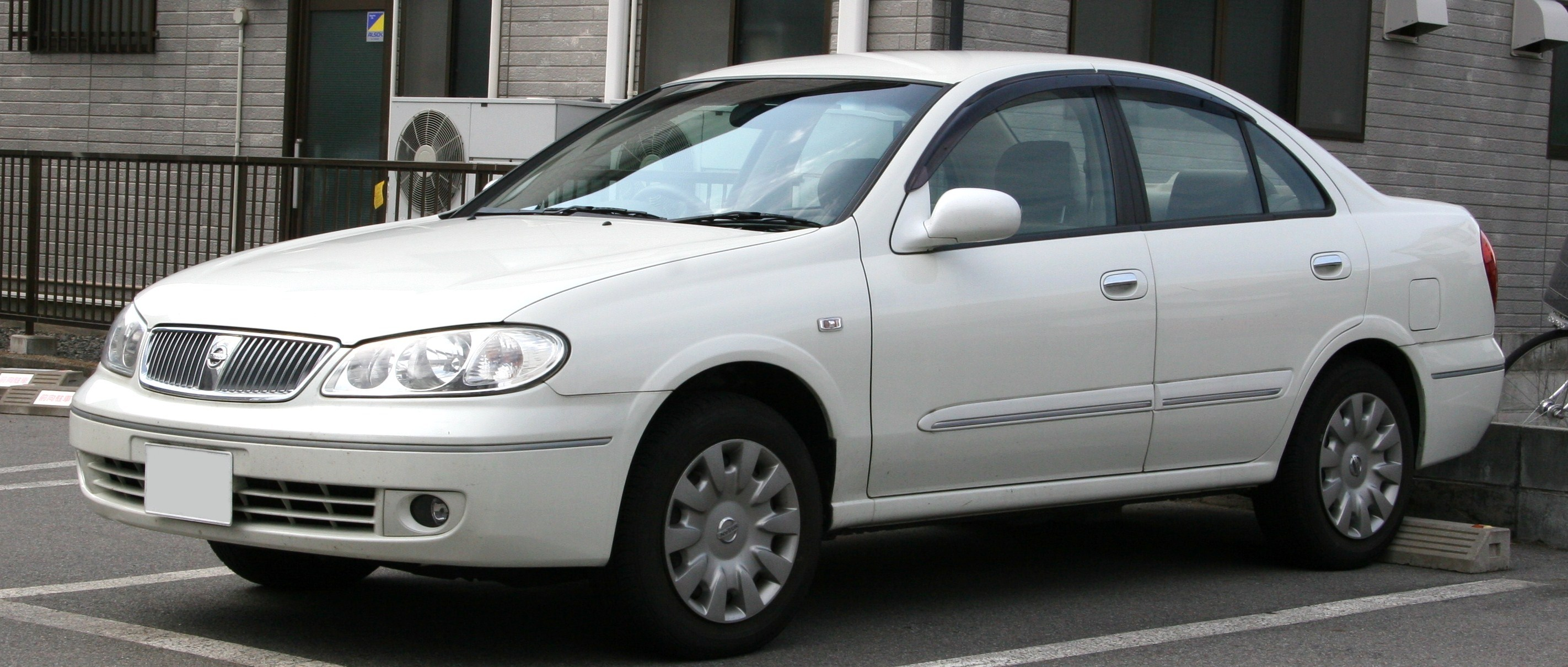

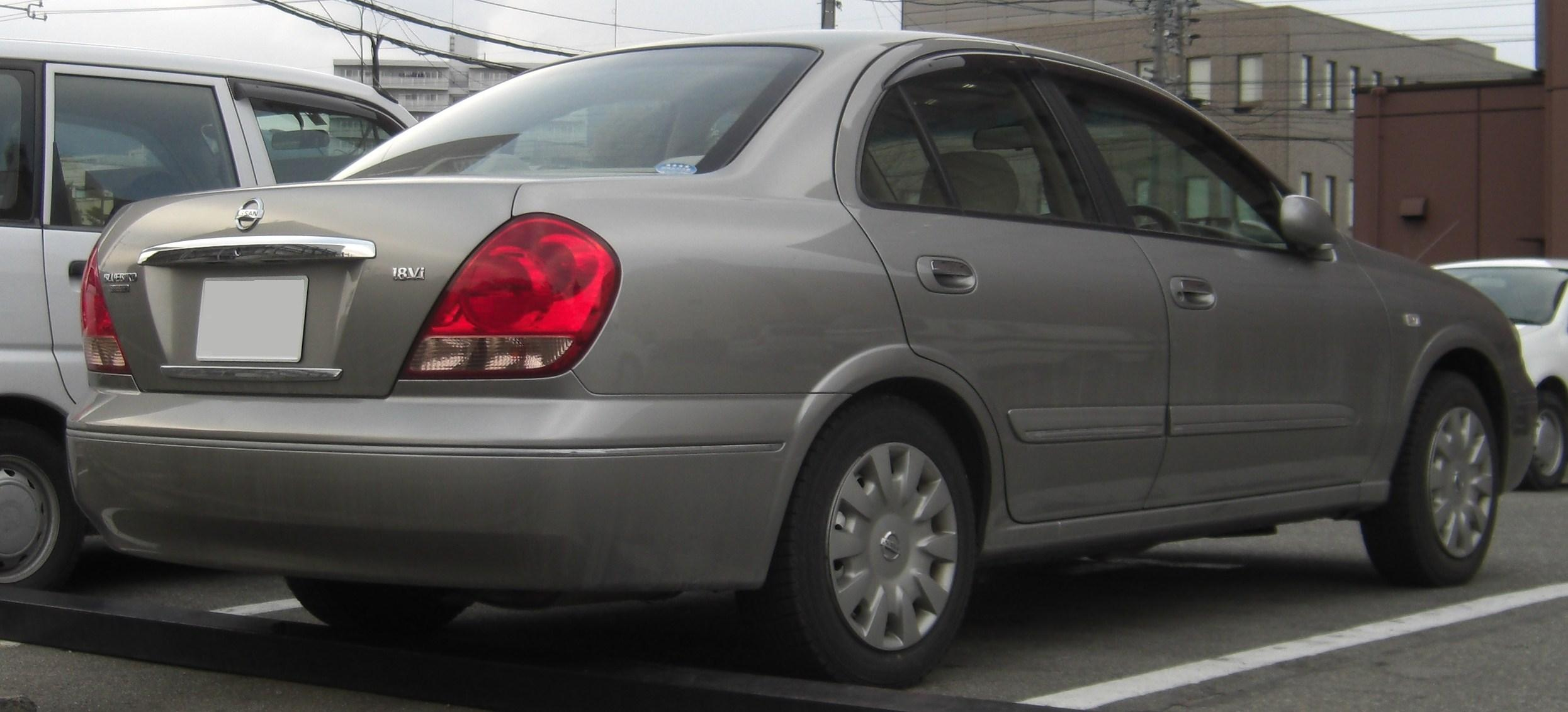
2003–2005 Nissan Bluebird Sylphy sedan (Japan)

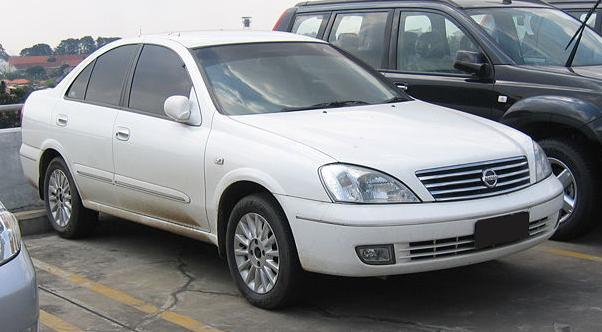
2005–2008 Nissan Sunny Neo GL sedan (Indonesia)

Nissan launched the G10 or N16 series Bluebird Sylphy in August 2000 as a replacement in the Japanese market for the Nissan Pulsar (N15), and it was exclusive to Japanese dealerships called Blue Stage. The model code of "G10" used in Japan differed from most other markets which retained the legacy N-series (N16) naming scheme inherited from the Pulsar. The change in name from Pulsar to Bluebird Sylphy in Japan came about as Nissan was about to phase out the long-running Bluebird, and this kept the old name alive. Export markets received this same vehicle under a myriad of alternative names: Almera in Europe and Brunei; Pulsar in Australasia; Sentra in Indonesia, Malaysia, the Philippines and Taiwan; plus Sunny in Hong Kong, Singapore, Thailand, Sri Lanka and the Middle East. In Sri Lanka, it is important to highlight that the EX saloon of the Nissan Sunny N16 came with a black grille with horizontal bars. It was not available in North America; instead, there was the Sunny-based Nissan Sentra (B15).

The Bluebird Sylphy was made available in a single body style, a well equipped small four-door sedan. The factory in the UK, where the N16 was manufactured as the Almera, continued to produce three- and five-door hatchback versions. These European models featured slightly different frontal styling—a unique grille, bonnet and bumper accommodated the headlamp design shared with Japanese models. Some European markets also received an Almera sedan model, which featured the same frontal styling as the hatchbacks. British-made Almeras also saw some exports outside of Europe, mainly to Australia and with Pulsar badging.

The new platform spawned a compact MPV version (the Nissan Almera Tino or Nissan Tino) for the first time. The Nissan Wingroad continued to be sold as the Pulsar wagon or Almera Traveller in many countries.

The original release Bluebird Sylphy had a vertical chrome grille with Nissan emblem on the bonnet. In February 2003, the Bluebird Sylphy received minor changes with a revised grille (with the Nissan emblem moved onto the grille) and an all-new rear end with J31 Teana-inspired tail lights. This update also applied to the Sunny and Sentra models in Southeast Asia. Australian Pulsar sedans received the same update, although a horizontally-stated grille featured instead.

In October 2005, the second generation Nissan Bluebird Sylphy (G11 series) was previewed at the Tokyo Motor Show. In Japan, the Nissan Tiida hatchback and Tiida Latio sedan replaced also replaced the G10/N16 range, particularly in export markets where the G11 was not offered.

Although the release of the G11 series Sylphy and Tiida signified the withdrawal of the G10/N16 from many markets, it was facelifted for an October 2005 release as a budget model to sit beneath the G11 Sylphy and Tiida in Southeast Asian markets such as Malaysia, Singapore and Thailand. This more substantial front-end facelift allowed for the fitment of reshaped headlamps, a revised front bumper and fenders, and a new grille and bonnet.

=== Regions ===
==== Asia ====
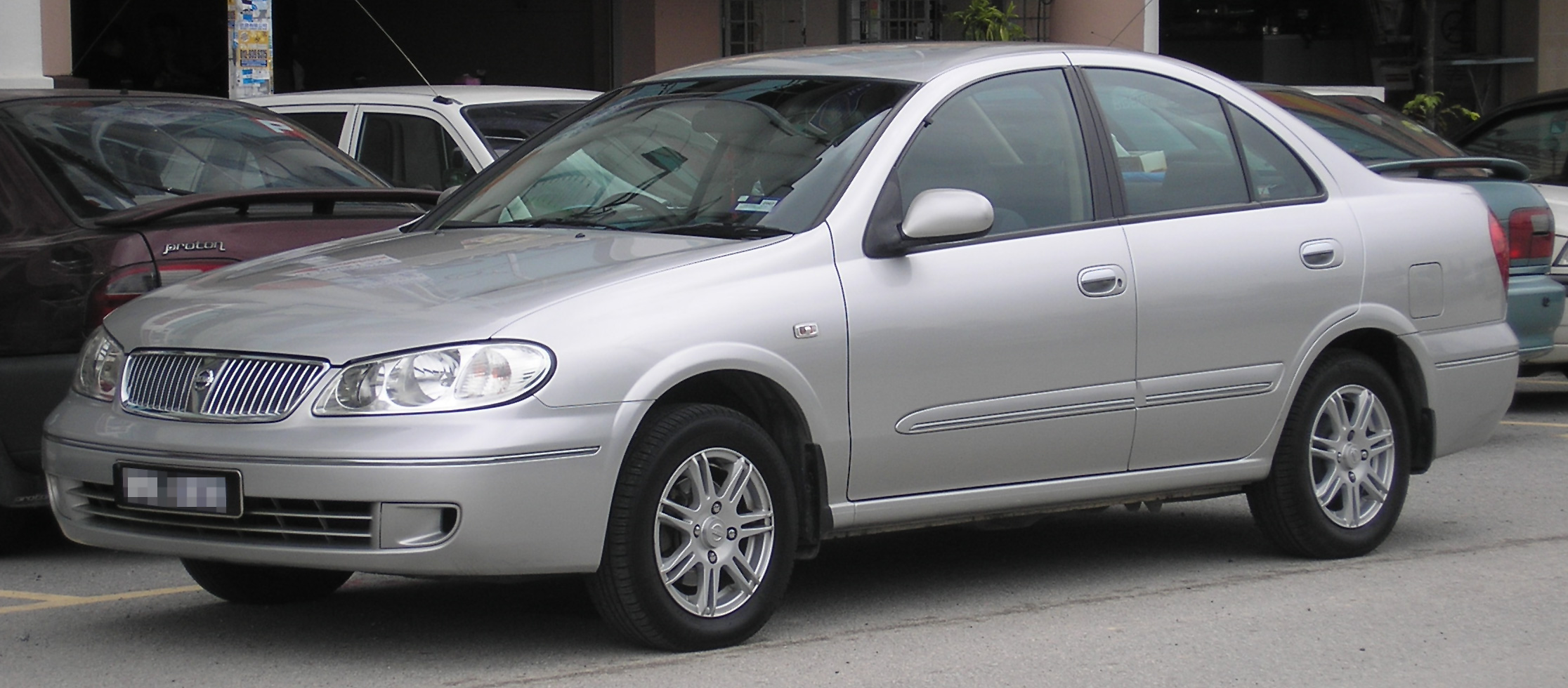

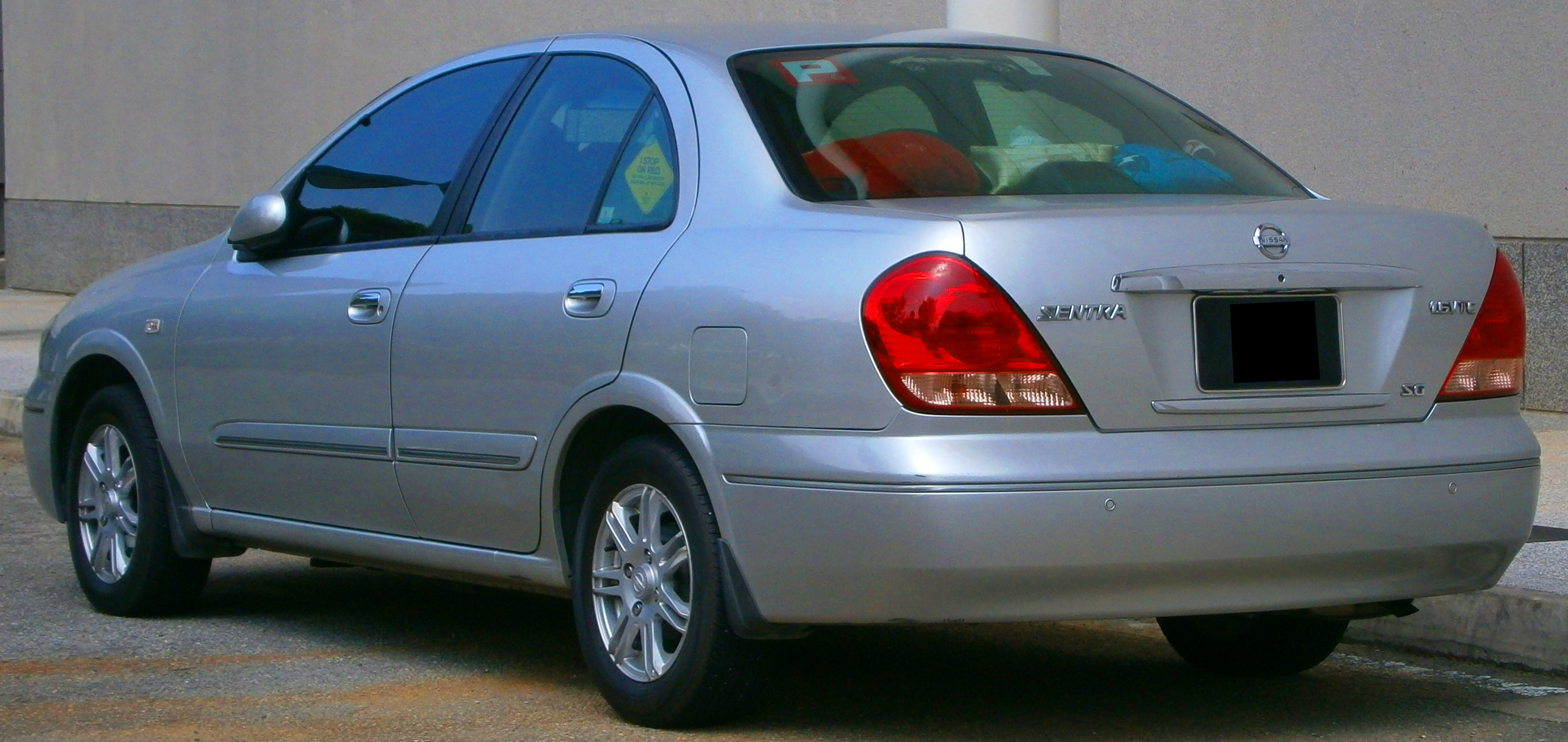
Nissan Sentra SG sedan (first facelift, Malaysia)

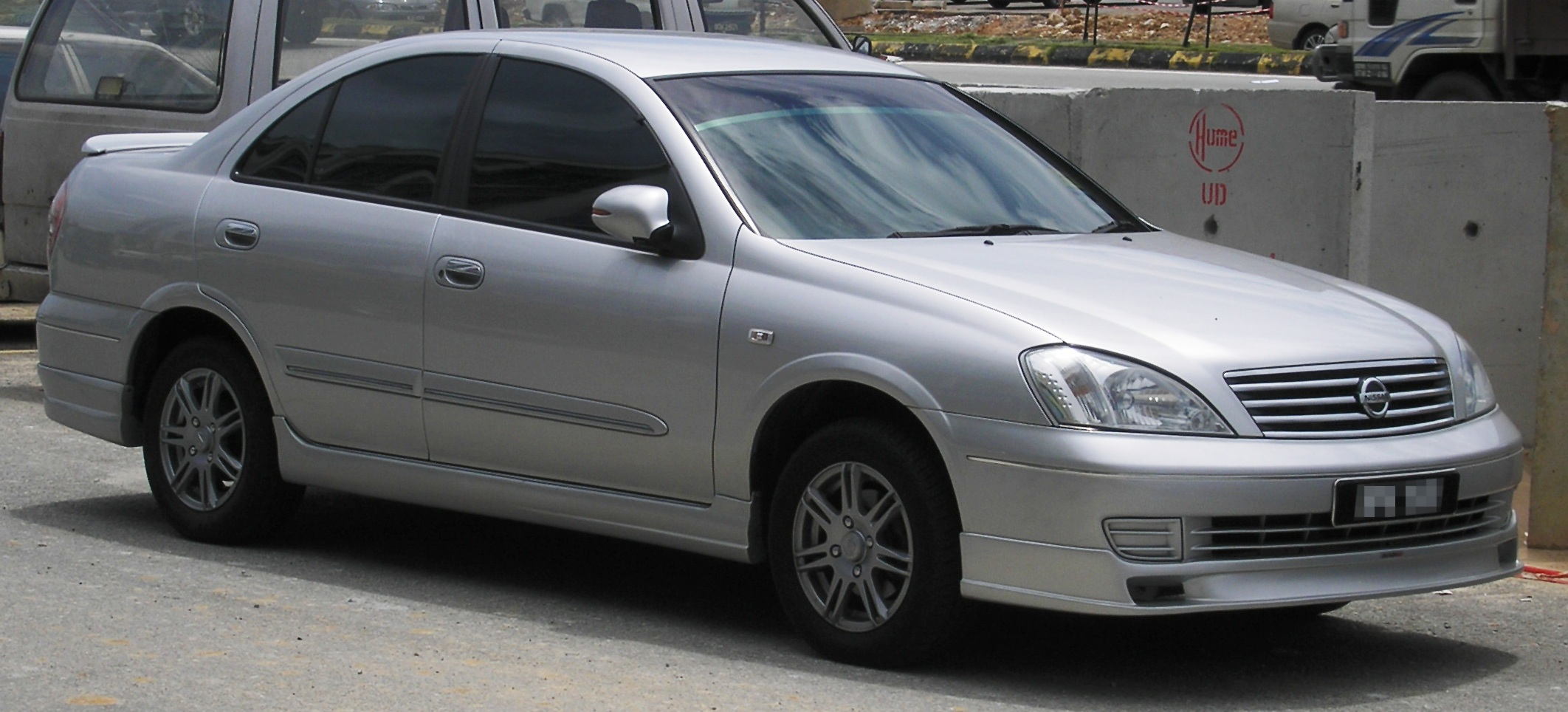

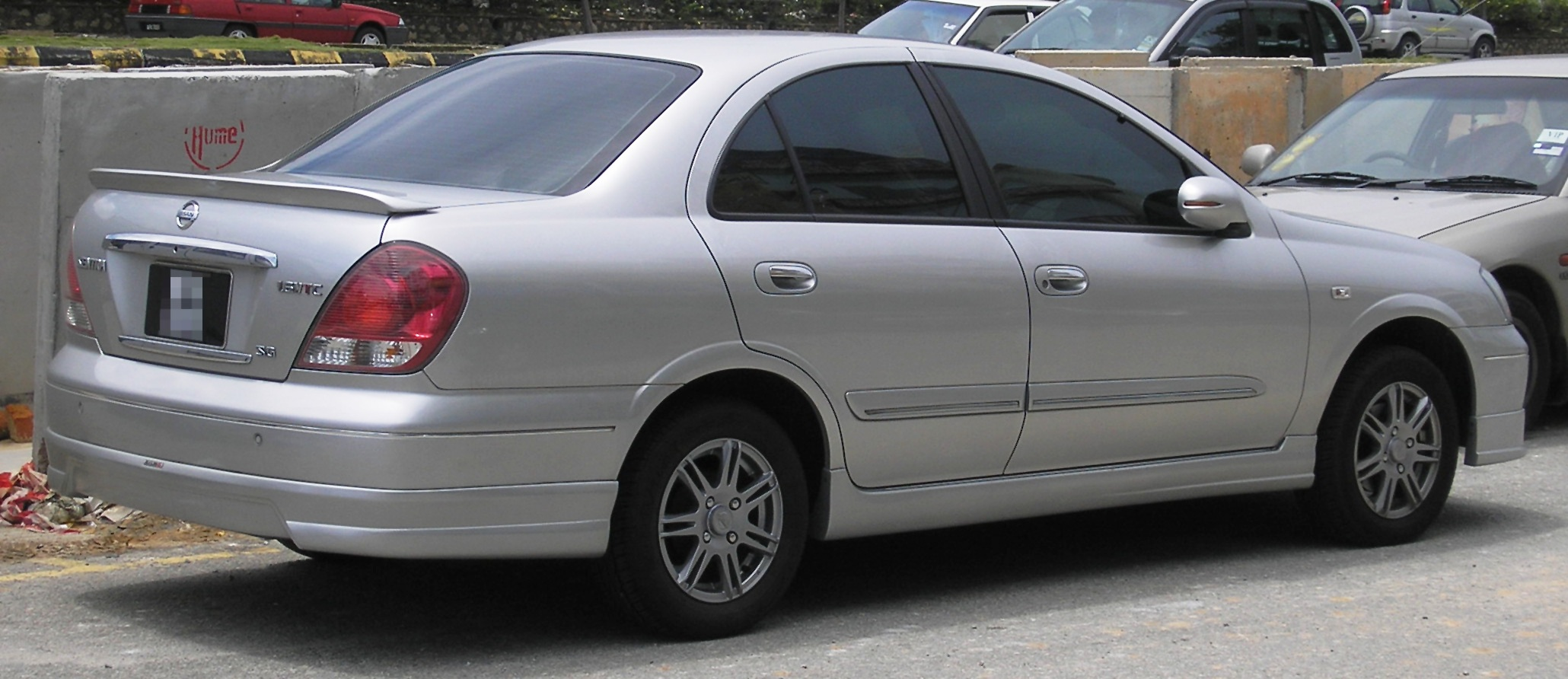
Nissan Sentra SG Sport sedan (second facelift, Malaysia)

In Japan, the Nissan Revival Plan was implemented, and saw the reorganization of Nissan's Japanese dealership network, introducing Nissan Red Stage as the sole provider of all Sunny/Pulsar vehicle platforms formerly available at Nissan Satio/Nissan Cherry/Nissan Prince locations. Engine choices consisted of the 1.5- QG15DE, 1.6- QG16DE, 1.8- QG18DE, and the 2.0-litre QR20DD. A five-speed manual transmission is only available for the 1.5-litre, the other models featuring a four-speed automatic transmission with the 2.0l motor mated to a CVT. The four-wheel drive version was only offered with the 1.8-litre model.

In Sri Lanka, Nissan sold the Bluebird Sylphy G10 as the Nissan Sunny N16 in two trims: EX saloon and Super Saloon. While there were differences in measurements and exteriors, the interiors were mostly the same. Nissan offered various models with different nameplates like Bluebird, Sylphy, and Cefiro, each having modified specifications. It's important to note that these nameplates didn't exactly match the global models with the same names. The EX saloon had a black grille and was offered with the 1.3 L QG13DE engine.

In Thailand, where the Sunny name was used, alongside the sedan, the five-door was also sold (imported from the UK). Consequently, each body style has a different front end. China, Singapore and Sri Lanka also received the sedan model only under the Sunny name. In China, it was produced by the Dongfeng Motor Company, a joint venture with Nissan.

In Singapore, the N16 succeeded the B15 model in the year 2000. It was available in two engine variants, both 1.5-litre and 1.6-litre. In 2004, a facelifted model was introduced. The facelifted model was only available with a 1.6-litre engine. It continued to be available for sale, until the year 2011. Both versions came in manual and automatic transmissions. Nissan Sunny was only sold in the sedan variant, imported from Japan.

In the Philippines, the pre-facelift N16 model was known as the Nissan Sentra Exalta (available from 2001 to 2003; Where the "Exalta" name was previously used at the luxurious versions of the B14 Sentra). This early model is similar to the JDM Bluebird Sylphy. Nissan Philippines then introduced a model with new headlights and tail lights. The Exalta name was dropped and was renamed back to Sentra. The B16 Sentra was introduced in the Philippines, where it is sold as the Sentra 200 and was sold alongside the Pulsar-based N16 model for awhile. Sales ended in the Philippine market in 2014.

In Indonesia, Malaysia, the Philippines and Taiwan, the Bluebird Sylphy is sold as the Nissan Sentra. For Indonesia, Nissan sold the Sentra between 2002 and 2004 in small numbers for private buyers in a single trim level, the 1.8 Super Saloon. It featured standard ABS, dual airbags, leather interior, and CD player with MP3. The facelifted model N16, the Sunny Neo was powered by the 1.6-litre engine was and intended for taxi use only.

After the Japanese production ended in 2005, the N16 maintained in production in Malaysia and the Philippines as the Sentra—albeit, sporting new front-end styling treatment. The models for Malaysia are SG and SG-L, with the choice of Comfort or Luxury Package. The Sunny continued to be offered in Singapore until 2011 in the following trim levels: EX Saloon, Super Saloon, and Luxury Edition. Exclusive for the local market, the Malaysian-built N16 was made available until 2014 as the Sentra Sport 1.6 in Comfort and Luxury trim levels. It is unrelated to the North American Sentra.

==== Australia ====
In Australia and New Zealand, Nissan continued to use the Pulsar name for the N16 series. The four-door sedan sourced from Japan and the five-door hatchback from the UK (a rebadged Almera) were offered. Consequently, each body style has a different front end.

Trim levels were LX, ST, Q and Ti. Engine choices consisted of the 1.6- and 1.8-litre petrols. Power output was 88 kW (118 hp) and 94 kW (126 hp). The four-door was available in four trim levels—an LX with the 1.6, the ST and Ti with the 1.8-litre engine as standard, and a Q version with the 1.8-litre and a sportier level of trim, including a rear spoiler and alloy wheels. In the five-door range there was no LX version. Nissan launched the hatchback model with the ST trim level and a sporty Q version. As such, all hatches were 1.8-litre powered. The base-model LX sedan came with a driver's airbag, air-conditioning, remote locking and power mirrors, although no anti-lock brakes (ABS) or power windows were offered. The ST five-door gained an extra front airbag, whereas the four-door model did not have one as standard. In Ti form, the four-door gained both front airbags, ABS, climate control air-conditioning, alloy wheels and power windows. The Q model was similar to the Ti four-door, although there were slight discrepancies between the sedan and hatch, with the latter version having an extra air-bag and 15-inch alloy wheels versus the 14-inch alloys on the sedan.

Sedan

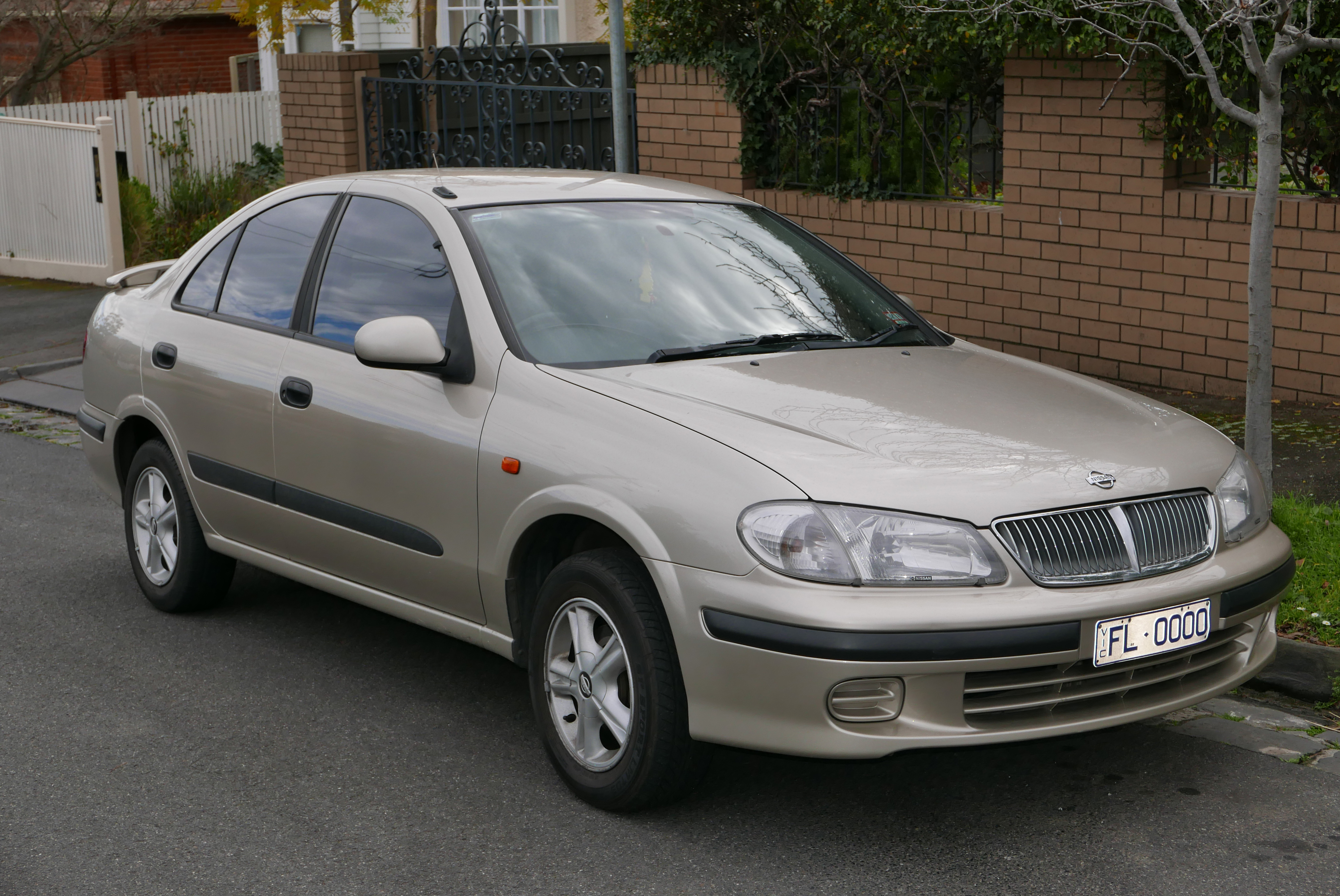
2000–2003 Nissan Pulsar ST-L sedan (Australia)

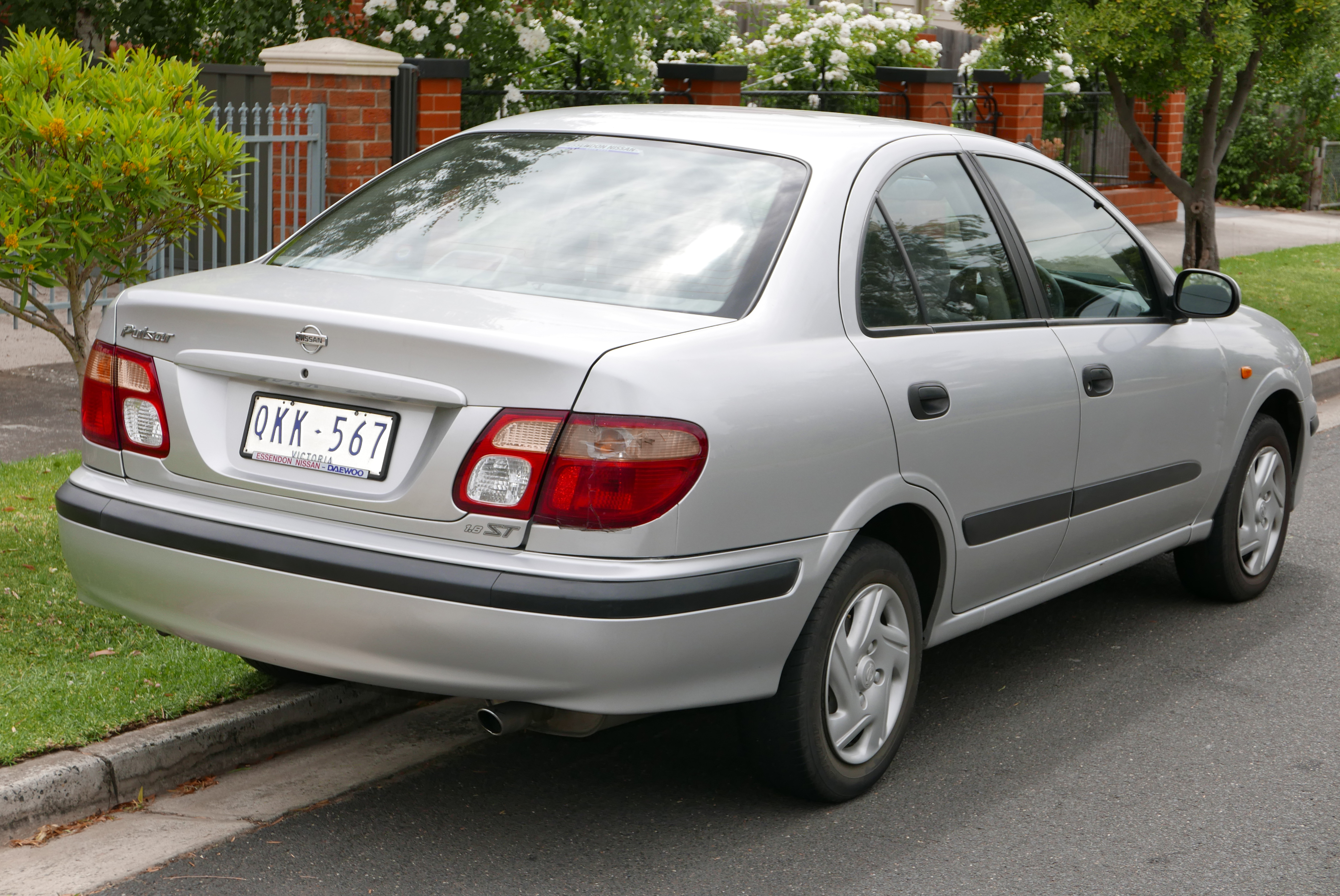
2000–2003 Nissan Pulsar 1.8 ST sedan (Australia)

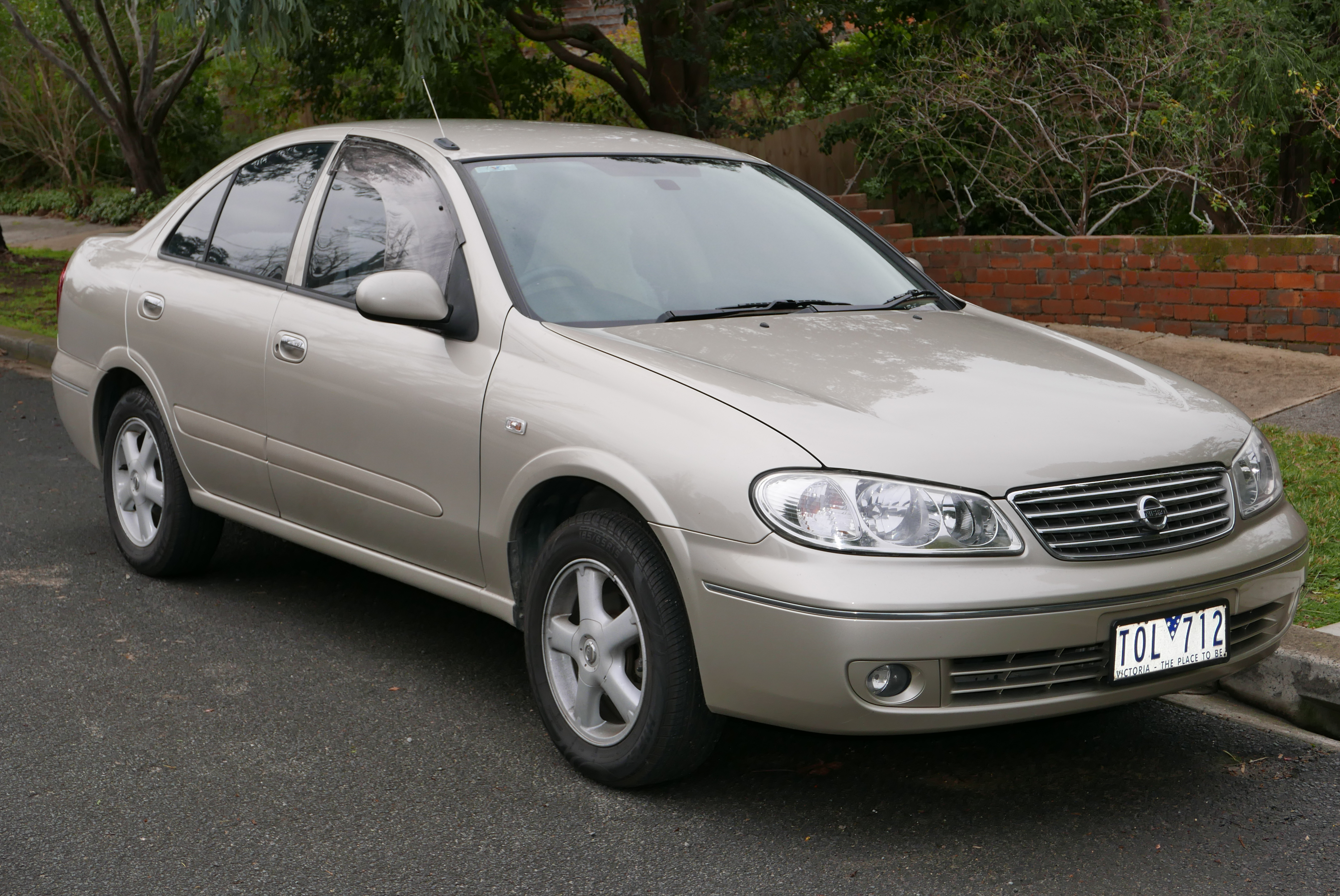
2003–2005 Nissan Pulsar 1.8 ST-L sedan (Australia)

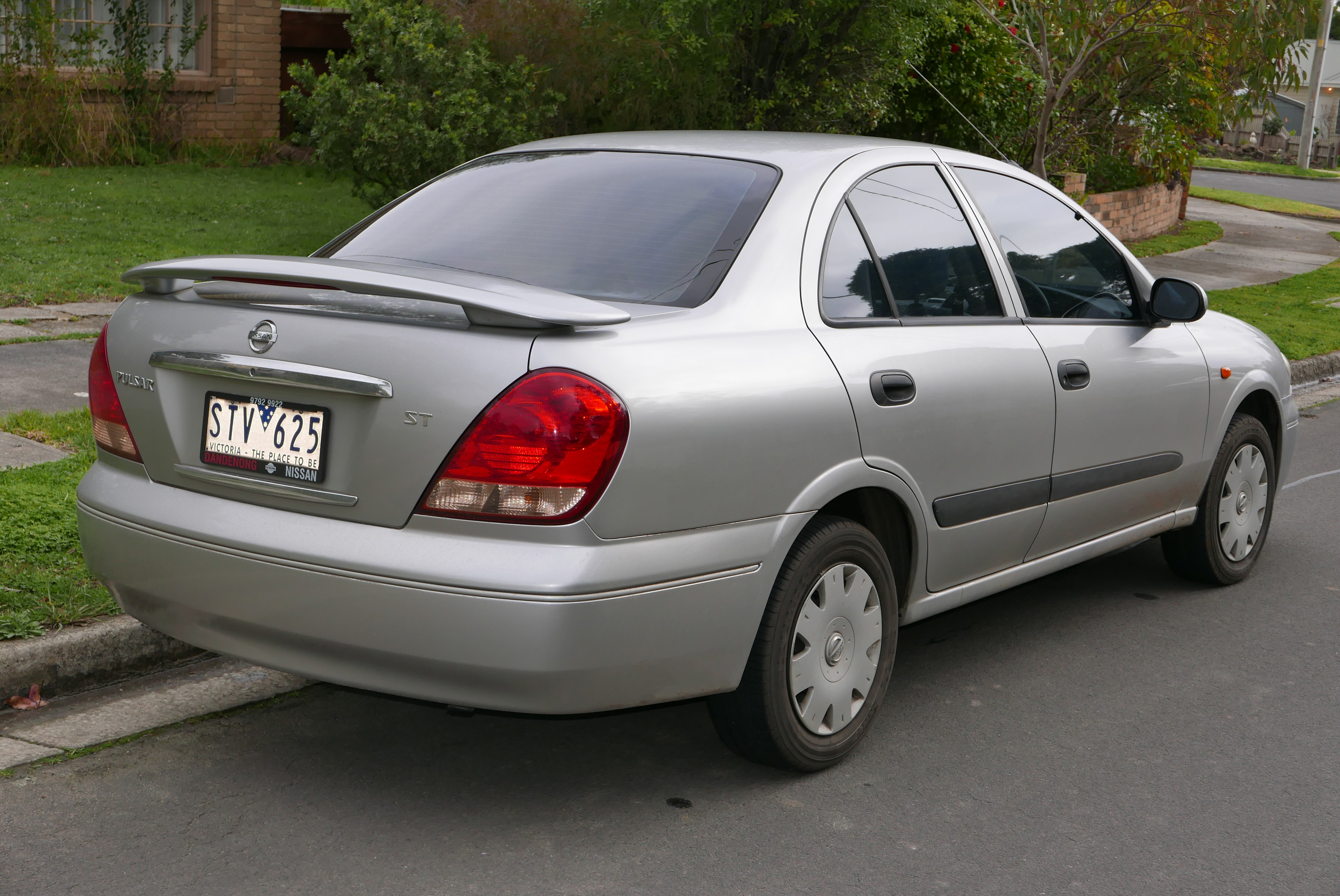
2003–2005 Nissan Pulsar ST sedan (Australia)

Hatchback

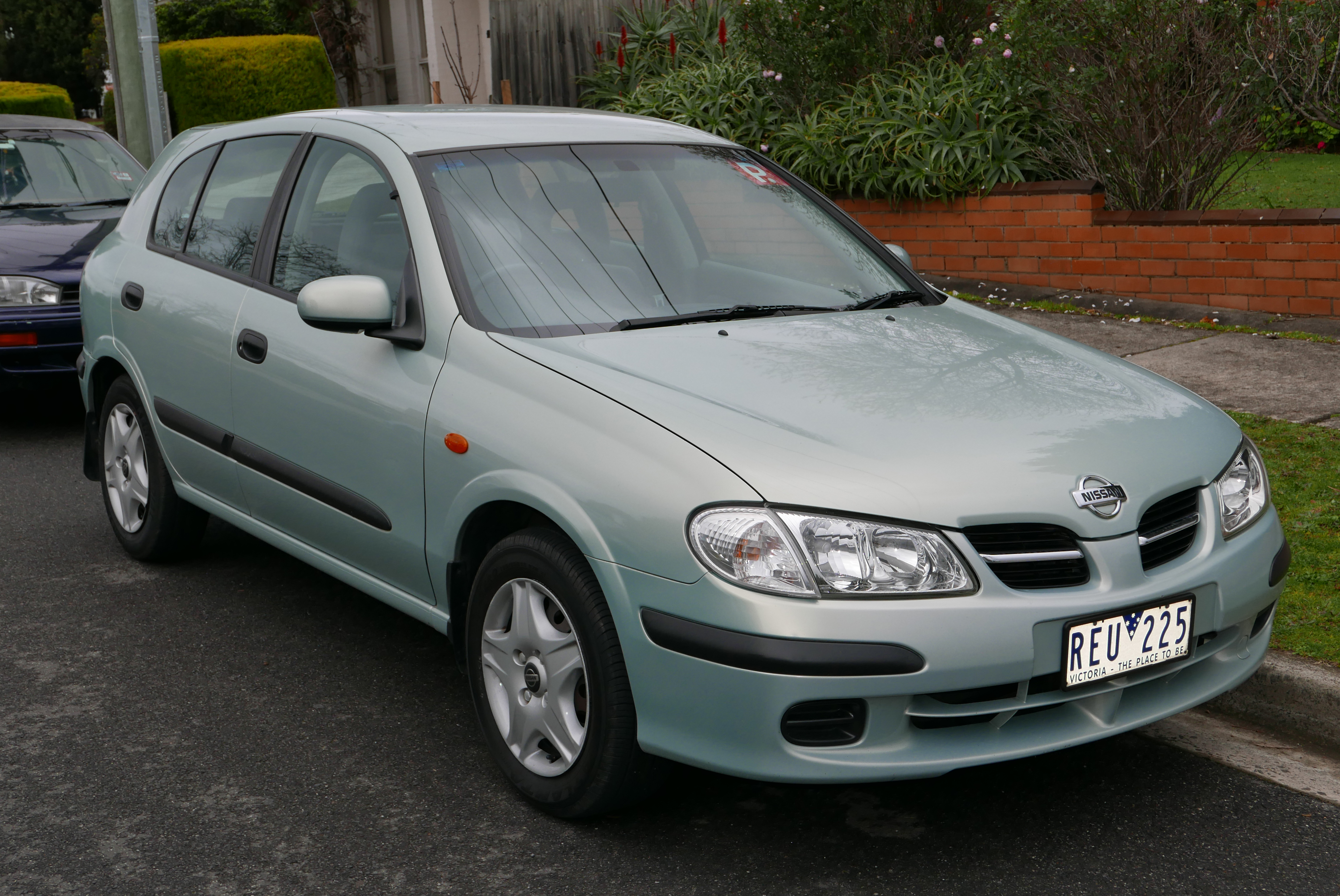
2001–2002 Nissan Pulsar 1.8 ST 5-door (Australia)

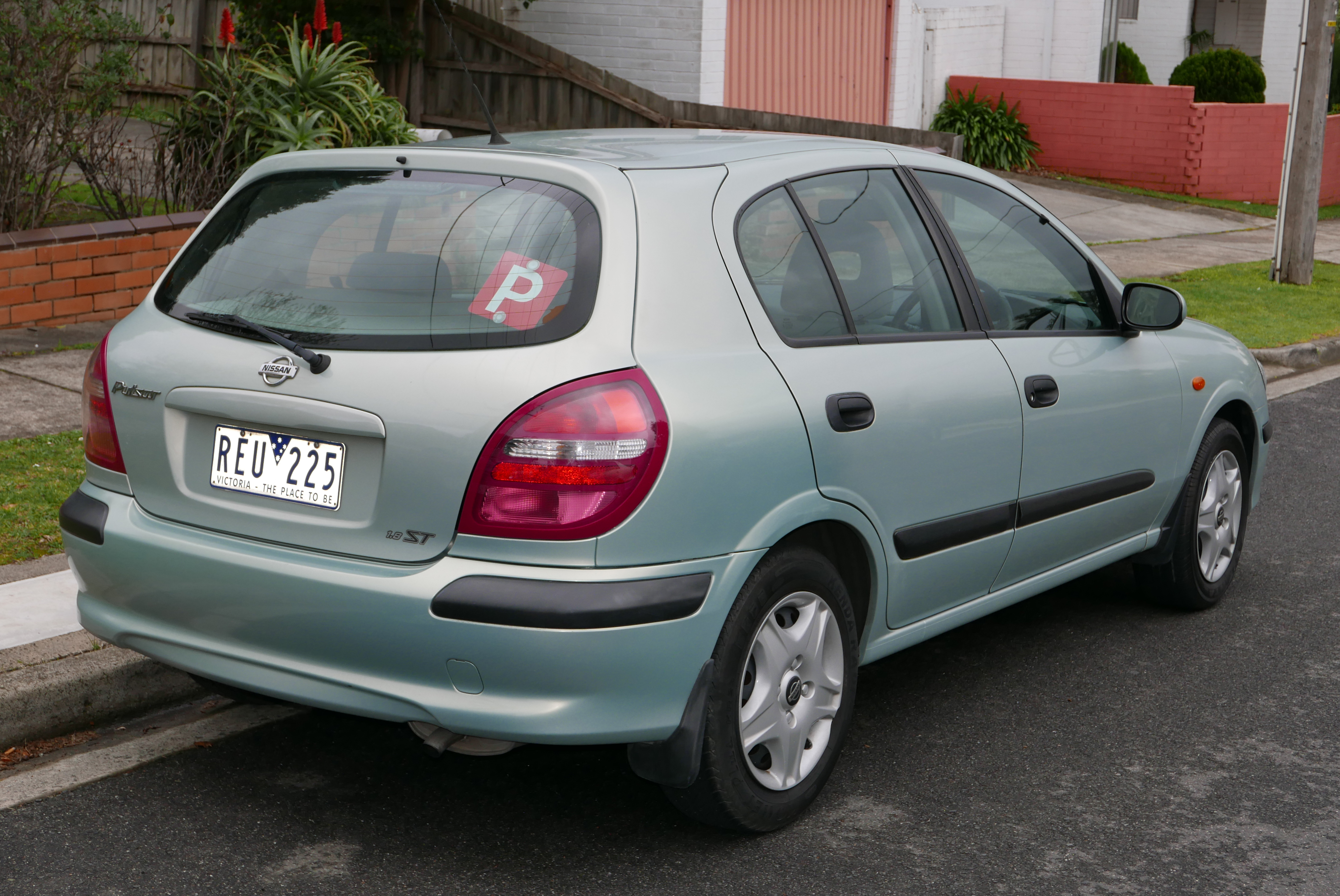
2001–2002 Nissan Pulsar 1.8 ST 5-door (Australia)

==== Europe ====
For the European market, Nissan sold the N16 series as the second generation Nissan Almera from 2000. Produced in the United Kingdom, the Almera range comprised three- and five-door hatchbacks and the less common sedan. Compared to other markets, the European-manufactured cars featured unique frontal styling — while the headlamps remained common with Japanese models — a restyled grille, bonnet, and bumper did feature. A facelift was released in 2003, with production continuing until the Almera's demise in 2006.

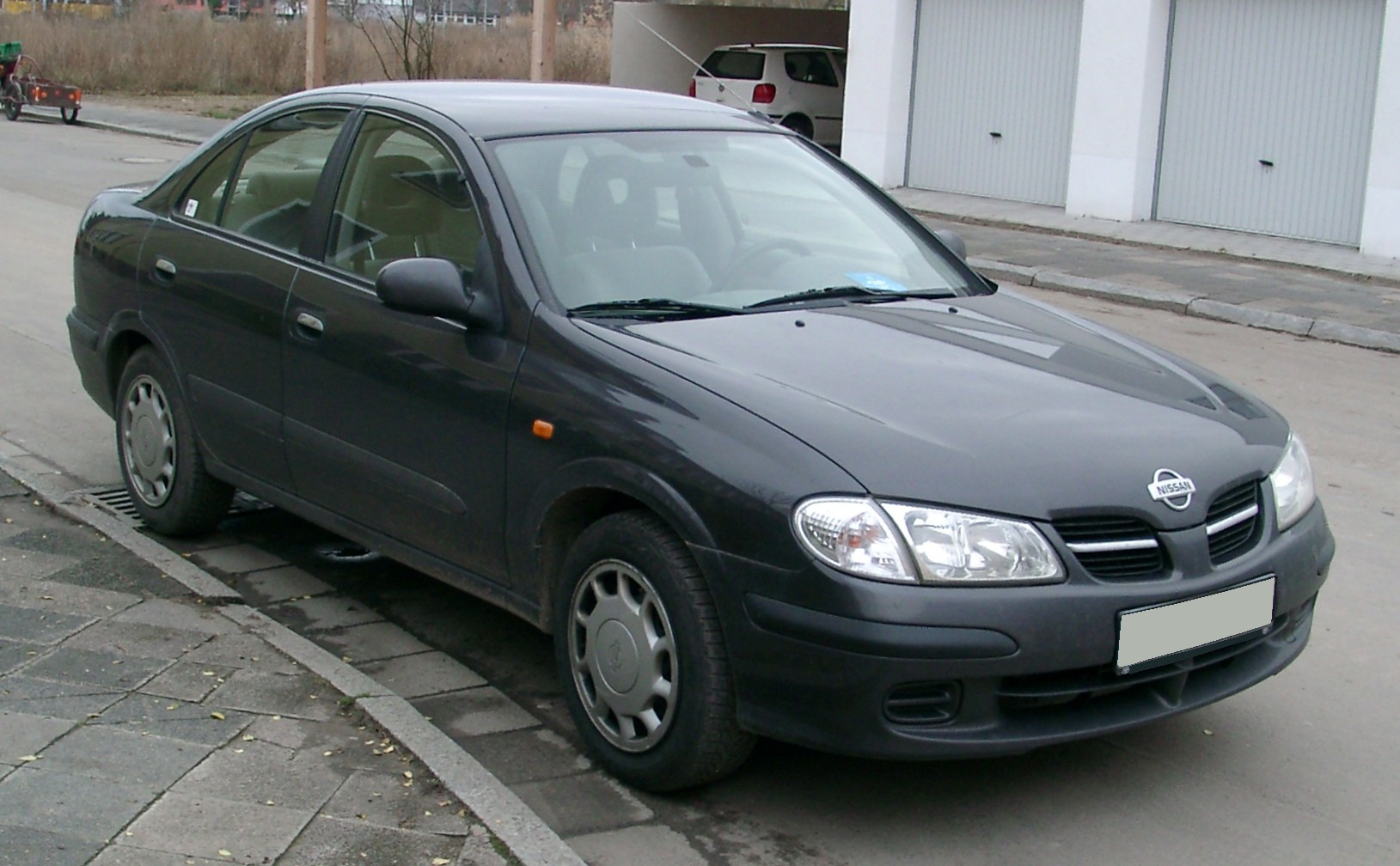
2000–2003 Nissan Almera sedan

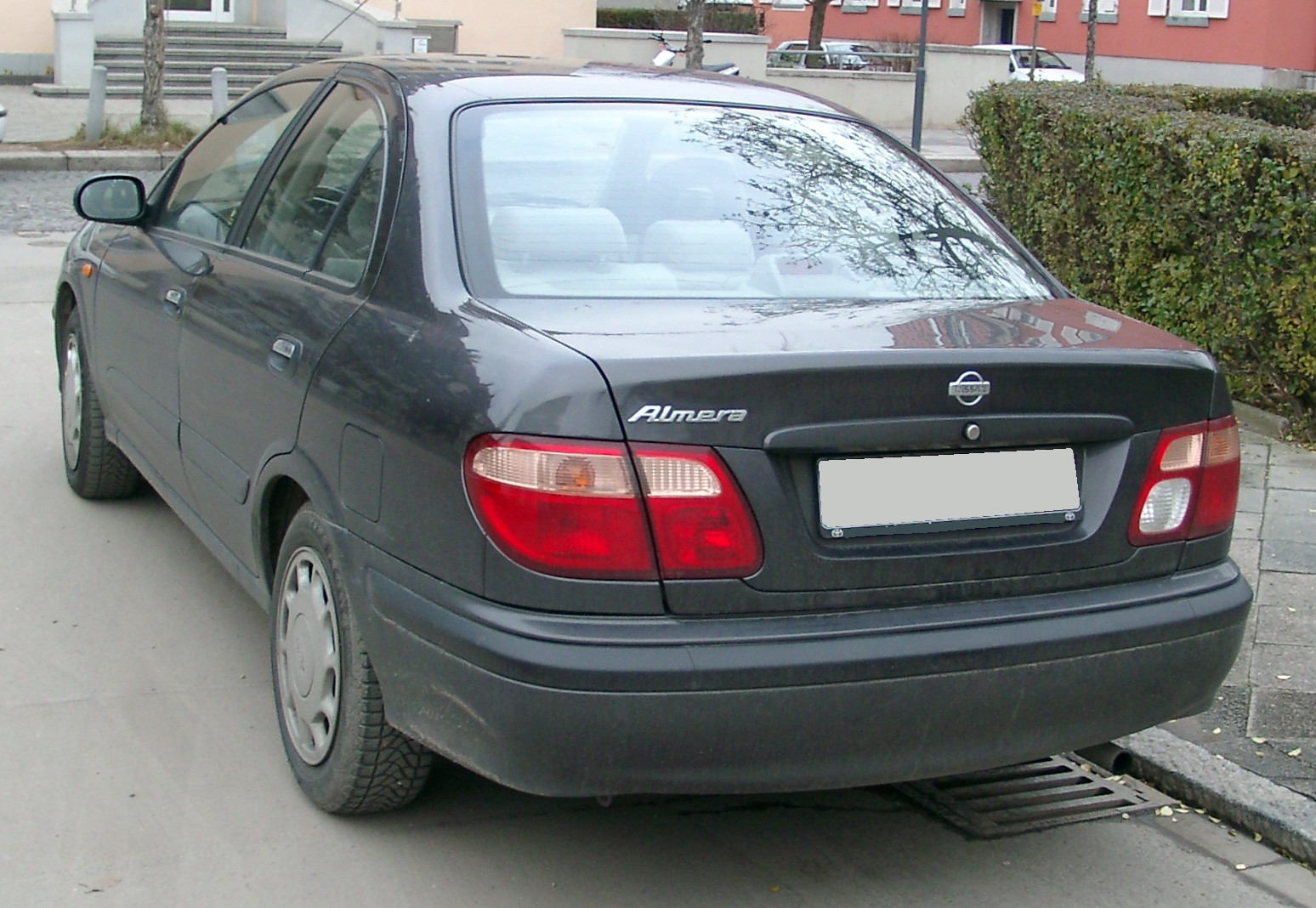
2000–2003 Nissan Almera sedan

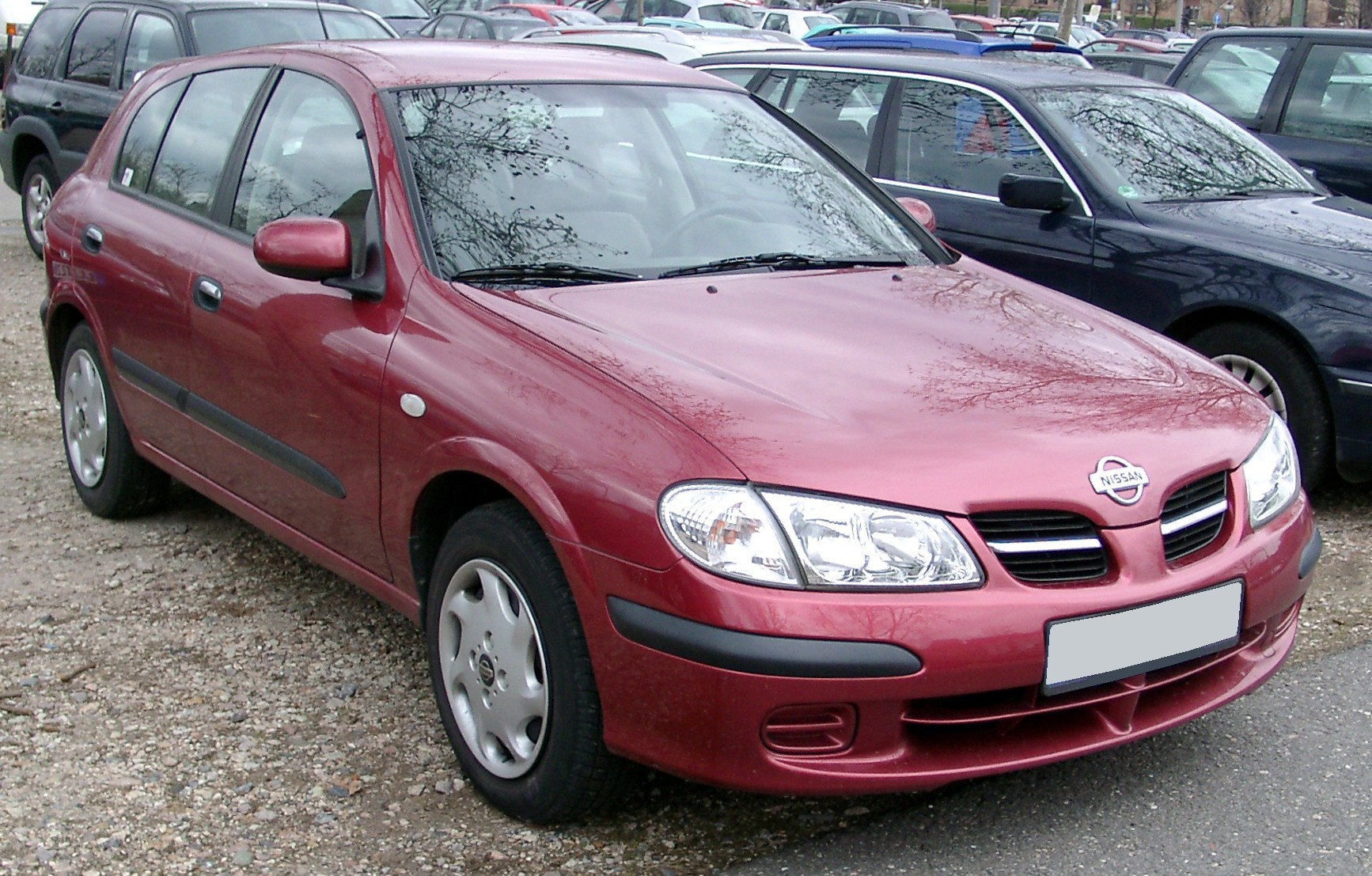
2000–2003 Nissan Almera 5-door

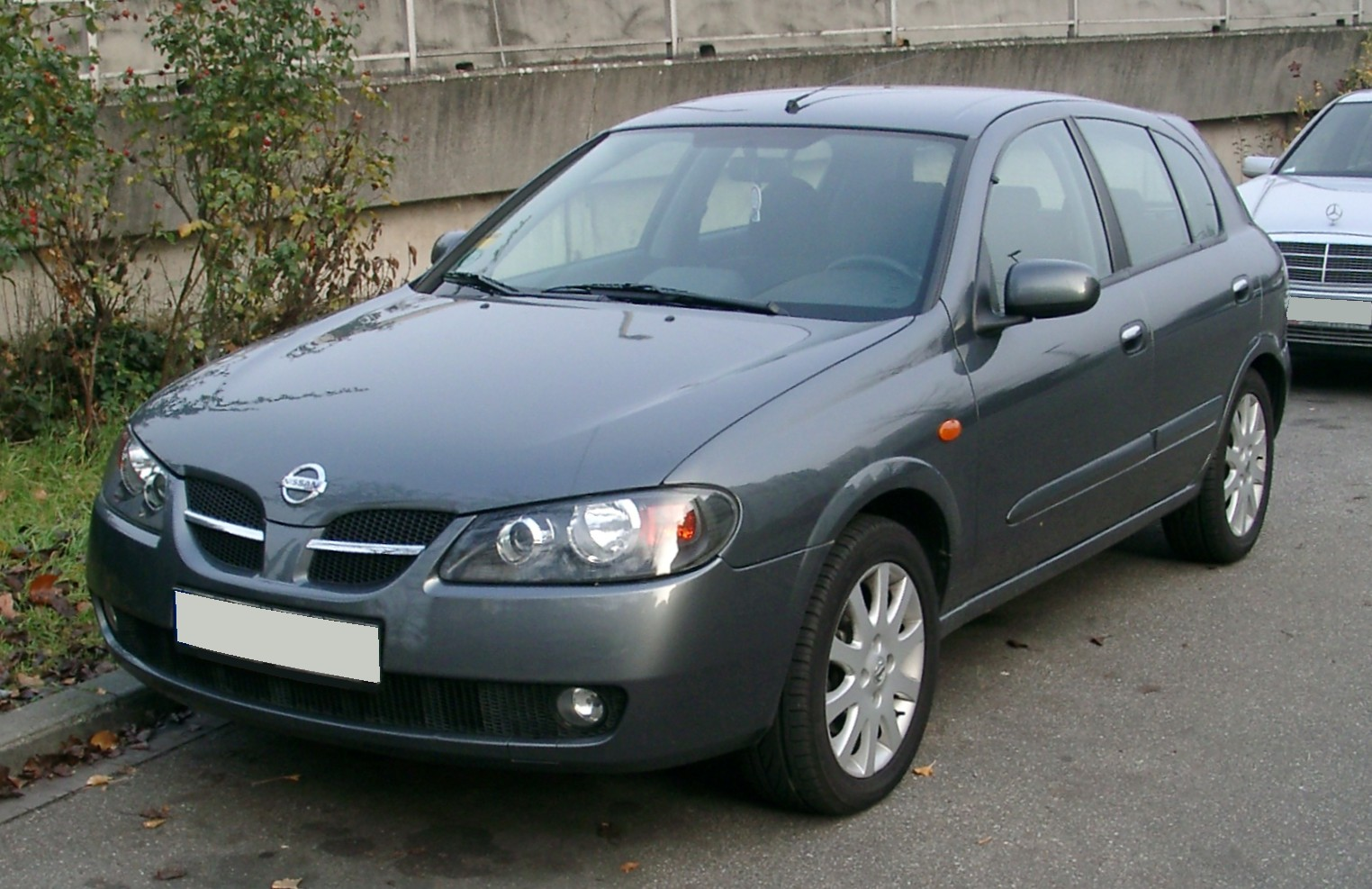
2003–2006 Nissan Almera 5-door

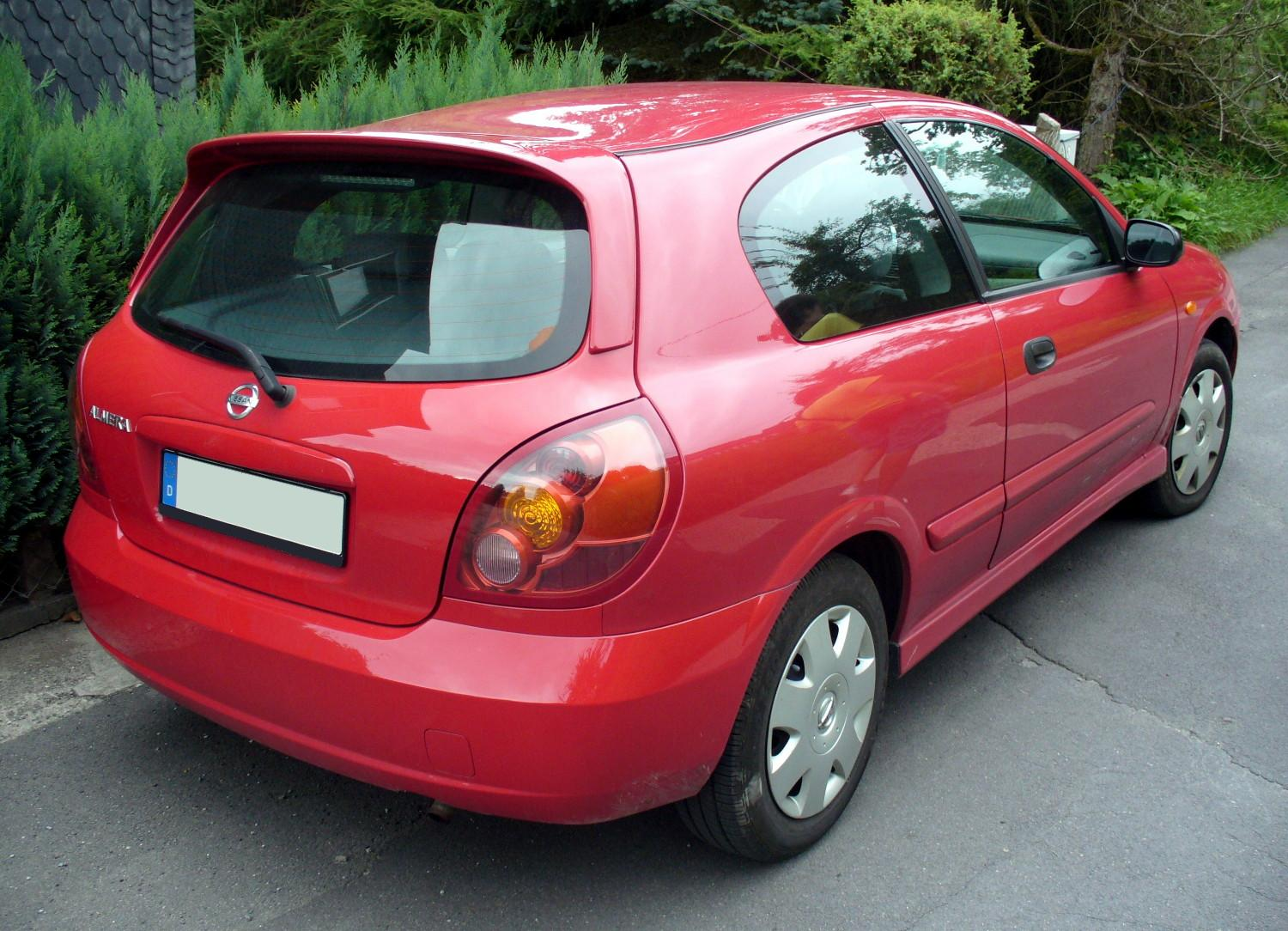
2003–2006 Nissan Almera 3-door

=== Renault Samsung SM3 ===
From 2006, a derivative of the Bluebird Sylphy, the Renault Samsung SM3 was sold in Ukraine and Russia as the Nissan Almera Classic. The same year, the car was launched in Central and South America as Nissan Almera, (except in Chile where it was sold as a Samsung). Also since 2007, the Renault Samsung SM3 is sold as the Nissan Sunny in the Middle East, with a single trim that comes with a 1.5-litre engine. The Samsung SM3 is also sold as the Renault Scala in Mexico, Egypt and Colombia.

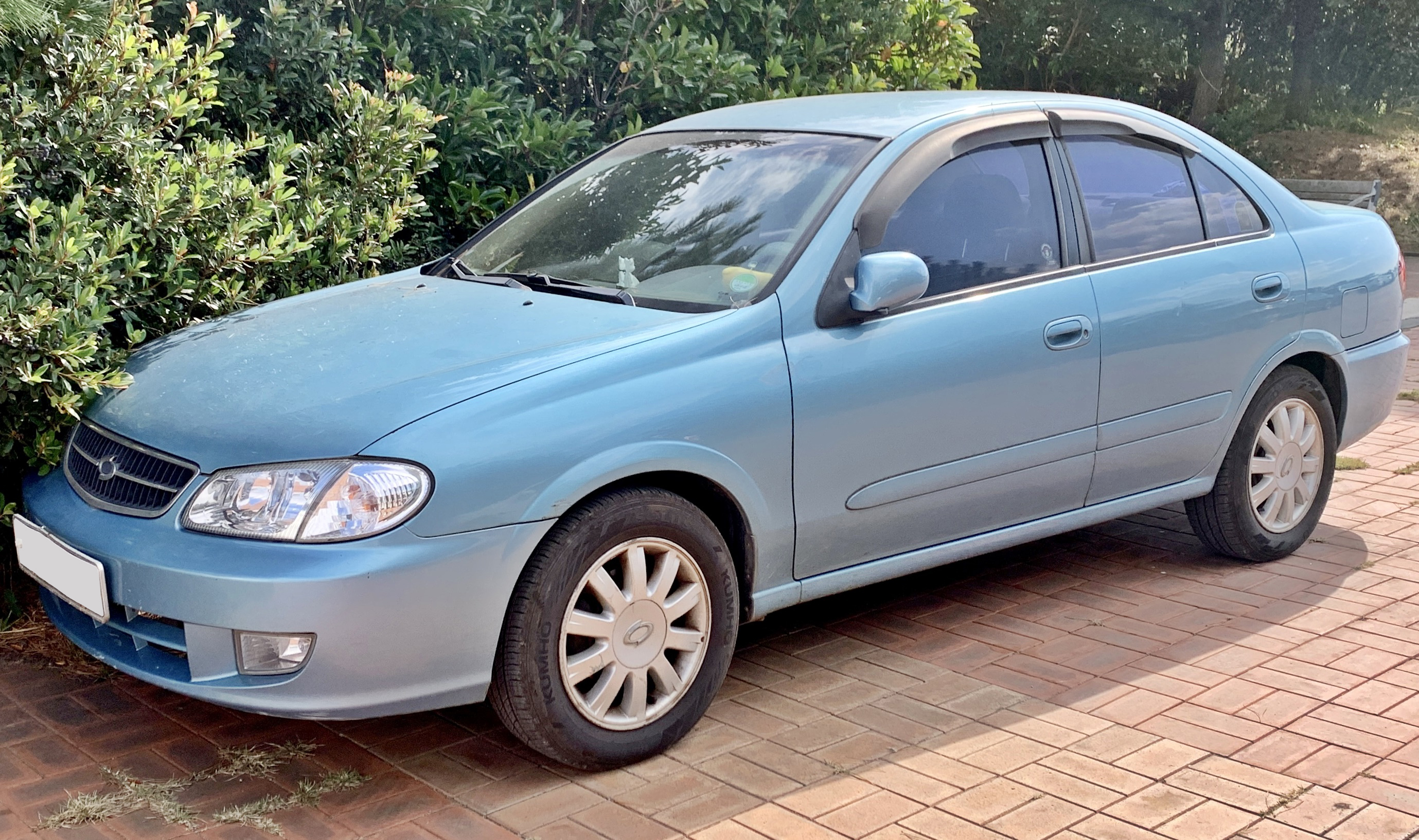
Renault Samsung SM3

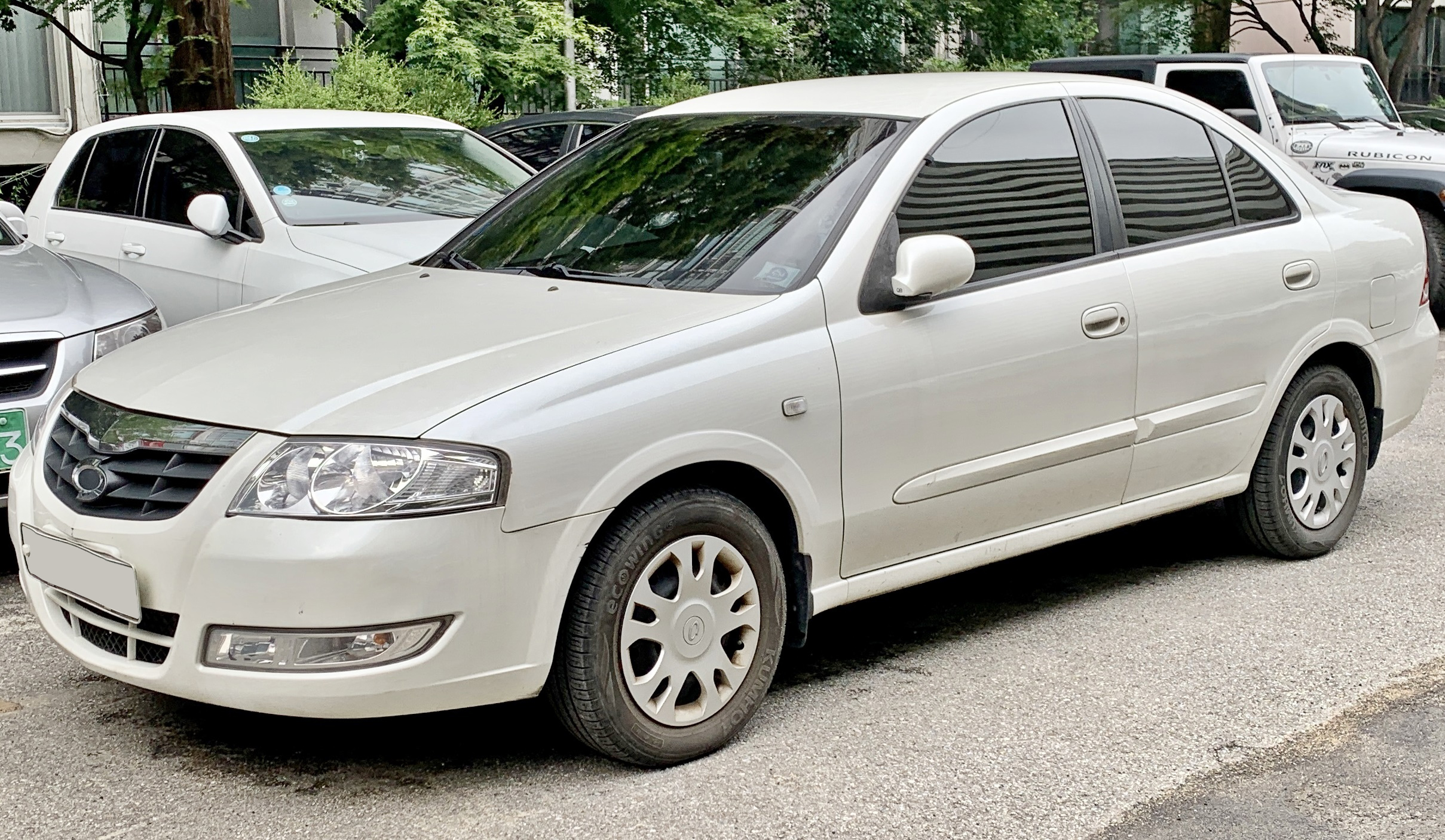
Renault Samsung SM3 (facelift)

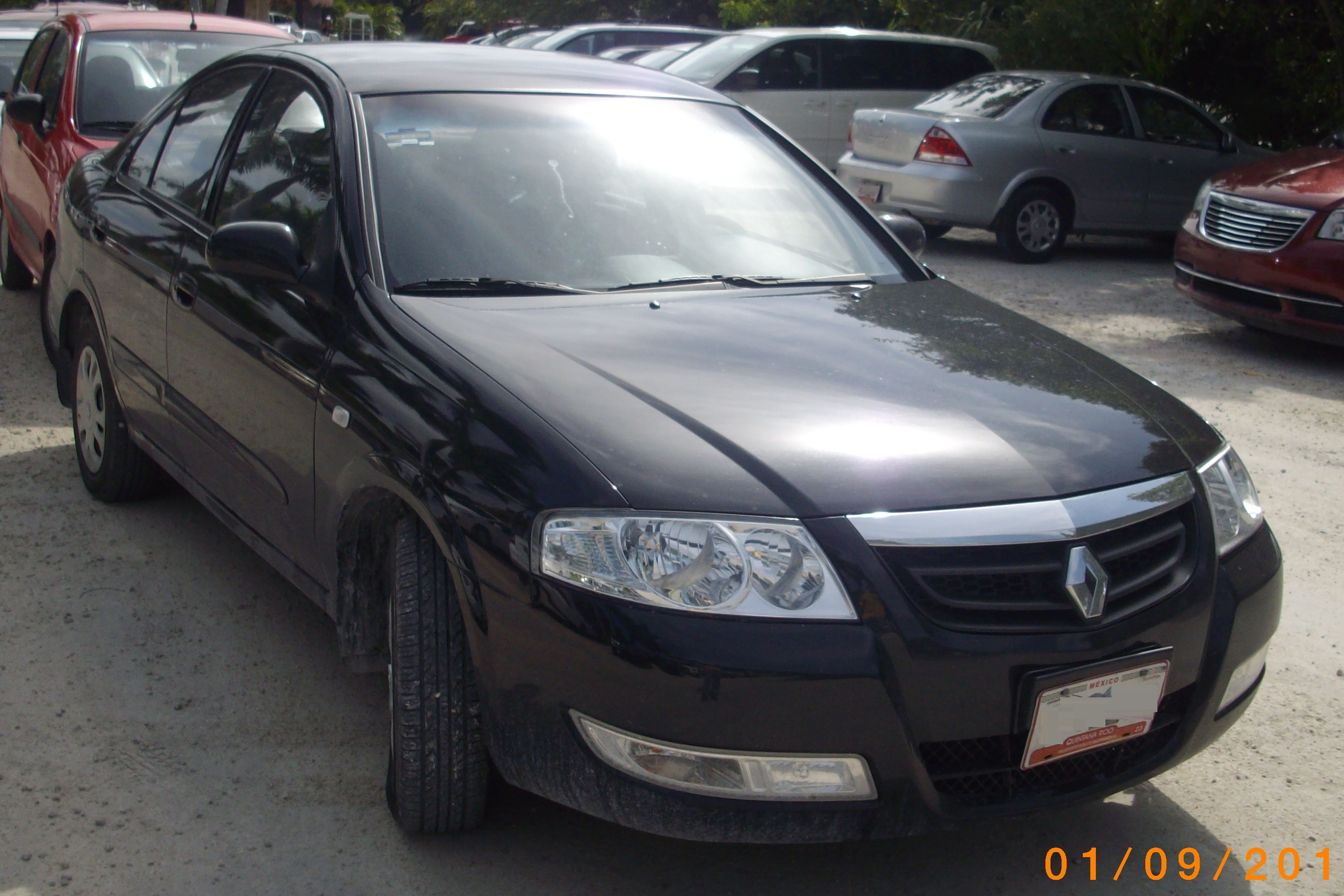
Renault Scala (Mexico)

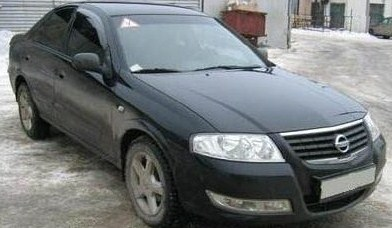
Nissan Almera Classic (Russia)

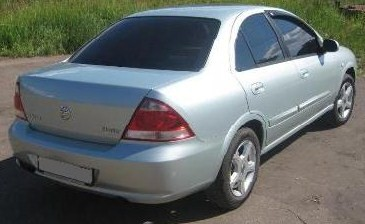
Nissan Almera Classic (Russia)

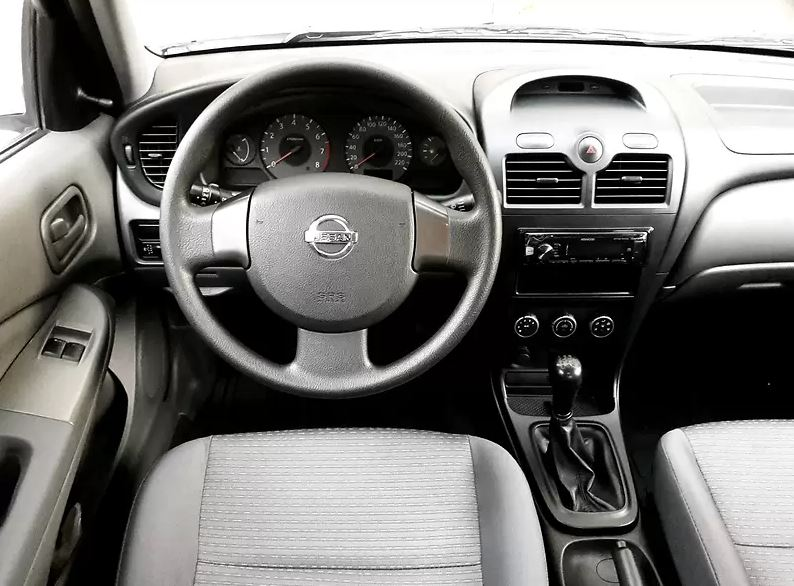
Nissan Almera Classic interior (Russia)

=== Safety ===
ANCAP test results* Nissan Pulsar 5 door hatch (2003)
Test	Score
Overall	3 /5 stars
Frontal offset	7.96/16
Side impact	14.38/16
Pole	Not Assessed
Seat belt reminders	0/3
Whiplash protection	Not Assessed
Pedestrian protection	Not Assessed
Electronic stability control	Not Assessed

== Second generation (G11/G15; 2005) ==
Second generation
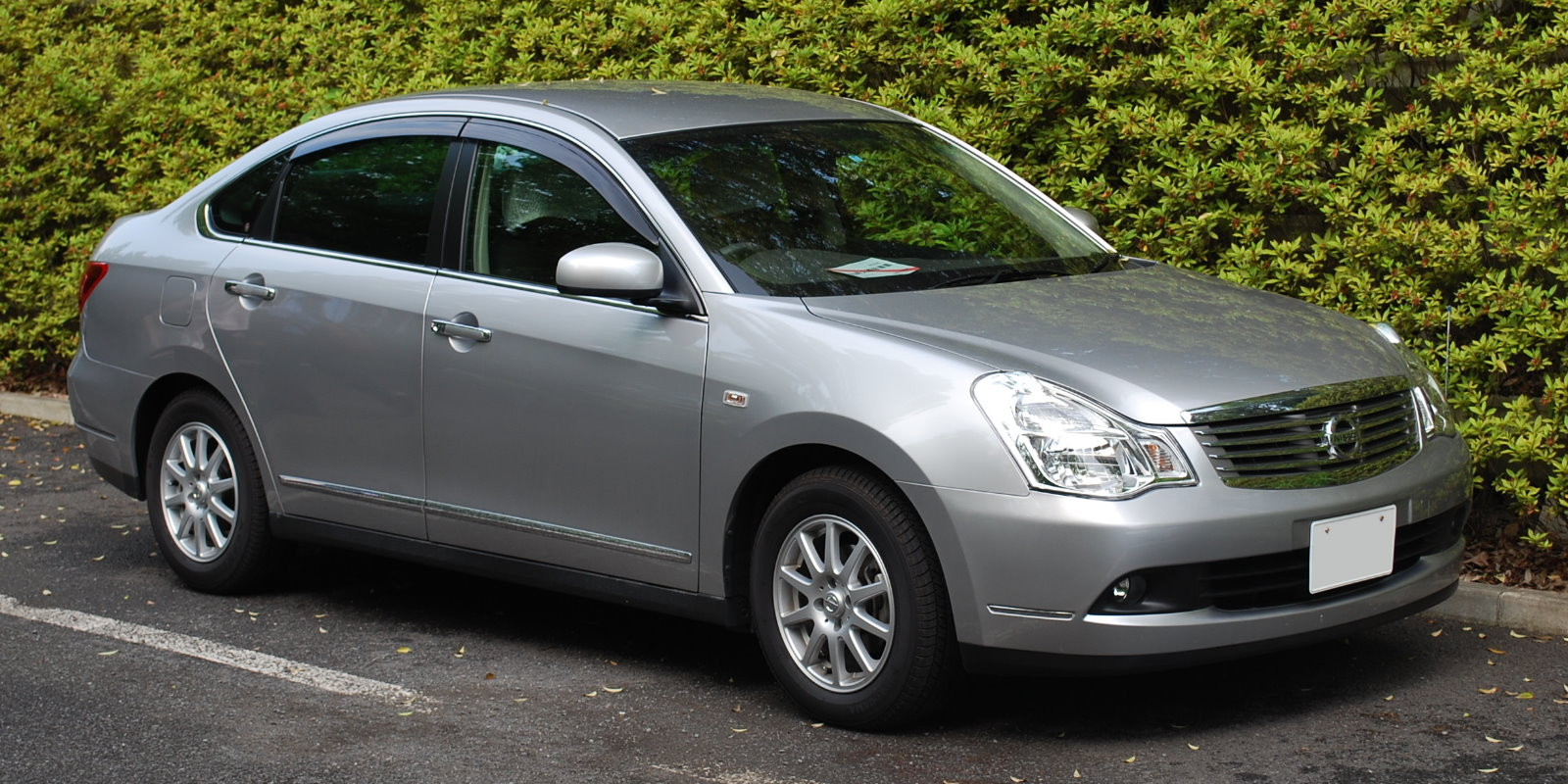
- Nissan Bluebird Sylphy (pre-facelift)

Overview
- Model code: G11; G15 (Russia)
- Also called: Nissan Almera (Russia); Nissan Bluebird (Taiwan); Nissan Bluebird Sylphy; Dongfeng Junfeng E11K (EV in China)
- Production: 2005–2012 (Japan); 2006–2018 (China; Nissan Bluebird Sylphy); 2018–2019 (China; Dongfeng Junfeng E11K); 2008–2014 (Malaysia); 2012–2018 (Russia)
- Assembly: Japan: Yokosuka, Kanagawa (Oppama Plant); China: Guangzhou (Dongfeng Nissan); Malaysia: Serendah (TCMA); Russia: Tolyatti; Taiwan: Miaoli (Yulon)

Body and chassis
- Layout: Front-engine, front-wheel-drive
- Platform: Nissan B platform; Dacia B0 platform (Russia)
- Related: Nissan Tiida/Latio/Versa (C11); Nissan AD/Wingroad (Y12); Nissan Livina (L10/L11); Nissan Note (E11); Dongfeng Fengshen A60

Powertrain
- Engine: Petrol: 1.5 L HR15DE I4; 1.6 L HR16DE I4; 2.0 L MR20DE I4
- Transmission: 5-speed manual 4-speed automatic CVT automatic

Dimensions
- Wheelbase: 2,700 mm (106.3 in)
- Length: 4,610–4,665 mm (181.5–183.7 in)
- Width: 1,695–1,700 mm (66.7–66.9 in)
- Height: 1,505–1,510 mm (59.3–59.4 in)
- Curb weight: 1,160–1,250 kg (2,557–2,756 lb)

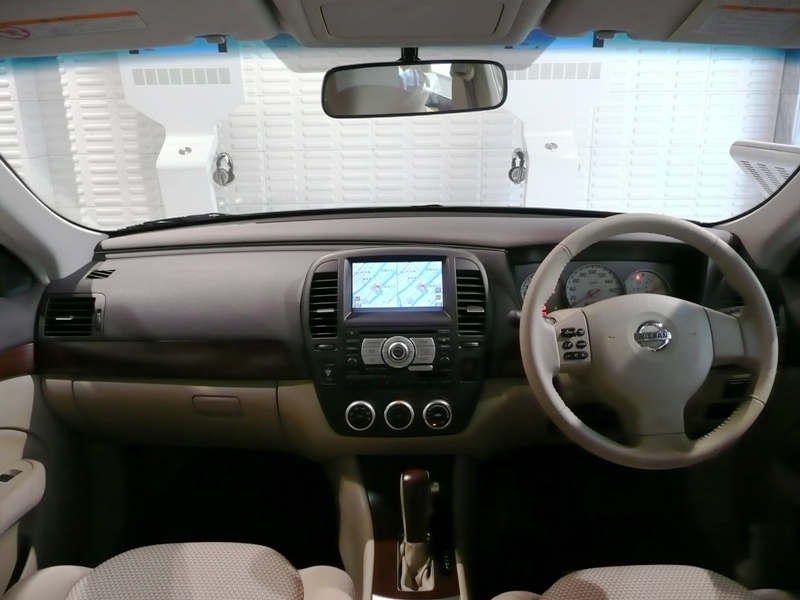
Interior

The second-generation model was launched at the 2005 Tokyo Motor Show. It uses an extended version of the B platform shared with the C11 Tiida and L10 Livina. Interior space is larger due to its enlarged wheelbase (2,700 mm) and the biggest boot (504 liters) in its class. In Japan, it replaced the Nissan Sunny (B15) and the previous Bluebird Sylphy as Nissan's compact sedan.

The Bluebird Sylphy uses the same engine as the Nissan Tiida/Versa/Latio, which is the 1.5-litre HR15DE engine and the all-new 2.0-litre MR20DE engine. The 2.0-litre version uses Nissan's Xtronic CVT.

Starting from 2008, the Bluebird Sylphy was also available for overseas markets as the Nissan Sylphy. The Sylphy was sold in China from 2006 to 2018 under the Sylphy Classic name. In terms of styling, the Chinese variant had amber turn signals on the front compared to clear ones sold in international markets. The rear was the same style as international variants until 2008 where it was given a facelift for 2009. The rear was given new taillights as well as an extra fog lamp on the bottom of the rear bumper. Trim levels consisted of the 1.6XE, 2.0XE, 2.0XL, 2.0XV and 2.0XV Navi. Engine and gearbox options consisted of the 1.6-liter HR16DE and the 2.0-litre MR20DE paired to a 5-speed manual, 4-speed automatic, or a CVT gearbox. Production for the Classic Sylphy ended in late 2018 after a shortened 2019 model year was produced. The G11 generation Sylphy was rebadged by Dongfeng and engineered into an electric vehicle starting from 2018, with the model renamed to E11K under the Junfeng electric car sub-brand. The E11K is available with a 451 km range 60.43 kW battery and a 405km range 57.757 kW battery as of 2022. Styling-wise, the E11K still retains the exterior styling of the 2009 to 2018 Nissan Bluebird Sylphy; it remained in production with no further facelifts as of late 2022.

The Sylphy was also sold in some Southeast Asian countries such as Malaysia and Taiwan. The Yulon Motor Company of Taiwan manufactured the Bluebird Sylphy and sold it as the Nissan Bluebird.

In Malaysia, the G11 Sylphy launched in June 2008. Two variants were offered: Comfort and Luxury. Both variants were powered by Nissan's MR20DE engine paired to a CVT. In June 2009, 'Tuned by Impul' accessories were made available and consisted of a front grille, front and rear lips, side skirts, a rear wing spoiler, suspension and alloy wheels. In January 2010, a new variant dubbed 'Luxury Navi Package' offered navigation and a reverse camera. In March 2012, the facelift G11 Sylphy was launched in Malaysia and was available with three variants: 2.0 XL Comfort and 2.0 XL Luxury and 2.0 XV Premium. In June 2012, revised 'Tuned by Impul' accessories were launched.

In Russia, the Bluebird Sylphy was available between 2012 and 2018 as the Nissan Almera. Production started in fall of 2012 in the AvtoVAZ plant in Tolyatti. The car was available with the 1.6-liter 75 kW (102 hp) engine and either a five-speed manual or four-speed automatic transmission. It shared the same dashboard as well as the interior components from the Renault Logan.

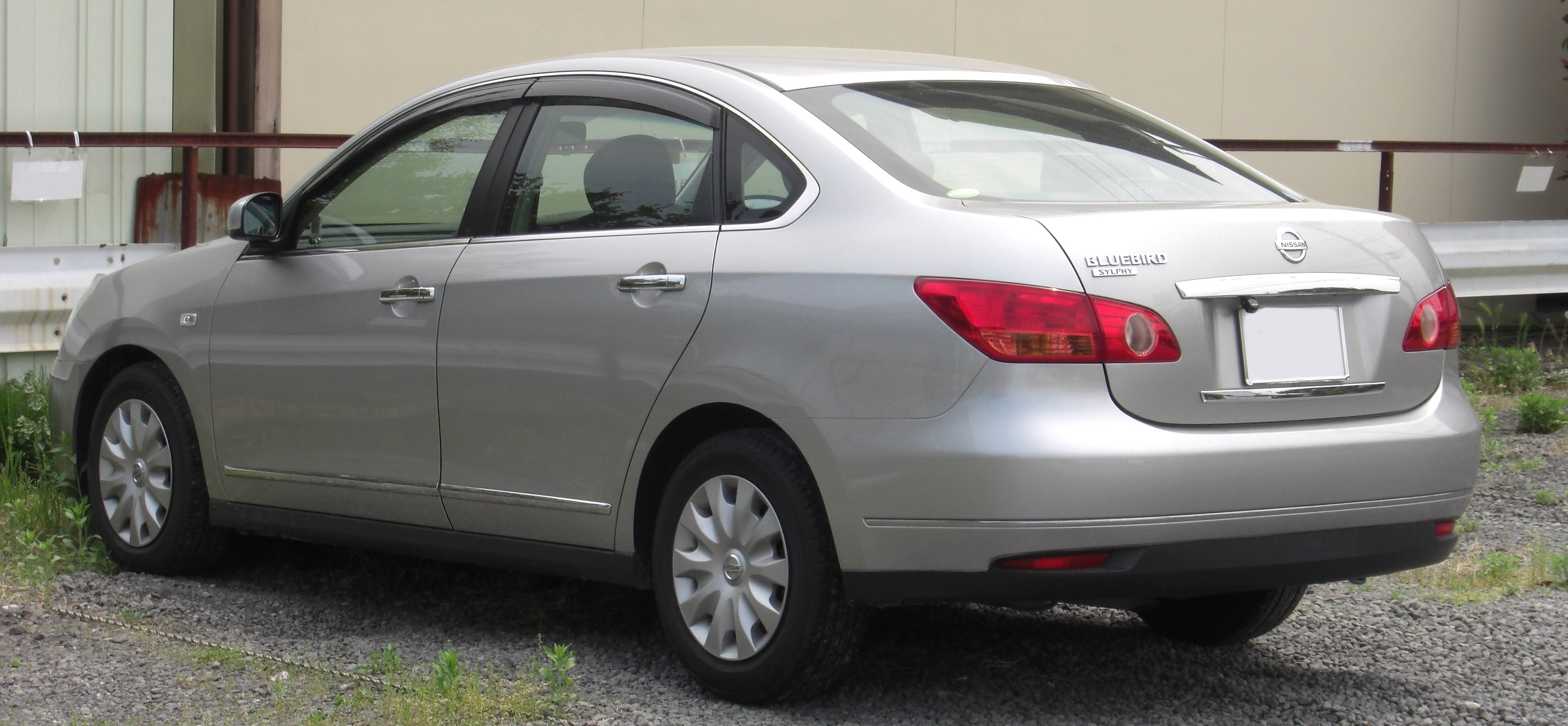
Rear (pre-facelift)

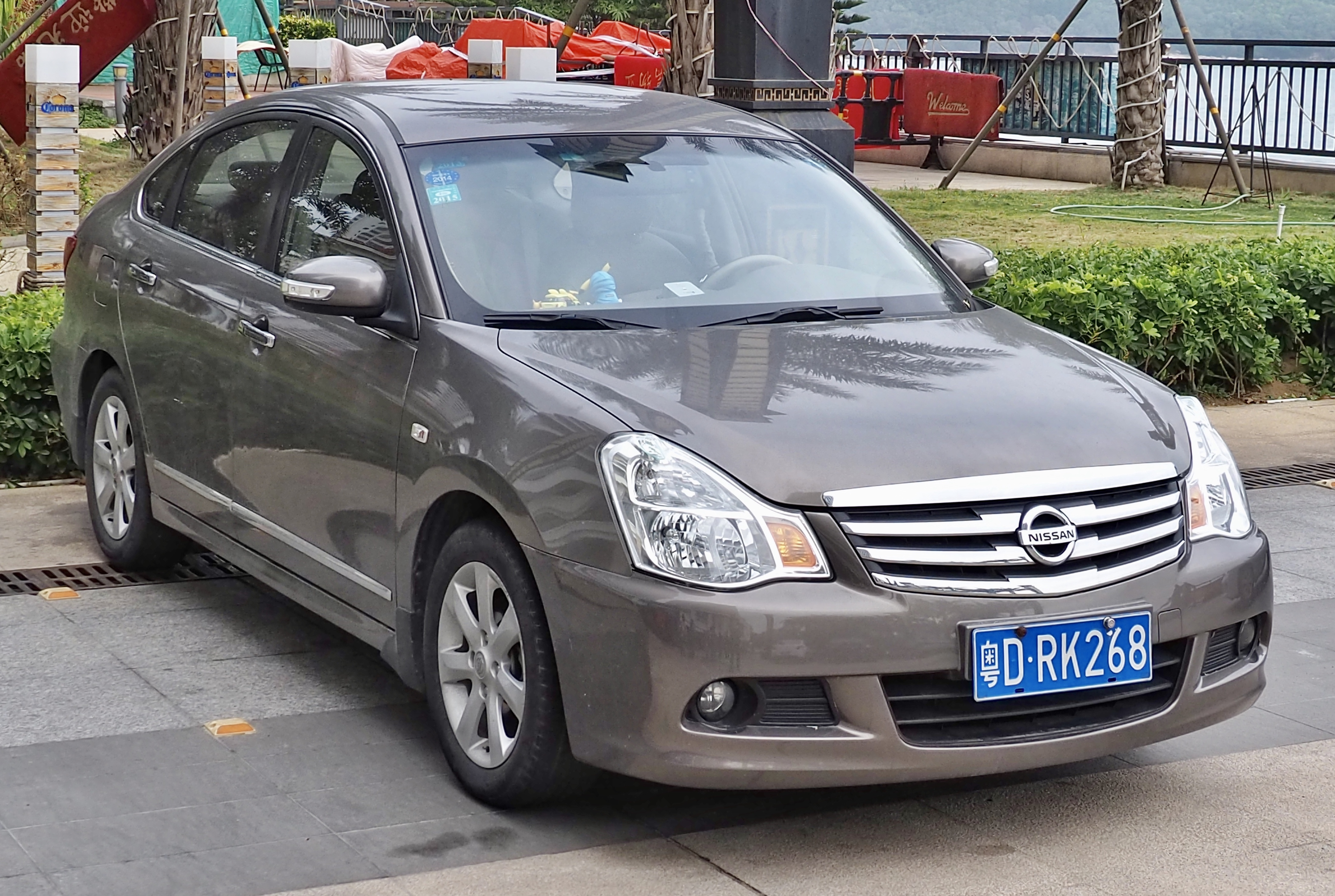
Front (facelift)

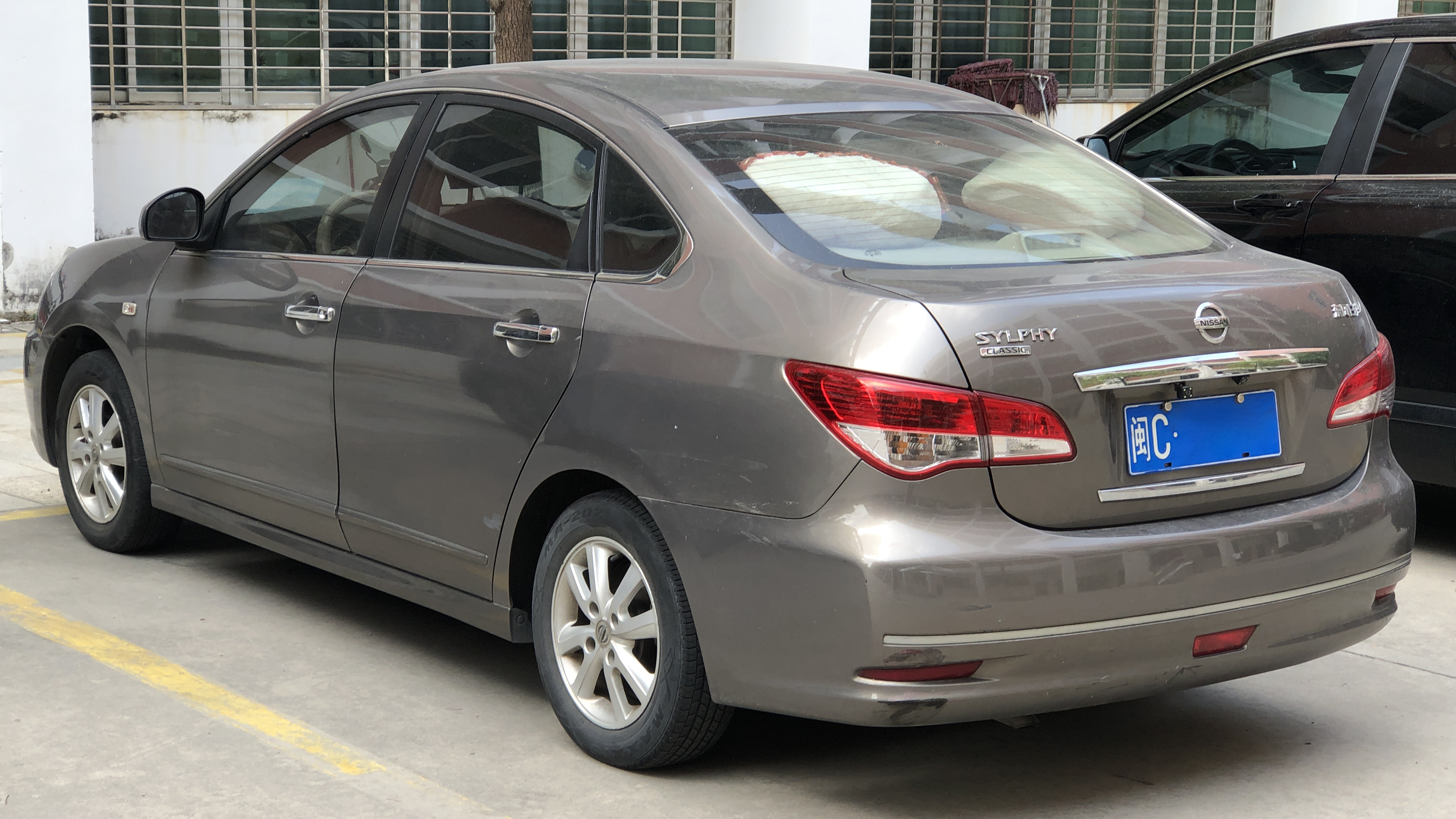
Rear (facelift)

== Third generation (B17; 2012) ==
The third-generation Sylphy was revealed at the 2012 Beijing Auto Show. The model is merged with the seventh-generation Sentra to reduce development costs, with several changes to accommodate the taste of Asian customers.

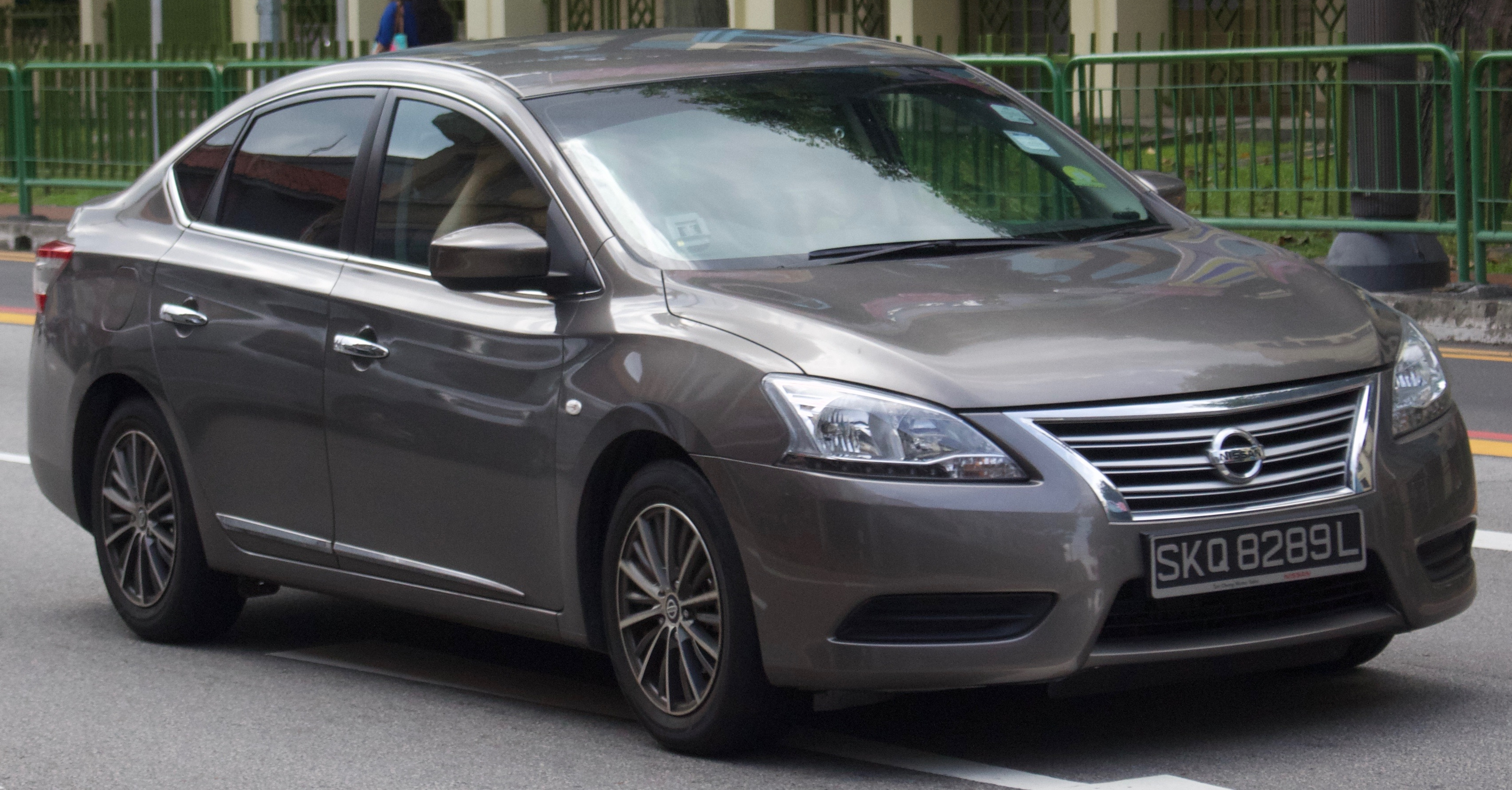
Nissan Sylphy B17 (Singapore; pre-facelift)

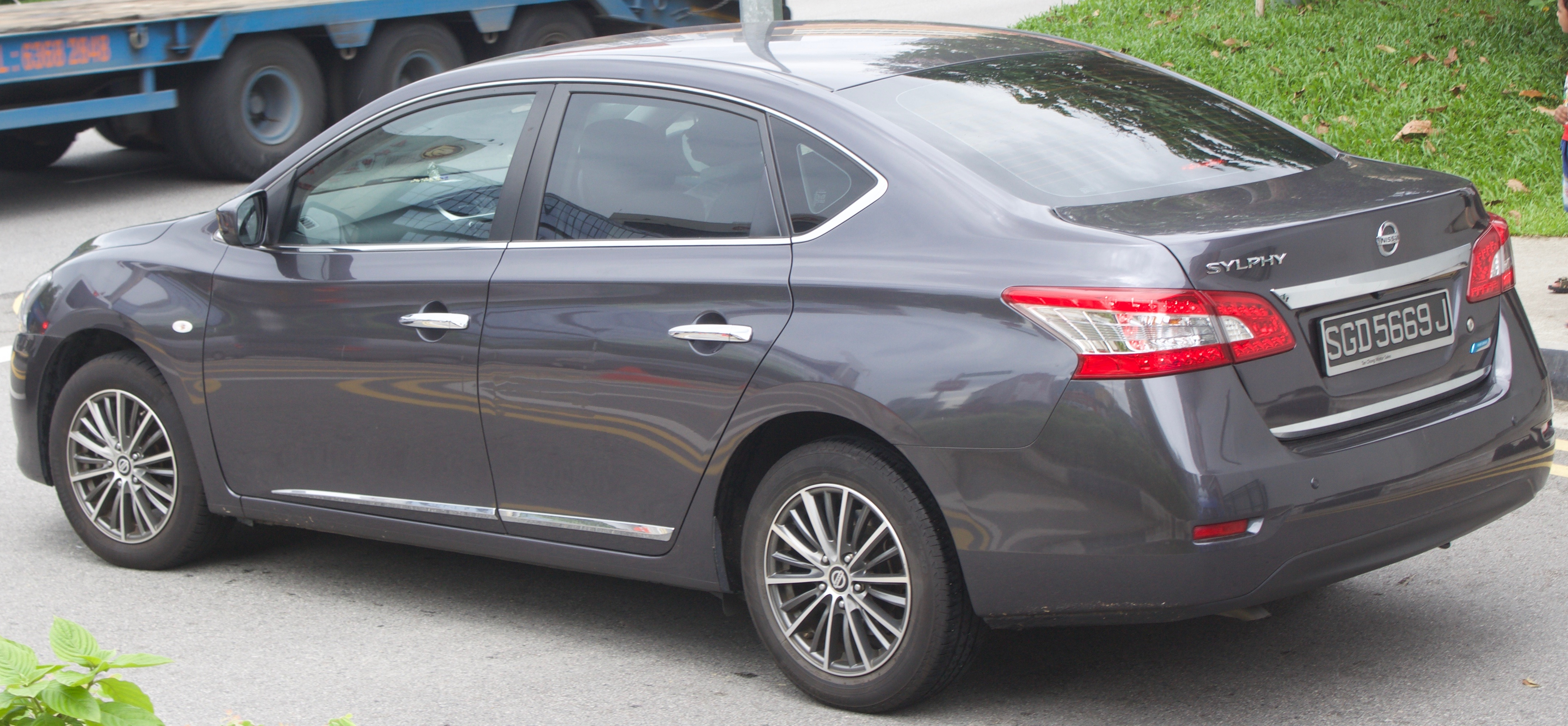
Nissan Sylphy B17 (Singapore; pre-facelift)

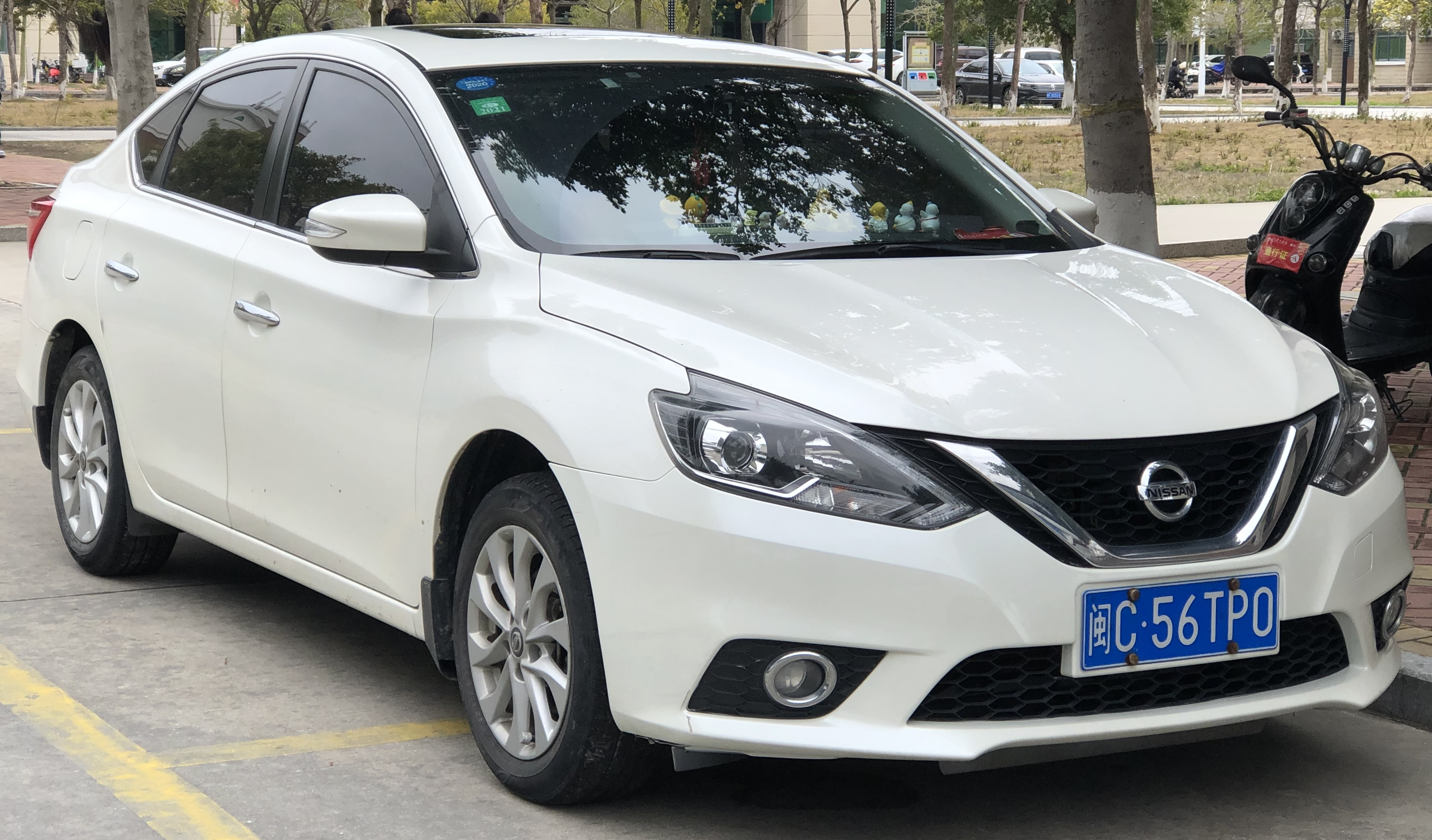
Facelift (China)

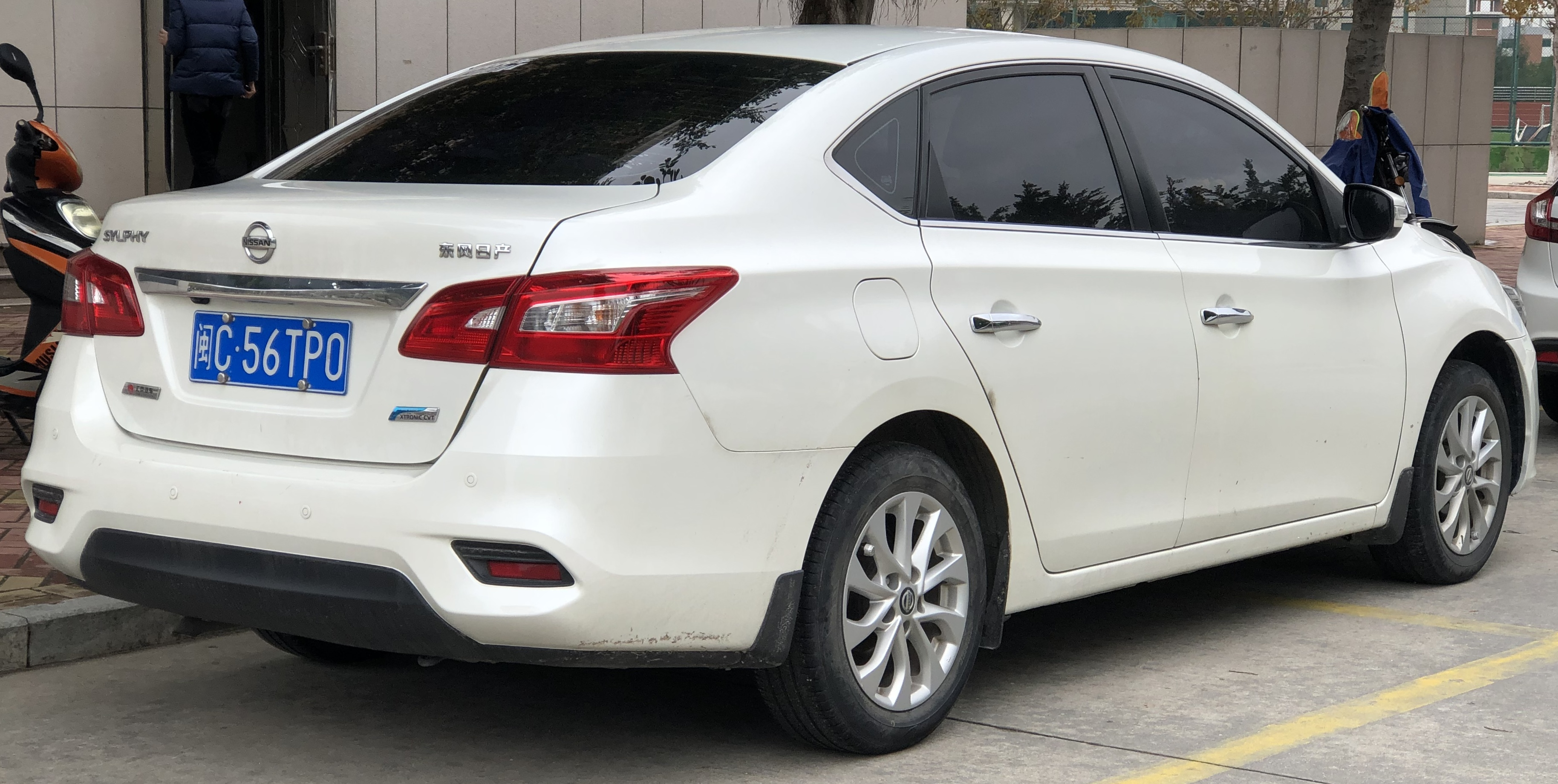
Facelift (China)

== Fourth generation (B18; 2019) ==
The fourth-generation Sylphy was unveiled on 16 April 2019 at the 18th Auto Shanghai. It was revealed prior to its Sentra counterpart which was launched for the North American market later that year at the 2019 Los Angeles Auto Show.

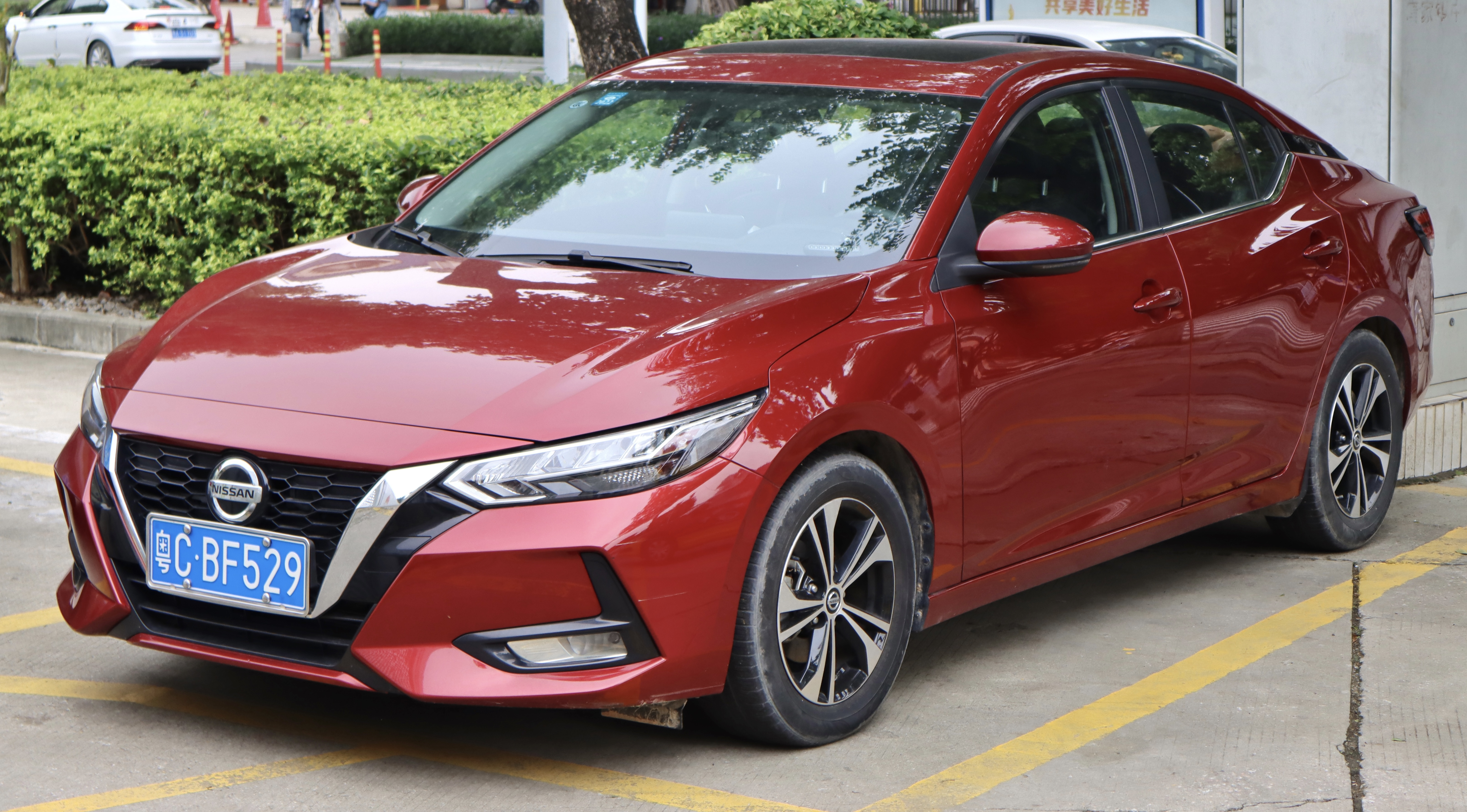
Nissan Sylphy B18 (China)

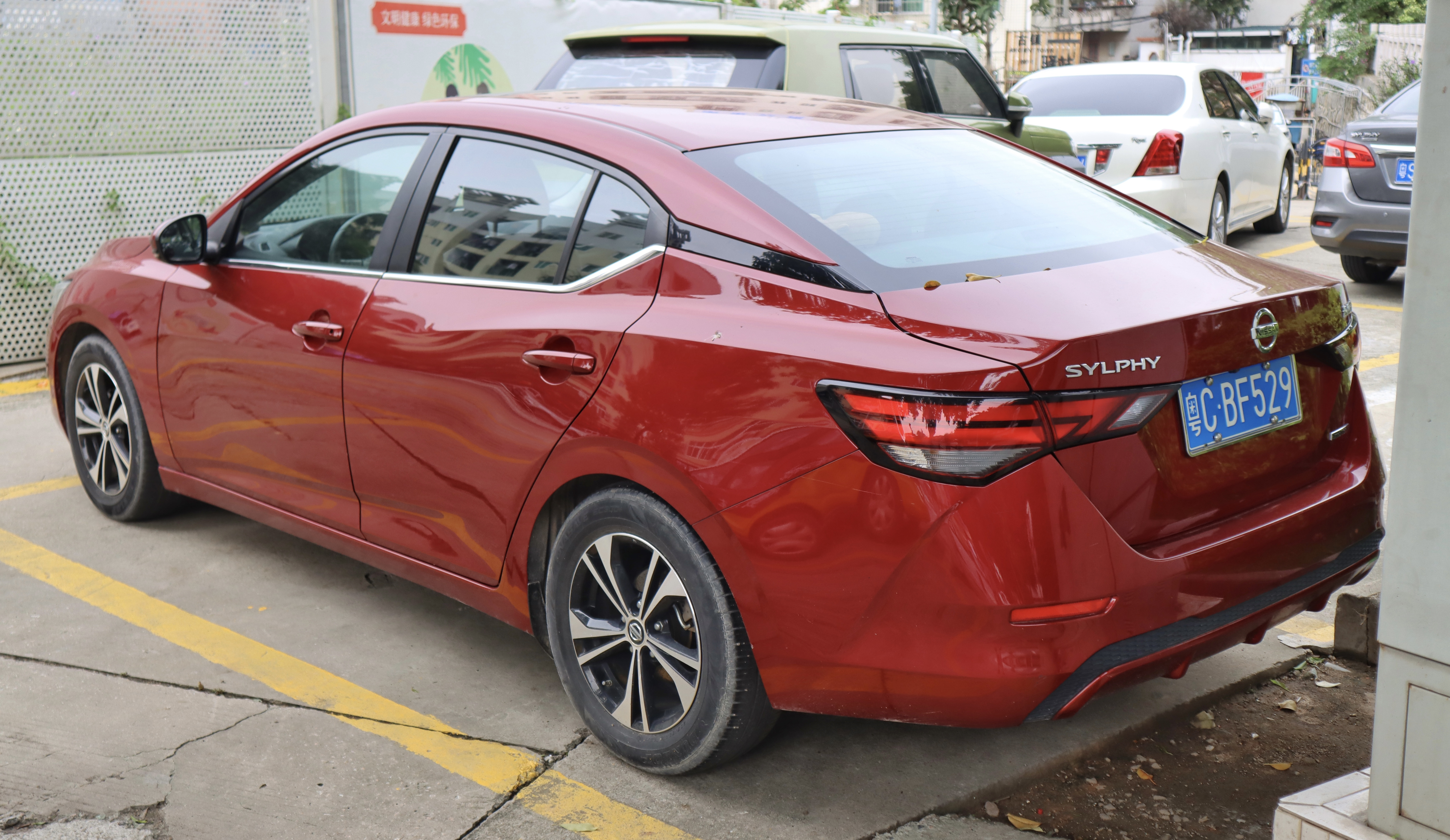
Nissan Sylphy B18 (China)

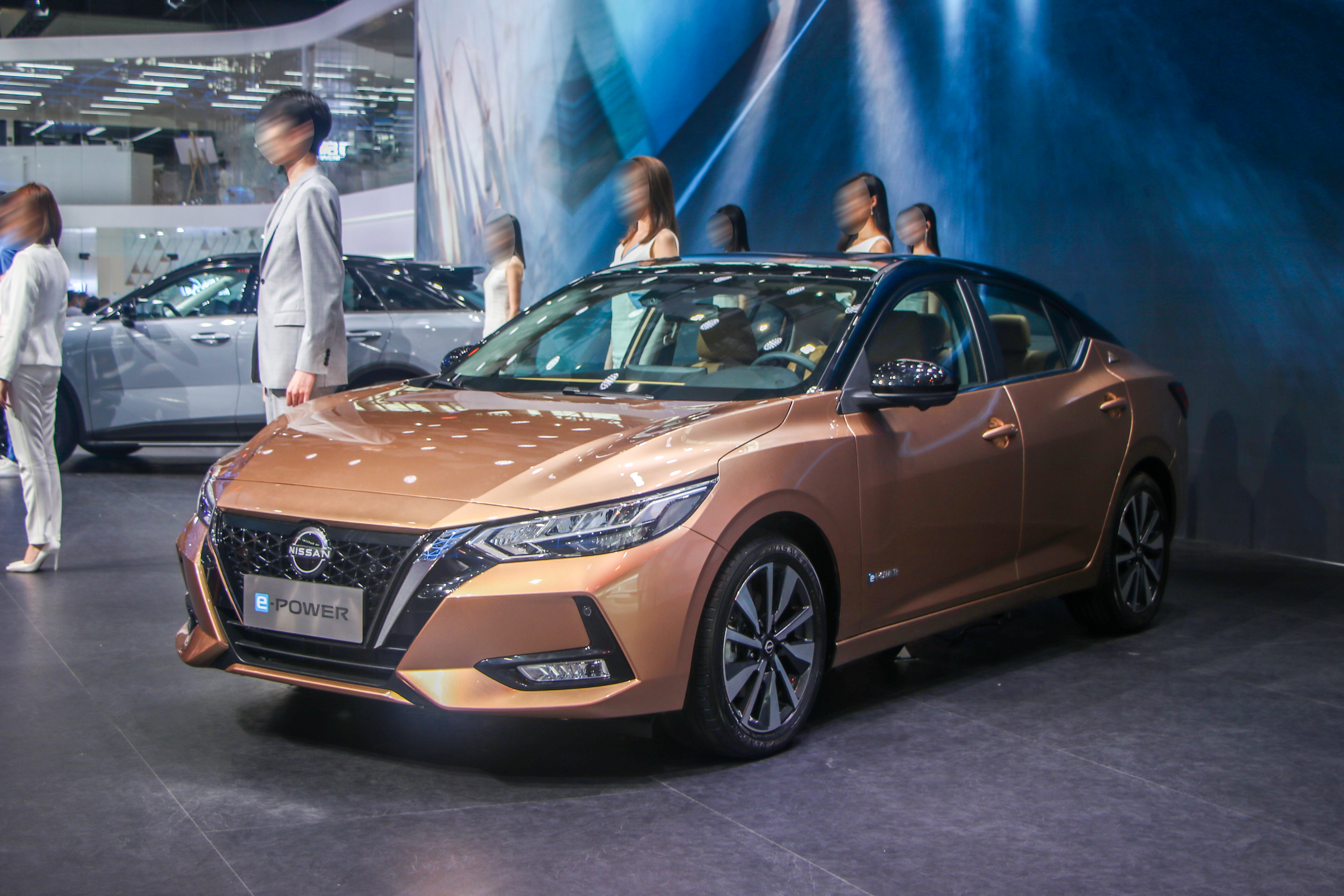
Nissan Sylphy e-Power (China)

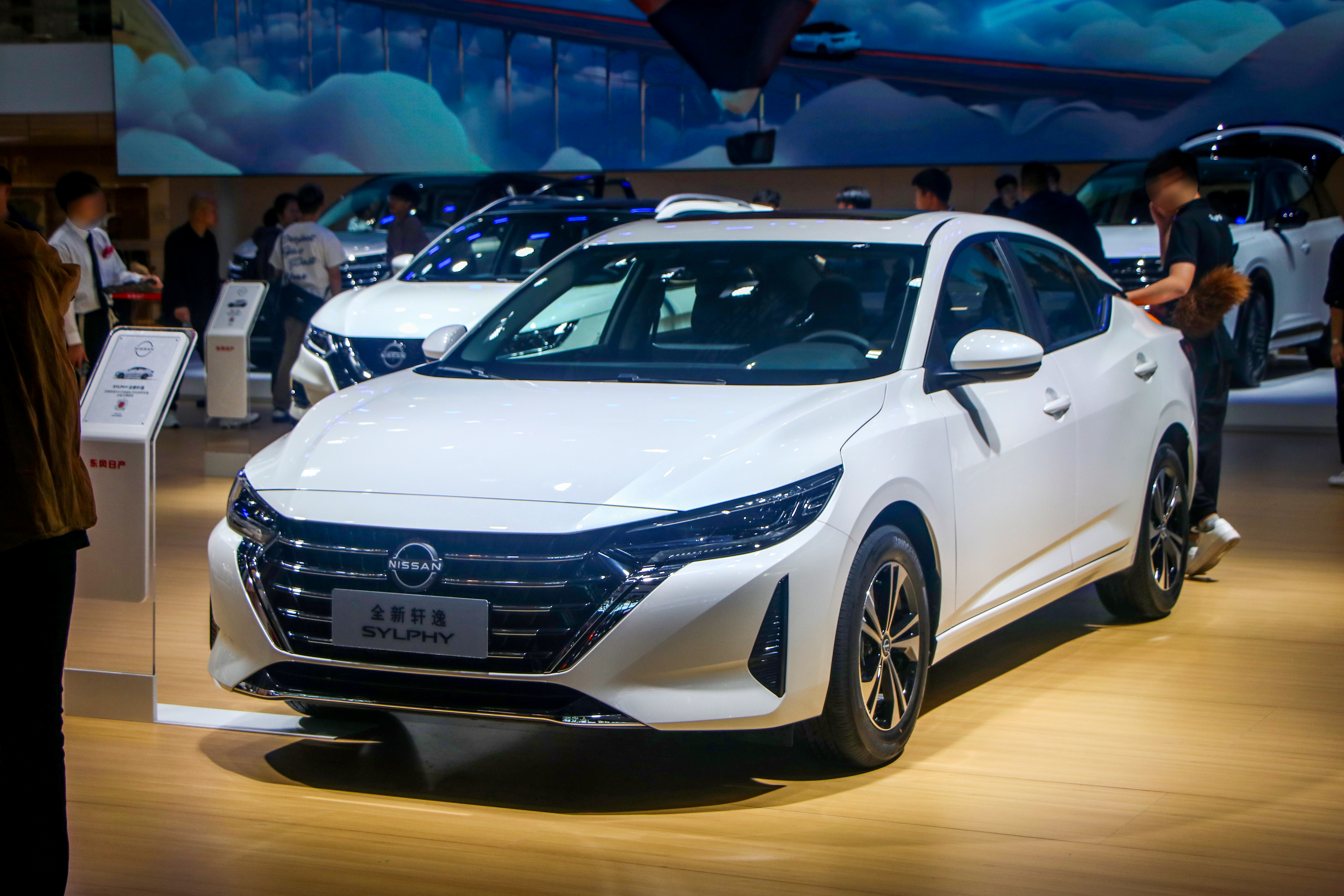
2023 Sylphy (facelift; China)

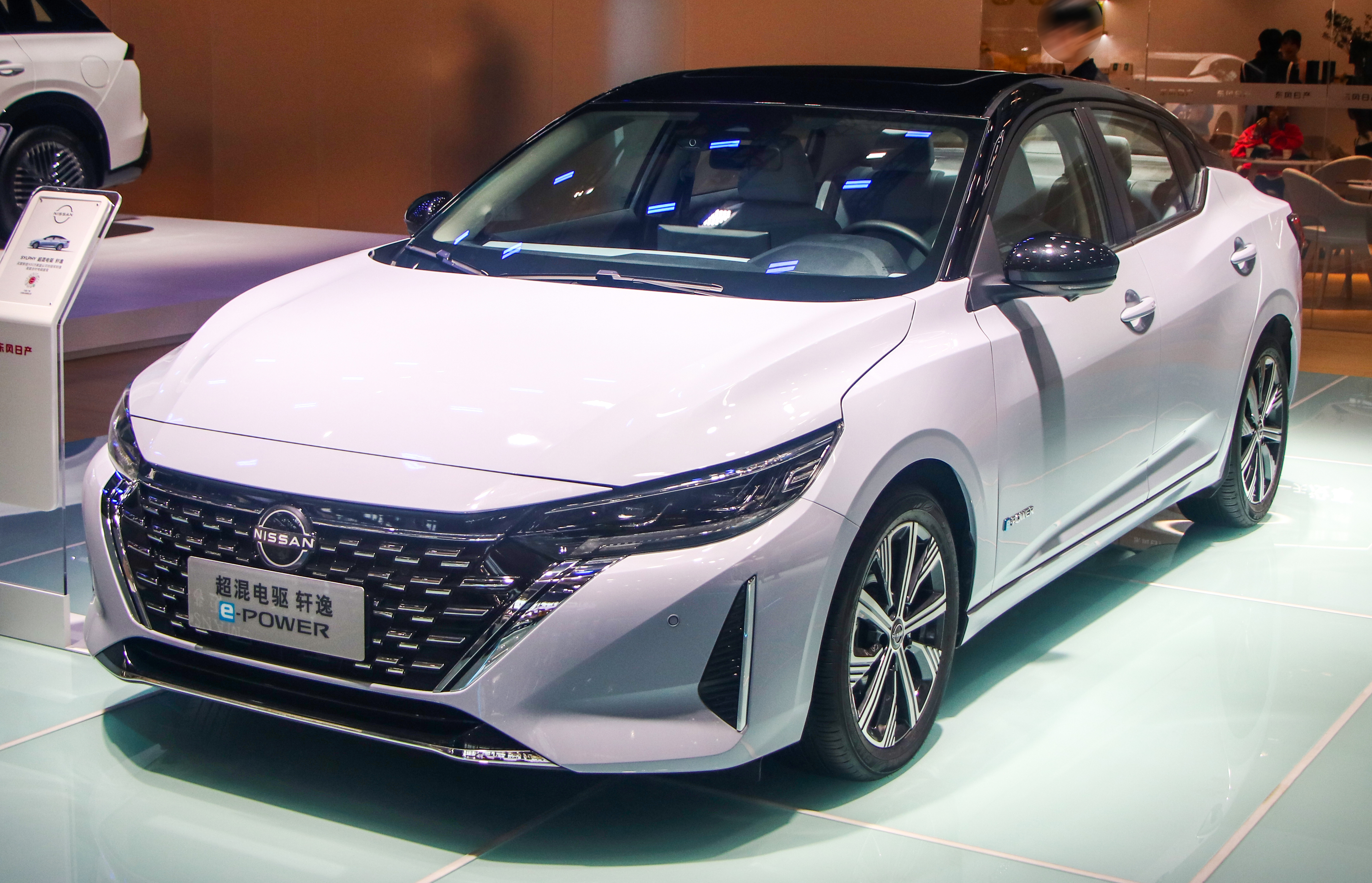
2023 Sylphy e-Power (facelift; China)

== Fifth generation (B19; 2026) ==
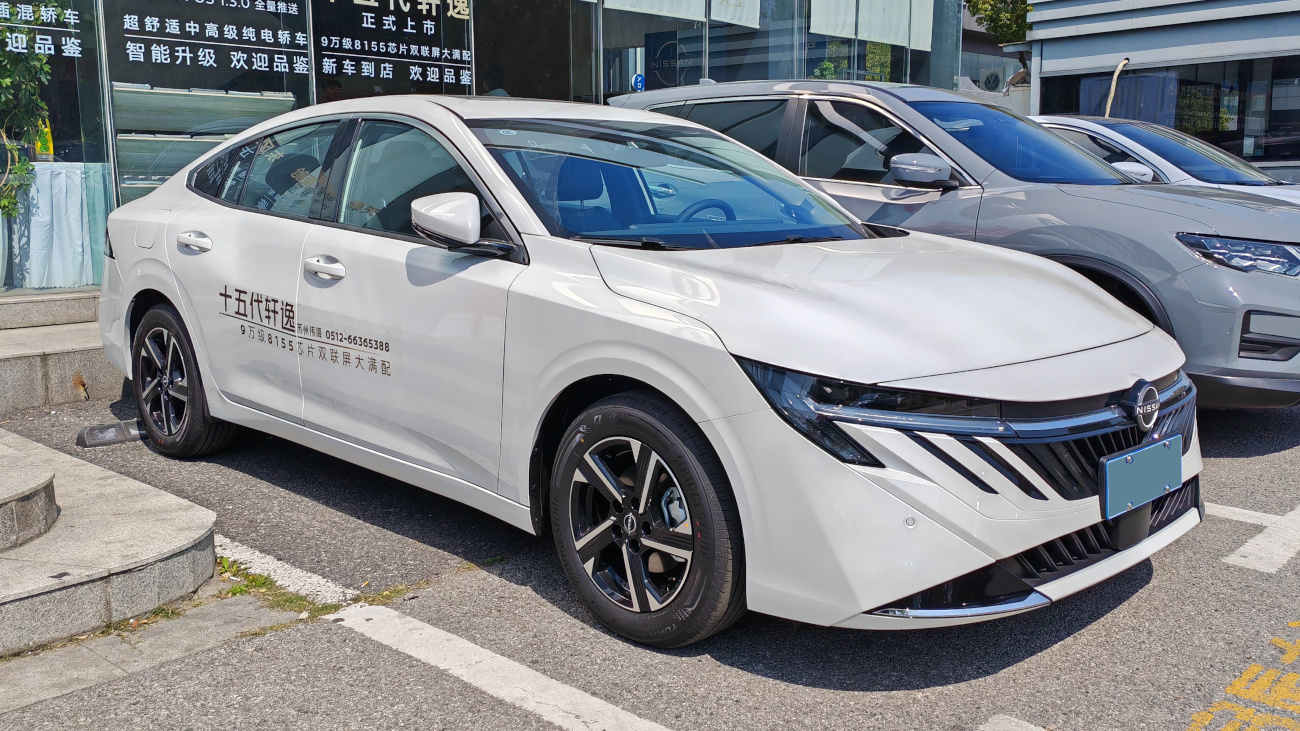
Nissan Sylphy B19

The fifth-generation Sylphy was unveiled on 11 September 2025. and was released in China in February 2026.

== Sales ==
Year	China	Thailand
2006	55,999	
2007	61,386	
2008	52,640	
2009	96,174	
2010	142,511	
2011	125,427	
2012	133,823	
2013	259,545	
2014	300,058	3,645
2015	334,087	2,978
2016	367,979	1,223
2017	404,726	1,155
2018	481,216	1,206
2019	470,707	
2020	542,725	
2021	500,160	
2022	420,665	
2023	376,109	
2024	342,395	
2025	274,012	
