= Nissan QG engine =

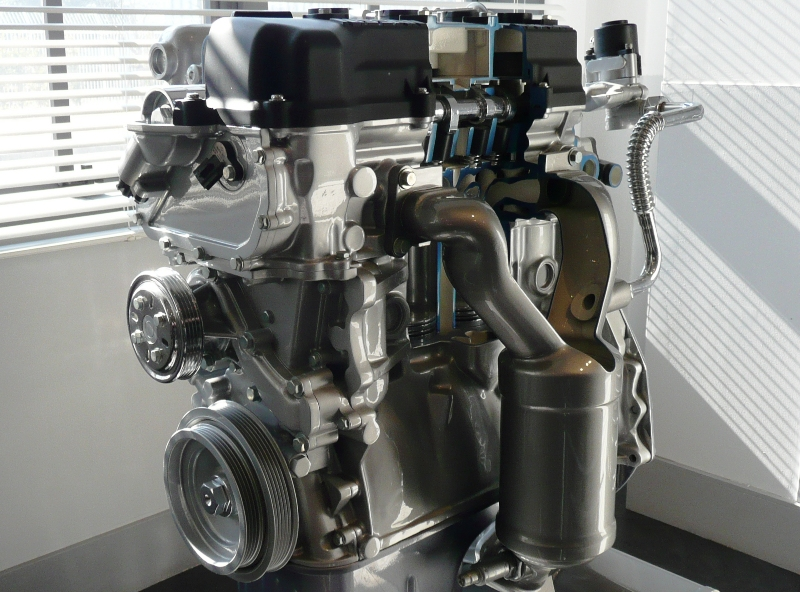
- QG18DE engine at the Nissan Engine Museum

Overview
- Manufacturer: Nissan Machinery (Aichi Kikai)

Layout
- Configuration: Straight-4
- Displacement: 1.3–1.8 L (1,295–1,769 cc)
- Cylinder bore: 71 mm (2.8 in); 73.6 mm (2.90 in); 76 mm (2.99 in); 80 mm (3.15 in)
- Piston stroke: 81.8 mm (3.22 in); 88 mm (3.46 in)
- Cylinder block material: Cast-iron
- Cylinder head material: Aluminum
- Valvetrain: DOHC 4 valves x cyl. with VVT
- Compression ratio: 9.5:1

RPM range
- Max. engine speed: 6500

Combustion
- Fuel system: Electronic fuel injection MPFI (in QG18DE); Direct injection (optional in NEO Di)
- Fuel type: Gasoline; Natural gas (in QG18DEN)
- Cooling system: Water-cooled

Output
- Power output: 87–130 PS (64–96 kW)
- Torque output: 130–174 N⋅m (96–128 lb⋅ft)

Chronology
- Predecessor: Nissan GA engine Nissan SR engine

The QG engine is a 1.3 L (1,295 cc), 1.5 L (1,497 cc), 1.6 L (1,597 cc) and 1.8 L (1,769 cc) straight-4 piston engine from Nissan. It is a lean-burn aluminum DOHC 4-valve design with variable valve timing and optional NEO Di direct injection.

The QG engines were designed by Nissan's Aichi Kikai division in Japan. Nissan websites state the QG as standing for "Quality and Green".

== QG13DE ==
The QG13DE is a 1.3 L (1,295 cc) DOHC 16-valve with 4-cylinder. It produces 87 PS (64 kW; 86 hp) at 6000 rpm and 130 N⋅m (96 lb⋅ft) at 4400 rpm in the initial trim. Bore x Stroke= 71 mm × 81.8 mm (2.80 in × 3.22 in)

It is used in the following vehicles:

- 1999-2006 Nissan AD Van (Y11)
- 1998-2004 Nissan Sunny (B15)
- 2005-2012 Nissan Sentra N16 series for low-end models (Philippines)

== QG15DE ==
Water-cooled straight 4 cylinder engine with 1.5 L (1,497 cc) capacity and DOHC control. Bore and stroke are 73.6 mm × 88 mm (2.90 in × 3.46 in). Output is 90 PS (66 kW; 89 hp) at 5600 rpm and 128 N⋅m (94 lb⋅ft) at 2800 rpm in initial, European specifications, and later 105 PS (77 kW; 104 hp) at 6000 rpm and 143 N⋅m (105 lb⋅ft) at 4400 rpm.

This engine is used in:

- 1999-2004 Nissan Sunny (B15)
- 1999-2008 Nissan Wingroad/AD (Y11)
- 2002-2009 Samsung SM3 (G10)

Power outputs for N16 Almera:

- '00-'02: 90ps
- '02-'06: 98ps

== QG16DE ==
The QG16DE is a 1.6 L (1,597 cc) straight 4-cylinder engine with double over head camshafts with 16 valves. The cylinder head also features Nissan Variable Cam Timing (N-VCT) and micro-polished camshafts. A new water pump assembly has been designed for the QG16DE; the design is based on the water pump from the GA16DE, the changes made it more efficient and reliable than its predecessor. The engine produces 120 PS (88 kW; 118 hp) at 6000 rpm and 165 N⋅m (122 lb⋅ft) at 4000 rpm, although a variety of other power figures are shown for other years and in other installations. Bore and stroke is 76 mm × 88 mm (2.99 in × 3.46 in).

Specifications

- Displacement - 1.6 L (1,597 cc)
- Layout - DOHC inline-four with Nissan Variable Cam Timing
- Valves - 16, 4 for each cylinder
- Power - 120 PS (88 kW) at 6000 rpm
- Torque - 165 N⋅m (122 lb⋅ft) at 4000 rpm
- Redline - 6500 rpm
- Fuel Delivery System - Electronic fuel injection (EFI)
- Ignition system - 4 coils, 1 for each cylinder
- Fuel Compression Ratio - 9.5:1

It is used in the following vehicles:

- Nissan Sunny NEO with 5-speed manual or 4-speed automatic transmission
- Nissan Sunny N16 series sold in Sri Lanka
- Nissan Primera (P11.144) 2000-2002
- Nissan Primera (P12) edition sold in various countries across Europe
- Nissan Sentra N16 series in the Philippines and the N16 series Pulsar sold in Australia and New Zealand
- Renault Scala sold in Mexico and Colombia
- Nissan Almera sold in South Africa

== QG18DD ==
The 1.8 L direct-injection QG18DD produces 130 PS (96 kW; 128 hp) at 6000 rpm and 174 N⋅m (128 lb⋅ft) at 2800 rpm.

It is used in the following vehicles:

- 1999-2004 Nissan Sunny

== QG18DE ==
The 1.8 L (1,769 cc) QG18DE was designed for Nissan by Aichi Machine Industry, Japan. It is manufactured both in Japan and the Mexican city of Aguascalientes. Bore and stroke is 80 mm × 88 mm (3.15 in × 3.46 in). The engine is tuned to achieve most of its torque at low revs at the expense of raw power at high revs, making the engine very responsive in day-to-day driving. It has a cast-iron engine block, aluminum DOHC cylinder head, uses Multi-port fuel injection, forged-steel connecting rods, two single-piece cast camshafts and a cast-aluminum intake manifold. It also features N-VCT (Nissan's Valve Timing Control technology). This engine received the RJC Technology of The Year Award of 2001.

Specifications

- Displacement - 1.8 L (1,769 cc)
- Layout - DOHC Inline-4 (Straight-4) with VVT tech (called NVTC).
- Valves - 16, 4 for each cylinder
- Power - 115–130 PS (85–96 kW; 113–128 hp) at 6000 rpm
- Torque - 122 lb⋅ft (165 N⋅m) to 130 lb⋅ft (176 N⋅m) at 2800 rpm
- Redline - 6500 rpm
- Fuel Delivery System - electronic fuel injection
- Fuel compression ratio - 9.5:1

Emissions Control Devices

- OBDII - On-board Diagnostic System. Nissan Pulsar N16 Models without EuroOBD in Australia do not have OBDII.
- EGR - Exhaust Gas Recirculation
- HO2S - (4) Oxygen Sensors (2 before exhaust catalyst, 2 after) - note a series 2 1.8l has only 2 O2 sensors: 1 pre-catalytic-converter and 1 downstream from it.
- TWC - Three Way Catalyst (2 in exhaust manifold, 1 under car).
- EVAP - Charcoal Evaporative Purge Canister.
- Ignition Timing: 9 degrees BTDC (can be altered +/- 2 degrees using CONSULT-II handheld diagnostic tester, e.g. blaZt).
- Knock Sensor - located on engine block; retards timing if pinging/detonation is detected.
- Heated Throttle Body - heated by engine coolant.

The QG18DE is used in the following vehicles:

- 2000-2006 Nissan Sentra B15 and N16
- 2000-2005 Nissan Pulsar N16
- 1999-2002 Nissan Primera P11.144
- 2002-2007 Nissan Primera P12
- 2000-2006 Nissan Almera N16
- 2000-2006 Nissan Almera Tino
- 1999-2006 Nissan Primera
- 2000-2006 Nissan Expert
- 1998-2006 Nissan Avenir
- 1999-2005 Nissan Wingroad/AD van Y11
- 1999-2005 Nissan Bluebird Sylphy G10
- 1998-2004 Nissan Sunny B15

== QG18DEN ==
The QG18DEN is the natural gas version of the QG18DE. It produces 105 PS (77 kW; 104 hp) at 5600 rpm and 149 N⋅m (110 lb⋅ft) at 2800 rpm. Bore and stroke are 80 mm × 88 mm (3.15 in × 3.46 in). It was used in the Nissan AD Van from 2000 to 2008.

== See also ==
- List of Nissan engines
