= Variable valve lift =

Automotive piston engine technology

Variable valve lift (VVL) is an automotive piston engine technology which varies the height a valve opens in order to improve performance, fuel economy or emissions. There are two main types of VVL: discrete, which employs fixed valve lift amounts, and continuous, which is able to vary the amount of lift. Continuous valve lift systems typically allow for the elimination of the throttle (which is otherwise normally a single valve constricting the entire engine’s intake airway).

When used in conjunction with variable valve timing (VVT), variable valve lift can potentially offer infinite control over the intake and exhaust valve timing.

== History ==
In 1958 Porsche made application for a German patent, also applied for and published as British Patent GB861369 in 1959. The Porsche patent used an oscillating cam to increase the valve lift and duration. The desmodromic cam driven via a push/pull rod from an eccentric shaft or swashplate. It is unknown if any working prototype was ever made.

Fiat was the first auto manufacturer to patent a functional automotive variable valve timing system which included variable lift. Developed by Giovanni Torazza in the late 1960s, the system used hydraulic pressure to vary the fulcrum of the cam followers (US Patent 3,641,988). The hydraulic pressure changed according to engine speed and intake pressure. The typical opening variation was 37%.

In September 1975, General Motors (GM) patented a system intended to vary valve lift. GM was interested in throttling the intake valves in order to reduce emissions. This was done by minimizing the amount of lift at low load to keep the intake velocity higher, thereby atomizing the intake charge. GM encountered problems running at very low lift, and abandoned the project.

== Discrete ==
=== Honda ===
In 1989, Honda released their Variable Valve Timing and Lift Electronic Control (VTEC) system. Which switches to a separate cam profile at high engine speeds to improve peak power. Later versions added VVT as well as three stage valve lift.

=== Nissan ===
Nissan introduced its Nissan Ecology Oriented Variable Valve Lift and Timing on its Nissan VVL engine it featured two-stage valve lift.

=== Toyota ===
Toyota's first VVL system was VVTL-i, a two-stage valve lift system that also incorporates variable valve timing. Like VTEC it has a normal and "wild" profile on the same camshaft. This system was only used on the 2ZZ-GE engine.

=== General Motors ===
General Motors (GM) introduced Intake Valve Lift Control (IVLC) on the third generation Ecotec engine. The system provides two-stage variable valve lift in addition to continuous variable timing. Continuously commanded by engine control unit, the valve rocker arm switches between high-lift and low-lift profiles on the camshaft, actuated by an oil control valve through a two-feed stationary hydraulic lash adjuster, allowing for either 4.0 or 10.5 mm lift.

=== Fiat Chrysler Automobiles ===
Fiat Chrysler Automobiles added two-stage valve lift (VVL) to the 2016 update of its Pentastar engine along with improvements to its variable valve timing (VVT) system.

=== Porsche ===
Porsche introduced VarioCam Plus which added two-stage intake valve lift to its VarioCam system.

=== Subaru ===
Subaru introduced i-Active Valve Lift System (i-AVLS) on the second-generation EJ25 (EJ253) which features two-stage intake lift, however it is only used on one of the two intake valves. second-generation EZ30 uses two stage lift shims, bucket, on all intake valves. For the EZ36D, it was replaced by D-AVCS, dual VVT on the intake/exhaust cams.

=== Mitsubishi ===
Mitsubishi introduced its Mitsubishi Innovative Valve timing and lift Electronic Control (MIVEC) in 1992, it featured two-stage valve lift.

== Continuous ==
=== BMW ===
In 2001, BMW introduced the Valvetronic system. The Valvetronic system can continuously and precisely vary intake valve lift, and in addition, the independent Double VANOS system can concurrently vary the timing for both the intake and exhaust valves. The precise control the system has over the intake valves allows for the intake charge to be controlled entirely by the intake valves, eliminating the need for a throttle valve and greatly reducing pumping loss. The latter alone can boost both power output and fuel economy 10-15%. Furthermore, both systems can also be combined with BMW DIVA (Differentiated Variable Air Intake) system which is the world's first continuously variable length intake manifold. As of 2017 BMW is the only company which can implement all three Variable Valve Timing, Lift and Intake Manifold in continuous adjustment form on production car.

=== Honda ===
Honda's Advanced VTEC, which does not appear in any of its production vehicles as of 2018, allows for continuously VVL versus its previous VTEC systems which had discrete lift settings. Although it was speculated that it would first be used in 2008 Honda Accord, the vehicle instead utilizes the existing i-VTEC system.

=== Mitsubishi ===
In 2005, Mitsubishi introduced continuously variable valve lift under the existing MIVEC name. The system uses an intermediate, oscillating cam to alter the rocker arm fulcrum.

=== Nissan ===
Nissan introduced its Variable Valve Event and Lift (VVEL) in 2007 as the world's second CVVL system. The first application was on the VQ37VHR V6 engine of Skyline Coupe (Infiniti G37). Nissan's system is more compact than BMW’s, involving fewer parts and less energy loss, and is therefore more adaptable to high-performance engines. The VVEL does not use a conventional intake camshaft. Each valve is actuated by a cam which is pivoted on - but not fixed to - the camshaft. While conventional camshafts feature fixed rotating lobes, the cam in VVEL swings up and down; this is why it does not need a symmetric profile. Its movement is driven by the camshaft via a series of components. VVEL varies valve lift by the eccentric control shaft inside the rocker arm. By rotating the eccentric control shaft, the position of rocker arm is shifted, changing the swing angle of cam. The swing angle of cam determines the degree of valve lift.

=== Toyota ===
Toyota introduced its Valvematic technology in 2008. Valvematic employs an intermediate shaft to achieve continuous variable valve lift. The intermediate shaft has an actuating member for each cylinder. Each actuating member is made of two finger followers on either side of a roller bearing member. The followers can rotate in relation to the roller member by means of internal gear threads and an electric motor attached to the end of the intermediate shaft. The gear threads of the roller member and finger followers are in opposing directions. This means when the shaft swivels, the roller member and finger followers will move in opposing directions, moving either apart or closer together. In this way, the axle angle between them can be varied infinitely by the electric motor. The intake valve is actuated by camshaft via the intermediate shaft. Specifically, the camshaft acts on the roller member of intermediate shaft, transferring the movement to both finger followers, then towards the roller rocker arms and ultimately to the intake valves. When the angle of the finger followers is narrow with respect to the roller member, valve lift is low. As the angle increases, so does valve lift. In this way, Valvematic can vary valve lift by adjusting the angle of the finger followers in relation to the roller bearing member.

=== Fiat Chrysler Automobiles ===
Fiat's Multiair technology which allows not only variable valve timing (VVT) and variable valve lift (VVL) but also a variable cam profile.

== See also ==
- Variable valve timing
- Variable displacement
- Camless
- Atkinson cycle
