= Lean-burn =

Burning of fuel with an excess of air in an internal combustion engine

Lean-burn refers to the burning of fuel with an excess of air in an internal combustion engine. In lean-burn engines the air–fuel ratio may be as lean as 65:1 (by mass). The air:fuel ratio needed to stoichiometrically combust gasoline, by contrast, is 14.64:1. The excess of air in a lean-burn engine emits far less hydrocarbons. High air–fuel ratios can also be used to reduce losses caused by other engine power management systems such as throttling losses.

== Principle ==
A lean-burn mode is a way to reduce throttling losses. An engine in a typical vehicle is sized for providing the power desired for acceleration, but must operate well below that point in normal steady-speed operation. Ordinarily, the power is cut by partially closing a throttle. However, the extra work done in pulling air through the throttle reduces efficiency. If the fuel/air ratio is reduced, then lower power can be achieved with the throttle closer to fully open, and the efficiency during normal driving (below the maximum torque capability of the engine) can be higher.

The engines designed for lean-burning can employ higher compression ratios and thus provide better performance, efficient fuel use and low exhaust hydrocarbon emissions than those found in conventional gasoline engines. Ultra lean mixtures with very high air–fuel ratios can only be achieved by direct injection engines.

The main drawback of lean-burning is that a complex catalytic converter system is required to reduce NOx emissions. Lean-burn engines do not work well with modern 3-way catalytic converter—which require a pollutant balance at the exhaust port so they can carry out oxidation and reduction reactions—so most modern engines tend to cruise and coastdown at or near the stoichiometric point.

== Chrysler Electronic Lean-Burn ==
From 1976 through 1989, Chrysler equipped many vehicles with their Electronic Lean-Burn (ELB) system, which consisted of a spark control computer and various sensors and transducers. The computer adjusted spark timing based on manifold vacuum, engine speed, engine temperature, throttle position over time, and incoming air temperature. Engines equipped with ELB used fixed-timing distributors without the traditional vacuum and centrifugal timing advance mechanisms. The ELB computer also directly drove the ignition coil, eliminating the need for a separate ignition module.

ELB was produced in both open-loop and closed-loop variants; the open-loop systems produced exhaust clean enough for many vehicle variants so equipped to pass 1976 and 1977 US Federal emissions regulations, and Canadian emissions regulations through 1980, without a catalytic converter. The closed-loop version of ELB used an oxygen sensor and a feedback carburetor, and was phased into production as emissions regulations grew more stringent starting in 1981, but open-loop ELB was used as late as 1990 in markets with lax emissions regulations, on vehicles such as the Mexican Chrysler Spirit. The spark control and engine parameter sensing and transduction strategies introduced with ELB remained in use through 1995 on Chrysler vehicles equipped with throttle-body fuel injection.

== Heavy-duty gas engines ==
Lean-burn concepts are often used for the design of heavy-duty natural gas, biogas, and liquefied petroleum gas (LPG) fuelled engines. These engines can either be full-time lean-burn, where the engine runs with a weak air–fuel mixture regardless of load and engine speed, or part-time lean-burn (also known as "lean mix" or "mixed lean"), where the engine runs lean only during low load and at high engine speeds, reverting to a stoichiometric air–fuel mixture in other cases.

Heavy-duty lean-burn gas engines admit twice as much air as theoretically needed for complete combustion into the combustion chambers. The extremely weak air–fuel mixtures lead to lower combustion temperatures and therefore lower NOx formation. While lean-burn gas engines offer higher theoretical thermal efficiencies, transient response and performance may be compromised in certain situations. However, advances in fuel control and closed-loop technology by companies like North American Repower have led to production of modern CARB certified lean-burn heavy duty engines for use in commercial vehicle fleets. Lean-burn gas engines are almost always turbocharged, resulting in high power and torque figures not achievable with stoichiometric engines due to high combustion temperatures.

Heavy duty gas engines may employ precombustion chambers in the cylinder head. A lean gas and air mixture is first highly compressed in the main chamber by the piston. A much richer, though much lesser volume gas–air mixture is introduced to the precombustion chamber and ignited by spark plug. The flame front spreads to the lean gas air mixture in the cylinder.

This two stage lean-burn combustion produces low NOx and no particulate emissions. Thermal efficiency is better as higher compression ratios are achieved.

Manufacturers of heavy-duty lean-burn gas engines include MTU, Cummins, Caterpillar, MWM, Jenbacher, MAN Diesel & Turbo, Wärtsilä, Mitsubishi Heavy Industries, Dresser-Rand Guascor, Waukesha Engine, and Rolls-Royce Holdings.

== Honda lean-burn systems ==
One of the newest lean-burn technologies available in automobiles currently in production uses very precise control of fuel injection, a strong air–fuel swirl created in the combustion chamber, a new linear air–fuel sensor (LAF type O_{2} sensor), and a lean-burn nitrogen oxide (NOx) catalyst. Because lean-burn combustion typically increases NOx production, the integration of specialized catalysts is essential to mitigating these emissions and ensuring compliance with stringent environmental regulatory standards.

This stratified-charge approach to lean-burn combustion means that the air–fuel ratio is not equal throughout the cylinder. Instead, precise control over fuel injection and intake flow dynamics allows a greater concentration of fuel closer to the spark plug tip (richer), which is required for successful ignition and flame spread for complete combustion. The remainder of the cylinders' intake charge is progressively leaner with an overall average air:fuel ratio falling into the lean-burn category of up to 22:1.

The older Honda engines that used lean-burn (not all did) accomplished this by having a parallel fuel and intake system that fed a pre-chamber the "ideal" ratio for initial combustion. This burning mixture was then opened to the main chamber where a much larger and leaner mix then ignited to provide sufficient power. During the time this design was in production this system (CVCC, Compound Vortex Controlled Combustion) primarily allowed lower emissions without the need for a catalytic converter. These were carbureted engines and the relative "imprecise" nature of such limited the MPG abilities of the concept that now under MPI (Multi-Port fuel Injection) allows for higher MPG too.

The newer Honda stratified charge (lean-burn engines) operate on air–fuel ratios as high as 22:1. The amount of fuel drawn into the engine is much lower than a typical gasoline engine, which operates at 14.7:1—the chemical stoichiometric ideal for complete combustion when averaging gasoline to the petrochemical industries' accepted standard of C_{8}H_{18}.

This lean-burn ability by the necessity of the limits of physics, and the chemistry of combustion as it applies to a current gasoline engine must be limited to light load and lower RPM conditions. A "top" speed cut-off point is required since leaner gasoline fuel mixtures burn slower and for power to be produced combustion must be "complete" by the time the exhaust valve opens.

=== Applications ===
- 1992–95 Civic VX
- 1996–2005 Civic Hx
- 2002–05 Civic Hybrid
- 2000–06 Insight Manual transmission & Japanese spec Cvt only

Honda lean-burn engine applications
			Unladen weight		Fuel consumption, Japan 10-15 mode				Fuel tank capacity			Range		
Years	Model	Engine	kg	lbs	L/100 km	km/L	mpg UK	mpg US	L	gal UK	gal US	km	mile	Notes
1991–95	Civic ETi	D15B	930	2050	4.8	20.8	59	49	45	9.9	11.9	938	583	5spd manual, 3dr hatch, VTEC-E
1995–2000	Civic VTi	D15B	1010	2226	5.0	20.0	56	47	45	9.9	11.9	900	559	5spd manual, 3dr hatch, 3 stage VTEC
1995–2000	Civic Vi	D15B	1030	2226	5.3	18.9	53	44	45	9.9	11.9	849	528	5spd manual, 5dr sedan, 3 stage VTEC
2000-2006	insight	ECA1	838	1847	3.4	29.4	84	70	40.2	8.8	10.6	1194	742	5spd manual, no AC

== Toyota lean-burn engines ==
In 1984, Toyota released the 4A-ELU engine. This was the first engine in the world to use a lean-burn combustion control system with a lean mixture sensor, called "TTC-L" (Toyota Total Clean-Lean-Burn) by Toyota. Toyota also referred to an earlier lean-burn system as "Turbulence Generating Pot" (TGP). TTC-L was used in Japan on Toyota Carina T150 replacing the TTC-V (Vortex) exhaust gas recirculation approach used earlier, Toyota Corolla E80, and Toyota Sprinter. The lean mixture sensor was provided in the exhaust system to detect air–fuel ratios leaner than the theoretical air–fuel ratio. The fuel injection volume was then accurately controlled by a computer using this detection signal to achieve lean air–fuel ratio feedback. For optimal combustion, the following items were applied: program independent injection that accurately changed the injection volume and timing for individual cylinders, platinum plugs for improving ignition performance with lean mixtures, and high performance igniters.

The lean-burn versions of the 1587cc 4A-FE and 1762cc 7A-FE 4-cylinder engines have 2 inlet and 2 exhaust valves per cylinder. Toyota uses a set of butterflies to restrict flow in every second inlet runner during lean-burn operation. This creates a large amount of swirl in the combustion chamber. Injectors are mounted in the head, rather than conventionally in the intake manifold. Compression ratio 9.5:1. The 1998cc 3S-FSE engine is a direct injection petrol lean-burn engine. Compression ratio 10:1.

=== Applications ===
Toyota lean-burn engine applications
			Unladen weight		Fuel consumption, Japan 10-15 mode				Fuel tank capacity			Range		
Years	Model	Engine	kg	lbs	L/100 km	km/L	mpg UK	mpg US	L	gal UK	gal US	km	mile	Notes
1984–88	Carina T150	4A-ELU	950	2100	5.6	17.0	50	41	60	13.2	15.9	1056	656	5spd manual
1994–96	Carina SG-i SX-i	4A-FE	1040	2292	5.6	17.6	50	41	60	13.2	15.9	1056	656	5spd manual
1994–96	Carina SG-i SX-i	7A-FE	1040	2292	5.6	17.6	50	41	60	13.2	15.9	1056	656	5spd manual
1996–2001	Carina Si	7A-FE	1120	2468	5.5	18.0	51	42	60	13.2	15.9	1080	671	5spd manual
1996–2000	Corona Premio E	7A-FE	1120	2468	5.5	18.0	51	42	60	13.2	15.9	1080	671	5spd manual
1998–2000	Corona Premio G	3S-FSE	1200	2645	5.8	17.2	49	41	60	13.2	15.9	1034	643	Auto
1996–97	Caldina FZ CZ	7A-FE	1140	2513	5.6	17.6	50	41	60	13.2	15.9	1056	656	5spd manual
1997-2000	Avensis T221	7A-FE	1260	2778					60	13.2	15.9			
1997–2002	Caldina E	7A-FE	1200	2645	5.6	17.6	50	41	60	13.2	15.9	1056	656	5spd manual
1997–2002	Spacio	7A-FE												Auto

== Nissan lean-burn engines ==
Nissan QG engines are a lean-burn aluminum DOHC 4-valve design with variable valve timing and optional NEO Di direct injection. The 1497cc QG15DE has a Compression ratio of 9.9:1 and 1769cc QG18DE 9.5:1.

=== Applications ===
Nissan lean-burn engine applications
			Unladen weight		Fuel consumption, Japan 10-15 mode				Fuel tank capacity			Range			
Years	Model	Engine	kg	lbs	L/100 km	km/L	mpg UK	mpg US	L	gal UK	gal US	km	mile	Notes	
1998–2001	Sunny	QG15DE	1060	2865	5.3	18.9	53	44	50	11	13.2	943	586	5spd manual, 4dr sedan	
1998–2001	Bluebird	QG18DE	1180	2600	5.8	17.2	49	41	60	13.2	15.9	1035	643	5spd manual, 4dr sedan	
1998–2001	Primera	QG18DE	1180	2600	5.8	17.2	49	41	60	13.2	15.9	1035	643	556	5spd manual, 5dr wagon

== Mitsubishi Vertical Vortex (MVV) ==
In 1991, Mitsubishi developed and began producing the MVV (Mitsubishi Vertical Vortex) lean-burn system first used in Mitsubishi's 1.5 L 4G15 straight-4 single-overhead-cam 1,468-cc engine. The vertical vortex engine has an idle speed of 600 rpm and a compression ratio of 9.4:1 compared with respective figures of 700 rpm and 9.2:1 for the conventional version. The lean-burn MVV engine can achieve complete combustion with an air–fuel ratio as high as 25:1, this boasts a 10–20% gain in fuel economy (on the Japanese 10-mode urban cycle) in bench tests compared with its conventional MPI powerplant of the same displacement, which means lower CO_{2} emissions.

The heart of the Mitsubishi's MVV system is the linear air–fuel ratio exhaust gas oxygen sensor. Compared with standard oxygen sensors, which essentially are on-off switches set to a single air/fuel ratio, the lean oxygen sensor is more of a measurement device covering the air/fuel ratio range from about 15:1 to 26:1.

To speed up the otherwise slow combustion of lean mixtures, the MVV engine uses two intake valves and one exhaust valve per cylinder. The separate specially shaped (twin intake port design) intake ports are the same size, but only one port receives fuel from an injector. This creates two vertical vortices of identical size, strength, and rotational speed within the combustion chamber during the intake stroke: one vortex of air, the other of an air/fuel mixture. The two vortices also remain independent layers throughout most of the compression stroke.

Near the end of the compression stroke, the layers collapse into uniform minute turbulences, which effectively promote lean-burn characteristics. More importantly, ignition occurs in the initial stages of breakdown of the separate layers while substantial amounts of each layer still exist. Because the spark plug is located closer to the vortex consisting of air/fuel mixture, ignition arises in an area of the pentroof-design combustion chamber where fuel density is higher. The flame then spreads through the combustion chamber via the small turbulences. This provides stable combustion even at normal ignition-energy levels, thereby realizing lean-burn.

Engine control units (ECUs) utilize pre-programmed datasets to maintain optimal air-fuel ratios across the entire spectrum of engine operating conditions, ranging from lean mixtures for cruising efficiency to rich mixtures for peak acceleration. To facilitate this control, modern engine management systems incorporate full-range oxygen sensors. These sensors provide the continuous, precise feedback necessary for the ECU to accurately regulate fuel delivery, ensuring efficient combustion throughout varied performance requirements.

== Diesel engines ==
All diesel engines can be considered to be lean-burning with respect to the total volume, however the fuel and air is not well mixed before the combustion. Most of the combustion occurs in rich zones around small droplets of fuel. Locally rich combustion is a source of particulate matter (PM) emissions.

== See also ==
- Engine knocking
- Hydrogen fuel enhancement

== Footnotes ==
=== References ===
- "Advanced Technology Vehicle Modeling in PERE, EPA, Office of Transportation and Air Quality"
