= N-VCT =

Automobile variable valve timing technology

Nissan Variable Timing control or Nissan Valve Timing Control System (commonly known as N-VTC, VTC, NVCS or NVTCS) is an automobile variable valve timing technology developed by Nissan. N-VCT was first introduced in 1987 on the VG30DE and VG20DET engine.

N-VCT varies valve timing by rotating the affected camshaft relative to the sprocket; valve lift and duration are not altered. This rotation is achieved when an electric solenoid, controlled by the car's ECU, allows pressurized engine oil to flow into and through the cam and into a slave mechanism, axially advancing camshaft timing relative to the sprocket. Valve to crank angle timing varies depending on whether engine speed is high or low and changes at fixed intervals. NVTCS is hydraulically actuated similar to Honda's VTEC system, but adjusts a different aspect of the valve train, so it is more like the I part of I-VTEC. NVTCS equipped Nissan engines do not have as high of engine speeds as VTEC equipped engines so NVTCS is simpler, quieter, and requires no special maintenance. Some Nissan engines only have N-VTC on the intake cam such as the GA16DE, QG16/18, SR20DE/DET (S14-15) or RB25DE/DET (R33-R34 GTS/GTS-T, GT/GTT) while others have it on both the intake and exhaust cams. NVTCS was eventually phased out and replaced by a continuously variable system called CVTCS on newer engines such as the VQ and VK series.

== List of engines ==
- GA16DE
- QG16DE
- QG18DE
- RB25DET (1993+) (intake only)
- SR20DE
- SR20DET
- TB48DE
- VE30DE
- VG20DET
- VG30DE
- VG30DET
- VG30DETT
- VH45DE

== See also ==
- Nissan Continuous Variable Valve Timing Control
- Nissan Variable Valve Event and Lift
- Nissan Variable Valve Lift and Timing
