= Renault Samsung SM3 =

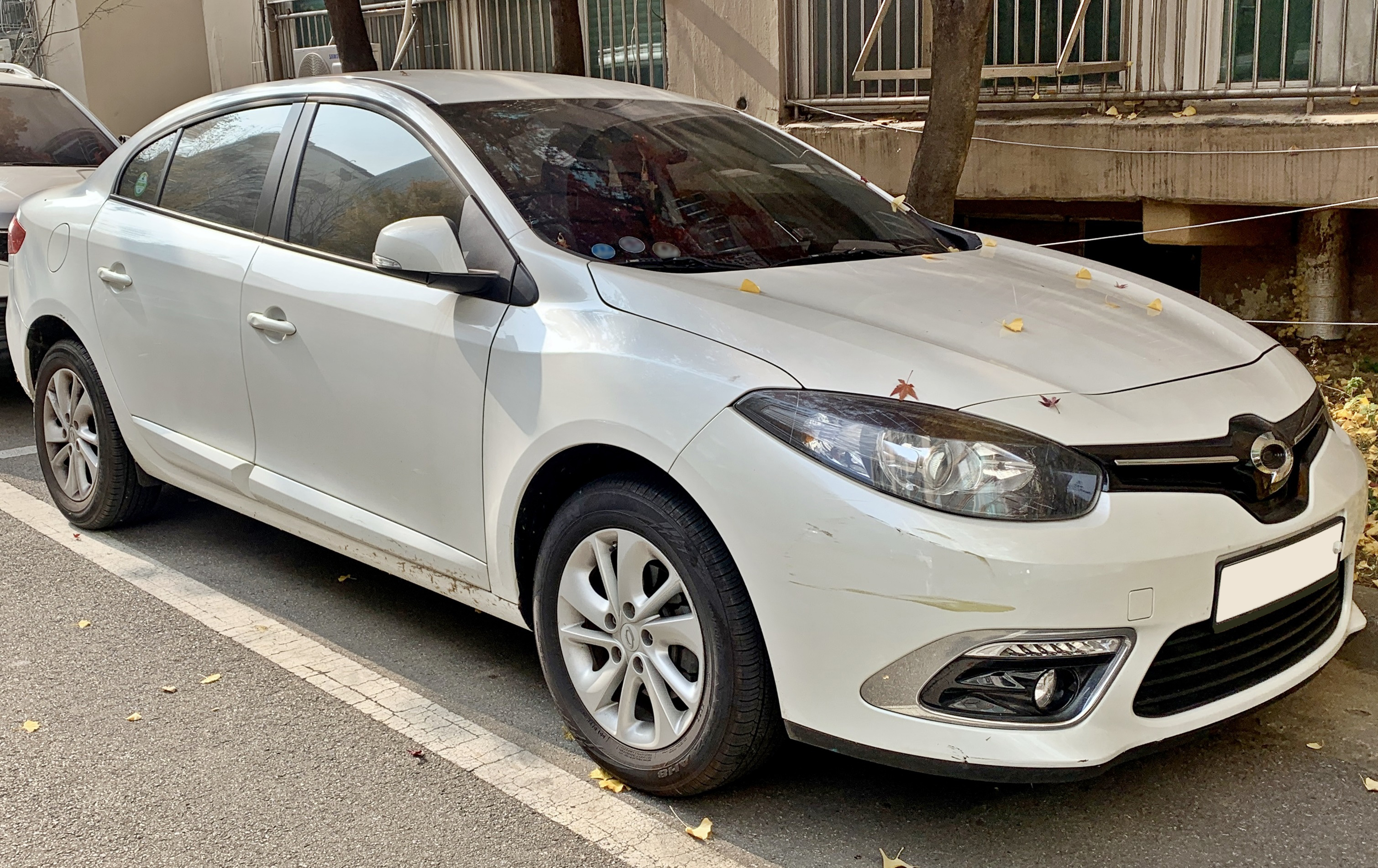

Overview
- Manufacturer: Renault Samsung Motors
- Production: 2002–2020
- Assembly: South Korea: Busan

Body and chassis
- Class: Compact car
- Layout: Front-engine, front-wheel-drive

The Renault Samsung SM3 is a compact car produced by the South Korean manufacturer Renault Samsung Motors from 2003 to 2020.

== First generation (G10; 2002–2009) ==
First generation (G10)
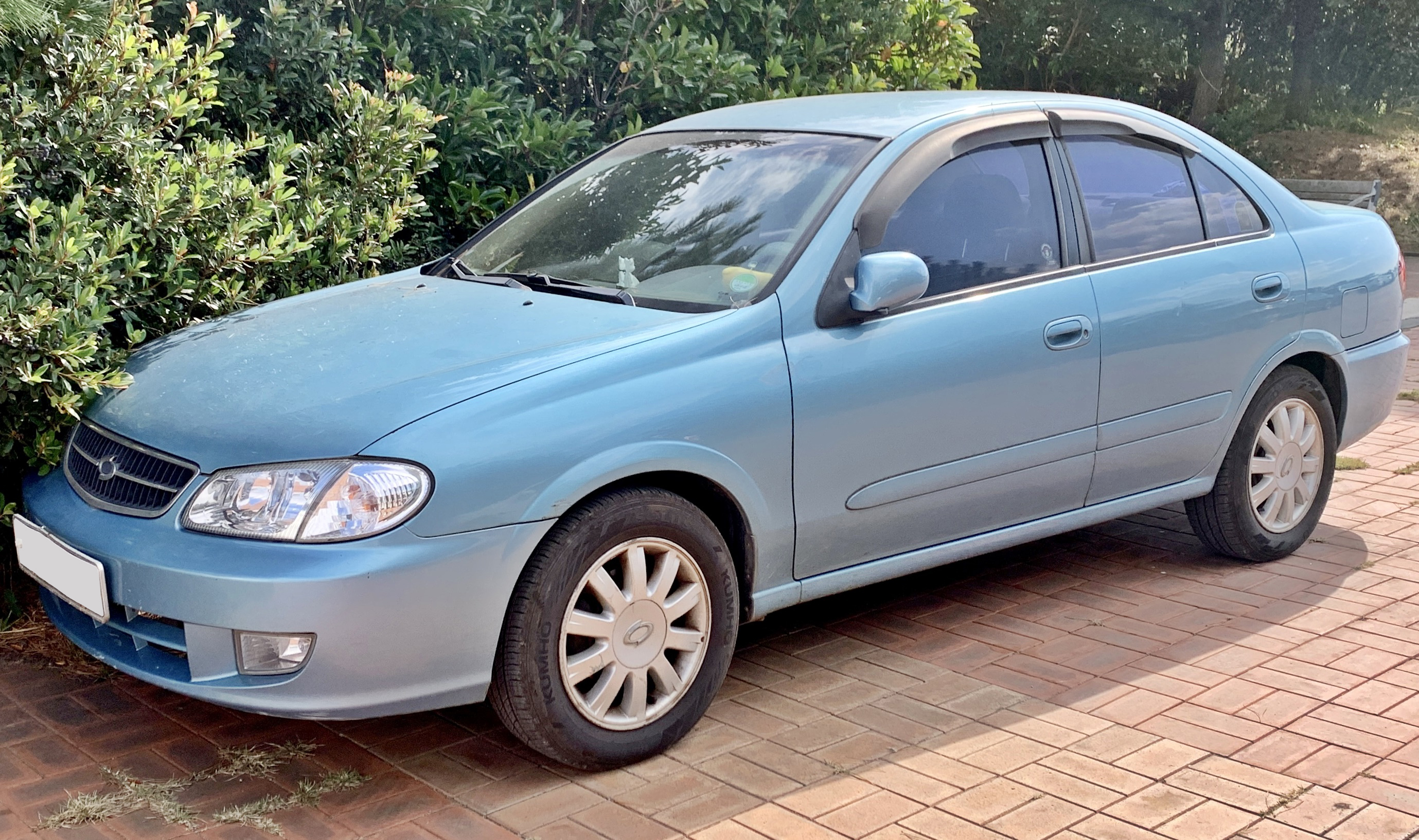

Overview
- Also called: Almera Classic; Nissan Bluebird; Nissan Sunny; Renault Scala
- Production: 2002–2009

Body and chassis
- Body style: 4-door saloon
- Related: Nissan Bluebird Sylphy

Powertrain
- Engine: 1.5 L QG15 I4; 1.6 L QG16 I4
- Transmission: 4-speed automatic 5-speed manual

Dimensions
- Wheelbase: 2,535 mm (99.8 in)
- Length: 4,510 mm (177.6 in)
- Width: 2002–2005: 1,705 mm (67.1 in); 2005–2013: 1,710 mm (67.3 in)
- Height: 1,440 mm (56.7 in); 1,450 mm (57.1 in)
- Curb weight: 1,160–1,185 kg (2,557–2,612 lb)

The first generation SM3 was a rebranded first generation Nissan Sunny/Bluebird Sylphy made in South Korea by Renault Samsung Motors. Production began in September 2002 in Busan. It received a facelift in August 2005 (known as "SM3 New Generation").

It has four versions and two four-cylinder engines available: the original 1.5–litre QG15DE and the 1.6–litre with CVTC system QG16DE petrol, both from Nissan. The 1.6 was added in July 2004 as South Korean automobile taxation was changed; hitherto, there had been a prohibitive tax threshold at 1.5 liters.

In 2006, the SM3 was launched as Nissan Almera Classic in Ukraine and Russia. The same year, the car was launched in Central and South America as Nissan Almera, (Except in Chile where it was sold as Samsung), replacing Sentra after this became a large family car.

The SM3 was also sold as the Nissan Sunny in the Middle East and as the Renault Scala in Mexico, Egypt and Colombia.

In July 2009, it was renamed as SM3 CE (Classic Edition), with no changes to the exterior. The company announced production of the first generation SM3 would be continued while demand existed. The lineup was made smaller and only the 1.6-liter engine remained available in the CE model. The SM3 CE was discontinued in 2011 in Korea and was manufactured in Busan for the Russian, and Peru market, under the Nissan brand. Production ended in 2013.

=== Gallery ===
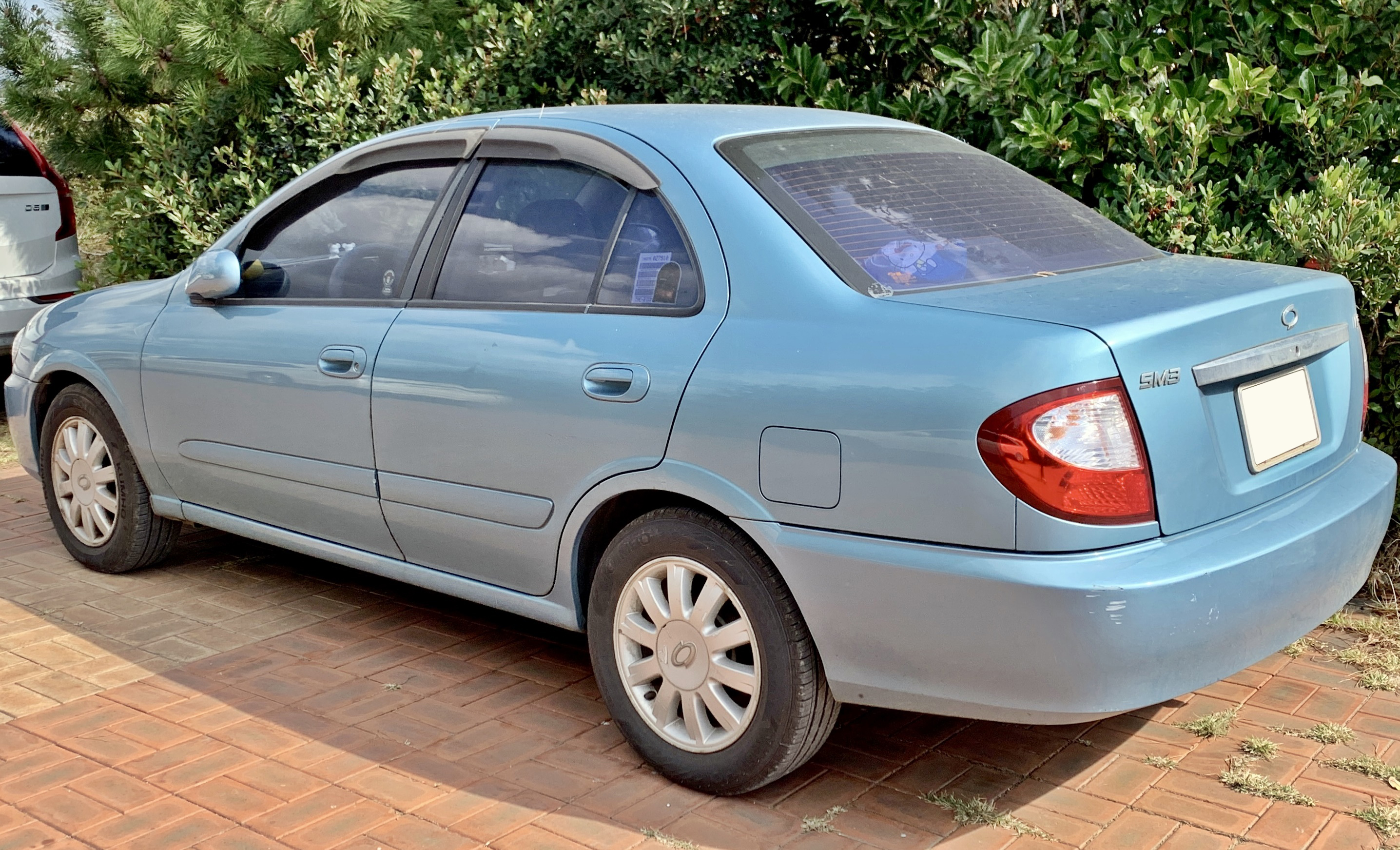
2002 model rear view

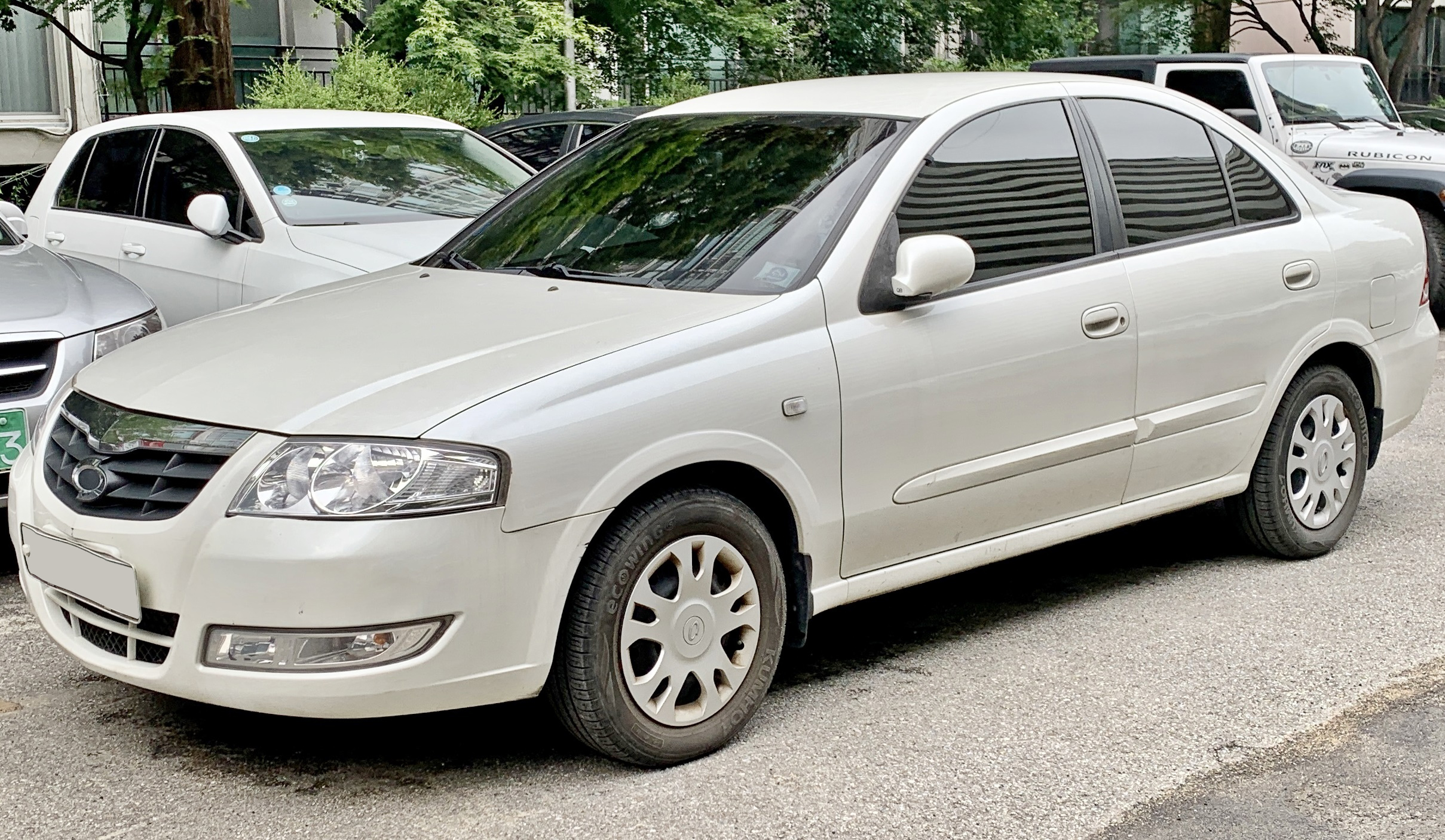
2005 model front view

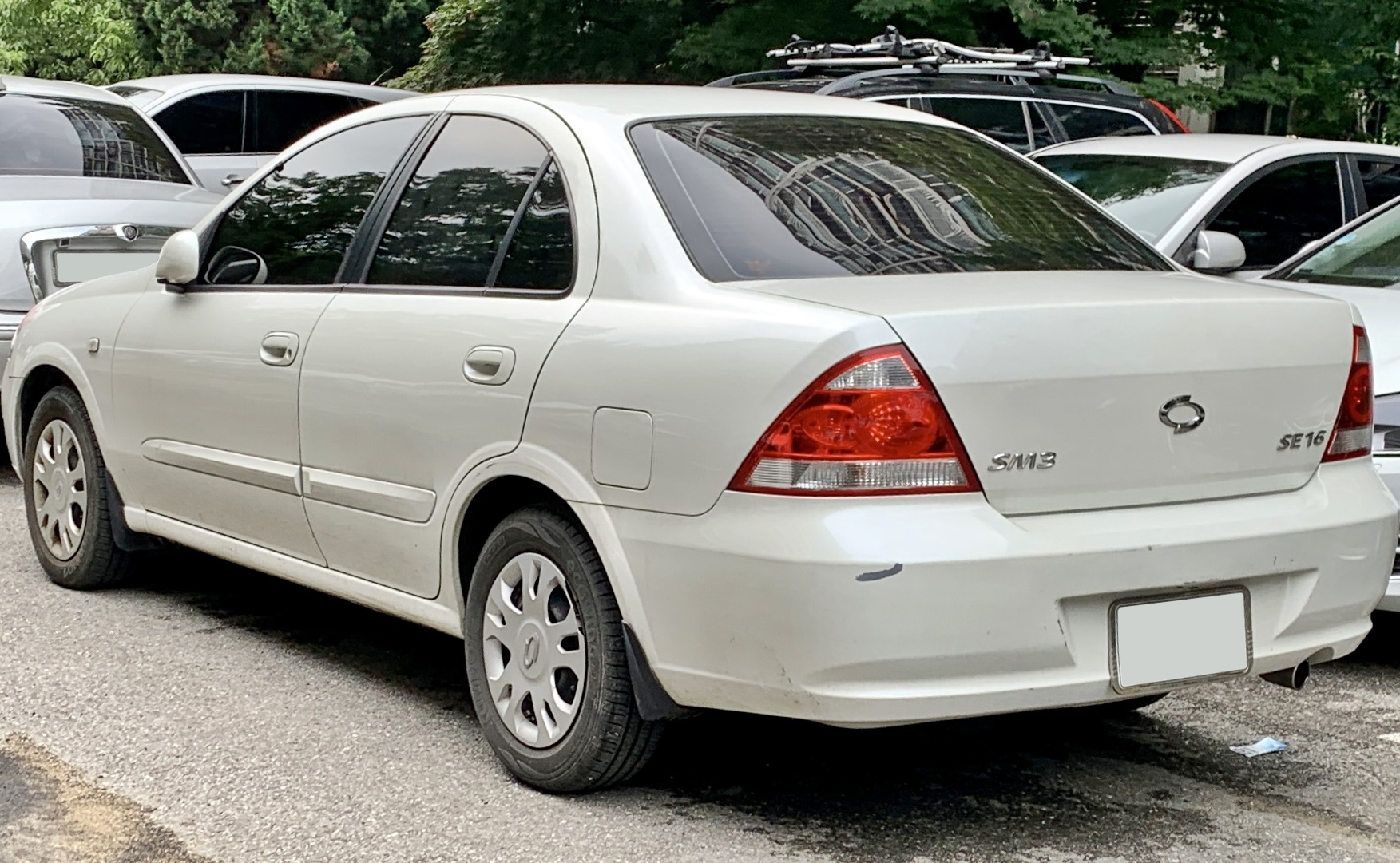
2005 model rear view

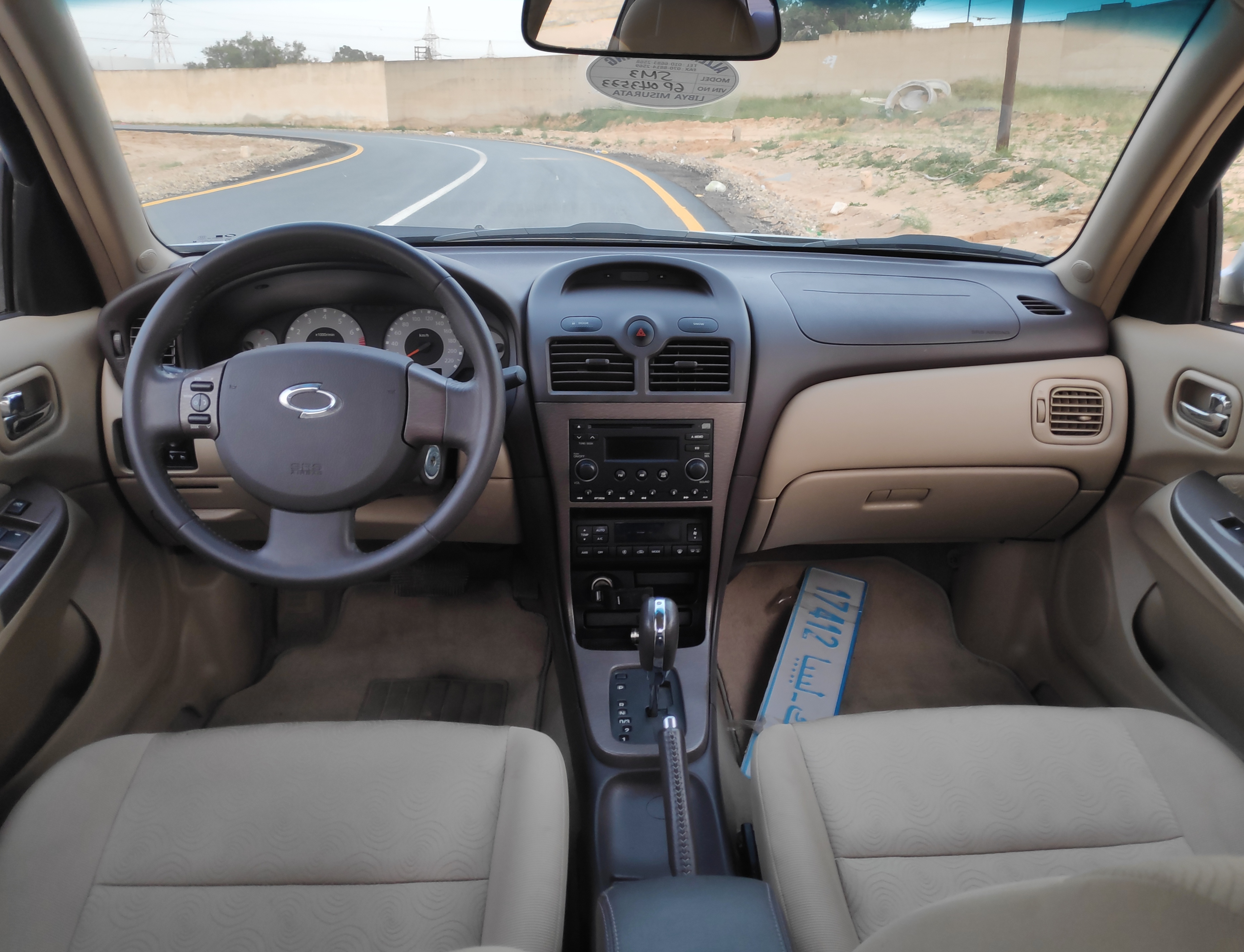
interior

== Second generation (L38; 2009–2020) ==
Second generation (L38)
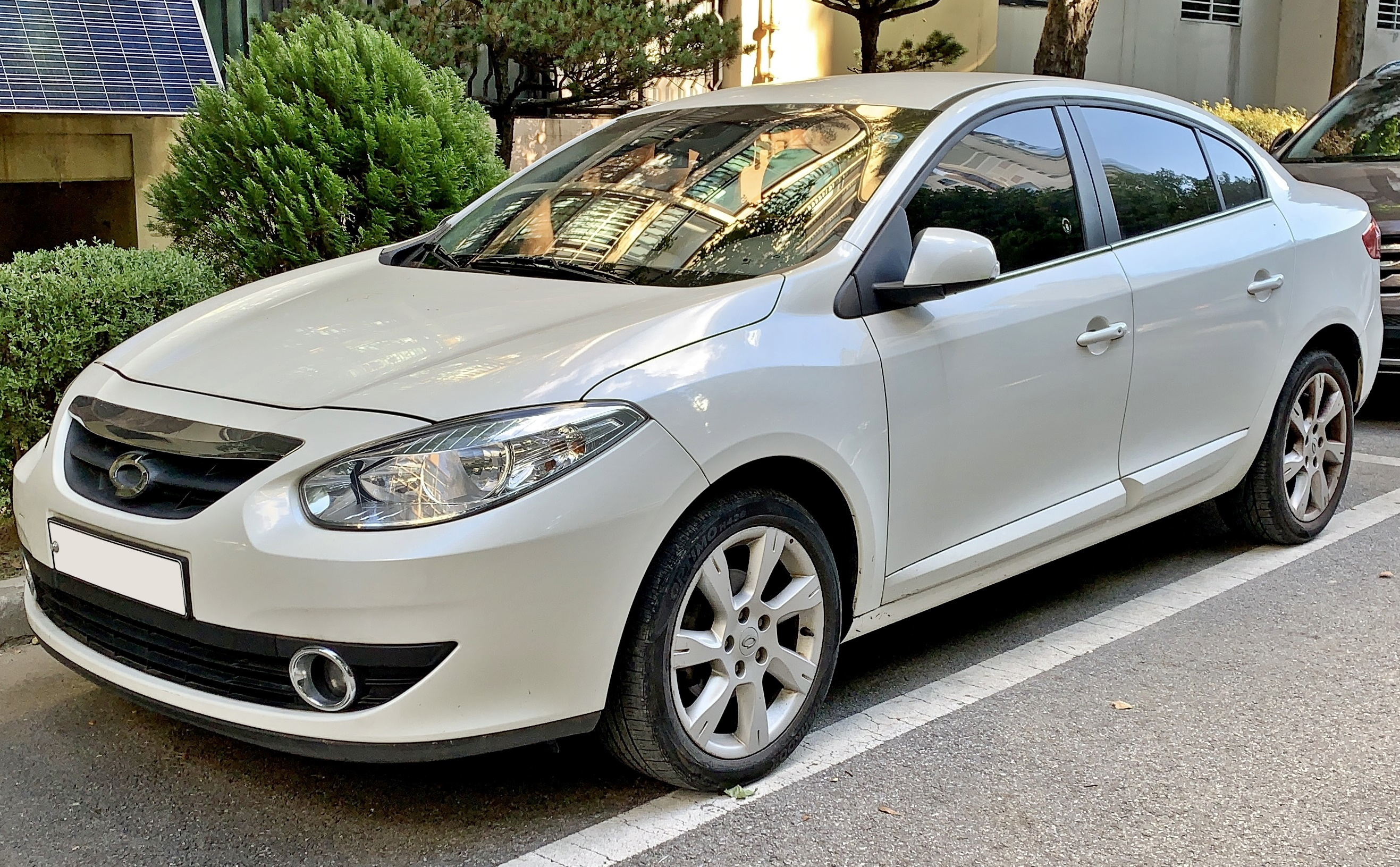

Overview
- Also called: Renault Fluence
- Production: 2009–2020 (ICE version ended production at the end of 2019)

Body and chassis
- Body style: 4-door saloon
- Platform: Renault/Nissan C platform
- Related: Renault Mégane III

Powertrain
- Engine: 1.6 L H4M I4 (petrol); 2.0 L M4R I4 (petrol)
- Transmission: 5-speed manual XTronic CVT automatic

Dimensions
- Wheelbase: 2,700 mm (106.3 in)
- Length: 4,620 mm (181.9 in)
- Width: 1,810 mm (71.3 in)
- Height: 1,480 mm (58.3 in)
- Curb weight: 1,580–1,595 kg (3,483–3,516 lb) 2,130–2,145 kg (4,696–4,729 lb)

In April 2009, a redesigned SM3 was unveiled at the Seoul Motor Show.

The second-generation SM3 is essentially a notchback saloon version of the Mégane 3 with minor cosmetic changes, also badged as Renault Fluence.

In 2019, Renault Samsung ceased production of the internal combustion engined SM3.

=== 2012 facelift ===
In October 2012, Renault Samsung Motors introduced a redesigned front end for the 2013 model year of the SM3, with a new grille, headlamps and bumper as well as an improved equipment.

=== SM3 Neo ===
To create a "family feeling" with a new model of the company, the QM3 imported from Europe, Renault Samsung Motors introduced a new facelift to the SM3's front-end for the 2015 model year, known as the SM3 Neo.

=== Gallery ===
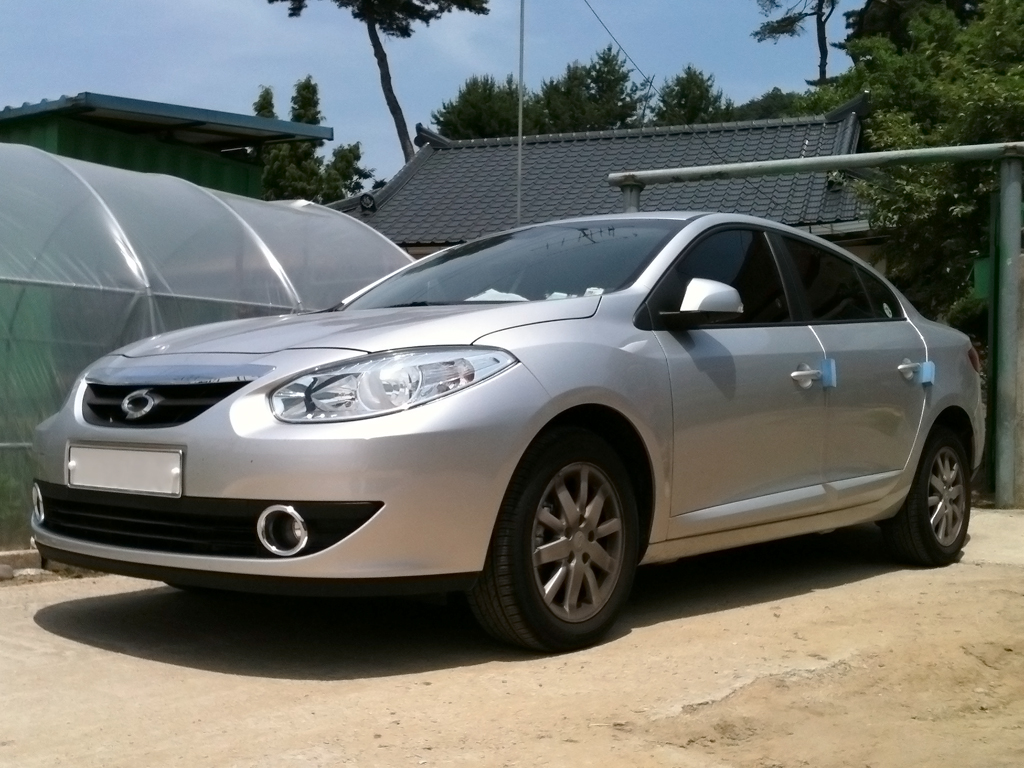
Front side

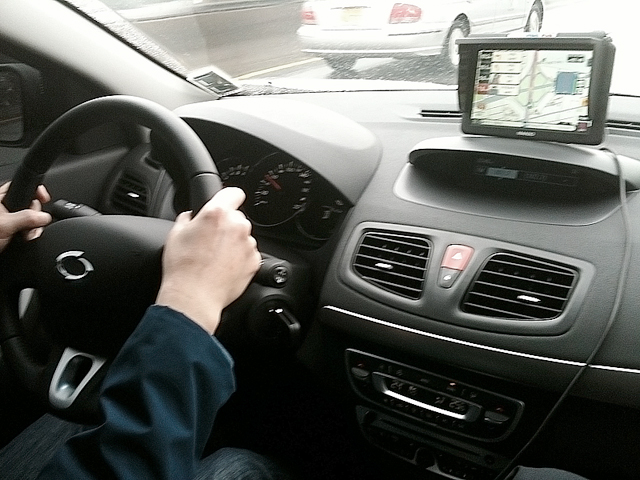
Cockpit

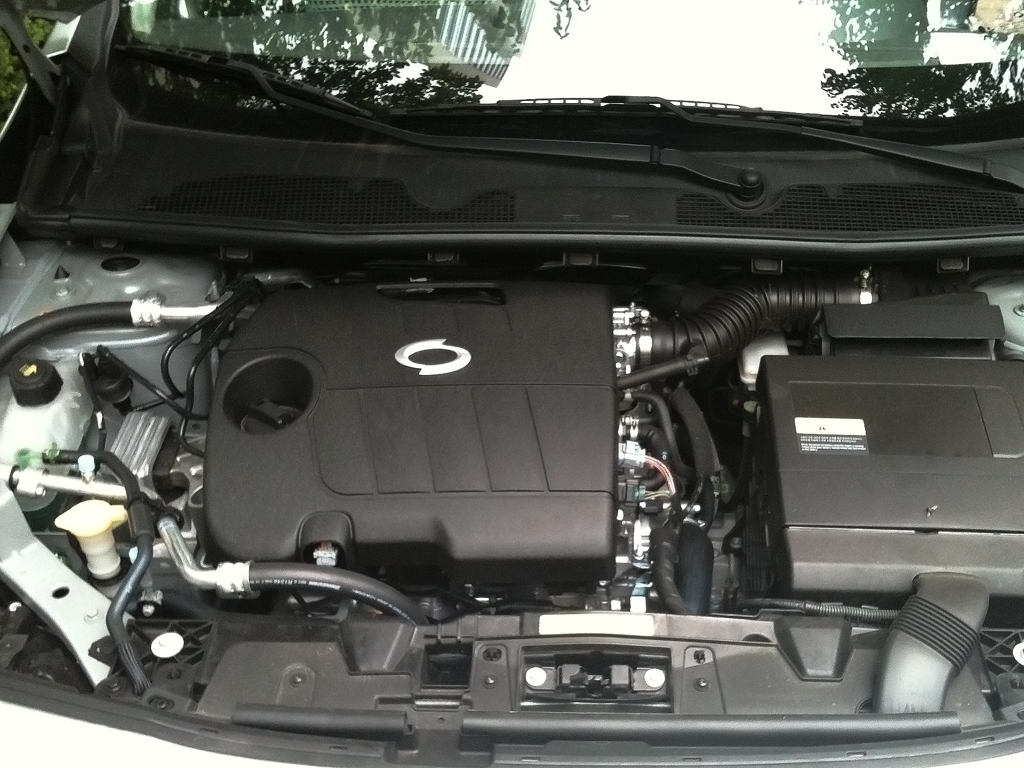
Engine compartment

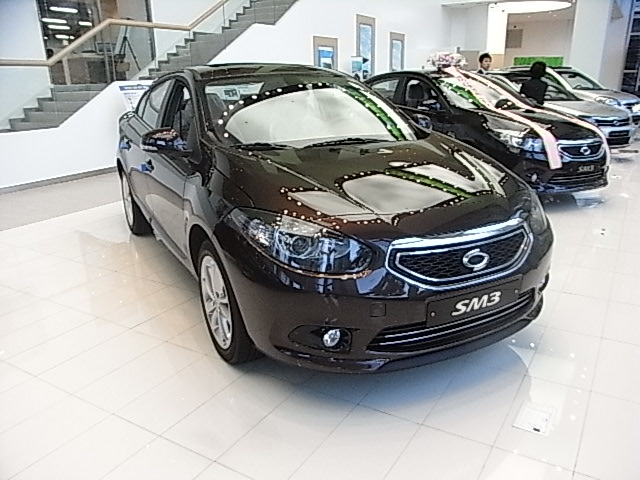
2013 model front view

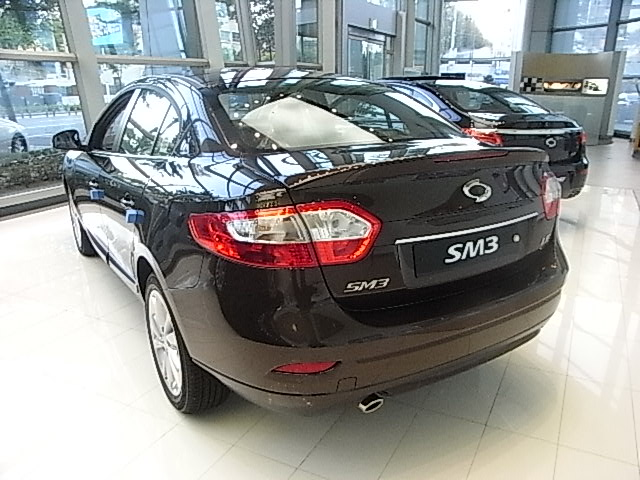
2013 model rear view

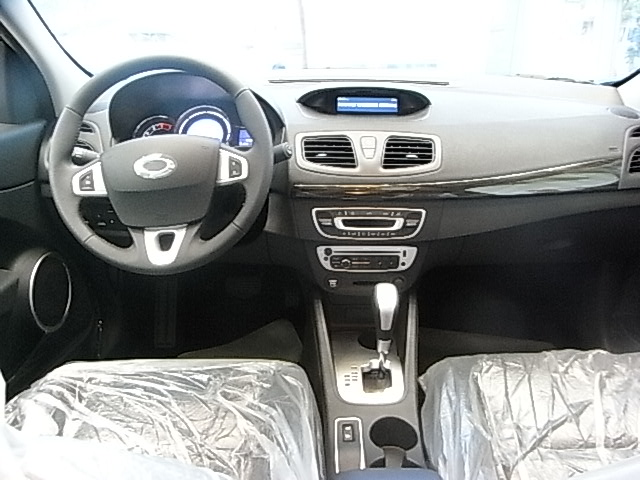
2013 model Cockpit

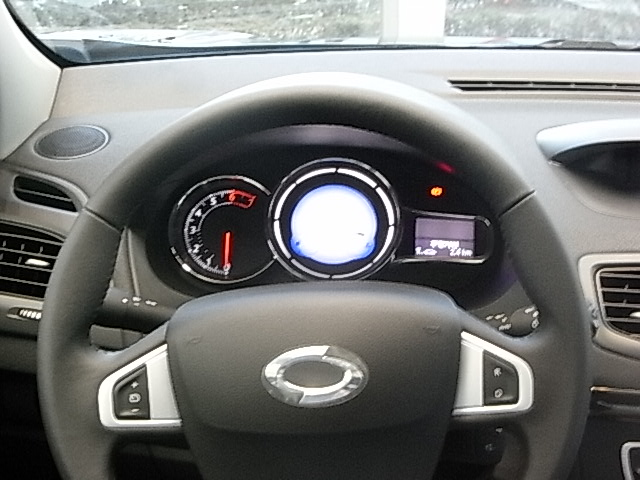
2013 model meter

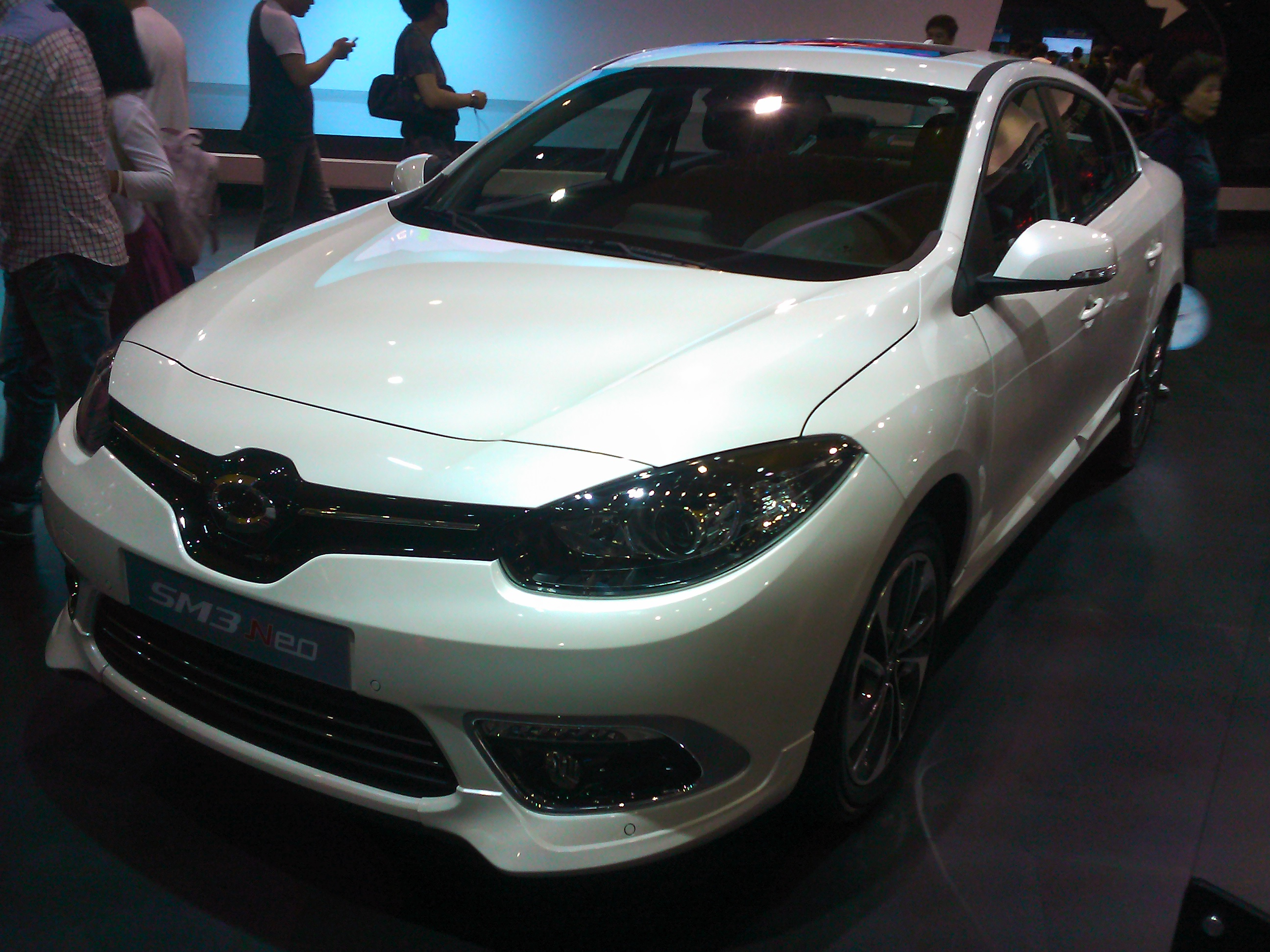
SM3 Neo front view

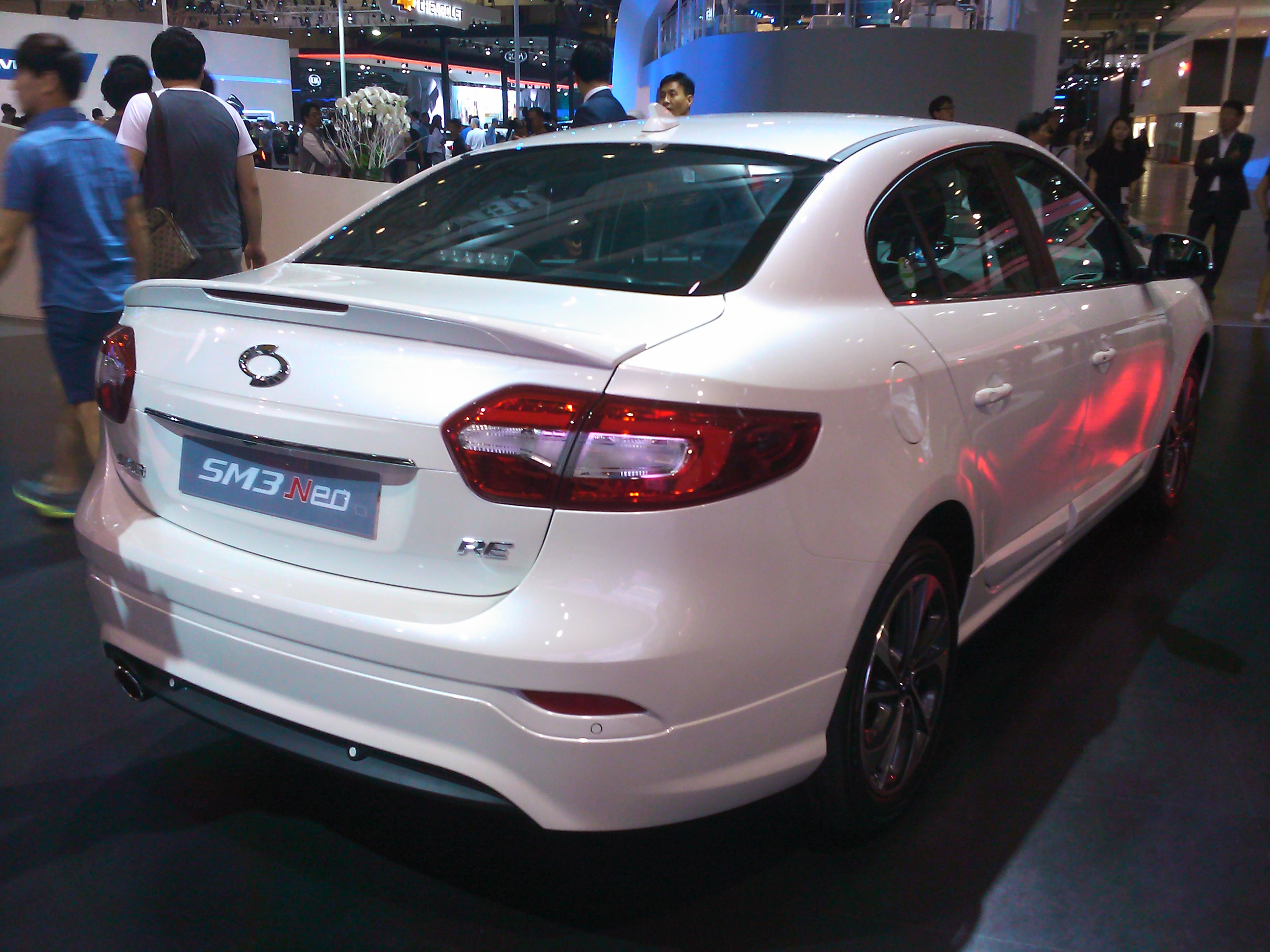
SM3 Neo rear view

=== SM3 Z.E. ===
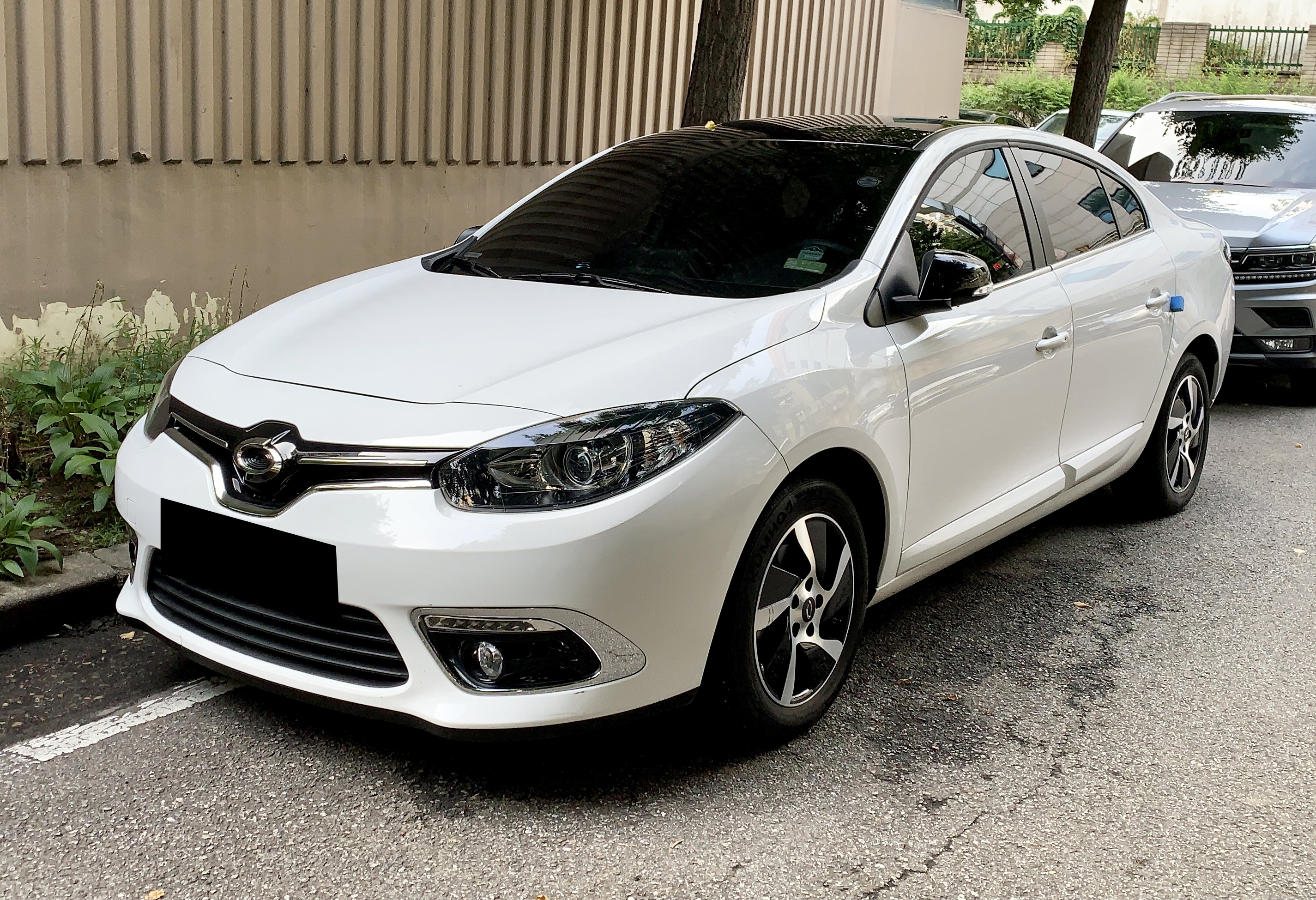
Renault Samsung SM3 Z.E.

At the 2011 Seoul Motor Show, Renault Samsung Motors unveiled an all-electric variant of the SM3 called the Z.E. It is based on the Renault Fluence Z.E. and is partly financed by the South Korean Government. The car entered into mass production at the Busan factory during October 2013. The company targets a production of about 4,000 units per year. In 2013, its second marketing year and the first of South Korean assembly, the SM3 Z.E. was leader in electric vehicle sales, with a market share of 58% and 453 cars sold. The company attributed this to its AC-3 charger, its greater range compared to rivals and a better warranty for the battery.

In November 2017, company introduced new SM3 Z.E. with range increased by 57 percent to 213 kilometers (132.3 miles) based on the Korean type approval cycle.
