= CVVTCS =

Automobile variable valve timing technology

Continuous Variable Valve Timing Control System (CVVTCS) is an automobile variable valve timing technology developed by Nissan. It is also used in a twin CVTC configuration on engines like the Nissan Juke's MR16DDT engine. CVVTCS is the successor to Nissan's earlier valve timing implementation NVCS.

== Engines with CVVTCS ==
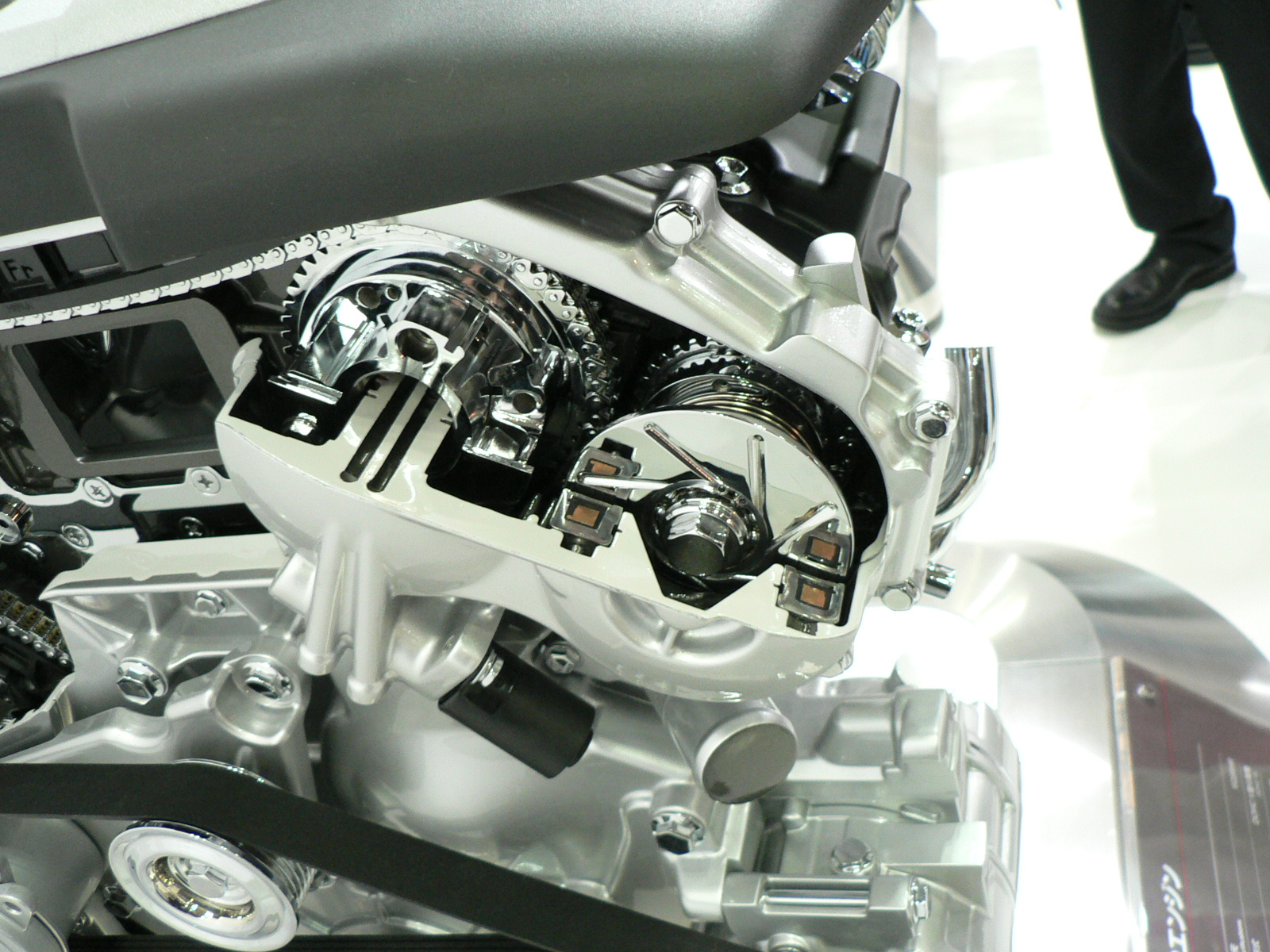
VQ35HR engine with CVTCS (intake) and eVTC (exhaust)

- HR15DE
- HR16DE
- HR12DE
- MR18DE
- MRA8DE (twin intake/exhaust)
- MR20DE
- MR16DDT (twin intake/exhaust)
- QR25DE
- VQ23DE
- VQ25DET
- VQ25DD (NEO-Di)(eVTC)
- VQ30DD (NEO-Di)(eVTC)
- VQ25HR (twin intake/exhaust) (eVTC)
- VQ35DE (single intake/twin exhaust on some variants)
- VQ35HR (twin intake/exhaust) (eVTC)
- VQ37VHR (twin intake/exhaust) (eVTC) (also uses Variable Valve Event and Lift)
- VQ40DE
- VR38DETT
- VK45DE
- VK50VE (twin intake/exhaust) (also uses Variable Valve Event and Lift)
- VK56DE (2007+)
- VK56VD (twin intake/exhaust) (also uses Variable Valve Event and Lift)

== See also ==
- Nissan Variable Cam Timing
- Nissan Variable Valve Event and Lift
- Nissan Variable Valve Lift and Timing
