= Renault Scala =

The Renault Scala nameplate has been used by the French automobile manufacturer Renault for the following cars, in the following markets:

- Renault Samsung SM3, in Mexico, Egypt, Cuba and Colombia from 2010–2013
- Nissan Almera (also as Latio, Sunny and Versa), in India from 2012–2017
- Renault Mégane, in Iran from 2013–2016
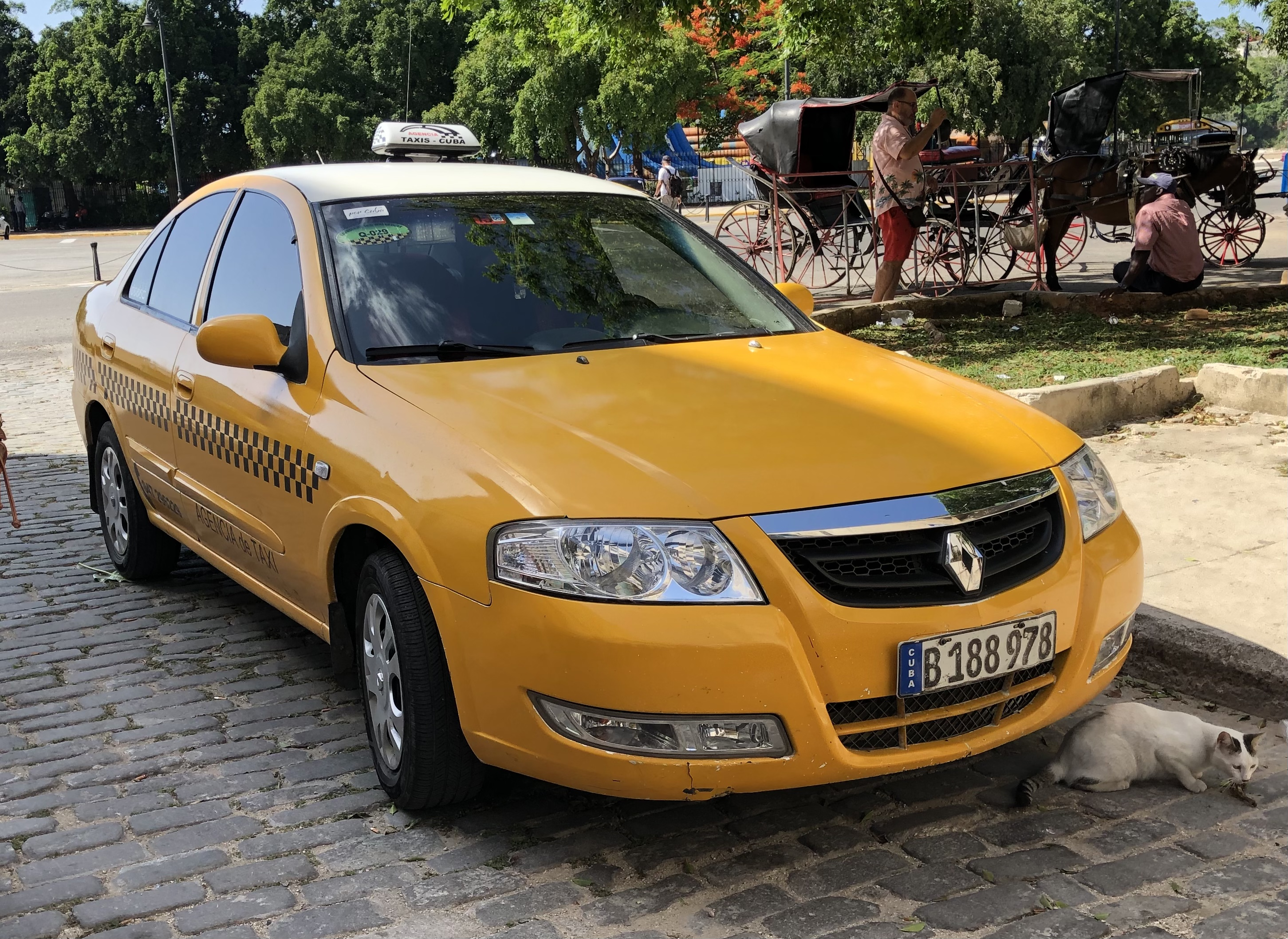
2010–2013 Renault Scala

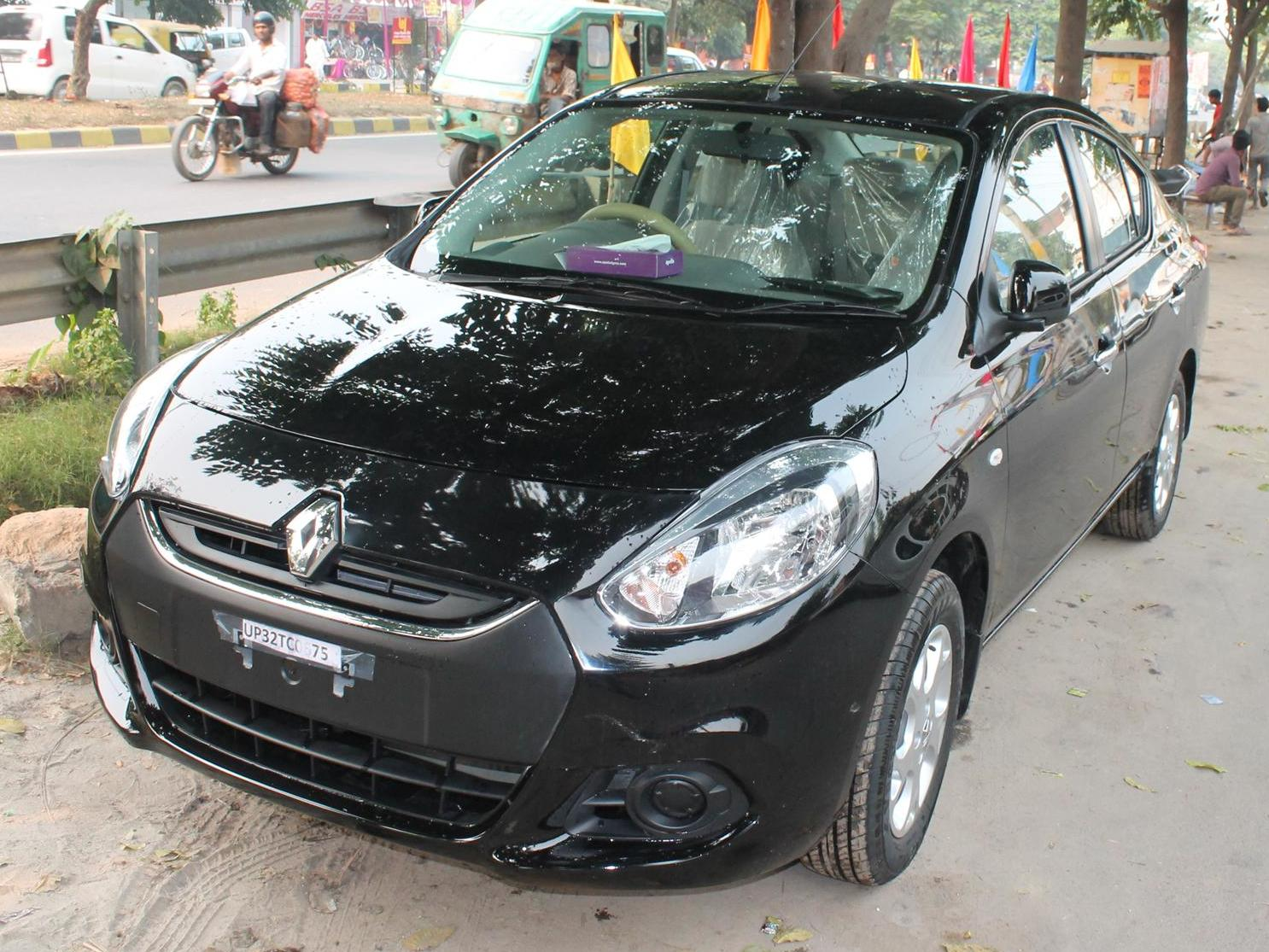
2012–2017 Renault Scala
