= Variable Valve Event and Lift =

Automobile variable valve timing technology

Nissan Variable Valve Event and Lift (commonly abbreviated as VVEL) is an automobile variable valve timing technology developed by Nissan.

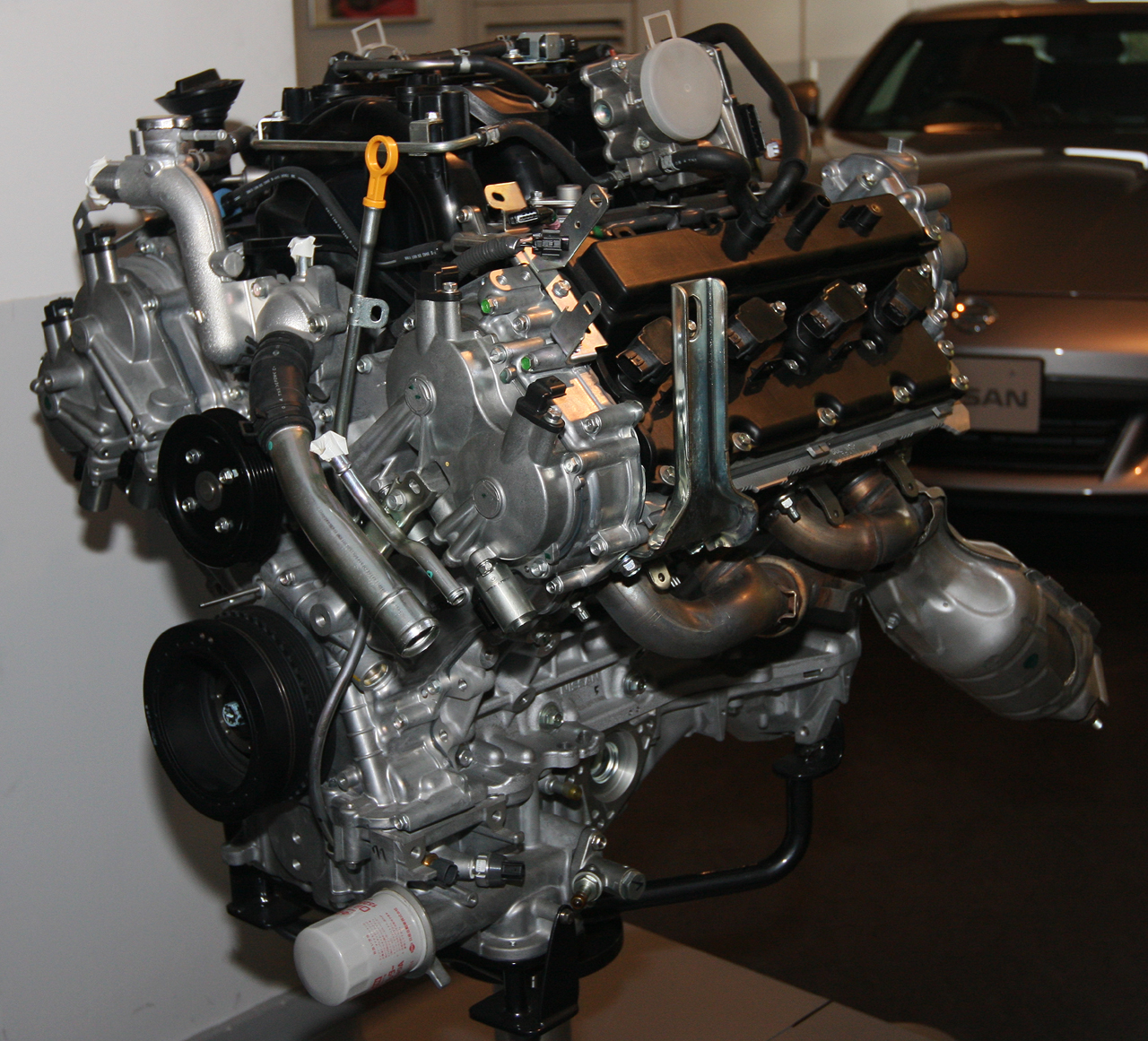
Nissan VK50VE Engine.

Nissan VVEL was first introduced to the US market in late-2007 on the 2008 Infiniti G37 Coupe sporting the new "VVEL" VQ37VHR engine (VQ37VHR motor specs: 11.0:1 CR, 95.5mm bore, 86mm stroke, 7500rpm redline). VVEL variable valve timing is also used in the VK50VE V8 engine from the Infiniti FX50.

A rocker arm and two types of links open the intake-valves by transferring the rotational movement of a drive shaft with an eccentric cam to the output cam. The movement of the output cam is varied by rotating the control shaft with a DC stepper motor and changing the fulcrums of the links. This makes the continuous adjustment of the amount of the valve's lift (e.g., the amount of intake opening), during the intake valve event in the four-stroke cycle, possible. CVTC and VVEL together control the valve phases and its valve events, allowing free-control of the valve timing and lift. This results in more efficient airflow to the cylinder, significantly improved responsiveness, optimizing the balance between power and environmental performance.

It performs similarly to BMW's Valvetronic system but with desmodromic control of the output cam, allowing VVEL to operate at higher engine speeds (RPM). Other similar systems are offered by Toyota (Valvematic).

== See also ==
- Nissan Continuous Variable Valve Timing Control
- Nissan Variable Cam Timing
- Nissan Variable Valve Lift and Timing
