= Nissan VK engine =

Nissan VK
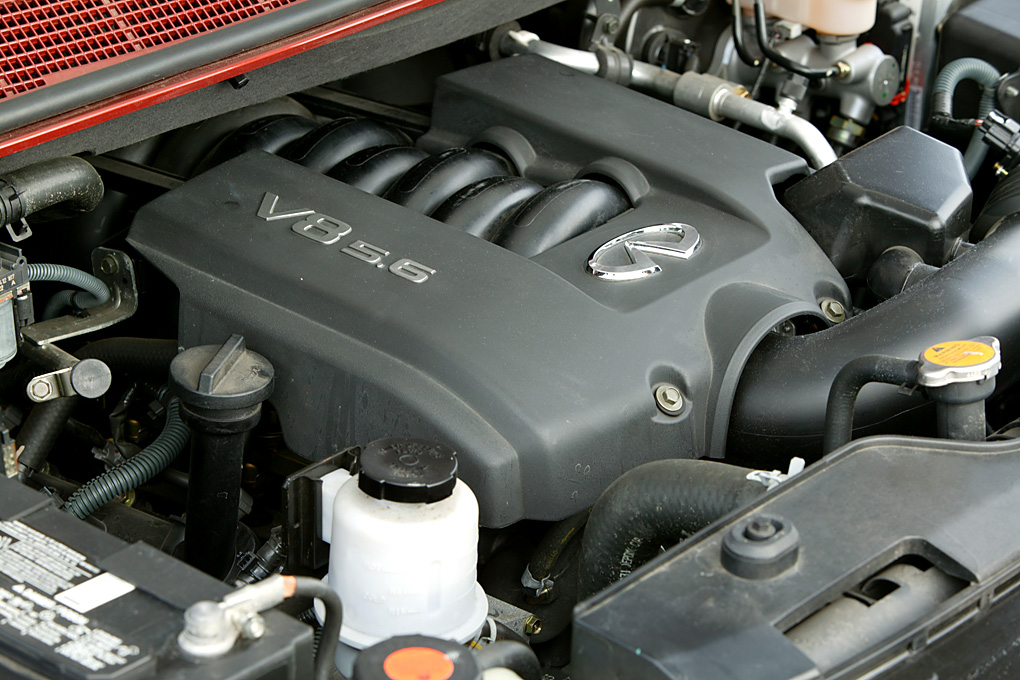

Overview
- Manufacturer: Nissan (Nissan Machinery)
- Production: 2002–present

Layout
- Configuration: 90° V8
- Displacement: 4.5 L; 274.2 cu in (4,494 cc); 5.0 L; 306.7 cu in (5,026 cc); 5.6 L; 338.8 cu in (5,552 cc)
- Cylinder bore: 93 mm (3.66 in); 95.5 mm (3.76 in); 98 mm (3.86 in)
- Piston stroke: 82.7 mm (3.26 in); 87.7 mm (3.45 in); 92 mm (3.62 in)
- Cylinder block material: Aluminium
- Cylinder head material: Aluminium
- Valvetrain: DOHC 4 valves x cyl. with CVTCS and VVEL (some versions)
- Compression ratio: 11.0:1, 10.9:1

Combustion
- Fuel system: SFI, GDI
- Fuel type: Gasoline
- Cooling system: Water cooled

Output
- Power output: 305–650 hp (227.4–484.7 kW)
- Torque output: 385–485 lb⋅ft (522.0–657.6 N⋅m)

Chronology
- Predecessor: Nissan VH

The VK engine is a V8 piston engine from Nissan. It is an aluminum DOHC 4-valve design.

The VK engine was originally based on Nissan's VQ V6 rather than the VH V8 used in previous Q45/Cima models. Changes include: a variable intake manifold, newly designed heads, and a larger drive by wire throttle chamber. The intake manifold directs air through different paths at different engine speeds to optimise low-end torque or high-end horsepower.

== VK45DE ==
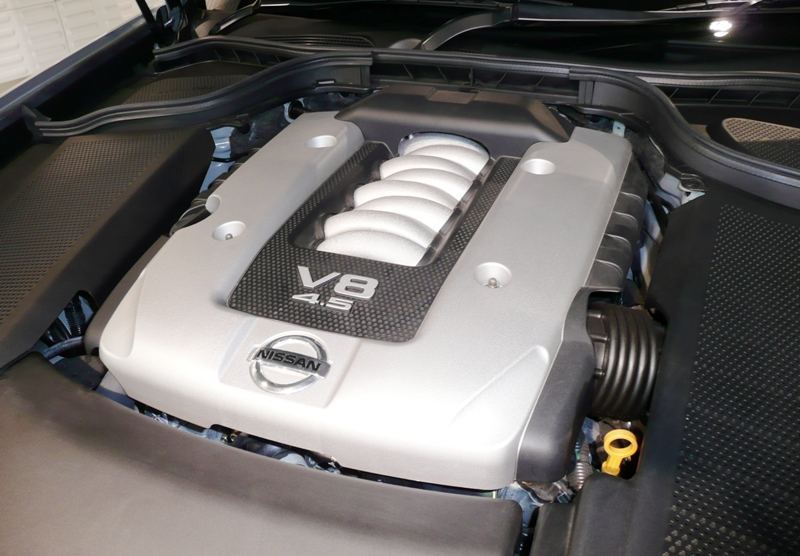
VK45DE

The 4,494 cc (4.5 L; 274.2 cu in) VK45DE was introduced in 2002 and is built in Yokohama, Japan. Bore and stroke is 93 mm × 82.7 mm (3.66 in × 3.26 in). Output is 340 hp (254 kW; 345 PS) at 6,400 rpm with 46 kg⋅m (451 N⋅m; 333 lbf⋅ft) of torque at 4,000 rpm. Redline is at 6,600 rpm. It has an aluminum engine block and aluminum DOHC cylinder heads. It uses SFI, has four titanium valves per cylinder with Continuous Variable Valve Timing and features forged steel connecting rods, four one-piece cast camshafts, an unusual variable-flow induction system optimizes airflow for low- and high-speed operation, low-friction molybdenum-coated pistons, and a microfinished forged crankshaft.

=== Motorsport ===
A flat-plane crankshaft version of the VK45DE was used by Nismo for Super GT races with the Nissan GT-R instead of using the GT-R's VR38DETT twin-turbo V6 engine. The VK45DE was previously used in Nissan's 350Z Super GT car in 2007, replacing the previous VQ30DETT used in that car. In race trim, the Super GT VK45DE produces 500 PS (368 kW; 493 hp) and 52 kg⋅m (510 N⋅m; 376 lbf⋅ft) of torque. The engine idles at around 3,500 rpm and is restricted to the above specified power output. Without such restrictions, the engine is reputedly capable of producing nearly 800 PS (588 kW; 789 hp). Nismo reasons that by using the engine, they eliminate turbo lag, save weight and generally prefer the torque curve of the atmospheric V8. Also in the Super GT series, an unbranded VK45DE is used for "Mother Chassis" cars; the engine is labeled the GTA V8.

=== Applications ===
Years	Model	Power output	Torque
2002–2006	Infiniti Q45	340 hp (254 kW)	46 kg⋅m (451 N⋅m; 333 lbf⋅ft)
2003–2008	Infiniti FX45	320 hp (239 kW)	46.5 kg⋅m (456 N⋅m; 336 lbf⋅ft)
2003–2004	Infiniti M45	340 hp (254 kW)	46 kg⋅m (451 N⋅m; 333 lbf⋅ft)
2006–2010	Infiniti M45	325 hp (242 kW)	47 kg⋅m (461 N⋅m; 340 lbf⋅ft)
2004–2010	Nissan Fuga 450 GT	333 hp (248 kW)	47 kg⋅m (461 N⋅m; 340 lbf⋅ft)
2003–2010	Nissan President	276 hp (206 kW)	46 kg⋅m (451 N⋅m; 333 lbf⋅ft)
2007	Super GT Nissan 350Z	490 hp (365 kW)	52.5 kg⋅m (515 N⋅m; 380 lbf⋅ft) (Non-Production)
2008–2009	Super GT Nissan GT-R	490 hp (365 kW)	52.5 kg⋅m (515 N⋅m; 380 lbf⋅ft) (Non-Production)
2011–2016	Various LMP2 racing cars	450 hp (336 kW)	59.4 kg⋅m (583 N⋅m; 430 lbf⋅ft) (Non-Production)
2014–present	Super GT "Mother Chassis" cars	450 hp (336 kW)	59.4 kg⋅m (583 N⋅m; 430 lbf⋅ft) (Non-Production)

== VK45DD ==
The VK45DD is a 4,494 cc (4.5 L; 274.2 cu in) V8 engine that is very similar to the VK45DE but adds a direct injection fuel system. This was Nissan's first V8 with direct injection (NEO-Di). It officially produces 280 PS (206 kW; 276 hp) at 6,000 rpm and 46 kg⋅m (451 N⋅m; 333 lbf⋅ft) at 3,600 rpm, but it has unofficially over 300 PS (221 kW; 296 hp). It has a compression ratio of 11.0:1, and a bore and stroke of 93 mm × 82.7 mm (3.66 in × 3.26 in).

=== Applications ===
- 2001–2004 Nissan Cima (JDM)

== VK50VE ==
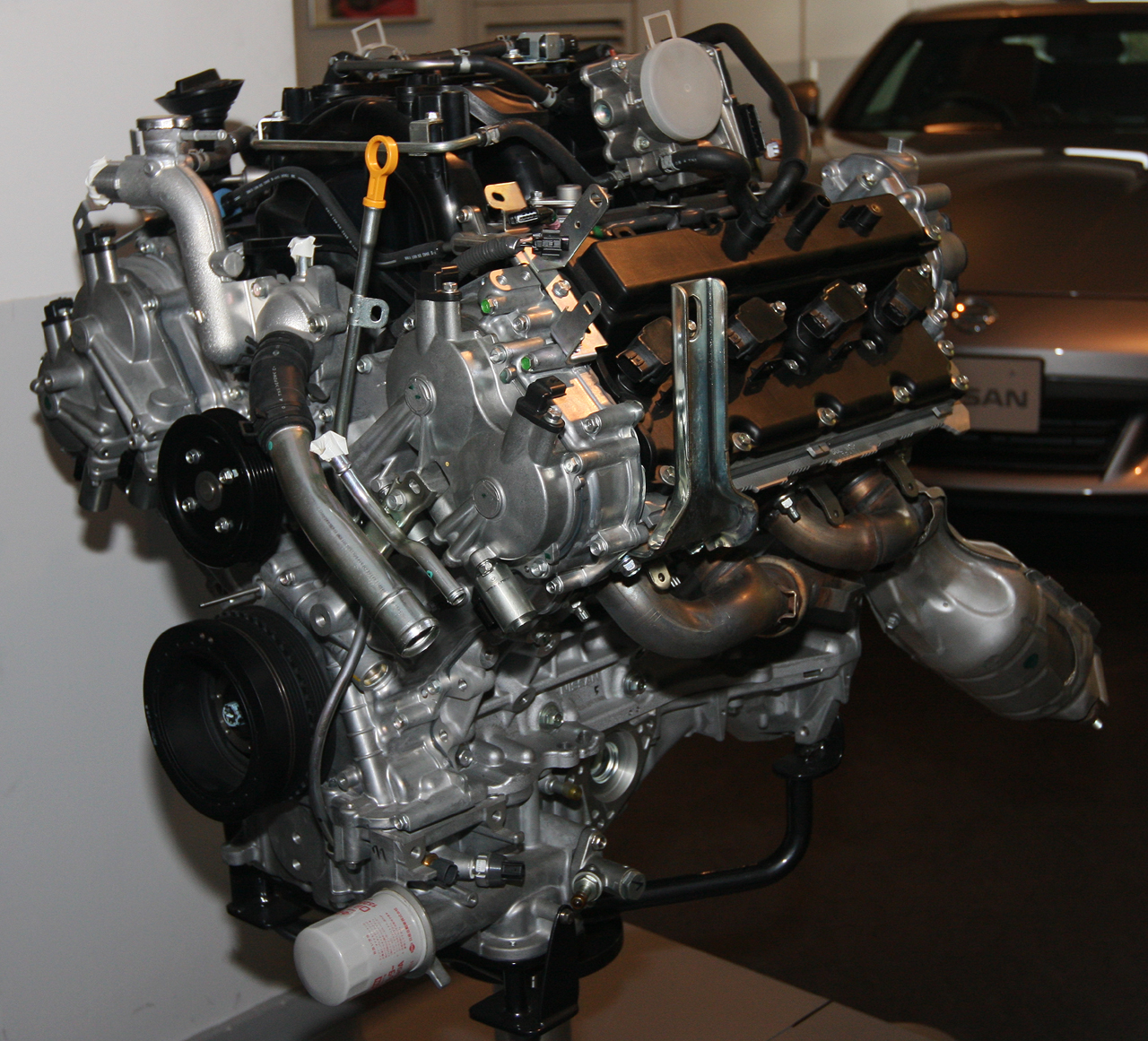
Nissan VK50VE Engine.

The VK50VE is a 5,026 cc (5.0 L; 306.7 cu in) V8 engine with 390 hp (291 kW) at 6,500 rpm and 51 kg⋅m (500 N⋅m; 369 lbf⋅ft) at 4,400 rpm and redline is set at 6,800 rpm. Bore x stroke are 95.5 mm × 87.7 mm (3.76 in × 3.45 in) and compression ratio is 10.9:1. The valvetrain is a dual overhead cam (DOHC) design with a continuously variable valve timing control system (CVTCS). The engine also features Nissan's VVEL valve timing technology.

=== Applications ===
- 2009–2013 Infiniti FX50
- 2014 Infiniti QX70
- 2015–2019 various LMP3 race cars

== VK56DE ==
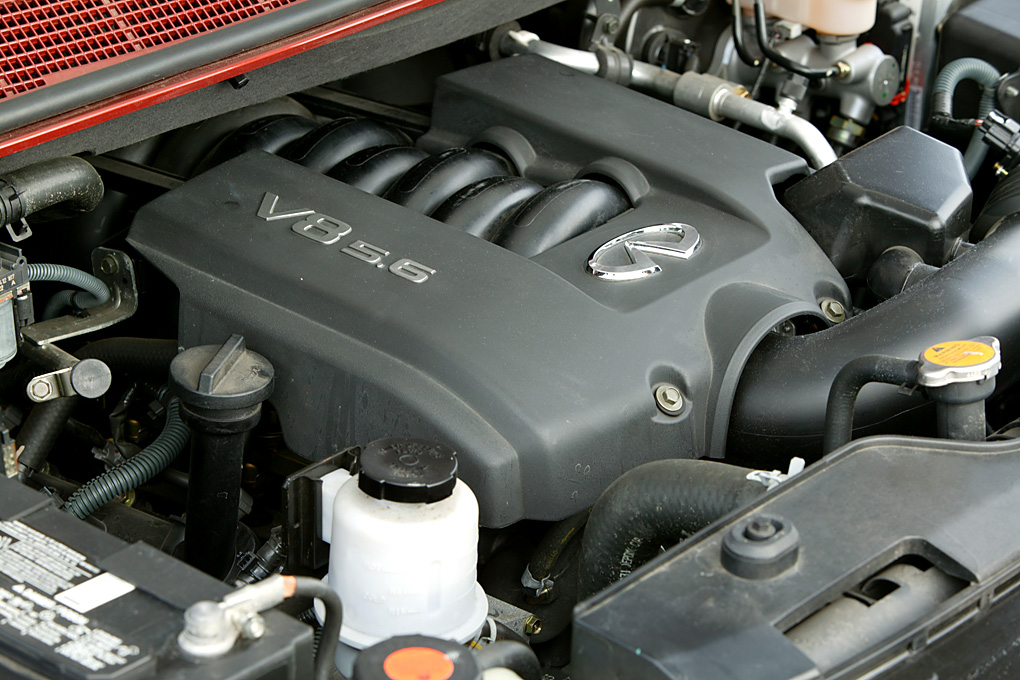
Nissan VK56DE engine.

The VK56DE is a 5,552 cc (5.6 L; 338.8 cu in) version built in Decherd, Tennessee. Bore and stroke is 98 mm × 92 mm (3.9 in × 3.6 in). Output is 317–320 hp (236–239 kW; 321–324 PS) at 4,900 rpm with 522 to 533 N⋅m (385 to 393 lb⋅ft) of torque at 3,600 rpm. It has aluminum-alloy block and heads and low-friction molybdenum-coated pistons. The valvetrain is a dual overhead cam (DOHC) design with a continuously variable valve timing control system (CVTCS) on the intake valves. It also has four valves per cylinder with micro-finished camshafts and ductile iron cylinder liners for increased durability.

=== Motorsport ===
Nismo used the VK56DE for FIA GT1 racing in the Nissan GT-R GT1 from 2010 to 2011. In race trim, it produced 600 hp (447 kW) and 650 N⋅m (479 lbf⋅ft) of torque.

The Nissan Motorsport VK56DE was launched in Australia for the V8 Supercars Championship in 2013 by Kelly Racing in Melbourne. The engine has been reduced in capacity to 4,990 cc (5.0 L; 304.5 cu in) to fit the V8 Supercars regulations. It has a bore and stroke of 102.69 mm × 75.31 mm (4.04 in × 2.96 in). It was fitted to a Nissan Altima version of the V8 Supercars "Car of the Future" specification that competed from 2013 until 2019.

In 2020, as part of the LMP3 class of sports prototypes entering into a second generation, the FIA updated the spec engine for the category from the smaller VK50VE engine to the VK56DE, with a power increase to 455 HP, up from the 420 HP of the previous generation. The VK56DE was used until the end of the 2024 Season, due to the engine going out of production.

=== Applications ===
Years	Model	Power output	Torque
Production cars
2004–2015	Nissan Armada	305 to 317 hp (227 to 236 kW)	53.2 kg⋅m (522 N⋅m; 385 lbf⋅ft)
2004–2015	Nissan Titan	305 to 317 hp (227 to 236 kW)	52.5 to 53.2 kg⋅m (515 to 522 N⋅m; 380 to 385 lbf⋅ft)
2004–2010	Infiniti QX56	315 to 320 hp (235 to 239 kW)	54 to 54.4 kg⋅m (530 to 533 N⋅m; 391 to 393 lbf⋅ft)
2010–2016	Nissan Patrol	320 hp (239 kW)	54.4 kg⋅m (533 N⋅m; 393 lbf⋅ft)
2008–2012	Nissan Pathfinder	310 hp (231 kW)	53.5 kg⋅m (525 N⋅m; 387 lbf⋅ft)
2012–2016	Nissan NV2500 HD	317 hp (236 kW)	53.2 kg⋅m (522 N⋅m; 385 lbf⋅ft)
2012–2016	Nissan NV3500 HD	317 hp (236 kW)	53.2 kg⋅m (522 N⋅m; 385 lbf⋅ft)
2012–2016	Nissan NV Passenger	317 hp (236 kW)	53.2 kg⋅m (522 N⋅m; 385 lbf⋅ft)
Racing cars
2009–2011	Nissan GT-R GT1	600 hp (447 kW)	66.3 kg⋅m (650 N⋅m; 480 lbf⋅ft) (Non-Production)
2013–2019	Nissan Altima, Supercars Championship	650 hp (485 kW)	67 kg⋅m (657 N⋅m; 485 lbf⋅ft) (Non-Production)
2020–2024	Various LMP3 racing cars	420 bhp (313 kW) (Non-production)	

Notes:

- The Titan, Armada, and Pathfinder power figures are for regular 87 octane fuel. The 320 hp (239 kW) Infiniti QX56 & Nissan Patrol are tuned for premium (91+ octane) fuel.
- Some VK56DE powered vehicles are E85 capable.

== VK56VD ==
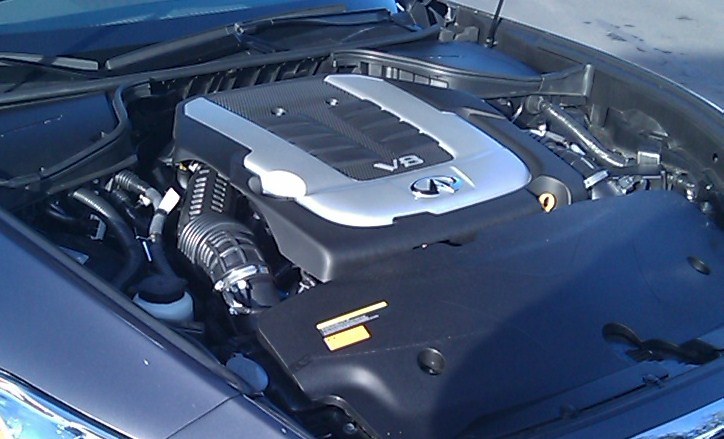
Nissan/Infiniti VK56VD Engine.

The VK56VD is a 5,552 cc (5.6 L; 338.8 cu in) 32-valve, DOHC, Direct Injection Gasoline (DIG) aluminum-alloy V8 and features Nissan's latest VVEL (Variable Valve Event & Lift System). The direct injection system provides better wide-open throttle performance and improved fuel economy and emissions performance by reducing engine knock, improving combustion stability and controlling injection more precisely. Production ended in 2024.

=== Applications ===
Years	Model	Power output	Torque
2010–2023	Nissan Patrol	400 hp (298 kW)	57.1 kg⋅m (560 N⋅m; 413 lbf⋅ft)
2016–2023	Nissan Patrol Nismo	428 hp (319 kW)	57.6 kg⋅m (565 N⋅m; 417 lbf⋅ft)
2011–2024	Infiniti QX80	400 hp (298 kW)	57.1 kg⋅m (560 N⋅m; 413 lbf⋅ft)
2011–2013	Infiniti M56	420 hp (313 kW)	57.6 kg⋅m (565 N⋅m; 417 lbf⋅ft)
2014–2019	Infiniti Q70	420 to 436 hp (313 to 325 kW)	57.1 to 57.6 kg⋅m (560 to 565 N⋅m; 413 to 417 lbf⋅ft)
2017–2021	Nissan NV2500 HD	375 hp (280 kW)	53.5 kg⋅m (525 N⋅m; 387 lbf⋅ft)
2017–2021	Nissan NV3500 HD	375 hp (280 kW)	53.5 kg⋅m (525 N⋅m; 387 lbf⋅ft)
2017–2021	Nissan NV Passenger	375 hp (280 kW)	53.5 kg⋅m (525 N⋅m; 387 lbf⋅ft)
2017–2024	Nissan Titan	400 hp (298 kW)	57.1 kg⋅m (560 N⋅m; 413 lbf⋅ft)
2017–2023	Nissan Armada	390–400 hp (291–298 kW)	54.6–57.1 kg⋅m (535–560 N⋅m; 395–413 lbf⋅ft)

== See also ==
- List of Nissan engines
- Nissan VRH Racing Engines
