= Variable valve timing =

Process of altering the timing of a valve lift event

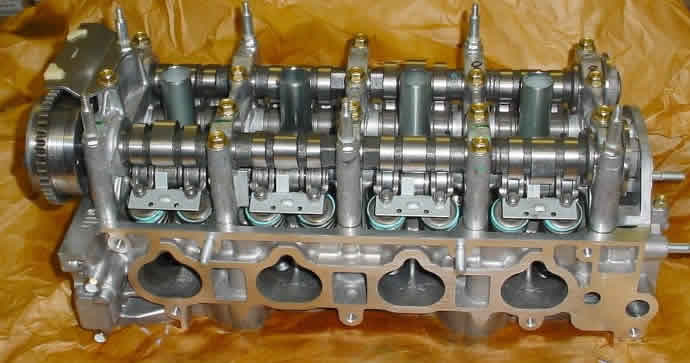
Cylinder head of Honda K20Z3. This engine uses continuously variable timing for the inlet valves

Variable valve timing (VVT) is the process of altering the timing of a valve lift event in an internal combustion engine, and is often used to improve performance, fuel economy or emissions. It is increasingly being used in combination with variable valve lift systems. There are many ways in which this can be achieved, ranging from mechanical devices to electro-hydraulic and camless systems. Increasingly strict emissions regulations are causing many automotive manufacturers to use VVT systems.

Two-stroke engines use a power valve system to get similar results to VVT.

== Background theory ==
The valves within an internal combustion engine are used to control the flow of the intake and exhaust gases into and out of the combustion chamber. The timing, duration and lift of these valve events has a significant impact on engine performance. Without variable valve timing (variable valve lift), the valve timing is the same for all engine speeds and conditions, therefore compromises are necessary to achieve the desired result in intake and exhaust efficiency . This has been described in simulations. Practical results will vary based on available ambient combustion cycle gases in a naturally aspirated system, or forced air geometry as well as fuel pulse width timing and other factors which may or may not be available on vehicles equipped with variable valve timing. An engine equipped with a variable valve timing actuation system is freed from this constraint, allowing performance to be improved over the engine operating range.

Piston engines normally use valves which are driven by camshafts. The cams open (lift) the valves for a certain amount of time (duration) during each intake and exhaust cycle. The timing of the valve opening and closing, relative to the position of the crankshaft, is important. The camshaft is driven by the crankshaft through timing belts, gears or chains.

An engine requires large amounts of air when operating at high speeds. However, the intake valves may close before enough air has entered each combustion chamber, reducing performance. On the other hand, if the camshaft keeps the valves open for longer periods of time, as with a racing cam, problems start to occur at the lower engine speeds. Opening the intake valve while the exhaust valve is still open may cause unburnt fuel to exit the engine, leading to lower engine performance and increased emissions. According to engineer David Vizard's book "Building Horsepower", when both intake & exhaust are open simultaneously, the much-higher-pressure exhaust pushes the intake-charge back, out from the cylinder, polluting the intake manifold with exhaust.

=== Continuous versus discrete ===
Early variable valve timing systems used discrete (stepped) adjustment. For example, one timing would be used below 3500 rpm and another used above 3500 rpm.

More advanced variable valve timing systems offer continuous (infinite) adjustment of the valve timing. Therefore, the timing can be optimized to suit all engine speeds and conditions.

=== Cam phasing versus variable duration ===
The simplest form of VVT is cam-phasing, whereby the phase angle of the camshaft is rotated forwards or backwards relative to the crankshaft. Thus the valves open and close earlier or later; however, the camshaft lift and duration cannot be altered solely with a cam-phasing system.

Achieving variable duration on a VVT system requires a complex system, such as multiple cam profiles or oscillating cams.

== Typical effect of timing adjustments ==
=== Late intake valve closing (LIVC) ===
The first variation of continuous variable valve timing involves holding the intake valve open slightly longer than a traditional engine, emulating the Atkinson cycle. This results in the piston actually pushing air out of the cylinder and back into the intake manifold during the compression stroke. The air which is expelled fills the manifold with higher pressure, and on subsequent intake strokes the air which is taken in is at a higher pressure. Late intake valve closing has been shown to reduce pumping losses by 40% during partial load conditions, and to decrease nitric oxide (NOx) emissions by 24%. Peak engine torque showed only a 1% decline, and hydrocarbon emissions were unchanged.

=== Early intake valve closing (EIVC) ===
Another way to decrease the pumping losses associated with low engine speed, high vacuum conditions is by closing the intake valve earlier than normal. This involves closing the intake valve midway through the intake stroke. Air/fuel demands are so low at low-load conditions and the work required to fill the cylinder is relatively high, so early intake valve closing greatly reduces pumping losses. Studies have shown early intake valve closing reduces pumping losses by 40%, and increases fuel economy by 7%. It also reduced nitric oxide emissions by 24% at partial load conditions. A possible downside to early intake valve closing is that it significantly lowers the temperature of the combustion chamber, which can increase hydrocarbon emissions. This is another way to emulate the Atkinson cycle, and is commonly used in forced induction Miller cycle engines.

=== Early intake valve opening ===
Early intake valve opening is another variation that has significant potential to reduce emissions. In a traditional engine, a process called valve overlap is used to aid in controlling the cylinder temperature. By opening the intake valve early, some of the inert/combusted exhaust gas will back flow out of the cylinder via the intake valve, where it cools momentarily in the intake manifold. This inert gas then fills the cylinder in the subsequent intake stroke, which aids in controlling the temperature of the cylinder and nitric oxide emissions. It also improves volumetric efficiency, because there is less exhaust gas to be expelled on the exhaust stroke.

=== Early/late exhaust valve closing ===
Early and late exhaust valve closing timing can be manipulated to reduce emissions. Traditionally, the exhaust valve opens, and exhaust gas is pushed out of the cylinder and into the exhaust manifold by the piston as it travels upward. By manipulating the timing of the exhaust valve, engineers can control how much exhaust gas is left in the cylinder. By holding the exhaust valve open slightly longer, the cylinder is emptied more and ready to be filled with a bigger air/fuel charge on the intake stroke. By closing the valve slightly early, more exhaust gas remains in the cylinder which increases fuel efficiency. In this operating mode, it behaves similarly to an EGR valve, and in some engines this replaces EGR altogether. This allows for more efficient operation under all conditions.

== Challenges ==
The main factor preventing this technology from wide use in production automobiles is the ability to produce a cost-effective means of controlling the valve timing under the conditions internal to an engine. An engine operating at 3000 revolutions per minute will rotate the camshaft 25 times per second, so the valve timing events have to occur at precise times to offer performance benefits. Electromagnetic and pneumatic camless valve actuators offer high control over valve timing, but remain difficult to produce cost-effectively for mass-market vehicles. Koenigsegg's Freevalve system, an automotive application of camless technology, was offered in the Gemera grand tourer when announced in 2020; however, the camless three-cylinder engine option was dropped prior to production in 2024 due to low customer demand in favor of a V8 option.

== History ==
=== Steam engines ===
The history of the search for a method of variable valve opening duration goes back to the age of steam engines when the valve opening duration was referred to as "steam cut-off”. The Stephenson valve gear, as used on early steam locomotives, supported variable cutoff, that is, changes to the time at which the admission of steam to the cylinders is cut off during the power stroke.

Early approaches to variable cutoff coupled variations in admission cutoff with variations in exhaust cutoff. Admission and exhaust cutoff were decoupled with the development of the Corliss valve. These were widely used in constant speed variable load stationary engines, with admission cutoff, and therefore torque, mechanically controlled by a centrifugal governor and trip valves.

As poppet valves came into use, a simplified valve gear using a camshaft came into use. With such engines, variable cutoff could be achieved with variable profile cams that were shifted along the camshaft by the governor. The Serpollet steamcars produced very hot high pressure steam, requiring poppet valves, and these used a patented sliding camshaft mechanism, which not only varied the inlet valve cut-off but allowed the engine to be reversed.

=== Aircraft ===
An early experimental 200 hp Clerget V-8 from the 1910s used a sliding camshaft to change the valve timing. Some versions of the Bristol Jupiter radial engine of the early 1920s incorporated variable valve timing gear, mainly to vary the inlet valve timing in connection with higher compression ratios. The Lycoming R-7755 engine had a Variable Valve Timing system consisting of two cams that can be selected by the pilot. One for take off, pursuit and escape, the other for economical cruising.

=== Automotive ===
The desirability of being able to vary the valve opening duration to match an engine's rotational speed first became apparent in the 1920s when maximum allowable RPM limits were generally starting to rise. Until about this time an engine's idle RPM and its operating RPM were very similar, meaning that there was little need for variable valve duration. The first use of variable valve timing was on the 1903 Cadillac Runabout and Tonneau created by Alanson Partridge Brush Patent 767,794 “INLET VALVE GEAR FOR INTERNAL COMBUSTION ENGINES” filed August 3, 1903, and granted August 16, 1904. Some time prior to 1919 Lawrence Pomeroy, Vauxhall's Chief Designer, had designed a 4.4 L engine for a proposed replacement for the existing 30-98 model to be called the H-Type. In this engine the single overhead camshaft was to move longitudinally to allow different camshaft lobes to be engaged. It was in the 1920s that the first patents for variable duration valve opening started appearing – for example United States patent U.S. patent 1,527,456.

In 1958 Porsche made application for a German Patent, also applied for and published as British Patent GB861369 in 1959. The Porsche patent used an oscillating cam to increase the valve lift and duration. The desmodromic cam driven via a push/pull rod from an eccentric shaft or swashplate. It is unknown if any working prototype was ever made.

Fiat was the first auto manufacturer to patent a functional automotive variable valve timing system which included variable lift. Developed by Giovanni Torazza in the late 1960s, the system used hydraulic pressure to vary the fulcrum of the cam followers (US Patent 3,641,988). The hydraulic pressure changed according to engine speed and intake pressure. The typical opening variation was 37%.

Alfa Romeo was the first manufacturer to use a variable valve timing system in production cars (US Patent 4,231,330). The fuel injected models of the 1980 Alfa Romeo Spider 2000 had a mechanical VVT system. The system was engineered by Ing Giampaolo Garcea in the 1970s. All Alfa Romeo Spider models from 1983 onward used electronic VVT.

In 1989, Honda released the VTEC system. While the earlier Nissan NVCS alters the phasing of the camshaft, VTEC switches to a separate cam profile at high engine speeds to improve peak power. The first VTEC engine Honda produced was the B16A which was installed in the Integra, CRX, and Civic hatchback available in Japan and Europe.

In 1992, Porsche first introduced VarioCam, which was the first system to provide continuous adjustment (all previous systems used discrete adjustment). The system was released in the Porsche 968 and operated on the intake valves only.

==== Motorcycles ====
Variable valve timing has been applied to motorcycle engines but was considered a non-useful "technological showpiece" as late as 2004 due to the system's weight penalty. Since then, motorcycles including VVT have included the Kawasaki 1400GTR/Concours 14 (2007), the Ducati Multistrada 1200 (2015), the BMW R1250GS (2019) and the Yamaha YZF-R15 V3.0 (2017), the Suzuki GSX-R1000R 2017 L7, the Moto Guzzi V85TT, the Harley Davidson Milwaukee-Eight, the KTM 1390 Super Duke.

=== Marine ===
Variable valve timing has begun to trickle down to marine engines. Volvo Penta's VVT marine engine uses a cam phaser, controlled by the ECM, which continuously varies advancement or retardation of the camshaft timing.

=== Diesel ===
In 2007, Caterpillar developed the C13 and C15 Acert engines which used VVT technology to reduce NOx emissions, to avoid the use of EGR after 2002 EPA requirements.

In 2010, Mitsubishi developed and started mass production of its 4N13 1.8 L DOHC I4, the world's first passenger car diesel engine that features a variable valve timing system.

== Automotive nomenclature ==
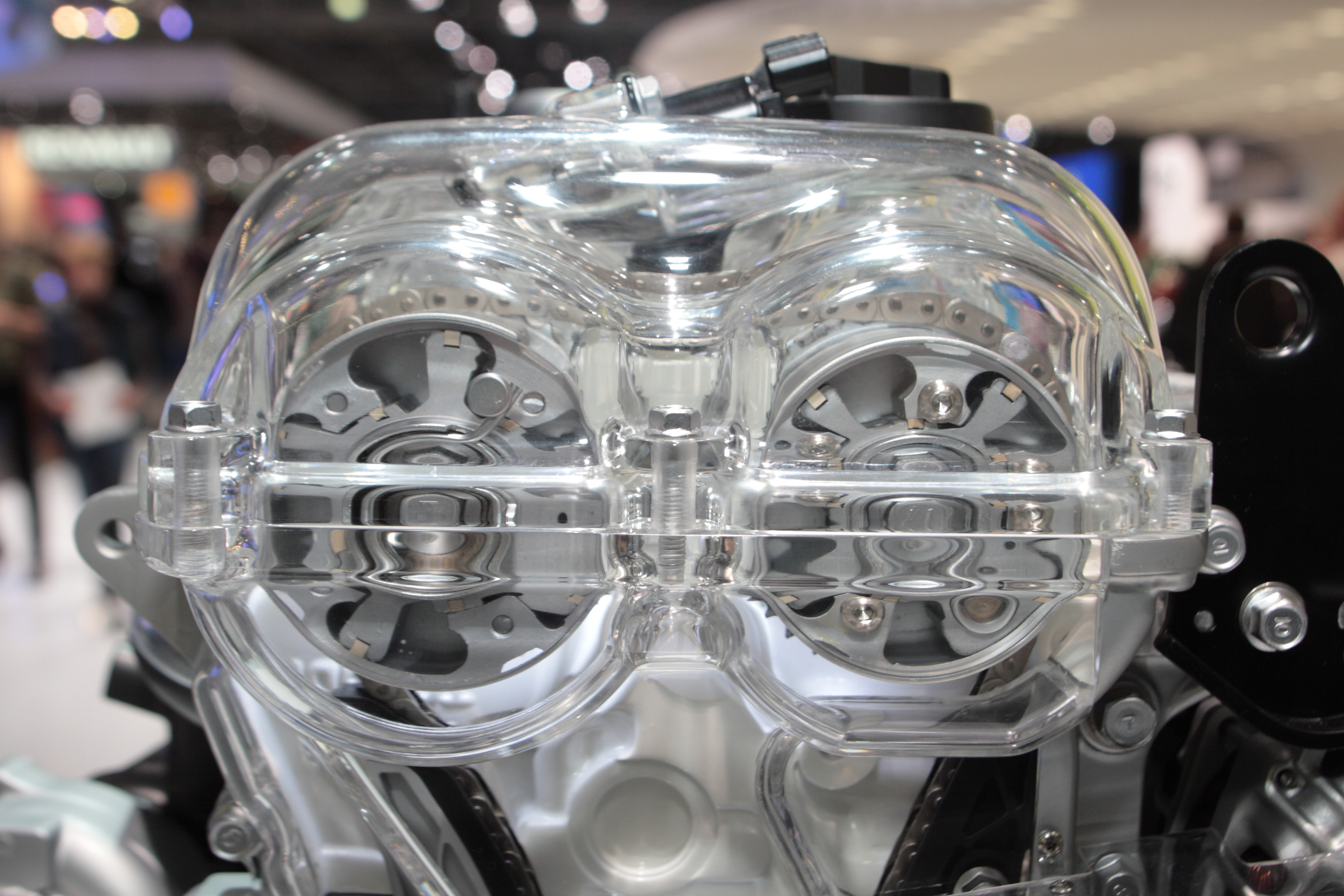
Hydraulic vane-type phasers on a cut-out model of Hyundai T-GDI engine

Manufacturers use many different names to describe their implementation of the various types of variable valve timing systems. These names include:

- AVCS (Subaru)
- AVLS (Subaru)
- CPS (Proton)
- CVVTCS (Nissan, Infiniti)
- CVVT (developed by Hyundai and Kia, but it can also be found on Geely, Iran Khodro and Volvo)
- DCVCP - dual continuous variable cam phasing (General Motors)
- DVT (Desmodromic variable timing, Ducati)
- DVVT (Daihatsu, Perodua, Wuling)
- FSI, TFSI, TSI, SI (Volkswagen Group)
- MIVEC (Mitsubishi)
- MultiAir (FCA)
- VCT (Ford)
- N-VCT (Nissan)
- S-VT (Mazda)
- Shiftcam (BMW Motorrad)
- Ti-VCT (Ford)
- VANOS (Variable Nockenwellen Steuerung) - 'camshaft timing' without and with added Valvetronic (BMW)
- Variatore di fase Alfa Romeo (VCT) (Alfa Romeo)
- VarioCam (Porsche)
- VTEC, i-VTEC (Honda, Acura)
- VTi, (Citroën, Peugeot, Opel and Mini (marque))
- VVC (MG Rover)
- VVL (Nissan)
- Valvelift (Audi)
- VVA (Yamaha)
- VVEL (Nissan, Infiniti)
- VVT (Chrysler, General Motors, Proton, Suzuki and Maruti Suzuki, Isuzu, Volkswagen Group, Toyota)
- VVT-i, VVTL-i (Toyota, Daihatsu, Lexus)
- VTVT (Hyundai)

== Methods for implementing variable valve control (VVC) ==
=== Cam switching ===
This method uses two cam profiles, with an actuator to swap between the profiles (usually at a specific engine speed). Cam switching can also provide variable valve lift and variable duration, however the adjustment is discrete rather than continuous.

The first production use of this system was Honda's VTEC system. VTEC changes hydraulic pressure to actuate a pin that locks the high lift, high duration rocker arm to an adjacent low lift, low duration rocker arm(s).

=== Cam phasing ===
Many production VVT systems are the cam phasing type, using a device known as a variator which changes the phase (Phase refers to the relative timing between the inlet and exhaust camshafts, expressed as an angular measure.) of the camshaft and valves. This allows continuous adjustment of the cam timing (although many early systems only used discrete adjustment), however the duration and lift cannot be adjusted.

=== Oscillating cam ===
These designs use an oscillating or rocking motion in a part cam lobe, which acts on a follower. This follower then opens and closes the valve. Some oscillating cam systems use a conventional cam lobe, while others use an eccentric cam lobe and a connecting rod. The principle is similar to steam engines, where the amount of steam entering the cylinder was regulated by the steam "cut-off" point.

The advantage of this design is that adjustment of lift and duration is continuous. However, in these systems, lift is proportional to duration, so lift and duration cannot be separately adjusted.

The BMW (valvetronic), Nissan (VVEL), and Toyota (valvematic) oscillating cam systems act on the intake valves only.

=== Eccentric cam drive ===
Eccentric cam drive systems operates through an eccentric disc mechanism which slows and speeds up the angular speed of the cam lobe during its rotation. Arranging the lobe to slow during its open period is equivalent to lengthening its duration.

The advantage of this system is that duration can be varied independent of lift (however this system does not vary lift). The drawback is two eccentric drives and controllers are needed for each cylinder (one for the intake valves and one for the exhaust valves), which increases complexity and cost.

MG Rover is the only manufacturer that has released engines using this system.

=== Three-dimensional cam lobe ===
This system consists of a cam lobe that varies along its length (similar to a cone shape). One end of the cam lobe has a short duration/reduced lift profile, and the other end has a longer duration/greater lift profile. In between, the lobe provides a smooth transition between these two profiles. By shifting area of the cam lobe which is in contact with the follower, the lift and duration can be continuously altered. This is achieved by moving the camshaft axially (sliding it across the engine) so a stationary follower is exposed to a varying lobe profile to produce different amounts of lift and duration. The downside to this arrangement is that the cam and follower profiles must be carefully designed to minimise contact stress (due to the varying profile).

Ferrari is commonly associated with this system, however it is unknown whether any production models to date have used this system.

=== Two shaft combined cam lobe profile ===
This system is not known to be used in any production engines.

It consists of two (closely spaced) parallel camshafts, with a pivoting follower that spans both camshafts and is acted on by two lobes simultaneously. Each camshaft has a phasing mechanism which allows its angular position relative to the engine's crankshaft to be adjusted. One lobe controls the opening of a valve and the other controls the closing of the same valve, therefore variable duration is achieved through the spacing of these two events.

The drawbacks to this design include:

- At long duration settings, one lobe may be starting to reduce its lift as the other is still increasing. This has the effect of lessening the overall lift and possibly causing dynamic problems. One company claims to have solved the uneven rate of opening of the valve problem to some extent thus allowing long duration at full lift.
- Size of the system, due to the parallel shafts, the larger followers etc.

=== Coaxial two shaft combined cam lobe profile ===
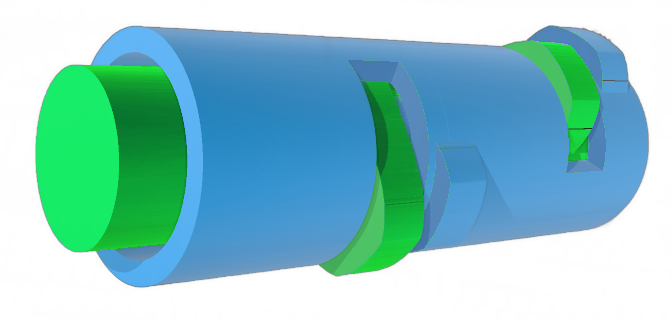
A cam-in-cam system for variable valve timing. The inner and outer camshafts rotate by a few degrees relative to each other while in operation.

The operating principle is that the one follower spans the pair of closely spaced lobes. Up to the angular limit of the nose radius, the follower is acted upon by the combined surface of the two lobes as a continuous, smooth surface. When the lobes are exactly aligned the duration is at a minimum (and equal to that of each lobe alone) and when at the extreme extent of their misalignment the duration is at a maximum. The basic limitation of the scheme is that only a duration variation equal to that of the lobe nose true radius (in camshaft degrees or double this value in crankshaft degrees) is possible. In practice this type of variable cam has a maximum range of duration variation of about forty crankshaft degrees.

This is the principle behind what seems to be the very first variable cam suggestion appearing in the USPTO patent files in 1925 (1527456). The "Clemson camshaft" is of this type.

The system described above is not known to be used in any production engines, but a simplified version was developed by Mechadyne for the Viper V10 engine for the 2008 model year. This pushrod engine had two valves per cylinder and a single camshaft. The timing of the exhaust valves was adjusted by up to 36° relative to the inlet valves by a cam-in-cam system (the duration of exhaust valve opening was not altered).

=== Helical camshaft ===
Also known as "combined two shaft coaxial combined profile with helical movement", this system is not known to be used in any production engines.

It has a similar principle to the previous type, and can use the same base duration lobe profile. However instead of rotation in a single plane, the adjustment is both axial and rotational giving a helical or three-dimensional aspect to its movement. This movement overcomes the restricted duration range in the previous type. The duration range is theoretically unlimited but typically would be of the order of one hundred crankshaft degrees, which is sufficient to cover most situations.

The cam is reportedly difficult and expensive to produce, requiring very accurate helical machining and careful assembly.

=== Camless engines ===
Engine designs which do not rely on a camshaft to operate the valves have greater flexibility in achieving variable valve timing and variable valve lift. The only production car that uses the camless design so far is the Koenigsegg Gemera.

=== Hydraulic system ===
This system utilizes the engine lube oil to control the closure of inlet valve. The intake valve opening mechanism incorporates a valve tappet and a piston inside a chamber. There is a solenoid valve controlled by the engine control system which gets energized and supplies oil through a non-return valve during the time of cam lift and the oil gets filled in the chamber and the return channel to the sump is blocked by the valve tappet. During the downward movement of the cam, at a particular instant, the return passage opens and the oil pressure gets released to the engine sump.
