= Nissan VVL engine =

Nissan SR16VE
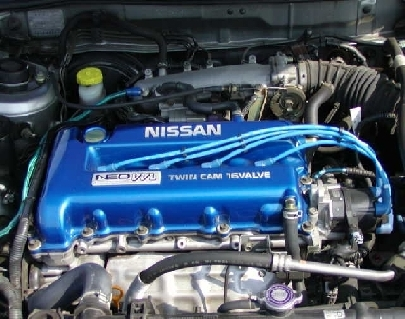

Overview
- Production: 1997–2001

Layout
- Displacement: 1.6L

Output
- Power output: 175 hp (130 kW)
- Torque output: 119 lb⋅ft (161 N⋅m)

Nissan SR20VE
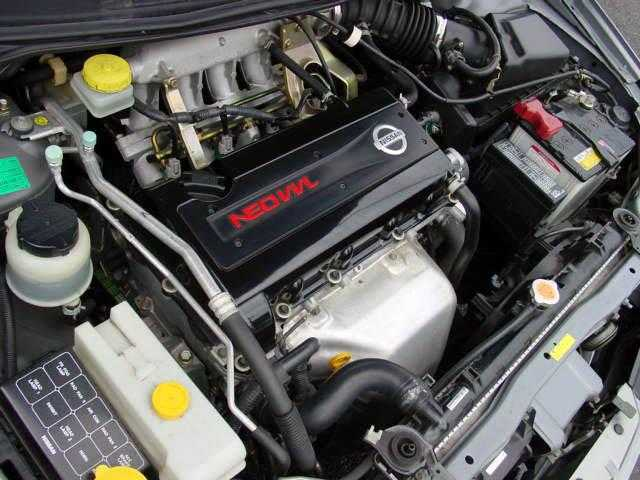

Overview
- Production: 2001–2003

Layout
- Displacement: 2.0L

Output
- Power output: 204 hp (152 kW)
- Torque output: 152 lb⋅ft (206 N⋅m)

Nissan SR20VET

Overview
- Production: 2001–2007

Layout
- Displacement: 2.0L

Output
- Power output: 276 hp (206 kW)
- Torque output: 228 lb⋅ft (309 N⋅m)

Nissan Ecology Oriented Variable Valve Lift and Timing (commonly known as VVL & VVT) is an automobile variable valve timing technology developed by Nissan. VVL varies the duration, and lift of valves by using hydraulic pressure switch between two different sets of camshaft lobes. VVT varies the valve timing throughout the RPM range. Together they function similarly to Honda's VTEC system.

The SR20VE is the most common engine with NEO VVL. There have been two main versions of this engine. The first version made 187 hp (139 kW) and 145 lb⋅ft (197 N⋅m) torque. This engine was used by Nissan from 1997 to 2001. It is found in the Nissan Primera, Nissan Bluebird, and the Nissan Wingroad.

The second variant of the SR20VE is found only in the 2001 and later P12 Nissan Primera. This version of the SR20VE makes 204 hp (152 kW), and 152 lb⋅ft (206 N⋅m) torque. This engine is commonly known as the SR20VE '20V'. Although, in automotive terms, '20V' would normally be interpreted as having twenty valves, this is incorrect. The name '20V' is the name of the trim level of the Nissan Primera that it is found in. It is also a shortened version of the name SR20VE. This engine has 16 valves like the rest of the SR20 engines. This newer '20V' engine, along with the SR20VET, were the only SR20 engines to get restyled valve covers. It also came with an upgraded intake manifold, which has longer runners and a larger 70 mm (2.8 in) throttle body (earlier SR20VE has 60 mm).

Another version of the VVL SR engines, is the 1.6 L SR16VE. The engine block for the SR16VE is the same as the SR20VE; it also has the same cylinder bore. The crankshaft has a shorter stroke, which lowers the displacement, but allows the engine to safely rev to higher RPM. Although this engine has 1.6 L of displacement, it has more aggressive camshaft specifications. It manages to make 173 hp (129 kW). The camshafts from this engine are considered to be an upgrade for SR20VE owners.

From 1997 to 1998, Nissan produced 500 limited-edition SR16VE N1 engines. These engines made 197 hp (147 kW). They had further upgraded camshafts, upgraded intake manifold using eight injectors and a larger 70 mm (2.8 in) throttle body. These engines were found in the limited-edition Nissan Pulsar VZ-R N1. They were only sold in Japan.

The most powerful VVL engine so far is the SR20VET. The SR20VET is a turbocharged '20V' SR20VE. It uses a Garrett GT2560LS, and makes 280 PS (206 kW; 276 hp). Nissan's technical information about this engine states that it is 9:1 compression ratio, but it really adds up to 8.8:1. Compared to the SR20DET (used in the Nissan Silvia, and Bluebird), the SR20VET (aside from having VVL technology) has improved airflow in the cylinder head, higher compression, and also improved coolant passages.

In 1998 Nissan's RB engine was also improved using the NEO Head Technology (but no VVL), which provided the motor better fuel economy and lower exhaust emissions to keep up with emission standards.

One difference from Honda's VTEC system is that NEO VVL engages the change of intake and exhaust cams independently for a flatter, more consistent power band. On the SR20VE, the intake camshaft is switched at 5000 rpm, and the exhaust at 6500 rpm. However this trait was not included on the newer '20V' version, as both camshafts engage at the same RPM.

== See also ==
- Nissan Continuous Variable Valve Timing Control
- Nissan SR engine
- Nissan Variable Cam Timing
- Nissan Variable Valve Event and Lift

== Sources ==
- New Zealand Primera Club
- Nissan Primera Owners Club - Valuable Primera Information
- SR20forum VVL FAQ FAQ about VVL
- Nissan Japan Official Nissan of Japan site
- NeoVVL Owners Club The Resource for the NeoVVL Engine
